= 2009 in Russian football =

Football in Russia
- Season: 2009 The Russian Premier League schedule of competitions and cups from 2009.

Men's football
- Russian Premier League: Rubin Kazan
- Russian First Division: Anzhi Makhachkala
- Russian Second Division: Zhemchuzhina-Sochi
- Russian Cup: CSKA Moscow
- Russian Super Cup: CSKA Moscow

Women's football
- Russian Championship: Zvezda-2005 Perm

== Club competitions ==
FC Rubin Kazan won the league for the second time in a row.

For more details, see:

- 2009 Russian Premier League
- 2009 Russian First Division
- 2009 Russian Second Division

== Cup competitions ==
=== 2008–09 Russian Cup ===
31 May 2009
14:00

Rubin Kazan	0 – 1	CSKA Moscow
		Aldonin 90+2'

Arena Khimki, Khimki
Attendance: 13,000
Referee: Stanislav Sukhina (Malakhovka)

=== 2009 Russian Super Cup ===
7 March 2009
14:00 MSK

Rubin Kazan	1 – 2 (a.e.t.)	CSKA Moscow
Sharonov 62'	(Report)	Šemberas 43'; Necid 113'

Luzhniki, Moscow
Attendance: 15,000
Referee: Stanislav Sukhina (Malakhovka)

== European club competitions ==
=== 2008–09 UEFA Champions League ===
FC Zenit Saint Petersburg took third place in the group stage and enters the UEFA Cup at the round of 32.

=== 2008–09 UEFA Cup ===
FC Zenit Saint Petersburg and CSKA Moscow was knocked out in the Round of 16.

- February 18, 2009 / Round of 32, First Leg / FC Zenit Saint Petersburg - Stuttgart 2-1 (Huszti 2' Tymoshchuk 45+3' - Gómez 15') / Saint Petersburg, Petrovsky Stadium / Attendance: 17,585

FC Zenit Saint Petersburg: Malafeev, Anyukov, Shirokov, Križanac, Šírl, Tymoshchuk (captain), Zyryanov (Tekke, 75), Semshov, Huszti (Fayzulin, 88), Danny, Pogrebnyak.

- February 18, 2009 / Round of 32, First Leg / Aston Villa - PFC CSKA Moscow 1-1 (Carew 69' - Vágner Love 14') / Birmingham, Villa Park / Attendance: 38,038

PFC CSKA Moscow: Akinfeev (captain), V. Berezutski, Ignashevich, A. Berezutskiy, Schennikov, Krasić, Rahimić, Aldonin (Mamaev, 90), Zhirkov (Caner, 90+2), Dzagoev (Carvalho, 80), Vágner Love.

- February 26, 2009 / Round of 32, Second Leg / PFC CSKA Moscow - Aston Villa 2-0 (Zhirkov 61' Vágner Love 90+3') / Moscow, Luzhniki Stadium / Attendance: 25,650

PFC CSKA Moscow: Akinfeev (captain), V. Berezutski, Ignashevich, A. Berezutskiy, Schennikov, Krasić, Rahimić, Šemberas, Zhirkov, Dzagoev, Vágner Love.

- February 26, 2009 / Round of 32, Second Leg / Stuttgart - FC Zenit Saint Petersburg 1-2 (Gebhart 80' - Semshov 42' Fayzulin 86')/ Stuttgart, Mercedes-Benz Arena / Attendance: 34,500

FC Zenit Saint Petersburg: Malafeev, Kim, Križanac, Shirokov, Anyukov, Zyryanov, Denisov, Semshov, Danny, Pogrebnyak, Huszti (Fayzulin, 73).

- March 12, 2009 / Round of 16, First Leg / PFC CSKA Moscow - Shakhtar Donetsk 1-0 (Vágner Love 50' (pen.)) / Moscow, Luzhniki Stadium / Attendance: 19,700

PFC CSKA Moscow: Akinfeev (captain), V. Berezutski, Ignashevich, A. Berezutskiy, Schennikov, Krasić (Kalouda, 89), Rahimić (Mamaev, 45), Šemberas, Zhirkov (Caner, 70), Dzagoev, Vágner Love.

- March 12, 2009 / Round of 16, First Leg / Udinese - FC Zenit Saint Petersburg 2-0 (Quagliarella 85'Di Natale 88' (pen.)) / Udine, Stadio Friuli / Attendance: 20,000

FC Zenit Saint Petersburg: Malafeev, Šírl, Križanac, Shirokov, Anyukov, Zyryanov (Fayzulin, 85), Denisov, Tymoshchuk (captain), Danny, Pogrebnyak (Tekke, 62), Huszti (Semshov, 62).

- March 19, 2009 / Round of 16, Second Leg / FC Zenit Saint Petersburg - Udinese 1-0 (Tymoshchuk 34')/ Saint Petersburg, Petrovsky Stadium / Attendance: 19,500

FC Zenit Saint Petersburg: Malafeev, Šírl (Huszti, 71), Križanac, Fayzulin (Tekke, 71), Kim, Zyryanov, Denisov, Tymoshchuk (captain), Danny, Pogrebnyak, Semshov.

- March 19, 2009 / Round of 16, Second Leg / Shakhtar Donetsk - PFC CSKA Moscow 2-0 (Fernandinho 54' (pen.) Luiz Adriano 70') / Donetsk, RSC Olimpiyskiy / Attendance: 25,000

PFC CSKA Moscow: Akinfeev (captain), V. Berezutski, Ignashevich, A. Berezutskiy, Schennikov, Krasić, Mamaev (Ryzhov, 76), Šemberas, Caner (Carvalho, 66), Dzagoev (Aldonin, 65), Vágner Love.

=== 2009–10 UEFA Champions League ===
FC Dynamo Moscow lose in the Third qualifying round and enter into the play-off round of the 2009–10 UEFA Europa League.

- July 29, 2009 / Third qualifying round, First Leg /Celtic - FC Dynamo Moscow 0-1 (Kokorin 7') / Glasgow, Celtic Park / Attendance: 54,184

FC Dynamo Moscow: Gabulov, Kowalczyk, Fernández, K. Kombarov, D. Kombarov, Kerzhakov, Granat, Wilkshire, Kolodin, Svezhov, Kokorin (Smolov, 74).

- August 5, 2009 / Third qualifying round, Second Leg / FC Dynamo Moscow - Celtic 0-2 (McDonald 45' Samaras 90+1') / Khimki, Arena Khimki / Attendance: 13,753

FC Dynamo Moscow: Gabulov, Kowalczyk, Fernández (Ropotan, 90+6), K. Kombarov, Khokhlov, D. Kombarov, Kerzhakov, Granat, Wilkshire, Kolodin, Svezhov (Kokorin, 84).

FC Rubin Kazan and PFC CSKA Moscow qualified directly into group stage. FC Rubin Kazan finished third in Group F and enters in UEFA Europa League knockout stage. PFC CSKA Moscow finished second in Group B and enters in First knockout round.

- September 15, 2009 / Matchday 1 / Wolfsburg - PFC CSKA Moscow 3-1 (Grafite 36', 41' (pen.), 87' - Dzagoev 76') / Wolfsburg, Volkswagen Arena / Attendance: 25,017

PFC CSKA Moscow: Akinfeev (captain), Šemberas, Ignashevich, A. Berezutskiy, Dzagoev, Krasić, Guilherme, Aldonin (Mamaev, 68), V. Berezutski (Necid, 84), Rahimić, Schennikov (Piliyev, 57).

- September 16, 2009 / Matchday 1 / Dynamo Kyiv - FC Rubin Kazan 3-1 (Yussuf 71' Magrão 79' Husyev 85' - Domínguez 25') / Kyiv, Lobanovsky Dynamo Stadium / Attendance: 15,000

FC Rubin Kazan: Ryzhikov, Ansaldi, César Navas, Semak (captain), Domínguez (Murawski, 77), Bukharov, Ryazantsev (Kasaev, 83), Noboa, Kaleshin, Gökdeniz, Sharonov.

- September 29, 2009 / Matchday 2 / FC Rubin Kazan - Internazionale 1-1 (Domínguez 11' - Stanković 27') / Kazan, Central Stadium / Attendance: 23,670

FC Rubin Kazan: Ryzhikov, Ansaldi, César Navas, Semak (captain), Salukvadze, Domínguez (Kasaev, 86), Bukharov, Ryazantsev, Noboa, Gökdeniz, Sharonov.

- September 30, 2009 / Matchday 2 / PFC CSKA Moscow - Beşiktaş 2-1 (Dzagoev 7' Krasić 61' - Dağ 90+2') / Moscow, Luzhniki Stadium / Attendance: 19,750

PFC CSKA Moscow: Akinfeev (captain), Šemberas, Ignashevich, A. Berezutskiy (Grigoryev, 46), Dzagoev, Mamaev, González (Schennikov, 78), Odiah, Krasić, V. Berezutski, Necid (Rahimić, 64).

- October 20, 2009 / Matchday 3 / Barcelona - FC Rubin Kazan 1-2 (Ibrahimović 48' - Ryazantsev 2' Gökdeniz 73') / Barcelona, Camp Nou / Attendance: 55,930

FC Rubin Kazan: Ryzhikov, Ansaldi, César Navas, Semak (captain) (Murawski, 43), Salukvadze, Domínguez, Ryazantsev (Kasaev, 83), Noboa, Kaleshin, Gökdeniz (Popov, 90+3), Sharonov.

- October 21, 2009 / Matchday 3 / PFC CSKA Moscow - Manchester United 0-1 (Valencia 86') / Moscow, Luzhniki Stadium / Attendance: 51,250

PFC CSKA Moscow: Akinfeev (captain), Šemberas, Ignashevich, A. Berezutskiy, Dzagoev, Odiah, Krasić, V. Berezutski, Rahimić (Carvalho, 90), Schennikov (Mamaev, 62), Necid (Piliyev, 73).

- November 3, 2009 / Matchday 4 / Manchester United - PFC CSKA Moscow 3-3 (Owen 29' Scholes 84' Valencia 90+2' - Dzagoev 25' Krasić 31' V. Berezutski 47' ) / Manchester, Old Trafford / Attendance: 73,718

PFC CSKA Moscow: Akinfeev (captain), Šemberas, Ignashevich, A. Berezutskiy, Dzagoev (Carvalho, 72), Mamaev (Rahimić, 70), Krasić, Aldonin, V. Berezutski, Schennikov, Necid (Piliyev, 85).

- November 4, 2009 / Matchday 4 / FC Rubin Kazan - Barcelona 0-0 / Kazan, Central Stadium / Attendance: 24,600

FC Rubin Kazan: Ryzhikov, Ansaldi, César Navas, Semak (captain), Salukvadze, Domínguez, Ryazantsev, Noboa, Kaleshin, Gökdeniz (Bukharov, 62), Sharonov.

- November 24, 2009 / Matchday 5 / FC Rubin Kazan - Dynamo Kyiv 0-0 / Kazan, Central Stadium / Attendance: 23,185

FC Rubin Kazan: Ryzhikov, Ansaldi, César Navas, Semak (captain), Salukvadze, Domínguez, Bukharov, Ryazantsev, Noboa, Gökdeniz (Bystrov, 75), Sharonov (Kaleshin, 53).

- November 25, 2009 / Matchday 5 / PFC CSKA Moscow - Wolfsburg 2-1 (Necid 58' Krasić 66' - Džeko 19') / Moscow, Luzhniki Stadium / Attendance: 13,478

PFC CSKA Moscow: Akinfeev (captain), Ignashevich, A. Berezutskiy, Dzagoev, Mamaev, Krasić, Aldonin, V. Berezutski, Rahimić, Schennikov, Necid.

- December 8, 2009 / Matchday 6 / Beşiktaş - PFC CSKA Moscow 1-2 (Bobô 86' - Krasić 41' Aldonin 90+5' ) / Istanbul, BJK İnönü Stadium / Attendance: 16,129

PFC CSKA Moscow: Akinfeev (captain), Šemberas, Dzagoev (Grigoryev, 90+6), Mamaev, Odiah, Krasić (Oliseh, 82), Aldonin, V. Berezutski, Rahimić, Schennikov, Necid.

- December 9, 2009 / Matchday 6 / Internazionale - FC Rubin Kazan 2-0 (Eto'o 31' Balotelli 64') / Milan, San Siro / Attendance: 49,539

FC Rubin Kazan: Ryzhikov, César Navas, Semak (captain), Salukvadze, Domínguez, Ryazantsev (Balyaikin, 84), Noboa (Bystrov, 81), Kaleshin, Popov, Murawski, Gökdeniz (Kasaev, 74).

=== 2009–10 UEFA Europa League ===
FC Krylia Sovetov Samara lose in the Third qualifying round.

- July 30, 2009 / Third qualifying round, First Leg / St Patrick's Athletic - FC Krylia Sovetov Samara 1-0 (O'Brien 71') / Dublin, Richmond Park / Attendance: 3,500

FC Krylia Sovetov Samara: Lobos, Kalachev, Leilton, Shishkin, Bober, Savin, Jarošík, Adzhindzhal, Ignatyev, Belozyorov, Ivanov (Kulik, 78).

- August 6, 2009 / Third qualifying round, Second Leg / FC Krylia Sovetov Samara - St Patrick's Athletic 3-2 (Bober 41' Savin 53', 57' - Bober 73' (o.g.) O'Brien 79') / Samara, Metallurg Stadium / Attendance: 17,000

FC Krylia Sovetov Samara: Lobos, Kalachev, Shishkin, Bober, Taranov, Savin, Adzhindzhal, Ignatyev (Kulik, 39), Budylin (Leilton, 68), Belozyorov, Ivanov.

FC Amkar Perm, FC Zenit Saint Petersburg and FC Dynamo Moscow lose in the Play-off round.

- August 20, 2009 / Play-off round, First Leg / CSKA Sofia - FC Dynamo Moscow 0-0 / Sofia, Vasil Levski National Stadium / Attendance: 23,250

FC Dynamo Moscow: Gabulov, Kowalczyk, Fernández, K. Kombarov, Khokhlov (Ropotan, 85), D. Kombarov, Kerzhakov, Granat, Wilkshire, Kolodin, Kokorin (Aguiar, 68).

- August 20, 2009 / Play-off round, First Leg / Fulham - FC Amkar Perm 3-1 ( Johnson 4' Dempsey 51' Zamora 75' - Grishin 77') / London, Craven Cottage / Attendance: 13,029

FC Amkar Perm: Narubin, Peev, Novaković (Telkiyski, 68), Sirakov, Gaál, Jean Carlos (Junuzović, 85), Drinčić, Zhilyayev (Grishin, 60), Belorukov, Cherenchikov, Kushev.

- August 20, 2009 / Play-off round, First Leg / Nacional - FC Zenit Saint Petersburg 4-3 (Luís Alberto 30' João Aurélio 37' Silva 53' Micael 73' - Semshov 44', 55' Tekke 90+2') / Funchal, Estádio da Madeira / Attendance: 2,500

FC Zenit Saint Petersburg: Malafeev, Anyukov, Meira, Lombaerts, Hubočan, Shirokov, Zyryanov, Kornilenko (Tekke, 68), Semshov, Huszti (Rosina, 58), Denisov (Ignatovich, 76).

- August 27, 2009 / Play-off round, Second Leg / FC Amkar Perm - Fulham 1-0 ( Kushev 90') / Perm, Zvezda Stadium / Attendance: 20,000

FC Amkar Perm: Narubin, Grishin (Junuzović, 76), Telkiyski (Novaković, 60), Peev, Sirakov, Gaál, Jean Carlos (Zhilyayev, 64), Drinčić, Belorukov, Cherenchikov, Kushev.

- August 27, 2009 / Play-off round, Second Leg / FC Dynamo Moscow - CSKA Sofia 1-2 (Kerzhakov 10' - Delev 14' Ivanov 56' / Khimki, Arena Khimki / Attendance: 8,486

FC Dynamo Moscow: Gabulov, Kowalczyk (Smolov, 61), Fernández, K. Kombarov, Khokhlov, D. Kombarov, Kerzhakov, Granat (Kokorin, 56), Aguiar (Dimidko, 46), Wilkshire, Kolodin.

- August 27, 2009 / Play-off round, Second Leg / FC Zenit Saint Petersburg - Nacional 1-1 (Tekke 34') - Micael 89') / Saint Petersburg, Petrovsky Stadium / Attendance: 20,000

FC Zenit Saint Petersburg: Čontofalský, Anyukov, Meira, Kim, Lombaerts, Tekke (Rosina, 61), Shirokov (Križanac, 71), Zyryanov, Kornilenko, Semshov, Huszti (Ignatovich, 90+1).
