= 2009 PFC CSKA Moscow season =

PFC CSKA Moscow
2009 season
- Manager: Zico till 10 September 2009; Juande Ramos; 10 September - 26 October 2009; Leonid Slutskiy from 26 October 2009
- Premier League: 5th
- 2008–09 Russian Cup: Champions
- 2009–10 Russian Cup: Round of 32 vs Ural Sverdlovsk Oblast
- 2008–09 UEFA Cup: Round of 16 vs Shakhtar Donetsk
- 2009–10 UEFA Champions League: Progressed to 2010 season
- Top goalscorer: League: Tomáš Necid (9); Miloš Krasić (9); All: Miloš Krasić (13)
| Home colours | Away colours | Third colours |

Brazilian legend Zico was appointed as the club's manager at the start of the season following the departure of Valery Gazzaev. Zico left the club in September, being replaced by Juande Ramos, who only lasted 47 days before being replaced by Leonid Slutsky.

== Squad ==
As of match played 8 December 2009

| Number | Name | Nationality | Position | Date of birth (age) | Signed from | Signed in | Contract ends | Apps. | Goals |
Goalkeepers
| 33 | Yevgeny Pomazan | (Russia) | GK | 31 January 1989 (aged 20) | Kuban Krasnodar | 2008 | | 3 | 0 |
| 35 | Igor Akinfeev | (Russia) | GK | 8 April 1986 (aged 23) | Academy | 2003 | | 253 | 0 |
| 40 | Stanislav Plokhikh | (Russia) | GK | 10 February 1992 (aged 17) | Academy | 2009 | | 0 | 0 |
| 60 | Ivan Skripnik | (Russia) | GK | 10 August 1992 (aged 17) | Academy | 2009 | | 0 | 0 |
| 77 | Artur Nigmatullin | (Russia) | GK | 17 May 1991 (aged 18) | Luch-Energiya Vladivostok | 2008 | | 0 | 0 |
Defenders
| 2 | Deividas Šemberas | (Lithuania) | DF | 2 August 1978 (aged 31) | Dynamo Moscow | 2002 | | 291 | 1 |
| 4 | Sergei Ignashevich | (Russia) | DF | 14 July 1979 (aged 30) | Lokomotiv Moscow | 2004 | | 233 | 22 |
| 6 | Aleksei Berezutski | (Russia) | DF | 20 June 1982 (aged 27) | Chernomorets Novorossiysk | 2001 | | 285 | 7 |
| 15 | Chidi Odiah | (Nigeria) | DF | 17 December 1983 (aged 25) | Sheriff Tiraspol | 2004 | | 105 | 4 |
| 24 | Vasili Berezutski | (Russia) | DF | 20 June 1982 (aged 27) | Torpedo-ZIL | 2002 | | 246 | 9 |
| 34 | Vitālijs Maksimenko | (Latvia) | DF | 8 December 1990 (aged 19) | loan from Daugava Rīga | 2009 | | 0 | 0 |
| 37 | Maksim Potapov | (Russia) | DF | 21 May 1991 (aged 18) | Spartak Moscow | 2009 | | 0 | 0 |
| 42 | Georgi Shchennikov | (Russia) | DF | 27 April 1991 (aged 18) | Academy | 2008 | | 43 | 0 |
| 50 | Anton Grigoryev | (Russia) | DF | 13 December 1985 (aged 23) | Academy | 2004 | | 57 | 0 |
| 52 | Aleksei Nikitin | (Russia) | DF | 27 January 1992 (aged 17) | Academy | 2009 | | 0 | 0 |
| 54 | Uroš Ćosić | (Serbia) | DF | 24 October 1992 (aged 17) | Red Star Belgrade | 2009 | | 0 | 0 |
| 55 | Iskandar Dzhalilov | (Russia) | DF | 1 June 1992 (aged 17) | Academy | 2008 | | 0 | 0 |
| 59 | Semyon Fedotov | (Russia) | DF | 2 March 1992 (aged 17) | Academy | 2009 | | 0 | 0 |
Midfielders
| 7 | Daniel Carvalho | (Brazil) | MF | 1 March 1983 (aged 26) | Internacional | 2003 | 2009 | 140 | 26 |
| 10 | Alan Dzagoev | (Russia) | MF | 17 June 1990 (aged 19) | Krylia Sovetov-SOK Dimitrovgrad | 2008 | | 69 | 23 |
| 11 | Pavel Mamayev | (Russia) | MF | 17 September 1988 (aged 21) | Torpedo Moscow | 2007 | | 69 | 4 |
| 13 | Mark González | (Chile) | MF | 10 July 1984 (aged 25) | Real Betis | 2009 | 2014 | 6 | 2 |
| 17 | Miloš Krasić | (Serbia) | MF | 1 November 1984 (aged 25) | Vojvodina | 2004 | | 211 | 31 |
| 22 | Evgeni Aldonin | (Russia) | MF | 22 January 1980 (aged 29) | Rotor Volgograd | 2004 | | 247 | 13 |
| 23 | Nika Piliyev | (Russia) | MF | 21 March 1991 (aged 18) | Lokomotiv Moscow | 2009 | | 7 | 0 |
| 25 | Elvir Rahimić | (Bosnia and Herzegovina) | MF | 4 April 1976 (aged 33) | Anzhi Makhachkala | 2001 | | 314 | 4 |
| 26 | Sekou Oliseh | (Liberia) | MF | 5 June 1990 (aged 19) | loan from Midtjylland | 2009 | | 6 | 1 |
| 41 | Dmitriy Zameshayev | (Russia) | MF | 14 May 1991 (aged 18) | Academy | 2009 | | 0 | 0 |
| 46 | Aleksandr Stolyarenko | (Russia) | MF | 18 January 1991 (aged 18) | Togliatti | 2009 | | 0 | 0 |
| 47 | Yevgeni Sherenkov | (Russia) | MF | 27 January 1991 (aged 18) | Academy | 2008 | | 0 | 0 |
| 48 | Igor Dragunov | (Russia) | MF | 6 April 1991 (aged 18) | Academy | 2008 | | 0 | 0 |
| 49 | Aleksandr Vasilyev | (Russia) | MF | 23 January 1991 (aged 18) | Academy | 2009 | | 0 | 0 |
| 51 | Aleksei Kiselyov | (Russia) | MF | 1 May 1992 (aged 17) | Academy | 2009 | | 0 | 0 |
| 53 | Maksim Fyodorov | (Russia) | MF | 5 April 1989 (aged 20) | Togliatti | 2009 | | 0 | 0 |
| 57 | Nikita Andreyev | (Russia) | MF | 18 February 1990 (aged 19) | Academy | 2009 | | 0 | 0 |
| 62 | Yevgeni Kobzar | (Russia) | MF | 9 August 1992 (aged 17) | Academy | 2009 | | 0 | 0 |
Forwards
| 12 | Moussa Maâzou | (Niger) | FW | 25 August 1988 (aged 21) | Lokeren | 2009 | | 19 | 3 |
| 14 | Ricardo Jesus | (Brazil) | FW | 16 May 1985 (aged 24) | Spartak Nalchik | 2008 | | 19 | 2 |
| 20 | Guilherme | (Brazil) | FW | 22 October 1988 (aged 21) | loan from Dynamo Kyiv | 2009 | | 6 | 3 |
| 45 | Aleksandr Kudryavtsev | (Russia) | FW | 9 June 1990 (aged 19) | Academy | 2008 | | 0 | 0 |
| 56 | Ganiyu Oseni | (Nigeria) | FW | 19 September 1991 (aged 18) | Prime | 2008 | | 0 | 0 |
| 61 | Artak Grigoryan | (Russia) | FW | 26 February 1991 (aged 18) | Academy | 2009 | | 0 | 0 |
| 89 | Tomáš Necid | (Czech Republic) | FW | 13 August 1989 (aged 20) | Slavia Prague | 2009 | | 37 | 12 |
| 91 | Anton Zabolotny | (Russia) | FW | 13 June 1991 (aged 18) | Metallurg Lipetsk | 2004 | | 0 | 0 |
Away on loan
| 1 | Veniamin Mandrykin | (Russia) | GK | 30 August 1981 (aged 28) | Alania Vladikavkaz | 2002 | | 95 | 0 |
| 5 | Ramón | (Brazil) | MF | 24 May 1988 (aged 21) | Corinthians | 2007 | | 35 | 2 |
| 8 | Dmitri Ryzhov | (Russia) | FW | 26 August 1989 (aged 20) | Krylia Sovetov-SOK Dimitrovgrad | 2008 | | 15 | 0 |
| 9 | Vágner Love | (Brazil) | FW | 11 June 1984 (aged 25) | Palmeiras | 2004 | | 184 | 95 |
| 19 | Dawid Janczyk | (Poland) | FW | 23 September 1987 (aged 22) | Legia Warsaw | 2007 | | 22 | 3 |
| 21 | Luboš Kalouda | (Czech Republic) | MF | 20 May 1987 (aged 22) | 1.FC Brno | 2008 | | 8 | 0 |
| 36 | Anton Vlasov | (Russia) | DF | 11 May 1989 (aged 20) | Krylia Sovetov-SOK Dimitrovgrad | 2008 | | 0 | 0 |
| 38 | Sergei Perunov | (Russia) | DF | 4 June 1990 (aged 19) | Nosta Novotroitsk | 2008 | | 0 | 0 |
| 49 | Dmitri Protopopov | (Kazakhstan) | DF | 23 January 1988 (aged 21) | Ryazan | 2007 | | 0 | 0 |
| 88 | Caner Erkin | (Turkey) | MF | 4 October 1988 (aged 21) | Manisaspor | 2007 | | 49 | 2 |
| 90 | Viktor Klimeyev | (Russia) | DF | 16 January 1990 (aged 19) | Gazovik Orenburg | 2007 | | 0 | 0 |
| | Ruslan Perepelyukov | (Russia) | DF | 15 March 1990 (aged 19) | Academy | 2007 | | 0 | 0 |
| | Nikolai Zaytsev | (Russia) | DF | 1 June 1989 (aged 20) | Kuban Krasnodar | 2008 | | 0 | 0 |
| | Nikita Burmistrov | (Russia) | FW | 6 July 1989 (aged 20) | Academy | 2007 | | 6 | 0 |
| | Sergei Shumilin | (Russia) | FW | 21 February 1990 (aged 19) | Acaademy | 2008 | | 0 | 0 |
Players that left during the season
| 18 | Yuri Zhirkov | (Russia) | MF | 20 August 1983 (aged 26) | Spartak Tambov | 2004 | | 215 | 24 |

=== Out on loan ===
Note: Flags indicate national team as defined under FIFA eligibility rules; some limited exceptions apply. Players may hold more than one non-FIFA nationality.

| No. | Pos. | Nation | Player |
|---|---|---|---|
| 5 | MF | BRA | Ramón (at Krylia Sovetov) |
| 8 | FW | RUS | Dmitri Ryzhov (at Alania Vladikavkaz) |
| 9 | FW | BRA | Vágner Love (at Palmeiras) |
| 19 | FW | POL | Dawid Janczyk (at Lokeren) |
| 21 | MF | CZE | Luboš Kalouda (at Sparta Prague) |
| 36 | DF | RUS | Anton Vlasov (at Anzhi Makhachkala) |
| 44 | DF | KAZ | Dmitri Protopopov (at Stavropolye-2009) |

| No. | Pos. | Nation | Player |
|---|---|---|---|
| 58 | DF | RUS | Sergei Perunov (at Gazovik Orenburg) |
| 88 | MF | TUR | Caner Erkin (at Galatasaray) |
| 90 | DF | RUS | Viktor Klimeyev (at Krylia Sovetov) |
| — | DF | RUS | Ruslan Perepelyukov (at Avangard Podolsk) |
| — | DF | RUS | Nikolai Zaytsev (at Chernomorets Novorossiysk) |
| — | FW | RUS | Nikita Burmistrov (at Shinnik Yaroslavl) |
| — | FW | RUS | Sergei Shumilin (at Sibir Novosibirsk) |

== Transfers ==
=== In ===
| Date | Position | Nationality | Name | From | Fee | Ref. |
|---|---|---|---|---|---|---|
| 1 January 2009 | FW | (Czech Republic) | Tomáš Necid | Slavia Prague | Undisclosed | |
| Winter 2009 | FW | (Niger) | Moussa Maâzou | Lokeren | Undisclosed | |
| 12 August 2009 | MF | (Chile) | Mark González | Real Betis | Undisclosed | |
| 1 September 2009 | MF | (Russia) | Nika Piliyev | Lokomotiv Moscow | Undisclosed | |
| Summer 2009 | DF | (Serbia) | Uroš Ćosić | Red Star Belgrade | Undisclosed | |

=== Loans in ===
| Date from | Position | Nationality | Name | From | Date to | Ref. |
|---|---|---|---|---|---|---|
| 31 July 2009 | MF | (Latvia) | Vitālijs Maksimenko | Daugava Rīga | End of Season | |
| 1 September 2009 | MF | (Liberia) | Sekou Oliseh | Midtjylland | End of Season | |
| 1 September 2009 | FW | (Brazil) | Guilherme | Dynamo Kyiv | End of Season | |

=== Out ===
| Date | Position | Nationality | Name | To | Fee | Ref. |
|---|---|---|---|---|---|---|
| Winter 2009 | GK | (Russia) | Dmitry Abakumov | KAMAZ | Undisclosed | |
| Winter 2009 | GK | (Russia) | Alexandr Chuchalov | Nosta Novotroitsk | Undisclosed | |
| Winter 2009 | MF | (Russia) | Dmitri Arslanov | Kyzylzhar | Undisclosed | |
| Winter 2009 | MF | (Russia) | Maksim Karpov | Dmitrov | Undisclosed | |
| Winter 2009 | MF | (Russia) | Amir Kashiyev | Nosta Novotroitsk | Undisclosed | |
| Winter 2009 | MF | (Russia) | Viktor Vorobyov | Dmitrov | Undisclosed | |
| 7 July 2009 | DF | (Russia) | Yuri Zhirkov | Chelsea | Undisclosed | |
| Summer 2009 | DF | (Russia) | Nikolai Zaytsev | Krasnodar-2000 | Undisclosed | |
| Summer 2009 | MF | (Russia) | Yuri Petrakov | FC Moscow | Undisclosed | |
| Summer 2009 | FW | (Russia) | Alexei Volkov | Druzhba Maykop | Undisclosed | |

=== Loans out ===
| Date from | Position | Nationality | Name | To | Date to | Ref. |
|---|---|---|---|---|---|---|
| 19 January 2009 | FW | (Poland) | Dawid Janczyk | Lokeren | End of Season | |
| Winter 2009 | DF | (Russia) | Ruslan Perepelyukov | Avangard Podolsk | | |
| Winter 2009 | DF | (Russia) | Nikolai Zaytsev | Chernomorets Novorossiysk | Summer 2009 | |
| Winter 2009 | FW | (Niger) | Moussa Maâzou | Lokeren | Summer 2009 | |
| Winter 2009 | FW | (Russia) | Sergei Shumilin | Sibir Novosibirsk | End of Season | |
| 22 June 2009 | MF | (Czech Republic) | Luboš Kalouda | Sparta Prague | Summer 2010 | |
| 15 August 2009 | MF | (Brazil) | Ramón | Krylia Sovetov | End of Season | |
| Summer 2009 | DF | (Russia) | Anton Vlasov | Anzhi Makhachkala | End of Season | |
| Summer 2009 | DF | (Kazakhstan) | Dmitri Protopopov | Stavropolye-2009 | | |
| Summer 2009 | DF | (Russia) | Sergei Perunov | Gazovik Orenburg | | |
| Summer 2009 | DF | (Russia) | Viktor Klimeyev | Krylia Sovetov | | |
| Summer 2009 | MF | (Turkey) | Caner Erkin | Galatasaray | Summer 2010 | |
| Summer 2009 | FW | (Russia) | Dmitri Ryzhov | Alania Vladikavkaz | End of Season | |
| Summer 2009 | FW | (Brazil) | Vágner Love | Palmeiras | End of Season | |

=== Released ===
| Date | Position | Nationality | Name | Joined | Date |
|---|---|---|---|---|---|
| 31 December 2008 | DF | (Russia) | Batraz Zasseyev | | |
| 31 December 2008 | MF | (Russia) | Dmitriy Manoshkin | | |
| 31 December 2008 | MF | (Russia) | Nikolai Zhirkov | | |

== Competitions ==
=== UEFA Cup ===
==== Knockout stage ====
| 18 February 2009 Round of 32 1st leg | Aston Villa (England) | 1 – 1 | (Russia) CSKA Moscow | Birmingham, England |
| 22:00 MSK (UTC+3) | Carew 69'; Young (yellow card) 88' | Report | Vágner Love 14' | Stadium: Villa Park; Attendance: 38,038; Referee: Peter Rasmussen (Denmark) |

| 26 February 2009 Round of 32 2nd leg | CSKA Moscow (Russia) | 2 – 0 (3 – 1 agg.) | (England) Aston Villa | Moscow, Russia |
| 20:00 MSK (UTC+3) | Zhirkov 61'; Dzagoev (yellow card) 83'; Vágner Love 90+3' | Report | Bannan (yellow card) 84'; Albrighton (yellow card) 88' | Stadium: Luzhniki Stadium; Attendance: 25,650; Referee: Felix Brych (Germany) |

| 12 March 2009 Round of 32 1st leg | CSKA Moscow (Russia) | 1 – 0 | (Ukraine) Shakhtar Donetsk | Moscow, Russia |
| 20:00 MSK (UTC+3) | Vágner Love (yellow card) 38' (goal) 50' (pen.); Mamayev (yellow card) 63'; Zhirkov (yellow card) 66' | Report | Chyhrynskyi (yellow card) 18'; Fernandinho (yellow card) 26'; Ischenko (yellow card) 36' | Stadium: Luzhniki Stadium; Attendance: 19,700; Referee: Nicola Rizzoli (Italy) |

| 19 March 2009 Round of 32 2nd leg | Shakhtar Donetsk (Ukraine) | 2 – 0 (2 – 1 agg.) | (Russia) CSKA Moscow | Donetsk, Ukraine |
| 20:30 MSK (UTC+3) | Ischenko (yellow card) 20'; Fernandinho 54' (pen.); Luiz Adriano 70'; Seleznyov (yellow card) 90' | Report | Akinfeev (yellow card) 42'; V.Berezutski (yellow card) 79'; Ryzhov (yellow card) 90' | Stadium: RSK Olimpiyskyi; Attendance: 25,000; Referee: Björn Kuipers (Netherlands) |

=== Super Cup ===
| 7 March 2009 | Rubin Kazan | 1 – 2 (a.e.t.) | CSKA Moscow | Moscow |
| 14:00 MSK (UTC+3) | Adamov (yellow card) 13'; Sharonov 62'; Noboa (yellow card) 67'; Sibaya (yellow card) 82'; Karadeniz (yellow card) 98' (yellow-red card) 105+2'; Gorbanets (yellow card) 115' | Report | V.Berezutski (yellow card) 40'; Šemberas 43' (yellow card) 94'; Dzagoev (yellow card) 72'; Berezutski (yellow card) 86'; Necid 113' (yellow card) 113' | Stadium: Luzhniki Stadium; Attendance: 15,000; Referee: Stanislav Sukhina |

=== Premier League ===
==== Results by round ====
| Round | 1 | 2 | 3 | 4 | 5 | 6 | 7 | 8 | 9 | 10 | 11 | 12 | 13 | 14 | 15 | 16 | 17 | 18 | 19 | 20 | 21 | 22 | 23 | 24 | 25 | 26 | 27 | 28 | 29 | 30 |
|---|---|---|---|---|---|---|---|---|---|---|---|---|---|---|---|---|---|---|---|---|---|---|---|---|---|---|---|---|---|---|
| Ground | A | H | A | H | A | H | A | A | H | A | A | A | A | H | H | A | H | A | H | A | H | H | A | H | A | H | H | H | A | H |
| Result | W | L | D | W | W | L | W | W | W | L | L | D | W | D | L | W | W | L | W | L | W | W | L | W | D | L | W | L | W | W |

Updated to match(es) played on 29 November 2009. Source: See results
A = Away; H = Home; W = Win; D = Draw; L = Loss

==== Results ====
| 15 March 2009 1 | Saturn Moscow | 0 – 3 | CSKA Moscow | Moscow |
| 16:30 MSK (UTC+4) | Angbwa (yellow card) 7' (yellow-red card) 30'; Kovel (yellow card) 14'; Kuzmichyov (yellow card) 21'; Igonin (yellow card) 77' | Report | Mamayev (yellow card) 34'; Carvalho (yellow card) 50'; Dzagoev 69'; Ignashevich 82', 87' | Stadium: Saturn Stadium; Attendance: 15,000; Referee: Vladislav Bezborodov |

| 23 March 2009 2 | CSKA Moscow | 0 – 1 | Tom Tomsk | Moscow |
| 19:00 MSK (UTC+4) | Zhirkov (yellow card) 81' | Report | Maznov 1'; Smirnov (yellow card) 17'; Klimov (yellow card) 37'; Yevsikov (yellow card) 36'; Ivanov (yellow card) 45'; Németh (yellow card) 70'; Pareiko (yellow card) 90' | Stadium: Luzhniki Stadium; Attendance: 10,400; Referee: Vitali Doroshenko |

| 5 April 2009 3 | Amkar Perm | 0 – 0 | CSKA Moscow | Perm |
| 16:30 MSK (UTC+4) | Belorukov (yellow card) 48'; Sirakov (yellow card) 87' | Report | Vágner Love (yellow card) 30'; Šemberas (yellow card) 59' (red card) 59'; V.Berezutski (yellow card) 90' | Stadium: Zvezda Stadium; Attendance: 17,800; Referee: Aleksandr Gvardis |

| 12 April 2009 4 | CSKA Moscow | 4 – 1 | Lokomotiv Moscow | Moscow |
| 14:00 MSK (UTC+4) | Dzagoev 35', 72'; Necid (yellow card) 44'; Zhirkov 55'; V.Berezutski (yellow card) 78'; Maâzou (yellow card) 86' (goal) 87' | Report | Ďurica (yellow card) 34'; Baša 79' | Stadium: Luzhniki Stadium; Attendance: 25,000; Referee: Yuri Baskakov |

| 19 April 2009 5 | Khimki | 0 – 3 | CSKA Moscow | Khimki |
| 16:30 MSK (UTC+4) | Jovanović (yellow card) 77'; Trivunović (yellow card) 78'; Kirakosyan (yellow card) 82' | Report | Krasić 6', 31', 74' | Stadium: Arena Khimki; Attendance: 7,500; Referee: Aleksei Nikolaev |

| 26 April 2009 6 | CSKA Moscow | 1 – 2 | Rostov | Moscow |
| 16:30 MSK (UTC+4) | Rozhkov 18' (o.g.); Zhirkov (yellow card) 56' | Report | Shchennikov 42' (o.g.); Hong 49'; Osinov (penalty missed) 73'; Mandrykin (yellow card) 76'; Ahmetović (yellow card) 78'; Cherkes (yellow card) 90' | Stadium: Luzhniki Stadium; Attendance: 11,000; Referee: Stanislav Sukhina |

| 3 May 2009 7 | Krylia Sovetov Samara | 1 – 3 | CSKA Moscow | Samara |
| 13:00 MSK (UTC+4) | Shishkin (yellow card) 33'; Savin 36' | Report | Odiah (yellow card) 34'; V.Berezutski 63'; Vágner Love 66' (yellow card) 87'; Shchennikov (yellow card) 81' (yellow-red card) 82'; Maâzou 90' | Stadium: Metallurg Stadium; Attendance: 27,100; Referee: Vladimir Pettay |

| 10 May 2009 8 | Dynamo Moscow | 1 – 2 | CSKA Moscow | Moscow |
| 14:00 MSK (UTC+4) | D.Kombarov 5'; Khokhlov (yellow card) 16'; Kowalczyk (yellow card) 29'; Kolodin (yellow card) 55'; Gabulov (yellow card) 76'; K.Kombarov (yellow card) 88' | Report | Erkin (yellow card) 59'; Aldonin (yellow card) 65'; Necid 78'; Zhirkov (yellow card) 80'; Berezutski 90+1' | Stadium: Arena Khimki; Attendance: 10,650; Referee: Aleksandr Kolobaev |

| 17 May 2009 9 | CSKA Moscow | 2 – 1 | Zenit St. Petersburg | Moscow |
| 19:00 MSK (UTC+4) | Maâzou 32'; Šemberas (yellow card) 59'; Erkin (yellow card) 65'; Vágner Love 85' (pen.); Carvalho (yellow card) 90' | Report | Semshov 54'; Hubočan (yellow card) 79' | Stadium: Luzhniki Stadium; Attendance: 21,700; Referee: Stanislav Sukhina |

| 24 May 2009 10 | Kuban Krasnodar | 1 – 0 | CSKA Moscow | Krasnodar |
| 19:00 MSK (UTC+4) | Dzhioyev (yellow card) 36'; Draman (yellow card) 54'; Topchu 60'; Botvinyev (yellow card) 90' | Report | Šemberas (yellow card) 20'; Zhirkov (yellow card) 53'; Krasić (yellow card) 73' | Stadium: Kuban Stadium; Attendance: 32,000; Referee: Alexei Kovalev |

| 14 June 2009 12 | FC Moscow | 2 – 0 | CSKA Moscow | Moscow |
| 14:00 MSK (UTC+4) | Samedov 4'; Krunić 49'; Sheshukov (yellow card) 54' | Report | Aldonin (yellow card) 12'; Carvalho (yellow card) 43'; Shchennikov (yellow card) 45'; Necid (yellow card) 77' | Stadium: Eduard Streltsov Stadium; Attendance: 7,500; Referee: Almir Kayumov |

| 11 July 2009 13 | Terek Grozny | 1 – 1 | CSKA Moscow | Grozny |
| 18:45 MSK (UTC+4) | Zabavník (yellow card) 64'; Pancu 71' (pen.); Petre (yellow card) 81' | Report | Mamayev (yellow card) 32'; Krasić (yellow card) 66'; Necid 68' | Stadium: Sultan Bilimkhanov Stadium; Attendance: 10,200; Referee: Vladislav Bezborodov |

| 18 July 2009 14 | Rubin Kazan | 1 – 2 | CSKA Moscow | Kazan |
| 16:00 MSK (UTC+4) | Ansaldi (yellow card) 45'; Sharonov (yellow card) 54'; Domínguez 55' (pen.) (yellow card) 56' | Report | V.Berezutski (yellow card) 42'; Akinfeev (yellow card) 56'; Ignashevich 76'; Vágner Love 79' | Stadium: Central Stadium; Attendance: 23,200; Referee: V.Popov |

| 22 July 2009 11 | CSKA Moscow | 0 – 0 | Spartak Nalchik | Moscow |
| 20:00 MSK (UTC+4) | | Report | Geteriev (yellow card) 48'; Džudović (yellow card) 50' | Stadium: Luzhniki Stadium; Attendance: 9,100; Referee: Vitali Doroshenko |

| 26 July 2009 15 | CSKA Moscow | 1 – 2 | Spartak Moscow | Moscow |
| 16:00 MSK (UTC+4) | Šemberas 13' (yellow card) 25'; Akinfeev (yellow card) 90' | Report | Alex 24', 65' (pen.); Makeyev (yellow card) 33'; Covalciuc (yellow card) 40' (yellow-red card) 67'; Welliton (yellow card) 90' | Stadium: Luzhniki Stadium; Attendance: 58,000; Referee: Aleksandr Kolobaev |

| 1 August 2009 16 | Tom Tomsk | 2 – 3 | CSKA Moscow | Tomsk |
| 13:30 MSK (UTC+4) | Smirnov (yellow card) 51' Maznov 58'; Michkov (yellow card) 59' (goal) 67' (pen.) | Report | Krasić 27'; Dzagoev 30'; Jesus 64'; Ignashevich (yellow card) 66' | Stadium: Trud Stadium; Attendance: 14,000; Referee: Aleksandr Gvardis |

| 9 August 2009 17 | CSKA Moscow | 1 – 0 | Amkar Perm | Moscow |
| 18:30 MSK (UTC+4) | Mamayev (yellow card) 71'; Ignashevich (yellow card) 76'; Necid 90' | Report | Pomerko (yellow card) 32'; Zhilyayev (yellow card) 60' | Stadium: Luzhniki Stadium; Attendance: 6,000; Referee: Alexei Kovalev |

| 16 August 2009 18 | Lokomotiv Moscow | 2 – 1 | CSKA Moscow | Moscow |
| 16:00 MSK (UTC+4) | Bilyaletdinov 43'; Sychev 90' | Report | Dzagoev (yellow card) 38' (goal) 60'; Krasić (yellow card) 66' | Stadium: Lokomotiv Stadium; Attendance: 23,141; Referee: Maksim Layushkin |

| 22 August 2009 19 | CSKA Moscow | 2 – 1 | Khimki | Moscow |
| 18:15 MSK (UTC+4) | Necid 14'; Krasić 22' | Report | Antipenko 69' | Stadium: Luzhniki Stadium; Attendance: 7,000; Referee: Vladislav Bezborodov |

| 30 August 2009 20 | Rostov | 1 – 0 | CSKA Moscow | Rostov-on-Don |
| 20:30 MSK (UTC+4) | Gațcan (yellow card) 10'; Akimov (yellow card) 72'; Osinov 83'; Gerus (yellow card) 87' | Report | Ignashevich (yellow card) 76'; Krasić (yellow card) 78' | Stadium: Olimp – 2 Attendance: 15,800; Referee: Vladimir Pettay |

| 12 September 2009 21 | CSKA Moscow | 3 – 0 | Krylia Sovetov Samara | Moscow |
| 16:15 MSK (UTC+4) | Necid 57'; Guilherme 60', 81' | Report | Koller (yellow card) 57'; Leilton (yellow card) 59'; Kalachev (red card) 67' | Stadium: Luzhniki Stadium; Attendance: 9,400; Referee: Stanislav Sukhina |

| 20 September 2009 22 | CSKA Moscow | 3 – 0 | Dynamo Moscow | Moscow |
| 14:00 MSK (UTC+4) | Mamayev 55' (yellow card) 79'; Krasić 84'; Guilherme 87' | Report | Kowalczyk (yellow card) 17' | Stadium: Luzhniki Stadium; Attendance: 12,000; Referee: Vladislav Bezborodov |

| 26 September 2009 23 | Zenit St. Petersburg | 2 – 0 | CSKA Moscow | Saint Petersburg |
| 14:00 MSK (UTC+4) | Kežman (yellow card) 33' (goal) 45+1'; Huszti (yellow card) 35'; Bystrov (yellow card) 49' (goal) 87'; Meira (yellow card) 77' | Report | Krasić (yellow card) 20'; Guilherme (yellow card) 37'; González (yellow card) 49'; Šemberas (yellow card) 60'; Dzagoev (yellow card) 70'; V.Berezutski (yellow card) 77' | Stadium: Petrovsky Stadium; Attendance: 21,500; Referee: Stanislav Sukhina |

| 4 October 2009 24 | CSKA Moscow | 4 – 0 | Kuban Krasnodar | Moscow |
| 16:15 MSK (UTC+4) | Shchennikov (yellow card) 40'; Odiah (yellow card) 55'; González 64', 76'; Krasić 73'; Oliseh 79'; Grigoryev (yellow card) 84' | Report | Khagush (yellow card) 29'; Babangida (yellow card) 78' | Stadium: Luzhniki Stadium; Attendance: 9,000; Referee: Vladimir Pettay |

| 17 October 2009 25 | Spartak Nalchik | 1 – 1 | CSKA Moscow | Nalchik |
| 14:00 MSK (UTC+4) | Amisulashvili 26'; Mashukov (yellow card) 33'; Ferreira (yellow card) 71' | Report | Krasić 2' (yellow card) 33'; Necid (yellow card) 84'; Odiah (yellow card) 90' | Stadium: Spartak Stadium; Attendance: 10,010; Referee: Vladislav Bezborodov |

| 25 October 2009 26 | CSKA Moscow | 1 – 3 | FC Moscow | Moscow |
| 14:00 MSK (UTC+4) | Akinfeev (yellow card) 20'; Odiah (yellow card) 29'; Grigoryev (yellow card) 37'; Necid 83' | Report | Dmitri Tarasov 10' (yellow card) 25'; Rebko 20' (pen.); Epureanu 39' (yellow card) 62' | Stadium: Luzhniki Stadium; Attendance: 5,600; Referee: Almir Kayumov |

| 30 October 2009 27 | CSKA Moscow | 1 – 0 | Terek Grozny | Moscow |
| 18:00 MSK (UTC+4) | Necid 4' (yellow card) 23' | Report | | Stadium: Luzhniki Stadium; Attendance: 3,700; Referee: Vladimir Pettay |

| 8 November 2009 28 | CSKA Moscow | 0 – 2 | Rubin Kazan | Moscow |
| 14:00 MSK (UTC+4) | Dzagoev (yellow card) 37'; A.Berezutski (yellow card) 65'; Shchennikov (yellow card) 69' | Report | Navas (yellow card) 54'; Semak (yellow card) 56'; Domínguez 66'; Noboa (yellow card) 73'; Bukharov 90' | Stadium: Luzhniki Stadium; Attendance: 11,500; Referee: Stanislav Sukhina |

| 21 November 2009 29 | Spartak Moscow | 2 – 3 | CSKA Moscow | Moscow |
| 14:00 MSK (UTC+4) | Alex 6' (pen.) (yellow card) 90'; Stranzl (yellow card) 38'; Welliton 65'; Covalciuc (yellow card) 85' | Report | Akinfeev (yellow card) 6'; A.Berezutski (yellow card) 39'; Dzagoev 45'; Necid 49', 88' (yellow card) 90' | Stadium: Lokomotiv Stadium; Attendance: 62,000; Referee: Yuri Baskakov |

| 29 November 2009 30 | CSKA Moscow | 3 – 0 | Saturn Moscow | Moscow |
| 14:00 MSK (UTC+4) | Dzagoev 33'; Krasić 58' (yellow card) 59'; Mamayev 66' | Report | Nakhushev (yellow card) 80'; Zelão (yellow card) 86' | Stadium: Luzhniki Stadium; Attendance: 7,500; Referee: Vladislav Bezborodov |

==== League table ====
| Pos | Team | Pld | W | D | L | GF | GA | GD | Pts | Qualification or relegation |
|---|---|---|---|---|---|---|---|---|---|---|
| 3 | Zenit St. Petersburg | 30 | 15 | 9 | 6 | 48 | 27 | +21 | 54 | Qualification to Champions League third qualifying round (Note: Winners of 2009–10 Russian Cup, Zenit, qualified for the Champions League, that means the loser finalists Sibir Novosibirsk will play in third qualifying round of the UEFA Europa League.) |
| 4 | Lokomotiv Moscow | 30 | 15 | 9 | 6 | 43 | 30 | +13 | 54 | Qualification to Europa League play-off round |
| 5 | CSKA Moscow | 30 | 16 | 4 | 10 | 48 | 30 | +18 | 52 | Qualification to Europa League play-off round |
| 6 | FC Moscow (R) | 30 | 13 | 9 | 8 | 39 | 28 | +11 | 48 | Club expelled after season (Note: FC Moscow announced on 5 February 2010 that they will not participate in next season's Russian Premier League. On 17 February, they were officially excluded from the 2010 Russian Premier League.) |
| 7 | Saturn | 30 | 13 | 6 | 11 | 38 | 41 | −3 | 45 | |

Source: RFPL (in Russian)
Rules for classification: 1st points; 2nd matches won; 3rd head-to-head (points, matches won, goal difference, goals scored, away goals scored); 4th goal difference; 5th goals scored; 6th away goals scored; 7th position in previous season or decision game
(R) Relegated

=== Russian Cup ===
==== 2008–2009 ====
| 22 April 2009 Quarterfinals | Lokomotiv Moscow | 0 – 1 | CSKA Moscow | Moscow |
| 19:00 MSK (UTC+4) | Dujmović (yellow card) 90' | Report | Necid 57'; Krasić (yellow card) 61'; Dzagoev (yellow card) 64' | Stadium: Lokomotiv Stadium; Attendance: 15,840; Referee: Maksim Layushkin |

| 13 May 2009 Semifinal | Dynamo Moscow | 2 – 2 (a.e.t.) (5 – 6 p) | CSKA Moscow | Moscow |
| 19:30 MSK (UTC+4) | Granat (yellow card) 39'; Dimidko (yellow card) 60'; Wilkshire (yellow card) 68'; Khokhlov 86'; Kerzhakov 90+3' (pen.); A.Denisov (yellow card) 102' | Report | Vágner Love 40' (pen.); Zhirkov 53' (yellow card) 120'; Rahimić (yellow card) 74'; Erkin (yellow card) 78'; Šemberas (yellow card) 90'; Aldonin (yellow card) 112' | Stadium: Arena Khimki; Attendance: 6,068; Referee: Almir Kayumov |
| | Penalties |
| | Kerzhakov (penalty scored); D.Kombarov (penalty scored); Kolodin (penalty scored); Wilkshire (penalty scored); Khokhlov (penalty missed); Smolov (penalty scored); Dimidko (penalty missed); Kokorin (penalty missed) | | (penalty scored) Carvalho; (penalty scored) Vágner Love; (penalty scored) Zhirkov; (penalty scored) Ignashevich; (penalty missed) Necid; (penalty scored) Schennikov; (penalty missed) Aldonin; (penalty scored) V.Berezutskiy |

===== Final =====
31 May 2009
14:00 MSK (UTC+4)

| Rubin Kazan | 0 – 1 | CSKA Moscow |
|---|---|---|
| | Report | Aldonin 90+2' |

Arena Khimki, Moscow
Attendance: 13,000
Referee: Stanislav Sukhina

Rubin Kazan
CSKA

FC Rubin Kazan:
| GK | 77 | (Russia) Sergey Ryzhikov |
| DF | 3 | (Argentina) Cristian Ansaldi |
| DF | 4 | (Spain) César Navas | (yellow card) 82' |
| DF | 76 | (Russia) Roman Sharonov (c) | (yellow card) 89' |
| MF | 6 | (South Africa) MacBeth Sibaya |
| MF | 15 | (Russia) Aleksandr Ryazantsev | (yellow card) 22' (substituted off) 76' |
| MF | 16 | (Ecuador) Christian Noboa | (yellow card) 36' |
| MF | 23 | (Russia) Yevgeni Balyaikin | (yellow card) 59' |
| MF | 61 | (Turkey) Gökdeniz Karadeniz | (yellow card) 78' |
| FW | 10 | (Argentina) Alejandro Damián Domínguez |
| FW | 99 | (Turkey) Hasan Kabze | (substituted off) 86' |
Substitutes:
| GK | 1 | (Russia) Sergei Kozko |
| DF | 2 | (Croatia) Stjepan Tomas |
| DF | 22 | (Russia) Aleksandr Orekhov |
| MF | 5 | (Russia) Pyotr Bystrov | (substituted on) 86' |
| MF | 14 | (Ukraine) Serhii Rebrov |
| FW | 11 | (Russia) Aleksandr Bukharov | (substituted on) 76' |
| FW | 21 | (Russia) Roman Adamov |
Manager:
(Turkmenistan) Kurban Berdyev Assistant referees: Oleg Tselovalnikov (Astrakhan); Sergei Panteleyev (Tula)

PFC CSKA Moscow:
| GK | 35 | (Russia) Igor Akinfeev (c) |
| DF | 2 | (Lithuania) Deividas Šemberas |
| DF | 4 | (Russia) Sergei Ignashevich |
| DF | 24 | (Russia) Vasili Berezutski |
| DF | 42 | (Russia) Georgi Schennikov |
| MF | 11 | (Russia) Pavel Mamayev | (red card) 13' |
| MF | 18 | (Russia) Yuri Zhirkov | (yellow card) 90' |
| MF | 22 | (Russia) Evgeni Aldonin | (yellow card) 56' |
| FW | 7 | (Brazil) Daniel Carvalho | (substituted off) 90' |
| FW | 9 | (Brazil) Vágner Love |
| FW | 12 | (Niger) Moussa Maâzou | (substituted off) 72' |
Substitutes:
| GK | 33 | (Russia) Yevgeny Pomazan |
| DF | 6 | (Russia) Aleksei Berezutski | (substituted on) 90' |
| DF | 15 | (Nigeria) Chidi Odiah |
| MF | 10 | (Russia) Alan Dzagoev |
| MF | 17 | (Serbia) Miloš Krasić | (substituted on) 72' |
| MF | 88 | (Turkey) Caner Erkin |
| FW | 89 | (Czech Republic) Tomáš Necid |
Manager:
(Brazil) Zico

==== 2009–2010 ====
| 15 July 2009 Round of 32 | Ural Sverdlovsk Oblast | 1 – 0 | CSKA Moscow | Yekaterinburg |
| 17:00 MSK (UTC+4) | Fidler (yellow card) 36'; Klimavičius (yellow card) 51'; Shishelov 56'; Shchanitsyn (yellow card) 79'; Solosin (yellow card) 90' | Report | Dzagoev (yellow card) 85' | Stadium: Uralmash Stadium; Referee: Vladimir Kazmenko |

=== UEFA Champions League ===
==== Group stage ====
| Pos | Team | Pld | W | D | L | GF | GA | GD | Pts | Qualification |
|---|---|---|---|---|---|---|---|---|---|---|
| 1 | (England) Manchester United | 6 | 4 | 1 | 1 | 10 | 6 | +4 | 13 | Advance to knockout phase |
| 2 | (Russia) CSKA Moscow | 6 | 3 | 1 | 2 | 10 | 10 | 0 | 10 | Advance to knockout phase |
| 3 | (Germany) VfL Wolfsburg | 6 | 2 | 1 | 3 | 9 | 8 | +1 | 7 | Transfer to Europa League |
| 4 | (Turkey) Beşiktaş | 6 | 1 | 1 | 4 | 3 | 8 | −5 | 4 | |

Source: RSSSF

| 15 September 2009 1 | Wolfsburg (Germany) | 3 – 1 | (Russia) CSKA Moscow | Wolfsburg, Germany |
| 22:45 MSK (UTC+4) | Grafite 36', 41' (pen.), 87' | Report | Rahimić (yellow card) 34'; Dzagoev 76' | Stadium: Volkswagen Arena; Attendance: 25,017; Referee: Stéphane Lannoy (France) |

| 30 September 2009 2 | CSKA Moscow (Russia) | 2 – 1 | (Turkey) Beşiktaş | Moscow, Russia |
| 20:30 MSK (UTC+4) | Dzagoev 7'; A.Berezutski (yellow card) 35'; Odiah (yellow card) 37'; Krasić 61' (yellow card) 61'; Ignashevich (yellow card) 82' | Report | Köybaşı (yellow card) 21'; Sivok (yellow card) 79'; Dağ 90+2' | Stadium: Luzhniki Stadium; Attendance: 19,750; Referee: Manuel Mejuto González (Spain) |

| 21 October 2009 3 | CSKA Moscow (Russia) | 0 – 1 | (England) Manchester United | Moscow, Russia |
| 20:30 MSK (UTC+4) | | Report | Berbatov (yellow card) 53'; Valencia 86' | Stadium: Luzhniki Stadium; Attendance: 51,250; Referee: Claus Bo Larsen (Denmark) |

| 3 November 2009 4 | Manchester United (England) | 3 – 3 | (Russia) CSKA Moscow | Manchester, England |
| 20:45 MSK (UTC+3) | Owen 29'; Fletcher (yellow card) 50'; Macheda (yellow card) 75'; Scholes 84'; Obertan (yellow card) 90'; Valencia 90+2' | Report | Dzagoev 25'; Necid (yellow card) 25'; Krasić 31'; V. Berezutski 47'; Aldonin (yellow card) 54'; Šemberas (yellow card) 72' (yellow-red card) 90+5'; Carvalho (yellow card) 89' | Stadium: Old Trafford; Attendance: 73,718; Referee: Olegário Benquerença (Portugal) |

| 25 November 2009 5 | CSKA Moscow (Russia) | 2 – 1 | (Germany) Wolfsburg | Moscow, Russia |
| 20:30 MSK (UTC+3) | Necid 58'; Krasić 66' | Report | Džeko 19'; Madlung (yellow card) 87' | Stadium: Luzhniki Stadium; Attendance: 13,478; Referee: Nicola Rizzoli (Italy) |

| 8 December 2009 6 | Beşiktaş (Turkey) | 1 – 2 | (Russia) CSKA Moscow | Istanbul, Turkey |
| 22:45 MSK (UTC+3) | Fink (yellow card) 66'; Toraman (yellow card) 85'; Bobô 86'; Sivok (yellow card) 90' | Report | Odiah (yellow card) 27'; Mamayev (yellow card) 37'; Krasić 41' (yellow card) 42'; Aldonin 90+5' | Stadium: BJK İnönü Stadium; Attendance: 16,129; Referee: Martin Hansson (Sweden) |

== Statistics ==
As of match played 8 December 2009

=== Appearances and goals ===
| No. | Pos | Nat | Player | Total | | Premier League | | 2008-09 Russian Cup | | 2009-10 Russian Cup | | Super Cup | | UEFA Cup | | Champions League | |
| No. | Pos | Nat | Player | Apps | Goals | Apps | Goals | Apps | Goals | Apps | Goals | Apps | Goals | Apps | Goals | Apps | Goals |
|---|---|---|---|---|---|---|---|---|---|---|---|---|---|---|---|---|---|
| 2 | DF | (Lithuania) LTU | Deividas Šemberas | 38 | 2 | 25+1 | 1 | 2 | 0 | 1 | 0 | 1 | 1 | 3 | 0 | 5 | 0 |
| 4 | DF | (Russia) RUS | Sergei Ignashevich | 43 | 3 | 29 | 3 | 3 | 0 | 1 | 0 | 1 | 0 | 4 | 0 | 5 | 0 |
| 6 | DF | (Russia) RUS | Aleksei Berezutski | 28 | 0 | 15+1 | 0 | 0+1 | 0 | 1 | 0 | 1 | 0 | 4 | 0 | 5 | 0 |
| 7 | MF | (Brazil) BRA | Daniel Carvalho | 21 | 0 | 11+2 | 0 | 2 | 0 | 0+1 | 0 | 0+1 | 0 | 0+2 | 0 | 0+2 | 0 |
| 10 | MF | (Russia) RUS | Alan Dzagoev | 40 | 10 | 26+1 | 7 | 1 | 0 | 1 | 0 | 1 | 0 | 4 | 0 | 6 | 3 |
| 11 | MF | (Russia) RUS | Pavel Mamayev | 40 | 2 | 26+2 | 2 | 3 | 0 | 0 | 0 | 0 | 0 | 1+2 | 0 | 4+2 | 0 |
| 12 | FW | (Niger) NIG | Moussa Maâzou | 19 | 3 | 6+9 | 3 | 2+1 | 0 | 1 | 0 | 0 | 0 | 0 | 0 | 0 | 0 |
| 13 | MF | (Chile) CHI | Mark González | 6 | 2 | 4+1 | 2 | 0 | 0 | 0 | 0 | 0 | 0 | 0 | 0 | 1 | 0 |
| 14 | FW | (Brazil) BRA | Ricardo Jesus | 6 | 1 | 1+5 | 1 | 0 | 0 | 0 | 0 | 0 | 0 | 0 | 0 | 0 | 0 |
| 15 | DF | (Nigeria) NGR | Chidi Odiah | 18 | 0 | 11+2 | 0 | 1 | 0 | 1 | 0 | 0 | 0 | 0 | 0 | 3 | 0 |
| 17 | MF | (Serbia) SRB | Miloš Krasić | 40 | 13 | 22+4 | 9 | 1+1 | 0 | 0+1 | 0 | 1 | 0 | 4 | 0 | 6 | 4 |
| 20 | FW | (Brazil) BRA | Guilherme | 6 | 3 | 2+3 | 3 | 0 | 0 | 0 | 0 | 0 | 0 | 0 | 0 | 1 | 0 |
| 22 | MF | (Russia) RUS | Evgeni Aldonin | 37 | 2 | 24+4 | 0 | 3 | 1 | 0 | 0 | 0 | 0 | 1+1 | 0 | 4 | 1 |
| 23 | MF | (Russia) RUS | Nika Piliyev | 7 | 0 | 2+2 | 0 | 0 | 0 | 0 | 0 | 0 | 0 | 0 | 0 | 0+3 | 0 |
| 24 | DF | (Russia) RUS | Vasili Berezutski | 42 | 3 | 28 | 2 | 3 | 0 | 0 | 0 | 1 | 0 | 4 | 0 | 6 | 1 |
| 26 | MF | (Liberia) LBR | Sekou Oliseh | 6 | 1 | 0+5 | 1 | 0 | 0 | 0 | 0 | 0 | 0 | 0 | 0 | 0+1 | 0 |
| 35 | GK | (Russia) RUS | Igor Akinfeev | 45 | 0 | 30 | 0 | 3 | 0 | 1 | 0 | 1 | 0 | 4 | 0 | 6 | 0 |
| 42 | DF | (Russia) RUS | Georgi Schennikov | 40 | 0 | 20+5 | 0 | 2+1 | 0 | 1 | 0 | 1 | 0 | 4 | 0 | 5+1 | 0 |
| 25 | MF | (Bosnia and Herzegovina) BIH | Elvir Rahimić | 22 | 0 | 2+8 | 0 | 0+1 | 0 | 1 | 0 | 1 | 0 | 3 | 0 | 4+2 | 0 |
| 50 | DF | (Russia) RUS | Anton Grigoryev | 6 | 0 | 4 | 0 | 0 | 0 | 0 | 0 | 0 | 0 | 0 | 0 | 0+2 | 0 |
| 89 | FW | (Czech Republic) CZE | Tomáš Necid | 37 | 12 | 14+13 | 9 | 1+1 | 1 | 1 | 0 | 0+1 | 1 | 0 | 0 | 5+1 | 1 |
Players that left CSKA Moscow on loan during the season:
| 5 | MF | (Brazil) BRA | Ramón | 1 | 0 | 0 | 0 | 0 | 0 | 0 | 0 | 0+1 | 0 | 0 | 0 | 0 | 0 |
| 8 | FW | (Russia) RUS | Dmitri Ryzhov | 4 | 0 | 0+2 | 0 | 0 | 0 | 1 | 0 | 0 | 0 | 0+1 | 0 | 0 | 0 |
| 9 | FW | (Brazil) BRA | Vágner Love | 21 | 7 | 12+1 | 3 | 2 | 1 | 0+1 | 0 | 1 | 0 | 4 | 3 | 0 | 0 |
| 21 | MF | (Czech Republic) CZE | Luboš Kalouda | 5 | 0 | 1+3 | 0 | 0 | 0 | 0 | 0 | 0 | 0 | 0+1 | 0 | 0 | 0 |
| 88 | MF | (Turkey) TUR | Caner Erkin | 11 | 0 | 5+2 | 0 | 1 | 0 | 0 | 0 | 0 | 0 | 1+2 | 0 | 0 | 0 |
Players who appeared for CSKA Moscow that left during the season:
| 18 | DF | (Russia) RUS | Yuri Zhirkov | 17 | 3 | 10 | 1 | 3 | 1 | 0 | 0 | 1 | 0 | 3 | 1 | 0 | 0 |

=== Goal scorers ===
| Place | Position | Nation | Number | Name | Premier League | 2008-09 Russian Cup | 2009-10 Russian Cup | Super Cup | UEFA Cup | UEFA Champions League | Total |
|---|---|---|---|---|---|---|---|---|---|---|---|
| 1 | MF | (Serbia) | 17 | Miloš Krasić | 9 | 0 | 0 | 0 | 0 | 4 | 13 |
| 2 | FW | (Czech Republic) | 89 | Tomáš Necid | 9 | 1 | 0 | 1 | 0 | 1 | 12 |
| 3 | MF | (Russia) | 10 | Alan Dzagoev | 7 | 0 | 0 | 0 | 0 | 3 | 10 |
| 4 | FW | (Brazil) | 9 | Vágner Love | 3 | 1 | 0 | 0 | 3 | 0 | 7 |
| 5 | MF | (Niger) | 12 | Moussa Maâzou | 3 | 0 | 0 | 0 | 0 | 0 | 3 |
| 5 | FW | (Brazil) | 20 | Guilherme | 3 | 0 | 0 | 0 | 0 | 0 | 3 |
| 5 | DF | (Russia) | 4 | Sergei Ignashevich | 3 | 0 | 0 | 0 | 0 | 0 | 3 |
| 5 | DF | (Russia) | 24 | Vasili Berezutski | 2 | 0 | 0 | 0 | 0 | 1 | 3 |
| 5 | MF | (Russia) | 18 | Yuri Zhirkov | 1 | 1 | 0 | 0 | 1 | 0 | 3 |
| 10 | MF | (Russia) | 11 | Pavel Mamayev | 2 | 0 | 0 | 0 | 0 | 0 | 2 |
| 10 | MF | (Chile) | 13 | Mark González | 2 | 0 | 0 | 0 | 0 | 0 | 2 |
| 10 | DF | (Lithuania) | 2 | Deividas Šemberas | 1 | 0 | 0 | 1 | 0 | 0 | 2 |
| 10 | MF | (Russia) | 22 | Evgeni Aldonin | 0 | 1 | 0 | 0 | 0 | 1 | 2 |
| 14 | FW | (Brazil) | 14 | Ricardo Jesus | 1 | 0 | 0 | 0 | 0 | 0 | 1 |
| 14 | MF | (Liberia) | 26 | Sekou Oliseh | 1 | 0 | 0 | 0 | 0 | 0 | 1 |
| 14 | | | | Own goal | 1 | 0 | 0 | 0 | 0 | 0 | 1 |
| | | | | TOTALS | 48 | 4 | '0 | 2 | 4 | 10 | 68 |

=== Clean sheets ===
| Place | Position | Nation | Number | Name | Premier League | 2008-09 Russian Cup | 2009-10 Russian Cup | Super Cup | UEFA Cup | UEFA Champions League | Total |
|---|---|---|---|---|---|---|---|---|---|---|---|
| 1 | GK | (Russia) | 35 | Igor Akinfeev | 10 | 2 | 0 | 0 | 2 | 0 | 14 |
| | | | | TOTALS | 10 | 2 | '0 | 0 | 2 | 0 | 14 |

=== Disciplinary record ===
| Number | Nation | Position | Name | Premier League | | 2008-09 Russian Cup | | 2009-10 Russian Cup | | Super Cup | | UEFA Cup | | UEFA Champions League | | Total | |
| Number | Nation | Position | Name | Yellow card | Red card | Yellow card | Red card | Yellow card | Red card | Yellow card | Red card | Yellow card | Red card | Yellow card | Red card | Yellow card | Red card |
| 2 | (Lithuania) | DF | Deividas Šemberas | 6 | 1 | 1 | 0 | 0 | 0 | 1 | 0 | 0 | 0 | 2 | 1 | 10 | 2 |
| 4 | (Russia) | DF | Sergei Ignashevich | 3 | 0 | 0 | 0 | 0 | 0 | 0 | 0 | 0 | 0 | 1 | 0 | 4 | 0 |
| 6 | (Russia) | DF | Aleksei Berezutski | 2 | 0 | 0 | 0 | 0 | 0 | 1 | 0 | 0 | 0 | 1 | 0 | 4 | 0 |
| 7 | (Brazil) | MF | Daniel Carvalho | 3 | 0 | 0 | 0 | 0 | 0 | 0 | 0 | 0 | 0 | 1 | 0 | 4 | 0 |
| 10 | (Russia) | MF | Alan Dzagoev | 3 | 0 | 1 | 0 | 1 | 0 | 1 | 0 | 1 | 0 | 0 | 0 | 7 | 0 |
| 11 | (Russia) | MF | Pavel Mamayev | 4 | 0 | 0 | 1 | 0 | 0 | 0 | 0 | 1 | 0 | 1 | 0 | 6 | 1 |
| 12 | (Niger) | FW | Moussa Maâzou | 1 | 0 | 0 | 0 | 0 | 0 | 0 | 0 | 0 | 0 | 0 | 0 | 1 | 0 |
| 13 | (Chile) | MF | Mark González | 1 | 0 | 0 | 0 | 0 | 0 | 0 | 0 | 0 | 0 | 0 | 0 | 1 | 0 |
| 15 | (Nigeria) | DF | Chidi Odiah | 4 | 0 | 0 | 0 | 0 | 0 | 0 | 0 | 0 | 0 | 2 | 0 | 6 | 0 |
| 17 | (Serbia) | MF | Miloš Krasić | 7 | 0 | 1 | 0 | 0 | 0 | 0 | 0 | 0 | 0 | 2 | 0 | 10 | 0 |
| 20 | (Brazil) | FW | Guilherme | 1 | 0 | 0 | 0 | 0 | 0 | 0 | 0 | 0 | 0 | 0 | 0 | 1 | 0 |
| 22 | (Russia) | MF | Evgeni Aldonin | 2 | 0 | 2 | 0 | 0 | 0 | 0 | 0 | 0 | 0 | 1 | 0 | 4 | 0 |
| 24 | (Russia) | DF | Vasili Berezutski | 3 | 0 | 0 | 0 | 0 | 0 | 1 | 0 | 1 | 0 | 0 | 0 | 5 | 0 |
| 25 | (Bosnia and Herzegovina) | MF | Elvir Rahimić | 0 | 0 | 1 | 0 | 0 | 0 | 0 | 0 | 0 | 0 | 1 | 0 | 2 | 0 |
| 35 | (Russia) | GK | Igor Akinfeev | 4 | 0 | 0 | 0 | 0 | 0 | 0 | 0 | 1 | 0 | 0 | 0 | 5 | 0 |
| 42 | (Russia) | DF | Georgi Schennikov | 5 | 1 | 0 | 0 | 0 | 0 | 0 | 0 | 0 | 0 | 0 | 0 | 5 | 1 |
| 50 | (Russia) | DF | Anton Grigoryev | 2 | 0 | 0 | 0 | 0 | 0 | 0 | 0 | 0 | 0 | 0 | 0 | 2 | 0 |
| 89 | (Czech Republic) | FW | Tomáš Necid | 5 | 0 | 0 | 0 | 0 | 0 | 1 | 0 | 0 | 0 | 1 | 0 | 7 | 0 |
Players away on loan:
| 8 | (Russia) | MF | Dmitri Ryzhov | 0 | 0 | 0 | 0 | 0 | 0 | 0 | 0 | 1 | 0 | 0 | 0 | 1 | 0 |
| 9 | (Brazil) | FW | Vágner Love | 2 | 1 | 0 | 0 | 0 | 0 | 0 | 0 | 1 | 0 | 0 | 0 | 3 | 1 |
| 88 | (Turkey) | MF | Caner Erkin | 2 | 0 | 1 | 0 | 0 | 0 | 0 | 0 | 0 | 0 | 0 | 0 | 3 | 0 |
Players who left CSKA Moscow during the season:
| 18 | (Russia) | MF | Yuri Zhirkov | 4 | 0 | 2 | 0 | 0 | 0 | 0 | 0 | 1 | 0 | 0 | 0 | 7 | 0 |
| | | | TOTALS | 64 | 3 | 9 | 1 | 1 | 0 | 5 | 0 | 7 | 0 | 13 | 1 | 99 | 5 |
