= 2009 Russian Super Cup =

Association football competition in Russia

The 2009 Russian Super Cup was the 7th Russian Super Cup match, a football match which was contested between the 2008 Russian Premier League champion, Rubin Kazan, and the winner of 2007–08 Russian Cup, CSKA Moscow. The match was held on 7 March 2009 at the Luzhniki Stadium in Moscow, Russia. CSKA Moscow beat Rubin Kazan 2–1 in extra time, after the normal time had finished in a 1–1 draw, to win their fourth Russian Super Cup.

== Match details ==
7 March 2009
14:00 MSK

Rubin Kazan	1–2 (a.e.t.)	CSKA Moscow
Sharonov 62'	Report	Šemberas 43'; Necid 113'

Luzhniki, Moscow
Attendance: 15,000
Referee: Stanislav Sukhina (Malakhovka)

GK	77	(Russia) Sergei Ryzhikov
DF	4	(Spain) César Navas
DF	9	(Georgia (country)) Lasha Salukvadze
DF	27	(Georgia (country)) Dato Kvirkvelia
DF	76	(Russia) Roman Sharonov
MF	5	(Russia) Petr Bystrov		(substituted off) 46'
MF	6	(South Africa) MacBeth Sibaya	(yellow card) 82'
MF	7	(Russia) Sergei Semak (c)
MF	14	(Ukraine) Serhii Rebrov		(substituted off) 60'
MF	16	(Ecuador) Christian Noboa	(yellow card) 67'	(substituted off) 99'
FW	21	(Russia) Roman Adamov	(yellow card) 13'
Substitutes:
GK	30	(Russia) Yevgeni Cheremisin
DF	3	(Argentina) Cristian Ansaldi
MF	15	(Russia) Aleksandr Ryazantsev		(substituted in) 60'
MF	23	(Russia) Yevgeni Balyaikin
MF	32	(Russia) Andrei Gorbanets	(yellow card) 115'	(substituted in) 99'
MF	61	(Turkey) Gökdeniz Karadeniz	(yellow card) 98' (yellow-red card) 105+2'	(substituted in) 46'
FW	11	(Russia) Aleksandr Bukharov
Manager:
(Turkmenistan) Gurban Berdiýew Assistant referees: Nikolai Golubev (Saint Petersburg); Sergei Panteleev (Tula); Fourth official: Vladimir Pettay (Petrozavodsk)

GK	35	(Russia) Igor Akinfeev (c)
DF	2	(Lithuania) Deividas Šemberas	(yellow card) 94'
DF	4	(Russia) Sergei Ignashevich
DF	6	(Russia) Aleksei Berezutskiy	(yellow card) 86'
DF	24	(Russia) Vasili Berezutskiy	(yellow card) 40'
DF	42	(Russia) Georgi Schennikov
MF	10	(Russia) Alan Dzagoev	(yellow card) 72'	(substituted off) 78'
MF	17	(Serbia) Miloš Krasić		(substituted off) 78'
MF	18	(Russia) Yuri Zhirkov
MF	25	(Bosnia and Herzegovina) Elvir Rahimić		(substituted off) 103'
FW	9	(Brazil) Vágner Love
Substitutes:
GK	33	(Russia) Yevgeni Pomazan
DF	15	(Nigeria) Chidi Odiah
MF	5	(Brazil) Ramón		(substituted in) 103'
MF	7	(Brazil) Daniel Carvalho		(substituted in) 78'
MF	11	(Russia) Pavel Mamaev
MF	88	(Turkey) Caner Erkin
FW	89	(Czech Republic) Tomáš Necid	(yellow card) 113'	(substituted in) 78'
Manager:
(Brazil) Zico

== See also ==
- 2009 in Russian football
- 2008 Russian Premier League
- 2007–08 Russian Cup
