= 2008–09 Russian Cup =

Tournament details
- Country: Russia

Final positions
- Champions: CSKA Moscow
- Runners-up: Rubin Kazan

The 2008–09 Russian Cup was the seventeenth season of the Russian football knockout tournament since the dissolution of Soviet Union. The competition started on 16 April 2008 and finished with the final held on 31 May 2009. The defending champions were CSKA Moscow.

== Preliminary round ==
This round featured 20 Second Division teams and 2 amateur teams. The games were played between 16 and 27 April 2008.

=== Section West ===
Team 1	Score	Team 2
Pskov-747 Pskov (III)	1–1 (a.e.t.) (3–5 p)	Sever Murmansk (III)
Volga Tver (III)	2–0	FC Dmitrov (III)
FC Istra (III)	1–3	FC Zelenograd (III)
MVD Rossii Moscow (III)	2–0	Avangard Podolsk (IV)
FC Rybinsk (IV)	0–4	Dynamo Vologda (III)

=== Section Center ===
Team 1	Score	Team 2
Zvezda Serpukhov (III)	4–0	Nika Moscow (III)
Saturn-2 Moscow Oblast (III)	1–1 (a.e.t.) (4–3 p)	Znamya Truda Orekhovo-Zuyevo (III)

=== Section South ===
Team 1	Score	Team 2
Zhemchuzhina Sochi (III)	0–1	FC Krasnodar (III)
Volgar-Gazprom Astrakhan (III)	1–0	Dagdizel Kaspiysk (III)

=== Section Ural-Povolzhye ===
Team 1	Score	Team 2
Khimik Dzerzhinsk (III)	1–0	Energetik Uren (III)
Rubin-2 Kazan (III)	3–1	FC Nizhny Novgorod (III)

Note: Roman numerals in brackets denote the league tier the clubs participate in during the 2008 season.

== First round ==
In this round entered 11 winners from the previous round as well as 57 other Second Division teams, what made every team competing in this round Second Division one. The matches were played between 29 April and 18 May 2008.

=== Section West ===
Team 1	Score	Team 2
Sever Murmansk	1–2 (a.e.t.)	Dynamo Saint Petersburg
Volochanin-Ratmir Vyshny Volochyok	2–1	Zenit-2 Saint Petersburg
FC Zelenograd	1–1 (a.e.t.) (3–4 p)	Volga Tver
Nara-ShBFR Naro-Fominsk	0–3	MVD Rossii Moscow
Spartak Shchyolkovo	3–1	FC Reutov
Torpedo Vladimir	3–1	Torpedo-RG Moscow
Dynamo Vologda	1–1 (a.e.t.) (3–4 p)	Sheksna Cherepovets
Spartak Kostroma	2–0	Tekstilshchik Ivanovo

=== Section Center ===
Team 1	Score	Team 2
FC Lukhovitsy	2–1	Zvezda Serpukhov
FC Ryazan	1–2 (a.e.t.)	Saturn-2 Moscow Oblast
Zenit Penza	0–1 (a.e.t.)	Mordovia Saransk
Spartak Tambov	1–2	Metallurg Lipetsk
Avangard Kursk	1–0 (a.e.t.)	Rusichi Oryol
FC Yelets	1–1 (a.e.t.) (7–8 p)	FC Gubkin
FCS-73 Voronez	1–1 (a.e.t.) (7–8 p)	Dynamo Voronezh
Zodiak Stary Oskol	0–2	Lokomotiv Liski

=== Section South ===
Team 1	Score	Team 2
FC Krasnodar	2–0	Sochi-04
Energiya Volzhsky	2–3	Olimpia Volgograd
Krasnodar-2000	1–0	Spartak-UGP Anapa
Druzhba Maykop	2–3	FC Taganrog
FC Bataysk-2007	2–0	Nika Krasny Sulin
Rotor Volgograd	1–0	Kavkaztransgaz-2005 Ryzdvyany
Avtodor Vladikavkaz	1–0	Dynamo Stavropol
FC Astrakhan	1–1 (a.e.t.) (5–6 p)	Volgar-Gazprom Astrakhan

=== Section Ural-Povolzhye ===
Team 1	Score	Team 2
Volga Nizhny Novgorod	3–1	Rubin-2 Kazan
Dynamo Kirov	2–0	Khimik Dzerzinsk
Sokol-Saratov	0–1	FC Togliatti
Lada Togliatti	2–0	Yunit Samara
Alnas Almetyevsk	0–0 (a.e.t.) (4–2 p)	Academia Dimitrovgrad
SOYUZ-Gazprom Izhevsk	1–1 (a.e.t.) (6–5 p)	Neftekhimik Nizhnekamsk
Gazovik Orenburg	3–0	Gornyak Uchaly
FC Tyumen	1–4	Zenit Chelyabinsk

=== Section East ===
Team 1	Score	Team 2
Sibir-2 Novosibirsk	1–0	KUZBASS Kemerovo
Sakhalin Yuzhno-Sakhalinsk	0–0 (a.e.t.) (5–4 p)	Okean Nakhodka

== Second round ==
In this round entered 34 winners from the First Round and the 6 remaining Second Division teams. The matches were played between 21 and 29 May 2008.

=== Section West ===
Team 1	Score	Team 2
Dynamo Saint Petersburg	1–2 (a.e.t.)	Volochanin-Ratmir Vyshny Volochyok
MVD Rossii Moscow	0–1 (a.e.t.)	Volga Tver
Spartak Shchyolkovo	0–2	Torpedo Vladimir
Sheksna Cherepovets	0–3	Spartak Kostroma

=== Section Center ===
Team 1	Score	Team 2
Saturn-2 Moscow Oblast	0–3	FC Lukhovitsy
Mordovia Saransk	0–3	Metallurg Lipetsk
FC Gubkin	1–2	Avangard Kursk
Dynamo Voronezh	1–0	Lokomotiv Liski

=== Section South ===
Team 1	Score	Team 2
FC Krasnodar	3–1	FC Krasnodar-2000
FC Taganrog	4–2	FC Bataysk-2007
Olimpia Volgograd	0–1	Volgar-Gazprom Astrakhan
Rotor Volgograd	3–2 (a.e.t.)	Avtodor Vladikavkaz

=== Section Ural-Povolzhye ===
Team 1	Score	Team 2
Volga Nizhny Novgorod	3–1	Dynamo Kirov
FC Togliatti	1–1 (a.e.t.) (2–3 p)	Lada Togliatti
Alnas Almetyevsk	2–1	SOYUZ-Gazprom Izhevsk
Zenit Chelyabinsk	0–1	Gazovik Orenburg

=== Section East ===
Team 1	Score	Team 2
Irtysh-1946 Omsk	0–3	Sibir-2 Novosibirsk
Metallurg Krasnoyarsk	1–0	Sibiryak Bratsk
FC Chita	1–1 (a.e.t.) (2–4 p)	Amur Blagoveshchensk
Smena Komsomolsk-na-Amure	4–1	Sakhalin Yuzhno-Sakhalinsk

== Third round ==
The winners from the previous round entered this round. The matches were played between 7 and 13 June 2008.

=== Section West ===
Team 1	Score	Team 2
Spartak Kostroma	0–1	Torpedo Vladimir
Volga Tver	2–1 (a.e.t.)	Volochanin-Ratmir Vyshny Volochyok

=== Section Center ===
Team 1	Score	Team 2
Metallurg Lipetsk	2–0	FC Lukhovitsy
Dynamo Voronezh	0–2	Avangard Kursk

=== Section South ===
Team 1	Score	Team 2
FC Taganrog	4–1	FC Krasnodar
Volgar-Gazprom Astrakhan	2–1 (a.e.t.)	Rotor Volgograd

=== Section Ural-Povolzhye ===
Team 1	Score	Team 2
Lada Togliatti	1–5	Volga Nizhny Novgorod
Gazovik Orenburg	3–0	Alnas Almetyevsk

=== Section East ===
Team 1	Score	Team 2
Sibir-2 Novosibirsk	1–2 (a.e.t.)	Metallurg Krasnoyarsk
Amur Blagoveshchensk	0–1	Smena Komsomolsk-na-Amure

== Fourth round ==
In this round entered winners from the previous round as well as 22 First Division teams. The matches were played on 30 June and 1 July 2008.

Team 1	Score	Team 2
Metallurg Krasnoyarsk (III)	2–3	Smena Komsomolsk-na-Amure (III)
Torpedo Vladimir (III)	4–0	Torpedo Moscow (II)
Volga Tver (III)	1–3	Baltika Kaliningrad (II)
Metallurg Lipetsk (III)	3–0	Volga Ulyanovsk (II)
Vityaz Podolsk (II)	3–1	Sportakademklub Moscow (II)
Avangard Kursk (III)	0–1	Dynamo Bryansk (II)
Salyut-Energia Belgorod (II)	3–0	FC Rostov (II)
Chernomorets Novorossiysk (II)	0–1 (a.e.t.)	Kuban Krasnodar (II)
FC Taganrog (III)	0–3	SKA Rostov-on-Don (II)
Volgar-Gazprom Astrakhan (III)	2–3	Alania Vladikavkaz (II)
Anzhi Makhachkala (II)	3–0	Mashuk-KMV Pyatigorsk (II)
Volga Nizhny Novgorod (III)	0–0 (a.e.t.) (5–4 p)	Nosta Novotroitsk (II)
KAMAZ Naberezhnye Chelny (II)	2–1	Ural Sverdlovsk Oblast (II)
Sibir Novosibirsk (II)	4–1	Dynamo Barnaul (II)
Gazovik Orenburg (III)	1–0	Metallurg-Kuzbass Novokuznetsk (II)
SKA-Energia Khabarovsk (II)	4–0	Zvezda Irkutsk (II)

Note: Roman numerals in brackets denote the league tier the clubs participated in during the 2008 season.

== Fifth round ==
All 16 Premier League teams entered the competition in this round together with 16 winners from the previous round. The matches were played on 5 and 6 August 2008.

Team 1	Score	Team 2
Smena Komsomolsk-na-Amure (III)	1–1 (a.e.t.) (3–5 p)	Rubin Kazan
Torpedo Vladimir (III)	1–4	CSKA Moscow
Baltika Kaliningrad (II)	3–0	Luch-Energiya Vladivostok
Metallurg Lipetsk (III)	0–2	Lokomotiv Moscow
Vityaz Podolsk (II)	2–1	Spartak Nalchik
Dynamo Bryansk (II)	1–2	Spartak Moscow
Salyut-Energia Belgorod (II)	0–1	Shinnik Yaroslavl
Kuban Krasnodar (II)	0–1	Dynamo Moscow
SKA Rostov-on-Don (II)	3–2 (a.e.t.)	FC Khimki
Alania Vladikavkaz (II)	1–3	FC Moscow
Anzhi Makhachkala (II)	2–3	Terek Grozny
Volga Nizhny Novgorod (III)	1–1 (a.e.t.) (4–3 p)	Saturn Moscow Oblast
KAMAZ Naberezhnye Chelny (II)	1–5	Tom Tomsk
Sibir Novosibirsk (II)	1–0	Zenit Saint Petersburg
Gazovik Orenburg (III)	2–2 (a.e.t.) (3–5 p)	Krylia Sovetov Samara
SKA-Energia Khabarovsk (II)	1–1 (a.e.t.) (1–4 p)	Amkar Perm

Note: Roman numerals in brackets denote the league tier the clubs participated in during the 2008 season.

== Sixth round ==
The winners from the previous round entered the Sixth Round. The matches were played on 23 and 24 September 2008.

23 September 2008	Dynamo Moscow	2–0	SKA Rostov-on-Don (II)	Moscow
19:00	Kowalczyk 11'; Kerzhakov 80'			Stadium: Dynamo; Attendance: 5,500; Referee: Ildus Biglov (Ufa)

24 September 2008	Tom Tomsk	2–2 (a.e.t.) (4–1 p)	Volga Nizhny Novgorod (III)	Tomsk
15:00	Tarasov 13'; Kornilenko 23'		Malakhov 45'; Aydov 75' (pen.)	Stadium: Trud; Attendance: 9,000; Referee: Sergei Matsyura (Komsomolsk-on-Amur)
	Penalties
	Klimov (penalty scored); Kharitonov (penalty scored); Jokić (penalty scored); Radosavljević (penalty scored)		(penalty missed) Aydov; (penalty missed) Vasilyev; (penalty scored) Malakhov

24 September 2008	FC Moscow	3–0	Terek Grozny	Moscow
18:00	Kuzmin 27' (pen.), 84' (pen.); Česnauskis 49'			Stadium: Eduard Streltsov Stadium; Attendance: 683; Referee: Vladimir Kazmenko (Rostov-on-Don)

24 September 2008	Lokomotiv Moscow	1–0	Vityaz Podolsk (II)	Moscow
18:00	Traoré 59'			Stadium: Lokomotiv; Attendance: 7,800; Referee: Aleksei Sergeyev (Moscow)

24 September 2008	Krylia Sovetov Samara	0–2	Sibir Novosibirsk (II)	Samara
18:00			Gorbanets 58'; Medvedev 80'	Stadium: Metallurg; Attendance: 10,000; Referee: Sergei Karasev (Moscow)

24 September 2008	Shinnik Yaroslavl	1–2	Spartak Moscow	Shinnik, Yaroslavl
18:30	Kudryashov 57'		Ryzhkov 45'; Prudnikov 49'	Attendance: 11,200; Referee: Yuri Klyuchnikov (Rostov-on-Don)

24 September 2008	Rubin Kazan	0–0 (a.e.t.) (4–1 p)	Amkar Perm	Kazan
19:00				Stadium: Central; Attendance: 8,500; Referee: Vyacheslav Kharlamov (Moscow)
	Penalties
	Milošević (penalty scored); Ansaldi (penalty scored); Adamov (penalty scored); Kobenko (penalty scored)		(penalty missed) Sirakov; (penalty missed) Drinčić; (penalty scored) Cherenchikov

24 September 2008	CSKA Moscow	1–0	Baltika Kaliningrad (II)	Moscow
19:00	Dzagoev 90' (pen.)			Stadium: Luzhniki; Attendance: 3,500; Referee: Aleksei Kovalev (Tambov)

Note: Roman numerals in brackets denote the league tier the clubs participated in during the 2008 season.

== Quarter-finals ==
The matches were played on 15 and 22 April 2009.

15 April 2009	Rubin Kazan	2–0	Sibir Novosibirsk (II)	Kazan
19:00	Adamov 33'; Gorbanets 86'			Stadium: Central; Attendance: 6,500; Referee: Vyacheslav Popov (Degtyarsk)

15 April 2009	Spartak Moscow	0–3	Dynamo Moscow	Moscow
20:00			Kerzhakov 63'; Khokhlov 77'; Smolov 89'	Stadium: Luzhniki; Attendance: 23,000; Referee: Aleksandr Kolobaev (Moscow)

22 April 2009	Lokomotiv Moscow	0–1	CSKA Moscow	Moscow
19:00			Necid 57'	Stadium: Lokomotiv; Attendance: 15,840; Referee: Maksim Layushkin (Moscow)

22 April 2009	FC Moscow	2–1	Tom Tomsk	Moscow
20:00	Epureanu 63'; Bracamonte 75'		Michkov 58'	Stadium: Eduard Streltsov Stadium; Attendance: 2,000; Referee: Igor Egorov (Nizhny Novgorod)

Note: Roman numerals in brackets denote the league tier the clubs participated in during the 2009 season.

== Semi-finals ==
The matches were played on 6 and 13 May 2009.

6 May 2009	FC Moscow	0–1	Rubin Kazan	Moscow
18:30			Ryazantsev 49'	Stadium: Eduard Streltsov Stadium; Attendance: 6,000; Referee: Nikolai Ivanov (Saint Petersburg)

13 May 2009	Dynamo Moscow	2–2 (a.e.t.) (5–6 p)	CSKA Moscow	Khimki
19:30	Khokhlov 86'; Kerzhakov 90+3' (pen.)		Vágner Love 40' (pen.); Zhirkov 53'	Stadium: Arena Khimki; Attendance: 6,068; Referee: Almir Kayumov (Moscow)
	Penalties
	Kerzhakov (penalty scored); D.Kombarov (penalty scored); Kolodin (penalty scored); Wilkshire (penalty scored); Khokhlov (penalty missed); Smolov (penalty scored); Dimidko (penalty missed); Kokorin (penalty missed)		(penalty scored) Daniel Carvalho; (penalty scored) Vágner Love; (penalty scored) Zhirkov; (penalty scored) Ignashevich; (penalty missed) Necid; (penalty scored) Schennikov; (penalty missed) Aldonin; (penalty scored) V.Berezutskiy

== Final ==
The final was played on 31 May 2009.

31 May 2009
14:00

Rubin Kazan	0–1	CSKA Moscow
	Report	Aldonin 90+1'

Arena Khimki, Khimki
Attendance: 13,000
Referee: Stanislav Sukhina (Malakhovka)

Rubin Kazan	CSKA

FC Rubin Kazan:
GK	77	(Russia) Sergey Ryzhikov
DF	3	(Argentina) Cristian Ansaldi
DF	4	(Spain) César Navas	(yellow card) 82'
DF	76	(Russia) Roman Sharonov (c)	(yellow card) 86'
MF	6	(South Africa) MacBeth Sibaya
MF	15	(Russia) Aleksandr Ryazantsev	(yellow card) 22' (substituted off) 77'
MF	16	(Ecuador) Christian Noboa	(yellow card) 36'
MF	23	(Russia) Yevgeni Balyaikin	(yellow card) 59'
MF	61	(Turkey) Gökdeniz Karadeniz	(yellow card) 78'
FW	10	(Argentina) Alejandro Damián Domínguez
FW	99	(Turkey) Hasan Kabze	(substituted off) 86'
Substitutes:
GK	1	(Russia) Sergei Kozko
DF	2	(Croatia) Stjepan Tomas
DF	22	(Russia) Aleksandr Orekhov
MF	5	(Russia) Pyotr Bystrov	(substituted on) 86'
MF	14	(Ukraine) Serhii Rebrov
FW	11	(Russia) Aleksandr Bukharov	(substituted on) 77'
FW	21	(Russia) Roman Adamov
Manager:
(Turkmenistan) Kurban Berdyev Assistant referees: Oleg Tselovalnikov (Astrakhan); Sergei Panteleyev (Tula)

PFC CSKA Moscow:
GK	35	(Russia) Igor Akinfeev (c)
DF	2	(Lithuania) Deividas Šemberas
DF	4	(Russia) Sergei Ignashevich
DF	24	(Russia) Vasili Berezutski
DF	42	(Russia) Georgi Schennikov
MF	11	(Russia) Pavel Mamayev	(red card) 13'
MF	18	(Russia) Yuri Zhirkov	(yellow card) 90'
MF	22	(Russia) Evgeni Aldonin	(yellow card) 56'
FW	7	(Brazil) Daniel Carvalho	(substituted off) 90'
FW	9	(Brazil) Vágner Love
FW	12	(Niger) Ouwo Moussa Maazou	(substituted off) 72'
Substitutes:
GK	33	(Russia) Yevgeny Pomazan
DF	6	(Russia) Aleksei Berezutski	(substituted on) 90'
DF	15	(Nigeria) Chidi Odiah
MF	10	(Russia) Alan Dzagoev
MF	17	(Serbia) Miloš Krasić	(substituted on) 72'
MF	88	(Turkey) Caner Erkin
FW	89	(Czech Republic) Tomáš Necid
Manager:
(Brazil) Zico

Played in the earlier stages, but were not on the final game squad:

FC Rubin Kazan: (Brazil) Gabriel (DF), (Brazil) Jefthon (DF), Vitali Kaleshin (DF), (Georgia (country)) Dato Kvirkvelia (DF), Igor Klimov (DF), Mikhail Mischenko (DF), Aleksei Popov (DF), (Georgia (country)) Lasha Salukvadze (DF), (Uzbekistan) Andrei Fyodorov (DF), (Uzbekistan) Vadim Afonin (MF), (Uzbekistan) Vagiz Galiullin (MF), Andrei Gorbanets (MF), Andrei Kobenko (MF), Aleksei Kotlyarov (MF), Sergei Semak (MF), Ildar Bikchantayev (FW), (Serbia) Savo Milošević (FW), (Uzbekistan) Davron Mirzayev (FW), Ruslan Nagayev (FW), Igor Portnyagin (FW).

PFC CSKA Moscow: Anton Grigoryev (DF), (Czech Republic) Luboš Kalouda (MF), (Bosnia and Herzegovina) Elvir Rahimić (MF), (Brazil) Ricardo Jesus (FW), Dmitri Ryzhov (FW), (Poland) Dawid Janczyk (FW).
