= Yevgeni Malakhov =

Russian footballer

Personal information
- Full name: Yevgeni Borisovich Malakhov
- Date of birth: 17 November 1982 (age 43)
- Height: 1.78 m (5 ft 10 in)
- Position: Midfielder

Senior career*
Years	Team	Apps	(Gls)
2002–2004	FC Uralan Elista	11	(0)
2005	FC Metallurg-Kuzbass Novokuznetsk	13	(0)
2005	FC Lada Togliatti	7	(0)
2006	FC Elista	16	(1)
2006–2010	FC Volga Nizhny Novgorod	68	(2)
2010	→ FC Metallurg-Oskol Stary Oskol (loan)	17	(5)
2011–2013	FC Metallurg-Oskol Stary Oskol	73	(7)
- * Club domestic league appearances and goals

Yevgeni Borisovich Malakhov (Russian: Евгений Борисович Малахов; born 17 November 1982) is a former Russian professional footballer.

== Club career ==
After playing in the reserves, he made his debut in the Russian Premier League in 2002 for FC Uralan Elista.
