= Tomáš Necid =

Czech footballer (born 1989)

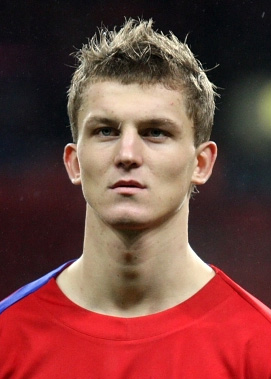
- Necid in 2009

Personal information
- Date of birth: 13 August 1989 (age 37)
- Place of birth: Prague, Czechoslovakia
- Height: 1.90 m (6 ft 3 in)
- Position: Striker

Team information
- Current team: Slavia Prague B
- Number: 9

Youth career
- 1994–1998: TJ Sokol Stodůlky
- 1998–2007: Slavia Prague

Senior career*
Years	Team	Apps	(Gls)
2006–2009	Slavia Prague	32	(13)
2008	→ Jablonec (loan)	13	(5)
2009–2015	CSKA Moscow	75	(19)
2013–2014	→ PAOK (loan)	12	(1)
2014	→ Slavia Prague (loan)	13	(3)
2014	→ PEC Zwolle (loan)	14	(8)
2015	PEC Zwolle	10	(3)
2015–2018	Bursaspor	36	(11)
2017	→ Legia Warsaw (loan)	6	(1)
2017–2018	→ Slavia Prague (loan)	15	(3)
2018–2020	ADO Den Haag	47	(15)
2020–2024	Bohemians 1905	61	(7)
2024–2025	Viktoria Žižkov	22	(17)
2025–	Slavia Prague B	36	(11)

International career
2004–2005	Czech Republic U16	8	(7)
2005–2006	Czech Republic U17	18	(11)
2006–2008	Czech Republic U19	20	(14)
2008	Czech Republic U21	1	(0)
2008–2016	Czech Republic	44	(12)
Medal record
Men's football
Representing Czech Republic
UEFA European Under-17 Championship
Runner-up	2006 Luxembourg
- * Club domestic league appearances and goals as of 14 September 2026

Tomáš Necid (Czech pronunciation: [ˈtomaːʃ ˈnɛtsɪt]; born 13 August 1989) is a Czech professional footballer who plays as a striker for Slavia Prague B.

== Club career ==
=== Early years ===
At the end of the 2007–08 season, in his first match for Slavia after his return from Jablonec, Necid scored a goal against Liberec. Slavia Prague won the 2007–08 Czech First League. In 2008, he won the Talent of the Year award at the Czech Footballer of the Year awards. Necid played 16 games in the 2008–09 Czech First League and scored 11 goals (which was making him the season's top league scorer at the time he left).

=== CSKA Moscow and loan to Slavia Prague ===
In August 2008, CSKA Moscow, who had been interested in Necid since 2006, signed a deal with Slavia Prague according to which Necid would stay at Slavia until the end of the year and would join CSKA in January 2009.

On 6 January 2014, Necid moved to Slavia Prague on loan until the end of 2013–14 season. In August 2014, he was sent on loan to Dutch Eredivisie team PEC Zwolle.

=== Netherlands and Turkey ===
In 2015, Necid returned to PEC Zwolle as a free agent with a contract until the end of the 2014–15 season. On 2 July 2015, Necid signed a four-year contract for Turkish Süper Lig club Bursaspor. He came to the club for a key role in filling the shoes of top goalscorer from 2014–15 season, Fernandão.

On 30 January 2017, Necid moved to Legia Warsaw on loan for one-and-a-half year. On 1 September 2017, he rejoined Slavia Prague on a season-long loan deal. He left Slavia after the loan ended.

=== Later career ===
On 28 August 2018, Necid joined Dutch team ADO Den Haag on a two-year contract after his Bursaspor contract was terminated. On 12 October 2020, Necid joined Bohemians 1905 as a free agent and signed a contract until the end of the season.

In June 2024, Necid joined Czech National Football League club Viktoria Žižkov as a free agent. He scored 13 goals in 16 games before the mid-season break of the 2024–25 season, playing five further matches before being named the second league's Player of the Season on 21 May 2025. Necid also finished the season as the league's top goalscorer with 17 goals.

== International career ==
=== Youth sides ===
Necid took part in the 2006 UEFA European Under-17 Football Championship, where the Czech Republic won a silver medal, as well as the 2008 UEFA European Under-19 Football Championship, where his nation reached the semi-final. In both tournaments he finished as the top scorer. He scored 7 goals in 8 matches for the under-16 side, and 11 goals in 18 matches for the under-17s. As well as representing the under-19s, where Necid scored 14 times in 20 appearances, he made a single appearance, without scoring, for the under-21 side.

=== Senior side ===
His first match with the senior team took place on 19 November 2008, in a qualification match against San Marino. The Czech national football team won 3–0, with Necid scoring the third goal. In the game he became the youngest Czech Republic player to take part in qualification for a major tournament, and the youngest Czech to score a competitive goal. He added another two goals - in a 7–0 win against San Marino, as well as a 2–0 victory against Poland - to finish World Cup qualification with three overall.

== Personal life ==
He is the older brother of Simona Necidová, who is also an international footballer.

== Career statistics ==
=== Club ===
As of 27 September 2020

Appearances and goals by club, season and competition
Club	Season	League			National cup (Note: Includes Czech Cup, Russian Cup, Greek Cup, KNVB Cup, Turkish Cup)		Europe		Other		Total		Ref.
Club	Season	Division	Apps	Goals	Apps	Goals	Apps	Goals	Apps	Goals	Apps	Goals	Ref.
Slavia Prague	2006–07	Czech First League	13	2	0	0	1 (Note: Appearance(s) in UEFA Cup/UEFA Europa League)	0	0	0	14	2	
Slavia Prague	2007–08	Czech First League	3	0	0	0	4 (Note: Appearances in UEFA Champions League)	0	0	0	7	0	
Slavia Prague	2008–09	Czech First League	16	11	2	1	7 (Note: Two appearances in UEFA Champions League, five appearances in UEFA Cup)	0	0	0	25	12	
Slavia Prague	Total		32	13	2	1	12	0	0	0	46	14	–
FK Jablonec (loan)	2007–08	Czech First League	13	5	0	0	0	0	0	0	13	5	
CSKA Moscow	2009	Russian Premier League	27	9	4	2	6	1	0	0	37	12	
CSKA Moscow	2010	Russian Premier League	24	7	2	0	11 (Note: Five appearances and one goal in UEFA Champions League, six appearances and five goals in UEFA Europa League)	6	0	0	37	13	
CSKA Moscow	2011–12	Russian Premier League	23	3	5	1	6 (Note: Two appearances in UEFA Champions League, four appearances and one goal in UEFA Europa League)	1	0	0	34	5	
CSKA Moscow	2012–13	Russian Premier League	1	0	0	0	0	0	0	0	1	0	
CSKA Moscow	Total		75	19	11	3	23	8	0	0	109	30	–
PAOK (loan)	2013–14	Super League Greece	12	1	2	1	5 (Note: Three appearances and one goal in UEFA Champions League, two appearances in UEFA Europa League)	1	0	0	19	3	
Slavia Prague (loan)	2013–14	Czech First League	13	3	2	0	0	0	0	0	15	3	
PEC Zwolle (loan)	2014–15	Eredivisie	24	11	5	2	2	0	2	1	33	14	
Bursaspor	2015–16	Süper Lig	28	11	5	5	0	0	0	0	33	16	
Bursaspor	2016–17	Süper Lig	6	0	6	2	0	0	0	0	12	2	
Bursaspor	2018–19	Süper Lig	2	0	0	0	0	0	0	0	2	0	
Bursaspor	Total		36	11	11	7	0	0	0	0	47	18	–
Legia Warsaw (loan)	2016–17	Ekstraklasa	6	1	0	0	2	0	—		8	1	
Slavia Prague (loan)	2017–18	Czech First League	15	3	4	3	6	2	0	0	25	8	
ADO Den Haag	2018–19	Eredivisie	26	9	2	2	0	0	0	0	28	11	
ADO Den Haag	2019–20	Eredivisie	21	6	1	0	0	0	0	0	22	6	
ADO Den Haag	Total		47	15	3	2	0	0	0	0	50	17	–
Career total			273	82	40	19	50	11	2	1	365	113	–

=== International ===
As of 7 June 2019

Appearances and goals by national team and year
National team	Year	Apps	Goals
Czech Republic	2008	1	1
Czech Republic	2009	11	3
Czech Republic	2010	8	3
Czech Republic	2011	5	0
Czech Republic	2012	1	0
Czech Republic	2013	0	0
Czech Republic	2014	2	1
Czech Republic	2015	6	1
Czech Republic	2016	10	3
Total		44	12

As of match played 7 June 2019
Scores and results list Czech Republic's goal tally first, score column indicates score after each Necid goal.

List of international goals scored by Tomáš Necid
No.	Date	Venue	Cap	Opponent	Score	Result	Competition
1	19 November 2008	San Marino Stadium, Serravalle, San Marino	1	San Marino	3–0	3–0	2010 FIFA World Cup qualification
2	5 June 2009	Na Stínadlech, Teplice, Czech Republic	5	Malta	1–0	1–0	Friendly
3	9 September 2009	Městský fotbalový stadion Miroslava Valenty, Uherské Hradiště, Czech Republic	8	San Marino	6–0	7–0	2010 FIFA World Cup qualification
4	10 October 2009	Generali Arena, Prague, Czech Republic	9	Poland	1–0	2–0	2010 FIFA World Cup qualification
5	25 May 2010	Pratt & Whitney Stadium at Rentschler Field, East Hartford, United States	15	United States	4–2	4–2	Friendly
6	11 August 2010	Stadion u Nisy, Liberec, Czech Republic	16	Latvia	4–0	4–1	Friendly
7	12 October 2010	Rheinpark Stadion, Vaduz, Liechtenstein	19	Liechtenstein	1–0	2–0	UEFA Euro 2012 qualifying
8	13 October 2014	Astana Arena, Astana, Kazakhstan	27	Kazakhstan	4–1	4–2	UEFA Euro 2016 qualifying
9	13 November 2015	Městský fotbalový stadion Miroslava Valenty, Uherské Hradiště, Czech Republic	33	Serbia	2–1	4–1	Friendly
10	27 May 2016	Kufstein-Arena, Kufstein, Austria	37	Malta	5–0	6–0	Friendly
11	1 June 2016	Tivoli-Neu, Innsbruck, Austria	38	Russia	2–1	2–1	Friendly
12	17 June 2016	Stade Geoffroy-Guichard, Saint-Étienne, France	41	Croatia	2–2	2–2	UEFA Euro 2016

== Honours ==
Slavia Prague

- Czech League: 2007–08, 2008–09
- Czech Cup: 2017–18

CSKA Moscow

- Russian Premier League: 2012–13
- Russian Cup: 2008–09, 2010–11
- Russian Super Cup: 2009, 2013

Legia Warsaw

- Ekstraklasa: 2016–17

Czech Republic U17

- UEFA European Under-17 Championship runner-up: 2006

Individual

- UEFA European Under-17 Football Championship top scorer: 2006
- UEFA European Under-19 Football Championship top scorer: 2008
- Czech Footballer of the Year: 2008 (Talent of the Year)
