= Maksim Vasilyev (footballer, born 1987) =

Russian footballer

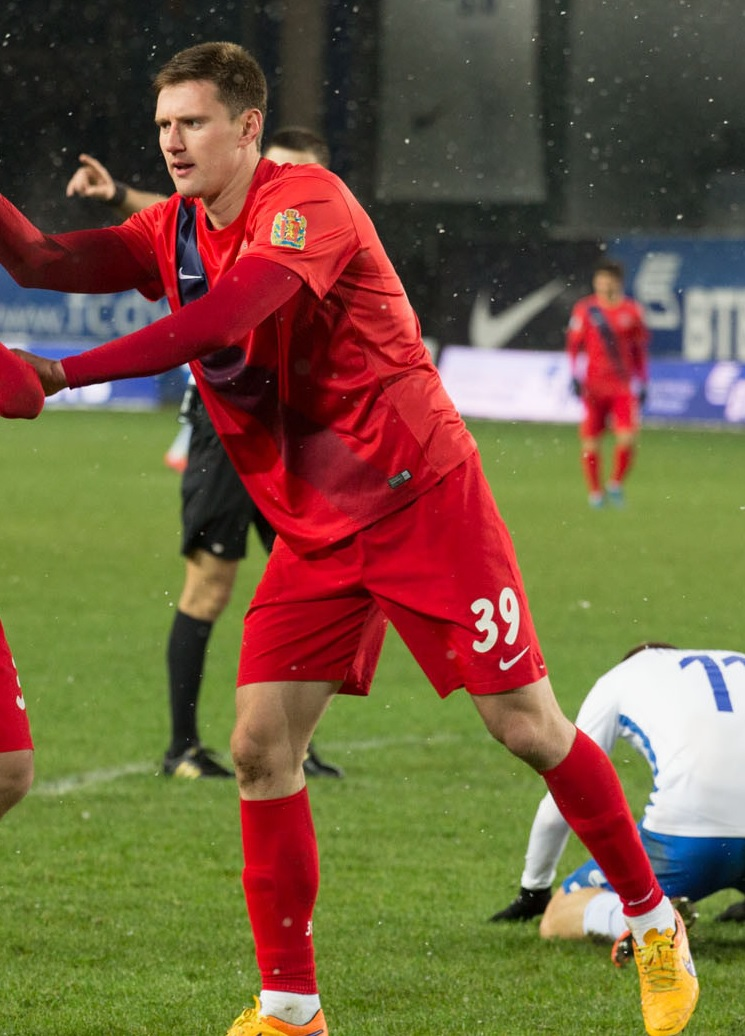
- Vasilyev with Yenisey Krasnoyarsk in 2016

Personal information
- Full name: Maksim Vladimirovich Vasilyev
- Date of birth: 31 January 1987 (age 39)
- Place of birth: Leningrad, Soviet Union
- Height: 1.96 m (6 ft 5 in)
- Position: Defender

Youth career
- Zenit Saint Petersburg

Senior career*
Years	Team	Apps	(Gls)
2006	Burevestnik-YuRGUES Shakhty		
2007–2008	Volga Nizhny Novgorod	16	(0)
2009	Torpedo Zhodino	9	(1)
2010–2012	Jaro	80	(5)
2013–2015	Baltika Kaliningrad	76	(3)
2015–2018	Yenisey Krasnoyarsk	74	(1)
2018–2019	Rotor Volgograd	27	(0)
2019–2020	Armavir	11	(0)
2020–2021	Dynamo Bryansk	52	(4)
- * Club domestic league appearances and goals

Maksim Vladimirovich Vasilyev (Russian: Максим Владимирович Васильев; born 31 January 1987) is a Russian former professional footballer who played as a centre back.

== Club career ==
He made his Russian Football National League debut for Baltika Kaliningrad on 12 March 2013 in a game against FC Khimki.
