= Eduardo Lobos =

Chilean footballer and manager (born 1981)

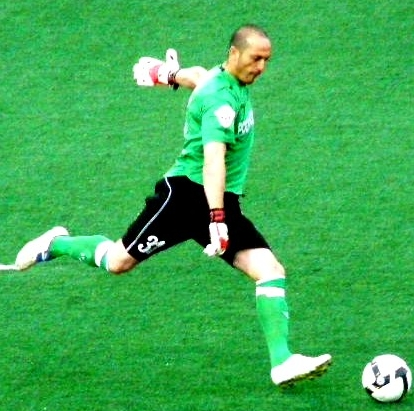
- Lobos with Krylia Sovetov in 2008

Personal information
- Full name: Eduardo Eugenio Lobos Landaeta
- Date of birth: 30 July 1981 (age 45)
- Place of birth: Curicó, Chile
- Height: 1.85 m (6 ft 1 in)
- Position: Goalkeeper

Youth career
- 1993–2000: Colo-Colo

Senior career*
Years	Team	Apps	(Gls)
1999	Colo-Colo Juniors	–	(–)
2000–2003	Colo-Colo	50	(0)
2004	Audax Italiano	19	(0)
2005–2010	Krylia Sovetov	129	(0)
2011	Unión Española	17	(0)
2011–2014	Colo-Colo	19	(0)
2011	→ Santiago Wanderers (loan)	12	(0)
2012	→ Unión Española (loan)	41	(1)
2015	San Marcos	6	(0)
2015–2016	Cobresal	19	(0)
2016–2019	Everton	53	(0)
2018	→ Coquimbo Unido (loan)	0	(0)
Total		365	(1)

International career
1999	Chile U20	8	(1)
2002–2008	Chile	2	(0)

Managerial career
- 2020–2021: Iberia
- 2022: San Antonio Unido
- 2023–2024: Deportes Linares
- 2026–: Santiago United Academy
- * Club domestic league appearances and goals

Eduardo Eugenio Lobos Landaeta (Spanish pronunciation: [eˈðwaɾðo ˈloβos], born 30 July 1981) is a Chilean football manager and former footballer who played as a goalkeeper.

== Managerial career ==
In 2020, he began his managerial career as the manager of Deportes Iberia in the Segunda División Profesional de Chile. In 2022, he moved to San Antonio Unido at the same division.

Lobos has served as a football coach for Santiago United Academy, a football academy founded by Esteban Paredes focused in American and Chilean players.

== Honours ==
=== Club ===
Colo-Colo

- Primera División de Chile (1): 2002 Apertura

Coquimbo Unido

- Primera B de Chile (1): 2018
