= Georgi Shchennikov =

Russian footballer (born 1991)

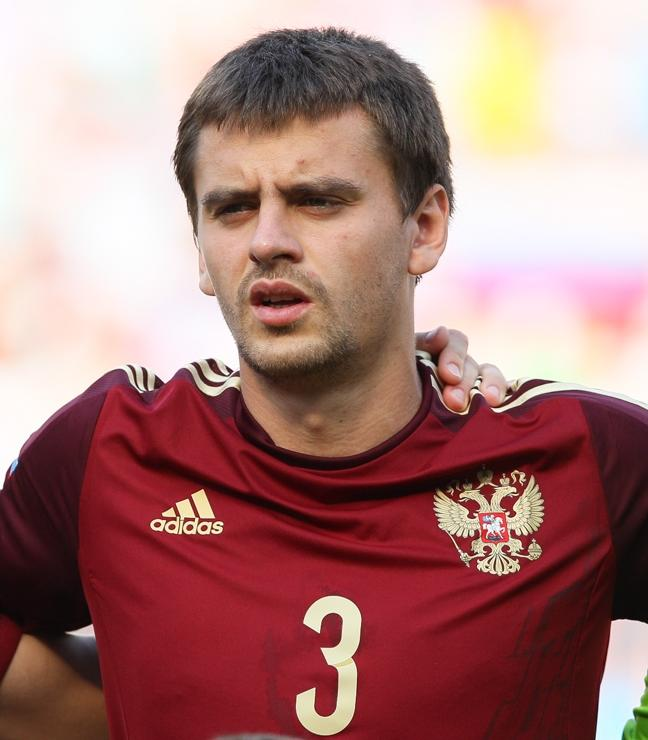
- Shchennikov with Russia in 2014

Personal information
- Full name: Georgi Mikhailovich Shchennikov
- Date of birth: 27 April 1991 (age 35)
- Place of birth: Moscow, Russian SFSR, Soviet Union
- Height: 1.78 m (5 ft 10 in)
- Positions: Midfielder; left-back

Senior career*
Years	Team	Apps	(Gls)
2008–2023	CSKA Moscow	260	(6)

International career
2010	Russia U-19	3	(0)
2009–2013	Russia U-21	23	(1)
2012–2016	Russia	10	(0)
- * Club domestic league appearances and goals

Georgi Mikhaylovich Shchennikov (Russian: Георгий Михайлович Щенников; born 27 April 1991) is a Russian former footballer who played as a left defensive midfielder or left-back. He is a son of the Olympic medalist race walker Mikhail Shchennikov.

== Club career ==
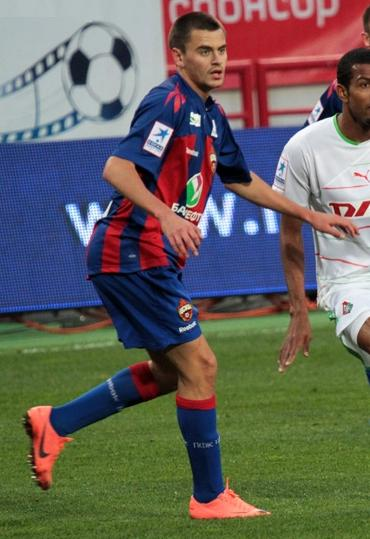
Shchennikov playing for CSKA Moscow in 2012

He made his debut for the main squad in the Russian Cup game against FC Torpedo Vladimir on 6 August 2008. He came on as a substitute on 24 October 2008 in an UEFA Cup game against Deportivo La Coruña, making his debut in European competition before playing in any domestic league games. He was one of the 40 nominees in the 2011 Golden Boy awards, but was not eventually included to the short list.

In 2013 he scored his first goal for the club with an extra time winner against Terek Gronzy.

On 22 November 2017, he scored his first Champions League goal in a 2–0 win over Benfica in the 2017–18 season. On 5 June 2018, Shchennikov signed a new five-year contract with CSKA Moscow. On 12 December 2018, he scored a goal in a 3–0 win over Real Madrid in the Santiago Bernabéu Stadium.

On 3 June 2023, Shchennikov played his farewell game for CSKA after 15 seasons at the club as CSKA secured 2nd place in the 2022–23 Russian Premier League by beating FC Rostov 4–1.

== International career ==
Shchennikov was a part of the Russia under-21 side that competed in the 2011 European Under-21 Championship qualification.

He made his senior national team debut on 15 August 2012 in a friendly against Ivory Coast. On 2 June 2014, he was included in the Russia's 2014 FIFA World Cup squad.

== Career statistics ==
=== Club ===
As of match played end of 2022–23 season

Appearances and goals by club, season and competition
Club	Season	League			Cup		Continental		Other		Total	
Club	Season	Division	Apps	Goals	Apps	Goals	Apps	Goals	Apps	Goals	Apps	Goals
CSKA Moscow	2008	Premier League	0	0	1	0	2	0	1 (Note: Appearance(s) in Russian Super Cup)	0	4	0
CSKA Moscow	2009	Premier League	25	0	4	0	10	0	1	0	40	0
CSKA Moscow	2010	Premier League	25	0	1	0	11	0	1	0	38	0
CSKA Moscow	2011–12	Premier League	21	0	1	0	9	0	1	0	32	0
CSKA Moscow	2012–13	Premier League	18	0	3	0	1	0	–		22	0
CSKA Moscow	2013–14	Premier League	28	0	4	1	6	0	1	0	39	1
CSKA Moscow	2014–15	Premier League	12	0	2	0	5	0	–		19	0
CSKA Moscow	2015–16	Premier League	19	0	1	0	6	0	–		26	0
CSKA Moscow	2016–17	Premier League	25	0	0	0	6	0	1	0	32	0
CSKA Moscow	2017–18	Premier League	19	3	0	0	11	2	–		30	5
CSKA Moscow	2018–19	Premier League	20	1	0	0	3	1	1	0	24	2
CSKA Moscow	2019–20	Premier League	9	2	1	0	1	0	–		11	2
CSKA Moscow	2020–21	Premier League	22	0	3	0	3	0	–		28	0
CSKA Moscow	2021–22	Premier League	14	0	2	0	–		–		16	0
CSKA Moscow	2022–23	Premier League	3	0	3	0	–		–		6	0
Career Total			260	6	26	1	74	3	7	0	367	10

=== International ===
Appearances and goals by national team and year

National team	Year	Apps	Goals
Russia	2012	1	0
Russia	2013	1	0
Russia	2014	4	0
Russia	2015	1	0
Russia	2016	3	0
Total		10	0

== Honours ==
=== Club ===
CSKA Moscow

- Russian Premier League (2): 2012–13, 2013–14
- Russian Cup (4): 2008–09, 2010–11, 2012–13, 2022–23
- Russian Super Cup (3): 2009, 2013, 2018

=== Individual ===
- In the list of 33 best football players of the championship of Russia (3): 2009, 2010, 2013–14
- Russian Premier League Best Young Player (1): 2009
