= Aleksandr Ryazantsev =

Russian footballer (born 1986)

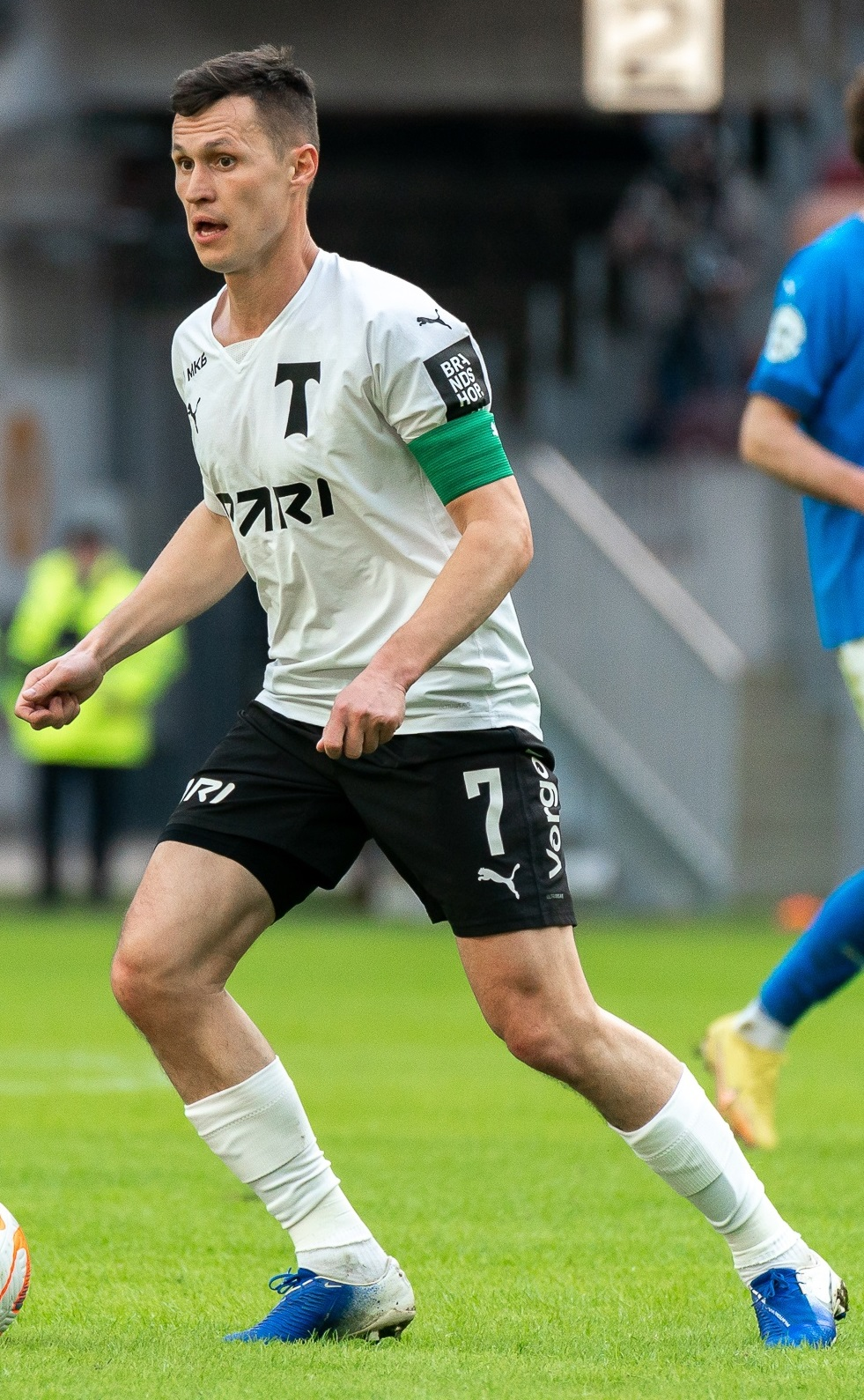
- Ryazantsev with Torpedo Moscow in 2023

Personal information
- Full name: Aleksandr Aleksandrovich Ryazantsev
- Date of birth: 5 September 1986 (age 40)
- Place of birth: Moscow, Soviet Union
- Height: 1.80 m (5 ft 11 in)
- Position: Winger

Team information
- Current team: CSKA Moscow (U19 assistant coach)

Youth career
- –2003: Torpedo-Metallurg Moscow

Senior career*
Years	Team	Apps	(Gls)
2004–2005	Moscow	2	(0)
2006–2013	Rubin Kazan	155	(20)
2014–2018	Zenit Saint Petersburg	38	(1)
2016	→ Ural Sverdlovsk Oblast (loan)	11	(0)
2016–2017	→ Zenit-2 Saint Petersburg	4	(0)
2017–2018	→ Amkar Perm (loan)	19	(3)
2018–2019	Khimki	27	(4)
2019–2023	Torpedo Moscow	98	(8)
Total		354	(36)

International career
2006–2008	Russia U21	8	(0)
2011–2015	Russia	5	(0)

Managerial career
- 2023–2024: Torpedo Moscow (sports coordinator)
- 2024–2026: CSKA Moscow (scout)
- 2026–: CSKA Moscow (U19 assistant)
Medal record
Rubin Kazan
Winner	Russian Football Premier League	2008
Runner-up	Russian Cup	2009
Runner-up	Russian Super Cup	2009
Winner	Russian Football Premier League	2009
Winner	Russian Super Cup	2010
Winner	Russian Cup	2012
Winner	Russian Super Cup	2012
Zenit Saint Petersburg
Runner-up	Russian Football Premier League	2014
Winner	Russian Football Premier League	2015
- * Club domestic league appearances and goals

Aleksandr Aleksandrovich Ryazantsev (Russian: Александр Александрович Рязанцев, born 5 September 1986) is a Russian football coach and a former player who works as an assistant coach with the Under-19 squad of CSKA Moscow.

He scored the first goal for Rubin Kazan on 20 October 2009, a thunderous 30-yard strike in their shock 2–1 away victory at the Camp Nou against Barcelona in a Champions League group stage match. The goal against Barcelona was described as a "heavenly thunderbolt" by many of his teammates and was remembered as one of the goals of the tournament.

== Club career ==
=== Moscow ===
From January 2003 to December 2005, Ryazantsev played for FC Moscow, formerly known as FC Torpedo-Metallurg Moscow, of the Russian Premier League. He made his professional debut on 19 April 2004 in a 2–1 home wins against Krasnodar. He appeared in 2 matches for the team.

=== Rubin Kazan ===
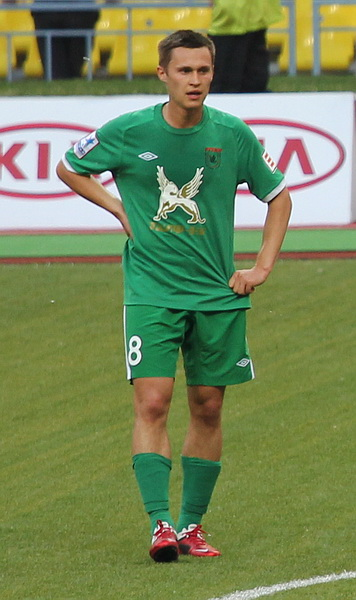
Ryazantsev in Rubin Kazan

Ryazantsev signed for Rubin Kazan before the start of the 2006 Premier League season. His first appearance was as a substitute in a match against Spartak Moscow. He appeared in the starting lineup in the home match against Krasnodar and managed to score a goal. He was also a starter when the team won the 2007 Russian Premier League. In 2008 Russian Premier League Ryazantsev brought his team into champions Rubin Kazan in the Russian Premier League in 2008, he appeared 22 times and scored 1 goal and 3 assists.

2009–10 season

In Match Day Fourth UEFA Champions League 2009 Barcelona vs Rubin Kazan in Nou Camp. Barcelona immediately initiating the attack but Barcelona made ??shock as long-range shot Ryazantsev and now GOAL. He scored the first goal for Rubin Kazan on October 20, 2009, a thunderous 30-yard strike in their shock 2–1 away victory at the Camp Nou against Barcelona in a Champions League group stage match. The goal against Barcelona was described as a "heavenly thunderbolt" by many of his teammates and was remembered as one of the goals of the tournament.

2012–13 season

In Match Day One UEFA Europa League 2012-2013 Inter Milan vs Rubin Kazan in Stadio Giuseppe Meazza Ryazantsev scored, a penalty when Nacho pushed over Handanovic and the ball rebounds immediately struck Ryazantsev and goals, but the outcome of the match ended 2-2. In match day three UEFA Europa League 2012-2013 Rubin Kazan vs Partizan in Central Stadium. Ryazantsev scored, when receiving feedback Karadeniz, and Rubin was a 2-0 Win in the match.

2013–14 season

In Match Day One UEFA Europa League 2013-2014 Maribor vs Rubin Kazan in Ljudski vrt Ryazantsev scored in minute 90 +4, capitalize on mistakes by the defense Ryazantsev directs the ball straight shot to the right corner of the goal. The goal was his third goal in the Europa League stage. Rubin was 5-2 win over Maribor. In match day three UEFA Europa League 2013-2014 Rubin Kazan vs Zulte Waregem in Central Stadium. Ryazantsev scored, receiving feedback breakthrough from Nacho, Ryazantsev calmly directed the ball straight shot into the left corner of the goal. The goal was his fourth goal in the Europa League stage. Rubin was 4-0 win over Zulte Waregem.

=== Zenit Saint Petersburg ===
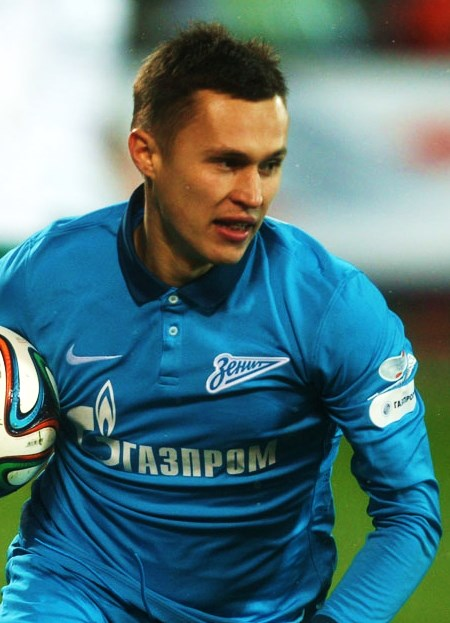
Ryazantsev in FC Zenit

Aleksandr Ryazantsev took little persuading to join Zenit Saint Petersburg on a free transfer from Rubin Kazan, saying the league leaders' offer "was the most interesting one". Players who have this terrible cannonball said he was happy to be joining with Zenit. Ryazantsev signed for Zenit Saint Petersburg. On 30 January 2014 Ryazantsev played a friendly match Zenit Saint Petersburg vs Shakhtar Donetsk, he scored with a penalty kick and brought Rubin Kazan Win 1-0 at Donbas Arena.

2014–15 season

In Quarter-finals UEFA Europa League 2014-2015 The First Leg Sevilla vs Zenit Saint Petersburg in Ramón Sánchez Pizjuán Ryazantsev struck just before the half-hour, He scored with a way to get a pass from teammate towards the left side and then he dribbled quickly and kicked the ball hard toward the goal keeper Sergio Rico then pushed over easily and the ball rebounds that led to her quickly struck by Ryazantsev himself and succeed becoming Goal. This match was won by Sevilla 2-1, For Ryazantsev own, this is the second Goal of the goal he scored to Spanish club.

=== Ural Sverdlovsk Oblast ===
On 24 February 2016, he was loaned to FC Ural Sverdlovsk Oblast until the end of the 2015-16 season.

=== Amkar Perm ===
On 11 July 2017, he was loaned to Amkar Perm until the end of the 2017-18 season.

On 10 June 2018, Ryazantsev announced that his Zenit contract that expired at the end of the 2017–18 season will not be extended.

=== Khimki ===
On 14 September 2018, he joined the Russian Football National League club FC Khimki.

=== Torpedo Moscow ===
On 11 June 2019, he signed a one-year contract with FC Torpedo Moscow.

On 30 May 2023, Ryazantsev extended his contract with Torpedo for the 2023–24 season.

== Attributes ==
Mainly a winger, he can also appear as a midfielder or attacking midfielder.

== International career ==
Ryazantsev was originally called up for Russian national team for a friendly against Belgium on 17 November 2010. He was not included in the final squad preparing for the game. On 7 June 2011, he made his debut for Russia in a friendly against Cameroon.

== Career statistics ==
Club	Season	League			Cup		Continental		Other		Total	
Club	Season	Division	Apps	Goals	Apps	Goals	Apps	Goals	Apps	Goals	Apps	Goals
Moscow	2003	Premier League	0	0	0	0	–		1 (Note: Appearance in the Russian Premier League Cup)	0	1	0
Moscow	2004	Premier League	2	0	0	0	–		–		2	0
Moscow	Total		2	0	0	0	0	0	1	0	3	0
Rubin Kazan	2006	Premier League	15	0	1	0	2 (Note: Appearances in the UEFA Cup)	0	–		18	0
Rubin Kazan	2007	Premier League	18	5	2	0	4 (Note: Appearances in the UEFA Intertoto Cup)	1	–		24	6
Rubin Kazan	2008	Premier League	22	1	0	0	–		–		22	1
Rubin Kazan	2009	Premier League	18	3	3	1	6 (Note: Appearances in the UEFA Champions League)	1	1 (Note: Appearances in the Russian Super Cup)	0	28	5
Rubin Kazan	2010	Premier League	13	2	1	0	6 (Note: Five appearances in the UEFA Champions League, one appearance in the UEFA Europa League)	0	–		20	2
Rubin Kazan	2011–12	Premier League	35	7	3	1	8 (Note: Appearances in the UEFA Europa League)	0	–		46	8
Rubin Kazan	2012–13	Premier League	19	0	0	0	4	2	1	0	24	2
Rubin Kazan	2013–14	Premier League	15	2	0	0	11	2	–		26	4
Rubin Kazan	Total		155	20	10	2	41	6	2	0	208	28
Zenit St. Petersburg	2013–14	Premier League	7	0	–		0	0	–		7	0
Zenit St. Petersburg	2014–15	Premier League	20	1	2	0	10 (Note: Five appearances in the UEFA Champions League, five appearances, one goal in the UEFA Europa League)	1	–		32	2
Zenit St. Petersburg	2015–16	Premier League	11	0	2	1	5	0	1	0	19	1
Zenit St. Petersburg	2016–17	Premier League	0	0	0	0	0	0	0	0	0	0
Zenit St. Petersburg	Total		38	1	4	1	15	1	1	0	58	3
Ural Yekaterinburg (loan)	2015–16	Premier League	11	0	–		–		–		11	0
Zenit-2 St. Petersburg	2016–17	First League	4	0	–		–		–		4	0
Amkar Perm (loan)	2017–18	Premier League	19	3	1	1	–		2 (Note: Appearances in the relegation play-offs)	0	22	4
Khimki	2018–19	First League	27	4	1	0	–		4 (Note: Appearances in the FNL Cup)	0	32	4
Torpedo Moscow	2019–20	First League	22	3	4	0	–		–		26	3
Torpedo Moscow	2020–21	First League	38	4	1	0	–		–		39	4
Torpedo Moscow	2021–22	First League	22	1	2	0	–		–		24	1
Torpedo Moscow	2022–23	Premier League	16	0	3	1	–		–		19	1
Torpedo Moscow	Total		98	8	10	1	0	0	0	0	108	9
Career total			354	36	26	5	56	7	10	0	446	48

== Honours ==
=== Club ===
Rubin Kazan

- Russian Premier League (2): 2008, 2009
- Russian Super Cup Runner-up (1): 2009
- Russian Super Cup (2): 2010, 2012
- Russian Cup Runner-up (1): 2009
- Russian Cup (1): 2012

Zenit Saint Petersburg

- Russian Premier League (1): 2014–15
- Russian Super Cup (1): 2015

Torpedo Moscow

- Russian Football National League (1) : 2021-22
