= Chidi Odiah =

Nigerian footballer (born 1983)

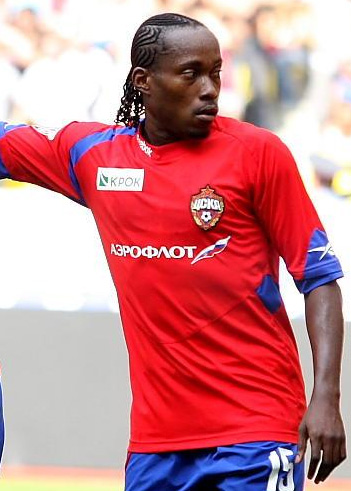
- Odiah with CSKA Moscow in 2009

Personal information
- Full name: Chukwudi Odiah
- Date of birth: 17 December 1983 (age 42)
- Place of birth: Port Harcourt, Nigeria
- Height: 1.83 m (6 ft 0 in)
- Position: Right-back

Youth career
- Eagle Cement

Senior career*
Years	Team	Apps	(Gls)
1998–1999	Eagle Cement	28	(3)
2000	Julius Berger	10	(1)
2000–2004	Sheriff Tiraspol	58	(5)
2004–2012	CSKA Moscow	105	(3)
Total		201	(12)

International career
2004–2010	Nigeria	28	(1)
- * Club domestic league appearances and goals

Chukwudi "Chidi" Odiah (born 17 December 1983) is a Nigerian former professional footballer who played as a right-back. A former international, he was known for his work ethic, skills and attacking prowess.

== Club career ==
=== Eagle Cement and Julius Berger ===
Odiah began his career with Eagle Cement in the Nigeria Premier League before moving to Julius Berger F.C. in 2000, for which he played 10 games and won the league.

=== Sheriff Tiraspol ===
In late 2000, Odiah moved to Sheriff Tiraspol. He appeared in 58 games and scored five goals, becoming one of the major players in the team as they dominated Moldovan football and won many honours.

=== CSKA Moscow ===
At the 2003 CIS Cup, Odiah drew the attention of CSKA Moscow and joined the club a year later on a four-year contract. His first trophy with the club was the 2004 Russian Super Cup. During CSKA's 2004–05 UEFA Cup campaign, he scored the first goal in the 4–0 quarter-final win over Auxerre, with the campaign culminating in CSKA winning the trophy by beating Sporting CP 3–1 in the final at the Estádio José Alvalade, where Odiah played the entire match. Later that year, he went on to win the Russian Cup and the Russian Premier League title, completing a historic treble. In the 2005 UEFA Super Cup, he played 90 minutes before being substituted ahead of extra time. In early 2006, Odiah won another Russian Super Cup, scoring a vital equalizer in the 3–2 victory over Spartak Moscow. However, shortly after, he sustained a severe knee injury, sidelining him for nearly 18 months and causing him to miss most of CSKA's domestic treble campaign. He later featured in the UEFA Champions League, notably helping the club reach the quarter-finals during the 2009–10 campaign, while also winning three more Russian Cups and two additional Russian Super Cups. He left CSKA by mutual consent on 16 February 2012.

== International career ==
Chidi represented his nation at various youth levels. He played for Nigeria U-17 national team to African U-17 Championship – winner of the tournament. On the next event, Meridian Cup, he was team captain. His premier match in the senior team took place in September 2004, in a match against Zimbabwe. Chidi also twice won the bronze medal with Nigeria senior team at the African Cup of Nations – 2006, 2010.

Odiah was chosen for the team of Nigeria to 2010 FIFA World Cup and in the first match against Argentina came into the starting lineup, as well in the match with South Korea, he made goal assist.

== Career statistics ==
=== Club ===
Appearances and goals by club, season and competition
Club	Season	League			National cup		Continental		Other		Total	
Club	Season	Division	Apps	Goals	Apps	Goals	Apps	Goals	Apps	Goals	Apps	Goals
CSKA Moscow	2004	Russian Premier League	21	0			6	0	–		27	0
CSKA Moscow	2005	Russian Premier League	27	2	6	0	15	1	1	0	49	3
CSKA Moscow	2006	Russian Premier League	3	0	2	0	1	0	1	1	7	1
CSKA Moscow	2007	Russian Premier League	4	0	0	0	2	0	0	0	6	0
CSKA Moscow	2008	Russian Premier League	23	0	1	0	4	0	–		28	0
CSKA Moscow	2009	Russian Premier League	13	0	2	0	3	0	–		18	0
CSKA Moscow	2010	Russian Premier League	11	1	1	0	2	0	–		14	1
CSKA Moscow	2011–12	Russian Premier League	3	0	0	0	0	0	–		0	0
CSKA Moscow	Total		105	3	12	0	33	1	2	1	152	5
Career total			105	3	12	0	33	1	2	1	152	5

=== International ===
Appearances and goals by national team and year
National team	Year	Apps	Goals
Nigeria	2004	2	0
Nigeria	2005	5	0
Nigeria	2006	6	0
Nigeria	2007	0	0
Nigeria	2008	4	1
Nigeria	2009	2	0
Nigeria	2010	9	0
Total		28	1

Score and result list Nigeria's goal tally first, score column indicates score after Odiah goal.

International goal scored by Chidi Odiah
No.	Date	Venue	Opponent	Score	Result	Competition
1	11 October 2008	Abuja, Nigeria	Sierra Leone	4–1	4–1	2010 FIFA World Cup qualification

== Honours ==
Julius Berger

- Nigeria Premier League: 2000

Sheriff Tiraspol

- Moldovan National Division: 2000–01, 2001–02, 2002–03, 2003–04
- Moldovan Cup: 2001, 2002
- Moldovan Super Cup: 2003
- CIS Cup: 2003

CSKA Moscow

- UEFA Cup: 2005
- Russian Premier League: 2005, 2006
- Russian Cup: 2005, 2006, 2008, 2009, 2011
- Russian Super Cup: 2004, 2006, 2007, 2009

Nigeria

- African Cup of Nations Bronze medalist: 2006, 2010

Nigeria U17

- African U-17 Championship: 2001

Individual

- In the list of 33 best football players of the championship of Russia: position right half-backs № 1 (2005)
- In the list of 33 best football players of the championship of Russia: position right full-backs № 2 (2004)
