= Stanislav Sukhina =

Russian footballer and official

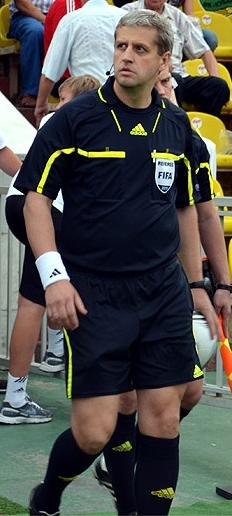
Stanislav Sukhina

Stanislav Valeryevich Sukhina (Russian: Станислав Валерьевич Сухина; born August 16, 1968, in Cherkasy, Ukraine, Soviet Union) is a Russian football official and a former referee and player.

As a player, he played in the lower leagues for FC Avangard Kolomna (1989), FC Saturn Ramenskoye (1990) and FC Gigant Voskresensk (1994). He has been a FIFA international referee since 2003. He lives in Malakhovka and works as a university teacher. He has refereed games in 2010 World Cup qualifiers, the UEFA Champions League qualification rounds, and the UEFA Cup. He retired as a referee in 2012.

After retirement as a referee, he worked as the team director for FC Lokomotiv Moscow until June 2021. He was appointed team director of FC Fakel Voronezh in 2022.
