= Lasha Salukvadze =

Georgian footballer

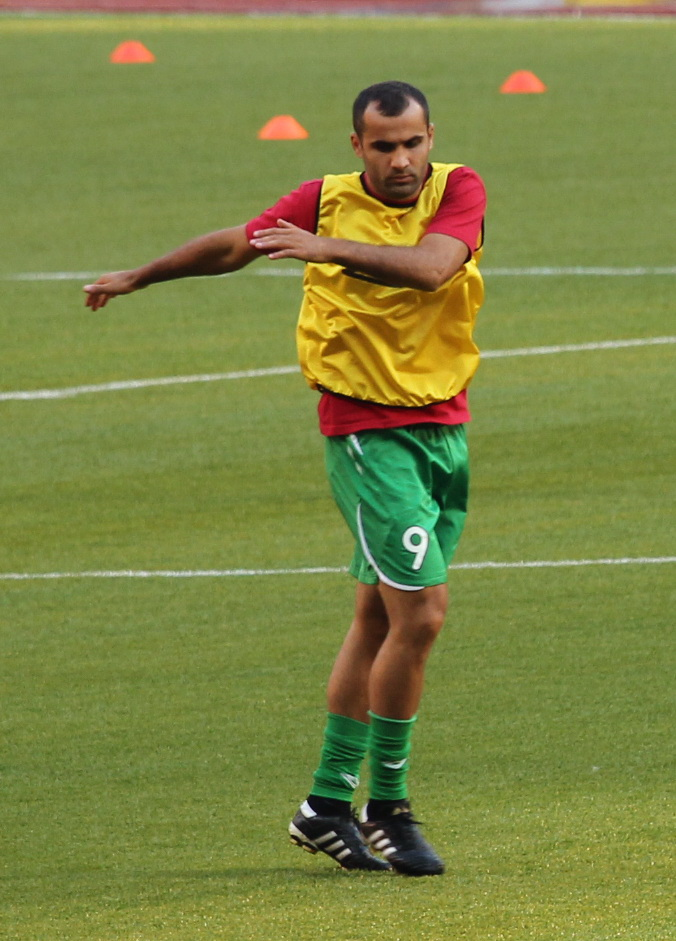

Personal information
- Date of birth: 21 December 1981 (age 44)
- Place of birth: Tbilisi, Georgian SSR
- Height: 1.84 m (6 ft 0 in)
- Position: Defender

Team information
- Current team: Georgia U21 (assistant coach)

Senior career*
Years	Team	Apps	(Gls)
2000–2004	Lokomotivi Tbilisi	86	(2)
2004	Dinamo Tbilisi	12	(1)
2005–2010	Rubin Kazan	91	(2)
2011–2012	Volga Nizhny Novgorod	15	(0)
2012–2013	Dila Gori	28	(1)
2013	SKA-Energiya Khabarovsk	9	(0)
2013–2016	Inter Baku	76	(1)
2016	Dila Gori	11	(0)
2017	Dinamo Tbilisi	25	(0)

International career
2001–2003	Georgia U-21	9	(0)
2004–2015	Georgia	38	(1)

Managerial career
- 2021–: Georgia U-21 (assistant)
- * Club domestic league appearances and goals

Lasha Salukvadze (Georgian: ლაშა სალუქვაძე, born 21 December 1981) is a Georgian football coach and a former player. He is an assistant coach with the Georgian national under-21 team.

== Career ==
=== Club ===
In July 2013 Salukvadze signed for Azerbaijan Premier League side Inter Baku on a two-year contract.

=== International ===
At international level, he played 7 games in UEFA Euro 2008 qualifying for Georgia. On 11 March 2010, he appeared to 'purposely' stamp on Edin Dzeko's face in a 1–1 home draw in the UEFA Europa League.

== Career statistics ==
As of 21 December 2015

Club performance			League		Cup		Continental		Total	
Season	Club	League	Apps	Goals	Apps	Goals	Apps	Goals	Apps	Goals
1999–2000	Lokomotivi Tbilisi	Umaglesi Liga	1	0			0	0	1	0
2000–01	Lokomotivi Tbilisi	Umaglesi Liga	17	0			0	0	17	0
2001–02	Lokomotivi Tbilisi	Umaglesi Liga	28	1			2	0	30	1
2002–03	Lokomotivi Tbilisi	Umaglesi Liga	32	1			2	0	34	1
2003–04	Lokomotivi Tbilisi	Umaglesi Liga	8	0			-		8	0
2004–05	Dinamo Tbilisi	Umaglesi Liga	15	0			9	0	24	0
2005	Rubin Kazan	Russian Premier League	22	0			-		22	0
2006	Rubin Kazan	Russian Premier League	19	0			1	0	20	0
2007	Rubin Kazan	Russian Premier League	15	1			2	0	17	1
2008	Rubin Kazan	Russian Premier League	15	0			-		15	0
2009	Rubin Kazan	Russian Premier League	10	1			5	0	10	1
2010	Rubin Kazan	Russian Premier League	10	0			7	0	10	0
2011–12	Volga Nizhny Novgorod	Russian Premier League	15	1	1	1	-		16	2
2011–12	Dila Gori	Umaglesi Liga	14	0	3	0	-		17	0
2012–13	Dila Gori	Umaglesi Liga	14	1	0	0	6	1	20	2
2012–13	SKA-Energiya	Russian National League	9	0	0	0	-		9	0
2013–14	Inter Baku	Azerbaijan Premier League	26	1	3	0	1	0	30	1
2014–15	Inter Baku	Azerbaijan Premier League	27	0	3	0	4	0	25	0
2015–16	Inter Baku	Azerbaijan Premier League	23	0	5	0	0	0	28	0
Total	Georgia		129	3	3	0	19	1	151	4
Total	Russia		120	3	1	1	15	0	136	4
Total	Azerbaijan		76	1	11	0	5	0	92	1
Career total			312	7	11	1	30	1	353	9

=== International ===
Georgia
Year	Apps	Goals
2004	2	0
2005	7	0
2006	2	0
2007	10	1
2008	6	0
2009	1	0
2010	4	0
2011	4	0
2014	1	0
2015	1	0
Total	38	1

Statistics accurate as of 9 June 2015.

== Honours ==
Lokomotivi Tbilisi

- Georgian Cup (2): 1999–2000, 2001–02

Dinamo Tbilisi

- Umaglesi Liga (1): 2004–05

Rubin Kazan

- Russian Premier League (2): 2008, 2009

Dila Gori

- Georgian Cup (1): 2011–12
