= Malakhovka =

Malakhovka (Russian: Мала́ховка) is the name of several inhabited localities in Russia.

Urban localities

- Malakhovka, Moscow Oblast, a suburb of Moscow with historic dachas in Lyuberetsky District of Moscow Oblast;, classified as an urban-type settlement.

Rural localities

- Malakhovka, Bryansk Oblast, a village in Kletnyansky District of Bryansk Oblast
- Malakhovka, Kursk Oblast, a village in Rylsky District of Kursk Oblast
- Malakhovka, Orenburg Oblast, a selo in Sorochinsky District of Orenburg Oblast
- Malakhovka, Pskov Oblast, a village in Porkhovsky District of Pskov Oblast
- Malakhovka, Saratov Oblast, a selo in Ozinsky District of Saratov Oblast
- Malakhovka, Smolensk Oblast, a village in Roslavlsky District of Smolensk Oblast
