= 2011–12 FC Rubin Kazan season =

Rubin Kazan
2011–12 season
- Chairman: Alexander Gusev
- Manager: Kurban Berdyev
- Stadium: Tsentralnyi Stadion, Kazan
- Russian Premier League: 6th
- Russian Cup: Champions
- 2010–11 UEFA Europa League: Round of 32 vs Twente
- 2011–12 UEFA Champions League: Play-off round vs Lyon
- 2011–12 UEFA Europa League: Round of 32 vs Olympiacos
- Top goalscorer: League: Bibras Natcho (9); All: Bibras Natcho (14)
Home colours	Away colours

The 2011–12 Rubin Kazan season was the 8th straight season that the club will play in the Russian Premier League, the highest tier of football in Russia.

== Squad ==
As of match played 13 May 2012

No.	Name	Nationality	Position	Date of birth (age)	Signed from	Signed in	Contract ends	Apps.	Goals
Goalkeepers
1	Sergey Ryzhikov	(Russia)	GK	19 September 1980 (aged 31)	Lokomotiv Moscow	2008		162	0
24	Giedrius Arlauskis	(Lithuania)	GK	1 December 1987 (aged 24)	Unirea Urziceni	2010		8	0
31	Aleksei Berezin	(Russia)	GK	16 April 1993 (aged 19)	Youth Team	2009		0	0
68	Dmitri Volkotrub	(Russia)	GK	23 April 1992 (aged 20)	Saturn Ramenskoye	2011		0	0
88	Alireza Haghighi	(Iran)	GK	2 May 1988 (aged 24)	Persepolis	2012		0	0
Defenders
2	Oleg Kuzmin	(Russia)	DF	9 May 1981 (aged 31)	Lokomotiv Moscow	2010		52	0
3	Cristian Ansaldi	(Argentina)	DF	20 September 1986 (aged 25)	Newell's Old Boys	2008	2014	129	2
4	César Navas	(Spain)	DF	14 February 1980 (aged 32)	Racing Santander	2009	2012	122	3
19	Vitali Kaleshin	(Russia)	DF	3 October 1980 (aged 31)	Moscow	2009		81	0
22	Aleksandr Orekhov	(Russia)	DF	29 November 1983 (aged 28)	Kuban Krasnodar	2008		37	1
27	Salvatore Bocchetti	(Italy)	DF	30 November 1986 (aged 25)	Genoa	2010		62	8
35	Viktor Garayev	(Russia)	DF	5 May 1994 (aged 18)	Youth Team	2012		0	0
36	Yuriy Savosin	(Russia)	DF	8 August 1995 (aged 16)	Youth Team	2012		0	0
37	Elmir Nabiullin	(Russia)	DF	3 August 1995 (aged 16)	Youth Team	2012		0	0
42	Marat Doyati	(Russia)	DF	18 February 1992 (aged 20)	FAYUR Beslan	2010		0	0
51	Avtandil Bratchuli	(Georgia (country))	DF	2 April 1992 (aged 18)	Gagra	2010		0	0
67	Solomon Kvirkvelia	(Georgia (country))	DF	6 February 1992 (aged 20)	Zenit St.Petersburg	2011		14	1
76	Roman Sharonov	(Russia)	DF	8 September 1976 (aged 35)	Shinnik Yaroslavl	2008			
84	Iskandar Dzhalilov	(Russia)	DF	1 June 1992 (aged 19)	CSKA Moscow	2010		0	0
Midfielders
7	Pyotr Bystrov	(Russia)	MF	15 July 1979 (aged 32)	Moscow	2009		48	0
8	Aleksandr Ryazantsev	(Russia)	MF	5 September 1986 (aged 25)	Moscow	2006		157	21
9	Pyotr Nemov	(Russia)	MF	18 October 1983 (aged 28)	Saturn Ramenskoye	2011		36	0
10	Alan Kasaev	(Russia)	MF	8 April 1986 (aged 24)	Kuban Krasnodar	2009		97	13
15	Syarhey Kislyak	(Belarus)	MF	6 August 1987 (aged 24)	Dinamo Minsk	2011		25	2
20	Alexei Eremenko	(Finland)	MF	24 March 1983 (aged 29)	Metalist Kharkiv	2011		7	0
23	Roman Eremenko	(Finland)	MF	19 March 1987 (aged 25)	Dynamo Kyiv	2011		25	3
30	Jonatan Valle	(Spain)	MF	30 December 1984 (aged 27)	Leganés	2012		3	0
34	Louay Ourourou	(Russia)	MF	8 December 1994 (aged 17)	Youth Team	2012		0	0
49	Mikheil Gorelishvili	(Russia)	MF	29 May 1993 (aged 18)	Chertanovo Moscow	2011		0	0
50	Parvizdzhon Umarbayev	(Russia)	MF	1 November 1994 (aged 17)	Regar-TadAZ	2009		0	0
54	Almaz Askarov	(Russia)	MF	28 October 1991 (aged 20)	Youth Team	2010		0	0
55	Artyom Kuklev	(Russia)	MF	28 October 1991 (aged 20)	Youth Team	2010		0	0
57	Nikita Lobanov	(Russia)	MF	20 February 1994 (aged 18)	Youth Team	2011		0	0
61	Gökdeniz Karadeniz	(Turkey)	MF	11 January 1980 (aged 32)	Trabzonspor	2008	2015	140	23
63	Alisher Dzhalilov	(Russia)	MF	29 August 1993 (aged 18)	Lokomotiv Moscow	2009		5	0
66	Bibras Natcho	(Israel)	MF	18 February 1988 (aged 24)	Hapoel Tel Aviv	2010		76	16
77	Nikita Bocharov	(Russia)	MF	12 June 1992 (aged 19)	Zenit St.Petersburg	2012		0	0
87	Carlos Eduardo	(Brazil)	MF	18 July 1987 (aged 24)	1899 Hoffenheim	2010		8	2
90	Artyom Kulesha	(Russia)	MF	14 January 1990 (aged 22)	Zenit St.Petersburg	2009		0	0
95	Dmitri Prokopenko	(Russia)	MF	23 July 1991 (aged 20)	Krasnodar-2000	2011		0	0
Forwards
5	Obafemi Martins	(Nigeria)	FW	28 October 1984 (aged 27)	VfL Wolfsburg	2010		34	4
12	Merabi Uridia	(Russia)	FW	8 June 1992 (aged 19)	Youth Team	2011		0	0
18	Nelson Valdez	(Paraguay)	FW	28 November 1983 (aged 28)	Hércules	2011		27	6
27	Vladimir Dyadyun	(Russia)	FW	12 July 1988 (aged 23)	Youth Team	2007		52	7
28	Sergei Davydov	(Russia)	FW	12 July 1988 (aged 23)	Kuban Krasnodar	2012		14	2
33	Igor Portnyagin	(Russia)	FW	7 January 1989 (aged 23)	SOYUZ-Gazprom Izhevsk	2008		10	3
38	German Sergeyev	(Russia)	FW	8 May 1995 (aged 17)	Youth Team	2012		0	0
39	Sayputtin Davydov	(Russia)	FW	5 November 1996 (aged 15)	Youth Team	2012		0	0
43	Konstantin Vasiljev	(Russia)	FW	5 February 1993 (aged 19)	Youth Team	2011		0	0
52	Ayubkhon Gapparov	(Uzbekistan)	FW	16 May 1992 (aged 19)	Pakhtakor Tashkent	2009		0	0
58	Andrei Vshivtsev	(Russia)	FW	25 January 1994 (aged 18)	Youth Team	2011		0	0
92	Wahyt Orazsähedow	(Turkmenistan)	FW	26 January 1992 (aged 20)	Köpetdag Aşgabat	2008		2	0
97	Georgi Nurov	(Russia)	FW	8 June 1992 (aged 19)	Lokomotiv Moscow	2012		0	0
Away on loan
14	Walter Chalá	(Ecuador)	FW	24 February 1992 (aged 20)	Cuenca	2011		0	0
21	Alexandru Antoniuc	(Moldova)	FW	23 May 1989 (aged 22)	Zimbru Chișinău	2010		3	0
41	Ilsur Samigullin	(Russia)	MF	6 February 1991 (aged 21)	Youth Team	2008		1	0
65	Maksim Zhestokov	(Russia)	DF	19 June 1991 (aged 20)	Youth Team	2008		3	0
79	Yuri Nesterenko	(Russia)	GK	12 June 1991 (aged 20)	Krasnodar-2000	2010		0	0
81	Ildar Bikchantayev	(Russia)	FW	2 February 1990 (aged 22)	Akademiya Dimitrovgrad	2008		2	0
86	Vitali Ustinov	(Russia)	DF	23 April 1990 (aged 22)	Moscow	2010		0	0
98	Ilie Cebanu	(Moldova)	GK	29 December 1986 (aged 25)	Wisła Kraków	2010		0	0
	Yevgeni Balyaikin	(Russia)	MF	19 May 1988 (aged 23)	Sibiryak Bratsk	2007		51	0
	Vagiz Galiulin	(Uzbekistan)	MF	10 October 1987 (aged 24)	Traktor Tashkent	2007		13	1
Players that left Rubin Kazan during the season
6	Michael Tukura	(Nigeria)	MF	19 October 1988 (aged 23)	loan from Ventspils	2011		0	0
11	Igor Lebedenko	(Russia)	FW	27 May 1983 (aged 28)	Rostov	2011		28	3
16	Christian Noboa	(Ecuador)	MF	9 April 1985 (aged 25)	Emelec	2007		149	26
26	Aleksei Medvedev	(Moldova)	FW	5 January 1977 (aged 35)	Sibir Novosibirsk	2010		44	5
32	Andrei Gorbanets	(Russia)	MF	24 August 1985 (aged 26)	Sibir Novosibirsk	2009		33	2
56	Ruslan Makhmutov	(Russia)	MF	27 January 1991 (aged 21)	Tolyatti	2010		2	0
64	Giorgi Chelebadze	(Georgia (country))	MF	1 January 1992 (aged 20)	Fakel Voronezh	2011		0	0
85	Marat Sitdikov	(Russia)	MF	23 July 1991 (aged 20)	Youth Team	2010		0	0
	Davit Kvirkvelia	(Georgia (country))	DF	27 June 1980 (aged 31)	Metalurh Zaporizhya	2008		33	3
	Anton Saroka	(Belarus)	FW	5 March 1992 (aged 20)	Dinamo Minsk	2010		0	0

=== Out on loan ===
Note: Flags indicate national team as defined under FIFA eligibility rules; some limited exceptions apply. Players may hold more than one non-FIFA nationality.

No.	Pos.	Nation	Player
14	FW	VEN	Walter Chalá (on loan at Cuenca until December 2012)
21	FW	MDA	Alexandru Antoniuc (on loan at KAMAZ until end of the season)
41	MF	RUS	Ilsur Samigullin (on loan at Neftekhimik Nizhnekamsk until end of the season)
65	DF	RUS	Maksim Zhestokov (on loan at KAMAZ until end of the season)
79	GK	RUS	Yuri Nesterenko (on loan at Rubin-2 Kazan until end of the season)

No.	Pos.	Nation	Player
81	FW	RUS	Ildar Bikchantayev (on loan at Neftekhimik Nizhnekamsk until end of the season)
86	DF	RUS	Vitali Ustinov (on loan at Neftekhimik Nizhnekamsk until end of the 2012/13 season)
98	GK	MDA	Ilie Cebanu (on loan at Tom Tomsk until end of the season)
—	MF	RUS	Yevgeni Balyaikin (on loan at Tom Tomsk until end of the season)
—	MF	UZB	Vagiz Galiulin (on loan at Sibir Novosibirsk until end of the season)

== Transfers ==
=== In ===
Date	Position	Nationality	Name	From	Fee	Ref.
Winter 2011	DF	(Georgia (country))	Solomon Kverkvelia	Zenit St.Petersburg	Undisclosed	
Winter 2011	FW	(Russia)	Igor Lebedenko	Rostov	Undisclosed	
1 January 2011	MF	(Belarus)	Syarhey Kislyak	Dinamo Minsk	Undisclosed	
7 January 2011	FW	(Ecuador)	Walter Chalá	Cuenca	Undisclosed	
1 February 2011	MF	(Russia)	Pyotr Nemov	Saturn Ramenskoye	Undisclosed	
Summer 2011	MF	(Georgia (country))	Giorgi Chelebadze	Fakel Voronezh	Undisclosed	
Summer 2011	MF	(Finland)	Alexei Eremenko	Metalist Kharkiv	Undisclosed	
Summer 2011	MF	(Finland)	Roman Eremenko	Dynamo Kyiv	Undisclosed	
Summer 2011	FW	(Paraguay)	Nelson Valdez	Hércules	Undisclosed	
14 January 2012	GK	(Iran)	Alireza Haghighi	Persepolis	Undisclosed	
18 February 2012	MF	(Russia)	Nikita Bocharov	Zenit St.Petersburg	Undisclosed	
18 February 2012	FW	(Russia)	Georgi Nurov	Lokomotiv Moscow	Undisclosed	
Winter 2012	MF	(Spain)	Jonatan Valle	Leganés	Undisclosed	
Winter 2012	FW	(Russia)	Sergei Davydov	Kuban Krasnodar	Undisclosed	

=== Loans in ===
Date from	Position	Nationality	Name	To	Date to	Ref.
Summer 2011	MF	(Nigeria)	Michael Tukura	Ventspils		

=== Out ===
Date	Position	Nationality	Name	To	Fee	Ref.
Winter 2011	DF	(Russia)	Mikhail Mischenko	Torpedo Moscow	Undisclosed	
7 January 2011	MF	(Russia)	Andrei Gorbanets	Krasnodar	Undisclosed	
24 January 2011	DF	(Georgia (country))	Lasha Salukvadze	Volga Nizhny Novgorod	Undisclosed	
24 January 2011	MF	(Poland)	Rafał Murawski	Lech Poznań	Undisclosed	
Summer 2011	DF	(Russia)	Ruslan Makhmutov	Neftekhimik Nizhnekamsk	Undisclosed	
Summer 2011	FW	(Uzbekistan)	Bahodir Nasimov	Neftçi Baku	Undisclosed	
29 December 2011	FW	(Russia)	Aleksei Medvedev	Sibir Novosibirsk	Undisclosed	
19 January 2012	DF	(Spain)	Jordi	Club Brugge KV	Undisclosed	
25 January 2012	FW	(Russia)	Igor Lebedenko	Terek Grozny	Undisclosed	
26 January 2012	MF	(Ecuador)	Christian Noboa	Dynamo Moscow	Undisclosed	
Winter 2012	DF	(Russia)	Anri Khagush	Spartak Nalchik	Undisclosed	

=== Loans out ===
Date from	Position	Nationality	Name	To	Date to	Ref.
Winter 2011	GK	(Moldova)	Ilie Cebanu	Volgar Astrakhan	Winter 2012	
Winter 2011	MF	(Uzbekistan)	Vagiz Galiulin	Sibir Novosibirsk	End of Season	
Winter 2012	DF	(Russia)	Aleksandr Kulikov	Spartak Nalchik		
Winter 2011	DF	(Russia)	Sergei Nesterenko	SKA-Energiya Khabarovsk		
Winter 2011	DF	(Russia)	Vitali Ustinov	Neftekhimik Nizhnekamsk		
Winter 2011	MF	(Russia)	Aleksei Kotlyarov	Neftekhimik Nizhnekamsk		
Winter 2011	MF	(Russia)	Artyom Kulesha	Rostov	Winter 2012	
Winter 2011	MF	(Russia)	Ilsur Samigullin	Neftekhimik Nizhnekamsk		
Winter 2011	FW	(Belarus)	Anton Saroka	Partizan Minsk		
Winter 2011	FW	(Russia)	Ildar Bikchantayev	Neftekhimik Nizhnekamsk		
28 January 2011	FW	(Nigeria)	Obafemi Martins	Birmingham City	Summer 2011	
3 February 2011	MF	(Russia)	Yevgeni Balyaikin	Tom Tomsk	Summer 2011	
7 March 2011	FW	(Russia)	Igor Portnyagin	Spartak Nalchik		
Summer 2011	GK	(Russia)	Yuri Nesterenko	Rubin-2 Kazan		
Summer 2011	DF	(Spain)	Jordi	Rayo Vallecano		
Summer 2011	FW	(Russia)	Igor Portnyagin	Spartak Nalchik	6 July 2011	
7 February 2012	FW	(Ecuador)	Walter Chalá	Cuenca	End of 2012	
12 February 2012	DF	(Russia)	Maksim Zhestokov	KAMAZ		
Winter 2012	GK	(Moldova)	Ilie Cebanu	Tom Tomsk		
Winter 2012	DF	(Russia)	Anton Piskunov	KAMAZ		
Winter 2012	MF	(Russia)	Marat Sitdikov	Neftekhimik Nizhnekamsk		
Winter 2012	FW	(Russia)	Igor Portnyagin	Tom Tomsk		

=== Released ===
Date	Position	Nationality	Name	Joined	Date
Winter 2012	MF	(Georgia (country))	Giorgi Chelebadze	Adeli Batumi	

== Friendlies ==
=== 2012 Marbella Cup ===
3 February 2012 Quarter-Final	Rubin Kazan (Russia)	5–1	(Georgia (country)) Zestaponi	Marbella, Spain
22:30	Sharonov 19'; Karadeniz 56'; Orazsahedov 67'; Martins 85'; Bystrov 88' (pen.)	Summary	Grigalashvili 26'	Stadium: Estadio Municipal de Marbella

6 February 2012 Semi-Final	Rubin Kazan (Russia)	3–1	(Poland) Lech Poznań	Marbella, Spain
21:30	Martins 12', 29' (red card) 52'; Sharonov (red card) 58'; Orazsahedov 66'	Summary	Rudņevs 20'	Stadium: Estadio Municipal de Marbella

9 February 2012 Final	Rubin Kazan (Russia)	2–1	(Ukraine) Dynamo Kyiv	Marbella, Spain
21:30	Karadeniz 23'; Eremenko 90+3'	Summary	Milevskyi 86'	Stadium: Estadio Municipal de Marbella

== Competitions ==
=== Russian Premier League ===
==== Matches ====
13 March 2011 1	Kuban Krasnodar	0–2	Rubin Kazan	Krasnodar, Krasnodar Krai
11:00		Report	Kasaev 52'; Noboa 88' (pen.)	Stadium: Kuban Stadium; Attendance: 16,000; Referee: (Russia) Mikhail Vilkov

20 March 2011 2	Rubin Kazan	2–0	Terek	Kazan
13:30	Karadeniz 33'; Noboa 57'	Report		Stadium: Tsentralnyi Stadion; Attendance: 11,000; Referee: (Russia) Yuri Baskakov

3 April 2011 3	Anzhi	1–0	Rubin Kazan	Makhachkala, Dagestan
13:15	Holenda 7'	Report		Stadium: Dynamo Stadium; Attendance: 12,500; Referee: (Russia) Alexey Nikolaev

10 April 2011 4	Rubin Kazan	0–0	Spartak Nalchik	Kazan
13:15	Noboa (yellow card) 9' (yellow-red card) 83'	Report		Stadium: Tsentralnyi Stadion; Attendance: 11,700; Referee: Aleksey Eskov

16 April 2011 5	CSKA	2–0	Rubin Kazan	Moscow
13:45	González 27'; Doumbia 50'	Report		Stadium: Arena Khimki; Attendance: 12,000; Referee: Vladislav Bezborodov

23 April 2011 6	Rubin Kazan	1–1	Amkar	Kazan, Tatarstan
	Ryazantsev 42'	Report	Sharonov 56' (o.g.)	Stadium: Central Stadium; Attendance: 14,250; Referee: Maxim Layushkin

30 April 2011 7	Krylia Sovetov	2–2	Rubin Kazan	Samara, Samara Oblast
	Samsonov 8'; Savin 64'	Summary	Noboa 6' (pen.); Dyadyun 57'	Stadium: Metallurg Stadium; Attendance: 12,700; Referee: Mikhail Vilkov

7 May 2011 8	Rubin Kazan	2–1	Krasnodar	Kazan, Tatarstan
18:30 MSK (UTC+4)	Karadeniz 36', 68'	Summary	Sharonov 10' (o.g.)	Stadium: Central Stadium; Attendance: 14,190; Referee: Sergey Karasev

14 May 2011 9	Zenit	2–2	Rubin Kazan	Saint Petersburg
	Danny 9'; Kerzhakov 71'	Summary	Karadeniz 19'; Medvedev 31'	Stadium: Petrovsky Stadium; Attendance: 19,500; Referee: Yuri Baskakov

19 May 2011 10	Rubin Kazan	0–0	Lokomotiv	Kazan, Tatarstan
17:30		Summary		Stadium: Central Stadium; Attendance: 21,400; Referee: Stanislav Sukhina

26 May 2011 11	Rubin Kazan	4–1	Tom Tomsk	Kazan, Tatarstan
15:45	Ryazantsev 7'; Medvedev 32'; Noboa 58'; Natcho 76' (pen.)	Summary	Skoblyakov 38' (pen.)	Stadium: Central Stadium; Attendance: 12,300; Referee: Maxim Layushkin

9 June 2011 12	Spartak Moscow	0–0	Rubin Kazan	Moscow
18:00		Summary		Stadium: Luzhniki Stadium; Attendance: 13,045; Referee: Vladislav Bezborodov

13 June 2011 13	Rubin Kazan	3–0	Dynamo	Kazan, Tatarstan
18:00	Bocchetti 42'; Navas 77'; Natcho 90+3' (pen.)	Summary		Stadium: Central Stadium; Attendance: 17,120; Referee: Vladimir Pettay

17 June 2011 14	Rostov	1–3	Rubin Kazan	Rostov-on-Don, Rostov Oblast
18:00	Kirichenko 50' (pen.)	Summary	Lebdenko 13'; Ryazantsev 82'; Kislyak 90'	Stadium: Olimp – 2 Attendance: 9,500; Referee: Aleksandr Egorov

21 June 2011 15	Rubin Kazan	2–0	Volga	Kazan, Tatarstan
15:45	Bocchetti 49'; Kasaev 83'	Summary		Stadium: Central Stadium; Attendance: 12,720; Referee: Stanislav Sukhina

25 June 2011 16	Rubin Kazan	0–2	Kuban Krasnodar	Kazan, Tatarstan
15:45		Summary	Zelão 53'; Bucur 69'	Stadium: Central Stadium; Attendance: 17,120; Referee: Igor Egorov

22 July 2011 17	Terek	0–1	Rubin Kazan	Grozny, Chechnya
16:45		Summary	Kasaev 85'	Stadium: Sultan Bilimkhanov Stadium; Attendance: 16,355; Referee: Aleksey Eskov

29 July 2011 18	Rubin Kazan	0–3	Anzhi	Kazan, Tatarstan
14:45		Summary	Gadzhiev 51'; Prudnikkov 66'; Boussoufa 90' (pen.)	Stadium: Central Stadium; Attendance: 18,520; Referee: Alexey Nikolaev

6 August 2011 19	Spartak Nalchik	0–1	Rubin Kazan	Nalchik, Kabardino-Balkaria
14:45		Summary	Lebedenko 72'	Stadium: Spartak Stadium; Attendance: 5,000; Referee: (Russia) Almir Kayumov

12 August 2011 20	Rubin Kazan	1–1	CSKA	Kazan, Tatarstan
15:30	Natcho 33' (pen.)	Summary	Dzagoev 90+4'	Stadium: Central Stadium; Attendance: 24,750; Referee: (Russia) Stanislav Sukhina

19 August 2011 21	Amkar	1–1	Rubin Kazan	Perm, Perm Krai
13:00	Sekretov 36'	Summary	Kverkvelia 84'	Stadium: Zvezda Stadium; Attendance: 7,500; Referee: (Russia) Mikhail Vilkov

26 August 2011 22	Rubin Kazan	1–0	Krylia Sovetov	Kazan, Tatarstan
15:45	Dyadyun 36'	Summary		Stadium: Central Stadium; Attendance: 16,340; Referee: (Russia) Sergey Lapochkin

9 September 2011 23	Krasnodar	3–1	Rubin Kazan	Krasnodar
19:00 MSK (UTC+4)	Movsisyan 8' (pen.); Amisulashvili 61'; Joãozinho 90+4'	Summary	Natcho 86' (pen.)	Stadium: Kuban Stadium; Attendance: 8,000; Referee: Igor Egorov

16 September 2011 24	Rubin Kazan	2–3	Zenit	Kazan, Tatarstan
	Natcho 8' (pen.); Kislyak 23'	Summary	Shirokov 28'; Danny 50', 68'	Stadium: Central Stadium; Attendance: 21,450

23 September 2011 25	Lokomotiv	1–1	Rubin Kazan	Moscow
	Dyadyun 52'	Summary	Zapater 77' (o.g.)	Stadium: Lokomotiv Stadium; Attendance: 14,059

1 October 2011 26	Tom Tomsk	0–2	Rubin Kazan	Tomsk, Tomsk Oblast
		Summary	Bocchetti 51', 84'	Stadium: Trud Stadium; Attendance: 8,000

15 October 2011 27	Rubin Kazan	3–0	Spartak Moscow	Kazan, Tatarstan
	Noboa 54'; Ryazantsev 58'; Natcho 90+3'	Summary		Stadium: Central Stadium; Attendance: 23,650

22 October 2011 28	Dynamo	0–2	Rubin Kazan	Moscow
		Summary	Ryazantsev 58'; Natcho 68'	Stadium: Arena Khimki; Attendance: 8,603

27 October 2011 29	Rubin Kazan	1–1	Rostov	Kazan, Tatarstan
	Salvatore Bocchetti 56'	Summary	Grigoryev 61'	Stadium: Central Stadium; Attendance: 9,710

5 November 2011 30	Volga	1–0	Rubin Kazan	Nizhny Novgorod, Nizhny Novgorod Oblast
	Bibilov 30'	Summary		Stadium: Lokomotiv Stadium; Attendance: 4,000

==== Table ====
Pos	Team	Pld	W	D	L	GF	GA	GD	Pts	Qualification
5	Lokomotiv Moscow	30	15	8	7	49	30	+19	53 (Note: Spartak Moscow ahead of Lokomotiv Moscow on head-to-head points; Lokomotiv Moscow–Spartak Moscow 0–2, Spartak Moscow–Lokomotiv Moscow 3–0.)	Qualification to Championship group
6	Kuban Krasnodar	30	14	7	9	38	27	+11	49	Qualification to Championship group
7	Rubin Kazan	30	13	10	7	40	27	+13	49	Qualification to Championship group
8	Anzhi Makhachkala	30	13	9	8	38	32	+6	48	Qualification to Championship group
9	Krasnodar	30	10	8	12	38	43	−5	38	Qualification to Relegation group

Source: Russian Premier League
Rules for classification: 1) points; 2) number of wins; 3) head-to-head points; 4) number of head-to-head wins; 5) head-to-head goal difference; 6) number of head-to-head goals scored; 7) number of head-to-head away goals scored; 8) goal difference; 9) number of goals scored; 10) number of away goals scored.

=== Russian Premier League – Championship group ===
==== Results by round ====
Round	1	2	3	4	5	6	7	8	9	10	11	12	13	14
Ground	A	H	H	H	A	A	H	A	H	A	H	H	A	H
Result	W	W	D	D	L	D	W	D	L	L	D	D	L	W
Position	6	5	6	6	6	6	6	6	6	6	7	7	7	6

Updated to match(es) played on 8 November 2011. Source: Russian Premier League
A = Away; H = Home; W = Win; D = Draw; L = Loss

==== Matches ====
20 November 2011 31	CSKA Moscow	1–2	Rubin Kazan	Moscow
	Doumbia 36' (pen.)	Summary	Kasaev 16'; Ryazantsev 61'	Stadium: Luzhniki Stadium; Referee: Vladislav Bezborodov

26 November 2011 32	Rubin Kazan	2–0	Dynamo Moscow	Kazan
	Eremenko 4'; Karadeniz 22'; Bocchetti (red card) 78'	Summary		Stadium: Central Stadium; Attendance: 16120

2 March 2012 33	Rubin Kazan	1–1	Spartak Moscow	Kazan
	Sharonov 58'	Summary	Emenike 80'	Stadium: Central Stadium; Attendance: 16,150

11 March 2012 34	Rubin Kazan	0–0	Lokomotiv Moscow	Kazan
		Summary		Stadium: Central Stadium; Attendance: 7,280

18 March 2012 35	Kuban Krasnodar	1–0	Rubin Kazan	Krasnodar, Krasnodar Krai
	Pizzelli 43'	Summary		Stadium: Kuban Stadium; Attendance: 18,233

24 March 2012 36	Zenit St. Petersburg	1–1	Rubin Kazan	Saint Petersburg
	Huszti 36'	Summary	Haedo Valdez 58'	Stadium: Petrovsky Stadium; Attendance: 18,800

31 March 2012 37	Rubin Kazan	1–0	Anzhi Makhachkala	Kazan
	Martins 50'	Summary		Stadium: Central Stadium; Attendance: 19,200

7 April 2012 38	Dynamo Moscow	1–1	Rubin Kazan	Moscow
	Misimović 10'	Summary	Valdez 68'	Stadium: Arena Khimki; Attendance: 6,833

15 April 2012 39	Spartak Moscow	2–0	Rubin Kazan	Moscow
	Emenike 7'; Ari 60'	Summary		Stadium: Luzhniki Stadium; Attendance: 12,817

21 April 2012 40	Lokomotiv Moscow	2–0	Rubin Kazan	Moscow
	Suchý 75'; Emenike 82'	Summary		Stadium: Lokomotiv Stadium; Attendance: 16,055

28 April 2012 41	Rubin Kazan	1–1	Kuban Krasnodar	Kazan
18:00 MSK (UTC+4)	Natcho 83' (pen.)	Summary	Bucur (yellow card) 25'; Lolo (yellow card) 57'; Pizzelli (yellow card) 69'; Kulik (yellow card) 73'; Tsorayev (yellow card) 74'	Stadium: Central Stadium; Attendance: 12,556; Referee: Maxim Layushkin

2 May 2012 42	Rubin Kazan	2–2	Zenit St. Petersburg	Kazan
	Ryazantsev 8'; Natcho 59'	Summary	Semak 50'; Arshavin 68'	Stadium: Central Stadium; Attendance: 12,550

6 May 2012 43	Anzhi Makhachkala	3–1	Rubin Kazan	Makhachkala, Dagestan
	Boussoufa 13'; Samba 59'; Eto'o 89'	Summary	Dyadyun 1'	Stadium: Dynamo Stadium; Attendance: 14,950

13 May 2012 44	Rubin Kazan	3–1	CSKA Moscow	Kazan
	Haedo Valdez 47'; Karadeniz 82'; Eremenko 88'	Summary	Honda 45'	Stadium: Tsentralnyi Stadion; Attendance: 18,472

==== League table ====
Pos	Team	Pld	W	D	L	GF	GA	GD	Pts	Qualification
1	Zenit St. Petersburg (C)	44	24	16	4	85	40	+45	88	Qualification to Champions League group stage
2	Spartak Moscow	44	21	12	11	69	47	+22	75	Qualification to Champions League play-off round
3	CSKA Moscow	44	19	16	9	72	47	+25	73	Qualification to Europa League play-off round
4	Dynamo Moscow	44	20	12	12	66	50	+16	72	Qualification to Europa League third qualifying round
5	Anzhi Makhachkala	44	19	13	12	54	42	+12	70	Qualification to Europa League second qualifying round
6	Rubin Kazan	44	17	17	10	55	41	+14	68	Qualification to Europa League group stage (Note: Rubin have won the 2011–12 Russian Cup and thus have qualified for the group stage of the 2012–13 UEFA Europa League.)
7	Lokomotiv Moscow	44	18	12	14	59	48	+11	66	
8	Kuban Krasnodar	44	15	16	13	50	45	+5	61	

Source: Russian Premier League
Rules for classification: 1) points; 2) number of wins; 3) head-to-head points; 4) number of head-to-head wins; 5) head-to-head goal difference; 6) number of head-to-head goals scored; 7) number of head-to-head away goals scored; 8) goal difference; 9) number of goals scored; 10) number of away goals scored
(C) Champions

=== Russian Cup 2011–12 ===
17 July 2011 Round of 32	Ural	0–0 (a.e.t.) (5–6 p)	Rubin Kazan	Yekaterinburg
15:00 MSK (UTC+4)		Report; Summary	Sharonov (yellow card) 115' (yellow-red card) 118'; Kaleshin (yellow card) 33' (yellow-red card) 120'	Stadium: Uralmash Stadium; Attendance: 11,500; Referee: Aleksei Reznikov
	Penalties
	Tumasyan (penalty missed); Zabolotny (penalty scored); Safronidi (penalty scored); Semakin (penalty scored); Shatov (penalty scored); Lungu (penalty scored)		(penalty scored) Medvedev; (penalty scored) Dzhalilov; (penalty scored) Ansaldi; (penalty scored) Karadeniz; (penalty missed) Nemov; (penalty scored) Kislyak; (penalty scored) Makhmutov

21 September 2011 Round of 16	Amkar Perm	0–2	Rubin Kazan	Perm
17:00 MSK (UTC+4)		Report; Summary	Lebedenko 10'; Kasaev 25'	Stadium: Zvezda Stadium; Attendance: 6,400; Referee: Igor Fedotov

21 March 2012 Quarterfinals	Rubin Kazan	4–0	Lokomotiv Moscow	Grozny
18:30 MSK (UTC+4)	Karadeniz 30', 70'; Ryazantsev 49'; Davydov 81'	Summary		Stadium: Akhmat-Arena; Attendance: 13,400; Referee: Vitali Meshkov

11 April 2012 Semi-Final	Rubin Kazan	2–0	FC Rostov	Kazan
18:00 MSK (UTC+4)	Bocchetti 82'; Smolnikov 84' (o.g.)	Summary		Stadium: Tsentralnyi Stadion; Attendance: 7,400; Referee: Alexey Nikolaev

==== Final ====
9 May 2012	Dynamo Moscow	0–1	Rubin Kazan	Yekaterinburg
15:00 MSK (UTC+4)		Summary	Eremenko 78'	Stadium: Tsentralnyi Stadion; Attendance: 27,000; Referee: Mikhail Vilkov

=== Europa League ===
==== 2010–11 ====
===== Knockout phase =====
17 February 2011 Round of 32 Leg 1	Rubin Kazan (Russia)	0–2	(Netherlands) Twente	Moscow^{1}, Russia
16:00 MSK (UTC+4)^{1}		Report	De Jong 77'; Wisgerhof 88'	Stadium: Luzhniki Stadium^{1} Attendance: 567; Referee: Robert Schörgenhofer (Austria)

25 February 2011 Round of 32 Leg 2	Twente (Netherlands)	2–2 (4–2 agg.)	(Russia) Rubin Kazan	Enschede, Netherlands
00:05 MSK (UTC+4)	Janssen 45+1'; Douglas 47'	Report	Ansaldi 22'; Noboa 24'	Stadium: De Grolsch Veste; Attendance: 23,000; Referee: Marcin Borski (Poland)

==== 2011–12 ====
===== Group stage =====
Pos	Team	Pld	W	D	L	GF	GA	GD	Pts	Qualification
1	(Greece) PAOK	6	3	3	0	10	6	+4	12	Advance to knockout phase
2	(Russia) Rubin Kazan	6	3	2	1	11	5	+6	11	Advance to knockout phase
3	(England) Tottenham Hotspur	6	3	1	2	9	4	+5	10	
4	(Republic of Ireland) Shamrock Rovers	6	0	0	6	4	19	−15	0	

Source: Soccerway

15 September 2011 1	Shamrock Rovers (Republic of Ireland)	0–3	(Russia) Rubin Kazan	Dublin, Ireland
21:00 MSK (UTC+4)		Report; Summary	Martins 3'; Noboa 50'; Gökdeniz 60'	Stadium: Tallaght Stadium; Attendance: 6,920; Referee: Zsolt Szabó (Hungary)

29 September 2011 2	Rubin Kazan (Russia)	2–2	(Greece) PAOK	Central Stadium
19:00 MSK (UTC+4)	Natcho 52'; Dyadyun 66'	Report; Summary	Athanasiadis 23'; Fotakis 81'	Stadium: Kazan, Russia; Attendance: 14,350; Referee: Martin Hansson (Sweden)

21 October 2011 3	Tottenham Hotspur (England)	1–0	(Russia) Rubin Kazan	London, England
00:05 MSK (UTC+4)	Pavlyuchenko 33'	Report; Summary		Stadium: White Hart Lane; Attendance: 24,058; Referee: Manuel De Sousa (Portugal)

3 November 2011 4	Rubin Kazan (Russia)	1–0	(England) Tottenham Hotspur	Kazan, Russia
20:00 MSK (UTC+4)	Natcho 55'	Report; Summary		Stadium: Central Stadium; Attendance: 21,250; Referee: Florian Meyer (Germany)

30 November 2011 5	Rubin Kazan (Russia)	4–1	(Republic of Ireland) Shamrock Rovers	Kazan, Russia
20:00 MSK (UTC+4)	Valdez 10', 51'; Natcho 36'; Martins 62'	Report; Summary	Oman 12'	Stadium: Central Stadium; Attendance: 15,740; Referee: Harald Lechner (Austria)

15 December 2011 6	PAOK (Greece)	1–1	(Russia) Rubin Kazan	Thessaloniki, Greece
21:00 MSK (UTC+4)	Vieirinha 16' (pen.)	Report	Ryzhikov (red card) 13'; Valdez 48'	Stadium: Toumba Stadium; Referee: Daniele Orsato (Italy)

===== Knockout phase =====
14 February 2012 Round of 32 1st leg	Rubin Kazan (Russia)	0–1	(Greece) Olympiacos	Moscow^{2}, Russia
15:00 MSK (UTC+4)		Summary	Fuster 71'; Megyeri (red card) 72'	Stadium: Luzhniki Stadium^{2} Referee: Milorad Mažić (Serbia)

24 February 2012 Round of 32 2nd leg	Olympiacos (Greece)	1–0 (2–0 agg.)	(Russia) Rubin Kazan	Piraeus, Greece
00:05 MSK (UTC+4)	Djebbour 14'	Report		Stadium: Karaiskakis Stadium; Attendance: 30,000; Referee: Stefan Johannesson (Sweden)

=== UEFA Champions League ===
==== Qualifying round ====
26 July 2011 Third qualifying round 1st Leg	Dynamo Kyiv (Ukraine)	0–2	(Russia) Rubin Kazan	Kyiv
20:00		Report; Summary	Kasaev 6'; Natcho 68' (pen.)	Stadium: Lobanovsky Dynamo Stadium; Attendance: 16,430; Referee: David Fernández Borbalán (Spain)

3 August 2011 Third qualifying round 2nd Leg	Rubin Kazan (Russia)	2–1 (4–1 agg.)	(Ukraine) Dynamo Kyiv	Kazan
18:00	Dyadyun 19'; Medvedev 88'	Report	Husyev 90+2'	Stadium: Central Stadium; Attendance: 19,820; Referee: Eric Braamhaar (Netherlands)

16 August 2011 Play-off round 1st Leg	Lyon (France)	3–1	(Russia) Rubin Kazan	Lyon
20:45	Gomis 10'; Kvirkvelia 40' (o.g.); Briand 71'	Report; Summary	Dyadyun 3'	Stadium: Stade de Gerland; Attendance: 35,468; Referee: Gianluca Rocchi (Italy)

24 August 2011 Play-off round 2nd Leg	Rubin Kazan (Russia)	1–1 (2–4 agg.)	(France) Lyon	Central Stadium
18:00	Natcho 77'	Report; Summary	B. Koné 87'	Stadium: Kazan; Attendance: 20,620; Referee: Frank De Bleeckere (Belgium)

== Squad statistics ==
As of match played 13 May 2012

=== Appearances and goals ===
No.	Pos	Nat	Player	Total		Premier League		Russian Cup		Champions League		Europa League	
No.	Pos	Nat	Player	Apps	Goals	Apps	Goals	Apps	Goals	Apps	Goals	Apps	Goals
1	GK	(Russia) RUS	Sergey Ryzhikov	58	0	41	0	5	0	4	0	8	0
2	DF	(Russia) RUS	Oleg Kuzmin	37	0	24+3	0	3	0	1	0	5+1	0
3	DF	(Argentina) ARG	Cristian Ansaldi	38	0	26+1	0	2+1	0	1	0	3+4	0
4	DF	(Spain) ESP	César Navas	47	1	34+1	1	3	0	0	0	9	0
5	FW	(Nigeria) NGR	Obafemi Martins	17	2	4+4	1	0+1	0	0+1	0	5+2	1
7	MF	(Russia) RUS	Pyotr Bystrov	22	0	8+8	0	1	0	0	0	2+3	0
8	MF	(Russia) RUS	Aleksandr Ryazantsev	46	8	32+3	7	3	1	0	0	7+1	0
9	MF	(Russia) RUS	Pyotr Nemov	36	0	11+14	0	2+2	0	1+2	0	3+1	0
10	MF	(Russia) RUS	Alan Kasaev	45	6	17+13	4	4	1	3	1	3+5	0
15	MF	(Belarus) BLR	Syarhey Kislyak	25	2	12+7	2	2	0	3	0	1	0
18	FW	(Paraguay) PAR	Nelson Valdez	27	6	14+3	3	2	0	0	0	7+1	3
19	DF	(Russia) RUS	Vitali Kaleshin	34	0	18+5	0	3	0	3	0	5	0
20	MF	(Finland) FIN	Alexei Eremenko	7	0	2+2	0	1	0	0	0	0+2	0
21	FW	(Moldova) MDA	Alexandru Antoniuc	3	0	0+2	0	0+1	0	0	0	0	0
23	MF	(Finland) FIN	Roman Eremenko	25	3	21	2	4	1	0	0	0	0
24	GK	(Lithuania) LTU	Giedrius Arlauskis	6	0	3	0	0	0	0	0	2+1	0
25	FW	(Russia) RUS	Vladimir Dyadyun	46	6	20+10	3	4	0	4	2	4+4	1
27	DF	(Italy) ITA	Salvatore Bocchetti	49	6	31+1	5	3+1	1	3	0	10	0
28	FW	(Russia) RUS	Sergei Davydov	14	2	7+4	1	0+3	1	0	0	0	0
30	MF	(Spain) ESP	Jonatan Valle	3	0	0+2	0	0+1	0	0	0	0	0
33	FW	(Russia) RUS	Igor Portnyagin	1	0	0+1	0	0	0	0	0	0	0
61	MF	(Turkey) TUR	Gökdeniz Karadeniz	54	9	28+7	6	4+1	2	4	0	10	1
63	MF	(Russia) RUS	Alisher Dzhalilov	5	0	0+3	0	0+1	0	0+1	0	0	0
65	DF	(Russia) RUS	Maksim Zhestokov	1	0	0+1	0	0	0	0	0	0	0
66	MF	(Israel) ISR	Bibras Natcho	58	14	41	9	3	0	4	2	9+1	3
67	DF	(Georgia (country)) GEO	Solomon Kvirkvelia	14	1	8	1	2	0	4	0	0	0
76	DF	(Russia) RUS	Roman Sharonov	45	1	31+1	1	2	0	4	0	7	0
77	MF	(Russia) RUS	Nikita Bocharov	1	0	0+1	0	0	0	0	0	0	0
92	FW	(Turkmenistan) TKM	Wahyt Orazsähedow	1	0	0+1	0	0	0	0	0	0	0
Players away from the club on loan:
Players who appeared for Rubin Kazan' no longer at the club:
11	FW	(Russia) RUS	Igor Lebedenko	28	3	17+5	2	1	1	1+2	0	2	0
16	MF	(Ecuador) ECU	Christian Noboa	38	6	25	5	0+1	0	4	0	8	1
26	FW	(Russia) RUS	Aleksei Medvedev	28	3	9+12	2	1+1	0	0+4	1	0+1	0
56	MF	(Russia) RUS	Ruslan Makhmutov	1	0	0	0	0+1	0	0	0	0	0

=== Goal scorers ===
Place	Position	Nation	Number	Name	Premier League	Russian Cup	Europa League	Champions League	Total
1	MF	(Israel)	66	Bibras Natcho	9	0	3	2	14
2	MF	(Turkey)	61	Gökdeniz Karadeniz	6	2	1	0	9
3	MF	(Russia)	8	Aleksandr Ryazantsev	7	1	0	0	8
4	MF	(Ecuador)	16	Christian Noboa	5	0	2	0	7
5	DF	(Italy)	27	Salvatore Bocchetti	5	1	0	0	6
5	FW	(Paraguay)	18	Nelson Valdez	3	0	3	0	6
5	FW	(Russia)	25	Vladimir Dyadyun	3	0	1	2	6
8	MF	(Russia)	10	Alan Kasaev	4	0	0	1	5
9	FW	(Russia)	11	Igor Lebedenko	2	1	0	0	3
9	FW	(Russia)	26	Aleksei Medvedev	2	0	0	1	3
11	MF	(Belarus)	15	Syarhey Kislyak	2	0	0	0	2
11	MF	(Finland)	23	Roman Eremenko	2	0	0	0	2
11	MF	(Russia)	10	Alan Kasaev	1	1	0	0	2
11	FW	(Nigeria)	5	Obafemi Martins	0	0	2	0	2
11				Own goal	1	1	0	0	2
16	DF	(Spain)	4	César Navas	1	0	0	0	1
16	DF	(Georgia (country))	67	Solomon Kvirkvelia	1	0	0	0	1
16	DF	(Russia)	76	Roman Sharonov	1	0	0	0	1
16	FW	(Russia)	28	Sergei Davydov	0	1	0	0	1
16	DF	(Argentina)	3	Cristian Ansaldi	0	0	1	0	1
				TOTALS	55	8	13	6	80

=== Disciplinary record ===
Number	Nation	Position	Name	Premier League		Russian Cup		Europa League		Champions League		Total	
Number	Nation	Position	Name	Yellow card	Red card	Yellow card	Red card	Yellow card	Red card	Yellow card	Red card	Yellow card	Red card
1	(Russia)	GK	Sergei Ryzhikov	2	0	0	0	1	1	0	0	3	1
2	(Russia)	DF	Oleg Kuzmin	11	0	0	0	1	0	1	0	13	0
3	(Argentina)	DF	Cristian Ansaldi	8	0	0	0	1	0	0	0	9	0
4	(Spain)	DF	César Navas	11	0	1	0	4	0	0	0	16	0
5	(Nigeria)	FW	Obafemi Martins	0	0	0	0	1	0	0	0	1	0
7	(Russia)	MF	Pyotr Bystrov	2	0	1	0	0	0	0	0	3	0
8	(Russia)	MF	Aleksandr Ryazantsev	3	0	0	0	3	0	0	0	6	0
9	(Russia)	MF	Pyotr Nemov	5	0	0	0	0	0	0	0	5	0
10	(Russia)	MF	Alan Kasaev	0	0	0	0	1	0	0	0	1	0
15	(Belarus)	MF	Syarhey Kislyak	6	0	1	0	0	0	1	0	6	0
16	(Ecuador)	MF	Christian Noboa	3	1	0	0	1	0	0	0	4	1
18	(Paraguay)	FW	Nelson Valdez	4	0	0	0	1	0	0	0	5	0
19	(Russia)	DF	Vitali Kaleshin	4	1	2	1	0	0	0	0	6	2
20	(Finland)	MF	Alexei Eremenko	0	0	0	0	2	0	0	0	2	0
23	(Finland)	MF	Roman Eremenko	0	0	1	0	0	0	0	0	1	0
25	(Russia)	FW	Vladimir Dyadyun	3	0	0	0	1	0	0	0	4	0
27	(Italy)	DF	Salvatore Bocchetti	14	2	0	0	2	0	2	0	18	2
30	(Spain)	MF	Jonatan Valle	0	0	1	0	0	0	0	0	1	0
61	(Turkey)	MF	Gökdeniz Karadeniz	8	0	1	0	3	0	1	0	13	0
63	(Russia)	MF	Alisher Dzhalilov	1	0	0	0	0	0	0	0	1	0
66	(Israel)	MF	Bibras Natcho	6	0	0	0	1	0	0	0	7	0
67	(Georgia (country))	DF	Solomon Kvirkvelia	1	0	0	0	0	0	0	0	1	0
76	(Russia)	DF	Roman Sharonov	10	0	3	1	2	0	0	0	15	1
Players away on loan:
Players who left Rubin Kazan during the season:
11	(Russia)	FW	Igor Lebedenko	0	0	0	0	1	0	0	0	1	0
26	(Russia)	FW	Aleksei Medvedev	0	0	0	0	0	0	1	0	1	0
			TOTALS	102	4	11	2	26	1	6	0	145	7

== Notes ==
Notes

- Note 1: Played in Moscow at Luzhniki Stadium as there was severe cold in Kazan and Rubin Kazan's Central Stadium had a probable frozen pitch. Kickoff also moved to 13:00 CET (15:00 local time) due to cold weather.
- Note 2: Played at the Luzhniki Stadium in Moscow due to the severe cold weather in Kazan, which meant the pitch at Rubin Kazan's Central Stadium would be frozen. Kickoff also moved to 12:00 CET (15:00 local time) due to cold weather.
