= 2012–13 FC Rubin Kazan season =

Rubin
2012–13 season
- Chairman: Alexander Gusev
- Manager: Kurban Berdyev
- Stadium: Tsentralnyi Stadion, Kazan
- Russian Premier League: 6th
- Russian Cup: Round of 32 vs Yenisey Krasnoyarsk
- Russian Super Cup: Winners
- Europa League: Quarter-finals vs Chelsea
- Top goalscorer: League: Bibras Natcho (9); All: Salomón Rondón (12)
- Highest home attendance: 25,000 vs Chelsea; 11 April 2013
- Lowest home attendance: 1,000 vs Levante; 14 March 2013
- Average home league attendance: 7,962
Home colours	Away colours

The 2012–13 Rubin season was the ninth successive season that the club played in the Russian Premier League, the highest tier of association football in Russia. In addition the domestic league, the club competed in this season's editions of the Russian Cup (as title holders), the Russian Super Cup, and the Europa League.

== Squad ==
Note: Flags indicate national team as defined under FIFA eligibility rules; some limited exceptions apply. Players may hold more than one non-FIFA nationality.

No.	Pos.	Nation	Player
1	GK	RUS	Sergei Ryzhikov
2	DF	RUS	Oleg Kuzmin
3	DF	ARG	Cristian Ansaldi
4	DF	ESP	César Navas (vice-captain)
6	MF	ESP	Pablo Orbaiz
8	MF	RUS	Aleksandr Ryazantsev
10	MF	RUS	Alan Kasaev
15	MF	BLR	Sergei Kislyak
19	DF	RUS	Vitali Kaleshin
20	MF	FIN	Alexei Eremenko
22	FW	RUS	Vladimir Dyadyun
23	MF	FIN	Roman Eremenko

No.	Pos.	Nation	Player
24	GK	LTU	Giedrius Arlauskis
25	DF	ESP	Iván Marcano
35	DF	RUS	Ivan Temnikov
55	FW	TUR	Gökhan Töre
61	MF	TUR	Gökdeniz Karadeniz
66	MF	ISR	Bibras Natcho
69	FW	IRI	Sardar Azmoun
76	DF	RUS	Roman Sharonov (captain)
87	DF	AZE	Ruslan Abishov
88	GK	IRI	Alireza Haghighi
90	MF	FRA	Yann M'Vila
99	FW	VEN	Salomón Rondón

=== Out on loan ===
Note: Flags indicate national team as defined under FIFA eligibility rules; some limited exceptions apply. Players may hold more than one non-FIFA nationality.

No.	Pos.	Nation	Player
11	MF	BRA	Carlos Eduardo (at Flamengo until June 2014)
—	MF	UZB	Vagiz Galiulin (at FC Neftekhimik Nizhnekamsk)
—	MF	MDA	Mihail Plătică (at FC Neftekhimik Nizhnekamsk)

No.	Pos.	Nation	Player
—	FW	RUS	Igor Portnyagin (at FC Krylia Sovetov)
—	FW	RUS	Sergei Davydov (at Dynamo Moscow until 5 June 2013)

=== Reserves ===
Note: Flags indicate national team as defined under FIFA eligibility rules; some limited exceptions apply. Players may hold more than one non-FIFA nationality.

No.	Pos.	Nation	Player
12	FW	RUS	Merab Uridia
31	GK	RUS	Aleksei Berezin
34	MF	RUS	Luai Ururu
35	DF	RUS	Viktor Garayev
36	DF	RUS	Yury Savostin
37	DF	RUS	Elmir Nabiullin
38	FW	RUS	Herman Sergeev
43	FW	RUS	Konstantin Vasilyev

No.	Pos.	Nation	Player
44	DF	RUS	Aybar Khabibullin
50	MF	RUS	Parvizdzhon Umarbaev
57	MF	RUS	Nikita Lobanov
58	FW	RUS	Andrei Vshivtsev
68	GK	RUS	Dmitri Volkotrub
77	MF	RUS	Nikita Bocharov
95	MF	RUS	Dmitri Prokopenko

== Transfers ==
=== Summer ===
In: Note: Flags indicate national team as defined under FIFA eligibility rules; some limited exceptions apply. Players may hold more than one non-FIFA nationality.

No.	Pos.	Nation	Player
6	MF	ESP	Pablo Orbaiz (from (Spain) Athletic Bilbao, previously on loan to (Greece) Olympiacos)
16	MF	MDA	Mihail Plătică (from (Moldova) Academia UTM)
25	DF	ESP	Iván Marcano (from (Spain) Villarreal)
35	MF	RUS	Ivan Temnikov (from (Russia) Dynamo Bryansk)
99	FW	VEN	Salomón Rondón (from (Spain) Málaga)

Out: Note: Flags indicate national team as defined under FIFA eligibility rules; some limited exceptions apply. Players may hold more than one non-FIFA nationality.

No.	Pos.	Nation	Player
5	FW	NGR	Obafemi Martins (to (Spain) Levante)
9	MF	RUS	Pyotr Nemov (to (Russia) Krylia Sovetov Samara)
15	DF	BLR	Syarhey Kislyak (on loan to (Russia) Krasnodar)
18	FW	PAR	Nelson Haedo Valdez (on loan to (Spain) Valencia)
30	MF	ESP	Jonatan Valle (to (Spain) Recreativo de Huelva)
42	DF	RUS	Marat Doyati (to (Russia) Shinnik Yaroslavl)
62	DF	GEO	Solomon Kvirkvelia (loan to (Russia) Neftekhimik Nizhnekamsk)
63	MF	RUS	Alisher Dzhalilov (to (Russia) Neftekhimik Nizhnekamsk)
77	MF	RUS	Nikita Bocharov (on loan to (Russia) Neftekhimik Nizhnekamsk)
84	DF	RUS	Iskandar Dzhalilov (to (Russia) Neftekhimik Nizhnekamsk)
92	FW	TKM	Wahyt Orazsähedow (to (Russia) Neftekhimik Nizhnekamsk)
97	FW	RUS	Georgi Nurov (to (Russia) Neftekhimik Nizhnekamsk)
—	GK	RUS	Yuri Nesterenko (to (Russia) Neftekhimik Nizhnekamsk, previously on loan to (Russia) Rubin-2 Kazan)
—	DF	RUS	Aleksandr Kulikov (on loan to (Russia) Neftekhimik Nizhnekamsk, previously on loan to (Russia) Spartak Nalchik)
—	DF	RUS	Anton Piskunov (to (Russia) Neftekhimik Nizhnekamsk, previously on loan to (Russia) KAMAZ Naberezhnye Chelny)
—	DF	RUS	Vitali Ustinov (to (Russia) Neftekhimik Nizhnekamsk, previously on loan)
—	MF	RUS	Yevgeni Balyaikin (to (Russia) Krylia Sovetov Samara, previously on loan to (Russia) Tom Tomsk)
—	MF	UZB	Vagiz Galiullin (to (Russia) Neftekhimik Nizhnekamsk, previously on loan to (Russia) Sibir Novosibirsk)
—	MF	RUS	Aleksei Kotlyarov (to (Russia) Neftekhimik Nizhnekamsk, previously on loan)
—	MF	RUS	Ruslan Makhmutov (to (Russia) Neftekhimik Nizhnekamsk, previously on loan)
—	MF	RUS	Ilsur Samigullin (to (Russia) Neftekhimik Nizhnekamsk, previously on loan)
—	FW	RUS	Roman Adamov (to (Russia) Rostov, previously on loan)
—	FW	RUS	Davron Mirzaev (to (Russia) Neftekhimik Nizhnekamsk, previously on loan)
—	FW	RUS	Igor Portnyagin (on loan to (Russia) Neftekhimik Nizhnekamsk, previously on loan to (Russia) Tom Tomsk)

=== Winter ===
In: Note: Flags indicate national team as defined under FIFA eligibility rules; some limited exceptions apply. Players may hold more than one non-FIFA nationality.

No.	Pos.	Nation	Player
15	MF	BLR	Syarhey Kislyak (end of loan to (Russia) FC Krasnodar)
62	DF	GEO	Solomon Kvirkvelia (loan return from (Russia) Neftekhimik Nizhnekamsk)
69	FW	IRI	Sardar Azmoun (from (Iran) Sepahan)
87	DF	AZE	Ruslan Abishov (from (Azerbaijan) Khazar Lankaran)
90	MF	FRA	Yann M'Vila (from (France) Stade Rennais)
—	FW	RUS	Igor Portnyagin (loan return from (Russia) Neftekhimik Nizhnekamsk)

Out: Note: Flags indicate national team as defined under FIFA eligibility rules; some limited exceptions apply. Players may hold more than one non-FIFA nationality.

No.	Pos.	Nation	Player
7	MF	RUS	Pyotr Bystrov (released)
9	FW	RUS	Sergei Davydov (on loan to (Russia) Dynamo Moscow)
11	MF	BRA	Carlos Eduardo (on loan to (Brazil) Flamengo)
18	FW	PAR	Nelson Valdez (to (Spain) Valencia CF (previously on loan))
27	DF	ITA	Salvatore Bocchetti (to (Russia) Spartak Moscow)
—	FW	RUS	Igor Portnyagin (on loan to (Russia) Krylia Sovetov)

== Competitions ==
=== Russian Premier League ===
==== League table ====
Pos	Team	Pld	W	D	L	GF	GA	GD	Pts	Qualification or relegation
4	Spartak Moscow	30	15	6	9	51	39	+12	51	Qualification to Europa League play-off round
5	Kuban Krasnodar	30	14	9	7	48	28	+20	51	Qualification for the Europa League third qualifying round
6	Rubin Kazan	30	15	5	10	39	27	+12	50	Qualification for the Europa League second qualifying round
7	Dynamo Moscow	30	14	6	10	41	34	+7	48 (Note: Dynamo Moscow ahead of Terek Grozny on head-to-head points; Dynamo Moscow–Terek Grozny 1–2, Terek Grozny–Dynamo Moscow 1–2.)	
8	Terek Grozny	30	14	6	10	38	40	−2	48	

Source: Russian Premier League
Rules for classification: 1) points; 2) number of wins; 3) head-to-head points; 4) number of head-to-head wins; 5) head-to-head goal difference; 6) number of head-to-head goals scored; 7) number of head-to-head away goals scored; 8) goal difference; 9) number of goals scored; 10) number of away goals scored; 11) position in the 2011–12 season (only used until all the regularly scheduled games have been played); 11) extra play-off game or tournament between the teams in question.

==== Matches ====
23 July 2012 1	Krasnodar	2 – 1	Rubin Kazan	Krasnodar, Krasnodar Krai
19:30 MSK (UTC+4)	Movsisyan 41', 61' (pen.)	Summary	Natcho 65' (pen.)	Stadium: Kuban Stadium; Attendance: 12,000; Referee: Alexey Nikolaev

28 July 2012 2	Rubin Kazan	3 – 1	Alania	Kazan, Tatarstan
15:00 MSK (UTC+4)	Natcho 18' (pen.), 48'; Dyadyun 90+3'	Summary	Neco 79' (pen.)	Stadium: Tsentralnyi Stadion; Attendance: 8,450; Referee: Sergei Ivanov

6 August 2012 3	Volga	1 – 2	Rubin Kazan	Nizhny Novgorod, Nizhny Novgorod Oblast
18:00 MSK (UTC+4)	Kharitonov 14'	Summary	Gökdeniz 56'; Eremenko 73'; Bocchetti (red card) 90+4'	Stadium: Lokomotiv Stadium; Attendance: 6,700; Referee: Timur Arslanbekov

12 August 2012 4	Rubin Kazan	2 – 0	Dynamo	Kazan, Tatarstan
19:00 MSK (UTC+4)	Natcho 78'; Eremenko 90+2'	Summary		Stadium: Tsentralnyi Stadion; Attendance: 17,467; Referee: Vladimir Kazmenko

18 August 2012 5	Spartak	2 – 1	Rubin Kazan	Moscow
13:30 MSK (UTC+4)	Rômulo 73'; Kombarov 84' (pen.)	Summary	Natcho 36' (pen.)	Stadium: Luzhniki Stadium; Attendance: 17,976; Referee: Alexey Nikolaev

25 August 2012 6	Zenit	1 – 2	Rubin Kazan	Saint Petersburg
16:00 MSK (UTC+4)	Fayzulin 25'	Summary	Natcho 52' (pen.); Eremenko 61'	Stadium: Petrovsky Stadium; Attendance: 20,500; Referee: Aleksandr Egorov

1 September 2012 7	Rubin Kazan	1 – 2	Terek	Kazan, Tatarstan
14:00 MSK (UTC+4)	Rondón 68'; Bocchetti (yellow card) 84' (yellow-red card) 89'	Summary	Ndouassel 13'; Mitrishev 85'	Stadium: Tsentralnyi Stadion; Attendance: 9,277; Referee: Maxim Layushkin

15 September 2012 8	Lokomotiv	1 – 0	Rubin Kazan	Moscow
13:30 MSK (UTC+4)	Tarasov 52'	Summary	Ansaldi (yellow card) 10' (yellow-red card) 44'	Stadium: Lokomotiv Stadium; Attendance: 11,408; Referee: Sergey Karasev

23 September 2012 9	Rubin Kazan	1 – 0	Kuban Krasnodar	Kazan, Tatarstan
19:00 MSK (UTC+4)	Töre (red card) 38'; Bocchetti 45+1'	Summary	Dealbert (red card) 34'	Stadium: Tsentralnyi Stadion; Attendance: 7,850; Referee: Aleksey Eskov

30 September 2012 10	Rostov	0 – 4	Rubin Kazan	Rostov-on-Don, Rostov Oblast
18:30 MSK (UTC+4)	Saláta (red card) 52'	Summary	Rondón 18', 31'; Bocchetti 81'; Dyadyun 90+4'	Stadium: Olimp – 2 Attendance: 11,740; Referee: Eduard Malyi

6 October 2012 11	Rubin Kazan	0 – 1	Amkar	Kazan, Tatarstan
15:45 MSK (UTC+4)		Summary	Ignatovich 3'; Sirakov (yellow card) 89' (yellow-red card) 90+2'	Stadium: Tsentralnyi Stadion; Attendance: 6,450; Referee: Vladislav Bezborodov

21 October 2012 12	CSKA	2 – 0	Rubin Kazan	Moscow
15:15 MSK (UTC+4)	Elm 69' (pen.); Musa 82'	Summary	Marcano (yellow card) 68' (red card) 72'	Stadium: Luzhniki Stadium; Attendance: 8,764; Referee: Alexsandr Egorov

28 October 2012 13	Rubin Kazan	2 – 1	Anzhi	Kazan, Tatarstan
18:30 MSK (UTC+4)	Kuzmin 5'; Kasaev 19'	Summary	Traoré 10'	Stadium: Tsentralnyi Stadion; Attendance: 8,181; Referee: Timur Arslanbekov

3 November 2012 14	Mordovia	1 – 3	Rubin Kazan	Saransk
18:00 MSK (UTC+4)	Panchenko 48'	Summary	Dyadyun 10', 75'; Rondón 90'	Stadium: Start Stadium; Attendance: 4,500; Referee: Sergey Lapochkin

11 November 2012 15	Rubin Kazan	2 – 0	Krylia	Kazan, Tatarstan
15:45 MSK (UTC+4)	Sharonov 6'; Natcho 84' (pen.); Kuzmin (yellow card) 89' (yellow-red card) 90+4'	Summary		Stadium: Tsentralnyi Stadion; Attendance: 6,392; Referee: Aleksey Eskov

17 November 2012 16	Alania	0 – 2	Rubin Kazan	Vladikavkaz
18:30 MSK (UTC+4)		Summary	Marcano 57'; Kasaev 62'	Stadium: Republican Spartak Stadium; Attendance: 8,200; Referee: Sergey Karasev

26 November 2012 17	Rubin Kazan	0 – 0	Volga	Kazan, Tatarstan
17:45 MSK (UTC+4)		Summary	Sapogov (red card) 87'	Stadium: Tsentralnyi Stadion; Attendance: 5,701; Referee: Sergei Ivanov

1 December 2012 18	Dynamo	3 – 0	Rubin Kazan	Moscow
13:30 MSK (UTC+4)	Yusupov 20'; Dzsudzsák 30'; Kurányi 70'	Summary		Stadium: Arena Khimki; Attendance: 0 Referee: Aleksey Eskov

8 December 2012 19	Rubin Kazan	0 – 1	Spartak	Kazan, Tatarstan
17:45 MSK (UTC+4)		Summary	McGeady 60'	Stadium: Tsentralnyi Stadion; Attendance: 8,384; Referee: Vladislav Bezborodov

10 March 2013 20	Rubin Kazan	1 – 0	Zenit	Kazan, Tatarstan
16:00 MSK (UTC+4)	Neto 30' (o.g.)	Summary		Stadium: Tsentralnyi Stadion; Attendance: 16,500; Referee: Timur Arslanbekov

17 March 2013 21	Terek	0 – 0	Rubin Kazan	Grozny, Chechnya
18:00 MSK (UTC+4)	Utsiyev (yellow card) 58' (yellow-red card) 87'	Summary		Stadium: Sultan Bilimkhanov Stadium; Attendance: 24,000; Referee: Mikhail Vilkov

30 March 2013 22	Rubin Kazan	2 – 0	Lokomotiv	Kazan, Tatarstan
13:30 MSK (UTC+4)	Natcho 40'; Dyadyun 87'	Summary		Stadium: Tsentralnyi Stadion; Attendance: 6,649; Referee: Vladimir Kazmenko

7 April 2013 23	Kuban	0 – 0	Rubin Kazan	Krasnodar, Krasnodar Krai
18:30 MSK (UTC+4)		Summary		Stadium: Kuban Stadium; Attendance: 26,494; Referee: Sergey Karasev

14 April 2013 24	Rubin Kazan	1 – 1	Rostov	Kazan, Tatarstan
19:00 MSK (UTC+4)	Gökdeniz 78'	Summary	Poloz 64'	Stadium: Tsentralnyi Stadion; Attendance: 8,200; Referee: Aleksei Matyunin

19 April 2013 25	Amkar	1 – 1	Rubin Kazan	Perm, Perm Krai
17:00 MSK (UTC+4)	Kanunnikov 84'	Summary	Rondón 26'	Stadium: Zvezda Stadium; Attendance: 11,500; Referee: Alexey Nikolaev

28 April 2013 26	Rubin Kazan	2 – 0	CSKA	Kazan, Tatarstan
18:30 MSK (UTC+4)	Rondón 49'; Eremenko 81'	Summary		Stadium: Central Stadium; Attendance: 15,710; Referee: Vitali Meshkov

4 May 2013 27	Anzhi	2 – 1	Rubin Kazan	Makhachkala, Dagestan
18:00 MSK (UTC+4)	Traoré 86'; Eto'o 90'	Summary	Eremenko 82'	Stadium: Dynamo Stadium; Attendance: 21,000; Referee: Vladimir Kazmenko

10 May 2013 28	Rubin Kazan	2 – 1	Mordovia	Kazan, Tatarstan
17:30 MSK (UTC+4)	Gökdeniz 7'; Dyadyun 75'	Summary	Mukhametshin 40'	Stadium: Tsentralnyi Stadion; Attendance: 6,989; Referee: Timur Arslanbekov

19 May 2013 29	Krylia	3 – 1	Rubin Kazan	Samara, Samara Oblast
16:00 MSK (UTC+4)	Caballero 11'; Maksimov 50', 90+2'	Summary	Dyadyun 72'	Stadium: Metallurg Stadium; Attendance: 26,345; Referee: Sergey Lapochkin

26 May 2013 30	Rubin Kazan	2 – 0	Krasnodar	Kazan, Tatarstan
13:30 MSK (UTC+4)	Eremenko 7'; Natcho 64'	Summary		Stadium: Tsentralnyi Stadion; Attendance: 6,120; Referee: Aleksandr Egorov

=== Russian Cup ===
26 September 2012 Round of 32	Yenisey Krasnoyarsk	2 – 1	Rubin Kazan	Krasnoyarsk
14:30 MSK (UTC+4)	Sitdikov 19'; Nikitin 29'	Summary	Davydov 90+3'	Stadium: Central Stadium; Attendance: 12,300; Referee: Vasiliy Kazartsev

=== Russian Super Cup ===
14 July 2012	Zenit Saint Petersburg	0–2	Rubin Kazan	Samara
16:00		Report	Bocchetti 28'; Dyadyun 38'	Stadium: Metallurg; Attendance: 16,284; Referee: Sergei Karasyov (Moscow)

=== UEFA Europa League ===
==== Group stage ====
Pos	Team	Pld	W	D	L	GF	GA	GD	Pts	Qualification
1	(Russia) Rubin Kazan	6	4	2	0	10	3	+7	14	Advance to knockout phase
2	(Italy) Internazionale	6	3	2	1	11	9	+2	11	Advance to knockout phase
3	(Serbia) Partizan	6	0	3	3	3	8	−5	3 (Note: Tied on head-to-head points (2) and head-to-head goal difference (0). Head-to-head away goals: Partizan 1, Neftçi 0.)	
4	(Azerbaijan) Neftçi	6	0	3	3	4	8	−4	3	

Source: Soccerway
Notes:

20 September 2012 1	Internazionale (Italy)	2 – 2	(Russia) Rubin Kazan	Milan, Italy
23:00 MSK (UTC+4)	Livaja 39'; Nagatomo 90+2'	Report	Ryazantsev 17'; Rondón 84'	Stadium: San Siro; Attendance: 28,472; Referee: Deniz Aytekin (Germany)

4 October 2012 2	Rubin Kazan (Russia)	2 – 0	(Serbia) Partizan	Kazan, Russia
20:00 MSK (UTC+4)	Gökdeniz 45'; Ryazantsev 48'	Report		Stadium: Tsentralnyi Stadion; Attendance: 10,443; Referee: Anastassios Kakos (Greece)

25 October 2012 3	Rubin Kazan (Russia)	1 – 0	(Azerbaijan) Neftchi Baku	Kazan, Russia
20:00 MSK (UTC+4)	Kasaev 16'	Report		Stadium: Tsentralnyi Stadion; Attendance: 6,084; Referee: Kenn Hansen (Denmark)

8 November 2012 4	Neftchi Baku (Azerbaijan)	0 – 1	(Russia) Rubin Kazan	Baku, Azerbaijan
21:00 MSK (UTC+4)		Report	Dyadyun 16'	Stadium: Dalga Arena^{1} Attendance: 17,000; Referee: Jorge Sousa (Portugal)

22 November 2012 5	Rubin Kazan (Russia)	3 – 0	(Italy) Internazionale	Kazan, Russia
21:00 MSK (UTC+4)	Gökdeniz 2'; Rondón 82', 90+2'	Report		Stadium: Tsentralnyi Stadion; Attendance: 12,348; Referee: Tommy Skjerven (Norway)

6 December 2012 6	Partizan (Serbia)	1 – 1	(Russia) Rubin Kazan	Belgrade, Serbia
00:05 MSK (UTC+4)	S. Marković 53'	Report	Rondón 59'	Stadium: Partizan Stadium; Attendance: 29,087; Referee: Martin Strömbergsson (Sweden)

Notes

- Note 1: Neftçi played their home match at Dalga Arena, Baku as their own Ismat Gayibov Stadium did not meet UEFA criteria.

==== Knockout phase ====
===== Round of 32 =====
14 February 2013 First leg	Atlético Madrid (Spain)	0 – 2	(Russia) Rubin Kazan	Madrid, Spain
00:05 MSK (UTC+4)		Report	Sharonov (yellow card) 15' (yellow-red card) 45'; Gökdeniz 6'; Orbaiz 90+5'	Stadium: Vicente Calderón Stadium; Attendance: 25,000; Referee: István Vad (Hungary)

21 February 2013 Second leg	Rubin Kazan (Russia)	0 – 1 (2 – 1 agg.)	(Spain) Atlético Madrid	Moscow^{1}, Russia
21:00 MSK (UTC+4)	Navas (red card) 89'	Report	Falcao 84'	Stadium: Luzhniki Stadium; Attendance: 3,000; Referee: Ovidiu Haţegan (Romania)

===== Round of 16 =====
8 March 2013 First leg	Levante (Spain)	0 – 0	(Russia) Rubin Kazan	Valencia, Spain
00:05 MSK (UTC+4)	Míchel (red card) 54'	Report	Ansaldi (yellow card) 27' (yellow-red card) 52'	Stadium: Estadi Ciutat de València; Attendance: 18,000; Referee: Antony Gautier (France)

14 March 2013 Second leg	Rubin Kazan (Russia)	2 – 0 (a.e.t.) (2 – 0 agg.)	(Spain) Levante	Moscow^{1}, Russia
21:00 MSK (UTC+4)	Rondón 100'; Dyadyun 112'	Report		Stadium: Luzhniki Stadium; Attendance: 1,000; Referee: Aleksandar Stavrev (Macedonia)

===== Quarter-finals =====
4 April 2013 First leg	Chelsea (England)	3 – 1	(Russia) Rubin Kazan	London, England
23:05 MSK (UTC+4)	Torres 16', 70'; Moses 32'	Report	Natcho 41' (pen.)	Stadium: Stamford Bridge; Attendance: 32,994; Referee: Gianluca Rocchi (Italy)

11 April 2013 Second leg	Rubin Kazan (Russia)	3 – 2 (4 – 5 agg.)	(England) Chelsea	Moscow^{1}, Russia
17:00 MSK (UTC+4)	Marcano 51'; Gökdeniz 62'; Natcho 75' (pen.)	Report	Torres 5'; Moses 55'	Stadium: Luzhniki Stadium; Attendance: 25,000; Referee: Fırat Aydınus (Turkey)

Notes

- Note 1: Rubin Kazan played their home match at Luzhniki Stadium, Moscow instead of their regular stadium, Tsentralnyi Stadion, Kazan.

== Squad statistics ==
As of match played 28 May 2013

=== Appearances ===
No.	Pos	Nat	Player	Total		Premier League		Russian Cup		Super Cup		Europa League	
No.	Pos	Nat	Player	Apps	Goals	Apps	Goals	Apps	Goals	Apps	Goals	Apps	Goals
1	GK	(Russia) RUS	Sergei Ryzhikov	41	0	29	0	1	0	1	0	10	0
2	DF	(Russia) RUS	Oleg Kuzmin	37	1	25+1	1	0	0	1	0	9+1	0
3	DF	(Argentina) ARG	Cristian Ansaldi	34	0	24+1	0	0	0	1	0	8	0
4	DF	(Spain) ESP	César Navas	28	0	21	0	0	0	1	0	6	0
6	MF	(Spain) ESP	Pablo Orbaiz	35	1	20+3	0	1	0	0	0	10+1	1
8	MF	(Russia) RUS	Aleksandr Ryazantsev	22	2	16+3	0	0	0	0	0	2+1	2
10	MF	(Russia) RUS	Alan Kasaev	30	3	11+9	2	1	0	0	0	6+3	1
15	MF	(Belarus) BLR	Syarhey Kislyak	5	0	0+2	0	0	0	0	0	2+1	0
19	DF	(Russia) RUS	Vitali Kaleshin	20	0	10+1	0	1	0	0+1	0	4+3	0
20	MF	(Finland) FIN	Alexei Eremenko	4	0	1+2	0	0	0	0	0	0+1	0
22	FW	(Russia) RUS	Vladimir Dyadyun	32	9	12+11	6	1	0	1	1	3+4	2
23	MF	(Finland) FIN	Roman Eremenko	36	6	23+2	6	0+1	0	1	0	8+1	0
24	GK	(Lithuania) LTU	Giedrius Arlauskis	3	0	1+1	0	0	0	0	0	1	0
25	DF	(Spain) ESP	Iván Marcano	32	1	20+1	1	1	0	0+1	0	9	0
35	DF	(Russia) RUS	Ivan Temnikov	2	0	0+1	0	1	0	0	0	0	0
50	MF	(Russia) RUS	Parvizdzhon Umarbayev	1	0	0	0	0+1	0	0	0	0	0
55	MF	(Turkey) TUR	Gökhan Töre	7	0	2+3	0	0	0	0	0	0+2	0
61	MF	(Turkey) TUR	Gökdeniz Karadeniz	41	6	23+5	3	1	0	1	0	11	3
62	DF	(Georgia (country)) GEO	Solomon Kvirkvelia	3	0	3	0	0	0	0	0	0	0
66	MF	(Israel) ISR	Bibras Natcho	40	10	30	9	0	0	0	0	10	1
76	DF	(Russia) RUS	Roman Sharonov	24	1	12+3	1	1	0	1	0	7	0
87	DF	(Azerbaijan) AZE	Ruslan Abışov	1	0	1	0	0	0	0	0	0	0
90	MF	(France) FRA	Yann M'Vila	5	0	5	0	0	0	0	0	0	0
99	FW	(Venezuela) VEN	Salomón Rondón	36	12	20+5	7	0	0	0	0	9+2	5
Players away from the club on loan:
9	FW	(Russia) RUS	Sergei Davydov	13	1	1+8	0	1	1	0	0	0+3	0
11	MF	(Brazil) BRA	Carlos Eduardo	5	0	2	0	0	0	0	0	1+2	0
Players who left Rubin Kazan during the season:
5	FW	(Nigeria) NGR	Obafemi Martins	1	0	0	0	0	0	1	0	0	0
7	MF	(Russia) RUS	Pyotr Bystrov	5	0	3+2	0	0	0	0	0	0	0
18	FW	(Paraguay) PAR	Nelson Valdez	4	0	2+1	0	0	0	0+1	0	0	0
27	DF	(Italy) ITA	Salvatore Bocchetti	19	3	13	2	1	0	1	1	4	0

=== Goal scorers ===
Place	Position	Nation	Number	Name	Premier League	Russian Cup	Super Cup	Europa League	Total
1	FW	(Venezuela)	99	Salomón Rondón	7	0	0	5	12
2	MF	(Israel)	66	Bibras Natcho	9	0	0	1	10
3	FW	(Russia)	22	Vladimir Dyadyun	6	0	1	2	8
4	MF	(Finland)	23	Roman Eremenko	6	0	0	0	6
4	MF	(Turkey)	61	Gökdeniz Karadeniz	3	0	0	3	6
6	MF	(Russia)	10	Alan Kasaev	2	0	0	1	3
7	DF	(Italy)	27	Salvatore Bocchetti	2	0	1	0	3
7	MF	(Russia)	8	Aleksandr Ryazantsev	0	0	0	2	2
9	FW	(Russia)	22	Vladimir Dyadyun	1	0	0	0	1
9	DF	(Russia)	2	Oleg Kuzmin	1	0	0	0	1
9	DF	(Russia)	76	Roman Sharonov	1	0	0	0	1
9	DF	(Spain)	25	Iván Marcano	1	0	0	0	1
9	FW	(Russia)	9	Sergei Davydov	0	1	0	0	1
9	DF	(Spain)	6	Pablo Orbaiz	0	0	0	1	1
9				Own goal	1	0	0	0	1
				TOTALS	40	1	2	15	58

=== Clean sheets ===
Place	Position	Nation	Number	Name	Premier League	Russian Cup	Super Cup	Europa League	Total
1	GK	(Russia)	22	Sergei Ryzhikov	12	0	1	7	8
				TOTALS	12	0	1	7	20

=== Disciplinary record ===
Number	Nation	Position	Name	Premier League		Russian Cup		Super Cup		Europa League		Total	
Number	Nation	Position	Name	Yellow card	Red card	Yellow card	Red card	Yellow card	Red card	Yellow card	Red card	Yellow card	Red card
1	(Russia)	GK	Sergei Ryzhikov	1	0	0	0	2	0	3	0		
2	(Russia)	DF	Oleg Kuzmin	8	1	0	0	0	0	2	0	10	1
3	(Argentina)	DF	Cristian Ansaldi	8	1	0	0	1	0	4	1	13	2
4	(Spain)	DF	César Navas	3	0	0	0	0	0	0	1	3	1
6	(Spain)	MF	Pablo Orbaiz	2	0	0	0	0	0	2	0	4	0
8	(Russia)	MF	Aleksandr Ryazantsev	1	0	0	0	0	0	0	0	1	0
10	(Russia)	MF	Alan Kasaev	1	0	0	0	0	0	0	0	1	0
15	(Belarus)	MF	Syarhey Kislyak	1	0	0	0	0	0	0	0	1	0
19	(Russia)	DF	Vitali Kaleshin	1	0	0	0	0	0	1	0	2	0
22	(Russia)	FW	Vladimir Dyadyun	0	0	0	0	0	0	2	0	2	0
23	(Finland)	MF	Roman Eremenko	2	0	0	0	0	0	2	0	4	0
25	(Spain)	DF	Iván Marcano	6	1	1	0	0	0	3	0	10	1
55	(Turkey)	FW	Gökhan Töre	0	1	0	0	0	0	0	0	0	1
61	(Turkey)	MF	Gökdeniz Karadeniz	2	0	0	0	0	0	0	0	2	0
62	(Georgia (country))	MF	Solomon Kvirkvelia	1	0	0	0	0	0	0	0	1	0
66	(Israel)	MF	Bibras Natcho	3	0	0	0	0	0	2	0	5	0
76	(Russia)	DF	Roman Sharonov	1	0	0	0	0	0	4	1	5	1
99	(Venezuela)	FW	Salomón Rondón	4	0	0	0	0	0	0	0	4	0
Players who left Rubin Kazan during the season:
5	(Nigeria)	FW	Obafemi Martins	0	0	0	0	1	0	0	0	1	0
18	(Paraguay)	FW	Nelson Valdez	1	0	0	0	0	0	0	0	1	0
27	(Italy)	DF	Salvatore Bocchetti	2	2	1	0	1	0	1	0	5	2
			TOTALS	48	6	2	0	3	0	25	3	78	9
