= Cristian Ansaldi =

Argentine footballer (born 1986)

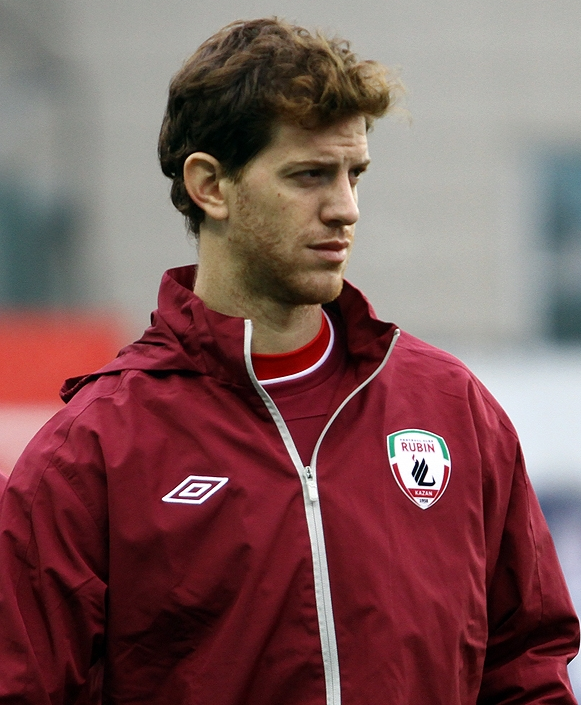
- Ansaldi with Rubin Kazan in 2012

Personal information
- Full name: Cristian Daniel Ansaldi
- Date of birth: 20 September 1986 (age 40)
- Place of birth: Rosario, Argentina
- Height: 1.81 m (5 ft 11 in)
- Position: Full-back

Senior career*
| Years | Team | Apps | (Gls) |
| 2005–2008 | Newell's Old Boys | 29 | (2) |
| 2008–2013 | Rubin Kazan | 128 | (2) |
| 2013–2016 | Zenit Saint Petersburg | 9 | (1) |
| 2014–2015 | → Atlético Madrid (loan) | 7 | (0) |
| 2015–2016 | → Genoa (loan) | 24 | (0) |
| 2016–2017 | Inter Milan | 21 | (0) |
| 2017–2022 | Torino | 126 | (9) |
| 2022–2024 | Parma | 37 | (1) |

International career^{‡}
| 2009–2018 | Argentina | 5 | (1) |
- * Club domestic league appearances and goals as of 9 June 2024 ‡ National team caps and goals as of 18 November 2014

Cristian Daniel Ansaldi (born 20 September 1986) is an Argentine former professional footballer who played as a full-back. He had been capped five times with the Argentina national team.

A defender who plays with both feet, he is equally at ease as a right or left back. Although dribbling mostly with his right foot, he prefers to shoot with his left.

== Club career ==
=== Newell's Old Boys ===
Born in Rosario, Ansaldi started his professional career in 2005 and quickly progressed to become a regular player in the Newell's Old Boys first team.

=== Rubin Kazan ===
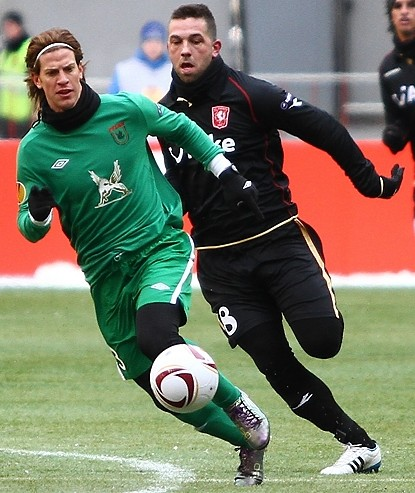
Ansaldi (left) with Rubin Kazan, chased down by Theo Janssen (right) of Twente, February 2011.

In January 2008, he was sold to Rubin Kazan, with whom he won the Russian Premier League in 2008 and 2009.

=== Zenit ===
Ansaldi left Rubin Kazan for Zenit Saint Petersburg in 2013.

==== Atlético (loan) ====
On 1 August 2014, he went on loan to Atlético Madrid for the upcoming La Liga season. Nine days later, his hip collided with the head of teammate Mario Suárez in a friendly at VfL Wolfsburg, causing to the latter a brain injury.

He made his competitive debut in the first leg of the 2014 Supercopa de España on 19 August, a 1–1 draw away to Real Madrid, in which he came on after 64 minutes for fellow debutant Guilherme Siqueira.

=== Genoa ===
Ansaldi went on loan to Genoa for the 2015–16 season, the loan contract included the buyout option. The transfer was made permanent on 31 May 2016 when the club activated the €4 million clause.

On 22 June 2016, Ansaldi agreed on a contract with Internazionale, under the assumption that Genoa would trigger the buyout option in the loan contract, and sell him on to Inter. However, Genoa did not make the payment to Zenit St. Petersburg by the deadline of 30 June 2016 and the player rights reverted to Zenit, as his Zenit contract was valid until the summer of 2017. Despite this unexpected outcome, Ansaldi still represented Inter against WSG Wattens on 9 July 2016, the first pre-season friendly. He was included in the pre-season tour in the US. On 29 July, Zenit announced that they finalised the transfer deal with Genoa.

=== Inter Milan ===
On 30 July 2016, Ansaldi joined Inter Milan on a permanent deal from Genoa, with Diego Laxalt moved to opposite direction. He suffered a ligament injury shortly after joining which kept him out for several weeks. Ansaldi played his first game for the team on 29 September 2016 in a 3–1 loss against Sparta Prague in the first match of 2016–17 UEFA Europa League Group K. Ansaldi concluded his first Internazionale season by making 26 appearances in all competitions, including 21 in league. He was sent off during the match against Palermo, provided his first and only assist in the 2–2 draw at Torino.

Ansaldi was an unused substitute in Inter's first two 2017–18 Serie A matches before joining Torino on loan.

=== Torino ===
On 31 August 2017, Ansaldi joined Torino on a two-year loan deal, with the agreement including an obligation to buy the player permanently. He made his debut for Torino on 20 September 2017, away against Udinese, won 3–2. He scored his first goal for the club on 31 March 2018, in a 4–0 win against Cagliari.

=== Parma ===
On 22 August 2022, Italian Serie B club Parma announced the signing of Ansaldi on a permanent deal.

On 15 October 2024, in an interview with a media, Ansaldi announced that he had retired from professional football.

== International career ==
Ansaldi was called for Argentina on 14 November 2009, for a friendly game against Spain.

In May 2018 he was named in Argentina's 23 man squad for the 2018 World Cup in Russia.

== Career statistics ==
=== Club ===
As of match played 20 May 2022.

| Club | Season | League | | | Cup | | Continental | | Other | | Total | |
| Club | Season | Division | Apps | Goals | Apps | Goals | Apps | Goals | Apps | Goals | Apps | Goals |
|---|---|---|---|---|---|---|---|---|---|---|---|---|
| Newell's Old Boys | 2005–06 | Argentine Primera División | 7 | 0 | 0 | 0 | 0 | 0 | – | | 7 | 0 |
| Newell's Old Boys | 2006–07 | Argentine Primera División | 9 | 2 | 0 | 0 | 0 | 0 | – | | 9 | 2 |
| Newell's Old Boys | 2007–08 | Argentine Primera División | 12 | 0 | 0 | 0 | 0 | 0 | – | | 12 | 0 |
| Newell's Old Boys | Total | | 28 | 2 | 0 | 0 | 0 | 0 | 0 | 0 | 28 | 2 |
| Rubin Kazan | 2008 | Russian Premier League | 27 | 1 | 1 | 0 | – | | – | | 28 | 1 |
| Rubin Kazan | 2009 | Russian Premier League | 25 | 1 | 2 | 0 | 5 | 0 | – | | 32 | 1 |
| Rubin Kazan | 2010 | Russian Premier League | 20 | 0 | 0 | 0 | 10 | 0 | 1 (Note: Appearance in Russian Super Cup) | 0 | 31 | 0 |
| Rubin Kazan | 2011–12 | Russian Premier League | 27 | 0 | 3 | 0 | 8 | 1 | – | | 38 | 1 |
| Rubin Kazan | 2012–13 | Russian Premier League | 25 | 0 | 0 | 0 | 9 | 0 | 1 | 0 | 35 | 0 |
| Rubin Kazan | 2013–14 | Russian Premier League | 4 | 0 | 0 | 0 | 2 | 0 | – | | 6 | 0 |
| Rubin Kazan | Total | | 128 | 2 | 6 | 0 | 34 | 1 | 2 | 0 | 170 | 3 |
| Zenit Saint Petersburg | 2013–14 | Russian Premier League | 9 | 1 | 0 | 0 | 4 | 0 | – | | 13 | 1 |
| Atlético Madrid (loan) | 2014–15 | La Liga | 7 | 0 | 0 | 0 | 3 | 0 | 1 (Note: Appearance in Supercopa de España) | 0 | 11 | 0 |
| Zenit Saint Petersburg | 2015–16 | Russian Premier League | 0 | 0 | 0 | 0 | 0 | 0 | 1 (Note: One appearance in the Russian Super Cup) | 0 | 1 | 0 |
| Zenit Saint Petersburg | Total (2 spells) | | 9 | 1 | 0 | 0 | 4 | 0 | 1 | 0 | 14 | 1 |
| Genoa (loan) | 2015–16 | Serie A | 24 | 0 | 1 | 0 | – | | – | | 25 | 0 |
| Internazionale | 2016–17 | Serie A | 21 | 0 | 2 | 0 | 3 | 0 | – | | 26 | 0 |
| Torino | 2017–18 | Serie A | 25 | 1 | 0 | 0 | – | | – | | 25 | 1 |
| Torino | 2018–19 | Serie A | 24 | 3 | 0 | 0 | – | | – | | 24 | 3 |
| Torino | 2019–20 | Serie A | 27 | 4 | 0 | 0 | 5 | 1 | – | | 32 | 5 |
| Torino | 2020–21 | Serie A | 31 | 1 | 3 | 0 | 0 | 0 | – | | 34 | 1 |
| Torino | 2021–22 | Serie A | 19 | 0 | 1 | 0 | – | | – | | 20 | 0 |
| Torino | Total | | 126 | 9 | 4 | 0 | 5 | 1 | 0 | 0 | 135 | 10 |
| Career total | | | 343 | 14 | 13 | 0 | 49 | 2 | 4 | 0 | 409 | 16 |

=== International ===
As of 18 November 2014

Appearances and goals by national team and year
| National team | Year | Apps | Goals |
|---|---|---|---|
Argentina
| Argentina | 2009 | 1 | 0 |
| Argentina | 2011 | 1 | 0 |
| Argentina | 2013 | 1 | 0 |
| Argentina | 2014 | 2 | 1 |
| Total | | 5 | 1 |

International goals by date, venue, cap, opponent, score, result and competition
| No. | Date | Venue | Cap | Opponent | Score | Result | Competition |
|---|---|---|---|---|---|---|---|
| 1 | 12 November 2014 | Boleyn Ground, London, England | 4 | Croatia | 1–1 | 2–1 | Friendly |

== Honours ==
Rubin Kazan

- Russian Premier League: 2008, 2009
- Russian Super Cup: 2010, 2012
- Russian Cup: 2011–12

Atlético Madrid

- Supercopa de España: 2014

Zenit Saint Petersburg

- Russian Super Cup: 2015

Parma

- Serie B: 2023–24
