= Roman Sharonov =

Russian footballer

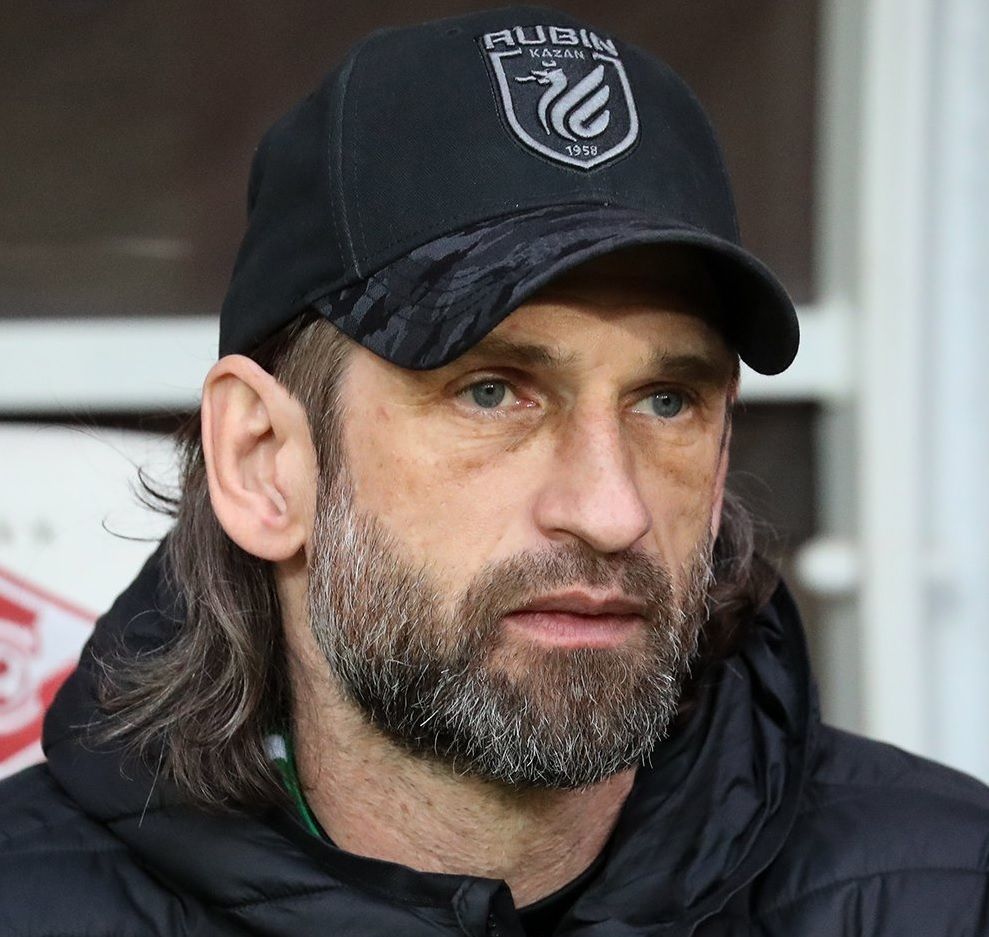
- Sharonov coaching Rubin Kazan in 2019

Personal information
- Full name: Roman Sergeyevich Sharonov
- Date of birth: 8 September 1976 (age 50)
- Place of birth: Mytishchi, Russian SFSR
- Height: 1.84 m (6 ft 1/2 in)
- Position: Centre back

Team information
- Current team: Akhmat Grozny (assistant coach)

Youth career
- Lokomotiv Moscow

Senior career*
Years	Team	Apps	(Gls)
1993–1997	Lokomotiv-d Moscow	118	(1)
1997	Shanghai Fubao		
1997–1999	Metallurg Krasnoyarsk	75	(5)
1999–2004	Rubin Kazan	146	(5)
2005–2006	Terek Grozny	58	(1)
2007	Shinnik Yaroslavl	34	(0)
2008–2014	Rubin Kazan	102	(5)
Total		533	(17)

International career
2004–2012	Russia	8	(0)

Managerial career
- 2017–2019: Rubin Kazan (U-21)
- 2019: Rubin Kazan (caretaker)
- 2020–2021: Pafos (assistant)
- 2022–2024: SKA-Khabarovsk
- 2026: Dynamo Moscow (assistant)
- 2026–: Akhmat Grozny (assistant)
- * Club domestic league appearances and goals

Roman Sergeyevich Sharonov (Russian: Роман Серге́евич Шаронов; born 8 September 1976) is a Russian football coach and a former player who played as a right back. He is an assistant coach with Akhmat Grozny.

== Club career ==
He played most of his career for Rubin Kazan.

== International career ==
He played for the country at Euro 2004, receiving a red card during the 1–0 defeat by Spain.

== Coaching career ==
On 6 June 2019, he was appointed caretaker manager of Rubin Kazan. As he did not possess the necessary UEFA Pro Licence at the time, but rather UEFA A Licence, he was formally registered with the league as an assistant coach, with Spanish coach Eduardo Aldama Docampo registered as the de jure head coach. He left Rubin by mutual consent on 16 December 2019, with the team in 13th place in the table.

On 6 June 2022, Sharonov was hired as manager of SKA-Khabarovsk on a two-year deal.

On 10 January 2026, Sharonov was hired by Dynamo Moscow as an assistant coach to Rolan Gusev.

== Career statistics ==
=== Club ===
Club	Season	League		Cup		Europe		Total
Club	Season	Game	Goals	Game	Goals	Game	Goals	Game	Goals
Rubin Kazan	1999	32	0	0	0	-	-	32	0
Rubin Kazan	2000	23	3	0	0	-	-	23	3
Rubin Kazan	2001	31	0	0	0	-	-	31	0
Rubin Kazan	2002	30	1	1	0	-	-	31	1
Rubin Kazan	2003	18	1	1	0	-	-	19	1
Rubin Kazan	2004	23	0	3	0	2	0	28	0
Rubin Kazan	Total	157	5	5	0	2	0	164	5
Terek Grozny	2005	21	0	3	0	0	0	24	0
Terek Grozny	2006	37	1	4	0	-	-	41	1
Terek Grozny	Total	58	1	7	0	-	-	65	1
Shinnik Yaroslavl	2007	34	0	0	0	-	-	34	0
Shinnik Yaroslavl	Total	34	0	0	0	-	-	34	0
Rubin Kazan	2008	26	1	0	0	-	-	26	1
Rubin Kazan	2009	25	2	4	0	5	0	34	2
Rubin Kazan	2010	2	0	0	0	0	0	2	0
Rubin Kazan	2011–12	32	1	1	0	11	0	44	1
Rubin Kazan	2012–13	15	1	2	0	10	0	27	1
Rubin Kazan	2013–14	2	0	1	0	8	0	11	0
Rubin Kazan	Total	102	5	8	0	34	0	144	5
Career Total		351	11	20	0	36	0	407	11

=== International ===
Russia national team
Year	Apps	Goals
2004	7	0
2012	1	0
Total	8	0

Statistics accurate as of match played 25 May 2012
