= Solomon Kvirkvelia =

Georgian footballer

Saba Kvirkvelia
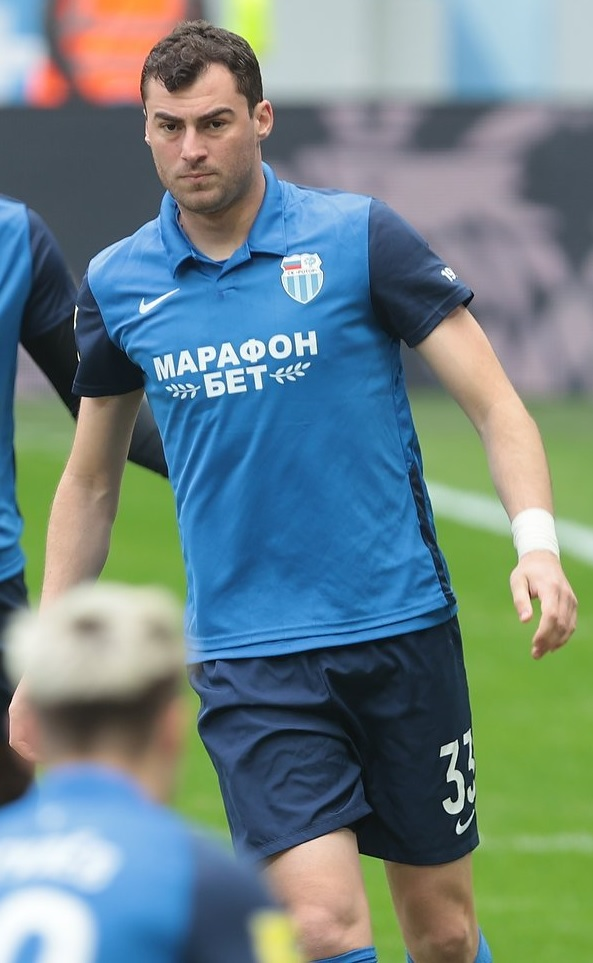
- Kvirkvelia with Rotor Volgograd in 2021

Personal information
- Date of birth: 6 February 1992 (age 34)
- Place of birth: Samtredia, Georgia
- Height: 1.96 m (6 ft 5 in)
- Position: Centre-back

Team information
- Current team: Toktogul
- Number: 33

Youth career
- Gloria Samtredia
- 2005–: Dinamo Tbilisi
- Tengiz Sulakvelidze Academy Tbilisi
- 2009–2010: Zenit Saint Petersburg

Senior career*
Years	Team	Apps	(Gls)
2010–2017	Rubin Kazan	87	(3)
2012–2013	→ Neftekhimik (loan)	18	(0)
2017	→ Lokomotiv Moscow (loan)	12	(0)
2017–2021	Lokomotiv Moscow	68	(3)
2020–2021	→ Rotor Volgograd (loan)	19	(0)
2021–2022	Metalist 1925 Kharkiv	6	(0)
2022	Gagra	12	(0)
2022–2023	Neftçi	33	(2)
2023–2024	Al-Okhdood	33	(1)
2024	Dinamo Tbilisi	13	(1)
2025–2026	Torpedo	25	(2)
2026–	Toktogul	23	(4)

International career^{‡}
2009–2010	Georgia U-19	6	(0)
2011–2013	Georgia U-21	14	(0)
2014–	Georgia	61	(0)
- * Club domestic league appearances and goals as of 4 September 2026 ‡ National team caps and goals as of 6 October 2024

Solomon "Saba" Kvirkvelia (Order of Honor) (Georgian: სოლომონ "საბა" კვირკველია, romanized: solomon "saba" k'virk'velia, pronounced [solomon saba kʼʷiɾkʼʷelia]; born 6 February 1992) is a Georgian professional footballer who plays as a centre-back for Kyrgyz Higher League club Toktogul and the Georgia national team.

He has been twice named as Footballer of the Year in Georgia.

== Club career ==
=== Rubin Kazan ===
After spending a season with Zenit Saint Petersburg, Kvirkvelia joined another Russian club, Rubin Kazan in 2011. He made his Russian Premier League debut for Rubin Kazan on 22 July 2011 in a game against FC Terek Grozny.

=== Lokomotiv Moscow ===
In February 2017, Rubin Kazan and Lokomotiv Moscow agreed a loan deal for Kvirkvelia until the end of the 2016–17 season. Kvirkvelia became a regular member of the team, participating 12 games until the end of the 2016–17 season. Lokomotiv won Russian Cup during this season, which was the first title for the Georgian with his new club.

On 30 June 2017, he moved to Lokomotiv on a permanent basis, signing a four-year contract.

==== Loan to Rotor Volgograd ====
On 20 August 2020, he joined Rotor Volgograd on loan for the 2020–21 season.

=== Move to Ukraine ===
In October 2021, Kvirkvelia moved to the Ukrainian Premier League side Metalist 1925, although his tenure was abruptly ended due to Russian invasion of Ukraine.

=== Gagra ===
On 8 April 2022, Kvirkvelia returned to Georgia and signed with Gagra, the first Georgian club in his career.

=== Neftçi ===
On 4 July 2022, Neftçi announced the signing of Kvirkvelia on a two-year contract. On 16 July 2023, Kvirkvelia left Neftçi after his contract was terminated by mutual agreement.

=== Al-Okhdood ===
On 15 July 2023, Kvirkvelia joined Saudi Pro League club Al-Okhdood on a free transfer.

=== Dinamo Tbilisi ===
On 2 September 2024, Dinamo Tbilisi announced the signing of Kvirkvelia on a contract until the end of the year.

=== Torpedo Kutaisi ===
On 6 February 2025, Kvirkvelia moved to Torpedo, the runners-up of the previous Erovnuli Liga season, on a two-year deal.

== International career ==
On an international level, he debuted for Georgia in a friendly match against Liechtenstein on 5 March 2014.

In 2011–13, Kvirkvelia was repeatedly called up to the U21 team. Having participated in 14 competitive games, he is among the five all-time most capped players.

== Career statistics ==
=== Club ===
As of match played 6 December 2025

Appearances and goals by club, season and competition
Club	Season	League			National cup (Note: Includes Russian Cup, Ukrainian Cup, Azerbaijan Cup, King Cup)		Continental		Other		Total	
Club	Season	Division	Apps	Goals	Apps	Goals	Apps	Goals	Apps	Goals	Apps	Goals
Rubin Kazan	2011–12	Russian Premier League	8	1	2	0	4 (Note: Appearances in UEFA Champions League)	0	—		14	1
Rubin Kazan	2012–13	Russian Premier League	3	0	0	0	0	0	0	0	3	0
Rubin Kazan	2013–14	Russian Premier League	18	0	1	0	3 (Note: Appearances in UEFA Europa League)	0	–		22	0
Rubin Kazan	2014–15	Russian Premier League	29	1	3	0	—		—		32	1
Rubin Kazan	2015–16	Russian Premier League	29	1	0	0	10	0	—		39	1
Rubin Kazan	2016–17	Russian Premier League	0	0	1	0	—		—		1	0
Rubin Kazan	Total		87	3	7	0	17	0	0	0	111	3
Neftekhimik Nizhnekamsk (loan)	2012–13	Russian National Football League	18	0	1	0	—		—		19	0
Lokomotiv Moscow	2016–17	Russian Premier League	12	0	3	0	—		—		15	0
Lokomotiv Moscow	2017–18	Russian Premier League	29	2	1	1	10	0	1 (Note: Appearance in Russian Super Cup)	0	41	3
Lokomotiv Moscow	2018–19	Russian Premier League	30	1	5	0	5	0	0	0	40	1
Lokomotiv Moscow	2019–20	Russian Premier League	9	0	1	0	1	0	0	0	11	0
Lokomotiv Moscow	Total		80	3	10	1	16	0	1	0	107	4
Rotor Volgograd (loan)	2020–21	Russian Premier League	19	0	—		—		—		19	0
Metalist 1925 Kharkiv	2021–22	Ukrainian Premier League	6	0	1	0	—		—		7	0
Gagra	2022	Erovnuli Liga	12	0	—		—		—		12	0
Neftçi	2022–23	Azerbaijan Premier League	33	2	5	0	4 (Note: Appearances in UEFA Europa Conference League)	0	—		42	2
Al-Okhdood	2023–24	Saudi Pro League	33	0	1	0	—		—		34	0
Dinamo Tbilisi	2024	Erovnuli Liga	13	1	3	0	—		—		16	1
Torpedo Kutaisi	2025	Erovnuli Liga	25	2	–		2 (Note: Appearances in UEFA Conference League qualifiers)	0	2 (Note: Appearances in Georgian Super Cup)	0	29	2
Career total			326	11	28	1	39	0	3	0	396	12

=== International ===
As of 6 October 2024

Appearances and goals by national team and year
National team	Year	Apps	Goals
Georgia	2014	7	0
Georgia	2015	5	0
Georgia	2016	8	0
Georgia	2017	6	0
Georgia	2018	7	0
Georgia	2019	3	0
Georgia	2020	5	0
Georgia	2021	1	0
Georgia	2022	6	0
Georgia	2023	7	0
Georgia	2024	6	0
Total		61	0

== Honours ==
Rubin Kazan

- Russian Cup: 2011–12

Lokomotiv Moscow

- Russian Premier League: 2017–18
- Russian Cup: 2016–17, 2018–19

Individual

- Georgian Footballer of the Year: 2014, 2017
