= Andrei Vshivtsev =

Russian footballer

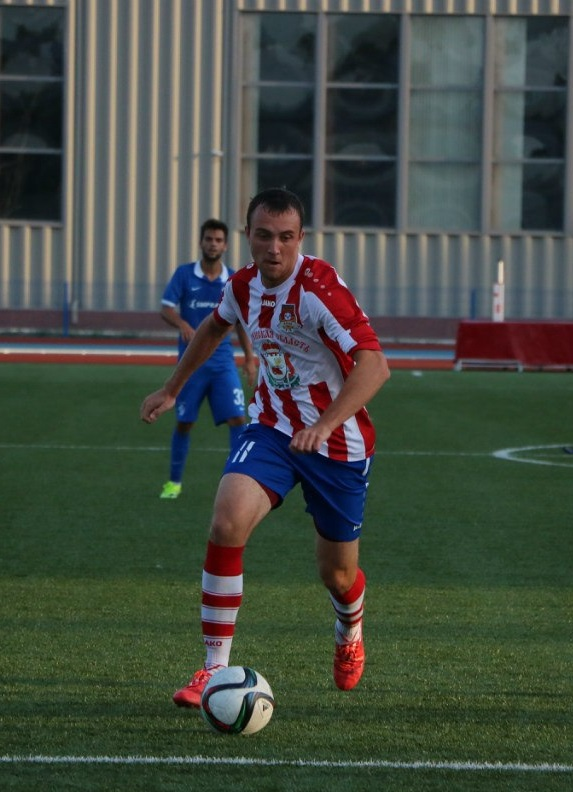

Personal information
- Full name: Andrei Aleksandrovich Vshivtsev
- Date of birth: 25 January 1994 (age 32)
- Place of birth: Izhevsk, Russia
- Height: 1.87 m (6 ft 1 1/2 in)
- Position: Forward

Youth career
- 2003–2008: Zenit Izhevsk
- 2008–2011: Rubin Kazan

Senior career*
Years	Team	Apps	(Gls)
2011–2015	Rubin Kazan	0	(0)
2013–2015	→ Rubin-2 Kazan	41	(3)
2015–2016	Dnepr Smolensk	27	(7)
2016–2017	Avangard Kursk	7	(0)
2017–2018	CRFSO Smolensk	23	(3)
2018	Dnepr Mogilev	5	(0)
2019–2022	Dynamo-Delin Izhevsk		
- * Club domestic league appearances and goals

Andrei Aleksandrovich Vshivtsev (Russian: Андрей Александрович Вшивцев; born 25 January 1994) is a Russian former football forward.

== Club career ==
He made his debut in the Russian Second Division for FC Rubin-2 Kazan on 18 April 2013 in a game against FC Nosta Novotroitsk.
