= Walter Chalá =

Ecuadorian footballer (born 1992)

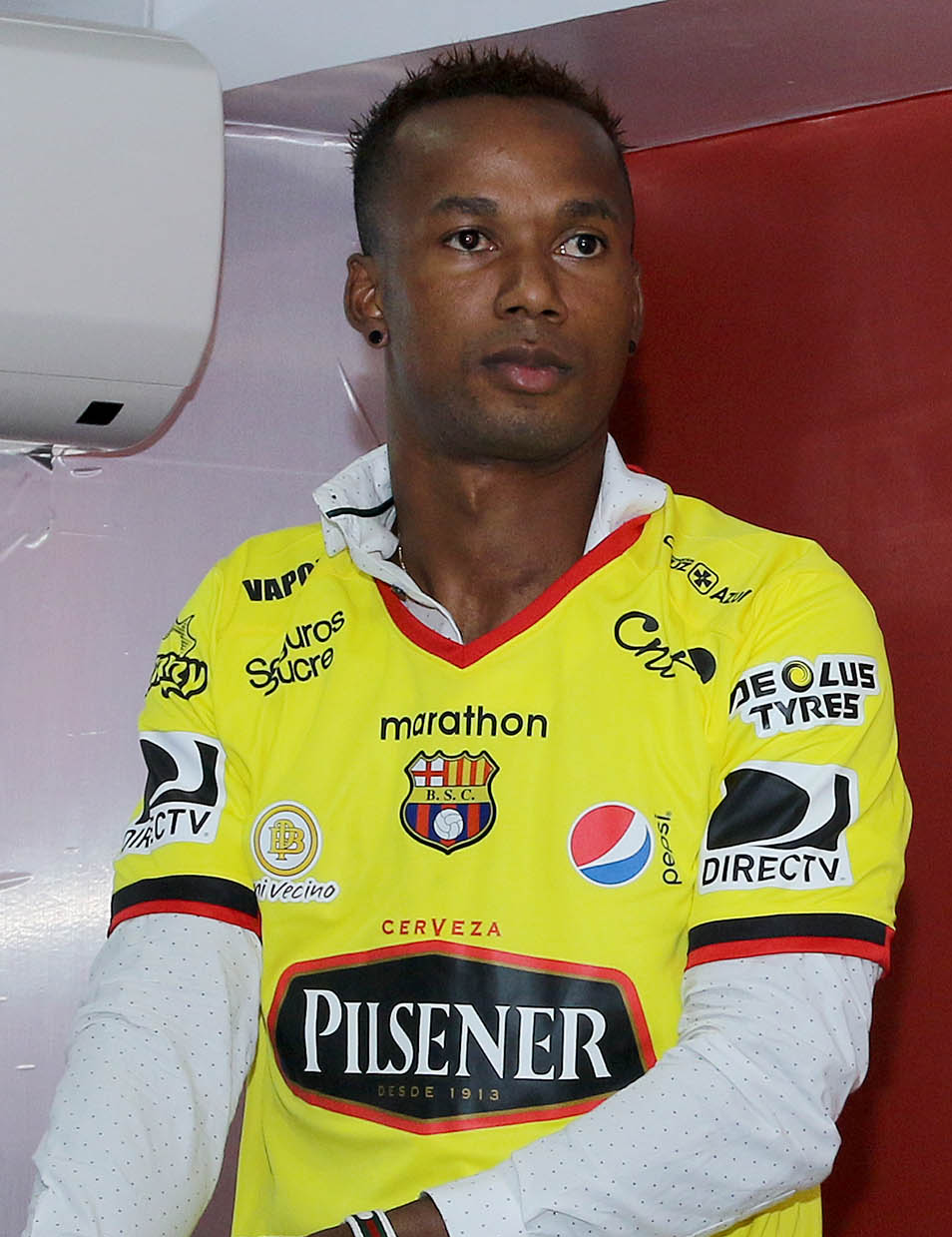

Personal information
- Full name: Walter Leodán Chalá Vázquez
- Date of birth: 24 February 1992 (age 34)
- Place of birth: Valle del Chota, Ecuador
- Height: 1.80 m (5 ft 11 in)
- Position: Forward

Team information
- Current team: Oriente Petrolero
- Number: 9

Senior career*
Years	Team	Apps	(Gls)
2010	Deportivo Cuenca	19	(7)
2011–2014	Rubin Kazan	0	(0)
2011–2012	→ Deportivo Cuenca (loan)	31	(3)
2013–2014	→ Neftekhimik Nizhnekamsk (loan)	32	(3)
2015	Independiente DV	17	(3)
2016	Deportivo Cuenca	41	(14)
2017	Barcelona SC	1	(0)
2017–2018	Correcaminos UAT	20	(3)
2018–2023	Universidad Católica	28	(2)
2023	L.D.U. Quito	10	(0)
2024	Deportivo Cuenca	20	(0)
2025-	Oriente Petrolero	23	(5)

International career^{‡}
2021–	Ecuador	2	(1)
- * Club domestic league appearances and goals as of 30 December 2025 ‡ National team caps and goals as of 26 June 2022

Walter Leodán Chalá Vázquez (born 24 February 1992) is an Ecuadorian football forward who plays for Oriente Petrolero in the Bolivian First Division

== Club career ==
He made his debut in the Russian National Football League for FC Neftekhimik Nizhnekamsk on 29 April 2013 in a game against FC Petrotrest Saint Petersburg.

== International career ==
He was named in Ecuador's senior squad for a 2018 FIFA World Cup qualifier against Brazil in September 2016. He made his debut on 29 March 2021 in a friendly against Bolivia.
