= Aleksei Berezin =

Russian professional football player

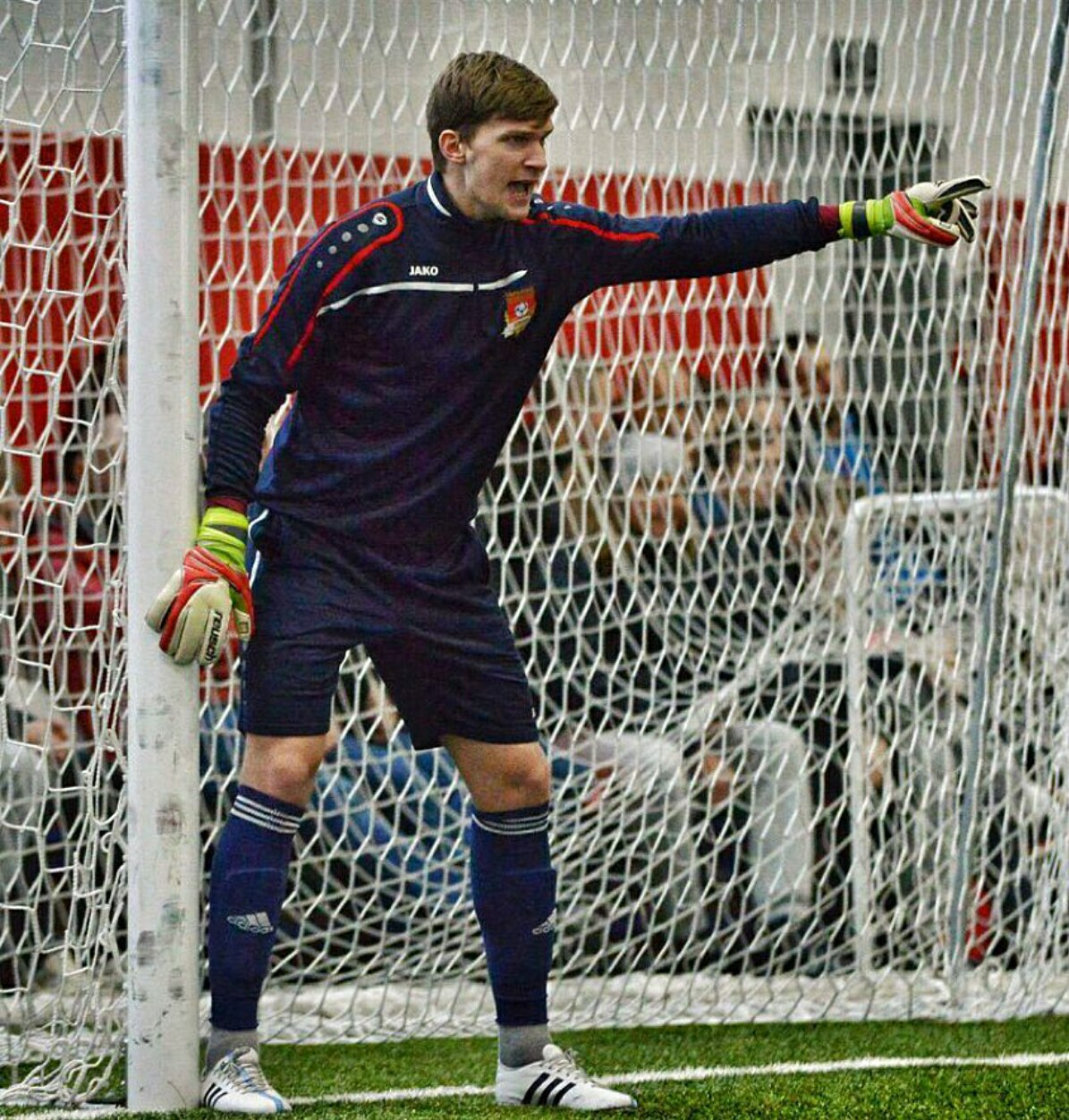

Personal information
- Full name: Aleksei Vladimirovich Berezin
- Date of birth: 16 April 1993 (age 33)
- Place of birth: Kazan, Russia
- Height: 1.89 m (6 ft 2 in)
- Position: Goalkeeper

Youth career
- 2009–2013: Rubin Kazan

Senior career*
Years	Team	Apps	(Gls)
2009–2011	Rubin-2 Kazan	28	(0)
2011–2013	Rubin Kazan	0	(0)
2014	Widzew Łódź	0	(0)
2014	Widzew Łódź II	8	(0)
2014–2015	Dnepr Smolensk	16	(0)
2016–2018	Arsenal Tula	0	(0)
2018	Dnepr Mogilev	9	(0)
2019	Isloch Minsk Raion	0	(0)
2019–2020	Ryazan	3	(0)
2020	Murom	6	(0)
2021	Zenit-Izhevsk	5	(0)

International career
2010–2011	Russia U18	6	(0)
2012	Russia U19	2	(0)
- * Club domestic league appearances and goals

Aleksei Vladimirovich Berezin (Russian: Алексей Владимирович Березин; born 16 April 1993) is a Russian former professional footballer who played as a goalkeeper.
