= Syarhey Kislyak =

Belarusian footballer (born 1987)

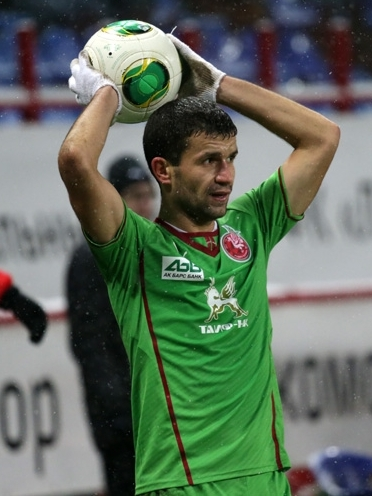

Personal information
- Full name: Syarhey Viktaravich Kislyak
- Date of birth: 6 August 1987 (age 39)
- Place of birth: Kamyanyets, Brest Oblast, Belarusian SSR, Soviet Union
- Height: 1.80 m (5 ft 11 in)
- Position: Midfielder

Youth career
- 2001–2003: RUOR Minsk

Senior career*
Years	Team	Apps	(Gls)
2002–2003	RUOR Minsk	17	(0)
2004–2010	Dinamo Minsk	138	(34)
2011–2016	Rubin Kazan	66	(4)
2012	→ Krasnodar (loan)	11	(0)
2016–2017	Gaziantepspor	12	(0)
2018	Irtysh Pavlodar	16	(0)
2018–2020	Dinamo Brest	61	(6)
2021–2022	Dinamo Minsk	31	(4)
2023–2024	Dinamo Brest	38	(5)
Total		390	(53)

International career
2003–2004	Belarus U17	6	(2)
2005–2006	Belarus U19	5	(0)
2005–2009	Belarus U21	31	(5)
2009–2021	Belarus	74	(9)
- * Club domestic league appearances and goals

Syarhey Viktaravich Kislyak (Belarusian: Сяргей Віктаравіч Кісляк; Russian: Сергей Викторович Кисляк; born 6 August 1987) is a Belarusian former professional footballer. He made 74 appearances for the Belarus national team, scoring nine goals.

== Career ==
=== Club ===
In summer 2010 Kislyak was signed by Rubin Kazan, but stayed on loan in his previous team Dinamo Minsk until the end of 2010 season. He finally joined Rubin in December 2010.

On 2 February 2018, Kislyak signed for Kazakhstan Premier League club Irtysh Pavlodar. He returned to Belarus, joining Dinamo Brest in September 2018, signing a contract for two and a half years.

=== International ===
Kislyak netted the only two goals for Belarus U-21 at the 2009 UEFA European Under-21 Football Championship, opening the scoring in the matches against Sweden U-21 and Italy U-21.

On 14 November 2009, Kislyak made his international debut for the senior side, coming on as a last-minute substitute for Sergei Kornilenko in the 1–1 away draw with Saudi Arabia in a friendly match.

On 30 May 2010, he scored his first goal for the senior side in the 1–0 friendly win against South Korea.

On 3 September 2010, Kislyak scored the only goal for the Belarusians in the 1–0 away win against France after a Vyacheslav Hleb assist to help provide a winning start to the country's Euro 2012 qualification campaign.

== Career statistics ==
=== International ===
Belarus national team
Year	Apps	Goals
2009	2	0
2010	10	2
2011	11	1
2012	7	1
2013	11	0
2014	8	3
2015	7	2
2016	6	0
2017	1	0
2018	6	0
2019	2	0
2020	0	0
2021	3	0
Total	74	9

=== International goals ===
Scores and results list Belarus' goal tally first

#	Date	Venue	Opponent	Score	Result	Competition	Ref.
1.	30 May 2010	Kufstein-Arena, Kufstein, Austria	South Korea	1–0	1–0	Friendly	
2.	3 September 2010	Stade de France, Paris, France	France	1–0	1–0	Euro 2012 qualification	
3.	10 August 2011	Dinamo Stadium, Minsk, Belarus	Bulgaria	1–0	1–0	Friendly	
4.	14 November 2012	Teddy Stadium, Jerusalem, Israel	Israel	1–1	2–1	Friendly	
5.	21 May 2014	Rheinpark Stadion, Vaduz, Liechtenstein	Liechtenstein	2–0	5–1	Friendly	
6.	4 September 2014	Borisov Arena, Barysaw, Belarus	Tajikistan	5–1	6–1	Friendly	
7.	18 November 2014	Borisov Arena, Barysaw, Belarus	Mexico	1–1	3–2	Friendly	
8.	7 June 2015	Arena Khimki, Khimki, Russia	Russia	1–1	2–4	Friendly	
9.	7 June 2015	Arena Khimki, Khimki, Russia	Russia	2–1	2–4	Friendly	

== Honours ==
Dinamo Minsk

- Belarusian Premier League champion: 2004

Rubin Kazan

- Russian Cup winner: 2011–12

Dinamo Brest

- Belarusian Premier League champion: 2019
- Belarusian Super Cup winner: 2019, 2020

== Personal ==
Kislyak has stated that his childhood football idols were Shevchenko and Maradona, while he also admires the playing style of Steven Gerrard.
