= Ruslan Makhmutov =

Russian footballer

Personal information
- Full name: Ruslan Khamitovich Makhmutov
- Date of birth: 27 January 1991 (age 35)
- Place of birth: Tolyatti, Russian SFSR
- Height: 1.73 m (5 ft 8 in)
- Position: Attacking midfielder

Youth career
- Zarya Togliatti
- Lada-Tolyatti
- Konoplyov football academy
- 2009: Dynamo Moscow
- 2010–2011: Rubin Kazan

Senior career*
Years	Team	Apps	(Gls)
2008	Tolyatti	2	(0)
2009	Tolyatti	4	(0)
2010–2011	Rubin Kazan	0	(0)
2011–2014	Neftekhimik Nizhnekamsk	63	(5)
2015–2016	Lada-Tolyatti	26	(3)
2016–2017	Syzran-2003	33	(2)
2018	Chayka Peschanokopskoye	1	(0)
2018–2019	Syzran-2003	19	(0)
2019–2020	Zenit-Izhevsk	16	(0)
2020–2024	Volga Ulyanovsk	114	(8)
2024	Lada-Tolyatti	13	(1)

International career
2010	Russia U-19	3	(0)
- * Club domestic league appearances and goals as of 19 October 2024

Ruslan Khamitovich Makhmutov (Russian: Руслан Хамитович Махмутов; born 27 January 1991) is a Russian professional footballer.

== Career ==
He made his professional debut in the Russian Second Division in 2008 for Tolyatti.

Makhmutov made his debut for the main squad of Rubin Kazan on 13 July 2010 in the Russian Cup game against Volgar-Gazprom Astrakhan.

He made his Russian Football National League debut for Neftekhimik Nizhnekamsk on 10 July 2012 in a game against Metallurg-Kuzbass Novokuznetsk.
