= Sergei Davydov (footballer, born 1985) =

Russian professional footballer

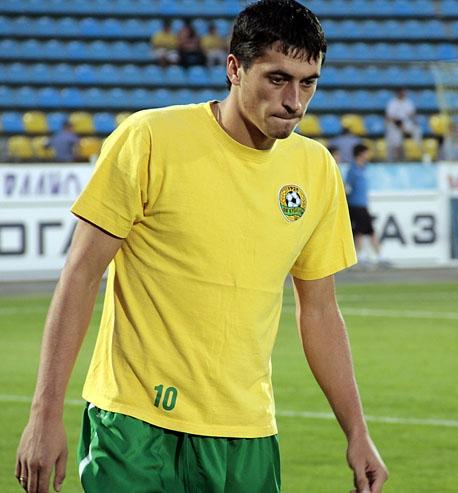

Personal information
- Full name: Sergei Sergeyevich Davydov
- Date of birth: 22 July 1985 (age 41)
- Place of birth: Moscow, Russian SFSR
- Height: 1.88 m (6 ft 2 in)
- Position: Forward

Youth career
- –1995: SDYuShOR-44 Krasnogvardeyets Moscow
- 1995–2004: Torpedo-Metallurg Moscow

Senior career*
Years	Team	Apps	(Gls)
2005–2007	Dynamo Bryansk	88	(10)
2008	Torpedo Moscow	18	(3)
2009–2010	Volgar-Gazprom Astrakhan	53	(15)
2010–2012	Kuban Krasnodar	42	(19)
2012–2016	Rubin Kazan	20	(1)
2013	→ Dynamo Moscow (loan)	8	(0)
2013–2014	→ Aktobe (loan)	16	(2)
2014–2015	→ Torpedo Moscow (loan)	7	(0)
2015–2016	→ KAMAZ Naberezhnye Chelny (loan)	18	(4)
2017	Ararat Moscow	6	(0)

International career
2011	Russia-2	2	(0)
- * Club domestic league appearances and goals

Sergei Sergeyevich Davydov (Russian: Серге́й Серге́евич Давыдов; born 22 July 1985) is a Russian former professional footballer who played as a striker.

== Club career ==
=== Dynamo Bryansk ===
Davydov started his professional career at Russian First Division side Dynamo Bryansk. Though a young talent, after not convincing, he left Dynamo Bryansk

=== Torpedo Moscow ===
In the spring of 2008 he joined Torpedo Moscow. He played a year for the Moscow team, scoring just three goals.

=== Volgar-Gazprom Astrakhan ===
In 2009, he joined Volgar-Gazprom Astrakhan. Here he played his best football yet, helping the team to remain in the Russian first division.

=== Kuban Krasnodar ===
His good skills got him a move to ambitious club Kuban Krasnodar. In the first year with the team he scored 10 goals helping the team to earn promotion to the Russian Premier League.

=== Rubin Kazan ===
On 25 February 2012, Rubin signed a three-year contract with Davydov.

== Career statistics ==
Club	Season	League			Cup		Continental		Total	
Club	Season	Division	Apps	Goals	Apps	Goals	Apps	Goals	Apps	Goals
Dynamo Bryansk	2005	Russian First League	13	1	0	0	–		13	1
Dynamo Bryansk	2006	Russian First League	36	5	1	0	–		37	5
Dynamo Bryansk	2007	Russian First League	39	4	6	1	–		45	5
Dynamo Bryansk	Total		88	10	7	1	0	0	95	11
Torpedo Moscow	2008	Russian First League	18	3	0	0	–		18	3
Volgar-Gazprom Astrakhan	2009	Russian First League	36	9	3	2	–		39	11
Volgar-Gazprom Astrakhan	2010	Russian First League	17	6	2	0	–		19	6
Volgar-Gazprom Astrakhan	Total		53	15	5	2	0	0	58	17
Kuban Krasnodar	2010	Russian First League	17	10	–		–		17	10
Kuban Krasnodar	2011–12	Russian Premier League	25	9	1	1	–		26	10
Kuban Krasnodar	Total		42	19	1	1	0	0	43	20
Rubin Kazan	2011–12	Russian Premier League	11	1	3	1	0	0	14	2
Rubin Kazan	2012–13	Russian Premier League	9	0	1	1	3 (Note: Appearances in the UEFA Europa League)	0	13	1
Rubin Kazan	2013–14	Russian Premier League	0	0	–		0	0	0	0
Rubin Kazan	Total		20	1	4	2	3	0	27	3
Dynamo Moscow (loan)	2012–13	Russian Premier League	8	0	1	0	–		9	0
Aktobe (loan)	2013	Kazakhstan Premier League	16	2	2	0	7	3	25	5
Torpedo Moscow (loan)	2014–15	Russian Premier League	7	0	1	0	–		8	0
KAMAZ (loan)	2015–16	Russian First League	18	4	1	0	–		19	4
Ararat Moscow	2017–18	Russian Second League	6	0	2	1	–		8	1
Career total			276	54	24	7	10	3	310	64

== Personal life ==
His son Vladislav Davydov is a professional footballer.
