= Jonatan Valle (Spanish footballer) =

Spanish professional footballer (born 1984)

Personal information
- Full name: Jonatan Valle Trueba
- Date of birth: 30 December 1984 (age 41)
- Place of birth: Santander, Spain
- Height: 1.70 m (5 ft 7 in)
- Position: Midfielder

Youth career
- Racing Santander

Senior career*
Years	Team	Apps	(Gls)
2002–2003	Racing B	28	(5)
2003–2009	Racing Santander	74	(2)
2006–2007	→ Málaga (loan)	26	(1)
2008–2009	→ Ponferradina (loan)	35	(11)
2009–2010	Castellón	17	(0)
2010	→ Ponferradina (loan)	14	(3)
2010–2011	Leganés	26	(4)
2012	Rubin Kazan	3	(0)
2012–2014	Recreativo	55	(6)
2014–2015	Lugo	16	(0)
2015–2016	Burgos	14	(0)
2017	Bergantiños	7	(0)
Total		315	(32)

International career
1999	Spain U16	1	(0)
2002	Spain U20	3	(1)
2004	Spain U21	4	(0)
- * Club domestic league appearances and goals

Jonatan Valle Trueba (born 30 December 1984) is a Spanish former professional footballer who played as a midfielder.

He made his La Liga debut with Racing de Santander at the age of 18, going on to appear in 82 competitive games for the club. He added 114 matches and seven goals in the Segunda División over five seasons, in representation of four teams.

== Club career ==
Valle was born in Santander. A youth product of Racing de Santander, he first appeared in La Liga on the final matchday of the 2002–03 season, playing 11 minutes in a 2–3 home loss against CA Osasuna. He was promoted to the first team for the following campaign, but would never be an undisputed starter. On 20 December 2003, he scored a late penalty in a 2–2 draw at Atlético Madrid.

After spending 2006–07 on loan to Segunda División side Málaga CF, Valle returned to Santander, playing almost no part in the Cantabrians first-ever qualification for the UEFA Cup after finishing sixth (only eight matches, one start). For the 2008–09 season he was loaned again, to SD Ponferradina in the Segunda División B.

In July 2009, Valle was bought by CD Castellón, with Racing retaining an option to reacquire the player. However, merely five months later, he returned to Ponferrada on loan until the end of the campaign, contributing 11 starts and three goals as the club returned to the second division after a three-year absence.

In the following six years, Valle alternated between his country's second and third tiers, also having a very brief spell in the Russian Premier League with FC Rubin Kazan. On 8 February 2017, the 32-year-old free agent signed with amateurs Bergantiños CF.

== Career statistics ==
As of 15 May 2016

Club	Season	League			Cup		Other		Total	
Club	Season	Division	Apps	Goals	Apps	Goals	Apps	Goals	Apps	Goals
Racing Santander	2002–03	La Liga	1	0	0	0	—		1	0
Racing Santander	2003–04	La Liga	25	2	2	0	4 (Note: Appearances in UEFA Intertoto Cup)	1	31	3
Racing Santander	2004–05	La Liga	22	0	2	0	—		24	0
Racing Santander	2005–06	La Liga	18	0	0	0	—		18	0
Racing Santander	2007–08	La Liga	8	0	0	0	—		8	0
Racing Santander	Total		74	2	4	0	4	1	82	3
Málaga (loan)	2006–07	Segunda División	26	1	3	0	—		29	1
Ponferradina (loan)	2008–09	Segunda División B	35	11	4	0	4 (Note: Appearances in Segunda División B play-offs)	1	43	12
Castellón	2009–10	Segunda División	17	0	1	0	—		18	0
Ponferradina (loan)	2009–10	Segunda División B	14	3	0	0	2	1	16	4
Leganés	2010–11	Segunda División B	26	4	0	0	1	0	27	4
Rubin Kazan	2011–12	Russian Premier League	2	0	1	0	—		3	0
Recreativo	2012–13	Segunda División	37	5	1	0	—		38	5
Recreativo	2013–14	Segunda División	18	1	0	0	—		18	1
Recreativo	Total		55	6	1	0	—		56	6
Lugo	2014–15	Segunda División	16	0	0	0	—		16	0
Burgos	2015–16	Segunda División B	14	0	0	0	—		14	0
Career total			279	27	14	0	11	3	304	30

== Honours ==
Ponferradina

- Segunda División B: 2009–10

Rubin Kazan

- Russian Cup: 2011–12
