= Yuri Nesterenko (footballer, born 1991) =

Russian footballer

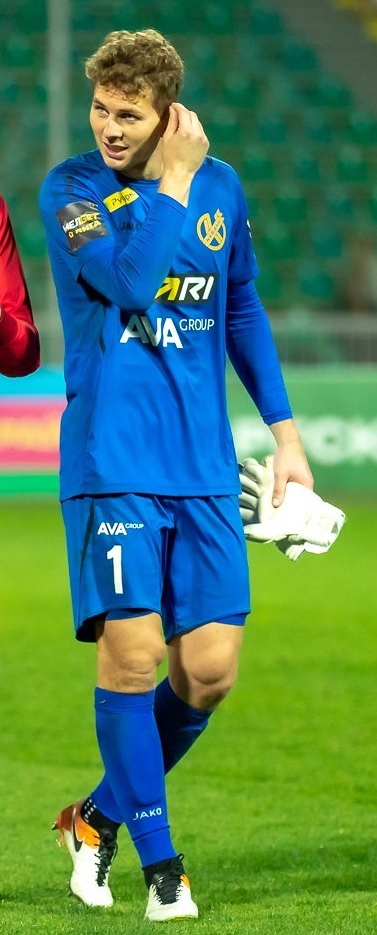
- Nesterenko with Kuban Krasnodar in 2022

Personal information
- Full name: Yuri Alekseyevich Nesterenko
- Date of birth: 12 June 1991 (age 35)
- Place of birth: Krasnodar, Russian SFSR
- Height: 1.89 m (6 ft 2 in)
- Position: Goalkeeper

Senior career*
Years	Team	Apps	(Gls)
2008–2009	FC Krasnodar-2000	24	(0)
2010–2017	Rubin Kazan	7	(0)
2011–2012	→ Rubin-2 Kazan	5	(0)
2012–2013	→ Neftekhimik Nizhnekamsk (loan)	20	(0)
2014–2015	→ Rubin-2 Kazan	8	(0)
2018–2019	Yenisey Krasnoyarsk	14	(0)
2019–2020	Rotor Volgograd	23	(0)
2020–2021	Akron Tolyatti	7	(0)
2021–2026	Kuban Krasnodar	140	(0)

International career
2009	Russia U-18	3	(0)
- * Club domestic league appearances and goals as of 13 July 2026

Yuri Alekseyevich Nesterenko (Russian: Юрий Алексеевич Нестеренко; born 12 June 1991) is a Russian former professional football goalkeeper.

== Club career ==
He made his debut in the Russian Premier League on 30 March 2014 for FC Rubin Kazan in a game against FC Rostov.

== Career statistics ==
=== Club ===
As of 9 December 2017

Club	Season	League			Cup		Continental		Total	
Club	Season	Division	Apps	Goals	Apps	Goals	Apps	Goals	Apps	Goals
FC Krasnodar-2000	2008	PFL	17	0	2	0	–		19	0
FC Krasnodar-2000	2009	PFL	7	0	2	0	–		9	0
FC Krasnodar-2000	Total		24	0	4	0	0	0	28	0
FC Rubin Kazan	2010	Russian Premier League	0	0	0	0	0	0	0	0
FC Rubin Kazan	2011–12	Russian Premier League	0	0	0	0	0	0	0	0
FC Rubin-2 Kazan	2011–12	PFL	5	0	–		–		5	0
FC Neftekhimik Nizhnekamsk	2012–13	FNL	12	0	1	0	–		13	0
FC Neftekhimik Nizhnekamsk	2013–14	FNL	8	0	1	0	–		9	0
FC Neftekhimik Nizhnekamsk	Total		20	0	2	0	0	0	22	0
FC Rubin Kazan	2013–14	Russian Premier League	2	0	0	0	0	0	2	0
FC Rubin Kazan	2014–15	Russian Premier League	3	0	0	0	–		3	0
FC Rubin Kazan	2015–16	Russian Premier League	1	0	0	0	0	0	1	0
FC Rubin Kazan	2016–17	Russian Premier League	1	0	2	0	–		3	0
FC Rubin Kazan	2017–18	Russian Premier League	0	0	0	0	–		0	0
FC Rubin Kazan	Total (2 spells)		7	0	2	0	0	0	9	0
FC Rubin-2 Kazan	2014–15	PFL	8	0	–		–		8	0
FC Rubin-2 Kazan	Total (2 spells)		13	0	0	0	0	0	13	0
Career total			64	0	8	0	0	0	72	0
