= Salvatore Bocchetti =

Italian footballer (born 1986)

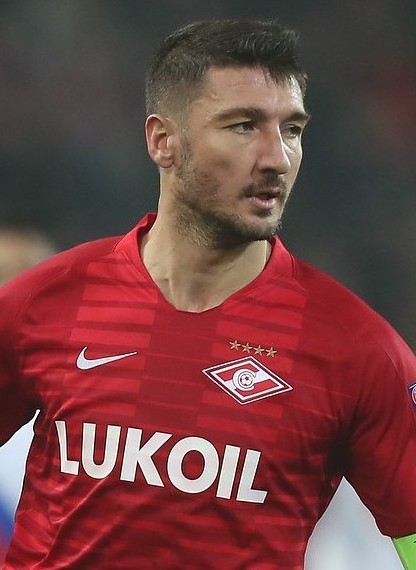
- Bocchetti with Spartak Moscow in 2018

Personal information
- Full name: Salvatore Bocchetti
- Date of birth: 30 November 1986 (age 39)
- Place of birth: Naples, Italy
- Height: 1.86 m (6 ft 1 in)
- Position: Centre-back

Youth career
- –1999: Piscinola Calcio
- 1999–2001: Internapoli
- 2001–2005: Ascoli

Senior career*
| Years | Team | Apps | (Gls) |
| 2005–2007 | Ascoli | 2 | (0) |
| 2005–2006 | → Lanciano (loan) | 21 | (1) |
| 2007 | → Frosinone (loan) | 17 | (2) |
| 2007–2008 | Frosinone | 38 | (2) |
| 2008–2010 | Genoa | 60 | (1) |
| 2010–2013 | Rubin Kazan | 52 | (9) |
| 2013–2019 | Spartak Moscow | 95 | (5) |
| 2015 | → AC Milan (loan) | 9 | (0) |
| 2019–2021 | Hellas Verona | 5 | (0) |
| 2020–2021 | → Pescara (loan) | 18 | (2) |
| Total | | 317 | (22) |

International career
| 2007 | Italy U20 | 1 | (0) |
| 2007–2009 | Italy U21 | 19 | (0) |
| 2008 | Olympic Italy | 9 | (0) |
| 2009–2010 | Italy | 5 | (0) |

Managerial career
- 2022: Hellas Verona (caretaker)
- 2024–2025: Monza
- 2025–2026: Atalanta Under-23
- * Club domestic league appearances and goals

Salvatore Bocchetti (Italian pronunciation: [salvaˈtoːre bokˈketti]; born 30 November 1986) is an Italian professional football coach and former player who played as a centre-back.

== Club career ==
Bocchetti started his professional career at Ascoli. He made his Serie A debut against Palermo on 20 December 2006. He was sent on loan to Serie C1 for Lanciano, and Frosinone of Serie B in the second half of the 2006–07 season. In the 2008–09 season Bocchetti was signed by Genoa and soon became a regular starter in central defence, also functioning as a fullback on occasion.

In the 2010–11 season, he was signed by Rubin Kazan on a 3.5-year contract with a fee reported to be around €15 million for the transfer. On 2 October 2011, Bocchetti scored two goals in a league match against Tom Tomsk. Kazan won the game 2–0. In January 2013, he moved to Spartak Moscow, another Russian Premier League club. In August 2013, he received a knee surgery and missed the rest of the season. On 27 January 2015, Milan had signed him on loan with an option to make the move permanent at the end of the season. He was released from his Spartak contract by mutual consent on 6 July 2019.

On 25 July 2019, Bocchetti joined Italian Serie A club Hellas Verona on a two-year contract.

On 29 September 2020, Bocchetti joined Serie B club Pescara on loan until 30 June 2021.

== International career ==
In March 2008, Bocchetti made his debut with the Italy U-21 squad. He established himself in Pierluigi Casiraghi's Azzurrini squad, which won the 2008 Toulon Tournament, and retained his place in the starting lineup for the Summer Olympics, as Italy reached the quarter-finals. Together with Marco Andreolli, he was first-choice in central defence during the 2009 U-21 European Championship as Italy reached the semi-finals; he was later named to the team of the tournament.

On 22 March 2009, Bocchetti received his first call-up to the senior Italy squad for two World Cup qualifiers matches but remained an unused substitute. On 10 October 2009, he made his senior national team international debut against Ireland coming on as a second-half substitute in Croke Park. He was named in Marcello Lippi's 23-man squad for the 2010 World Cup. Bocchetti was also selected for Italy's preliminary squad for Euro 2012, but was not picked for the final squad.

== Style of play ==
Bocchetti has been described as a versatile, left-footed centre back, who is also capable of being deployed as a full back. He is known for his strength, pace, and anticipation, as well as for his reliable technical ability.

== Coaching career ==
Following his retirement from active football, Bocchetti took on a career as a coach, rejoining Verona in July 2021 as a youth coach in charge of the Under-18 team. He left his role later in September 2021 to join Igor Tudor's first team coaching staff as an assistant, and also taking Tudor's place for a single Serie A league game against Cagliari on 30 April 2022 as Tudor himself was disqualified.

Following Tudor's departure and the appointment of Gabriele Cioffi as new head coach, Bocchetti was then handed over the duties of the Under-19 team for the 2022–23 season. In September 2022, he obtained a UEFA A license.

On 13 October 2022, he was promoted head coach of Verona, replacing Gabriele Cioffi. As Bocchetti had no UEFA Pro license at the time of his appointment, Verona had to ask the Italian Football Federation to hand him a temporary authorization, which was handed for a period of 30 days. He guided Verona formally as head coach for a total six games, all of them ending with defeat.

On 3 December 2022, after his temporary authorization to coach the Gialloblu expired, Verona announced the appointment of Marco Zaffaroni as new head coach, with Bocchetti as his assistant. He departed Verona by the end of the season, after the team escaped relegation by means of winning a playoff.

On 23 December 2024, Bocchetti signed a contract until 30 June 2027 as the new head coach of bottom-placed Serie A club Monza, replacing Alessandro Nesta. During his month and a half as head coach, Salvatore Bocchetti achieved a significant victory with Monza against Fiorentina — on 13 January 2025, he recorded his first win both with the Lombard club and as a professional manager, with a 2–1 result. Under his leadership, the team earned a total of 5 points. Shortly after, on 10 February 2025, the club decided to relieve him of his duties and reinstated the previous coach, Alessandro Nesta. Despite these changes, Monza was relegated to Serie B at the end of the season.

On 9 July 2025, Bocchetti was hired as the new head coach of Atalanta Under-23 in the Serie C league.

== Personal life ==
Bocchetti is married to Ekaterina Maltseva, whom he met while playing for Spartak in Russia; the couple has three children. He is fluent in Italian, English, Spanish and Russian.

== Career statistics ==
=== Club ===
As of match played 2 March 2021

Appearances and goals by club, season and competition
| Club | Season | League | | | Cup | | Continental | | Other | | Total | |
| Club | Season | Division | Apps | Goals | Apps | Goals | Apps | Goals | Apps | Goals | Apps | Goals |
|---|---|---|---|---|---|---|---|---|---|---|---|---|
| Ascoli | 2004–05 | Serie B | 0 | 0 | 0 | 0 | – | | – | | 0 | 0 |
| Ascoli | 2006–07 | Serie A | 2 | 0 | 0 | 0 | – | | – | | 2 | 0 |
| Ascoli | Total | | 2 | 0 | 0 | 0 | 0 | 0 | 0 | 0 | 2 | 0 |
| Virtus Lanciano (loan) | 2005–06 | Serie C1 | 21 | 1 | 0 | 0 | – | | – | | 21 | 1 |
| Frosinone (loan) | 2006–07 | Serie B | 17 | 2 | 0 | 0 | – | | – | | 17 | 2 |
| Frosinone (loan) | 2007–08 | Serie B | 38 | 2 | 0 | 0 | – | | – | | 38 | 2 |
| Frosinone (loan) | Total | | 55 | 4 | 0 | 0 | 0 | 0 | 0 | 0 | 55 | 4 |
| Genoa | 2008–09 | Serie A | 32 | 0 | 2 | 0 | – | | – | | 34 | 0 |
| Genoa | 2009–10 | Serie A | 28 | 1 | 0 | 0 | 7 | 0 | – | | 35 | 1 |
| Genoa | Total | | 60 | 1 | 2 | 0 | 7 | 0 | 0 | 0 | 69 | 1 |
| Rubin Kazan | 2010 | Russian Premier League | 7 | 2 | – | | 6 | 0 | – | | 13 | 2 |
| Rubin Kazan | 2011–12 | Russian Premier League | 32 | 5 | 4 | 1 | 13 | 0 | – | | 49 | 6 |
| Rubin Kazan | 2012–13 | Russian Premier League | 13 | 2 | 1 | 0 | 4 | 0 | 1 (Note: One appearance, one goal in the Russian Super Cup) | 1 | 19 | 3 |
| Rubin Kazan | Total | | 52 | 9 | 5 | 1 | 23 | 0 | 1 | 1 | 81 | 11 |
| Spartak Moscow | 2012–13 | Russian Premier League | 10 | 0 | – | | – | | – | | 10 | 0 |
| Spartak Moscow | 2013–14 | Russian Premier League | 12 | 0 | 1 | 0 | 0 | 0 | – | | 13 | 0 |
| Spartak Moscow | 2014–15 | Russian Premier League | 3 | 0 | 2 | 0 | – | | – | | 5 | 0 |
| Spartak Moscow | 2015–16 | Russian Premier League | 28 | 3 | 2 | 0 | – | | – | | 30 | 3 |
| Spartak Moscow | 2016–17 | Russian Premier League | 15 | 1 | 0 | 0 | 2 | 0 | – | | 17 | 1 |
| Spartak Moscow | 2017–18 | Russian Premier League | 12 | 1 | 1 | 0 | 4 | 0 | 1 (Note: One appearance in the Russian Super Cup) | 0 | 18 | 1 |
| Spartak Moscow | 2018–19 | Russian Premier League | 15 | 0 | 2 | 0 | 5 | 0 | – | | 22 | 0 |
| Spartak Moscow | Total | | 95 | 5 | 8 | 0 | 11 | 0 | 1 | 0 | 115 | 5 |
| A.C. Milan (loan) | 2014–15 | Serie A | 9 | 0 | – | | – | | – | | 9 | 0 |
| Hellas Verona | 2019–20 | Serie A | 5 | 0 | – | | – | | – | | 5 | 0 |
| Pescara (loan) | 2020–21 | Serie B | 18 | 2 | 1 | 0 | – | | – | | 19 | 2 |
| Career total | | | 317 | 22 | 16 | 1 | 41 | 0 | 2 | 1 | 376 | 24 |

=== International ===
As of match played 5 June 2010

Appearances and goals by national team and year
| National team | Year | Apps | Goals |
|---|---|---|---|
| Italy | 2009 | 3 | 0 |
| Italy | 2010 | 2 | 0 |
| Total | | 5 | 0 |

== Managerial statistics ==
As of match played 9 February 2025

Managerial record by team and tenure
| Team | Nat | From | To | Record | | | | | | | |
| Team | Nat | From | To | G | W | D | L | GF | GA | GD | Win % |
|---|---|---|---|---|---|---|---|---|---|---|---|
| Hellas Verona (caretaker) | (Italy) | 13 October 2022 | 2 December 2022 | 6 | 0 | 0 | 6 | 4 | 12 | −8 | 0.00 |
| Monza | (Italy) | 23 December 2024 | 10 February 2025 | 7 | 1 | 0 | 6 | 6 | 16 | −10 | 14.29 |
| Total | | | | 13 | 1 | 0 | 12 | 10 | 28 | −18 | 7.69 |

== Honours ==
Rubin Kazan

- Russian Cup: 2011–12
- Russian Super Cup: 2012

Spartak Moscow

- Russian Premier League: 2016–17
- Russian Super Cup: 2017

Italy U21

- Toulon Tournament: 2008

Individual

- 2009 UEFA European under-21 Championship Team of the Tournament
