= 2008 FC Rubin Kazan season =

FC Rubin Kazan
2008 season
- Chairman: Farit Khabriyev
- Manager: Kurban Berdyev
- Stadium: Central Stadium
- Premier League: 1st
- Russian Cup: Progressed to 2009 season
- Top goalscorer: League: Three Players (6); All: Three Players (6)

The 2008 FC Rubin Kazan season was the club's 6th season in the Russian Premier League, the highest tier of association football in Russia. Rubin finished the league season as champions of Russia for the first time in club history and thereby qualified for the UEFA Champions League for the first time ever, entering at the group stage of the competition during the 2009–10 season.

== Squad ==
As of match played 22 November 2008

No.	Name	Nationality	Position	Date of birth (age)	Signed from	Signed in	Contract ends	Apps.	Goals
Goalkeepers
1	Sergei Kozko	(Russia)	GK	12 April 1975 (aged 33)	Moscow	2008			
29	Nukri Revishvili	(Georgia (country))	GK	2 March 1987 (aged 21)	Torpedo Kutaisi	2006		7	0
32	Yevgeni Cheremisin	(Russia)	GK	29 February 1988 (aged 20)	Neftekhimik Nizhnekamsk	2008		0	0
64	Dmitry Kortnev	(Russia)	GK	16 May 1989 (aged 19)	Youth Team	2008		0	0
77	Sergey Ryzhikov	(Russia)	GK	19 September 1980 (aged 28)	Lokomotiv Moscow	2008		27	0
Defenders
2	Stjepan Tomas	(Croatia)	DF	6 March 1976 (aged 32)	Galatasaray	2007		31	0
3	Cristian Ansaldi	(Argentina)	DF	20 September 1986 (aged 22)	Newell's Old Boys	2008		28	1
4	Jefthon	(Brazil)	DF	3 January 1982 (aged 26)	Kuban Krasnodar	2008		4	0
5	Andrei Fyodorov	(Uzbekistan)	DF	10 April 1971 (aged 37)	Baltika Kaliningrad	2000			
9	Lasha Salukvadze	(Georgia (country))	DF	21 December 1981 (aged 26)	Dinamo Tbilisi	2005		80	1
22	Aleksandr Orekhov	(Russia)	DF	29 November 1983 (aged 24)	Kuban Krasnodar	2008		11	0
24	Aleksei Popov	(Russia)	DF	7 July 1978 (aged 30)	Amkar Perm	2008		7	0
27	Davit Kvirkvelia	(Georgia (country))	DF	27 June 1980 (aged 28)	Metalurh Zaporizhya	2008		24	3
44	Igor Klimov	(Russia)	DF	1 November 1989 (aged 19)	Youth Team	2007		2	0
65	Maksim Zhestokov	(Russia)	DF	19 June 1991 (aged 17)	Youth Team	2008		0	0
76	Roman Sharonov	(Russia)	DF	8 September 1976 (aged 32)	Shinnik Yaroslavl	2008			
80	Dmitri Tarabrikov	(Russia)	DF	23 April 1990 (aged 18)	Youth Team	2008		0	0
82	Mikhail Mishchenko	(Russia)	DF	27 June 1989 (aged 19)	SOYUZ-Gazprom Izhevsk	2008		1	0
Midfielders
6	MacBeth Sibaya	(South Africa)	MF	25 November 1977 (aged 30)	Rosenborg	2003		116	2
7	Sergei Semak	(Russia)	MF	27 February 1976 (aged 32)	Moscow	2008		27	5
10	Andrei Kobenko	(Russia)	MF	25 June 1982 (aged 26)	Amkar Perm	2008		18	2
15	Aleksandr Ryazantsev	(Russia)	MF	5 September 1986 (aged 22)	Moscow	2006		64	7
16	Christian Noboa	(Ecuador)	MF	9 April 1985 (aged 23)	Emelec	2007		42	7
23	Yevgeni Balyaikin	(Russia)	MF	19 May 1988 (aged 20)	Sibiryak Bratsk	2007		16	0
41	Ilsur Samigullin	(Russia)	MF	6 February 1991 (aged 17)	Youth Team	2008		0	0
43	Aleksei Kotlyarov	(Russia)	MF	11 May 1989 (aged 19)	Youth Team	2008		1	0
48	Vadim Afonin	(Uzbekistan)	MF	29 September 1987 (aged 21)	Traktor Tashkent	2006		1	0
49	Vagiz Galiulin	(Uzbekistan)	MF	10 October 1987 (aged 21)	Traktor Tashkent	2007		3	1
61	Gökdeniz Karadeniz	(Turkey)	MF	11 January 1980 (aged 28)	Trabzonspor	2008		27	6
83	Vladimir Chernov	(Russia)	MF	15 January 1991 (aged 17)	Youth Team	2008		0	0
93	Shamil Alimagomayev	(Russia)	MF	13 July 1989 (aged 19)	Anzhi-Bekenez Makhachkala	2008		0	0
94	Artyom Ivanov	(Russia)	MF	16 February 1990 (aged 18)	Youth Team	2008		0	0
95	Valeriy Zimakov	(Russia)	MF	22 November 1990 (aged 18)	Youth Team	2008		0	0
	Gabriel Giurgiu	(Romania)	MF	3 September 1982 (aged 26)	Oțelul Galați	2007		4	0
Forwards
11	Aleksandr Bukharov	(Russia)	FW	12 March 1985 (aged 23)	Chernomorets Novorossiysk	2005		42	14
14	Serhii Rebrov	(Ukraine)	FW	3 June 1974 (aged 34)	Dynamo Kyiv	2008	2009	24	5
19	Savo Milošević	(Serbia)	FW	2 September 1973 (aged 35)	Osasuna	2008	2008	17	3
21	Roman Adamov	(Russia)	FW	21 June 1982 (aged 26)	Moscow	2008		14	1
56	Ruslan Nagayev	(Russia)	FW	14 February 1989 (aged 19)	Youth Team	2008		1	0
67	Davron Mirzaev	(Uzbekistan)	FW	8 February 1989 (aged 19)	Pakhtakor Tashkent	2007		1	0
68	Ilya Kukharchuk	(Russia)	FW	2 August 1990 (aged 18)	Youth Team	2008		0	0
81	Ildar Bikchantayev	(Russia)	FW	2 February 1990 (aged 18)	Akademiya Dimitrovgrad	2008		1	0
92	Wahyt Orazsähedow	(Turkmenistan)	FW	26 January 1992 (aged 16)	Köpetdag Aşgabat	2008		0	0
97	Igor Portnyagin	(Russia)	FW	7 January 1989 (aged 19)	SOYUZ-Gazprom Izhevsk	2008		1	0
99	Hasan Kabze	(Turkey)	FW	26 May 1982 (aged 26)	Galatasaray	2007		35	6
Away on loan
8	Pyotr Gitselov	(Russia)	MF	18 July 1983 (aged 25)	Bodens	2007		13	0
28	Sergei Nesterenko	(Russia)	DF	30 December 1986 (aged 21)	Dynamo Barnaul	2007		2	0
31	Gabriel	(Brazil)	DF	4 August 1981 (aged 27)	União de Leiria	2006	2009	45	5
46	Aleksandr Yarkin	(Russia)	FW	29 December 1986 (aged 21)	Dynamo Barnaul	2006		8	0
79	Pavel Kharchik	(Turkmenistan)	GK	5 April 1979 (aged 29)	Neftekhimik Nizhnekamsk	2004			
	Aleksandrs Koliņko	(Latvia)	GK	18 June 1975 (aged 33)	Rostov	2005		84	0
	Aleksandr Kulikov	(Russia)	DF	19 March 1988 (aged 20)	Youth Team	2007		0	0
	Fábio	(Portugal)	MF	2 May 1982 (aged 26)	Real Sociedad	2007		9	0
	Dmitri Shestakov	(Russia)	MF	26 February 1983 (aged 25)	Sportakademklub Moscow	2005		0	0
	Vladimir Dyadyun	(Russia)	FW	12 July 1988 (aged 20)	Youth Team	2007		6	1
Players that left Rubin Kazan during the season
20	Aleksei Rebko	(Russia)	MF	23 April 1986 (aged 22)	Spartak Moscow	2008		2	0
26	Alexandru Gațcan	(Moldova)	MF	27 March 1984 (aged 24)	Spartak Chelyabinsk	2006	2008	51	4
91	Pavel Krasnikov	(Russia)	DF	25 February 1990 (aged 18)	Youth Team	2008		0	0
98	Dmitri Vasilyev	(Russia)	MF	25 March 1977 (aged 31)	Shinnik Yaroslavl	2005		47	2
	Walter García	(Argentina)	DF	14 March 1984 (aged 24)	San Lorenzo	2006	2009	5	0

=== On loan ===
Note: Flags indicate national team as defined under FIFA eligibility rules; some limited exceptions apply. Players may hold more than one non-FIFA nationality.

No.	Pos.	Nation	Player
8	MF	RUS	Pyotr Gitselov (at Rostov until end of the season)
28	DF	RUS	Sergei Nesterenko (at SKA-Energia Khabarovsk until end of the season)
31	DF	BRA	Gabriel (at Khimki until end of the season)
46	FW	RUS	Aleksandr Yarkin (at SKA-Energia Khabarovsk until end of the season)
79	GK	TKM	Pavel Kharchik (at Anzhi Makhachkala until end of the season)

No.	Pos.	Nation	Player
—	GK	LVA	Aleksandrs Koliņko (at Rubin-2 Kazan until end of the season)
—	DF	RUS	Aleksandr Kulikov (at Salyut-Energiya until end of the season)
—	MF	POR	Fábio (at Asteras Tripolis until Summer 2009)
—	MF	RUS	Dmitri Shestakov (at Ryazan until end of the season)
—	FW	RUS	Vladimir Dyadyun (at Rostov until end of the season)

=== Left club during season ===
Note: Flags indicate national team as defined under FIFA eligibility rules; some limited exceptions apply. Players may hold more than one non-FIFA nationality.

No.	Pos.	Nation	Player
20	MF	RUS	Aleksei Rebko (to Moscow)
26	MF	MDA	Alexandru Gațcan (to Rostov)
91	DF	RUS	Pavel Krasnikov

No.	Pos.	Nation	Player
98	MF	RUS	Dmitri Vasilyev (to Shinnik Yaroslavl)
—	DF	ARG	Walter García (to Nacional)

== Transfers ==
=== In ===
Date	Position	Nationality	Name	From	Fee	Ref.
Winter 2008	GK	(Russia)	Yevgeni Cheremisin	Neftekhimik Nizhnekamsk	Undisclosed	
Winter 2008	GK	(Russia)	Sergey Ryzhikov	Lokomotiv Moscow	Undisclosed	
Winter 2008	GK	(Russia)	Sergei Kozko	Moscow	Undisclosed	
Winter 2008	DF	(Argentina)	Cristian Ansaldi	Newell's Old Boys	Undisclosed	
Winter 2008	DF	(Brazil)	Jefthon	Kuban Krasnodar	Undisclosed	
Winter 2008	DF	(Georgia (country))	Davit Kvirkvelia	Metalurh Zaporizhya	Undisclosed	
Winter 2008	DF	(Russia)	Mikhail Mishchenko	SOYUZ-Gazprom Izhevsk	Undisclosed	
Winter 2008	DF	(Russia)	Aleksandr Orekhov	Kuban Krasnodar	Undisclosed	
Winter 2008	DF	(Russia)	Roman Sharonov	Shinnik Yaroslavl	Undisclosed	
Winter 2008	MF	(Russia)	Shamil Alimagomayev	Anzhi-Bekenez Makhachkala	Undisclosed	
Winter 2008	MF	(Russia)	Andrei Kobenko	Amkar Perm	Undisclosed	
Winter 2008	MF	(Russia)	Aleksei Rebko	Spartak Moscow	Undisclosed	
Winter 2008	MF	(Russia)	Sergei Semak	Moscow	Undisclosed	
Winter 2008	FW	(Russia)	Roman Adamov	Moscow	Undisclosed	
Winter 2008	FW	(Russia)	Ildar Bikchantayev	Akademiya Dimitrovgrad	Undisclosed	
Winter 2008	FW	(Russia)	Igor Portnyagin	SOYUZ-Gazprom Izhevsk	Undisclosed	
Winter 2008	FW	(Turkmenistan)	Wahyt Orazsähedow	Köpetdag Aşgabat	Undisclosed	
3 March 2008†	FW	(Ukraine)	Serhii Rebrov	Dynamo Kyiv	Undisclosed	
11 March 2008	FW	(Serbia)	Savo Milošević	Osasuna	Free	
13 March 2008	MF	(Turkey)	Gökdeniz Karadeniz	Trabzonspor	Undisclosed	
Summer 2008	DF	(Russia)	Aleksei Popov	Amkar Perm	Undisclosed	
Summer 2008	FW	(Russia)	Roman Adamov	Moscow	Undisclosed	

† Rebrov's move was announced on the above date, but not finalised until the end of his Dynamo Kyiv contract during the summer of 2008.

=== Out ===
Date	Position	Nationality	Name	To	Fee	Ref.
Summer 2008	DF	(Argentina)	Walter García	Nacional	Undisclosed	
Summer 2008	MF	(Moldova)	Alexandru Gațcan	Rostov	Undisclosed	
Summer 2008	MF	(Russia)	Aleksei Rebko	Moscow	Undisclosed	
Summer 2008	MF	(Russia)	Dmitri Vasilyev	Shinnik Yaroslavl	Undisclosed	

=== Loans out ===
Date from	Position	Nationality	Name	To	Date to	Ref.
Winter 2007	FW	(Russia)	Aleksandr Yarkin	SKA-Energia Khabarovsk	End of Season	
Summer 2007	MF	(Portugal)	Fábio	Marítimo	Summer 2008	
Winter 2008	GK	(Latvia)	Aleksandrs Koliņko	Rubin-2 Kazan	End of Season	
Winter 2008	GK	(Turkmenistan)	Pavel Kharchik	Anzhi Makhachkala	End of Season	
Winter 2008	DF	(Russia)	Aleksandr Kulikov	Salyut-Energiya	31 December 2009	
Winter 2008	DF	(Russia)	Sergei Nesterenko	SKA-Energia Khabarovsk	End of Season	
Winter 2008	MF	(Romania)	Gabriel Giurgiu	Oțelul Galați	Summer 2008	
Winter 2008	MF	(Russia)	Dmitri Shestakov	FC Ryazan	End of Season	
Winter 2008	FW	(Russia)	Vladimir Dyadyun	Rostov	End of Season	
29 August 2008	DF	(Brazil)	Gabriel	Khimki	End of Season	
Summer 2008	MF	(Russia)	Pyotr Gitselov	Rostov	End of Season	
Summer 2008	MF	(Portugal)	Fábio	Asteras Tripolis	Summer 2009	

=== Released ===
Date	Position	Nationality	Name	Joined	Date
Summer 2008	DF	(Russia)	Pavel Krasnikov		
Winter 2008	GK	(Latvia)	Aleksandrs Koliņko	JFK Olimps	
Winter 2008	GK	(Turkmenistan)	Pavel Kharchik	Aşgabat	
Winter 2008	DF	(Brazil)	Jefthon	NK Zagreb	
Winter 2008	DF	(Uzbekistan)	Andrei Fyodorov	Retired	
Winter 2008	MF	(Romania)	Gabriel Giurgiu	Oțelul Galați	
Winter 2008	MF	(Russia)	Shamil Alimagomayev	Anzhi Makhachkala	
Winter 2008	MF	(Russia)	Artyom Ivanov		
Winter 2008	MF	(Russia)	Andrei Kobenko	Terek Grozny	
Winter 2008	MF	(Russia)	Valeriy Zimakov	Khimki	
Winter 2008	MF	(Uzbekistan)	Vadim Afonin	Shurtan Guzar	
Winter 2008	FW	(Serbia)	Savo Milošević	Retired	

== Competitions ==
=== Premier League ===
==== Results by round ====
Round	1	2	3	4	5	6	7	8	9	10	11	12	13	14	15	16	17	18	19	20	21	22	23	24	25	26	27	28	29	30
Ground	A	H	A	H	A	H	A	H	A	A	H	A	H	A	H	A	H	A	H	A	H	A	H	H	A	H	A	H	A	H
Result	W	W	W	W	W	W	W	L	W	L	D	D	D	D	D	D	W	W	W	W	W	W	L	W	W	W	W	L	L	L

Updated to match(es) played on 22 November 2008. Source: See Results
A = Away; H = Home; W = Win; D = Draw; L = Loss

==== Results ====
16 March 2008 1	Lokomotiv Moscow	0 – 1	Rubin Kazan	Moscow
19:00 MSK (UTC+3)		Report	Sharonov 45+'; Ryazantsev (yellow card) 53'; Kobenko (yellow card) 85'; Ansaldi (yellow card) 90'; Kabze (yellow card) FT	Stadium: RZD Arena; Attendance: 15,540; Referee: Vladislav Bezborodov

23 March 2008 2	Rubin Kazan	1 – 0	Luch-Energiya Vladivostok	Kazan
15:30 MSK (UTC+3)	Sheshukov 17' (o.g.); Sibaya (yellow card) 35'; Kvirkvelia (yellow card) 52'; Orekhov (yellow card) 74' (yellow-red card) 88'; Ansaldi (yellow card) 77'; Ryzhikov (yellow card) 90'	Report	Vujović (yellow card) 39'; Gvazava (yellow card) 45'; Goore (yellow card) 61'; Damjanović (yellow card) 88'	Stadium: Central Stadium; Attendance: 15,000; Referee: Yuri Baskakov

30 March 2008 3	Zenit St.Petersburg	1 – 3	Rubin Kazan	Saint Petersburg
18:00 MSK (UTC+3)	Fayzulin (yellow card) 3'; Arshavin 16'; Križanac (yellow card) 35'	Report	Kobenko (yellow card) 12'; Semak 76'; Karadeniz 77', 84'	Stadium: Petrovsky Stadium; Attendance: 21,470; Referee: Igor Zakharov

5 April 2008 4	Rubin Kazan	2 – 1	Tom Tomsk	Kazan
19:00 MSK (UTC+3)	Semak (yellow card) 45+' (goal) 74' (pen.); Tomas (yellow card) 52'; Kvirkvelia 65'; Balyaikin (yellow card) 90+'	Report	Tarasov (yellow card) 35'; Volkov (yellow card) 40'; Klimov (yellow card) 74'; Mladenov 77' (pen.) (red card) 90+'; Jokić (yellow card) 90+'; Vejić (yellow card) FT	Stadium: Central Stadium; Attendance: 16,500; Referee: Maksim Layushkin

12 April 2008 5	Khimki	0 – 4	Rubin Kazan	Khimki
19:00 MSK (UTC+3)	Yevstafyev (yellow card) 46'; Drozdov (yellow card) 55'; Čeh (penalty missed) 59'; Golovatenco (yellow card) 68'	Report	Karadeniz 56', 61'; Kobenko 73'; Rebrov (yellow card) 79'; Sibaya (yellow card) 83'; Noboa 88'	Stadium: Rodina Stadium; Attendance: 5,100; Referee: Nikolai Ivanov

20 April 2008 6	Rubin Kazan	1 – 0	Amkar Perm	Kazan
17:00 MSK (UTC+3)	Tomas (yellow card) 18'; Rebrov (yellow card) 20'; Kabze (yellow card) 65'; Semak 67'; Balyaikin (yellow card) 90'	Report	Zhilyayev (yellow card) 16'; Grishin (yellow card) 45'; Popov (yellow card) 56'	Stadium: Central Stadium; Attendance: 17,000; Referee: Igor Egorov

25 April 2008 7	Dynamo Moscow	0 – 2	Rubin Kazan	Moscow
19:00 MSK (UTC+3)	Tanasijević (yellow card) 48'; Danny (yellow card) 61'; K.Kombarov (yellow card) 63'	Report	Ansaldi (yellow card) 3'; Kvirkvelia 28' (yellow card) 60'; Semak 34'; Sharonov (yellow card) 57'; Balyaikin (yellow card) 62'	Stadium: Central Dynamo Stadium; Attendance: 12,000; Referee: Vitali Doroshenko

3 May 2008 8	Rubin Kazan	0 – 3	Spartak Moscow	Kazan
MSK (UTC+3)	Semak (yellow card) 30'; Kvirkvelia (yellow card) 62'; Balyaikin (yellow card) 78'	Report	Welliton 20' (yellow card) 30'; Mozart (yellow card) 24'; Bazhenov 65'; Pavlenko 69'	Stadium: Central Stadium; Attendance: 28,500; Referee: Nikolai Ivanov

7 May 2008 9	Moscow	1 – 2	Rubin Kazan	Moscow
MSK (UTC+3)	Kaleshin 34' (yellow card) 38'; Epureanu (yellow card) 59'	Report	Semak (yellow card) 57'; Kabze 61'; Ryazantsev (yellow card) 79' (goal) 88'; Sibaya (yellow card) 82'	Stadium: Eduard Streltsov Stadium; Attendance: 4,500; Referee: Stanislav Sukhina

10 May 2008 10	Spartak Nalchik	2 – 0	Rubin Kazan	Nalchik
16:30 MSK (UTC+3)	Kalimullin 9'; Geteriev (yellow card) 31'; Kisenkov 57' (yellow card) 75'; Shumeyko (yellow card) 59'; Siradze (yellow card) 84' (penalty missed) 90+'	Report	Ryazantsev (yellow card) 40'; Karadeniz (yellow card) 42'; Orekhov (yellow card) 52'; Sharonov (yellow card) 57'; Ansaldi (yellow card) 74'	Stadium: Spartak Stadium; Attendance: 8,000; Referee: Yuri Baskakov

15 May 2008 11	Rubin Kazan	1 – 1	Shinnik Yaroslavl	Kazan
18:15 MSK (UTC+3)	Karadeniz 58'; Noboa (yellow card) 74'; Kvirkvelia (yellow card) 90+'	Report	Silva (yellow card) 45'; Basto (yellow card) 68'; Boyarintsev 90' (yellow card) 90+'	Stadium: Central Stadium; Attendance: 8,000; Referee: Aleksandr Gvardis

5 July 2008 12	Krylia Sovetov	2 – 2	Rubin Kazan	Samara
17:00 MSK (UTC+3)	Savin 40'; Ajinjal (yellow card) 70' (goal) 88' (pen.); Salugin (yellow card) 83'; Booth (yellow card) 90+'	Report	Noboa 10', 66' (yellow card) 30'	Stadium: Metallurg Stadium; Attendance: 19,000; Referee: Yuri Baskakov

13 July 2008 13	Rubin Kazan	0 – 0	Saturn Ramenskoye	Kazan
MSK (UTC+3)	Kvirkvelia (yellow card) 79'; Tomas (yellow card) 87'	Report	Angbwa (yellow card) 12'; Nemov (yellow card) 40'; Kirichenko (yellow card) 53'	Stadium: Central Stadium; Attendance: 16,500; Referee: Alexei Kovalev

20 July 2008 14	Terek Grozny	0 – 0	Rubin Kazan	Grozny
19:00 MSK (UTC+3)	Pancu (yellow card) 42'; Dzhabrailov (yellow card) 89'; Bouli (yellow card) 90+1'	Report	Noboa (yellow card) 36'; Ryzhikov (yellow card) 42'; Ryazantsev (yellow card) 83'	Stadium: Sultan Bilimkhanov Stadium; Attendance: 9,500; Referee: Maksim Layushkin

26 July 2008 15	Rubin Kazan	0 – 0	CSKA Moscow	Kazan
14:00 MSK (UTC+3)	Ansaldi (yellow card) 45'; Kabze (yellow card) 57'; Sibaya (yellow card) 70'	Report	Zhirkov (yellow card) 26'; V.Berezutski (yellow card) 63'; A.Berezutski (yellow card) 64'	Stadium: Central Stadium; Attendance: 22,300; Referee: Vladimir Pettay

3 August 2008 16	Luch-Energiya Vladivostok	1 – 1	Rubin Kazan	Vladivostok
12:00 MSK (UTC+3)	Alves 22'; Gvazava (yellow card) 23'; Streltsov (yellow card) 35'	Report	Semak (yellow card) 75'; Karadeniz 86'	Stadium: Dynamo Stadium; Attendance: 9,000; Referee: Aleksandr Gvardis

10 August 2008 17	Rubin Kazan	4 – 1	Zenit St.Petersburg	Kazan
19:00 MSK (UTC+3)	Bukharov 9', 11'; Rebrov 12'; Karadeniz (yellow card) 21'; Kobenko 86'	Report	Tymoshchuk (yellow card) 15' (yellow-red card) 90' (goal) 23' (pen.); Križanac (yellow card) 55'; Puygrenier (red card) 76'	Stadium: Central Stadium; Attendance: 24,000; Referee: Maksim Layushkin

15 August 2008 18	Tom Tomsk	1 – 2	Rubin Kazan	Tomsk
16:00 MSK (UTC+3)	Jokić 4'; Kontsedalov (yellow card) 27'; Kabanov (yellow card) 68'	Report	Kvirkvelia 24'; Rebrov 32'; Semak (yellow card) 38'; Karadeniz (yellow card) 42'; Ansaldi (yellow card) 75'; Ryzhikov (yellow card) 90+'	Stadium: Trud Stadium; Attendance: 12,000; Referee: Nikolai Ivanov

23 August 2008 19	Rubin Kazan	2 – 0	Khimki	Kazan
15:00 MSK (UTC+3)	Kudryashov 52' (o.g.); Semak (yellow card) 77'; Kabze 90+'	Report	Kudryashov (yellow card) 15'; Rebeja (yellow card) 31'; Titov (yellow card) 59'; Pylypchuk (yellow card) 87'	Stadium: Central Stadium; Attendance: 12,500; Referee: Sergei Karasev

31 August 2008 20	Amkar Perm	1 – 2	Rubin Kazan	Perm
17:30 MSK (UTC+3)	Volkov (yellow card) 53'; Kushev 58' (pen.) (yellow card) 69'	Report	Kobenko (yellow card) 42'; Sharonov (yellow card) 45'; Ansaldi (yellow card) 55'; Bukharov 68'; Noboa 73'	Stadium: Zvezda Stadium; Attendance: 18,500; Referee: Igor Zakharov

13 September 2008 21	Rubin Kazan	1 – 0	Dynamo Moscow	Kazan
MSK (UTC+3)	Rebrov 2'; Tomas (yellow card) 49'; Kvirkvelia (yellow card) 64'	Report	Dimidko (yellow card) 57'; Wilkshire (yellow card) 90+'	Stadium: Central Stadium; Attendance: 18,500; Referee: Stanislav Sukhina

21 September 2008 22	Spartak Moscow	0 – 1	Rubin Kazan	Moscow
18:00 MSK (UTC+3)	Saenko (yellow card) 24'; Bystrov (yellow card) 90+'	Report	Rebrov 15'; Bukharov (yellow card) 27'; Ryazantsev (yellow card) 70'; Kvirkvelia (yellow card) 76'	Stadium: Luzhniki Stadium; Attendance: 17,000; Referee: Nikolai Ivanov

28 September 2008 23	Rubin Kazan	0 – 1	Moscow	Kazan
18:00 MSK (UTC+3)	Semak (yellow card) 61'; Sharonov (yellow card) 87'	Report	Česnauskis (yellow card) 25'; Bracamonte 40'; Goore (yellow card) 47'; Bystrov (yellow card) 67'	Stadium: Central Stadium; Attendance: 12,000; Referee: Aleksandr Gvardis

4 October 2008 24	Rubin Kazan	3 – 0	Spartak Nalchik	Kazan
19:00 MSK (UTC+3)	Bukharov 1'; Milošević 15', 53'	Report	Amisulashvili (yellow card) 55'	Stadium: Central Stadium; Attendance: 15,000; Referee: Almir Kayumov

18 October 2008 25	Shinnik Yaroslavl	0 – 2	Rubin Kazan	Yaroslavl
14:30 MSK (UTC+3)	Ushenin (yellow card) 68'	Report	Sharonov (yellow card) 12'; Noboa 38'; Milošević (yellow card) 62'; Rebrov (yellow card) 71' (goal) 84'	Stadium: Shinnik Stadium; Attendance: 5,000; Referee: Aleksei Nikolaev

25 October 2008 26	Rubin Kazan	3 – 0	Krylia Sovetov	Kazan
14:00 MSK (UTC+3)	Ansaldi 34'; Bukharov 47'; Kobenko (yellow card) 62'; Noboa 66'	Report	Booth (yellow card) 38'	Stadium: Central Stadium; Attendance: 18,500; Referee: Alexander Kolobaev

2 November 2008 27	Saturn Ramenskoye	1 – 2	Rubin Kazan	Ramenskoye
14:15 MSK (UTC+3)	Okoronkwo (yellow card) 29'; Nakhushev (yellow card) 68'; Nemov 80'	Report	Kvirkvelia (yellow card) 53'; Rebrov (yellow card) 68'; Adamov 75'; Tomas (yellow card) 81'; Milošević 89'	Stadium: Saturn Stadium; Attendance: 9,000; Referee: Nikolai Ivanov

9 November 2008 28	Rubin Kazan	1 – 3	Terek Grozny	Kazan
19:00 MSK (UTC+3)	Fyodorov (yellow card) 5'; Semak 28'; Kobenko (yellow card) 18'; Sharonov (yellow card) 76'	Report	Bendz 32'; Mărgăritescu (yellow card) 44'; Zabavník (yellow card) 72'; Petre 82', 86'	Stadium: Central Stadium; Attendance: 24,500; Referee: Sergei Karasev

16 November 2008 29	CSKA Moscow	4 – 0	Rubin Kazan	Moscow
14:00 MSK (UTC+3)	Rahimić (yellow card) 40'; Vágner Love 54', 76', 80' (yellow card) 77'; Dzagoev (yellow card) 67'; Zhirkov 87'	Report	Balyaikin (yellow card) 7'; Noboa (yellow card) 42'; Sharonov (yellow card) 45'; Kobenko (yellow card) 45'; Adamov (yellow card) 45'	Stadium: Luzhniki Stadium; Attendance: 9,500; Referee: Aleksandr Gvardis

22 November 2008 30	Rubin Kazan	1 – 2	Lokomotiv Moscow	Kazan
14:00 MSK (UTC+3)	Bukharov 36'; Balyaikin (yellow card) 65'; Orekhov (yellow card) 68'; Sibaya (yellow card) 82'; Rebrov (yellow card) 90+'	Report	Kambolov (yellow card) 10'; Odemwingie 15'; Gurenko (yellow card) 20'; Rodolfo (yellow card) 27'; Cociș (yellow card) 58' (yellow-red card) 82'; Glushakov 90+'	Stadium: Central Stadium; Attendance: 22,000; Referee: Stanislav Sukhina

==== League table ====
Pos	Team	Pld	W	D	L	GF	GA	GD	Pts	Qualification or relegation
1	Rubin Kazan (C)	30	18	6	6	44	26	+18	60	Qualification to Champions League group stage
2	CSKA Moscow	30	16	8	6	53	24	+29	56	Qualification to Champions League group stage
3	Dynamo Moscow	30	15	9	6	41	29	+12	54	Qualification to Champions League third qualifying round
4	Amkar Perm	30	14	9	7	31	22	+9	51	Qualification to Europa League play-off round
5	Zenit St. Petersburg	30	12	12	6	59	37	+22	48 (Note: Zenit St. Petersburg ahead of Krylia Sovetov on head-to-head points; Zenit St. Petersburg–Krylia Sovetov 1–1, Krylia Sovetov–Zenit St. Petersburg 0–3.)	Qualification to Europa League play-off round

Source: RFPL (in Russian)
Rules for classification: 1st points; 2nd matches won; 3rd head-to-head (points, matches won, goal difference, goals scored, away goals scored); 4th goal difference; 5th goals scored; 6th away goals scored; 7th position in previous season or decision game
(C) Champions

=== Russian Cup ===
==== 2008-09 ====
6 August 2008 Round of 32	Smena Komsomolsk-na-Amure	1 – 1 (a.e.t.) (3 – 5 p)	Rubin Kazan	Komsomolsk-on-Amur
12:00 MSK (UTC+3)	Lodis (yellow card) 21' (goal) 40' (pen.); I.Puzan (yellow card) 27'; Gorbatyuk (yellow card) 53'; A.Nekrasov (yellow card) 88'; R.Malahov (yellow card) 95'	Report	Galiulin 15'; Klimov (yellow card) 20'; Bikchantayev (yellow card) 38'; Kozko (yellow card) 40'; Balyaikin (yellow card) 116'	Stadium: Vanguard Stadium; Attendance: 6,800; Referee: Evgeny Turbin
	Penalties
	A.Sapezhnikov (penalty scored); Lodis (penalty missed); Gorbatyuk (penalty scored); I.Levin (penalty scored)		(penalty scored) Mishchenko; (penalty scored) Fyodorov; (penalty scored) Balyaikin; (penalty scored) Mirzaev; (penalty scored) Klimov

24 September 2008 Round of 16	Rubin Kazan	0 – 0 (a.e.t.) (4 – 1 p)	Amkar Perm	Kazan
19:00 MSK (UTC+3)	Noboa (yellow card) 54'; Orekhov (yellow card) 64'; Jefthon (yellow card) 82'; Kobenko (yellow card) 90+'	Report	Fedoriv (yellow card) 31'; Milovanović (yellow card) 35'; Dujmović (yellow card) 51'; Starkov (yellow card) 68'; Sirakov (yellow card) 89'; Belorukov (yellow card) 90'; Zhilyayev (yellow card) 114'	Stadium: Central Stadium; Attendance: 8,500; Referee: Vyacheslav Kharlamov
	Penalties
	Milošević (penalty scored); Ansaldi (penalty scored); Adamov (penalty scored); Kobenko (penalty scored)		(penalty missed) Sirakov; (penalty missed) Drinčić; (penalty scored) Cherenchikov

The Quarterfinal game took place during the 2009 season.

== Squad statistics ==
As of match played 22 November 2008

=== Appearances and goals ===
No.	Pos	Nat	Player	Total		Premier League		2008–09 Russian Cup	
No.	Pos	Nat	Player	Apps	Goals	Apps	Goals	Apps	Goals
1	GK	(Russia) RUS	Sergei Kozko	7	0	5+1	0	1	0
2	DF	(Croatia) CRO	Stjepan Tomas	20	0	19	0	1	0
3	DF	(Argentina) ARG	Cristian Ansaldi	28	1	26+1	1	1	0
4	DF	(Brazil) BRA	Jefthon	4	0	1+1	0	2	0
5	DF	(Uzbekistan) UZB	Andrei Fyodorov	3	0	1	0	2	0
6	MF	(South Africa) RSA	MacBeth Sibaya	26	0	23+2	0	0+1	0
7	MF	(Russia) RUS	Sergei Semak	27	5	27	5	0	0
9	DF	(Georgia (country)) GEO	Lasha Salukvadze	15	0	11+4	0	0	0
10	MF	(Russia) RUS	Andrei Kobenko	18	2	12+5	2	1	0
11	FW	(Russia) RUS	Aleksandr Bukharov	20	6	11+9	6	0	0
14	FW	(Ukraine) UKR	Serhii Rebrov	24	5	20+4	5	0	0
15	MF	(Russia) RUS	Aleksandr Ryazantsev	22	1	18+4	1	0	0
16	MF	(Ecuador) ECU	Christian Noboa	22	6	17+4	6	1	0
19	FW	(Serbia) SRB	Savo Milošević	17	3	7+9	3	1	0
21	FW	(Russia) RUS	Roman Adamov	14	1	6+7	1	1	0
22	DF	(Russia) RUS	Aleksandr Orekhov	11	0	9+1	0	1	0
23	MF	(Russia) RUS	Yevgeni Balyaikin	12	0	4+6	0	1+1	0
24	DF	(Russia) RUS	Aleksei Popov	7	0	6+1	0	0	0
27	DF	(Georgia (country)) GEO	Davit Kvirkvelia	24	3	24	3	0	0
43	MF	(Russia) RUS	Aleksei Kotlyarov	1	0	0	0	1	0
44	DF	(Russia) RUS	Igor Klimov	1	0	0	0	1	0
48	MF	(Uzbekistan) UZB	Vadim Afonin	1	0	0	0	1	0
49	MF	(Uzbekistan) UZB	Vagiz Galiulin	2	1	0+1	0	1	1
56	FW	(Russia) RUS	Ruslan Nagayev	1	0	0	0	0+1	0
61	MF	(Turkey) TUR	Gökdeniz Karadeniz	27	6	26+1	6	0	0
67	FW	(Uzbekistan) UZB	Davron Mirzaev	1	0	0	0	0+1	0
76	DF	(Russia) RUS	Roman Sharonov	26	1	26	1	0	0
77	GK	(Russia) RUS	Sergey Ryzhikov	27	0	25+1	0	1	0
81	FW	(Russia) RUS	Ildar Bikchantayev	1	0	0	0	1	0
82	DF	(Russia) RUS	Mikhail Mishchenko	1	0	0	0	0+1	0
97	FW	(Russia) RUS	Igor Portnyagin	1	0	0	0	1	0
99	FW	(Turkey) TUR	Hasan Kabze	24	2	5+18	2	1	0
Players away from the club on loan:
8	MF	(Russia) RUS	Pyotr Gitselov	1	0	0+1	0	0	0
31	DF	(Brazil) BRA	Gabriel	2	0	0+1	0	1	0
Players who appeared for Rubin Kazan but left during the season:
20	MF	(Russia) RUS	Aleksei Rebko	2	0	1+1	0	0	0

=== Goal scorers ===
Place	Position	Nation	Number	Name	Premier League	2008–09 Russian Cup	Total
1	FW	(Russia)	11	Aleksandr Bukharov	6	0	6
1	MF	(Turkey)	61	Gökdeniz Karadeniz	6	0	6
1	MF	(Ecuador)	16	Christian Noboa	6	0	6
4	FW	(Ukraine)	14	Serhii Rebrov	5	0	5
4	MF	(Russia)	7	Sergei Semak	5	0	5
6	FW	(Serbia)	19	Savo Milošević	3	0	3
6	DF	(Georgia (country))	27	Davit Kvirkvelia	3	0	3
8	FW	(Turkey)	99	Hasan Kabze	2	0	2
8	MF	(Russia)	10	Andrei Kobenko	2	0	2
8				Own goal	2	0	2
11	FW	(Russia)	21	Roman Adamov	1	0	1
11	MF	(Russia)	15	Aleksandr Ryazantsev	1	0	1
11	DF	(Russia)	76	Roman Sharonov	1	0	1
11	DF	(Argentina)	3	Cristian Ansaldi	1	0	1
11	MF	(Uzbekistan)	49	Vagiz Galiulin	0	1	1
Total					44	1	45

=== Disciplinary record ===
Number	Nation	Position	Name	Premier League		2008–09 Russian Cup		Total	
Number	Nation	Position	Name	Booked	Sent off (straight red)	Booked	Sent off (straight red)	Booked	Sent off (straight red)
1	(Russia)	GK	Sergei Kozko	0	0	1	0	1	0
2	(Croatia)	DF	Stjepan Tomas	5	0	0	0	5	0
3	(Argentina)	DF	Cristian Ansaldi	7	0	0	0	7	0
4	(Brazil)	DF	Jefthon	0	0	1	0	1	0
5	(Uzbekistan)	DF	Andrei Fyodorov	1	0	0	0	1	0
6	(South Africa)	MF	MacBeth Sibaya	5	0	0	0	5	0
7	(Russia)	MF	Sergei Semak	7	0	0	0	7	0
10	(Russia)	MF	Andrei Kobenko	6	0	1	0	7	0
11	(Russia)	FW	Aleksandr Bukharov	1	0	0	0	1	0
14	(Ukraine)	FW	Serhii Rebrov	5	0	0	0	5	0
15	(Russia)	MF	Aleksandr Ryazantsev	5	0	0	0	5	0
16	(Ecuador)	MF	Christian Noboa	4	0	1	0	5	0
19	(Serbia)	FW	Savo Milošević	1	0	0	0	1	0
21	(Russia)	FW	Roman Adamov	1	0	0	0	1	0
22	(Russia)	DF	Aleksandr Orekhov	4	1	1	0	5	1
23	(Russia)	MF	Yevgeni Balyaikin	6	0	1	0	7	0
27	(Georgia (country))	DF	Davit Kvirkvelia	8	0	0	0	8	0
44	(Russia)	DF	Igor Klimov	0	0	1	0	1	0
61	(Turkey)	MF	Gökdeniz Karadeniz	3	0	0	0	3	0
76	(Russia)	DF	Roman Sharonov	7	0	0	0	7	0
77	(Russia)	GK	Sergey Ryzhikov	3	0	0	0	3	0
81	(Russia)	FW	Ildar Bikchantayev	0	0	1	0	1	0
99	(Turkey)	FW	Hasan Kabze	3	0	0	0	3	0
Players away on loan:
Players who left Rubin Kazan during the season:
Total				82	1	8	0	90	1
