= 2009 FC Rubin Kazan season =

FC Rubin Kazan
2009 season
- Chairman: Farit Khabriyev
- Manager: Kurban Berdyev
- Stadium: Central Stadium
- Premier League: 1st
- 2008–09 Russian Cup: Runners-up (vs. CSKA Moscow)
- 2009–10 Russian Cup: Round of 32 (vs. Volga Tver)
- UEFA Champions League: Progressed to the UEFA Europa League Round of 32 in the 2010 season
- Top goalscorer: League: Aleksandr Bukharov (16); All: Alejandro Domínguez (17)

The 2009 FC Rubin Kazan season was the club's 7th season in the Russian Premier League, the highest tier of association football in Russia.

== Squad ==
As of match played 9 December 2009

No.	Name	Nationality	Position	Date of birth (age)	Signed from	Signed in	Contract ends	Apps.	Goals
Goalkeepers
1	Sergei Kozko	(Russia)	GK	12 April 1975 (aged 34)	Moscow	2008			
29	Nukri Revishvili	(Georgia (country))	GK	2 March 1987 (aged 22)	Torpedo Kutaisi	2006		8	0
32	Yevgeni Cheremisin	(Russia)	GK	29 February 1988 (aged 21)	Neftekhimik Nizhnekamsk	2008		0	0
64	Dmitry Kortnev	(Russia)	GK	16 May 1989 (aged 20)	Youth Team	2008		0	0
77	Sergey Ryzhikov	(Russia)	GK	19 September 1980 (aged 29)	Lokomotiv Moscow	2008		65	0
Defenders
2	Stjepan Tomas	(Croatia)	DF	6 March 1976 (aged 33)	Galatasaray	2007		33	1
3	Cristian Ansaldi	(Argentina)	DF	20 September 1986 (aged 23)	Newell's Old Boys	2008		60	2
4	César Navas	(Spain)	DF	14 February 1980 (aged 29)	Racing Santander	2009	2012	36	1
9	Lasha Salukvadze	(Georgia (country))	DF	21 December 1981 (aged 27)	Dinamo Tbilisi	2005		96	2
19	Vitali Kaleshin	(Russia)	DF	3 October 1980 (aged 29)	from Moscow	2009		24	0
22	Aleksandr Orekhov	(Russia)	DF	29 November 1983 (aged 26)	Kuban Krasnodar	2008		14	0
24	Aleksei Popov	(Russia)	DF	7 July 1978 (aged 31)	Amkar Perm	2008		20	0
27	Davit Kvirkvelia	(Georgia (country))	DF	27 June 1980 (aged 29)	Metalurh Zaporizhya	2008		33	3
31	Gabriel	(Brazil)	DF	4 August 1981 (aged 28)	União de Leiria	2006	2009	45	5
44	Igor Klimov	(Russia)	DF	1 November 1989 (aged 20)	Youth Team	2007		3	0
53	Serdar Iolomanov	(Russia)	DF	17 October 1992 (aged 17)	Spartak Moscow	2009		0	0
65	Maksim Zhestokov	(Russia)	DF	19 June 1991 (aged 18)	Youth Team	2008		1	0
76	Roman Sharonov	(Russia)	DF	8 September 1976 (aged 33)	Shinnik Yaroslavl	2008			
80	Dmitri Tarabrikov	(Russia)	DF	23 April 1990 (aged 19)	Youth Team	2008		0	0
Midfielders
5	Pyotr Bystrov	(Russia)	MF	15 July 1979 (aged 30)	Moscow	2009		14	0
6	MacBeth Sibaya	(South Africa)	MF	25 November 1977 (aged 32)	Rosenborg	2003		141	4
7	Sergei Semak	(Russia)	MF	27 February 1976 (aged 33)	Moscow	2008		61	11
12	Valerio Brandi	(Italy)	MF	10 March 1990 (aged 19)	A.C. Milan	2009		0	0
15	Aleksandr Ryazantsev	(Russia)	MF	5 September 1986 (aged 23)	Moscow	2006		91	11
16	Christian Noboa	(Ecuador)	MF	9 April 1985 (aged 24)	Emelec	2007		73	9
23	Yevgeni Balyaikin	(Russia)	MF	19 May 1988 (aged 21)	Sibiryak Bratsk	2007		35	0
32	Andrei Gorbanets	(Russia)	MF	24 August 1985 (aged 24)	Sibir Novosibirsk	2009		13	1
41	Ilsur Samigullin	(Russia)	MF	6 February 1991 (aged 18)	Youth Team	2008		1	0
42	Rafał Murawski	(Poland)	MF	9 October 1981 (aged 28)	Lech Poznań	2009	2012	10	1
43	Aleksei Kotlyarov	(Russia)	MF	11 May 1989 (aged 20)	Youth Team	2008		3	0
49	Vagiz Galiulin	(Uzbekistan)	MF	10 October 1987 (aged 22)	Traktor Tashkent	2007		4	1
50	Parvizdzhon Umarbayev	(Russia)	MF	1 November 1994 (aged 15)	Regar-TadAZ	2009		0	0
54	Almaz Askarov	(Russia)	MF	1 November 1994 (aged 15)	Youth Team	2009		0	0
61	Gökdeniz Karadeniz	(Turkey)	MF	11 January 1980 (aged 29)	Trabzonspor	2008		59	13
83	Vladimir Chernov	(Russia)	MF	15 January 1991 (aged 18)	Youth Team	2008		0	0
88	Alan Kasaev	(Russia)	MF	8 April 1986 (aged 23)	Kuban Krasnodar	2009		14	1
90	Artyom Kulesha	(Russia)	MF	14 January 1990 (aged 19)	Zenit St.Petersburg	2009		0	0
95	Alisher Dzhalilov	(Tajikistan)	MF	29 August 1993 (aged 16)	Lokomotiv Moscow	2009		0	0
	Fábio	(Portugal)	MF	2 May 1982 (aged 27)	Real Sociedad	2007		9	0
Forwards
10	Alejandro Domínguez	(Argentina)	FW	10 June 1981 (aged 28)	Zenit St.Petersburg	2004		107	43
11	Aleksandr Bukharov	(Russia)	FW	12 March 1985 (aged 24)	Chernomorets Novorossiysk	2005		71	30
52	Ayubkhon Gapparov	(Uzbekistan)	FW	16 May 1992 (aged 17)	Pakhtakor Tashkent	2009		0	0
56	Ruslan Nagayev	(Russia)	FW	14 February 1989 (aged 20)	Youth Team	2008		2	0
67	Davron Mirzaev	(Uzbekistan)	FW	8 February 1989 (aged 20)	Pakhtakor Tashkent	2007		3	0
68	Ilya Kukharchuk	(Russia)	FW	2 August 1990 (aged 19)	Youth Team	2008		1	0
81	Ildar Bikchantayev	(Russia)	FW	2 February 1990 (aged 19)	Akademiya Dimitrovgrad	2008		1	0
92	Wahyt Orazsähedow	(Turkmenistan)	FW	26 January 1992 (aged 17)	Köpetdag Aşgabat	2008		1	0
97	Igor Portnyagin	(Russia)	FW	7 January 1989 (aged 20)	SOYUZ-Gazprom Izhevsk	2008		4	3
99	Hasan Kabze	(Turkey)	FW	26 May 1982 (aged 27)	Galatasaray	2007		52	8
Away on loan
8	Pyotr Gitselov	(Russia)	MF	18 July 1983 (aged 26)	Bodens	2007		13	0
21	Roman Adamov	(Russia)	FW	21 June 1982 (aged 27)	Moscow	2008		29	4
28	Sergei Nesterenko	(Russia)	DF	30 December 1986 (aged 22)	Dynamo Barnaul	2007		2	0
46	Aleksandr Yarkin	(Russia)	FW	29 December 1986 (aged 22)	Dynamo Barnaul	2006		8	0
82	Mikhail Mishchenko	(Russia)	DF	27 June 1989 (aged 20)	SOYUZ-Gazprom Izhevsk	2008		1	0
	Anri Khagush	(Russia)	DF	23 September 1986 (aged 23)	BATE Borisov	2009		0	0
	Aleksandr Kulikov	(Russia)	DF	23 September 1986 (aged 23)	Youth Team	2006		0	0
	Dmitri Shestakov	(Russia)	MF	26 February 1983 (aged 26)	Sportakademklub Moscow	2005		0	0
	Vladimir Dyadyun	(Russia)	FW	12 July 1988 (aged 21)	Youth Team	2007		6	1
Players that left Rubin Kazan during the season
8	Makhach Gadzhiyev	(Russia)	MF	18 October 1987 (aged 22)	loan from Saturn Ramenskoye	2009	2009	1	0
14	Serhii Rebrov	(Ukraine)	FW	3 June 1974 (aged 35)	Dynamo Kyiv	2008	2009	32	6

=== On loan ===
Note: Flags indicate national team as defined under FIFA eligibility rules; some limited exceptions apply. Players may hold more than one non-FIFA nationality.

No.	Pos.	Nation	Player
5	MF	RUS	Pyotr Gitselov (at Rostov until end of the season)
21	FW	RUS	Roman Adamov (at Krylia Sovetov until end of the season)
28	DF	RUS	Sergei Nesterenko (at SKA-Energia Khabarovsk until end of the season)
46	FW	RUS	Aleksandr Yarkin (at Alania Vladikavkaz until end of the season)

No.	Pos.	Nation	Player
82	DF	RUS	Mikhail Mishchenko (at Alania Vladikavkaz until end of the season)
—	DF	RUS	Anri Khagush (at Kuban Krasnodar until end of the season)
—	DF	RUS	Aleksandr Kulikov (at Salyut-Energiya until end of the season)
—	MF	RUS	Dmitri Shestakov (at Istra until end of the season)
—	FW	RUS	Vladimir Dyadyun (at Tom Tomsk until end of the season)

=== Left club during season ===
Note: Flags indicate national team as defined under FIFA eligibility rules; some limited exceptions apply. Players may hold more than one non-FIFA nationality.

No. / Pos. / Nation / Player; 8 / MF / RUS / Makhach Gadzhiyev (loan return to Saturn Ramenskoye)	No. / Pos. / Nation / Player; 14 / FW / UKR / Serhii Rebrov (Retired)

== Transfers ==
=== In ===
Date	Position	Nationality	Name	From	Fee	Ref.
26 February 2009	DF	(Spain)	César Navas	Racing Santander	Undisclosed	
Winter 2009	DF	(Russia)	Serdar Iolomanov	Spartak Moscow	Undisclosed	
Winter 2009	MF	(Russia)	Pyotr Bystrov	Moscow	Undisclosed	
Winter 2009	MF	(Russia)	Andrei Gorbanets	Sibir Novosibirsk	Undisclosed	
Winter 2009	MF	(Russia)	Parvizdzhon Umarbayev	Regar-TadAZ	Undisclosed	
Winter 2009	MF	(Tajikistan)	Alisher Dzhalilov	Lokomotiv Moscow	Undisclosed	
Winter 2009	FW	(Uzbekistan)	Ayubkhon Gapparov	Pakhtakor Tashkent	Undisclosed	
28 June 2009	MF	(Poland)	Rafał Murawski	Lech Poznań	Undisclosed	
Summer 2009	MF	(Italy)	Valerio Brandi	A.C. Milan	Free	
Summer 2009	MF	(Russia)	Alan Kasaev	Kuban Krasnodar	Undisclosed	
Summer 2009	MF	(Russia)	Artyom Kulesha	Zenit St.Petersburg	Undisclosed	

=== Loans in ===
Date from	Position	Nationality	Name	To	Date to	Ref.
Winter 2009	DF	(Russia)	Vitali Kaleshin	Moscow	End of Season	
12 March 2009	MF	(Russia)	Makhach Gadzhiyev	Saturn Ramenskoye	14 August 2009	

=== Loans out ===
Date from	Position	Nationality	Name	To	Date to	Ref.
Winter 2008	DF	(Russia)	Aleksandr Kulikov	Salyut-Energiya	31 December 2009	
Winter 2008	DF	(Russia)	Sergei Nesterenko	SKA-Energia Khabarovsk	End of Season	
Summer 2008	MF	(Portugal)	Fábio	Asteras Tripolis	Summer 2009	
Winter 2009	DF	(Brazil)	Gabriel	Gimnàstic	End of Season	
Winter 2009	DF	(Russia)	Mikhail Mishchenko	Terek Grozny	Summer 2009	
Winter 2009	MF	(Russia)	Pyotr Gitselov	Rubin-2 Kazan	Summer 2009	
Winter 2009	MF	(Russia)	Dmitri Shestakov	Istra	End of Season	
Winter 2009	FW	(Russia)	Vladimir Dyadyun	Tom Tomsk	End of Season	
Winter 2009	FW	(Russia)	Aleksandr Yarkin	Alania Vladikavkaz	End of Season	
Summer 2009	DF	(Russia)	Mikhail Mishchenko	Alania Vladikavkaz	End of Season	
Summer 2009	MF	(Russia)	Pyotr Gitselov	Rostov	End of Season	
Summer 2009	FW	(Russia)	Roman Adamov	Krylia Sovetov	End of Season	

=== Released ===
Date	Position	Nationality	Name	Joined	Date
Summer 2009	FW	(Ukraine)	Serhii Rebrov	Retired	
14 December 2009	GK	(Argentina)	Alejandro Domínguez	Valencia	14 December 2009
31 December 2009	GK	(Georgia (country))	Nukri Revishvili	Anzhi Makhachkala	
31 December 2009	GK	(Russia)	Sergei Kozko		
31 December 2009	DF	(Croatia)	Stjepan Tomas	Gaziantepspor	
31 December 2009	DF	(Brazil)	Gabriel	Chernomorets Burgas	
31 December 2009	DF	(Portugal)	Fábio Felício	Vitória de Guimarães	

== Competitions ==
=== Premier League ===
==== Results by round ====
Round	1	2	3	4	5	6	7	8	9	10	11	12	13	14	15	16	17	18	19	20	21	22	23	24	25	26	27	28	29	30
Ground	H	A	H	A	H	H	A	H	A	H	A	H	A	H	A	H	A	H	A	A	H	A	H	A	H	A	H	A	H	A
Result	W	D	D	W	W	W	W	W	D	W	W	L	W	L	D	W	W	W	W	W	W	D	L	L	W	W	W	W	D	W

Updated to match(es) played on 29 November 2009. Source: See Results
A = Away; H = Home; W = Win; D = Draw; L = Loss

==== Results ====
14 March 2009 1	Rubin Kazan	3 – 0	Kuban Krasnodar	Kazan
19:00 MSK (UTC+3)	Bukharov 25', 55'; Semak 32'	Report	Kaita (yellow card) 82'	Stadium: Central Stadium; Attendance: 12,000; Referee: Aleksandr Gvardis

22 March 2009 2	Spartak Nalchik	0 – 0	Rubin Kazan	Nalchik
16:30 MSK (UTC+3)	Filatov (yellow card) 32'	Report	Sibaya (yellow card) 58'; Navas (yellow card) 90+'	Stadium: Spartak Stadium; Attendance: 11,100; Referee: Aleksandr Kolobaev

4 April 2009 3	Rubin Kazan	0 – 0	Moscow	Kazan
16:30 MSK (UTC+4)	Ansaldi (yellow card) 36'	Report	Grigalava (yellow card) 23'; Vukić (yellow card) 27'; Nababkin (yellow card) 56'; Zhevnov (yellow card) 77'	Stadium: Central Stadium; Attendance: 11,500; Referee: Nikolai Ivanov

11 April 2009 4	Terek Grozny	1 – 2	Rubin Kazan	Grozny
MSK (UTC+3)	Amelyanchuk (yellow card) 19'; Zabavník (yellow card) 54'; Dzhabrailov (yellow card) 64'; Mărgăritescu (yellow card) 76'; Lakhiyalov 90+3'	Report	Navas (yellow card) 5'; Semak 18'; Domínguez 20' (yellow card) 61'; Noboa (yellow card) 42'; Bukharov (yellow card) 68'	Stadium: Sultan Bilimkhanov Stadium; Attendance: 9,500; Referee: Aleksei Nikolaev

19 April 2009 5	Rubin Kazan	3 – 0	Dynamo Moscow	Kazan
19:00 MSK (UTC+4)	Sharonov 9'; Domínguez 20' (pen.); K.Kombarov 77' (o.g.)	Report		Stadium: Central Stadium; Attendance: 15,000; Referee: Stanislav Sukhina

25 April 2009 6	Rubin Kazan	0 – 2	Spartak Moscow	Kazan
14:00 MSK (UTC+4)	Domínguez (yellow card) 39'; Sibaya (yellow card) 43'; Navas (yellow card) 46'	Report	Alex (yellow card) 40'; Stranzl 50'; Welliton (yellow card) 53' (goal) 62'; Covalciuc (yellow card) 55'; Boyarintsev (yellow card) 68'; Fathi (yellow card) 70'; Pavlenko (yellow card) 90+'	Stadium: Central Stadium; Attendance: 25,000; Referee: Vladislav Bezborodov

2 May 2009 7	Saturn Ramenskoye	0 – 5	Rubin Kazan	Ramenskoye
19:00 MSK (UTC+4)	Igonin (yellow card) 22'	Report	Domínguez 27', 43', 48'; Sibaya 54'; Noboa 84'	Stadium: Saturn Stadium; Attendance: 4,800; Referee: Almir Kayumov

11 May 2009 8	Rubin Kazan	4 – 0	Tom Tomsk	Kazan
14:00 MSK (UTC+4)	Navas (yellow card) 7'; Sharonov 23'; Karadeniz 25'; Noboa (yellow card) 36'; Adamov 79'; Kabze 84'	Report	Kornilenko (yellow card) 62'; Ivanov (yellow card) 69'	Stadium: Central Stadium; Attendance: 12,000; Referee: Vyacheslav Kharlamov

16 May 2009 9	Amkar Perm	2 – 2	Rubin Kazan	Perm
MSK (UTC+4)	Carlos 27' (yellow card) 28'; Kushev 42' (pen.) (yellow card) 62'; Novaković (yellow card) 61'; Volkov (yellow card) 84'	Report	Rebrov (yellow card) 18'; Adamov 20'; Ansaldi (yellow card) 65'; Semak (yellow card) 85' (goal) 90+'	Stadium: Zvezda Stadium; Attendance: 11,800; Referee: Aleksei Nikolaev

23 May 2009 10	Rubin Kazan	2 – 0	Lokomotiv Moscow	Kazan
MSK (UTC+4)	Semak 9'; Karadeniz 47'; Domínguez (yellow card) 55'; Adamov (yellow card) 67'; Ryzhikov (yellow card) 69'; Gorbanets (yellow card) 81'	Report	Ďurica (yellow card) 39' (yellow-red card) 65'; Odemwingie (yellow card) 65' (yellow-red card) 74'; Glushakov (yellow card) 89'	Stadium: Central Stadium; Attendance: 15,000; Referee: Ildus Biglov

30 May 2009 11	Khimki	2 – 3	Rubin Kazan	Khimki
MSK (UTC+4)	Zinovyev 9'; Ibragimov (yellow card) 24'; Cvetković 87'	Report	Bukharov 20', 57', 63'	Stadium: Arena Khimki; Attendance: 3,000; Referee: Maksim Layushkin

13 June 2009 12	Rubin Kazan	0 – 2	Rostov	Kazan
15:00 MSK (UTC+4)	Balyaikin (yellow card) 42' (red card) 44'	Report	Akimov 32', 55' (penalty missed) 44'; Cherkes (yellow card) 63'; Gațcan (yellow card) 69'; Anđelković (yellow card) 73'; Hong (yellow card) 79'	Stadium: Central Stadium; Attendance: 10,000; Referee: Vladimir Pettay

11 July 2009 13	Krylia Sovetov	1 – 2	Rubin Kazan	Samara
16:30 MSK (UTC+4)	Shishkin (yellow card) 23'; Koller 32'; Ajinjal (yellow card) 68'	Report	Semak 20'; Ansaldi (yellow card) 41'; Ryzhikov (yellow card) 52'; Bukharov 63'	Stadium: Metallurg Stadium; Attendance: 17,800; Referee: Yuri Baskakov

18 July 2009 14	Rubin Kazan	1 – 2	CSKA Moscow	Kazan
16:00 MSK (UTC+4)	Ansaldi (yellow card) 45'; Sharonov (yellow card) 54'; Domínguez 55' (pen.) (yellow card) 56'		V.Berezutski (yellow card) 42'; Akinfeev (yellow card) 56'; Ignashevich 76'; Vágner Love 79'	Stadium: Central Stadium; Attendance: 23,200; Referee: Vyacheslav Popov

25 July 2009 15	Zenit St.Petersburg	0 – 0	Rubin Kazan	Saint Petersburg
18:45 MSK (UTC+4)	Huszti (yellow card) 10'; Anyukov (yellow card) 17'; Fayzulin (yellow card) 75'	Report	Navas (yellow card) 33'; Noboa (yellow card) 48'; Kvirkvelia (yellow card) 59' (yellow-red card) 63'; Adamov (yellow card) 86'	Stadium: Petrovsky Stadium; Attendance: 21,000; Referee: Aleksei Nikolaev

31 July 2009 16	Rubin Kazan	2 – 0	Spartak Nalchik	Kazan
19:00 MSK (UTC+4)	Sibaya (yellow card) 28'; Karadeniz 37'; Ansaldi (yellow card) 61'; Domínguez 89' (pen.)	Report	Mashukov (yellow card) 52'; Leandro (yellow card) 61'; Radić (yellow card) 88'	Stadium: Central Stadium; Attendance: 15,000; Referee: Alexei Kovalev

8 August 2009 17	Moscow	1 – 3	Rubin Kazan	Moscow
18:45 MSK (UTC+4)	Grigalava (yellow card) 8'; Marenich 53'; Tarasov (yellow card) 60'; Česnauskis (yellow card) 67'	Report	Karadeniz 25' (yellow card) 30'; Bukharov 49'; Balyaikin (yellow card) 63'; Domínguez 84' (pen.)	Stadium: Eduard Streltsov Stadium; Attendance: 5,000; Referee: Aleksandr Gvardis

15 August 2009 18	Rubin Kazan	4 – 0	Terek Grozny	Kazan
MSK (UTC+4)	Bukharov 13', 16', 89'; Domínguez 20'; Kaleshin (yellow card) 43'; Karadeniz (yellow card) 65'	Report	Mărgăritescu (yellow card) 33'; Sadayev (yellow card) 50'; Lakhiyalov (yellow card) 63'; Haimovich (yellow card) 86'	Stadium: Central Stadium; Attendance: 12,000; Referee: Alexandr Kolobnev

23 August 2009 19	Dynamo Moscow	0 – 3	Rubin Kazan	Khimki
18:15 MSK (UTC+4)	Wilkshire (yellow card) 41' (yellow-red card) 68'; Kerzhakov (yellow card) 45+'; K.Kombarov (yellow card) 67'; Ropotan (yellow card) 81'	Report	Bukharov (yellow card) 25'; Domínguez 28' (pen.), 78' (pen.) (yellow card) 82'; Karadeniz (yellow card) 42'; Sharonov (yellow card) 68'; Kaleshin (yellow card) 81'; Ryazantsev 89'	Stadium: Arena Khimki; Attendance: 7,927; Referee: Ildus Biglov

30 August 2009 20	Spartak Moscow	0 – 3	Rubin Kazan	Moscow
16:00 MSK (UTC+4)	Makeyev (yellow card) 16'; Dedura (yellow card) 50'; Parshivlyuk (yellow card) 71'	Report	Semak 33'; Domínguez 39' (pen.); Ryazantsev (yellow card) 54'; Bukharov 58'; Navas (yellow card) 70'; Balyaikin (yellow card) 90+'	Stadium: Luzhniki Stadium; Attendance: 48,000; Referee: Stanislav Sukhina

12 September 2009 21	Rubin Kazan	5 – 1	Saturn Ramenskoye	Kazan
18:30 MSK (UTC+4)	Bukharov 5', 66'; Domínguez 35' (pen.); Ryazantsev 38', 45'; Semak (yellow card) 54'; Kaleshin (yellow card) 59'	Report	Zelão (yellow card) 34'; Topić 51' (yellow card) 51'; Nakhushev (yellow card) 81'	Stadium: Central Stadium; Attendance: 12,000; Referee: Aleksandr Gvardis

20 September 2009 22	Tom Tomsk	0 – 0	Rubin Kazan	Tomsk
11:45 MSK (UTC+4)		Report	Kasaev (yellow card) 72'	Stadium: Trud Stadium; Attendance: 14,5000; Referee: Vladimir Pettay

26 September 2009 23	Rubin Kazan	1 – 2	Amkar Perm	Kazan
MSK (UTC+4)	Domínguez 10'; Karadeniz (yellow card) 90+'; Kasaev (yellow card) 90+'	Report	Sikimić 19'; Kalashnikov (yellow card) 50'; Drinčić (yellow card) 64'; Peev 65'; Belorukov (yellow card) 90+'	Stadium: Central Stadium; Attendance: 12,000; Referee: Yuri Baskakov

4 October 2009 24	Lokomotiv Moscow	2 – 1	Rubin Kazan	Moscow
14:00 MSK (UTC+4)	Sychev 2'; Rodolfo (yellow card) 33'; Odemwingie 35'; Kuzmin (yellow card) 44'; Charles (yellow card) 52'; Asatiani (yellow card) 81'; Guilherme (yellow card) 81'	Report	Ansaldi (yellow card) 48'; Salukvadze 76'; Noboa (yellow card) 90+'	Stadium: RZD Arena; Attendance: 15,210; Referee: Stanislav Sukhina

17 October 2009 25	Rubin Kazan	2 – 1	Khimki	Kazan
18:30 MSK (UTC+4)	Karadeniz 31'; Kasaev 55'; Domínguez (yellow card) 65'	Report	Maksimov (yellow card) 26'; Gapon (yellow card) 29'; Golovatenco (yellow card) 34'; Zinovyev (yellow card) 71'; Akhmedov (yellow card) 85'; Antipenko 89'	Stadium: Central Stadium; Attendance: 9,142; Referee: Aleksandr Gvardis

25 October 2009 26	Rostov	1 – 2	Rubin Kazan	Rostov-on-Don
19:00 MSK (UTC+4)	Šljivić (yellow card) 23'; Gațcan (yellow card) 35'; Petrović (yellow card) 41'; Sheriyev (yellow card) 44'; Ahmetović 47'; Kulchy (yellow card) 55'	Report	Kaleshin (yellow card) 7'; Domínguez 16'; Sharonov (yellow card) 26'; Kasaev (yellow card) 29'; Ansaldi 45'	Stadium: Olimp-2; Attendance: 15,145; Referee: Sergei Karasev

31 October 2009 27	Rubin Kazan	4 – 1	Krylia Sovetov	Kazan
MSK (UTC+3)	Popov (yellow card) 44'; Domínguez (yellow card) 45+'; Noboa 48'; Bukharov 56', 75'; Karadeniz 63'	Report	Kalachev (yellow card) 45'; Koller 61'; Belozyorov (yellow card) 63'	Stadium: Central Stadium; Attendance: 10,000; Referee: Aleksei Nikolaev

8 November 2009 28	CSKA Moscow	0 – 2	Rubin Kazan	Moscow
14:00 MSK (UTC+3)	Dzagoev (yellow card) 37'; A.Berezutski (yellow card) 65'; Shchennikov (yellow card) 69'		Navas (yellow card) 54'; Semak (yellow card) 56'; Domínguez 66'; Noboa (yellow card) 73'; Bukharov 90'	Stadium: Luzhniki Stadium; Attendance: 11,500; Referee: Stanislav Sukhina

21 November 2009 29	Rubin Kazan	0 – 0	Zenit St.Petersburg	Kazan
14:00 MSK (UTC+3)	Sharonov (yellow card) 45'; Bukharov (yellow card) 47'	Report	Križanac (yellow card) 31'; Malafeev (yellow card) 39'; Tekke (yellow card) 45'; Anyukov (yellow card) 45'; Zyryanov (yellow card) 75'	Stadium: Central Stadium; Attendance: 22,000; Referee: Aleksandr Kolobaev

29 November 2009 30	Kuban Krasnodar	0 – 3	Rubin Kazan	Krasnodar
14:00 MSK (UTC+3)	Bairyyev (yellow card) 9'	Report	Kabze 9'; Kaleshin (yellow card) 26'; Murawski 32'; Portnyagin 82'; Orekhov (yellow card) 84'	Stadium: Kuban Stadium; Attendance: 12,800; Referee: Aleksandr Gvardis

==== League table ====
Pos	Team	Pld	W	D	L	GF	GA	GD	Pts	Qualification or relegation
1	Rubin Kazan (C)	30	19	6	5	62	21	+41	63	Qualification to Champions League group stage
2	Spartak Moscow	30	17	4	9	61	33	+28	55	Qualification to Champions League group stage
3	Zenit St. Petersburg	30	15	9	6	48	27	+21	54	Qualification to Champions League third qualifying round (Note: Winners of 2009–10 Russian Cup, Zenit, qualified for the Champions League, that means the loser finalists Sibir Novosibirsk will play in third qualifying round of the UEFA Europa League.)
4	Lokomotiv Moscow	30	15	9	6	43	30	+13	54	Qualification to Europa League play-off round
5	CSKA Moscow	30	16	4	10	48	30	+18	52	Qualification to Europa League play-off round

Source: RFPL (in Russian)
Rules for classification: 1st points; 2nd matches won; 3rd head-to-head (points, matches won, goal difference, goals scored, away goals scored); 4th goal difference; 5th goals scored; 6th away goals scored; 7th position in previous season or decision game
(C) Champions

=== Russian Cup ===
==== 2008-09 ====
15 April 2009 Quarterfinal	Rubin Kazan	2 – 0	Sibir Novosibirsk	Kazan
19:00 MSK (UTC+4)	Adamov 33'; Bystrov (yellow card) 36'; Noboa (yellow card) 71'; Gorbanets 86'	Report	Degtyaryov (yellow card) 19'; Shestakov (yellow card) 35'; Zuyev (yellow card) 67'	Stadium: Central; Attendance: 3,500; Referee: Vyacheslav Popov

6 May 2009 Semifinal	Moscow	0 – 1	Rubin Kazan	Moscow
18:30 MSK (UTC+4)	Bracamonte (yellow card) 12'; Epureanu (yellow card) 18'; Strelkov (yellow card) 80'	Report	Domínguez (yellow card) 17'; Rebrov (yellow card) 20'; Ryazantsev 49' (yellow card) 63'; Popov (yellow card) 81'	Stadium: Eduard Streltsov Stadium; Attendance: 5,000; Referee: Nikolai Ivanov

===== Final =====
31 May 2009	Rubin Kazan	0 – 1	CSKA Moscow	Khimki
14:00 MSK (UTC+3)	Ryazantsev (yellow card) 22'; Noboa (yellow card) 36'; Balyaikin (yellow card) 59'; Karadeniz (yellow card) 78'; Navas (yellow card) 82'; Sharonov (yellow card) 89'	Report	Mamayev (red card) 13'; Aldonin (yellow card) 56' (goal) 90+2'; Zhirkov (yellow card) 90'	Stadium: Arena Khimki; Attendance: 16,500; Referee: Stanislav Sukhina

Rubin Kazan
CSKA

FC Rubin Kazan:
GK	77	(Russia) Sergey Ryzhikov
DF	3	(Argentina) Cristian Ansaldi
DF	4	(Spain) César Navas	(yellow card) 82'
DF	76	(Russia) Roman Sharonov (c)	(yellow card) 89'
MF	6	(South Africa) MacBeth Sibaya
MF	15	(Russia) Aleksandr Ryazantsev	(yellow card) 22' (substituted off) 76'
MF	16	(Ecuador) Christian Noboa	(yellow card) 36'
MF	23	(Russia) Yevgeni Balyaikin	(yellow card) 59'
MF	61	(Turkey) Gökdeniz Karadeniz	(yellow card) 78'
FW	10	(Argentina) Alejandro Damián Domínguez
FW	99	(Turkey) Hasan Kabze	(substituted off) 86'
Substitutes:
GK	1	(Russia) Sergei Kozko
DF	2	(Croatia) Stjepan Tomas
DF	22	(Russia) Aleksandr Orekhov
MF	5	(Russia) Pyotr Bystrov	(substituted on) 86'
MF	14	(Ukraine) Serhii Rebrov
FW	11	(Russia) Aleksandr Bukharov	(substituted on) 76'
FW	21	(Russia) Roman Adamov
Manager:
(Turkmenistan) Kurban Berdyev Assistant referees: Oleg Tselovalnikov (Astrakhan); Sergei Panteleyev (Tula)

PFC CSKA Moscow:
GK	35	(Russia) Igor Akinfeev (c)
DF	2	(Lithuania) Deividas Šemberas
DF	4	(Russia) Sergei Ignashevich
DF	24	(Russia) Vasili Berezutski
DF	42	(Russia) Georgi Schennikov
MF	11	(Russia) Pavel Mamayev	(red card) 13'
MF	18	(Russia) Yuri Zhirkov	(yellow card) 90'
MF	22	(Russia) Evgeni Aldonin	(yellow card) 56'
FW	7	(Brazil) Daniel Carvalho	(substituted off) 90'
FW	9	(Brazil) Vágner Love
FW	12	(Niger) Moussa Maâzou	(substituted off) 72'
Substitutes:
GK	33	(Russia) Yevgeny Pomazan
DF	6	(Russia) Aleksei Berezutski	(substituted on) 90'
DF	15	(Nigeria) Chidi Odiah
MF	10	(Russia) Alan Dzagoev
MF	17	(Serbia) Miloš Krasić	(substituted on) 72'
MF	88	(Turkey) Caner Erkin
FW	89	(Czech Republic) Tomáš Necid
Manager:
(Brazil) Zico

==== 2009-10 ====
15 July 2009 Round of 32	Volga Tver	4 – 3 (a.e.t.)	Rubin Kazan	Tver
18:30 MSK (UTC+3)	Belov (yellow card) 21' (yellow-red card) 89' (goal) 54'; Belkin (yellow card) 56'; M.Sorokin (yellow card) 62'; D.Novitsky 80'; Petrenko 97'; Sapogov 108'	Report	Portnyagin 23', 34'; Kvirkvelia (yellow card) 71'; Orazsähedow (yellow card) 96'; Tomas 111'	Stadium: Khimik Stadium; Attendance: 7,875; Referee: Yuri Rubtsov

=== UEFA Champions League ===
==== Group stage ====
Pos	Team	Pld	W	D	L	GF	GA	GD	Pts	Qualification
1	(Spain) Barcelona	6	3	2	1	7	3	+4	11	Advance to knockout phase
2	(Italy) Inter Milan	6	2	3	1	7	6	+1	9	Advance to knockout phase
3	(Russia) Rubin Kazan	6	1	3	2	4	7	−3	6	Transfer to Europa League
4	(Ukraine) Dynamo Kyiv	6	1	2	3	7	9	−2	5	

Source: RSSSF

16 September 2009 1	Dynamo Kyiv (Ukraine)	3 – 1	(Russia) Rubin Kazan	Kyiv, Ukraine
22:45 MSK (UTC+4)	Milevskyi (yellow card) 62' Yussuf 71'; Magrão 79' (yellow card) 80'; Husyev 85'	Report	Domínguez 25'; Sharonov (yellow card) 28'; Ansaldi (yellow card) 68'; Semak (yellow card) 81'	Stadium: Valeriy Lobanovskyi Dynamo Stadium; Attendance: 15,000; Referee: Alain Hamer (Luxembourg)

29 September 2009 2	Rubin Kazan (Russia)	1 – 1	(Italy) Inter Milan	Kazan, Russia
18:30 MSK (UTC+4)	Karadeniz (yellow card) 9'; Domínguez 11'	Report	Samuel (yellow card) 14'; Balotelli (yellow card) 20' (yellow-red card) 60'; Stanković 27'; Maicon (yellow card) 63'	Stadium: Central Stadium; Attendance: 23,670; Referee: Terje Hauge (Norway)

20 October 2009 3	Barcelona (Spain)	1 – 2	(Russia) Rubin Kazan	Barcelona, Spain
22:45 MSK (UTC+4)	Iniesta (yellow card) 43'; Ibrahimović 48'; Alves (yellow card) 88'	Report	Ryazantsev 2'; Gökdeniz 73'; Murawski (yellow card) 78'; Ansaldi (yellow card) 90'	Stadium: Camp Nou; Attendance: 55,930; Referee: Laurent Duhamel (France)

4 November 2009 4	Rubin Kazan (Russia)	0 – 0	(Spain) Barcelona	Kazan, Russia
20:30 MSK (UTC+3)	Semak (yellow card) 73'; Ryzhikov (yellow card) 90+1'	Report	Puyol (yellow card) 75'	Stadium: Central Stadium; Attendance: 24,600; Referee: Konrad Plautz (Austria)

24 November 2009 5	Rubin Kazan (Russia)	0 – 0	(Ukraine) Dynamo Kyiv	Kazan, Russia
20:30 MSK (UTC+3)	Domínguez (yellow card) 56'; Noboa (yellow card) 59'	Report	Shevchenko (yellow card) 37'	Stadium: Central Stadium; Attendance: 23,185; Referee: Felix Brych (Germany)

9 December 2009 6	Inter Milan (Italy)	2 – 0	(Russia) Rubin Kazan	Milan, Italy
22:45 MSK (UTC+3)	Eto'o 31'; Balotelli (yellow card) 46' (goal) 64'; Lúcio (yellow card) 69'	Report	Murawski (yellow card) 28'; Navas (yellow card) 43'	Stadium: San Siro; Attendance: 49,539; Referee: Pieter Vink (Netherlands)

== Squad statistics ==
As of match played 9 December 2009

=== Appearances and goals ===
No.	Pos	Nat	Player	Total		Premier League		2008–09 Russian Cup		2009–10 Russian Cup		UEFA Champions League	
No.	Pos	Nat	Player	Apps	Goals	Apps	Goals	Apps	Goals	Apps	Goals	Apps	Goals
1	GK	(Russia) RUS	Sergei Kozko	1	0	0	0	0	0	1	0	0	0
2	DF	(Croatia) CRO	Stjepan Tomas	2	1	1	0	0	0	1	1	0	0
3	DF	(Argentina) ARG	Cristian Ansaldi	32	1	25	1	2	0	0	0	5	0
4	DF	(Spain) ESP	César Navas	36	1	28	1	2	0	0	0	6	0
5	MF	(Russia) RUS	Pyotr Bystrov	14	0	5+5	0	1+1	0	0	0	0+2	0
6	MF	(South Africa) RSA	MacBeth Sibaya	25	2	21+2	1	2	1	0	0	0	0
7	MF	(Russia) RUS	Sergei Semak	34	6	26	6	2	0	0	0	6	0
9	DF	(Georgia (country)) GEO	Lasha Salukvadze	16	1	8+2	1	0+1	0	0	0	5	0
10	FW	(Argentina) ARG	Alejandro Domínguez	31	18	19+4	15	2	1	0	0	6	2
11	FW	(Russia) RUS	Aleksandr Bukharov	29	16	21+2	16	0+2	0	0	0	3+1	0
15	MF	(Russia) RUS	Aleksandr Ryazantsev	27	4	13+5	3	3	0	0	0	6	1
16	MF	(Ecuador) ECU	Christian Noboa	31	2	21+2	2	2	0	0	0	6	0
19	DF	(Russia) RUS	Vitali Kaleshin	24	0	17+1	0	1	0	0	0	4+1	0
22	DF	(Russia) RUS	Aleksandr Orekhov	3	0	2	0	1	0	0	0	0	0
23	MF	(Russia) RUS	Yevgeni Balyaikin	19	0	5+12	0	1	0	0	0	0+1	0
24	DF	(Russia) RUS	Aleksei Popov	13	0	7+3	0	1	0	0	0	1+1	0
27	DF	(Georgia (country)) GEO	Davit Kvirkvelia	9	0	6+1	0	1	0	1	0	0	0
29	GK	(Georgia (country)) GEO	Nukri Revishvili	1	0	1	0	0	0	0	0	0	0
32	MF	(Russia) RUS	Andrei Gorbanets	13	1	5+6	0	0+2	1	0	0	0	0
41	MF	(Russia) RUS	Ilsur Samigullin	1	0	0	0	0	0	1	0	0	0
42	MF	(Poland) POL	Rafał Murawski	10	1	4+3	1	0	0	0	0	1+2	0
43	MF	(Russia) RUS	Aleksei Kotlyarov	2	0	0+1	0	0	0	1	0	0	0
44	DF	(Russia) RUS	Igor Klimov	1	0	0	0	0	0	1	0	0	0
49	MF	(Uzbekistan) UZB	Vagiz Galiulin	1	0	0	0	0	0	1	0	0	0
56	FW	(Russia) RUS	Ruslan Nagayev	1	0	0	0	0	0	1	0	0	0
61	MF	(Turkey) TUR	Gökdeniz Karadeniz	32	7	22+2	6	2	0	0	0	6	1
65	DF	(Russia) RUS	Maksim Zhestokov	1	0	0	0	0	0	0+1	0	0	0
67	FW	(Uzbekistan) UZB	Davron Mirzaev	2	0	0+1	0	0	0	1	0	0	0
68	FW	(Russia) RUS	Ilya Kukharchuk	1	0	0	0	0	0	0+1	0	0	0
76	DF	(Russia) RUS	Roman Sharonov	33	2	24+1	2	3	0	0	0	5	0
77	GK	(Russia) RUS	Sergey Ryzhikov	38	0	29	0	3	0	0	0	6	0
88	MF	(Russia) RUS	Alan Kasaev	14	1	6+4	1	0	0	0	0	0+4	0
92	FW	(Turkmenistan) TKM	Wahyt Orazsähedow	1	0	0	0	0	0	0+1	0	0	0
97	FW	(Russia) RUS	Igor Portnyagin	3	3	0+2	1	0	0	1	2	0	0
99	FW	(Turkey) TUR	Hasan Kabze	17	2	2+11	2	2+1	0	1	0	0	0
Players away from the club on loan:
21	FW	(Russia) RUS	Roman Adamov	15	3	9+4	2	1+1	1	0	0	0	0
Players who appeared for Rubin Kazan but left during the season:
8	MF	(Russia) RUS	Makhach Gadzhiyev	1	0	1	0	0	0	0	0	0	0
14	FW	(Ukraine) UKR	Serhii Rebrov	8	1	3+4	0	1	1	0	0	0	0

=== Goal scorers ===
Place	Position	Nation	Number	Name	Premier League	2008–09 Russian Cup	2009–10 Russian Cup	UEFA Champions League	Total
1	FW	(Argentina)	10	Alejandro Domínguez	15	0	0	2	17
2	FW	(Russia)	11	Aleksandr Bukharov	16	0	0	0	16
3	MF	(Turkey)	61	Gökdeniz Karadeniz	6	0	0	1	7
4	MF	(Russia)	7	Sergei Semak	6	0	0	0	6
5	MF	(Russia)	15	Aleksandr Ryazantsev	3	1	0	1	5
6	FW	(Russia)	21	Roman Adamov	2	1	0	0	3
6	FW	(Russia)	97	Igor Portnyagin	1	0	2	0	3
8	FW	(Turkey)	99	Hasan Kabze	2	0	0	0	2
8	MF	(Ecuador)	16	Christian Noboa	2	0	0	0	2
8	DF	(Russia)	76	Roman Sharonov	2	0	0	0	2
11	MF	(South Africa)	6	MacBeth Sibaya	1	0	0	0	1
11	MF	(Russia)	88	Alan Kasaev	1	0	0	0	1
11	MF	(Poland)	42	Rafał Murawski	1	0	0	0	1
11	DF	(Spain)	4	César Navas	1	0	0	0	1
11	DF	(Argentina)	3	Cristian Ansaldi	1	0	0	0	1
11	DF	(Georgia (country))	9	Lasha Salukvadze	1	0	0	0	1
11	MF	(Russia)	32	Andrei Gorbanets	0	1	0	0	1
11	DF	(Croatia)	2	Stjepan Tomas	0	0	1	0	1
11				Own goal	1	0	0	0	1
Total					62	3	3	4	72

=== Clean sheets ===
Place	Position	Nation	Number	Name	Premier League	2008–09 Russian Cup	2009–10 Russian Cup	UEFA Champions League	Total
1	GK	(Russia)	77	Sergey Ryzhikov	16	2	0	2	20
2	GK	(Georgia (country))	29	Nukri Revishvili	1	0	0	0	1
Total					17	2	0	2	21

=== Disciplinary record ===
Number	Nation	Position	Name	Premier League		2008–09 Russian Cup		2009–10 Russian Cup		UEFA Champions League		Total	
Number	Nation	Position	Name	Booked	Sent off (straight red)	Booked	Sent off (straight red)	Booked	Sent off (straight red)	Booked	Sent off (straight red)	Booked	Sent off (straight red)
3	(Argentina)	DF	Cristian Ansaldi	6	0	0	0	0	0	2	0	8	0
4	(Spain)	DF	César Navas	7	0	1	0	0	0	0	0	8	0
5	(Russia)	MF	Pyotr Bystrov	0	0	1	0	0	0	0	0	1	0
6	(South Africa)	MF	MacBeth Sibaya	3	0	0	0	0	0	0	0	3	0
7	(Russia)	MF	Sergei Semak	3	0	0	0	0	0	2	0	5	0
10	(Argentina)	FW	Alejandro Domínguez	7	0	1	0	0	0	1	0	9	0
11	(Russia)	FW	Aleksandr Bukharov	3	0	0	0	0	0	0	0	3	0
14	(Ukraine)	FW	Serhii Rebrov	1	0	0	0	0	0	0	0	1	0
15	(Russia)	MF	Aleksandr Ryazantsev	1	0	2	0	0	0	0	0	3	0
16	(Ecuador)	MF	Christian Noboa	5	0	2	0	0	0	2	0	9	0
19	(Russia)	DF	Vitali Kaleshin	5	0	0	0	0	0	0	0	5	0
22	(Russia)	DF	Aleksandr Orekhov	1	0	0	0	0	0	0	0	1	0
23	(Russia)	MF	Yevgeni Balyaikin	3	1	1	0	0	0	0	0	4	1
24	(Russia)	DF	Aleksei Popov	1	0	1	0	0	0	0	0	2	0
27	(Georgia (country))	DF	Davit Kvirkvelia	2	1	0	0	1	0	0	0	3	1
32	(Russia)	MF	Andrei Gorbanets	1	0	0	0	0	0	0	0	1	0
42	(Poland)	MF	Rafał Murawski	0	0	0	0	0	0	2	0	2	0
61	(Turkey)	MF	Gökdeniz Karadeniz	4	0	1	0	0	0	1	0	6	0
76	(Russia)	DF	Roman Sharonov	4	0	1	0	0	0	1	0	6	0
77	(Russia)	GK	Sergey Ryzhikov	2	0	0	0	0	0	1	0	3	0
88	(Russia)	MF	Alan Kasaev	3	0	0	0	0	0	0	0	3	0
92	(Turkmenistan)	FW	Wahyt Orazsähedow	0	0	0	0	1	0	0	0	1	0
Players away on loan:
21	(Russia)	FW	Roman Adamov	2	0	0	0	0	0	0	0	2	0
Players who left Rubin Kazan during the season:
14	(Ukraine)	FW	Serhii Rebrov	0	0	1	0	0	0	0	0	1	0
Total				64	2	12	0	2	0	12	0	90	2
