= Aleksandr Kulikov =

Aleksandr Kulikov may refer to:

- Aleksandr Kulikov (footballer) (born 1988), Russian footballer
- Alexandr Kulikov (canoeist) (born 1997), Kazakhstani slalom canoeist
- Aleksandr Kulikov (ice hockey), Soviet and Russian ice hockey player and coach in 1976 Canada Cup
