= Serhiy Rebrov =

Ukrainian footballer (born 1974)

Serhii Rebrov
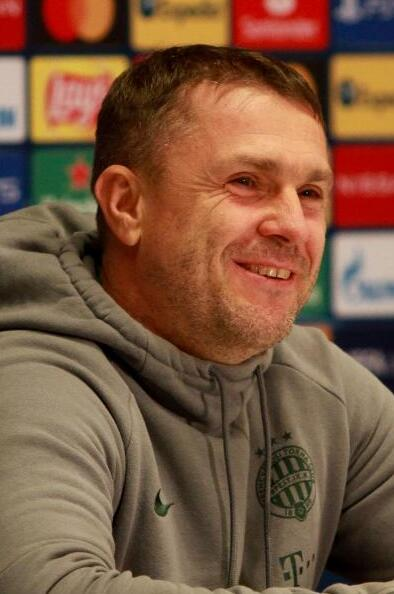
- Rebrov as manager of Ferencváros in 2020

Personal information
- Full name: Serhiy Stanislavovych Rebrov
- Date of birth: 3 June 1974 (age 52)
- Place of birth: Horlivka, Ukrainian SSR, Soviet Union
- Height: 1.73 m (5 ft 8 in)
- Position: Striker

Team information
- Current team: Ukraine (manager)

Youth career
- 1982–1989: Spartak Horlivka
- 1989–1991: UOR Donetsk

Senior career*
Years	Team	Apps	(Gls)
1991–1992	Shakhtar Donetsk	26	(12)
1992–2000	Dynamo Kyiv	189	(93)
2000–2004	Tottenham Hotspur	60	(10)
2002–2004	→ Fenerbahçe (loan)	38	(4)
2004–2005	West Ham United	27	(1)
2005–2008	Dynamo Kyiv	53	(20)
2008–2009	Rubin Kazan	31	(5)
2009	Irpin Horenychi (amateurs)	2	(0)
Total		425	(145)

International career
1993–1995	Ukraine U21	17	(7)
1992–2006	Ukraine	75	(15)

Managerial career
- 2014–2017: Dynamo Kyiv
- 2017–2018: Al-Ahli
- 2018–2021: Ferencváros
- 2021–2023: Al-Ain
- 2023–2026: Ukraine
- * Club domestic league appearances and goals

Serhiy Stanislavovych Rebrov (Ukrainian: Сергій Станіславович Ребров; born 3 June 1974) is a Ukrainian professional football manager and former player who played as a striker. He was most recently the manager of Ukraine.

Rebrov gained international fame as an attacking partner of Andriy Shevchenko at Dynamo Kyiv throughout the 1990s and as of August 2017 is the all-time top scorer of the Ukrainian Premier League together with Maksim Shatskikh.

He debuted for Ukraine in 1992, playing 75 times for the national team, scoring 15 goals. He played in the nation's first-ever World Cup, in 2006.

He finished his career as a professional football player in 2009, after which he worked as a coach. In 2014, he held the position of acting head coach at Dynamo Kyiv, and for the next three years he was head coach. He was the first to win the Ukrainian Cup as a player and coach. He also spent three seasons as manager of Hungarian side Ferencváros from 2018 to 2021. In 2023, he took charge of the Ukraine national team and led them to qualification for UEFA Euro 2024.

== Club career ==
Rebrov was born in Horlivka, Donetsk Oblast. He joined Shakhtar Donetsk as a youth in 1990. In his debut 1991 season, then a 17-year-old, he scored two goals in seven games in the USSR Premier League. In his second season, playing in the newly established Ukrainian Premier League, he became a joint 3rd goalscorer, catching the eye of Dynamo Kyiv scouts.

=== Dynamo Kyiv ===
Rebrov moved to Dynamo Kyiv in August 1992 and has since become the highest all-time scorer in the Ukrainian Premier League. His total tally in the league with Shakhtar and Dynamo is 123 goals in 261 games.

He scored several key goals in European competitions, notably in the 1997–98 and 1998–99 seasons of the UEFA Champions League, including a famous goal against Barcelona from a tight angle. Dynamo reached the Champions League semi-final in 1999, but lost to Bayern Munich on aggregate. In the 1999–2000 season, Rebrov became a joint top scorer in the UEFA Champions League with ten goals (including two goals in qualification games) as Dynamo progressed to the last sixteen before going out on head-to-head record against Real Madrid.

=== Tottenham Hotspur ===
On 17 May 2000, he was sold to Tottenham Hotspur for £11 million, where he managed a modest return of nine goals in 29 games over his first Premier League season, appearing to struggle to adjust to the different style of play in England. Things grew worse for Rebrov after the sacking of George Graham in March 2001, as he was frozen out by new manager Glenn Hoddle, with extremely few first-team starts or substitute appearances.

==== Loan to Fenerbahçe ====
In search of first-team football, Rebrov spent two consecutive loan spells at Fenerbahçe. In his second season there, alongside new signing Pierre van Hooijdonk, he helped lead Fenerbahçe to its 15th title.

=== West Ham United ===
Subsequently, Rebrov signed a one-year contract with West Ham United in the Championship after his contract with Tottenham expired. He scored just once in the league for West Ham, the winner in a 3–2 win over Watford on 27 November 2004. He also scored once in the League Cup against Notts County.

=== Return to Dynamo Kyiv ===
On 1 June 2005, Rebrov became a free agent, after declining to re-sign; two days, later he signed a new two-year contract with Dynamo Kyiv, with the option of a one-year extension. In the 2005–06 season, Rebrov became Dynamo's top scorer with 13 goals, two behind league joint top scorers Brandão and Okoduwa, despite playing in midfield. Rebrov also topped the league in points, with goals and assists – and was named player of the season, according to a poll of team managers and captains.

In July 2007, Rebrov became Dynamo's captain. In the 2007–08 season, he was mostly benched, starting only seven out of eighteen matches before the winter break. His contribution in some games was heavily criticised by the press. It was reported that Rebrov could move to Arsenal Kyiv during the transfer window. However, under new manager Yuri Semin, Rebrov started all games and was named best player at the close season Channel One Cup. In February 2008, Dynamo president Ihor Surkis stated that the club was planning talks with Rebrov, with a view to extending his contract. Shortly thereafter, Rebrov received an offer of a two-year contract from Russian Premier League club Rubin Kazan.

=== Rubin Kazan ===
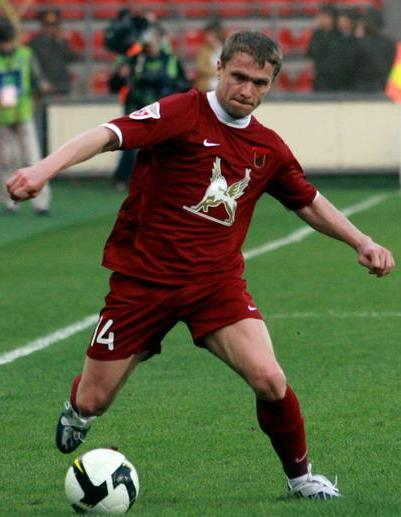
Rebrov playing for Rubin Kazan

On 3 March 2008, Dynamo announced that Rebrov had signed a two-year contract with Rubin Kazan, and would join the new club at the end of the season, in the summer of 2008. With the Russian season starting in spring, Rubin eventually agreed to a $1 million compensation with Dynamo for Rebrov's early release from his contract. He was part of the team that won the 2008 Russian Premier League for the first time in Rubin's history, playing in midfield in 24 out of his team's 30 league matches, and scoring five goals.

=== Retirement ===
Rebrov's retirement was announced on 20 July 2009. At the same time, he became an assistant manager at the Dynamo Kyiv reserves. During his career, he played in various European leagues, with 423 games recorded and 145 goals netted. His career achievements resulted in him being inducted into the Viktor Leonenko Hall of Fame in March 2012.

In August 2009, Rebrov made a brief return to football, by joining amateur club Irpin Horenychi from the Kyiv suburbs. He took part in the 2009-10 Ukrainian Cup where Irpin lost to Volyn Lutsk. In the fall of the same year, Rebrov also played a couple of games for Irpin in Mykolaiv Oblast in the 2009 Amateur League.

== Managerial career ==
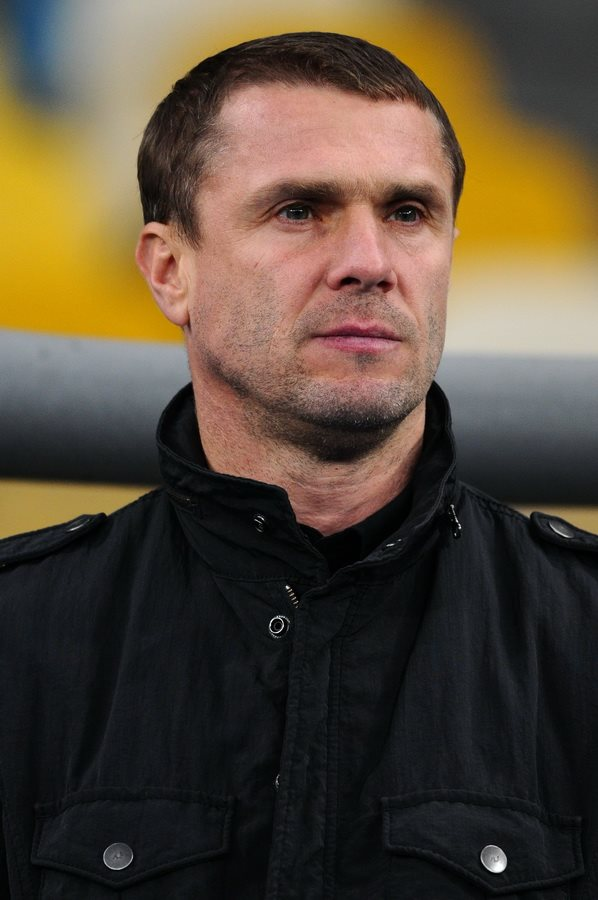
Rebrov managing Dynamo Kyiv in 2015

=== Dynamo Kyiv ===
On 17 April 2014, Rebrov was named caretaker manager of Dynamo Kyiv. On 19 May, after the victory in the Ukrainian cup, he was named manager. During Rebrov's reign as manager, Dynamo Kyiv went on to win two Ukrainian Premier League titles, two Ukrainian Cup titles and one Ukrainian Super Cup. In the 2015–16 season, the team also progressed past the group stages of the UEFA Champions League for the first time in over 15 years, into the knockout rounds. The season before, Rebrov lead Dynamo Kyiv in a successful 2014–15 UEFA Europa League campaign, which included a memorable 5–2 win over Everton in the round of 16-second leg. Rebrov confirmed his resignation as manager on 31 May 2017, following the expiration of his contract, after the club's final game of the season, against Chornomorets Odesa.

=== Al Ahli ===
Rebrov soon returned to management and in June 2017, Rebrov was named manager of Saudi Arabia side Al Ahli. He managed there for one season, until he was eventually sacked for failing to win the league.

=== Ferencváros ===
On 22 August 2018, Rebrov was named manager of Hungarian side Ferencváros, after the club failed to qualify for the UEFA Europa League.

On 29 September 2020, Rebrov guided Ferencváros into the Champions League group stage for the first time in a quarter of a century after beating Molde. The Green Eagles beat Djurgården, Celtic and Dinamo Zagreb in the previous three rounds of qualification to set up a meeting with the Norwegian champions. After a 3–3 draw in Norway in the first leg, Ferencváros held out for a 0–0 draw in Budapest in the second leg, which meant a victory on away goals, and thus qualification to the promised land of the group stage was secured for the first time in 25 years.

On 4 June 2021, Ferencváros announced his resignation as coach of the club, thanking him for his contribution to winning three consecutive league titles, and for guiding the club both to the UEFA Europa League group stage, in 2019, and to the Champions League group stage, in the following year.

=== Al-Ain ===
On 7 June 2021, Al Ain from the United Arab Emirates announced his appointment as manager.

=== Ukraine ===
On 7 June 2023, Rebrov became the manager of the Ukraine national football team. On 22 April 2026, the Ukrainian Association of Football announced Rebrov had stepped down by mutual agreement following a 3–1 defeat to Sweden in the 2026 FIFA World Cup play-off semi-final.

== International career ==
Rebrov scored Ukraine's first-ever World Cup goal in their opening 1998 FIFA World Cup qualification group 9 match in 1996, against Northern Ireland. The match in Belfast finished 1–0 thanks to Rebrov's contribution. Ukraine finished 2nd in the group behind Germany, with Rebrov again scoring the winner in another 1–0 victory away to Albania in March 1997, and at home to the same team in August. His three goals helped his team into the playoffs, where they lost 3–1 on aggregate to Croatia.

Rebrov's club exploits earned him a recall to the national team and a ticket to the 2006 FIFA World Cup in Germany, where he scored a long-range shot against Saudi Arabia as Ukraine progressed to the quarterfinals before going down to Italy.

At the time of his retirement on 20 July 2009, he was the fourth most capped player in the Ukrainian national team's history having represented his country 75 times and was their second all-time scorer with 15 goals.

== Personal life ==
Rebrov is a licensed amateur radio operator and an active contester and has been active with the following callsigns: UT5UDX (Ukraine), M0SDX (England), TA2ZF (Turkey) and UT0U (Ukrainian contest-callsign). Most recent call is 5B4AMM (Cyprus) and P3X (Cypriot contest-callsign).

Rebrov has been married twice and has three sons: the eldest one from his first wife Liudmyla, with whom he lived for 16 years before the couple divorced, and three younger children from his second wife Anna, whom he married in 2016 after three years of dating.

== Career statistics ==
=== Club ===
Appearances and goals by club, season and competition
Club	Season	League			Cup		Europe		Other (Note: Includes Super Cup, League Cup)		Total	
Club	Season	Division	Apps	Goals	Apps	Goals	Apps	Goals	Apps	Goals	Apps	Goals
Shakhtar Donetsk	1991	Soviet Top League	7	2	3	1	–		–		10	3
Shakhtar Donetsk	1992	Vyshcha Liha	19	10	6	1	–		–		25	11
Shakhtar Donetsk	Total		26	12	9	2	0	0	0	0	35	14
Dynamo Kyiv	1992–93	Vyshcha Liha	23	5	6	2	2	0	–		31	7
Dynamo Kyiv	1993–94	Vyshcha Liha	10	2	1	0	2	1	–		13	3
Dynamo Kyiv	1994–95	Vyshcha Liha	24	8	6	1	7	1	–		37	10
Dynamo Kyiv	1995–96	Vyshcha Liha	31	9	5	1	2	0	–		38	10
Dynamo Kyiv	1996–97	Vyshcha Liha	30	20	1	0	4	0	–		35	20
Dynamo Kyiv	1997–98	Vyshcha Liha	29	22	7	7	12	8	–		48	37
Dynamo Kyiv	1998–99	Vyshcha Liha	22	9	5	5	14	8	–		41	22
Dynamo Kyiv	1999–2000	Vyshcha Liha	20	18	4	2	16	10	–		40	30
Dynamo Kyiv	Total		189	93	35	18	59	28	0	0	283	139
Tottenham Hotspur	2000–01	Premier League	29	9	5	3	–		2	0	36	12
Tottenham Hotspur	2001–02	Premier League	30	1	3	0	–		6	2	39	3
Tottenham Hotspur	Total		59	10	8	3	0	0	8	2	75	15
Fenerbahçe	2002–03	Süper Lig	13	2	–		–		–		13	2
Fenerbahçe	2003–04	Süper Lig	25	2	3	1	–		–		30	3
Fenerbahçe	Total		38	4	3	1	0	0	0	0	41	5
West Ham United	2004–05	Championship	27	1	2	0	–		4	1	33	2
Dynamo Kyiv	2005–06	Vyshcha Liha	27	13	5	1	1	0	1	0	34	14
Dynamo Kyiv	2006–07	Vyshcha Liha	17	6	2	0	7	2	1	0	27	8
Dynamo Kyiv	2007–08	Vyshcha Liha	9	1	2	0	5	1	–		16	2
Dynamo Kyiv	Total		53	20	9	1	13	3	2	0	77	24
Rubin Kazan	2008	Russian Premier League	24	5	1	0	–		–		25	5
Rubin Kazan	2009	Russian Premier League	7	0	–		–		1	0	8	0
Rubin Kazan	Total		31	5	1	0	0	0	1	0	33	5
Irpin Horenychi	2009	Ukrainian Amateur Football Championship	2	0	1	0	–		–		3	0
Career total			425	145	68	25	72	31	15	3	580	204

=== International ===
Appearances and goals by national team and year
National team	Year	Apps	Goals
Ukraine	1992	1	0
Ukraine	1993	3	0
Ukraine	1994	0	0
Ukraine	1995	0	0
Ukraine	1996	5	1
Ukraine	1997	10	3
Ukraine	1998	5	4
Ukraine	1999	10	4
Ukraine	2000	5	0
Ukraine	2001	8	0
Ukraine	2002	7	1
Ukraine	2003	7	0
Ukraine	2004	4	0
Ukraine	2005	3	1
Ukraine	2006	7	1
Career total		75	15

Scores and results list Ukraine's goal tally first, score column indicates score after each Rebrov goal.

List of international goals scored by Serhiy Rebrov
No.	Date	Venue	Opponent	Score	Result	Competition
1	31 August 1996	Windsor Park, Belfast, Northern Ireland	Northern Ireland	1–0	1–0	1998 FIFA World Cup qualification
2	23 March 1997	Olimpiyskiy National Sports Complex, Kyiv, Ukraine	Moldova	1–0	1–0	Friendly
3	29 March 1997	Estadio Nuevo Los Cármenes, Granada, Spain	Albania	1–0	1–0	1998 FIFA World Cup qualification
4	20 August 1997	Olimpiyskiy National Sports Complex, Kyiv, Ukraine	Albania	1–0	1–0	1998 FIFA World Cup qualification
5	19 August 1998	Olimpiyskiy National Sports Complex, Kyiv, Ukraine	Georgia	1–0	4–0	Friendly
6	19 August 1998	Olimpiyskiy National Sports Complex, Kyiv, Ukraine	Georgia	2–0	4–0	Friendly
7	5 September 1998	Olimpiyskiy National Sports Complex, Kyiv, Ukraine	Russia	3–1	3–2	UEFA Euro 2000 qualifying
8	10 October 1998	Camp d’Esports d’Aixovall, Aixovall, Andorra	Andorra	2–0	2–0	UEFA Euro 2000 qualifying
9	5 June 1999	Olimpiyskiy National Sports Complex, Kyiv, Ukraine	Andorra	2–0	4–0	UEFA Euro 2000 qualifying
10	18 August 1999	Valeriy Lobanovskyi Dynamo Stadium, Kyiv, Ukraine	Bulgaria	1–0	1–1	Friendly
11	8 September 1999	Laugardalsvöllur, Reykjavík, Iceland	Iceland	1–0	1–0	UEFA Euro 2000 qualifying
12	17 November 1999	Olimpiyskiy National Sports Complex, Kyiv, Ukraine	Slovenia	1–0	1–1	UEFA Euro 2000 qualifying
13	17 April 2002	Valeriy Lobanovskyi Dynamo Stadium, Kyiv, Ukraine	Georgia	1–0	2–1	Friendly
14	17 August 2005	Valeriy Lobanovskyi Dynamo Stadium, Kyiv, Ukraine	Serbia and Montenegro	1–0	2–1	Friendly
15	19 June 2006	AOL Arena, Hamburg, Germany	Saudi Arabia	2–0	4–0	2006 FIFA World Cup

== Managerial statistics ==
As of match updated 31 March 2026

Team	Nationality	From	To	Record				
Team	Nationality	From	To	G	W	D	L	Win %
Dynamo Kyiv	(Ukraine)	17 April 2014	31 May 2017	137	94	20	23	68.61
Al-Ahli	(Saudi Arabia)	1 June 2017	19 April 2018	38	23	10	5	60.53
Ferencváros	(Hungary)	22 August 2018	9 May 2021	132	82	30	20	62.12
Al Ain	(United Arab Emirates)	6 June 2021	27 May 2023	73	45	18	10	61.64
Ukraine	(Ukraine)	7 June 2023	22 April 2026	34	16	8	10	47.06
Total				413	256	86	71	61.99

== UEFA Champions League goals ==
Number	Date	For	Against	Match	Place	Score
1	17 September 1997	Dynamo Kyiv (Ukraine)	PSV (Netherlands)	A	Philips Stadion, Eindhoven (Netherlands)	1-3
2	1 October 1997	Dynamo Kyiv (Ukraine)	Newcastle (England)	H	Olympiyskiy, Kyiv (Ukraine)	2-2
3	22 October 1997	Dynamo Kyiv (Ukraine)	Barcelona (Spain)	H	Olympiyskiy, Kyiv (Ukraine)	1-0
4	5 November 1997	Dynamo Kyiv (Ukraine)	Barcelona (Spain)	A	Camp Nou, Barcelona (Spain)	4-0
5	27 November 1997	Dynamo Kyiv (Ukraine)	PSV (Netherlands)	H	Olympiyskiy, Kyiv (Ukraine)	1-0
6	18 March 1998	Dynamo Kyiv (Ukraine)	Juventus (Italy)	H	Olympiyskiy, Kyiv (Ukraine)	1-1

== Honours ==
=== Player ===
Dynamo Kyiv

- Vyshcha Liha (9): 1992–93, 1993–94, 1994–95, 1995–96, 1996–97, 1997–98, 1998–99, 1999–2000, 2006–07
- Ukrainian Cup (7): 1992–93, 1995–96, 1997–98, 1998–99, 1999–2000, 2005–06, 2006–07
- Ukrainian Super Cup: 2006

Tottenham Hotspur

- Football League Cup runner-up: 2001–02

Fenerbahçe

- Süper Lig: 2003–04

West Ham United

- Football League Championship play-offs: 2005

Rubin Kazan

- Russian Premier League: 2008, 2009

Individual

- Ukrainian Footballer of the Year: 1996, 1998
- Ukrainian Premier League Player of the Season: 1996, 1998, 1999
- Ukrainian Premier League top scorer: 1997–98
- ADN Eastern European Footballer of the Season: 1999
- Channel One Cup - Player of tournament 2008
- Oleh Blokhin club

=== Manager ===
Dynamo Kyiv

- Ukrainian Premier League: 2014–15, 2015–16
- Ukrainian Cup: 2013–14, 2014–15
- Ukrainian Super Cup: 2016

Ferencváros

- Nemzeti Bajnokság I: 2018–19, 2019–20, 2020–21

Al Ain

- UAE Pro League: 2021–22
- UAE League Cup: 2021–22

Individual

- Ukrainian Premier League Manager of the Year: 2014–15, 2015–16
- Nemzeti Bajnokság I Manager of the Year: 2019–20, 2020–21
- Nemzeti Bajnokság I Manager of the Month: October 2020, December 2020
- Ferencváros Manager of the Decade: 2020
- UAE Pro League Manager of the Month: August 2021, September 2021, October 2021, November 2021, December 2021-January 2022, February 2022, March 2022
- UAE Pro League Manager of the Year: 2021–22
