= Dmitri Belov (footballer, born 1980) =

Russian footballer

Dmitry Belov
Personal information
- Full name: Dmitry Valeryevich Belov
- Date of birth: 28 January 1980 (age 46)
- Place of birth: Tambov, Russian SFSR
- Height: 1.70 m (5 ft 7 in)
- Positions: Forward; midfielder

Team information
- Current team: FC Spartak Tambov

Senior career*
Years	Team	Apps	(Gls)
1997–1998	FC Stroitel Morshansk	33	(1)
1999	FC Slavyansk Slavyansk-na-Kubani	15	(2)
2000–2001	FC Spartak Tambov	71	(12)
2003	FC Gazovik Orenburg	9	(3)
2003	FC Lada Togliatti	10	(1)
2004	FC Vityaz Podolsk	7	(0)
2004–2012	FC Volga Tver	213	(35)
2013	FC Spartak Tambov	8	(0)
- * Club domestic league appearances and goals

Dmitry Valeryevich Belov (Russian: Дми́трий Вале́рьевич Бело́в; born 28 January 1980) is a former Russian professional association football player.
