= Shamil Alimagomayev =

Russian footballer

Personal information
- Full name: Shamil Kamilyevich Alimagomayev
- Date of birth: 13 July 1989 (age 37)
- Place of birth: Makhachkala, Russian SFSR
- Height: 1.77 m (5 ft 9 1/2 in)
- Position: Midfielder

Senior career*
Years	Team	Apps	(Gls)
2005	FC Anzhi-Khazar Makhachkala (amateur)		
2006	FC Anzhi-2 Makhachkala (amateur)		
2007	FC Anzhi-Bekenez Makhachkala (amateur)		
2008	FC Rubin Kazan	0	(0)
2009–2010	FC Anzhi Makhachkala	0	(0)
2011–2013	FC Mashuk-KMV Pyatigorsk	82	(2)
2015	FC Dynamo GTS Stavropol	13	(0)
2016	FC Khasavyurt		
2017	FC Legion-Dynamo Makhachkala	18	(0)
- * Club domestic league appearances and goals

Shamil Kamilyevich Alimagomayev (Russian: Шамиль Камильевич Алимагомаев; born 13 July 1989) is a former Russian football midfielder.

== Club career ==
He made his debut for the senior squad of FC Anzhi Makhachkala on 1 July 2009 in the Russian Cup game against FC Alania Vladikavkaz.

He made his debut in the Russian Second Division for FC Mashuk-KMV Pyatigorsk on 17 April 2011 in a game against FC Energiya Volzhsky.
