= Davron Mirzaev =

Uzbekistani footballer

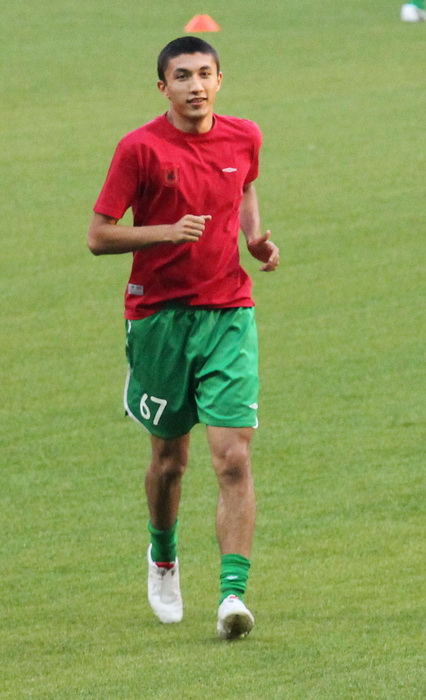

Personal information
- Full name: Davron Bahtiyorovich Mirzaev
- Date of birth: 8 February 1989 (age 37)
- Place of birth: Tashkent, Uzbek SSR, Soviet Union
- Height: 1.80 m (5 ft 11 in)
- Position: Striker

Senior career*
Years	Team	Apps	(Gls)
2006	Pakhtakor Tashkent	1	(0)
2007–2010	Rubin Kazan	1	(0)
2010	→ Khimki (loan)	2	(0)
2011–2013	Neftekhimik Nizhnekamsk	32	(5)
2014	Istiklol	5	(1)
2015	Regar-TadAZ		
2015	Rubin Yalta	10	(0)
- * Club domestic league appearances and goals

Davron Mirzaev (Russian: Даврон Мирзаев, born 8 February 1989) is an Uzbekistani former footballer. He also holds Russian citizenship.

== Career ==
In March 2014, Mirzaev signed a one-year contract with FC Istiklol.

In November 2014, Mirzaev was reported to be training with Pakhtakor Tashkent.

During the summer of 2015, Mirzaev joined Crimean Premier League side Rubin Yalta, leaving them on 15 December of the same year.

After his release from Rubin Yalta, Mirzaev went on trial with Belshina Bobruisk, but did not earn a contract.
