= Mikhail Mishchenko =

Russian footballer

Personal information
- Full name: Mikhail Vasilyevich Mishenko
- Date of birth: 27 June 1989 (age 37)
- Place of birth: Izhevsk, Russian SFSR, USSR
- Height: 1.88 m (6 ft 2 in)
- Positions: Left back; centre back

Youth career
- Soyuz-Gazprom Izhevsk

Senior career*
Years	Team	Apps	(Gls)
2006–2007	Soyuz-Gazprom Izhevsk	1	(0)
2008–2010	Rubin Kazan	0	(0)
2009	→ Terek Grozny (loan)	8	(0)
2009	→ Alania Vladikavkaz (loan)	1	(0)
2010	→ Ventspils (loan)	6	(0)
2011–2013	Torpedo Moscow	39	(2)
2013	→ Angusht Nazran (loan)	13	(0)
2014	Sokol Saratov	7	(0)
2014–2015	Sakhalin Yuzhno-Sakhalinsk	23	(0)
2015–2016	Tosno	20	(1)
2016	→ Luch-Energiya Vladivostok (loan)	8	(0)
2016–2017	Sibir Novosibirsk	54	(1)
2018–2019	Tambov	18	(0)
2019	Torpedo-BelAZ Zhodino	4	(0)
2020	Taraz	5	(0)
2021	Kaisar	6	(0)
2022	Zhetysu	13	(0)

International career
2008	Russia U19	6	(0)
2010	Russia U21	3	(0)
- * Club domestic league appearances and goals

Mikhail Vasilyevich Mishchenko (Russian: Михаил Васильевич Мищенко; born 27 June 1989) is a Russian former professional footballer.

== Career ==
He made his debut in the Russian Premier League on 15 March 2009 in a game against PFC Spartak Nalchik. In 2010, he was loaned out to FK Ventspils in Latvia, but played only 6 matches there, returning to FC Rubin Kazan after the end of the season.

On 18 February 2020, FC Taraz announced the signing of Mishchenko. He left the club again in January 2021.
