= Fábio Felício =

Portuguese footballer (born 1982)

Personal information
- Full name: Fábio Alexandre Duarte Felício
- Date of birth: 2 May 1982 (age 44)
- Place of birth: Faro, Portugal
- Height: 1.70 m (5 ft 7 in)
- Position: Midfielder

Youth career
- 1990–2000: Farense

Senior career*
Years	Team	Apps	(Gls)
1999–2001	Farense	14	(0)
2002–2003	Olhanense	53	(15)
2003–2004	Académica	25	(3)
2004–2006	União Leiria	58	(10)
2006–2007	Real Sociedad	10	(0)
2007–2009	Rubin Kazan	6	(0)
2007–2008	→ Marítimo (loan)	21	(0)
2008–2009	→ Asteras Tripolis (loan)	6	(0)
2009–2010	Vitória Guimarães	8	(0)
2010–2011	Rio Ave	7	(0)
2011–2012	Marítimo	4	(0)
2012–2013	Portimonense	27	(3)
2013–2014	Farense	27	(0)
2014–2015	Louletano	23	(2)
2016–2017	Almancilense	27	(1)
2017–2018	Olhanense	5	(0)
Total		322	(34)
- * Club domestic league appearances and goals

Fábio Alexandre Duarte Felício (born 2 May 1982) is a Portuguese former professional footballer who played as a midfielder.

== Career ==
Born in Faro, Algarve, Felício made his professional debut with hometown club S.C. Farense, appearing in the Primeira Liga not yet aged 18. He continued to develop at neighbours S.C. Olhanense, in the lower leagues.

After a single season with Académica de Coimbra, again in the top division, Felício established himself at fellow league side U.D. Leiria, helping them qualify twice for the UEFA Intertoto Cup. His solid displays attracted the attention of Spain's Real Sociedad, but he did not settle at all at his new team, and left in the following transfer window.

Before the start of the 2007 season, Felício signed with Russian Premier League club FC Rubin Kazan. He made his debut on 4 March, appearing as a starter in a 1–3 defeat against FC Rostov in the Russian Cup, but lost his place in the first team very soon, playing just two league games since the fifth round and eventually went on to serve two consecutive loans, one of them back in his country with C.S. Marítimo; in an interview, Rubin manager Kurban Berdyyev described him as "a heaven-born footballer, but a coward, not a fighter", criticizing him for his inability to demonstrate his talent during games.

Felício spent the 2008–09 season in Greece playing for Asteras Tripolis, on loan. In mid-December 2009 he agreed on a return to Portugal, signing with Vitória de Guimarães.

He is the father of Afonso Cavaco Felicio, a 13 years old footballer who plays the Attacking Midfielder position at FC Porto.
