= Pyotr Gitselov =

Russian-Swedish footballer and manager

Personal information
- Full name: Pyotr Aleksandrovich Gitselov
- Date of birth: 18 July 1983 (age 43)
- Place of birth: Rostov-on-Don, Russian SFSR
- Height: 1.81 m (5 ft 11 in)
- Position: Midfielder

Team information
- Current team: Bodens BK (manager)

Youth career
- 2000–2001: IFK Karlshamn

Senior career*
Years	Team	Apps	(Gls)
2001–2003	Östers IF	41	(4)
2004–2006	Bodens BK	73	(14)
2007–2009	FC Rubin Kazan	10	(0)
2008	→ FC Rostov (loan)	9	(1)
2009	→ FC Rubin-2 Kazan (loan)	8	(1)
2009	→ FC Rostov (loan)	7	(0)
2010–2011	Mjällby AIF	23	(2)
2011–2013	FC Fakel Voronezh	34	(8)
2013–2014	Rudeš	12	(2)
2014	Husqvarna FF	6	(0)
2015	Bodens BK		

Managerial career
- 2015–: Bodens BK
- * Club domestic league appearances and goals

Pyotr Aleksandrovich Gitselov (Russian: Пётр Александрович Гицелов; born 18 July 1983) is a Russian-Swedish football manager and a former player. He manages Bodens BK.

== Career ==
=== Club ===
During the summer of 2008, Gitselov joined FC Rostov on loan for the remainder of the 2008 season.

== Personal life ==
He is the son of Aleksandr Gitselov, also a former footballer.

== List of Awards ==
2002 – Won Superettan with Östers IF
2005 – Got the award as the best player of Norrbotten (Swedish province)
2008 – Won Russian Division 1 with FC Rostov
2008 – Russian Premier League Champion with FC Rubin Kazan
