= Igor Klimov =

Russian footballer

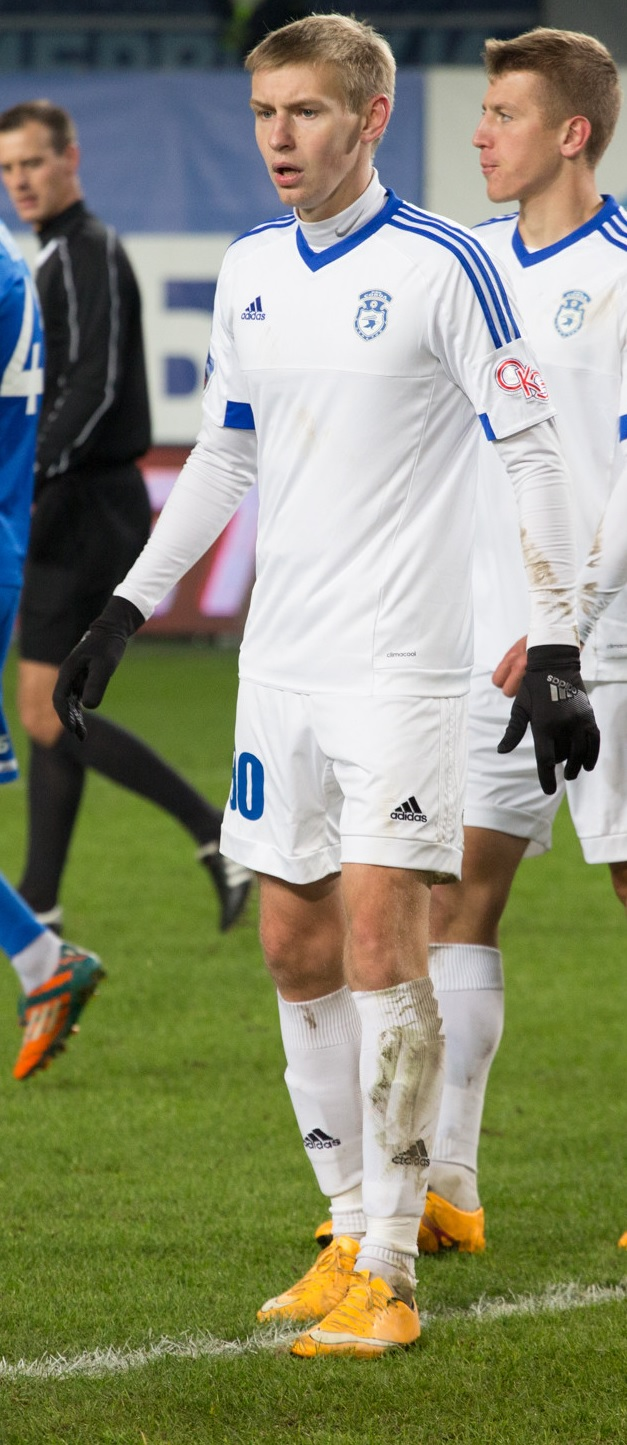
- Klimov with Sokol Saratov in 2016

Personal information
- Full name: Igor Konstantinovich Klimov
- Date of birth: 1 November 1989 (age 36)
- Place of birth: Smolyaninovo, Russian SFSR
- Height: 1.87 m (6 ft 2 in)
- Position: Defender

Senior career*
Years	Team	Apps	(Gls)
2007–2010	FC Rubin Kazan	0	(0)
2010	→ FC Khimki (loan)	35	(0)
2011–2014	FC Sibir Novosibirsk	89	(1)
2014–2015	FC Gazovik Orenburg	16	(0)
2015–2016	FC Yenisey Krasnoyarsk	23	(1)
2016–2017	FC Sokol Saratov	30	(2)
2017	FC Volgar Astrakhan	18	(1)
2018	FC Rotor Volgograd	12	(1)
2018–2020	FC Mordovia Saransk	51	(1)
2020–2021	FC Veles Moscow	24	(2)
2021–2022	FC Tom Tomsk	30	(0)
2022–2024	FC Tekstilshchik Ivanovo	31	(0)

International career
2009	Russia U-20	2	(0)
- * Club domestic league appearances and goals as of 8 June 2024

Igor Konstantinovich Klimov (Russian: Игорь Константинович Климов; born 1 November 1989) is a Russian football defender.

== Career ==
Klimov made his professional debut for FC Rubin Kazan on 27 June 2007 in the Russian Cup game against FC Lukhovitsy. He made two more appearances for Rubin in the following two Russian Cup seasons, but never in a league game.

He made his Russian Football National League debut for FC Khimki on 28 March 2010 in a game against FC Salyut Belgorod.
