= Aleksei Kotlyarov =

Russian footballer

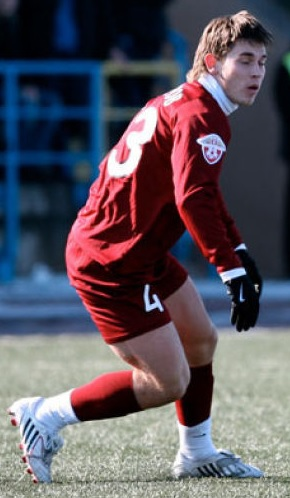
- Aleksei Kotliarov in 2008

Personal information
- Full name: Aleksei Olegovich Kotlyarov
- Date of birth: 11 May 1989 (age 37)
- Place of birth: Magnitogorsk, Russian SFSR
- Height: 1.80 m (5 ft 11 in)
- Position: Midfielder

Senior career*
Years	Team	Apps	(Gls)
2006–2015	FC Rubin Kazan	1	(0)
2007	→ FC Rubin-2 Kazan (loan)	24	(0)
2010	→ FC Khimki (loan)	2	(0)
2011–2012	→ FC Neftekhimik Nizhnekamsk (loan)	31	(10)
2013	→ FC Fakel Voronezh (loan)	11	(5)
2013	→ FC Zenit Penza (loan)	12	(0)
2014–2015	→ FC Rubin-2 Kazan (loan)	10	(1)
- * Club domestic league appearances and goals

Aleksei Olegovich Kotlyarov (Russian: Алексей Олегович Котляров; born 11 May 1989) is a former Russian professional footballer.

== Club career ==
He made his professional debut in the Russian Second Division in 2007 for FC Rubin-2 Kazan. He played one game in the Russian Cup for the main FC Rubin Kazan team.
