= Aleksandr Gvardis =

Russian football referee

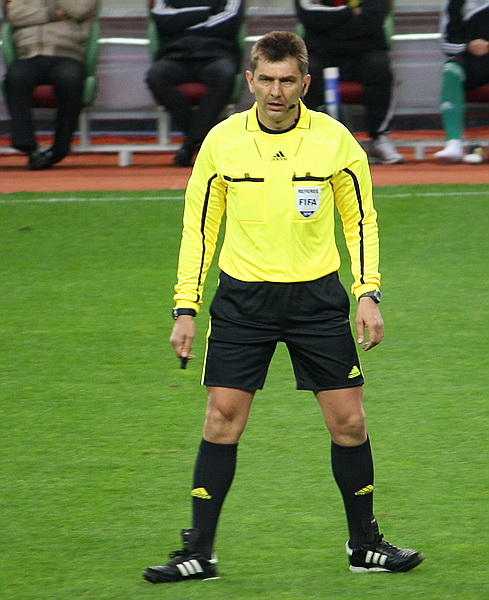
Aleksandr Gvardis

Aleksandr Petrovich Gvardis (Russian: Александр Петрович Гвардис; born March 2, 1965) is a Russian former football referee. He became a FIFA international referee in 2003, and his last known activity as a referee was in 2010. He lives in Kaliningrad and is a businessman. He has refereed games in the qualification rounds for the UEFA Champions League and UEFA Cup, as well as 2010 World Cup qualifiers.

From 2011 to 2014 he was the executive director of the Russian First Division club FC Baltika Kaliningrad.

As of 2024, he is a refereeing inspector.
