= Dmitri Shestakov =

Russian footballer

Personal information
- Full name: Dmitri Vladimirovich Shestakov
- Date of birth: 26 February 1983 (age 43)
- Place of birth: Moscow, Russian SFSR
- Height: 1.75 m (5 ft 9 in)
- Positions: Midfielder; defender

Team information
- Current team: FC Chertanovo Moscow (assistant coach)

Youth career
- FC MEPhI Moscow

Senior career*
Years	Team	Apps	(Gls)
2001–2004	FC Sportakademklub Moscow	98	(1)
2005–2009	FC Rubin Kazan	0	(0)
2005	→ FC Chkalovets-1936 Novosibirsk (loan)	19	(0)
2007	→ FC Spartak-MZhK Ryazan (loan)	8	(0)
2007	→ FC Spartak Kostroma (loan)	12	(1)
2008	→ FC Ryazan (loan)	23	(2)
2009	→ FC Istra (loan)	31	(5)
2010–2011	FC Fakel Voronezh	41	(10)
2011–2012	FC Tyumen	13	(2)
2012–2013	FC Podolye Podolsky district	38	(4)
2014	FC Dolgoprudny	28	(8)
2015–2016	FC Olimpik Mytishchi		

Managerial career
- 2022–2024: FC Chertanovo Moscow (academy)
- 2025–: FC Chertanovo Moscow (assistant)
- * Club domestic league appearances and goals

Dmitri Vladimirovich Shestakov (Russian: Дмитрий Владимирович Шестаков; born 26 February 1983) is a Russian professional football coach and a former player. He is an assistant coach with FC Chertanovo Moscow.

== Club career ==
He played 3 seasons in the Russian Football National League for FC Chkalovets-1936 Novosibirsk, FC Spartak-MZhK Ryazan and FC Fakel Voronezh.
