= Dmitry Kortnev =

Russian footballer

Personal information
- Full name: Dmitry Petrovich Kortnev
- Date of birth: 16 May 1989 (age 37)
- Place of birth: Voronezh, Russian SFSR
- Height: 1.88 m (6 ft 2 in)
- Position: Goalkeeper

Youth career
- FC Rostov

Senior career*
| Years | Team | Apps | (Gls) |
| 2006–2009 | FC Rubin Kazan | 0 | (0) |
| 2010–2012 | FC Rubin-2 Kazan | 47 | (0) |
| 2013–2016 | FC Lokomotiv Liski | 61 | (0) |
| 2017 | FC Zenit Penza | 3 | (0) |
| 2017 | FC Spartak Rossosh | | |
| 2018–2022 | FC Fakel Voronezh | 30 | (0) |
| 2021–2022 | FC Fakel-M Voronezh | 12 | (0) |
- * Club domestic league appearances and goals

Dmitry Petrovich Kortnev (Russian: Дмитрий Петрович Кортнев; born 16 May 1989) is a Russian former professional association football player.

== Club career ==
He made his Russian Football National League debut for FC Fakel Voronezh on 4 August 2018 in a game against FC Shinnik Yaroslavl.
