= Aleksandr Orekhov (footballer, born 1983) =

Russian footballer and coach

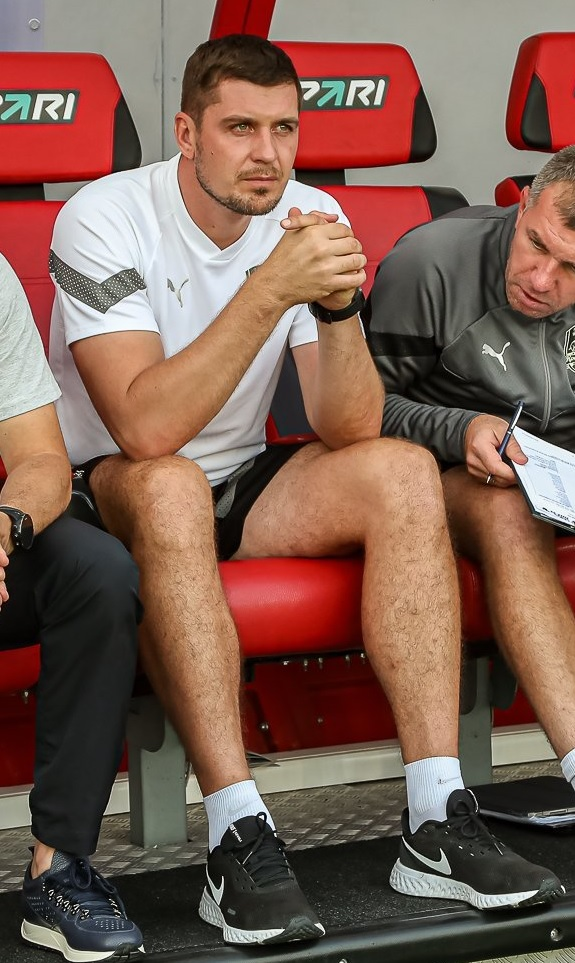
- Orekhov coaching Krasnodar in 2022

Personal information
- Full name: Aleksandr Aleksandrovich Orekhov
- Date of birth: 29 November 1983 (age 42)
- Place of birth: Lokot, Soviet Union
- Height: 1.98 m (6 ft 6 in)
- Position: Defender

Team information
- Current team: FC Arsenal Tula (assistant coach)

Youth career
- 2000: FC Tsentr-R-Kavkaz Krasnodar

Senior career*
Years	Team	Apps	(Gls)
2001–2002	FC Krasnodar-2000 Krasnodar	45	(8)
2003	FC Arsenal Kyiv	12	(0)
2004–2007	FC Kuban Krasnodar	95	(3)
2008–2014	FC Rubin Kazan	31	(1)
2014	FC Tom Tomsk	2	(0)

International career
2004	Russia U-21	2	(0)

Managerial career
- 2015–2018: FC Afips Afipsky (assistant)
- 2019: FC Kuban Krasnodar
- 2020–2021: FC Krasnodar (U19 assistant)
- 2021–2022: FC Krasnodar-2 (assistant)
- 2022–2023: FC Krasnodar (assistant)
- 2023: FC Krasnodar-2 (assistant)
- 2023–: FC Arsenal Tula (assistant)
- * Club domestic league appearances and goals

Aleksandr Aleksandrovich Orekhov (Russian: Александр Александрович Орехов; born 29 November 1983) is a Russian football coach and a former player who is an assistant coach with FC Arsenal Tula.

== Playing career ==
Plagued by injury, Orekhov has not played since October 2010, returning to training in early 2014.

== Coaching career ==
Since 12 August 2019, Aleksandr Orekhov is the manager of resurrected FC Kuban Krasnodar.
