= Ildar Bikchantayev =

Russian footballer (born 1990)

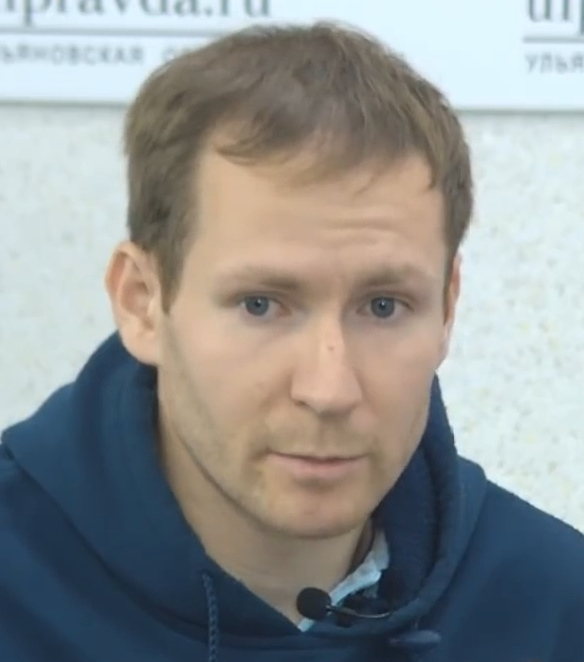
- Bikchantayev in 2018

Personal information
- Full name: Ildar Ildusovich Bikchantayev
- Date of birth: 2 February 1990 (age 36)
- Place of birth: Ulyanovsk, Russian SFSR
- Height: 1.77 m (5 ft 10 in)
- Positions: Midfielder; forward

Youth career
- 1997–2003: FC Rubin Kazan
- 2003–2005: FC Dynamo Kyiv
- 2005–2007: Konoplyov football academy

Senior career*
Years	Team	Apps	(Gls)
2007	FC Krylia Sovetov-SOK Dimitrovgrad	2	(0)
2008–2015	FC Rubin Kazan	0	(0)
2011–2012	→ FC Neftekhimik Nizhnekamsk (loan)	33	(3)
2012–2013	→ FC Gornyak Uchaly (loan)	21	(2)
2013–2014	→ FC Volga Ulyanovsk (loan)	28	(6)
2014–2015	→ FC Rubin-2 Kazan (loan)	23	(1)
2015–2016	FC Zenit Penza	24	(1)
2016–2019	FC Volga Ulyanovsk	69	(5)
2019–2021	FC Zenit-Izhevsk	36	(5)
- * Club domestic league appearances and goals

Ildar Ildusovich Bikchantayev (Tatar: Илдар Илдус улы Бикчәнтәев, Russian: Ильдар Ильдусович Бикчантаев; born 2 February 1990) is a Russian former professional footballer.

== Club career ==
He made his professional debut in the Russian Second Division in 2007 for FC Krylia Sovetov-SOK Dimitrovgrad.

He played for the main FC Rubin Kazan squad in the Russian Cup on 5 August 2008 in a game against FC Smena Komsomolsk-na-Amure and on 13 July 2010 in a game against FC Volgar Astrakhan.
