= Davit Kvirkvelia =

Georgian footballer

Dato Kvirkvelia
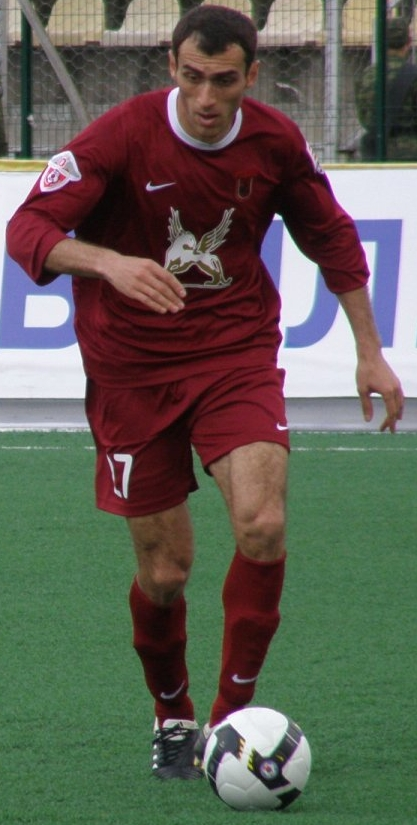

Personal information
- Full name: Davit Kvirkvelia
- Date of birth: 27 June 1980 (age 46)
- Place of birth: Lanchkhuti, Georgia
- Height: 1.84 m (6 ft 0 in)
- Position: Left back

Team information
- Current team: Kolkheti 1913 (head coach)

Senior career*
Years	Team	Apps	(Gls)
1999–2002	Kolkheti-1913 Poti	61	(7)
2002–2004	Dinamo Tbilisi	63	(7)
2005	Alania Vladikavkaz	14	(0)
2006–2007	Metalurh Zaporizhya	53	(6)
2008–2010	Rubin Kazan	31	(3)
2010–2011	→ Anzhi Makhachkala (loan)	13	(0)
2011–2012	Panionios	19	(0)
2012	Anorthosis Famagusta	11	(2)
2012–2013	Dila Gori	29	(2)
2013–2014	Dinamo Tbilisi	27	(2)
2014–2015	Samtredia	25	(3)
2015–2016	Dila Gori	19	(0)
2016–2017	Dinamo Batumi	35	(0)
2018	Rustavi	6	(2)

International career
2001	Georgia U21	1	(0)
2003–2014	Georgia	59	(0)

Managerial career
- 2022: Kolkheti 1913 (assistant)
- 2022–2024: Kolkheti 1913
- 2025: Aragvi
- 2025–: Kolkheti 1913
- * Club domestic league appearances and goals

Davit Kvirkvelia (Georgian: დავით კვირკველია; born 27 June 1980), nicknamed Dato, is a Georgian football manager and a former player, currently in charge of Erovnuli Liga side Kolkheti 1913.

Kvirkvelia is the two-time winner of Georgian top league. He was also a national team member for longer than a decade.

== Club career ==
Kvirkvelia started his professional career at Kolkheti Poti in 1999. Three years later he moved to Dinamo Tbilisi, where head coach Ivo Šušak had already begun his successful period, and won his first title in 2003. The next year he took part in UEFA Cup group stage matches with Dinamo and scored a vital goal in a 3rd round qualifying game against Wisła Kraków.

Kvirkvelia left for FC Alania Vladikavkaz in February 2005 and moved to FC Metalurh Zaporizhya in March 2006.

His next club was Rubin Kazan where Kvirkvelia won the Russian Premier League in 2008, followed by another league and Supercup titles. After several more years spent abroad, he returned to Georgia. Initially, Kvirkvelia played for Dila Gori, who secured their first top-flight medals in 2013. A year later he rejoined Dinamo Tbilisi and added more league and Cup trophies to his tally this season.

Following a one-year spell at Samtredia, Kvirkvelia signed a contract with the recently crowned champions Dila Gori. He played in a UEFA Champions League qualifying round against FK Partizan and helped Dila to seal the third place in the domestic league.

In 2016, Kvirkvelia joined Dinamo Batumi. In this transitional season to the Spring-Autumn system, his team prevailed over Dinamo Tbilisi in a tight contest for bronze medals. But the next season Batumi suffered a dramatic loss in a relegation play-off tie against Sioni Bolnisi, which led to Kvirkvelia's departure for Rustavi. In this club he ended his career as a player at age 38.

== International career ==
Kvirkvelia made his debut with the Georgia national team in a 0–0 draw to Switzerland on 2 April 2003 in UEFA Euro 2004 qualifying.

He played 10 games in UEFA Euro 2008 qualifying.

== Managerial career ==
Kvirkvelia was appointed as assistant head coach at his boyhood team Kolkheti 1913 in February 2022. Four months later he took over as a manager with the aim of securing promotion to the second division. Kvirkvelia not only successfully coped with the task but also guided the team back to the Erovnuli Liga. After ten games in charge of the club in the top division, though, he unexpectedly stepped down from his position on 22 April 2024.

In early February 2025, Kvirkvelia took over 3rd division club Aragvi who had suffered relegation two months earlier. With his team firmly sitting on top of the table six months later, Kvirkvelia returned to Kolkheti 1913.

== Honours ==
=== Player ===
Dinamo Tbilisi

- Erovnuli Liga winner (2): 2003–04, 2013–2014
- David Kipiani Cup winner (3): 2002-03, 2003-04, 2013-14
- Georgian Super Cup runner-up: 2012–13, 2013–14

Metalurh Zaporizhya

- Ukrainian Cup runner-up (1): 2005-06

Rubin Kazan

- Russian Premier League winner (2): 2008, 2009
- Russian Cup runner-up (1): 2008–09
- Russian Super Cup runner-up (1): 2009
- Russian Super Cup winner (1): 2010

Dila Gori

- Erovnuli Liga runner-up (1) 2012–13
- Georgian Super Cup runner-up (1): 2015

Samtredia

- Georgian Cup runner-up (1): 2014–15

=== Manager ===
Kolkheti 1913

- Liga 3 runner-up (1): 2022
- Erovnuli Liga 2 winner (1): 2023
