= Ruslan Nagayev =

Russian footballer

Personal information
- Full name: Ruslan Rishatovich Nagayev
- Date of birth: 14 February 1989 (age 37)
- Place of birth: Kazan, Russian SFSR
- Height: 1.80 m (5 ft 11 in)
- Position: Forward

Youth career
- Elektron Kazan

Senior career*
Years	Team	Apps	(Gls)
2008–2011	FC Rubin Kazan	0	(0)
2010–2011	→ FC Rubin-2 Kazan (loan)	42	(0)
2012	FC Shakhtyor Peshelan		
- * Club domestic league appearances and goals

Ruslan Rishatovich Nagayev (Russian: Руслан Ришатович Нагаев; born 14 February 1989) is a Russian former football forward.

== Career ==
Nagayev made his professional debut for FC Rubin Kazan on 5 August 2008 in the Russian Cup game against FC Smena Komsomolsk-na-Amure. He also appeared for Rubin in the next season's Russian Cup, on 15 July 2009 against FC Volga Tver.
