= Gabriel Atz =

Brazilian footballer (born 1981)

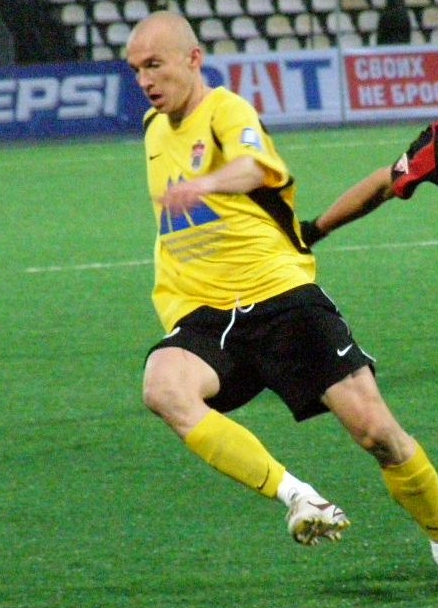

Personal information
- Full name: Gabriel Fernando Atz
- Date of birth: 4 August 1981 (age 45)
- Place of birth: Portão, Brazil
- Height: 1.90 m (6 ft 3 in)
- Position: Defender

Senior career*
Years	Team	Apps	(Gls)
2001–2002	Grêmio	8	(0)
2002–2006	União de Leiria	70	(3)
2006–2009	Rubin Kazan	33	(4)
2008	→ Khimki (loan)	10	(0)
2009	→ Gimnàstic (loan)	6	(0)
2010–2011	Chernomorets Burgas	2	(1)
2012	Caxias	1	(0)
2013	Pelotas	9	(1)
2014	Lajeadense	4	(1)
2015	Brasil de Farroupilha		
2015–2016	Lajeadense	11	(0)

Managerial career
- 2025: SHB Da Nang (assistant)
- 2025–: Vietnam U17 (assistant)
- * Club domestic league appearances and goals

Gabriel Fernando Atz (born 4 August 1981) is a Brazilian former footballer and manager who currently works as assistant coach for Vietnam national under-17 team.

== Career ==
Gabriel played for Grêmio de Porto Alegre since he was 14 years old and reached the seniors in 1999 when he was 17 years old. He stayed at Grêmio until January 2002 and in June 2002 he moved to União de Leiria in Portugal where he played for 4 seasons. In June 2006, Gabriel Atz joined FC Rubin Kazan on a three-year contract. On 29 August 2008, Gabriel joined FC Khimki on loan until the end of the season. In 2009, Gabriel Atz joined Gimnàstic de Tarragona and played for them on loan from FC Rubin Kazan until the end of the Spanish Segunda season. Gimnàstic, however, decided against executing the purchase option after his loan finished.

In 2010, the Bulgarian PFC Chernomorets Burgas signed the defender from Rubin Kazan for an undisclosed fee. On 13 April 2010 he made his debut in a 2–0 A PFG win against OFC Sliven 2000. He made 2 appearances and scored once, but soon after he picked up an injury and was sidelined for one year. After a serious muscle injury in the rectus femoris that took him out of competitions for almost 2 years, he returned to Brazil to play in 2012 for S.E.R. Caxias do Brasil. Then in 2013 he played for Pelotas, 2014 for Lajeadense, 2015 for Brasil de Farroupilha and ended his career for Lajeadense in 2016. In 2017 he started his career as a coach and game analyst at Lajeadense and Cruzeiro. In July 2017 he returned to Portugal to play for Estarreja and complete the football coach training courses. After playing 1 year in Estarreja, he spent 2 more years as Assistant Coach, in the 2018/19 and 2019/20 seasons. Then he stayed for 6 months in the formation of Sport Club Beira Mar as assistant coach of the Under 19, and went to the Seniors of Sporting Clube São João de Ver, where he gained access to Liga 3 as assistant coach in the 2020/21 season. In 2021 he completed his Degree in Sports Science at the Faculty of Porto, and today he holds the UEFA B diploma by the Aveiro Football Association.
