= Sergei Nesterenko =

Russian footballer

Personal information
- Full name: Sergei Sergeyevich Nesterenko
- Date of birth: 30 December 1986 (age 39)
- Place of birth: Yarovoye, Russian SFSR
- Height: 1.77 m (5 ft 10 in)
- Position: Defender

Team information
- Current team: FC Sibir Novosibirsk (fitness coach)

Senior career*
Years	Team	Apps	(Gls)
2005–2006	FC Dynamo Barnaul	49	(4)
2007–2010	FC Rubin Kazan	0	(0)
2008–2010	→ FC SKA-Energiya Khabarovsk (loan)	76	(0)
2011–2013	FC SKA-Energiya Khabarovsk	70	(0)
2014	FC Tosno	10	(0)
2015–2016	FC SKA-Khabarovsk	23	(0)
2017–2019	FC Dynamo Barnaul	55	(3)

Managerial career
- 2020–2022: FC SKA-Khabarovsk (fitness coach)
- 2022–2023: FC Spartak Kostroma (fitness coach)
- 2023: FC Znamya Noginsk (fitness coach)
- 2024: FC Avangard Kursk (fitness coach)
- 2025–: FC Sibir Novosibirsk (fitness coach)
- * Club domestic league appearances and goals

Sergei Sergeyevich Nesterenko (Russian: Серге́й Серге́евич Нестеренко; born 30 December 1986) is a Russian professional football coach and a former player. He is a fitness coach with FC Sibir Novosibirsk.

== Club career ==
He played 2 games for the main squad of FC Rubin Kazan, one in Russian Cup and another in the UEFA Intertoto Cup 2007 against Zalaegerszegi TE.

He made his Russian Football National League debut for FC SKA-Energiya Khabarovsk on 27 March 2008 in a game against FC Sportakademklub Moscow.
