= Aleksandr Kulikov (footballer) =

Russian footballer

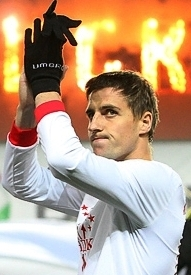

Personal information
- Full name: Aleksandr Vladimirovich Kulikov
- Date of birth: 19 March 1988 (age 38)
- Place of birth: Vologda, Russian SFSR
- Height: 1.86 m (6 ft 1 in)
- Position: Defender

Youth career
- SDYuSShOR-3 Vologda
- UOR Master-Saturn Yegoryevsk

Senior career*
| Years | Team | Apps | (Gls) |
| 2006–2013 | FC Rubin Kazan | 0 | (0) |
| 2008–2009 | → FC Salyut-Energia Belgorod (loan) | 48 | (0) |
| 2010 | → FC Krasnodar (loan) | 12 | (0) |
| 2010 | → FC Salyut Belgorod (loan) | 11 | (0) |
| 2011–2012 | → PFC Spartak Nalchik (loan) | 20 | (1) |
| 2012–2013 | → FC Neftekhimik Nizhnekamsk (loan) | 18 | (0) |
| 2013 | FC Luch-Energiya Vladivostok | 1 | (0) |
| 2014 | FC Avangard Kursk | 8 | (0) |
| 2014–2015 | FC Neftekhimik Nizhnekamsk | 18 | (0) |
| 2015–2016 | FC Tyumen | 20 | (0) |
| 2016 | FC Olimpiyets Nizhny Novgorod | 9 | (0) |
| 2017–2019 | FC Neftekhimik Nizhnekamsk | 54 | (1) |
| 2020–2023 | FC KAMAZ Naberezhnye Chelny | 49 | (3) |
| 2024 | FC Sokol Kazan | 0 | (0) |

International career
| 2007 | Russia U-19 | 4 | (0) |
- * Club domestic league appearances and goals

Aleksandr Vladimirovich Kulikov (Russian: Александр Владимирович Куликов; born 19 March 1988) is a Russian former professional football player.

== Club career ==
He won the 2010 CIS Cup with FC Rubin Kazan.

He made his Russian Premier League debut for PFC Spartak Nalchik on 3 April 2011 in a game against FC Zenit Saint Petersburg.
