= 2010 FC Rubin Kazan season =

Rubin Kazan
2010 season
- Manager: Kurban Berdyev
- Stadium: Central Stadium
- Premier League: 3rd
- Russian Cup: Round of 32 (vs. Volgar-Gazprom Astrakhan)
- Super Cup: Winners
- Champions League: Group stage
- Top goalscorer: League: Christian Noboa (8); All: Christian Noboa (10)
Home colours	Away colours

The 2010 FC Rubin Kazan season was the club's 8th season in the Russian Premier League, the highest tier of football in Russia. Rubin where the reigning Premier League champions having won the title the previous two seasons. Rubin finished the season in 3rd place, qualifying for the Third qualifying round of the 2011–12 UEFA Champions League, whilst they were also knocked out of the 2010–11 Russian Cup at the Round of 32 stage by Volgar-Gazprom Astrakhan. In Europe, Rubin advanced to the 2010–11 UEFA Europa League Round of 32 having finished third in their 2010–11 UEFA Champions League group, behind Barcelona and Copenhagen but ahead of Panathinaikos

== Squad ==
As of match played 7 December 2010

No.	Name	Nationality	Position	Date of birth (age)	Signed from	Signed in	Contract ends	Apps.	Goals
Goalkeepers
44	Giedrius Arlauskis	(Lithuania)	GK	1 December 1987 (aged 23)	Unirea Urziceni	2010		2	0
77	Sergey Ryzhikov	(Russia)	GK	19 September 1980 (aged 30)	Lokomotiv Moscow	2008		104	0
79	Yuri Nesterenko	(Russia)	GK	12 June 1991 (aged 19)	Krasnodar-2000	2010		0	0
98	Ilie Cebanu	(Moldova)	GK	29 December 1986 (aged 23)	Wisła Kraków	2010		0	0
Defenders
2	Oleg Kuzmin	(Russia)	DF	9 May 1981 (aged 29)	Lokomotiv Moscow	2010		15	0
3	Cristian Ansaldi	(Argentina)	DF	20 September 1986 (aged 24)	Newell's Old Boys	2008		91	2
4	César Navas	(Spain)	DF	14 February 1980 (aged 30)	Racing Santander	2009	2012	75	2
9	Lasha Salukvadze	(Georgia (country))	DF	21 December 1981 (aged 28)	Dinamo Tbilisi	2005		114	2
19	Vitali Kaleshin	(Russia)	DF	3 October 1980 (aged 30)	loan from Moscow	2009		47	0
22	Aleksandr Orekhov	(Russia)	DF	29 November 1983 (aged 27)	Kuban Krasnodar	2008		37	1
27	Salvatore Bocchetti	(Italy)	DF	30 November 1986 (aged 24)	Genoa	2010		13	2
31	Mikhail Badyautdinov	(Russia)	DF	11 October 1989 (aged 21)	Spartak Moscow	2009		0	0
42	Marat Doyati	(Russia)	DF	18 February 1992 (aged 18)	FAYUR Beslan	2010		0	0
51	Avtandil Bratchuli	(Georgia (country))	DF	2 April 1992 (aged 18)	Gagra	2010		0	0
53	Serdar Iolomanov	(Russia)	DF	17 October 1992 (aged 18)	Spartak Moscow	2009		0	0
65	Maksim Zhestokov	(Russia)	DF	19 June 1991 (aged 19)	Youth Team	2008		2	0
76	Roman Sharonov	(Russia)	DF	8 September 1976 (aged 34)	Shinnik Yaroslavl	2008			
80	Dmitri Tarabrikov	(Russia)	DF	23 April 1990 (aged 20)	Youth Team	2008		0	0
84	Iskandar Dzhalilov	(Russia)	DF	1 June 1992 (aged 18)	CSKA Moscow	2010		0	0
86	Vitali Ustinov	(Russia)	DF	23 April 1990 (aged 20)	Moscow	2010		0	0
Midfielders
5	Pyotr Bystrov	(Russia)	MF	15 July 1979 (aged 31)	Moscow	2009		26	0
6	MacBeth Sibaya	(South Africa)	MF	25 November 1977 (aged 33)	Rosenborg	2003		153	4
8	Aleksandr Ryazantsev	(Russia)	MF	5 September 1986 (aged 24)	Moscow	2006		111	13
12	Valerio Brandi	(Italy)	MF	10 March 1990 (aged 20)	A.C. Milan	2009		0	0
14	Alan Kasaev	(Russia)	MF	8 April 1986 (aged 24)	Kuban Krasnodar	2009		52	7
15	Rafał Murawski	(Poland)	MF	9 October 1981 (aged 29)	Lech Poznań	2009	2012	40	2
16	Christian Noboa	(Ecuador)	MF	9 April 1985 (aged 25)	Emelec	2007		111	20
23	Yevgeni Balyaikin	(Russia)	MF	19 May 1988 (aged 22)	Sibiryak Bratsk	2007		51	0
32	Andrei Gorbanets	(Russia)	MF	24 August 1985 (aged 25)	Sibir Novosibirsk	2009		33	2
41	Ilsur Samigullin	(Russia)	MF	6 February 1991 (aged 19)	Youth Team	2008		1	0
50	Parvizdzhon Umarbayev	(Russia)	MF	1 November 1994 (aged 16)	Regar-TadAZ	2009		0	0
54	Almaz Askarov	(Russia)	MF	28 October 1991 (aged 19)	Youth Team	2010		0	0
56	Ruslan Makhmutov	(Russia)	MF	27 January 1991 (aged 19)	Tolyatti	2010		1	0
61	Gökdeniz Karadeniz	(Turkey)	MF	11 January 1980 (aged 30)	Trabzonspor	2008		86	14
66	Bibras Natkho	(Israel)	MF	18 February 1988 (aged 22)	Hapoel Tel Aviv	2010		18	2
83	Vladimir Chernov	(Russia)	MF	15 January 1991 (aged 19)	Youth Team	2008		1	0
85	Marat Sitdikov	(Russia)	MF	23 July 1991 (aged 19)	Youth Team	2010		0	0
87	Carlos Eduardo	(Brazil)	MF	18 July 1987 (aged 23)	1899 Hoffenheim	2010		8	2
90	Artyom Kulesha	(Russia)	MF	14 January 1990 (aged 20)	Zenit St.Petersburg	2009		0	0
95	Alisher Dzhalilov	(Russia)	MF	29 August 1993 (aged 17)	Lokomotiv Moscow	2009		0	0
Forwards
21	Alexandru Antoniuc	(Moldova)	FW	23 May 1989 (aged 21)	Zimbru Chișinău	2010		1	0
26	Aleksei Medvedev	(Moldova)	FW	5 January 1977 (aged 33)	Sibir Novosibirsk	2010		16	2
28	Obafemi Martins	(Nigeria)	FW	28 October 1984 (aged 26)	VfL Wolfsburg	2010		17	2
52	Ayubkhon Gapparov	(Uzbekistan)	FW	16 May 1992 (aged 18)	Pakhtakor Tashkent	2009		0	0
57	Anton Saroka	(Belarus)	FW	5 March 1992 (aged 18)	Dinamo Minsk	2010		0	0
81	Ildar Bikchantayev	(Russia)	FW	2 February 1990 (aged 20)	Akademiya Dimitrovgrad	2008		2	0
88	Sergei Kornilenko	(Belarus)	FW	14 June 1983 (aged 27)	loan from Zenit St.Petersburg	2010		13	3
92	Wahyt Orazsähedow	(Turkmenistan)	FW	26 January 1992 (aged 18)	Köpetdag Aşgabat	2008		1	0
97	Igor Portnyagin	(Russia)	FW	7 January 1989 (aged 21)	SOYUZ-Gazprom Izhevsk	2008		9	3
Away on loan
20	Bahodir Nasimov	(Uzbekistan)	FW	2 May 1987 (aged 23)	Dinamo Samarqand	2010		3	0
32	Yevgeni Cheremisin	(Russia)	GK	29 February 1988 (aged 22)	Neftekhimik Nizhnekamsk	2008		1	0
33	Jordi	(Spain)	DF	16 May 1987 (aged 23)	Celta de Vigo	2010		9	0
43	Aleksei Kotlyarov	(Russia)	MF	11 May 1989 (aged 21)	Youth Team	2008		3	0
49	Vagiz Galiulin	(Uzbekistan)	MF	10 October 1987 (aged 23)	Traktor Tashkent	2007		13	1
67	Davron Mirzaev	(Uzbekistan)	FW	8 February 1989 (aged 21)	Pakhtakor Tashkent	2007		4	0
	Davit Kvirkvelia	(Georgia (country))	DF	27 June 1980 (aged 30)	Metalurh Zaporizhya	2008		33	3
	Anri Khagush	(Russia)	DF	23 September 1986 (aged 24)	BATE Borisov	2009		0	0
	Aleksandr Kulikov	(Russia)	DF	23 September 1986 (aged 24)	Youth Team	2006		0	0
	Roman Adamov	(Russia)	FW	21 June 1982 (aged 28)	Moscow	2008		29	4
	Vladimir Dyadyun	(Russia)	FW	12 July 1988 (aged 22)	Youth Team	2007		6	1
Players that left Rubin Kazan during the season
7	Sergei Semak	(Russia)	MF	27 February 1976 (aged 34)	Moscow	2008		71	12
10	Fatih Tekke	(Turkey)	FW	9 September 1977 (aged 33)	Zenit St.Petersburg	2010		7	0
11	Aleksandr Bukharov	(Russia)	FW	12 March 1985 (aged 25)	Chernomorets Novorossiysk	2005		88	37
68	Ilya Kukharchuk	(Russia)	FW	2 August 1990 (aged 20)	Youth Team	2008		2	0
99	Hasan Kabze	(Turkey)	FW	26 May 1982 (aged 27)	Galatasaray	2007		61	8

=== Out on loan ===
Note: Flags indicate national team as defined under FIFA eligibility rules; some limited exceptions apply. Players may hold more than one non-FIFA nationality.

No.	Pos.	Nation	Player
30	GK	RUS	Yevgeni Cheremisin (on loan at Dynamo St.Petersburg until December 2010)
33	DF	ESP	Jordi (on loan at Real Valladolid until July 2011)
43	MF	RUS	Aleksei Kotlyarov (on loan at Khimki until December 2010)
49	MF	UZB	Vagiz Galiulin (on loan at Sibir Novosibirsk until December 2010)
67	FW	UZB	Davron Mirzayev (on loan at Khimki until December 2010)
82	DF	RUS	Mikhail Mischenko (on loan at Ventspils until December 2010)

No.	Pos.	Nation	Player
—	DF	GEO	Davit Kvirkvelia (on loan at Anzhi Makhachkala until Summer 2011)
—	DF	RUS	Anri Khagush (on loan at Rostov until December 2010)
—	DF	RUS	Aleksandr Kulikov (on loan at Salyut Belgorod until December 2010)
—	FW	RUS	Roman Adamov (on loan at Rostov until December 2010)
—	FW	RUS	Vladimir Dyadyun (on loan at Spartak Nalchik until December 2010)

== Transfers ==
=== In ===
Date	Position	Nationality	Name	From	Fee	Ref.
Winter 2010	GK	(Moldova)	Ilie Cebanu	Wisła Kraków	Undisclosed	
Winter 2010	DF	(Russia)	Vitali Kaleshin	Moscow	Undisclosed	
Winter 2010	MF	(Israel)	Bibras Natkho	Hapoel Tel Aviv	Undisclosed	
3 February 2010	FW	(Turkey)	Fatih Tekke	Zenit St.Petersburg	Undisclosed	
17 February 2010	DF	(Spain)	Jordi	Celta Vigo	€850,000	
Summer 2010	DF	(Georgia (country))	Avtandil Bratchuli			
Summer 2010	DF	(Russia)	Iskandar Dzhalilov	CSKA Moscow	Undisclosed	
Summer 2010	DF	(Russia)	Marat Sitdikov	Rubin-2 Kazan	Promoted	
24 June 2010	FW	(Moldova)	Alexandru Antoniuc	Zimbru Chișinău	Undisclosed	
9 July 2010	FW	(Nigeria)	Obafemi Martins	VfL Wolfsburg	Undisclosed	
3 August 2010	DF	(Russia)	Oleg Kuzmin	Lokomotiv Moscow	Undisclosed	
10 August 2010	FW	(Russia)	Aleksei Medvedev	Sibir Novosibirsk	Undisclosed	
20 August 2010	GK	(Lithuania)	Giedrius Arlauskis	Unirea Urziceni	Undisclosed	
24 August 2010	MF	(Brazil)	Carlos Eduardo	Hoffenheim	Undisclosed	
27 August 2010	DF	(Italy)	Salvatore Bocchetti	Genoa	Undisclosed	

=== Loans in ===
Date from	Position	Nationality	Name	To	Date to	Ref.
26 August 2010	FW	(Belarus)	Sergei Kornilenko	Zenit St.Petersburg	End of Season	

=== Out ===
Date	Position	Nationality	Name	To	Fee	Ref.
6 July 2010	FW	(Turkey)	Hasan Kabze	Montpellier	Undisclosed	
19 July 2010	FW	(Russia)	Aleksandr Bukharov	Zenit St.Petersburg	Undisclosed	
4 August 2010	FW	(Russia)	Ilya Kukharchuk	Anzhi Makhachkala	Undisclosed	
5 August 2010	MF	(Russia)	Sergei Semak	Zenit St.Petersburg	Undisclosed	
1 September 2010	FW	(Turkey)	Fatih Tekke	Beşiktaş	Undisclosed	

=== Loans out ===
Date from	Position	Nationality	Name	To	Date to	Ref.
Winter 2010	DF	(Georgia (country))	Davit Kvirkvelia	Anzhi Makhachkala	Summer 2011	
Winter 2010	FW	(Russia)	Vladimir Dyadyun	Spartak Nalchik	End of Season	
Winter 2010	FW	(Russia)	Roman Adamov	Rostov	Summer 2012	
Winter 2009	FW	(Russia)	Vladimir Dyadyun	Spartak Nalchik	End of Season	
14 July 2010	DF	(Russia)	Mikhail Mishchenko	Ventspils	End of Season	
5 August 2010	FW	(Uzbekistan)	Bahodir Nasimov	Neftchi Baku	May 2011	
11 August 2010	MF	(Russia)	Aleksei Kotlyarov	Khimki	End of Season	
11 August 2010	FW	(Uzbekistan)	Davron Mirzaev	Khimki	End of Season	
23 August 2010	GK	(Russia)	Yevgeni Cheremisin	Dynamo St.Petersburg	End of Season	
23 August 2010	MF	(Uzbekistan)	Vagiz Galiulin	Sibir Novosibirsk	End of Season	
24 August 2010	DF	(Spain)	Jordi	Real Valladolid	Summer 2011	

=== Released ===
Date	Position	Nationality	Name	Joined	Date
31 December 2010	GK	(Russia)	Yevgeni Cheremisin	Neftekhimik Nizhnekamsk	
31 December 2010	DF	(Russia)	Mikhail Badyautdinov	Ventspils	
31 December 2010	DF	(Russia)	Serdar Iolomanov		
31 December 2010	DF	(Russia)	Igor Klimov	Sibir Novosibirsk	
31 December 2010	DF	(Russia)	Dmitri Tarabrikov		
31 December 2010	MF	(Italy)	Valerio Brandi		
31 December 2010	MF	(Russia)	Vladimir Chernov	Gornyak Uchaly	
31 December 2010	MF	(South Africa)	MacBeth Sibaya	Moroka Swallows	11 February 2011
31 December 2010	FW	(Uzbekistan)	Davron Mirzaev	Neftekhimik Nizhnekamsk	

== Competitions ==
=== UEFA Europa League ===
==== Knockout phase ====
18 February 2010 Round of 32 1st leg	Rubin Kazan (Russia)	3 – 0	(Israel) Hapoel Tel Aviv	Kazan, Russia
17:00 MSK (UTC+3)	Bukharov 14', 23'; Semak 69'	Report	Yadin (yellow card) 29'; Bondar (yellow card) 37'; Shish (yellow card) 79' de Ridder (yellow card) 87'	Stadium: Central Stadium; Attendance: 7,152; Referee: William Collum (Scotland)

25 February 2010 Round of 32 2nd leg	Hapoel Tel Aviv (Israel)	0 – 0 (0 – 3 agg.)	(Russia) Rubin Kazan	Tel Aviv, Israel
23:05 MSK (UTC+3)	Kende (yellow card) 65'; Shish (yellow card) 66'	Report	Semak (yellow card) 48'; Balyaikin (yellow card) 59'; Navas (yellow card) 64'	Stadium: Bloomfield Stadium; Attendance: 12,864; Referee: Pavel Kralovec (Czech Republic)

11 March 2010 Round of 16 1st leg	Rubin Kazan (Russia)	1 – 1	(Germany) Wolfsburg	Kazan, Russia
21:00 MSK (UTC+3)	Noboa 29'	Report	Misimović 67'	Stadium: Central Stadium; Attendance: 16,700; Referee: Pedro Proença (Portugal)

18 March 2010 Round of 16 2nd leg	Wolfsburg (Germany)	2 – 1 (a.e.t.) (3 – 2 agg.)	(Russia) Rubin Kazan	Wolfsburg, Germany
23:05 MSK (UTC+3)	Martins 58'; Gentner (yellow card) 116' (goal) 119'	Report	Kasaev 21' (yellow card) 77'; Navas (yellow card) 25' (yellow-red card) 108'; Orekhov (yellow card) 57'; Gorbanets (yellow card) 90'	Stadium: Volkswagen Arena; Attendance: 15,412; Referee: Jonas Eriksson (Sweden)

=== Russian Super Cup ===
7 March 2010	Rubin Kazan	1 – 0	CSKA Moscow	Moscow
14:00 MSK (UTC+3)	Bukharov 35'; Kabze (yellow card) 56'; Ryzhikov (yellow card) 90'	Report	Šemberas (yellow card) 48'; Mamayev (yellow card) 65'; Honda (yellow card) 68'	Stadium: Luzhniki Stadium; Attendance: 17,000; Referee: Stanislav Sukhina

=== Russian Premier League ===
==== Results by round ====
Round	1	2	3	4	5	6	7	8	9	10	11	12	13	14	15	16	17	18	19	20	21	22	23	24	25	26	27	28	29	30
Ground	H	A	H	A	H	A	H	A	H	A	H	H	A	H	A	H	A	H	A	H	A	H	A	H	A	A	H	A	H	A
Result	W	W	D	D	D	W	D	D	W	W	L	W	W	W	L	W	D	W	D	W	W	W	D	W	D	W	D	D	D	D
Position	1	1	2	3	4	2	4	4	4	3	3	3	3	2	3	2	3	2	2	2	2	2	2	2	2	2	3	3	3	3

Updated to match(es) played on 28 November 2010. Source: See Results
A = Away; H = Home; W = Win; D = Draw; L = Loss

==== Results ====
14 March 2010 1	Rubin Kazan	2 – 0	Lokomotiv Moscow	Kazan
15:00 MSK (UTC+4)	Noboa (yellow card) 68'; Gorbanets 88'; Bukharov 90'	Report	Tarasov (yellow card) 27'; Dujmović (yellow card) 63'	Stadium: Central Stadium; Attendance: 8,123; Referee: Vladislav Bezborodov

22 March 2010 2	Tom Tomsk	0 – 1	Rubin Kazan	Tomsk
16:00 MSK (UTC+4)	Kim (yellow card) 4'; Ivanov (yellow card) 6'; Dzhioyev (yellow card) 29' (yellow-red card) 55'; Klimov (yellow card) 50' (yellow-red card) 75'; Jokić (yellow card) 90'; D.N.Smirnov (yellow card) 90'	Report	Tekke (yellow card) 4'; Gorbanets (yellow card) 8' (yellow-red card) 83'; Kasaev (yellow card) 11'; Ansaldi (yellow card) 42'; Bukharov 76'; Orekhov (yellow card) 90'; Ryzhikov (yellow card) 90'	Stadium: Trud Stadium; Attendance: 14,000; Referee: Nikolai Ivanov

28 March 2010 3	Rubin Kazan	0 – 0	Terek Grozny	Kazan
16:30 MSK (UTC+4)	Kasaev (yellow card) 65'; Jordi (yellow card) 81'	Report	Amelyanchuk (yellow card) 45'; Arce (yellow card) 50'; Utsiyev (yellow card) 79'; Sadayev (yellow card) 90'	Stadium: Central Stadium; Attendance: 10,072; Referee: Aleksei Nikolaev

4 April 2010 4	Saturn	0 – 0	Rubin Kazan	Ramenskoye
16:30 MSK (UTC+4)	Angbwa (yellow card) 26'; Evseev (yellow card) 65'	Report	Navas (yellow card) 73'	Stadium: Saturn Stadium; Attendance: 5,00; Referee: Alexei Kovalev

12 April 2010 5	Rubin Kazan	1 – 1	Spartak Nalchik	Kazan
18:30 MSK (UTC+4)	Noboa (yellow card) 20' (goal) 60'	Report	Geteriev (yellow card) 11'; Džudović (yellow card) 24'; Kisenkov (yellow card) 33'; Bikmaev (yellow card) 80'; Rusič 87'	Stadium: Central Stadium; Attendance: 10,230; Referee: Sergei Karasev

17 April 2010 6	Amkar Perm	0 – 1	Rubin Kazan	Perm
16:15 MSK (UTC+4)	Belorukov (yellow card) 76'; Topchu (yellow card) 82'; Pomerko (yellow card) 90'	Report	Kaleshin (yellow card) 12'; Natkho 20'; Bukharov (yellow card) 48'; Orekhov (yellow card) 59'	Stadium: Zvezda Stadium; Attendance: 12,000; Referee: Aleksandr Gvardis

25 April 2010 7	Rubin Kazan	0 – 0	Anzhi Makhachkala	Kazan
18:30 MSK (UTC+4)	Orekhov (yellow card) 71'	Report	Kébé (yellow card) 34'; Agalarov (yellow card) 55'; Revishvili (yellow card) 84'; Arziani (yellow card) 90'	Stadium: Central Stadium; Attendance: 8,120; Referee: Eduard Malyi

2 May 2010 8	Alania Vladikavkaz	1 – 1	Rubin Kazan	Vladikavkaz
16:15 MSK (UTC+4)	Stoyanov 32'; Kuznetsov (yellow card) 73'	Report	Jordi (yellow card) 26'; Navas (yellow card) 30'; Kasaev 88'; Orekhov (yellow card) 89'	Stadium: Republican Spartak Stadium; Attendance: 17,000; Referee: Maksim Layushkin

6 May 2010 9	Rubin Kazan	1 – 0	Sibir Novosibirsk	Kazan
14:15 MSK (UTC+4)	Noboa 51'	Report	Makarenko (yellow card) 32'; Bukhryakov (yellow card) 34'; Valentić (yellow card) 58'; Kowalewski (yellow card) 58'	Stadium: Central Stadium; Attendance: 5,200; Referee: Vyacheslav Kharlamov

10 May 2010 10	Rostov	0 – 2	Rubin Kazan	Rostov-on-Don
18:30 MSK (UTC+4)	Pavlenko (yellow card) 79'	Report	Bukharov (yellow card) 37' (goal) 76'; Semak 63'; Noboa (yellow card) 85'	Stadium: Olimp-2; Attendance: 12,500; Referee: Nikolai Ivanov

14 May 2010 11	Rubin Kazan	0 – 1	CSKA Moscow	Kazan
18:15 MSK (UTC+4)		Report	González 38'; Dzagoev (yellow card) 83'	Stadium: Central Stadium; Attendance: 17,100; Referee: Vladislav Bezborodov

9 July 2010 12	Rubin Kazan	3 – 0	Krylia Sovetov	Kazan
16:30 MSK (UTC+4)	Kasaev 33'; Balyaikin (yellow card) 54'; Bukharov 79'; Ryazantsev 90' (pen.)	Report	Budylin (yellow card) 57'; Petrović (yellow card) 76'	Stadium: Central Stadium; Attendance: 12,900; Referee: Aleksandr Kolobaev

17 July 2010 13	Spartak Moscow	0 – 1	Rubin Kazan	Moscow
21:00 MSK (UTC+4)	Sheshukov (yellow card) 54'; Suchý (yellow card) 84'; Kudryashov (yellow card) 86' (yellow-red card) 90'	Report	Noboa 3' (yellow card) 30'; Karadeniz (yellow card) 23'; Navas (yellow card) 53'	Stadium: Luzhniki Stadium; Attendance: 16,000; Referee: Stanislav Sukhina

24 July 2010 14	Rubin Kazan	2 – 0	Dynamo Moscow	Kazan
21:00 MSK (UTC+4)	Ansaldi (yellow card) 32'; Kasaev 55', 63'	Report	Wilkshire (yellow card) 16'; Semshov (yellow card) 57'; Kolodin (yellow card) 70'; Khokhlov (yellow card) 90'; Granat (yellow card) 90'	Stadium: Central Stadium; Attendance: 15,100; Referee: Igor Egorov

31 July 2010 15	Zenit St.Petersburg	2 – 0	Rubin Kazan	Saint Petersburg
16:00 MSK (UTC+4)	Denisov (yellow card) 36'; Kerzhakov 45', 65'; Anyukov (yellow card) 52'	Report	Karadeniz (yellow card) 48'	Stadium: Petrovsky Stadium; Attendance: 21,500; Referee: Sergei Karasev

8 August 2010 16	Rubin Kazan	2 – 1	Tom Tomsk	Kazan
20:30 MSK (UTC+4)	Ryazantsev 36'; Orekhov 64'	Report	Dzyuba 37'	Stadium: Central Stadium; Attendance: 13,975; Referee: Almir Kayumov

15 August 2010 17	Terek Grozny	1 – 1	Rubin Kazan	Grozny
20:45 MSK (UTC+4)	Bracamonte 30'; Kobenko (yellow card) 81'	Report	Navas (yellow card) 19'; Noboa 52' (pen.); Murawski (yellow card) 55' (yellow-red card) 88'; Kaleshin (yellow card) 79'; Balyaikin (yellow card) 84'; Kasaev (yellow card) 90'	Stadium: Sultan Bilimkhanov Stadium; Attendance: 7,500; Referee: Aleksandr Kolobaev

22 August 2010 18	Rubin Kazan	2 – 0	Saturn	Kazan
18:30 MSK (UTC+4)	Orekhov (yellow card) 30'; Noboa 33' (pen.); Medvedev 69'	Report	Karyaka (yellow card) 30' (yellow-red card) 53'; Angbwa (yellow card) 32'; Sapeta (yellow card) 37'; Parfenov (yellow card) 74'	Stadium: Central Stadium; Attendance: 15,400; Referee: Evgeny Turbin

28 August 2010 19	Spartak Nalchik	1 – 1	Rubin Kazan	Spartak Stadium
20:45 MSK (UTC+4)	Jovanović (yellow card) 19' (goal) 28'; Leandro (yellow card) 45'; Golić (yellow card) 89'	Report	Kasaev 15'; Orekhov (yellow card) 49'; Sibaya (yellow card) 63'; Kuzmin (yellow card) 89'	Stadium: Nalchik; Attendance: 11,000; Referee: Maksim Layushkin

11 September 2010 20	Rubin Kazan	3 – 0	Amkar Perm	Kazan
19:45 MSK (UTC+4)	Carlos Eduardo 27', 52' (yellow card) 53'; Martins 86' (pen.)	Report	Volkov (yellow card) 23'; Narubin (yellow card) 86'	Stadium: Central Stadium; Attendance: 13,400; Referee: Vladimir Pettay

19 September 2010 21	Anzhi Makhachkala	0 – 1	Rubin Kazan	Makhachkala
16:15 MSK (UTC+4)		Report	Karadeniz 90'	Stadium: Dynamo Stadium; Attendance: 12,000; Referee: Sergei Karasev

25 September 2010 22	Rubin Kazan	1 – 0	Alania Vladikavkaz	Kazan
18:00 MSK (UTC+4)	Bocchetti 38'	Report	Florescu (yellow card) 44'; Goore (yellow card) 52'; Bikmaev (yellow card) 62'; Gnanou (yellow card) 63'	Stadium: Central Stadium; Attendance: 14,360; Referee: Aleksei Nikolaev

3 October 2010 23	Sibir Novosibirsk	2 – 2	Rubin Kazan	Novosibirsk
11:45 MSK (UTC+4)	Nagibin (yellow card) 27'; Joseph-Reinette 29'; Oyewole (yellow card) 50'; Belyayev 83' (yellow card) 83'	Report	Eduardo (yellow card) 45'; Noboa 50' (pen.); Bocchetti (yellow card) 58' (goal) 80'; Kornilenko (yellow card) 62'; Kuzmin (yellow card) 73'; Kaleshin (yellow card) 82' (yellow-red card) 90'	Stadium: Spartak Stadium; Attendance: 8,000; Referee: Nikolai Ivanov

16 October 2010 24	Rubin Kazan	2 – 1	Rostov	Kazan
18:30 MSK (UTC+4)	Natkho 10'; Martins 12'; Navas (yellow card) 21'; Medvedev (yellow card) 50'; Balyaikin (yellow card) 84' (yellow-red card) 86'; Ryzhikov (yellow card) 90'	Report	Pavlenko 3'; Cherkes (yellow card) 44'; Okoronkwo (yellow card) 66'; Gațcan (yellow card) 71'	Stadium: Central Stadium; Attendance: 11,480; Referee: Maksim Layushkin

24 October 2010 25	CSKA Moscow	0 – 0	Rubin Kazan	Moscow
14:10 MSK (UTC+4)	Nababkin (yellow card) 45'	Report	Navas (yellow card) 62'; Kuzmin (yellow card) 69'	Stadium: Arena Khimki; Attendance: 11,000; Referee: Stanislav Sukhina

29 October 2010 26	Krylia Sovetov	0 – 2	Rubin Kazan	Samara
19:45 MSK (UTC+4)		Report	Kornilenko 46', 59'	Stadium: Metallurg Stadium; Attendance: 14,450; Referee: Eduard Malyi

8 November 2010 27	Rubin Kazan	1 – 1	Spartak Moscow	Kazan
20:00 MSK (UTC+4)	Kaleshin (yellow card) 54'; Kornilenko (yellow card) 75' (goal) 90+4'	Report	Welliton 41'; Sheshukov (yellow card) 45'	Stadium: Central Stadium; Attendance: 20,450; Referee: Vladislav Bezborodov

13 November 2010 28	Dynamo Moscow	2 – 2	Rubin Kazan	Moscow
20:00 MSK (UTC+4)	Epureanu 24'; Kurányi 36'; Semshov (yellow card) 37'; Ropotan (yellow card) 80'; Wilkshire (yellow card) 86'; Česnauskis (yellow card) 88'; Voronin (yellow card) 90'	Report	Noboa 49', 65'; Kuzmin (yellow card) 70'; Navas (yellow card) 90'	Stadium: Arena Khimki; Attendance: 7,322; Referee: Igor Egorov

20 November 2010 29	Rubin Kazan	2 – 2	Zenit St.Petersburg	Kazan
15:00 MSK (UTC+4)	Sharonov (yellow card) 10'; Kuzmin (yellow card) 51'; Navas 59'; Medvedev 67'	Report	Lazović (yellow card) 6'; Fayzulin 19'; Huszti 55'; Luković (yellow card) 65'; Kerzhakov (yellow card) 74'; Rosina (yellow card) 82'; Shirokov (yellow card) 90'	Stadium: Central Stadium; Attendance: 18,400; Referee: Aleksandr Kolobaev

28 November 2010 30	Lokomotiv Moscow	0 – 0	Rubin Kazan	Moscow
15:00 MSK (UTC+4)	Ďurica (yellow card) 30'; Tarasov (red card) 77'	Report	Kuzmin (yellow card) 41'; Sibaya (yellow card) 42'; Balyaikin (yellow card) 45'; Navas (yellow card) 74'; Sharonov (yellow card) 82'	Stadium: Lokomotiv Stadium; Attendance: 14,046; Referee: Vyacheslav Popov

==== League table ====
Pos	Team	Pld	W	D	L	GF	GA	GD	Pts	Qualification or relegation
1	Zenit St. Petersburg (C)	30	20	8	2	61	21	+40	68	Qualification to Champions League group stage
2	CSKA Moscow	30	18	8	4	51	22	+29	62	Qualification to Champions League group stage
3	Rubin Kazan	30	15	13	2	37	16	+21	58	Qualification to Champions League third qualifying round
4	Spartak Moscow	30	13	10	7	43	33	+10	49	Qualification to Europa League play-off round
5	Lokomotiv Moscow	30	13	9	8	34	29	+5	48	Qualification to Europa League play-off round

Source: RFPL (in Russian)
Rules for classification: 1st points; 2nd matches won; 3rd head-to-head (points, matches won, goal difference, goals scored, away goals scored); 4th goal difference; 5th goals scored; 6th away goals scored; 7th position in previous season or decision game
(C) Champions

=== Russian Cup ===
13 July 2010 Round of 32	Volgar-Gazprom Astrakhan	1 – 0	Rubin Kazan	Astrakhan
19:00 MSK (UTC+4)	Sicaci (yellow card) 32'; Marushchak 45'	Report		Stadium: Central Stadium; Attendance: 10,500; Referee: Aleksandr Gonchar

=== UEFA Champions League ===
==== Group stage ====
Pos	Team	Pld	W	D	L	GF	GA	GD	Pts	Qualification
1	(Spain) Barcelona	6	4	2	0	14	3	+11	14	Advance to knockout phase
2	(Denmark) Copenhagen	6	3	1	2	7	5	+2	10	Advance to knockout phase
3	(Russia) Rubin Kazan	6	1	3	2	2	4	−2	6	Transfer to Europa League
4	(Greece) Panathinaikos	6	0	2	4	2	13	−11	2	

Source: Soccerway

14 September 2010 1	Copenhagen (Denmark)	1 – 0	(Russia) Rubin Kazan	Copenhagen, Denmark
22:45 MSK (UTC+4)	N'Doye 87'	Report	Orekhov (yellow card) 61'; Kaleshin (yellow card) 84'	Stadium: Parken Stadium; Attendance: 29,561; Referee: Thomas Einwaller (Austria)

29 September 2010 2	Rubin Kazan (Russia)	1 – 1	(Spain) Barcelona	Kazan, Russia
20:30 MSK (UTC+4)	Noboa 30' (pen.); Salukvadze (yellow card) 40'; Ansaldi (yellow card) 74'; Sibaya (yellow card) 80'	Report	Puyol (yellow card) 52'; Villa 60' (pen.); Piqué (yellow card) 90+1'	Stadium: Central Stadium; Attendance: 23,950; Referee: Cüneyt Çakır (Turkey)

20 October 2010 3	Panathinaikos (Greece)	0 – 0	(Russia) Rubin Kazan	Athens, Greece
22:45 MSK (UTC+4)	Simão (yellow card) 90+1'	Report	Karadeniz (yellow card) 7'; Noboa (yellow card) 78'	Stadium: Olympic Stadium; Attendance: 36,748; Referee: Manuel Gräfe (Germany)

2 November 2010 4	Rubin Kazan (Russia)	0 – 0	(Greece) Panathinaikos	Kazan, Russia
21:30 MSK (UTC+4)		Report	Vyntra (yellow card) 71'; Karagounis (yellow card) 76'; Marinos (yellow card) 85'	Stadium: Central Stadium; Attendance: 16,400; Referee: Tony Chapron (France)

24 November 2010 5	Rubin Kazan (Russia)	1 – 0	(Denmark) Copenhagen	Kazan, Russia
21"30 MSK (UTC+4)	Ryazantsev (yellow card) 42'; Noboa 45+2' (pen.); Kaleshin (yellow card) 79'	Report	Bolaños (yellow card) 10'; Wendt (yellow card) 72'	Stadium: Central Stadium; Attendance: 18,720; Referee: Martin Atkinson (England)

7 December 2010 6	Barcelona (Spain)	2 – 0	(Russia) Rubin Kazan	Barcelona, Spain
23:45 MSK (UTC+4)	Fontàs 51'; Vázquez 83'	Report	Ryzhikov (yellow card) 24'	Stadium: Camp Nou; Attendance: 50,436; Referee: Jonas Eriksson (Sweden)

== Squad statistics ==
As of match played 7 December 2010

=== Appearances and goals ===
No.	Pos	Nat	Player	Total		Premier League		Russian Cup		Super Cup		Europa League		Champions League	
No.	Pos	Nat	Player	Apps	Goals	Apps	Goals	Apps	Goals	Apps	Goals	Apps	Goals	Apps	Goals
2	DF	(Russia) RUS	Oleg Kuzmin	15	0	12+1	0	0	0	0	0	0	0	1+1	0
3	DF	(Argentina) ARG	Cristian Ansaldi	31	0	19+1	0	0	0	1	0	4	0	6	0
4	DF	(Spain) ESP	César Navas	39	1	29	1	0	0	1	0	4	0	5	0
5	MF	(Russia) RUS	Pyotr Bystrov	12	0	7+1	0	1	0	0	0	0	0	0+3	0
6	MF	(South Africa) RSA	MacBeth Sibaya	12	0	5+2	0	0	0	1	0	1+1	0	0+2	0
8	MF	(Russia) RUS	Aleksandr Ryazantsev	20	2	9+4	2	1	0	0	0	1	0	5	0
9	DF	(Georgia (country)) GEO	Lasha Salukvadze	18	0	9+1	0	0	0	1	0	3+1	0	2+1	0
14	MF	(Russia) RUS	Alan Kasaev	38	6	27+1	5	0	0	1	0	3+1	1	3+2	0
15	MF	(Poland) POL	Rafał Murawski	30	1	20+3	1	0	0	0	0	3+1	0	3	0
16	MF	(Ecuador) ECU	Christian Noboa	38	11	26+1	8	0	0	1	0	4	1	6	2
19	DF	(Russia) RUS	Vitali Kaleshin	23	0	14+1	0	0	0	0	0	2	0	6	0
21	FW	(Moldova) MDA	Alexandru Antoniuc	1	0	0+1	0	0	0	0	0	0	0	0	0
22	DF	(Russia) RUS	Aleksandr Orekhov	23	1	19	1	0	0	1	0	2	0	1	0
23	MF	(Russia) RUS	Yevgeni Balyaikin	16	0	4+9	0	0	0	0	0	1+2	0	0	0
26	FW	(Russia) RUS	Aleksei Medvedev	16	2	6+7	2	0	0	0	0	0	0	0+3	0
27	DF	(Italy) ITA	Salvatore Bocchetti	13	2	6+1	2	0	0	0	0	0	0	6	0
28	FW	(Nigeria) NGR	Obafemi Martins	17	2	9+3	2	0	0	0	0	0	0	2+3	0
32	MF	(Russia) RUS	Andrei Gorbanets	20	1	7+10	1	0	0	0+1	0	0+2	0	0	0
44	GK	(Lithuania) LTU	Giedrius Arlauskis	2	0	2	0	0	0	0	0	0	0	0	0
56	MF	(Russia) RUS	Ruslan Makhmutov	1	0	0	0	1	0	0	0	0	0	0	0
61	MF	(Turkey) TUR	Gökdeniz Karadeniz	27	1	11+6	1	0	0	0	0	4	0	4+2	0
65	DF	(Russia) RUS	Maksim Zhestokov	1	0	0	0	1	0	0	0	0	0	0	0
66	MF	(Israel) ISR	Bibras Natkho	18	2	10+4	2	0	0	0	0	0	0	3+1	0
76	DF	(Russia) RUS	Roman Sharonov	2	0	2	0	0	0	0	0	0	0	0	0
77	GK	(Russia) RUS	Sergey Ryzhikov	39	0	28	0	0	0	1	0	4	0	6	0
81	FW	(Russia) RUS	Ildar Bikchantayev	1	0	0	0	0+1	0	0	0	0	0	0	0
83	MF	(Russia) RUS	Vladimir Chernov	1	0	0	0	1	0	0	0	0	0	0	0
87	MF	(Brazil) BRA	Carlos Eduardo	8	2	6	2	0	0	0	0	0	0	2	0
88	FW	(Belarus) BLR	Sergei Kornilenko	13	3	5+3	3	0	0	0	0	0	0	5	0
97	FW	(Russia) RUS	Igor Portnyagin	5	0	0+4	0	0	0	0	0	0+1	0	0	0
Players away from the club on loan:
20	FW	(Uzbekistan) UZB	Bahodir Nasimov	3	0	1+1	0	1	0	0	0	0	0	0	0
30	GK	(Russia) RUS	Yevgeni Cheremisin	1	0	0	0	1	0	0	0	0	0	0	0
33	DF	(Spain) ESP	Jordi	9	0	7+1	0	1	0	0	0	0	0	0	0
49	MF	(Uzbekistan) UZB	Vagiz Galiulin	9	0	7	0	1	0	1	0	0	0	0	0
67	FW	(Uzbekistan) UZB	Davron Mirzaev	1	0	0	0	0+1	0	0	0	0	0	0	0
Players who left Rubin Kazan during the season:
7	MF	(Russia) RUS	Sergei Semak	10	1	8	0	0	0	0	0	2	1	0	0
10	FW	(Turkey) TUR	Fatih Tekke	7	0	2+3	0	1	0	0+1	0	0	0	0	0
11	FW	(Russia) RUS	Aleksandr Bukharov	17	7	11+1	4	0	0	1	1	4	2	0	0
68	FW	(Russia) RUS	Ilya Kukharchuk	1	0	0	0	0+1	0	0	0	0	0	0	0
99	FW	(Turkey) TUR	Hasan Kabze	9	0	2+3	0	0	0	1	0	2+1	0	0	0

=== Goal scorers ===
Place	Position	Nation	Number	Name	Premier League	Russian Cup	Super Cup	Europa League	Champions League	Total
1	MF	(Ecuador)	16	Christian Noboa	8	0	0	1	2	11
2	FW	(Russia)	11	Aleksandr Bukharov	4	0	1	2	0	7
3	MF	(Russia)	14	Alan Kasaev	5	0	0	1	0	6
4	FW	(Belarus)	88	Sergei Kornilenko	3	0	0	0	0	3
5	DF	(Italy)	27	Salvatore Bocchetti	2	0	0	0	0	2
5	MF	(Russia)	8	Aleksandr Ryazantsev	2	0	0	0	0	2
5	MF	(Israel)	66	Bibras Natkho	2	0	0	0	0	2
5	MF	(Brazil)	87	Carlos Eduardo	2	0	0	0	0	2
5	FW	(Russia)	26	Aleksei Medvedev	2	0	0	0	0	2
5	FW	(Nigeria)	28	Obafemi Martins	2	0	0	0	0	2
5	MF	(Russia)	7	Sergei Semak	1	0	0	1	0	2
12	DF	(Spain)	4	César Navas	1	0	0	0	0	1
12	DF	(Russia)	22	Aleksandr Orekhov	1	0	0	0	0	1
12	MF	(Russia)	32	Andrei Gorbanets	1	0	0	0	0	1
12	MF	(Turkey)	61	Gökdeniz Karadeniz	1	0	0	0	0	1
				Totals	37	0	1	5	2	45

=== Disciplinary record ===
Number	Nation	Position	Name	Premier League		Russian Cup		Super Cup		Europa League		Champions League		Total	
Number	Nation	Position	Name	Yellow card	Red card	Yellow card	Red card	Yellow card	Red card	Yellow card	Red card	Yellow card	Red card	Yellow card	Red card
2	(Russia)	DF	Oleg Kuzmin	6	0	0	0	0	0	0	0	6	0		
3	(Argentina)	DF	Cristian Ansaldi	2	0	0	0	0	0	0	0	1	0	3	0
4	(Spain)	DF	César Navas	8	0	0	0	0	0	3	1	0	0	11	1
6	(South Africa)	MF	MacBeth Sibaya	2	0	0	0	0	0	0	0	1	0	3	0
8	(Russia)	MF	Aleksandr Ryazantsev	0	0	0	0	0	0	0	0	1	0	1	0
9	(Georgia (country))	DF	Lasha Salukvadze	0	0	0	0	0	0	0	0	1	0	1	0
14	(Russia)	MF	Alan Kasaev	3	0	0	0	0	0	1	0	0	0	4	0
15	(Poland)	MF	Rafał Murawski	2	1	0	0	0	0	0	0	0	0	2	1
16	(Ecuador)	MF	Christian Noboa	4	0	0	0	0	0	0	0	1	0	5	0
19	(Russia)	DF	Vitali Kaleshin	5	1	0	0	0	0	0	0	2	0	7	1
22	(Russia)	DF	Aleksandr Orekhov	6	0	0	0	0	0	1	0	1	0	8	0
23	(Russia)	MF	Yevgeni Balyaikin	5	1	0	0	0	0	1	0	0	0	6	1
26	(Russia)	FW	Aleksei Medvedev	1	0	0	0	0	0	0	0	0	0	1	0
27	(Italy)	DF	Salvatore Bocchetti	1	0	0	0	0	0	0	0	0	0	1	0
32	(Russia)	MF	Andrei Gorbanets	2	1	0	0	0	0	1	0	0	0	3	1
61	(Turkey)	MF	Gökdeniz Karadeniz	2	0	0	0	0	0	0	0	1	0	3	0
76	(Russia)	DF	Roman Sharonov	2	0	0	0	0	0	0	0	0	0	2	0
77	(Russia)	GK	Sergey Ryzhikov	2	0	0	0	1	0	0	0	1	0	4	0
87	(Brazil)	MF	Carlos Eduardo	2	0	0	0	0	0	0	0	0	0	2	0
88	(Belarus)	FW	Sergei Kornilenko	2	0	0	0	0	0	0	0	0	0	2	0
Players away on loan:
33	(Spain)	DF	Jordi	2	0	0	0	0	0	0	0	0	0	2	0
Players who left Rubin Kazan during the season:
7	(Russia)	MF	Sergei Semak	0	0	0	0	0	0	1	0	0	0	1	0
10	(Turkey)	FW	Fatih Tekke	1	0	0	0	0	0	0	0	0	0	1	0
11	(Russia)	FW	Aleksandr Bukharov	2	0	0	0	0	0	0	0	0	0	2	0
99	(Turkey)	FW	Hasan Kabze	0	0	0	0	1	0	0	0	0	0	1	0
			Totals	62	4	0	0	2	0	8	1	10	0	82	5
