= 2010 Russian Super Cup =

Football match

The Company TTK — 2010 Russian Football Super Cup (Russian: Компания ТТК — Суперкубок России по футболу) was the 8th Russian Super Cup match, a football match which was contested between the 2009 Russian Premier League champion, Rubin Kazan, and the winner of 2008–09 Russian Cup, CSKA Moscow. The match was held on 7 March 2010 at the Luzhniki Stadium in Moscow, Russia. Rubin Kazan beat CSKA Moscow 1–0, to win their first Russian Super Cup.

== Match details ==
7 March 2010
14:00 MSK

Rubin Kazan	1–0	CSKA Moscow
Bukharov 35'	Report

Luzhniki, Moscow
Attendance: 17,000
Referee: Stanislav Sukhina (Malakhovka)

Rubin	CSKA

GK	77	(Russia) Sergei Ryzhikov	(yellow card) 90'
DF	3	(Argentina) Cristian Ansaldi
DF	4	(Spain) César Navas
DF	9	(Georgia (country)) Lasha Salukvadze
DF	22	(Russia) Aleksandr Orekhov
MF	6	(South Africa) MacBeth Sibaya (c)
MF	14	(Russia) Alan Kasaev
MF	16	(Ecuador) Christian Noboa
MF	49	(Uzbekistan) Vagiz Galiulin	(substituted off) 71'
FW	11	(Russia) Aleksandr Bukharov	(substituted off) 81'
FW	99	(Turkey) Hasan Kabze	(yellow card) 56'
Substitutes:
GK	30	(Russia) Yevgeni Cheremisin
DF	33	(Spain) Jordi Figueras Montel
MF	32	(Russia) Andrei Gorbanets	(substituted in) 71'
MF	15	(Poland) Rafał Murawski
MF	61	(Turkey) Gökdeniz Karadeniz
FW	10	(Turkey) Fatih Tekke	(substituted in) 81'
FW	97	(Russia) Igor Portnyagin
Manager:
(Turkmenistan) Kurban Berdyev Assistant referees: Vyacheslav Kharlamov (Tyumen); Igor Lapidus (Elista); Fourth official: Aleksandr Kolobaev (Moscow)

GK	35	(Russia) Igor Akinfeev (c)
DF	2	(Lithuania) Deividas Šemberas	(yellow card) 48'
DF	4	(Russia) Sergei Ignashevich
DF	6	(Russia) Aleksei Berezutskiy
DF	24	(Russia) Vasili Berezutskiy
DF	42	(Russia) Georgi Shchennikov
MF	7	(Japan) Keisuke Honda	(yellow card) 68'
MF	11	(Russia) Pavel Mamaev	(yellow card) 65'	(substituted off) 67'
MF	17	(Serbia) Miloš Krasić
MF	13	(Chile) Mark González
FW	89	(Czech Republic) Tomáš Necid
Substitutes:
GK	1	(Russia) Sergey Chepchugov
DF	14	(Russia) Kirill Nababkin
DF	15	(Nigeria) Chidi Odiah
MF	10	(Russia) Alan Dzagoev	(substituted in) 67'
MF	25	(Bosnia and Herzegovina) Elvir Rahimić
FW	20	(Brazil) Guilherme
FW	26	(Liberia) Sekou Oliseh
Manager:
(Russia) Leonid Slutsky

== See also ==
- 2010 in Russian football
- 2009 Russian Premier League
- 2008–09 Russian Cup
