= Ryzhikov =

Ryzhikov or Ryzhykov (Russian: Рыжиков; Ukrainian: Рижиков) is a Russian masculine surname, its feminine counterpart is Ryzhikova or Ryzhykova. The surname may refer to:

- Andrei Ryzhikov (born 1988), Russian footballer
- Anna Ryzhykova (born 1989), Ukrainian hurdler
- Sergey Ryzhikov (disambiguation), multiple people
