= Almaz Askarov =

Almaz Askarov may refer to:

- Almaz Askarov (footballer) (born 1992), Russian footballer
- Almaz Askarov (wrestler) (born 1973), Kyrgyzstani wrestler
