= 2012 Russian Super Cup =

- Event: 2012 Russian Super Cup
Zenit Saint Petersburg	Rubin Kazan
0	2
- Date: 14 July 2012
- Venue: Metallurg Stadium, Samara
- Referee: Sergei Karasyov (Moscow)
- Attendance: 16,284

The 2012 Russian Football Super Cup (Russian: Суперкубок России по футболу) was the 10th Russian Super Cup match, a football match which was contested between the 2011–12 Russian Premier League champion, Zenit Saint Petersburg, and the 2011–12 Russian Cup champion, Rubin Kazan.

The match was held on 14 July 2012 at the Metallurg Stadium, in Samara, Russia.

== Match details ==
14 July 2012
16:00 MSK (UTC+3)

Zenit Saint Petersburg	0–2	Rubin Kazan
	Report	Bocchetti 28'; Dyadyun 38'

Metallurg, Samara
Attendance: 16,284
Referee: Sergei Karasyov (Moscow)

Zenit	Rubin

GK	16	(Russia) Vyacheslav Malafeev (c)
DF	3	(Portugal) Bruno Alves	(substituted off) 65'
DF	4	(Italy) Domenico Criscito	(yellow card) 68'
DF	6	(Belgium) Nicolas Lombaerts
DF	14	(Slovakia) Tomáš Hubočan
MF	15	(Russia) Roman Shirokov
MF	20	(Russia) Viktor Fayzulin
MF	25	(Russia) Sergei Semak	(substituted off) 46'
MF	27	(Russia) Igor Denisov	(yellow card) 31'
MF	34	(Russia) Vladimir Bystrov	(yellow card) 62'	(substituted off) 71'
FW	11	(Russia) Aleksandr Kerzhakov
Substitutes:
GK	30	(Belarus) Yuri Zhevnov
DF	24	(Serbia) Aleksandar Luković	(substituted on) 65'
DF	58	(Russia) Ilya Zuyev
MF	18	(Russia) Konstantin Zyryanov	(substituted on) 71'
MF	94	(Russia) Aleksei Yevseyev
FW	9	(Russia) Aleksandr Bukharov	(substituted on) 46'
FW	99	(Russia) Maksim Kanunnikov
Manager:
(Italy) Luciano Spalletti Assistant referees: Vitali Drozdov (Moscow); Oleg Tselovalnikov (Astrakhan); Fourth official: Maksim Layushkin (Moscow)

GK	1	(Russia) Sergey Ryzhikov
DF	2	(Russia) Oleg Kuzmin
DF	3	(Argentina) Cristian Ansaldi	(yellow card) 40'
DF	4	(Spain) César Navas
DF	27	(Italy) Salvatore Bocchetti	(yellow card) 75'
DF	76	(Russia) Roman Sharonov (c)
MF	8	(Russia) Aleksandr Ryazantsev
MF	23	(Finland) Roman Eremenko
MF	61	(Turkey) Gökdeniz Karadeniz	(substituted off) 78'
FW	5	(Nigeria) Obafemi Martins	(yellow card) 34'	(substituted off) 64'
FW	22	(Russia) Vladimir Dyadyun	(substituted off) 74'
Substitutes:
GK	24	(Lithuania) Giedrius Arlauskis
DF	19	(Russia) Vitali Kaleshin	(substituted on) 74'
DF	25	(Spain) Iván Marcano	(substituted on) 78'
MF	10	(Russia) Alan Kasaev
MF	16	(Moldova) Mikhail Platica
MF	20	(Finland) Alexei Eremenko
FW	18	(Paraguay) Nelson Haedo Valdez	(substituted on) 64'
Manager:
(Russia) Kurban Berdyev

== See also ==
- 2012–13 Russian Premier League
- 2012–13 Russian Cup
