= Sergey Ryzhikov =

Sergey Ryzhikov may refer to:

- Sergey Ryzhikov (cosmonaut) (born 1974), Russian cosmonaut
- Sergey Ryzhikov (footballer) (born 1980), Russian football player
