= Christian Noboa =

Ecuadorian footballer (born 1985)

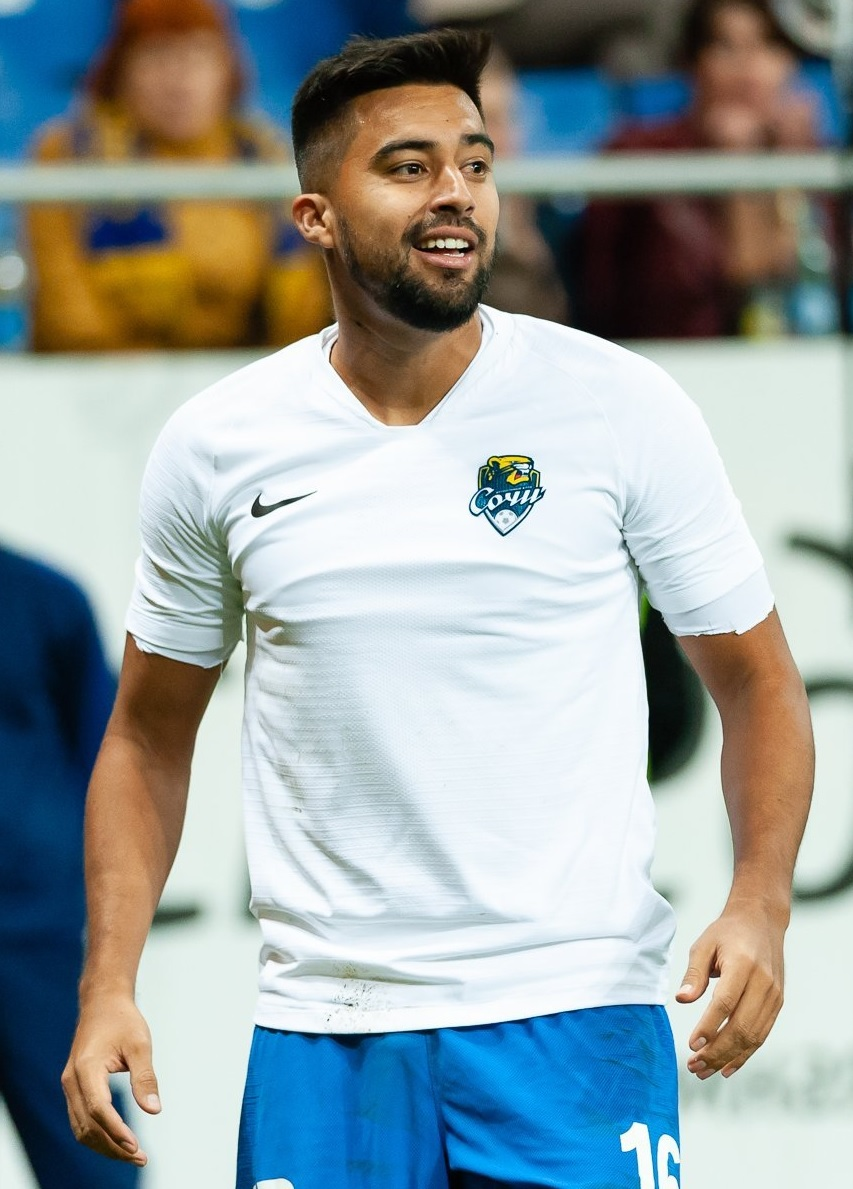
- Noboa with Sochi in 2019

Personal information
- Full name: Christian Fernando Noboa Tello
- Date of birth: 9 April 1985 (age 41)
- Place of birth: Guayaquil, Ecuador
- Height: 1.83 m (6 ft 0 in)
- Position: Midfielder

Youth career
- 1996–2001: El Nacional
- 2001–2004: Emelec

Senior career*
Years	Team	Apps	(Gls)
2004–2007	Emelec	89	(8)
2007–2012	Rubin Kazan	109	(22)
2012–2015	Dynamo Moscow	78	(12)
2015	PAOK	14	(2)
2015–2017	Rostov	50	(6)
2017–2019	Zenit Saint Petersburg	13	(0)
2018	→ Rubin Kazan (loan)	10	(2)
2019–2023	Sochi	106	(36)
2024	Emelec	0	(0)

International career
2009–2021	Ecuador	83	(4)
- * Club domestic league appearances and goals

Christian Fernando Noboa Tello (Spanish pronunciation: [ˈkɾistjan noˈβoa]; born 9 April 1985) is an Ecuadorian former footballer who played as a central midfielder.

== Club career ==
=== Emelec ===
Christian started out at Emelec.

=== Rubin Kazan ===
==== 2007–2012 ====
Christian was transferred in 2007 to FC Rubin Kazan of the Russian Premier League. In 2008, he helped Rubin win its first title of the RPL in history. In 2009, he played in the UEFA Champions League. On 29 September 2010, as a captain, Noboa helped Rubin Kazan obtain a draw against FC Barcelona in a Champions League match by scoring his side's only goal from a penalty kick.

=== Dynamo Moscow ===
==== 2012 ====
On 26 January 2012 Noboa signed with Dynamo Moscow for £8 million. His first match for Dynamo was on 5 March, in a 0–1 home loss to Anzhi Makhachkala. He played in 10 league matches for Dynamo in the 2012 season.

==== 2012–13 ====
His first match of the season was on 21 July, in 0–1 away loss to Volga Nizhny Novgorod. His first goal for club and season was on 25 August, in a 3–2 away win against Lokomotiv Moscow, which he later celebrated with tears after not having scored for a while. His next goal came in a 1–2 home loss to Kuban Krasnodar. His third goal of the first half of the season came in a 5–1 away win against league leaders CSKA Moscow. On 5 April Noboa scored a free-kick goal, in a 1–1 away draw against FK Amkar Perm'. On 21 April, Noboa scored the first goal in a 3–3 away draw against Anzhi.

==== 2013–14 ====
On 3 August he scored the winning goal against Terek Grozny (1–0).

==== 2014–15 ====
It was confirmed on 29 December 2014 that Noboa would not renegotiate terms with his club and is open to offers. On 31 December, the official site of FC Dynamo Moscow issued statement thanking Noboa for his services and wishing him good luck.

=== P.A.O.K. ===
On 7 January 2015, it was confirmed that Noboa would be joining PAOK FC on a 2.5 year contract. In an interview given to a radio station in Ecuador, Noboa revealed that his buy-out clause at PAOK is in the region of €1.5 million. Even though there is not any formal interest yet, Noboa hinted that he could be tempted to move away from PAOK if a Mexican club makes an approach.“I like the prospect of playing in Mexico. I hope that something concrete may come up. I would be open to play in a club there,” Noboa has reportedly said. On 8 January, he made his debut with the club in a 1–0 home win against Platanias, and scored his first goal on 21 February in a 3–1 away win against Veria.

He was in contention for the first two games in the Super League play-offs as he is set to travel to Ecuador late in May in order to start preparations for the Copa America. The Ecuadorian midfielder revealed that he will fly to his homeland on 27 May in order to be in contention with his National Team ahead of the tournament in Latin America which goes underway two weeks later.

=== Rostov ===
On 29 July 2015, Noboa signed a two-year contract with Russian Premier League side FC Rostov. He scored a goal on his Rostov debut in a 1–0 win over FC Amkar Perm on 28 August 2015.

=== Zenit ===
On 4 June 2017, Noboa signed a three-year deal with FC Zenit Saint Petersburg.

=== Return to Rubin Kazan ===
On 18 February 2018, Noboa returned to Rubin on loan from Zenit until the end of the 2017–18 season.

=== Sochi ===
On 5 August 2019, he signed a 2-year contract with Russian Premier League newcomers PFC Sochi, joining several other former Zenit players on the squad. As of 25 August 2020, Noboa scored nine goals for FC Sochi, including a late goal against FC Tambov on the matchday 5. On 19 January 2023, Noboa extended his contract with Sochi for the 2023–24 season, with an option for 2024–25 season.

=== Return to Emelec ===
On 24 January 2024, Sochi announced Noboa's return to Emelec.

== International career ==
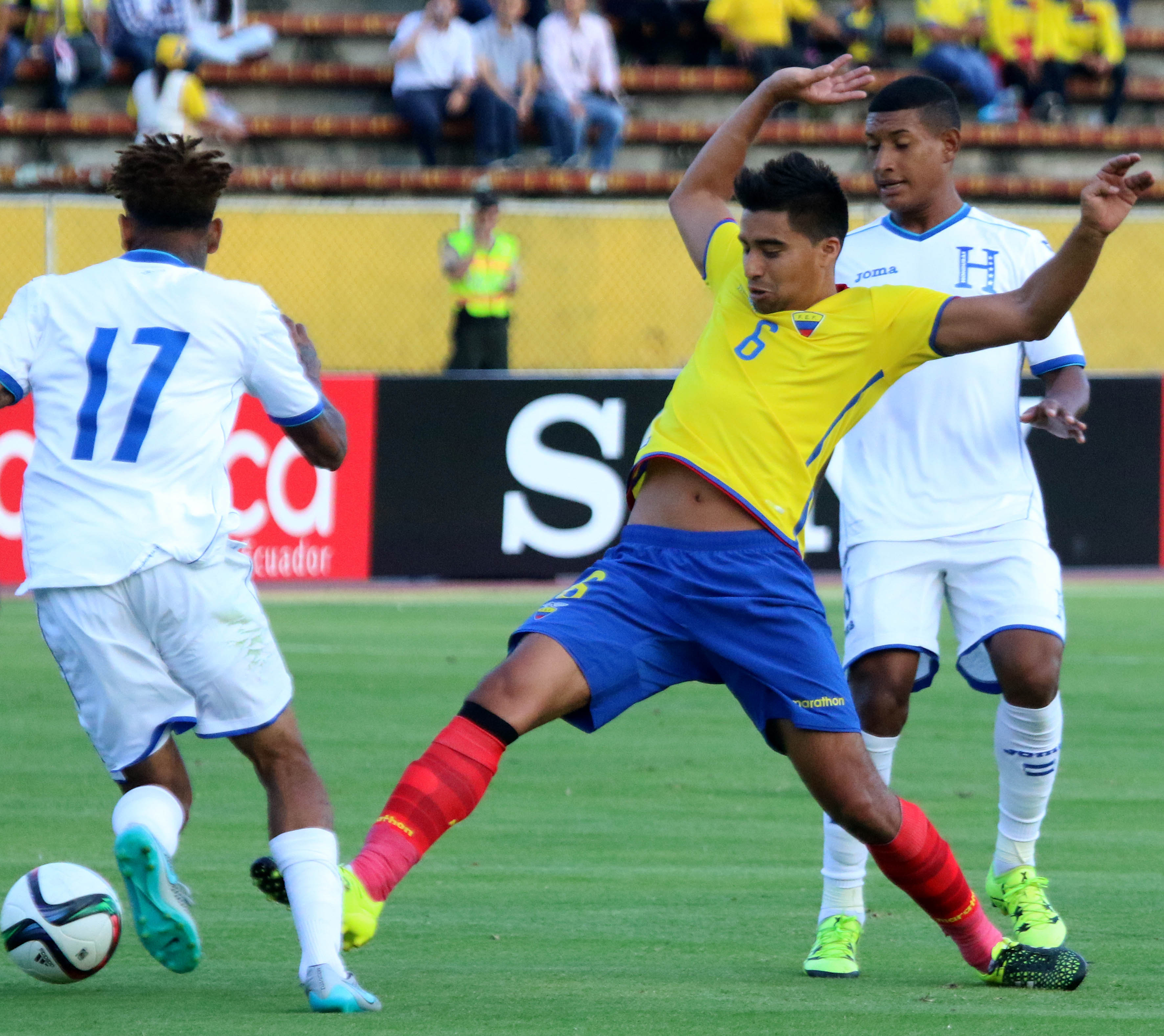
Noboa playing for Ecuador in 2015.

Noboa was called up to the Ecuador national team for a series of two unofficial friendly matches in late 2006 against Spanish provincial sides.

Under Sixto Vizuete's current management, he made his official debut against Brazil in a 2010 World Cup qualifiers. In the match, Noboa scored a wonderful goal to tie the game in the 89th minute for his first international goal. Noboa may have saved Ecuador's qualification dreams as he scored his second goal in as many games against Paraguay on 1 April 2009. On 7 June 2009, in a World Cup qualification match he helped Ecuador beat Peru 2–1 in Lima.

== Career statistics ==
=== Club ===
As of match played 10 December 2023

Appearances and goals by club, season and competition
Club	Season	League			National Cup		Continental		Other		Total	
Club	Season	Division	Apps	Goals	Apps	Goals	Apps	Goals	Apps	Goals	Apps	Goals
Emelec	2004	Serie A	28	3	–		0	0	–		28	3
Emelec	2005	Serie A	28	1	–		0	0	–		28	1
Emelec	2006	Serie A	33	4	–		0	0	–		33	4
Emelec	Total		89	8	0	0	0	0	0	0	89	8
Rubin Kazan	2007	Russian Premier League	14	1	3	0	3 (Note: Appearance(s) in UEFA Intertoto Cup)	0	–		20	1
Rubin Kazan	2008	Russian Premier League	21	6	1	0	–		–		22	6
Rubin Kazan	2009	Russian Premier League	22	2	2	0	6 (Note: Appearance(s) in UEFA Champions League)	0	–		30	2
Rubin Kazan	2010	Russian Premier League	27	8	0	0	10 (Note: Four appearances and one goal in the UEFA Europa League, and Six appearances and two goals in the UEFA Champions League)	3	1 (Note: Appearance(s) in Russian Super Cup)	0	38	11
Rubin Kazan	2011–12	Russian Premier League	25	5	1	0	12 (Note: Eight appearances and one goal in the UEFA Europa League, and Four appearances in the UEFA Champions League)	2	–		38	7
Rubin Kazan	Total		109	22	7	0	31	5	1	0	148	27
Dynamo Moscow	2011–12	Russian Premier League	11	0	2	0	–		–		13	0
Dynamo Moscow	2012–13	Russian Premier League	27	5	2	0	2 (Note: Appearance(s) in UEFA Europa League)	0	–		31	5
Dynamo Moscow	2013–14	Russian Premier League	29	6	0	0	–		–		29	6
Dynamo Moscow	2014–15	Russian Premier League	11	1	0	0	8	0	–		19	1
Dynamo Moscow	Total		78	12	4	0	10	0	0	0	92	12
PAOK	2014–15	Super League Greece	14	2	0	0	–		3 (Note: Appearances in the UEFA play-offs)	0	17	2
Rostov	2015–16	Russian Premier League	24	4	0	0	–		–		24	4
Rostov	2016–17	Russian Premier League	26	2	0	0	14 (Note: Ten appearances and four goals in the UEFA Champions League, and Four appearances and one goal in the UEFA Europa League)	5	–		40	7
Rostov	Total		50	6	0	0	14	5	0	0	64	11
Zenit St.Petersburg	2017–18	Russian Premier League	2	0	1	0	6	0	–		9	0
Zenit St.Petersburg	2018–19	Russian Premier League	11	0	0	0	1	1	–		12	1
Zenit St.Petersburg	2019–20	Russian Premier League	0	0	0	0	0	0	1	0	1	0
Zenit St.Petersburg	Total		13	0	1	0	7	1	1	0	22	1
Rubin Kazan (loan)	2017–18	Russian Premier League	10	2	0	0	–		–		10	2
Sochi	2019–20	Russian Premier League	19	4	0	0	–		–		19	4
Sochi	2020–21	Russian Premier League	25	12	2	0	–		–		27	12
Sochi	2021–22	Russian Premier League	25	7	1	1	3 (Note: Appearances in the UECL qualifiers)	2	–		29	10
Sochi	2022–23	Russian Premier League	26	11	1	0	–		–		27	11
Sochi	2023–24	Russian Premier League	11	2	3	1	–		–		14	3
Sochi	Total		106	36	7	2	3	2	0	0	116	40
Career total			469	88	19	2	65	13	5	0	558	103

=== International ===
As of 23 June 2021

Ecuador
Year	Apps	Goals
2009	8	2
2010	4	0
2011	10	0
2012	4	0
2013	13	0
2014	10	1
2015	12	0
2016	13	1
2017	3	0
2018	0	0
2019	1	0
2020	1	0
2021	4	0
Total	83	4

As of goal scored on 12 June 2016
Scores and results list Ecuador's goal tally first, score column indicates score after each Ecuador goal.

List of international goals scored by Christian Noboa
No.	Date	Venue	Opponent	Score	Result	Competition	Ref.
1	28 March 2009	Estadio Olímpico Atahualpa, Quito, Ecuador	Brazil	1–1	1–1	2010 FIFA World Cup qualification	
2	1 April 2009	Estadio Olímpico Atahualpa, Quito, Ecuador	Paraguay	1–0	1–1	2010 FIFA World Cup qualification	
3	6 September 2014	Lockhart Stadium, Fort Lauderdale, United States	Bolivia	1–0	4–0	International friendly	
4	12 June 2016	MetLife Stadium, East Rutherford, United States	Haiti	3–0	4–0	Copa América Centenario	

== Personal life ==
Noboa was married to Russian Olga Romanova, with whom he had two sons, Christopher and Lucas.

== Honours ==
Rubin Kazan

- Russian Premier League: 2008, 2009
- Russian Super Cup: 2010

Zenit Saint Petersburg

- Russian Premier League: 2018–19

Individual

- Russian Premier League Central Midfielder of the Season: 2020–21
- Russian Premier League Top assist provider: 2020–21
- Russian Premier League best player (as chosen by the Russian Football Union): 2021–22
