= Igor Portnyagin =

Russian footballer (born 1989)

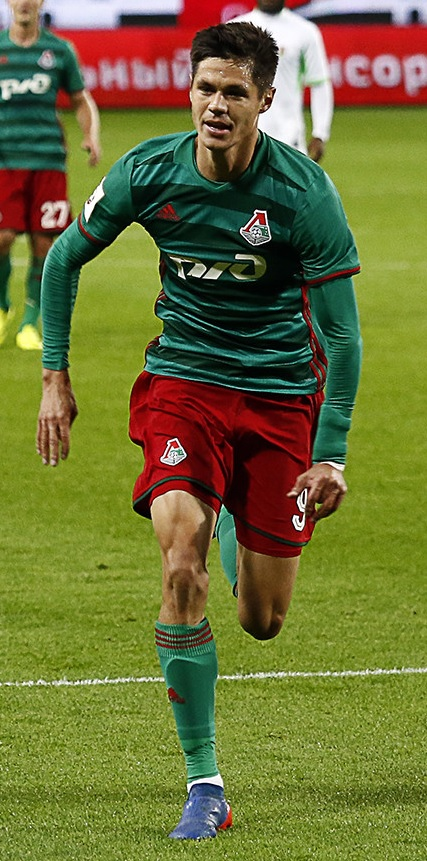
- Portnyagin with Lokomotiv in 2016

Personal information
- Full name: Igor Igorevich Portnyagin
- Date of birth: 7 January 1989 (age 37)
- Place of birth: Vladivostok, Russian SFSR, Soviet Union
- Height: 1.91 m (6 ft 3 in)
- Position: Forward

Youth career
- DYuSSh Izhevsk

Senior career*
Years	Team	Apps	(Gls)
2005–2007	FC Soyuz-Gazprom Izhevsk	26	(3)
2008–2016	FC Rubin Kazan	59	(16)
2011	→ PFC Spartak Nalchik (loan)	14	(1)
2011	→ PFC Spartak Nalchik (loan)	4	(0)
2012	→ FC Tom Tomsk (loan)	8	(0)
2012	→ FC Neftekhimik Nizhnekamsk (loan)	19	(16)
2013	→ FC Krylia Sovetov Samara (loan)	5	(0)
2013–2014	→ FC Tom Tomsk (loan)	28	(4)
2014–2015	→ FC Rubin-2 Kazan (loan)	4	(0)
2016–2019	FC Lokomotiv Moscow	4	(0)
2017–2018	→ FC Ural Yekaterinburg (loan)	12	(1)
2018	→ FC Khimki (loan)	12	(2)
2019	→ FC Baltika Kaliningrad (loan)	8	(0)
2019	FC Nizhny Novgorod	13	(5)

International career
2010	Russia U-21	1	(0)
2015	Russia	1	(0)
- * Club domestic league appearances and goals

Igor Igorevich Portnyagin (Russian: Игорь Игоревич Портнягин; born 7 January 1989) is a Russian former professional footballer who played as a forward.

== Club career ==
He made his debut for the senior squad of FC Rubin Kazan on 5 August 2008 in a Russian Cup game against FC Smena Komsomolsk-na-Amure. He made his Russian Premier League debut for Rubin on 4 April 2009 in a game against FC Moscow.

On 27 June 2017, he joined FC Ural Yekaterinburg on loan for the 2017–18 season.

On 17 January 2019, he joined FC Baltika Kaliningrad on loan until the end of the 2018–19 season.

He left Lokomotiv upon the expiration of his contract on 30 June 2019.

On 4 July 2019, he signed with FC Nizhny Novgorod.

== International ==
On 31 March 2015, Portnyagin made his debut for the Russia national football team in a friendly game against Kazakhstan.

== Honours ==
=== Club ===
Rubin Kazan

- Russian Football Premier League: 2009
- Russian Super Cup: 2010

Lokomotiv Moscow

- Russian Cup: 2016-17

== Career statistics ==
=== Club ===
As of 8 December 2017

Club	Season	League			Cup		Continental		Other		Total	
Club	Season	Division	Apps	Goals	Apps	Goals	Apps	Goals	Apps	Goals	Apps	Goals
FC SOYUZ-Gazprom Izhevsk	2005	PFL	6	1	0	0	–		–		6	1
FC SOYUZ-Gazprom Izhevsk	2006	PFL	10	0	2	0	–		–		12	0
FC SOYUZ-Gazprom Izhevsk	2007	PFL	10	2	1	0	–		–		11	2
FC SOYUZ-Gazprom Izhevsk	Total		26	3	3	0	0	0	0	0	29	3
FC Rubin Kazan	2008	Russian Premier League	0	0	1	0	–		–		1	0
FC Rubin Kazan	2009	Russian Premier League	2	1	1	0	0	0	–		3	1
FC Rubin Kazan	2010	Russian Premier League	4	0	0	0	1	0	–		5	0
PFC Spartak Nalchik	2011–12	Russian Premier League	14	1	0	0	–		–		14	1
FC Rubin Kazan	2011–12	Russian Premier League	1	0	0	0	0	0	–		1	0
PFC Spartak Nalchik	2011–12	Russian Premier League	4	0	–		–		–		4	0
PFC Spartak Nalchik	Total (2 spells)		18	1	0	0	0	0	0	0	18	1
FC Tom Tomsk	2011–12	Russian Premier League	8	0	–		–		–		8	0
FC Neftekhimik Nizhnekamsk	2012–13	FNL	19	16	1	0	–		–		20	16
FC Rubin Kazan	2012–13	Russian Premier League	–		–		0	0	–		0	0
FC Krylia Sovetov Samara	2012–13	Russian Premier League	5	0	–		–		2 (Note: Two appearances in relegation play-offs)	2	7	2
FC Tom Tomsk	2013–14	Russian Premier League	28	4	2	2	–		2 (Note: Two appearances in relegation play-offs)	1	32	7
FC Tom Tomsk	Total (2 spells)		36	4	2	2	0	0	2	1	40	7
FC Rubin-2 Kazan	2014–15	PFL	4	0	–		–		–		4	0
FC Rubin Kazan	2014–15	Russian Premier League	26	11	2	1	–		–		28	12
FC Rubin Kazan	2015–16	Russian Premier League	24	4	0	0	7	1	–		31	5
FC Rubin Kazan	2016–17	Russian Premier League	2	0	–		–		–		2	0
FC Rubin Kazan	Total (4 spells)		59	16	4	1	8	1	0	0	71	18
FC Lokomotiv Moscow	2016–17	Russian Premier League	4	0	1	1	–		–		5	1
FC Ural Yekaterinburg	2017–18	Russian Premier League	7	1	0	0	–		–		7	1
Career total			178	41	11	4	8	1	4	3	201	49
