= Alan Kasaev =

Russian footballer (born 1986)

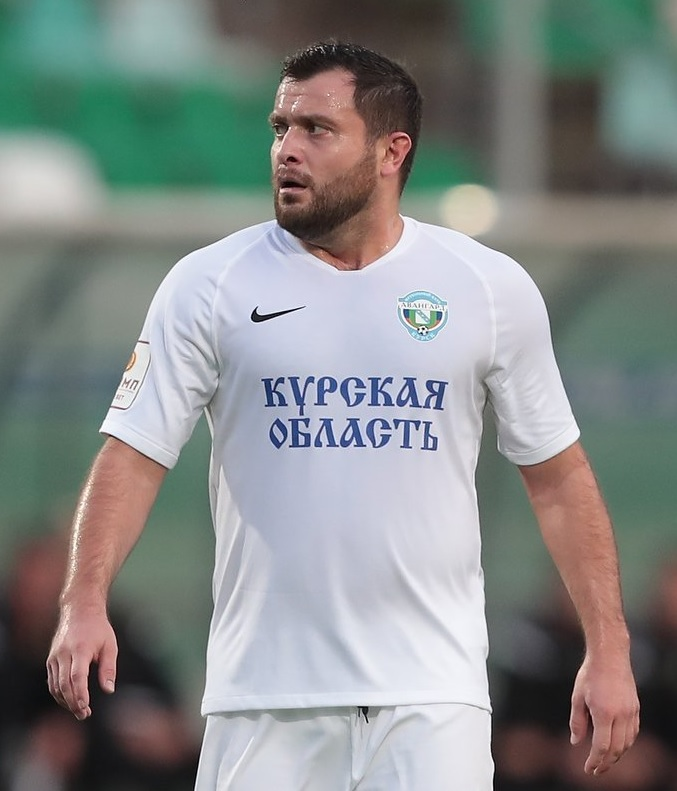
- Kasaev with Avangard Kursk in 2019

Personal information
- Full name: Alan Taimurazovich Kasaev
- Date of birth: 8 April 1986 (age 40)
- Place of birth: Tursunzoda, Tajik SSR
- Height: 1.74 m (5 ft 9 in)
- Position: Midfielder

Youth career
- Spartak Vladikavkaz

Senior career*
Years	Team	Apps	(Gls)
2002	Titan Reutov	14	(0)
2003	Shinnik Yaroslavl	0	(0)
2004–2007	Zenit St. Petersburg	0	(0)
2007	→ Alania Vladikavkaz (loan)	36	(3)
2008–2009	Kuban Krasnodar	54	(10)
2009–2014	Rubin Kazan	88	(12)
2013–2014	→ Dynamo Moscow (loan)	19	(3)
2014–2019	Lokomotiv Moscow	70	(7)
2018	→ Baltika Kaliningrad (loan)	21	(1)
2019	→ Sochi (loan)	11	(0)
2019	Avangard Kursk	13	(1)
2020	Alania Vladikavkaz	1	(0)

International career
2008	Russia U-21	4	(1)
2011	Russia-2	1	(0)
- * Club domestic league appearances and goals

Alan Taimurazovich Kasaev (Russian: Алан Таймуразович Касаев; born 8 April 1986) is a Russian former football player of Ossetian descent who played as a left winger.

== Club career ==
He made his Russian Premier League debut for FC Kuban Krasnodar on 14 March 2009 in a game against FC Rubin Kazan.

On 16 May 2014, he joined FC Lokomotiv Moscow.

He spent the first half of the 2018–19 season on loan at FC Baltika Kaliningrad before his loan was terminated on 25 January 2019. On 28 January 2019, he joined Sochi on loan for the remainder of the season. He left Lokomotiv as his contract expired on 30 June 2019.

== Career statistics ==
As of 24 November 2018

Club	Div	Season	League		Cup		Europe		Other		Total	
Club	Div	Season	Apps	Goals	Apps	Goals	Apps	Goals	Apps	Goals	Apps	Goals
(Russia) Titan Reutov	D3	2002	14	0	0	0	—		—		14	0
(Russia) Titan Reutov	Total		14	0	0	0	0	0	0	0	14	0
(Russia) Shinnik Yaroslavl	D1	2003	0	0	0	0	—		—		0	0
(Russia) Shinnik Yaroslavl	Total		0	0	0	0	0	0	0	0	0	0
(Russia) Zenit SPb	D1	2004	0	0	0	0	—		—		0	0
(Russia) Zenit SPb	D1	2005	0	0	3	0	—		—		3	0
(Russia) Zenit SPb	D1	2006	0	0	0	0	—		—		0	0
(Russia) Zenit SPb	Total		0	0	3	0	0	0	0	0	3	0
(Russia) Alania Vladikavkaz	D2	2007	36	3	1	0	—		—		37	3
(Russia) Alania Vladikavkaz	Total		36	3	1	0	0	0	0	0	37	3
(Russia) Kuban Krasnodar	D2	2008	38	8	1	0	—		—		39	8
(Russia) Kuban Krasnodar	D1	2009	16	2	0	0	—		—		16	2
(Russia) Kuban Krasnodar	Total		54	10	1	0	0	0	0	0	55	10
(Russia) Rubin Kazan	D1	2009	10	1	0	0	4	0	—		14	1
(Russia) Rubin Kazan	D1	2010	28	5	1	0	8	1	—		37	6
(Russia) Rubin Kazan	D1	2011–12	30	4	3	1	11	1	—		44	6
(Russia) Rubin Kazan	D1	2012–13	20	2	1	0	10	1	—		31	3
(Russia) Rubin Kazan	Total		88	12	5	1	33	3	0	0	126	16
(Russia) Dynamo Moscow	D1	2013–14	19	3	1	0	—		—		20	3
(Russia) Dynamo Moscow	Total		19	3	1	0	0	0	0	0	20	3
(Russia) Lokomotiv Moscow	D1	2014–15	26	3	3	0	2	1	—		31	4
(Russia) Lokomotiv Moscow	D1	2015–16	24	3	1	0	5	0	1	0	31	3
(Russia) Lokomotiv Moscow	D1	2016–17	18	1	1	1	0	0	0	0	19	2
(Russia) Lokomotiv Moscow	D1	2017–18	2	0	0	0	0	0	0	0	2	0
Total			70	7	5	1	7	1	1	0	83	9
(Russia) Baltika Kaliningrad	D2	2018–19	21	1	1	1	—		—		22	2
(Russia) Baltika Kaliningrad	Total		21	1	1	1	0	0	0	0	22	2
Career total			302	36	17	3	40	4	1	0	360	43

== Honours ==
Rubin

- Russian Premier League (1): 2009
- Russian Cup (1): 2011-12
- Russian Super Cup (2): 2010, 2012

Lokomotiv Moscow

- Russian Premier League (1): 2017–18
- Russian Cup (2): 2014–15, 2016–17
