= MacBeth Sibaya =

South African soccer player and coach

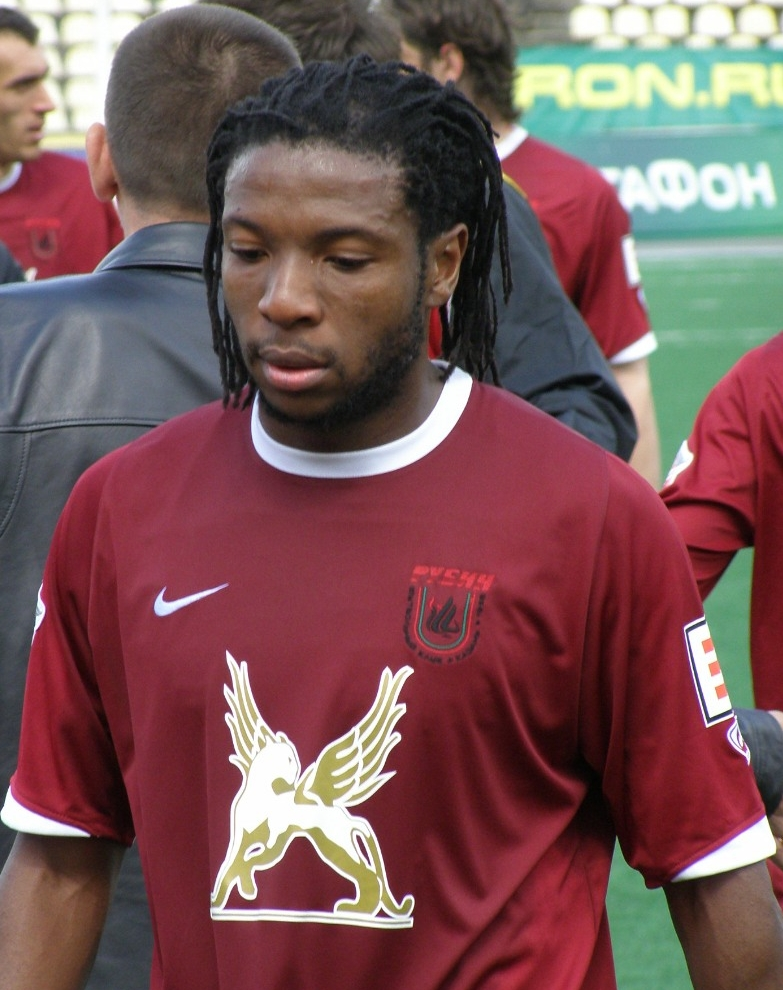
- Sibaya with Rubin Kazan in May 2009

Personal information
- Full name: Ntuthuko MacBeth-Mao Sibaya
- Date of birth: 25 November 1977 (age 48)
- Place of birth: Durban, South Africa
- Height: 1.75 m (5 ft 9 in)
- Position: Defensive midfielder

Team information
- Current team: KZN Academy (U19 manager)

Youth career
- Aston Villa Durban
- Mpumalanga Youngsters
- 1998–1999: III. Kerület

Senior career*
Years	Team	Apps	(Gls)
1998–1999	III. Kerület	8	(0)
1999–2002	Jomo Cosmos	59	(6)
2002–2003	Rosenborg	4	(0)
2003–2010	Rubin Kazan	131	(3)
2011–2013	Moroka Swallows	37	(1)
Total		239	(10)

International career
2001–2013	South Africa	62	(0)

Managerial career
- 2013–2015: SuperSport United (analyst)
- 2015–2018: SuperSport United (reserves)
- 2021–: KZN Academy (U19)
- * Club domestic league appearances and goals

Ntuthuko MacBeth-Mao Sibaya (born 25 November 1977), known as MacBeth Sibaya, is a South African professional football coach and a former player who played as a defensive midfielder. He coaches at the KZN Academy.

== Club career ==
Sibaya was born in Durban, KwaZulu-Natal. He previously played for III. Kerületi TUE in Hungary as well as Jomo Cosmos in South Africa, Rosenborg BK in Norway and FC Rubin Kazan in Russia.

== International career ==
Sibaya was a regular for the South Africa national football team, having amassed a total of 62 caps. He was part of the final squads at the 2002 and 2010 World Cups.

== Coaching career ==
After retiring, Sibaya started working as an analyst at SuperSport United. In August 2015, Sibaya was appointed manager of SuperSport United's reserve team. He later resigned to concentrate on his coaching badges.

In February 2021, Sibaya was appointed U19 manager at the KwaZulu-Natal Football Academy.

== Honors ==
Rubin Kazan

- Russian Premier League; 2008, 2009
- Russian Super Cup; 2010
- CIS Cup; 2010
- La Manga Cup; 2005, 2006
