= Yevgeni Cheremisin =

Russian footballer

Evgeniy Cheremisin
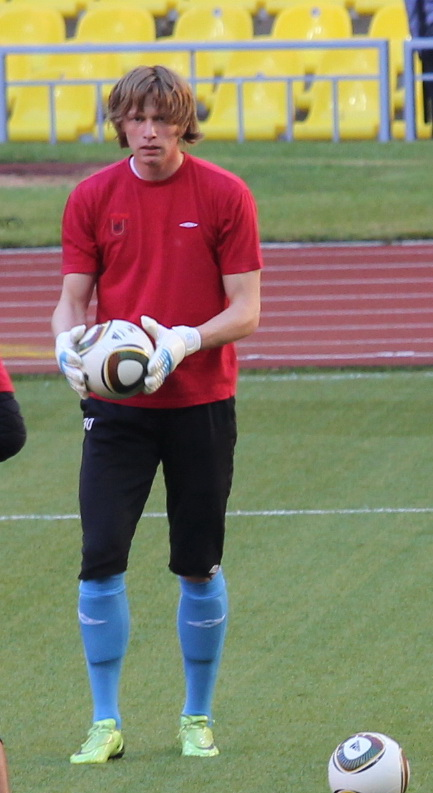

Personal information
- Full name: Evgeniy Gennadyevich Cheremisin
- Date of birth: February 29, 1988 (age 38)
- Place of birth: Naberezhnye Chelny, Russian SFSR
- Height: 1.92 m (6 ft 4 in)
- Position: Goalkeeper

Youth career
- Neftekhimik

Senior career*
Years	Team	Apps	(Gls)
2004–2007	Neftekhimik	36	(0)
2008–2010	Rubin Kazan	0	(0)
2008	→ Rubin-2 Kazan (loan)	5	(0)
2010	→ Dynamo St. Petersburg (loan)	2	(0)
2011–2012	Neftekhimik	2	(0)
2012–2013	Rubin-2 Kazan	25	(0)
2013–2014	Rubin Kazan	0	(0)
2013	→ Fakel Voronezh (loan)	1	(0)
2014	→ Neftekhimik (loan)	0	(0)
2014	KAMAZ	0	(0)
2015–2016	Neftchi	30	(0)
2018–2019	Qizilqum	43	(0)
2020	Kaganat		
- * Club domestic league appearances and goals

Evgeniy Gennadyevich Cheremisin (Russian: Евгений Геннадьевич Черемисин; born 29 February 1988) is a Russian former footballer.

== Career ==
Cheremisin made his professional debut for Rubin Kazan on 13 July 2010 in the Russian Cup game against FC Volgar-Gazprom Astrakhan.

== Honours ==
- Russian Super Cup: 2010
