= Kurban Berdyev =

Russian footballer and manager (born 1952)

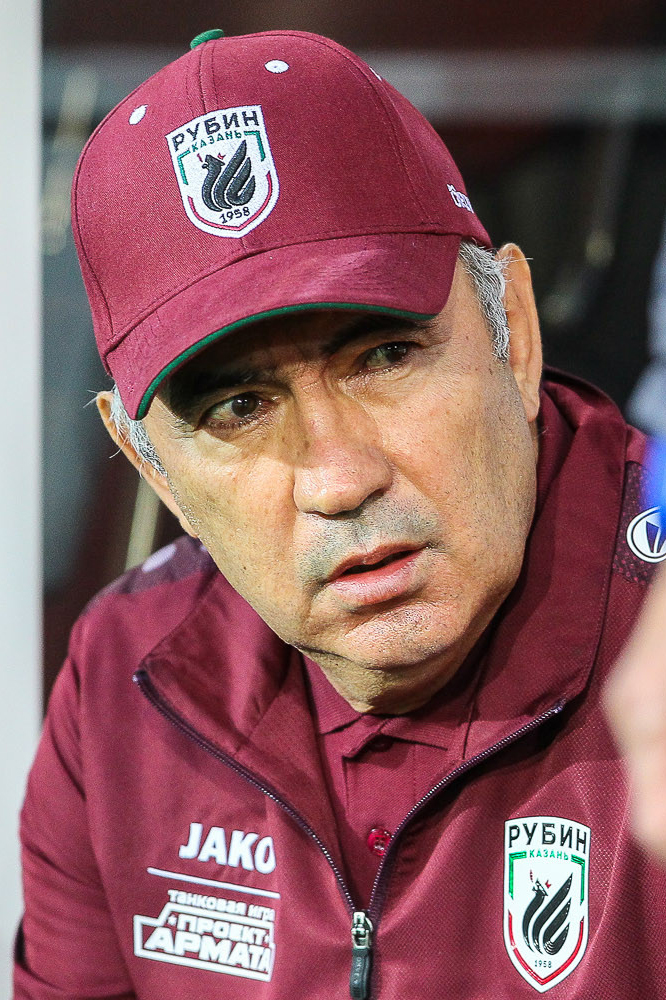
- Berdyev managing Rubin Kazan in 2017

Personal information
- Full name: Kurban Bekiyevich Berdyev
- Date of birth: 25 August 1952 (age 74)
- Place of birth: Ashgabat, Turkmen SSR, Soviet Union
- Height: 1.78 m (5 ft 10 in)
- Position: Midfielder

Team information
- Current team: Turan Tovuz (manager)

Senior career*
Years	Team	Apps	(Gls)
1971–1977	Kolhozçy Aşgabat	134	(16)
1977–1978	Kairat	20	(5)
1978–1979	Kolhozçy Aşgabat	38	(3)
1979–1980	SKA Rostov-on-Don	35	(3)
1980–1981	Rostselmash Rostov-on-Don	30	(5)
1981–1985	Kairat	139	(28)
Total		396	(60)

Managerial career
- 1986–1989: Khimik Dzhambul
- 1991–1993: Taraz
- 1993–1994: Gençlerbirliği
- 1994–1995: Kairat
- 1996–1997: Caspiy
- 1997–1999: Nisa Aşgabat
- 1999: Turkmenistan
- 2000–2001: Kristall Smolensk
- 2001–2013: Rubin Kazan
- 2014–2017: Rostov
- 2017–2019: Rubin Kazan
- 2021–2022: Kairat
- 2022: Tractor
- 2022–2023: Sochi
- 2023–2024: Dynamo Makhachkala
- 2024–: Turan Tovuz
- * Club domestic league appearances and goals

Kurban Bekiyevich Berdyev (Turkmen: Gurban Bekiýewiç Berdiýew, Russian: Курбан Бекиевич Бердыев; born 25 August 1952) is a Turkmen-Russian football manager, and a former Soviet footballer who is in charge of the Azerbaijani club Turan Tovuz. In 2017 he was included among top 50 managers in the world by fourfourtwo.com, at the 36th place, ahead of Brendan Rodgers.

== Career ==
=== Playing career ===
Berdyev grew up with Kolhozçy Aşgabat where he played in cadet and junior teams since 1966. He joined the professional team in 1971.

- Soviet Top League (7 seasons, 155 games, 23 goals) – FC Kairat (1977, 1981, 1982, 1984, 1985), FC SKA Rostov-on-Don (1979, 1980). Highest place- 8th with Kairat (1977, 1984).
- Soviet First League (7 seasons, 211 games, 32 goals) – Kolhozçy Aşgabat (1971, 1972, 1973, 1974, 1976, 1978), FC Kairat (1983), First League Winner with FC Kairat in 1983.
- Soviet Second League (2 seasons) – Kolhozçy Aşgabat (1975), FC Rostov (1980).

=== Coaching career ===
It was in Rubin Kazan where Berdyev made his name as a coach getting the team promoted to Russian Premier League in 2002, and grabbing the bronze medals there in their debut year (2003).

All the highest-tier titles of Rubin were won with Berdyev as a manager: these were Russian Premier League titles in 2008 and 2009, Russian Cup in 2011–12 and Russian Super Cup in 2010 and 2012.

Berdyev was fired from Rubin on 20 December 2013 and a year later, on 18 December 2014, was appointed as a manager of FC Rostov. In the end of 2014–15 season, Rostov stayed up in the Russian Premier League by winning the relegation play-offs. In the 2015–16 season, Rostov unexpectedly qualified the Champions League spot, taking the 2nd spot in the league. Berdyev resigned from Rostov on 6 August 2016. On 9 September 2016, he returned to FC Rostov to the position of vice-president/coach. On 1 June 2017, he left FC Rostov once more.

On 9 June 2017, he returned to FC Rubin Kazan. On 5 June 2019, he left Rubin once again.

On 24 August 2021, Berdyev was appointed manager of the Kazakhstan Premier League club FC Kairat. Berdyev left Kairat by mutual consent on 6 June 2022.

On 20 June 2022, Berdyev was hired by Tractor in Iran.

On 25 December 2022, Berdyev was hired by Russian Premier League club Sochi. He was fired by Sochi on 10 April 2023, after just 5 games at the helm (2 wins and 3 losses).

On 9 July 2023, Dynamo Makhachkala announced the appointment of Berdyev as head coach. Berdyev resigned from Dynamo on 1 February 2024, with the club in the first place in the standings.

On 25 June 2024, Berdyev was appointed as head coach of Azerbaijan Premier League club Turan Tovuz.

== Managerial statistics ==
As of 9 October 2026

Managerial record by team and tenure
Team	Nat	From	To	Record				
Team	Nat	From	To	G	W	D	L	Win %
Khimik Dzhambul	(Soviet Union)	1 January 1986	30 June 1989	134	71	18	45	52.99
Taraz	(Kazakhstan)	1 January 1991	30 June 1993	120	58	21	41	48.33
Gençlerbirliği	(Turkey)	1 July 1993	29 December 1993	16	7	3	6	43.75
Kairat	(Kazakhstan)	1 April 1994	31 December 1995	63	23	10	30	36.51
Caspiy	(Kazakhstan)	1 January 1996	31 December 1996	42	24	10	8	57.14
Nisa	(Turkmenistan)	1 January 1998	30 June 1999	39	26	7	6	66.67
Turkmenistan	(Turkmenistan)	1 January 1999	30 June 1999	3	0	1	2	0.00
Kristall	(Russia)	15 May 2000	30 July 2001	51	25	7	19	49.02
Rubin Kazan	(Russia)	4 August 2001	20 December 2013	488	229	127	132	46.93
FC Rostov	(Russia)	18 December 2014	6 August 2016	48	28	10	10	58.33
Rubin Kazan	(Russia)	9 June 2017	5 June 2019	66	19	26	21	28.79
Kairat	(Kazakhstan)	24 August 2021	6 June 2022	32	14	8	10	43.75
Tractor	(Iran)	19 June 2022	24 November 2022	11	4	3	4	36.36
PFC Sochi	(Russia)	27 November 2022	10 April 2023	5	2	0	3	40.00
Dynamo Makhachkala	(Russia)	9 July 2023	1 February 2024	21	11	4	6	52.38
Turan Tovuz	(Azerbaijan)	25 June 2024	Present	80	37	25	18	46.25
Total				1,214	578	276	360	47.61

== Managerial honours ==
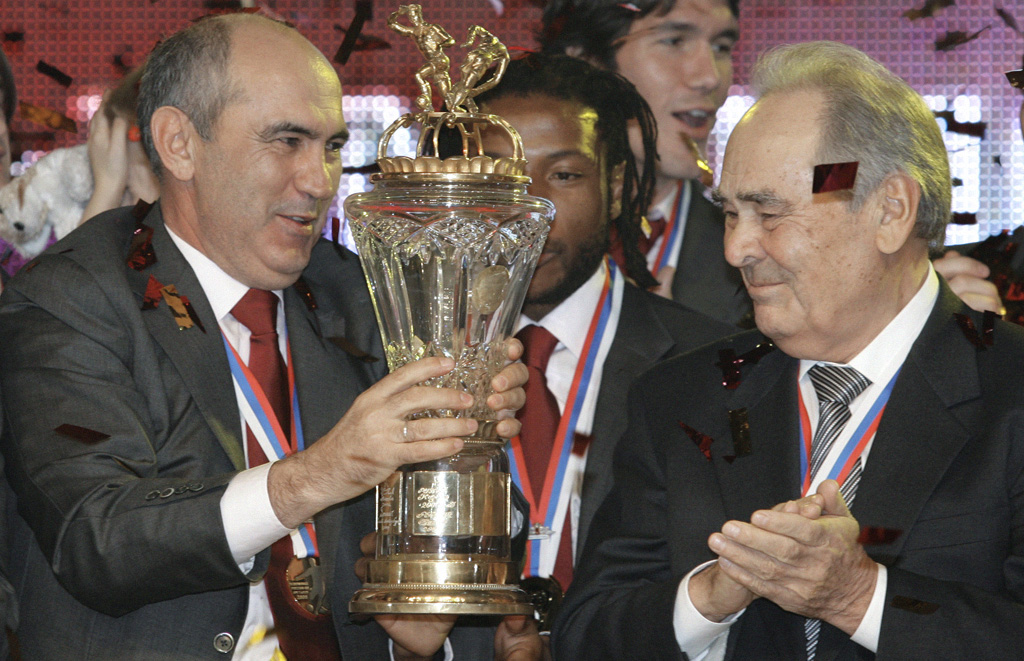
Kurban Berdyev and Tatarstan President Mintimer Shaimiev with the Russian Premier League Champions Cup during the ceremony of awarding FC Rubin with the Russian Premier League gold medals

Nisa

- Ýokary Liga: 1998–99
- Turkmenistan Cup: 1998

Rubin

- Russian Premier League: 2008, 2009
- Russian Cup: 2011–12
- Russian Super Cup: 2010, 2012
- Russian First Division: 2002

Rostov

- Russian Premier League runner-up: 2015–16

Kairat

- Kazakhstan Cup: 2021

Individual

- Russian Football Union Best Coach: 2009

=== Highest advances in the continental club competitions ===
- Asian Cup Winners' Cup – 2nd round (1998–1999)
- UEFA Champions League – 3rd place in the Group stage (2009–2010), (2010–2011), (2016–2017);
- UEFA Europa League – Quarterfinals (2012–2013)

== Personal life ==
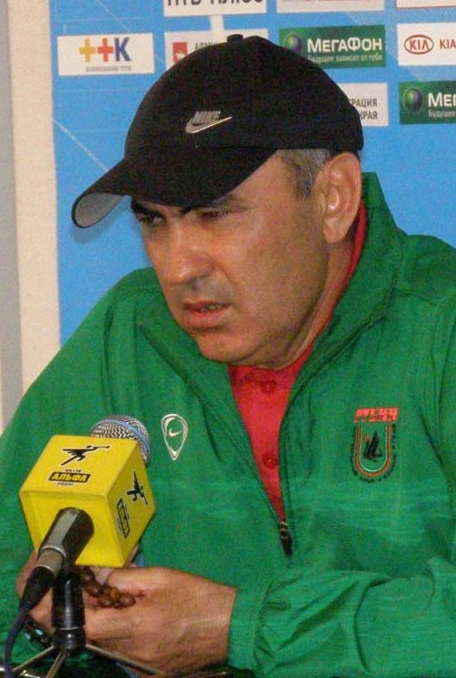
Berdyev has never appeared in public without his beads.

Berdyev always carries his pray beads with him. He never appears without them.

Education – Ashgabat Railroads Vocational School (1967–71), Turkmen State University (1971–1975), Moscow Higher Coaching School (1989–1991). In the Soviet Army 1979 – 80, first lieutenant.

Berdyev is known as a very introverted person.

Wife Roza Berdyeva. Berdyev has two sons and a daughter. The eldest son from his first marriage Marat Berdyyev (born 23.09.1975) is a British actor, musician and producer. Junior Alaberdy Berdyev (born 5.8.1996) – schoolboy, plays football in the "FC Rubin Kazan" youth academy. Daughter Aylar — a student. Kurban Berdyev's brother is Batyr Berdyev (born 1956), a coach of football club Fenix, Ashgabat. Another brother, Murad Berdyev (born 1954), died in 2003.

In 2012, he was decorated by the Russian Federation with the Order of Friendship Medal.

He holds Russian citizenship.

== Trivia ==
- One of the sectors of the Ak Bars Arena in Kazan has been named in honor of Kurban Berdyev. The name was chosen based on a vote by the club's fans.

== See also ==
- List of football managers with the most matches
