= Andrei Ryzhikov =

Russian footballer and coach

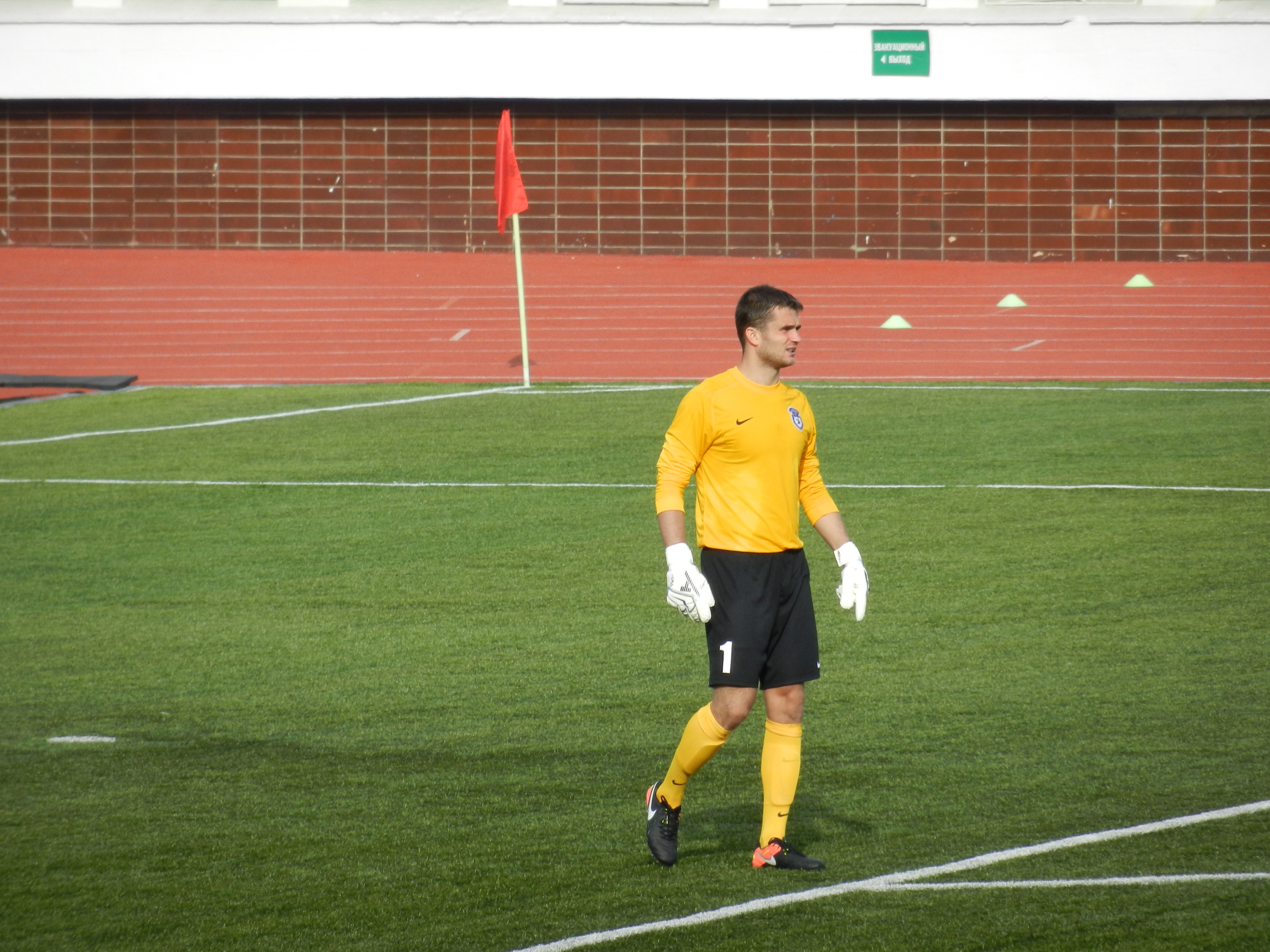

Personal information
- Full name: Andrei Viktorovich Ryzhikov
- Date of birth: 10 March 1988 (age 38)
- Place of birth: Shebekino, Russian SFSR
- Height: 1.85 m (6 ft 1 in)
- Position: Goalkeeper

Team information
- Current team: FC Kolomna (GK coach)

Youth career
- –1998: DYuSSh-3 Shebekino
- 1998–2002: Inter-Modul Stary Oskol
- 2002–2006: FC Rotor Volgograd

Senior career*
Years	Team	Apps	(Gls)
2006	FC Rotor Volgograd	0	(0)
2006	FC Saturn Ramenskoye	0	(0)
2008	FC Gubkin	7	(0)
2009–2010	FC Mordovia Saransk	30	(0)
2011–2012	FC Torpedo Moscow	0	(0)
2012–2013	FC Neftekhimik Nizhnekamsk	0	(0)
2013–2014	FC Dolgoprudny	25	(0)
2014–2015	FC Tekstilshchik Ivanovo	7	(0)
2015–2017	FC Energomash Belgorod	48	(1)
2017	FC Sokol Saratov	10	(0)

Managerial career
- 2020–: FC Kolomna (GK coach)
- * Club domestic league appearances and goals

Andrei Viktorovich Ryzhikov (Russian: Андрей Викторович Рыжиков; born 10 March 1988) is a Russian professional football coach and a former player. He is the goalkeeping coach at FC Kolomna.

== Club career ==
He played in the Russian Football National League for FC Mordovia Saransk in 2010.

== Personal life ==
He is the younger brother of Sergei Ryzhikov.
