= Jordi Figueras =

Spanish footballer (born 1987)

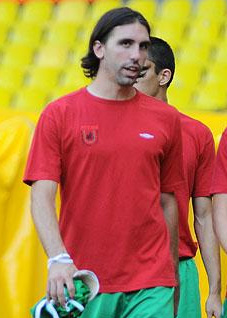
- Jordi with Rubin Kazan in 2010

Personal information
- Full name: Jordi Figueras Montel
- Date of birth: 16 May 1987 (age 39)
- Place of birth: Lleida, Spain
- Height: 1.85 m (6 ft 1 in)
- Position: Centre-back

Youth career
- 1992–2004: Lleida

Senior career*
Years	Team	Apps	(Gls)
2004–2005	Lleida	0	(0)
2005–2008	Real Madrid C		
2008–2009	Celta B	24	(5)
2009–2010	Celta	30	(1)
2010–2012	Rubin Kazan	8	(0)
2010–2011	→ Valladolid (loan)	23	(2)
2011–2012	→ Rayo Vallecano (loan)	17	(0)
2012–2013	Club Brugge	33	(1)
2013	→ Rayo Vallecano (loan)	14	(0)
2013–2016	Betis	67	(1)
2016	Eskişehirspor	16	(0)
2016–2017	Karlsruher SC	17	(2)
2017–2018	ATK	15	(0)
2018–2021	Racing Santander	63	(5)
2021–2023	Algeciras	52	(1)
Total		379+	(18+)
- * Club domestic league appearances and goals

Jordi Figueras Montel (born 16 May 1987) is a Spanish former professional footballer who played as a central defender.

== Club career ==
Born in Lleida, Catalonia, Figueras had an unsuccessful short spell at Real Madrid where he arrived at age 18 from his hometown club UE Lleida, only playing for the C side. He then moved to RC Celta de Vigo, initially being assigned to the reserves.

In the 2009–10 season, Figueras was firmly established in Celta's starting XI, with the Galicians in the Segunda División. However, on 17 February 2010, he was sold to Russia's FC Rubin Kazan for €850,000, joining compatriot César Navas.

Figueras returned to his country in 2010–11, being loaned to second-tier Real Valladolid. In the summer of 2011, he joined Rayo Vallecano on loan for the season.

Figueras made his debut in the Spanish top flight on 28 August 2011, starting in a 1–1 away draw against Athletic Bilbao. He played the full 90 minutes in all the games in the first part of the season but, on 19 January 2012, moved teams and countries again, signing a four-and-a-half-year contract with Club Brugge KV of the Belgian Pro League following a successful medical.

Figueras returned to Spain in January 2013, serving a small loan at Rayo and subsequently joining Real Betis on a permanent basis. He scored once from 25 matches in his debut campaign with the latter, which ended in top-division relegation, then started in all his 39 appearances the following year in an immediate promotion as champions.

On 28 July 2016, after a brief spell in the Turkish Süper Lig with Eskişehirspor, Figueras agreed to a two-year deal with German club Karlsruher SC. He moved to the Indian Super League with ATK in September 2017, being appointed captain due to injury to Robbie Keane.

On 22 June 2018, Figueras returned to his native country and signed with Racing de Santander for three years.

== Career statistics ==
As of match played on 9 June 2019

Club statistics
Club	Season	League			Cup		Continental		Other		Total	
Club	Season	Division	Apps	Goals	Apps	Goals	Apps	Goals	Apps	Goals	Apps	Goals
Celta B	2008–09	Segunda División B	24	5	—		—		—		24	5
Celta	2008–09	Segunda División	15	0	0	0	—		—		15	0
Celta	2009–10	Segunda División	15	1	2	0	—		—		17	1
Celta	Total		30	1	2	0	—		—		32	1
Rubin Kazan	2010	Russian Premier League	8	0	1	0	—		0	0	9	0
Valladolid (loan)	2010–11	Segunda División	23	2	2	0	—		2 (Note: Appearances in La Liga play-offs)	0	27	2
Rayo Vallecano (loan)	2011–12	La Liga	17	0	2	0	—		—		19	0
Club Brugge	2011–12	Belgian Pro League	18	1	0	0	2 (Note: Appearances in UEFA Europa League)	0	—		20	1
Club Brugge	2012–13	Belgian Pro League	15	0	2	1	10 (Note: Appearances in UEFA Europa League and UEFA Champions League)	1	—		27	2
Club Brugge	Total		33	1	2	1	12	1	—		47	3
Rayo Vallecano (loan)	2012–13	La Liga	14	0	0	0	—		—		14	0
Betis	2013–14	La Liga	25	1	2	0	9	0	—		36	1
Betis	2014–15	Segunda División	39	0	3	0	—		—		42	0
Betis	2015–16	La Liga	3	0	3	0	—		—		6	0
Betis	Total		67	1	8	0	9	0	—		84	1
Eskişehirspor	2015–16	Süper Lig	16	0	2	0	—		—		18	0
Karlsruher SC	2016–17	2. Bundesliga	17	2	1	0	—		—		18	2
ATK	2017–18	Indian Super League	15	0	2	0	—		—		17	0
Racing Santander	2018–19	Segunda División B	20	3	3	0	—		1 (Note: Appearance in Segunda División B play-offs)	0	24	3
Career total			284	15	25	1	21	1	3	0	333	17

== Honours ==
Betis

- Segunda División: 2014–15
