= Vladimir Chernov (footballer) =

Russian footballer

Personal information
- Full name: Vladimir Andreyevich Chernov
- Date of birth: 15 January 1991 (age 35)
- Place of birth: Kazan, Russia
- Height: 1.87 m (6 ft 2 in)
- Position: Midfielder

Senior career*
| Years | Team | Apps | (Gls) |
| 2008–2010 | FC Rubin Kazan | 0 | (0) |
| 2011 | FC Gornyak Uchaly | 0 | (0) |
- * Club domestic league appearances and goals

Vladimir Andreyevich Chernov (Russian: Владимир Андреевич Чернов; born 15 January 1991) is a former Russian footballer.

== Career ==
Cheremisin made his professional debut for Rubin Kazan on 13 July 2010 in the Russian Cup game against FC Volgar-Gazprom Astrakhan.
