= Aleksandr Kolobaev =

Russian football referee

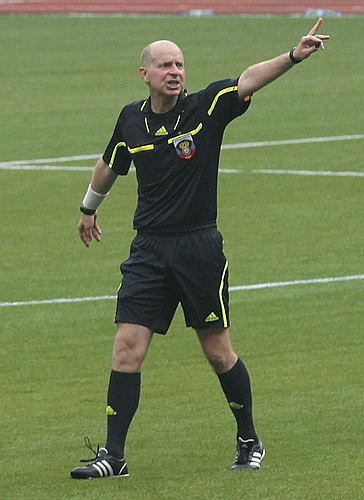
Aleksandr Kolobaev

Aleksandr Yevgenievich Kolobaev (Russian: Александр Евгеньевич Колобаев; born 18 May 1962 in Moscow, RSFSR, USSR) is a football referee. Judicial career began in 1985. Premier Division Matches judge since 2000. In 2007, he was included in the top five of arbitrators according to the CFA. Chief referee final Russian Cup 2010. Referee National Category. The coach-teacher.

In 2004 Kolobaev was the victim of the attack, which experts linked to his professional activities, after which the board of Russian football referees nominated safeguards requirement, otherwise, reserving the right to boycott the matches of the national championship.
