= Andrei Gorbanets =

Russian footballer

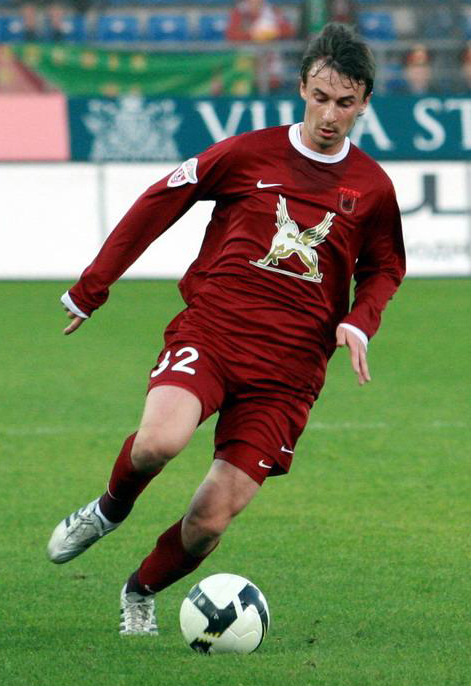
- Gorbanets with Rubin Kazan in 2009

Personal information
- Full name: Andrei Igorevich Gorbanets
- Date of birth: 24 August 1985 (age 41)
- Place of birth: Kamyshin, Russian SFSR
- Height: 1.78 m (5 ft 10 in)
- Position: Midfielder

Team information
- Current team: Dynamo-2 Moscow (fitness coach)

Youth career
- Saturn Ramenskoye

Senior career*
Years	Team	Apps	(Gls)
2005–2006	Saturn Ramenskoye	3	(0)
2007–2008	Sibir Novosibirsk	76	(10)
2009–2011	Rubin Kazan	28	(1)
2011–2012	Krasnodar	1	(0)
2011–2012	→ Mordovia Saransk (loan)	25	(2)
2012–2013	Tom Tomsk	19	(4)
2013–2015	Ural Yekaterinburg	14	(0)
2015	→ Tom Tomsk (loan)	0	(0)
2016	Arsenal Tula	18	(1)
2017	Taraz	25	(0)
2018	Rotor Volgograd	6	(1)
2019–2020	Dolgoprudny	20	(6)
2020–2021	Olimp-Dolgoprudny	21	(4)
2021–2022	Olimp-Dolgoprudny-2	23	(3)
2023	Kosmos Dolgoprudny	1	(0)

Managerial career
- 2023–2024: Kosmos Dolgoprudny (fitness coach)
- 2024–: Dynamo-2 Moscow (fitness coach)
- * Club domestic league appearances and goals

Andrei Igorevich Gorbanets (Russian: Андрей Игоревич Горбанец; born 24 August 1985) is a Russian football coach and a former football player. He is a fitness coach with Dynamo-2 Moscow.

== Club career ==
He made his debut in the Russian Premier League in 2006 for Saturn Ramenskoye.

== Career statistics ==
Club	Season	League			Cup		Continental		Other		Total	
Club	Season	Division	Apps	Goals	Apps	Goals	Apps	Goals	Apps	Goals	Apps	Goals
Saturn Ramenskoye	2004	Russian Premier League	0	0	0	0	–		–		0	0
Saturn Ramenskoye	2005	Russian Premier League	3	0	1	0	–		–		4	0
Saturn Ramenskoye	2006	Russian Premier League	0	0	1	0	–		–		1	0
Saturn Ramenskoye	Total		3	0	2	0	0	0	0	0	5	0
Sibir Novosibirsk	2007	Russian First League	37	7	3	0	–		–		40	7
Sibir Novosibirsk	2008	Russian First League	39	3	3	1	–		–		42	4
Sibir Novosibirsk	Total		76	10	6	1	0	0	0	0	82	11
Rubin Kazan	2009	Russian Premier League	11	0	2	1	0	0	1 (Note: Appearance in the Russian Super Cup)	0	14	1
Rubin Kazan	2010	Russian Premier League	17	1	0	0	2 (Note: Appearances in the UEFA Europa League)	0	1	0	20	1
Rubin Kazan	Total		28	1	2	1	2	0	2	0	34	2
Krasnodar	2011–12	Russian Premier League	1	0	0	0	–		–		1	0
Mordovia Saransk (loan)	2011–12	Russian First League	25	2	–		–		–		25	2
Tom Tomsk	2012–13	Russian First League	19	4	2	0	–		4 (Note: Appearances in the FNL Cup)	0	25	4
Ural Yekaterinburg	2013–14	Russian Premier League	14	0	1	0	–		–		15	0
Ural Yekaterinburg	2014–15	Russian Premier League	0	0	0	0	–		–		0	0
Ural Yekaterinburg	2015–16	Russian Premier League	0	0	0	0	–		–		0	0
Ural Yekaterinburg	Total		14	0	1	0	0	0	0	0	15	0
Tom Tomsk (loan)	2014–15	Russian First League	0	0	–		–		1	0	1	0
Arsenal Tula	2015–16	Russian First League	13	1	–		–		–		13	1
Arsenal Tula	2016–17	Russian Premier League	5	0	0	0	–		–		5	0
Arsenal Tula	Total		18	1	0	0	0	0	0	0	18	1
Taraz	2017	Kazakhstan Premier League	25	0	1	0	–		–		26	0
Rotor Volgograd	2017–18	Russian First League	6	1	–		–		4	0	10	1
Dolgoprudny	2018–19	Russian Second League	3	1	–		–		–		3	1
Dolgoprudny	2019–20	Russian Second League	17	5	1	0	–		–		18	5
Dolgoprudny	Total		20	6	1	0	0	0	0	0	21	6
Olimp-Dolgoprudny	2020–21	Russian Second League	21	4	2	1	–		–		23	5
Olimp-Dolgoprudny-2	2021–22	Russian Second League	23	3	–		–		–		23	3
Kosmos Dolgoprudny	2022–23	Russian Second League	1	0	–		–		–		1	0
Career total			280	32	17	3	2	0	11	0	310	35
