= César Navas =

Spanish footballer

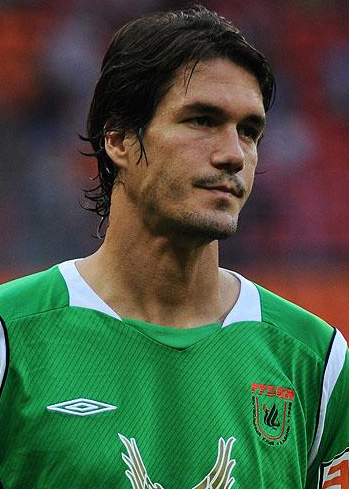
- Navas with Rubin Kazan in 2017

Personal information
- Full name: César González Navas
- Date of birth: 14 February 1980 (age 46)
- Place of birth: Móstoles, Spain
- Height: 1.94 m (6 ft 4 1/2 in)
- Position: Centre-back

Youth career
- Real Madrid

Senior career*
Years	Team	Apps	(Gls)
1999–2003	Real Madrid B	108	(2)
2003–2005	Málaga B	51	(1)
2004–2007	Málaga	63	(4)
2007	→ Gimnàstic (loan)	19	(2)
2007–2009	Racing Santander	38	(1)
2009–2015	Rubin Kazan	164	(3)
2015–2017	Rostov	52	(1)
2017–2018	Rubin Kazan	34	(0)
Total		529	(14)

International career
1997	Spain U17	6	(0)
1998–1999	Spain U18	5	(2)
- * Club domestic league appearances and goals

César González Navas (Spanish pronunciation: [ˈθesaɾ ˈnaβas]; born 14 February 1980) is a Spanish former professional footballer who played as a central defender.

In his country, he played for Málaga B, Málaga, Gimnàstic and Racing de Santander, amassing La Liga totals of 106 matches and six goals over five seasons. In 2009 he signed for Rubin Kazan, remaining in the Russian Premier League until his retirement.

== Club career ==
Born in Móstoles, Community of Madrid, Navas was brought through the ranks of hometown's Real Madrid, but only played with its B team. He made his La Liga debut in the 2004–05 season, going on to spend two years in the competition with Málaga CF; his first match was on 12 December 2004, as he featured the full 90 minutes in a 1–0 home win against Levante UD.

Navas left Málaga and the Segunda División in January 2007, joining top-flight strugglers (eventually relegated) Gimnàstic de Tarragona. After his return to Andalusia, he had a trial with English club Ipswich Town, but the deal fell through due to a metatarsal injury; he subsequently moved to Racing de Santander also in the top tier, signing for two years.

A habitual starter throughout the first half of the 2008–09 campaign, Navas was sold in late February 2009 to Russia's FC Rubin Kazan, on a three-year deal worth €2 million. He appeared in 28 games in his first year, as the team renewed their Russian Premier League supremacy.

On 12 July 2015, Navas signed a one-year contract with FC Rostov, agreeing to an extension one year later. In June 2017, he left the Olimp-2.

Navas returned to Rubin in August 2017. On 14 February 2019, the 39-year-old announced his retirement.

== Career statistics ==
Appearances and goals by club, season and competition
Club	Season	League			National Cup		Continental		Other		Total	
Club	Season	Division	Apps	Goals	Apps	Goals	Apps	Goals	Apps	Goals	Apps	Goals
Real Madrid B	1999–2000	Segunda División B	33	1	–		–		–		33	1
Real Madrid B	2000–01	Segunda División B	13	0	–		–		–		13	0
Real Madrid B	2001–02	Segunda División B	31	0	–		–		6	0	37	0
Real Madrid B	2002–03	Segunda División B	31	1	–		–		–		31	1
Real Madrid B	Total		108	2	–	–	–	–	6	0	114	2
Málaga B	2003–04	Segunda División	36	1	–		–		–		36	1
Málaga B	2004–05	Segunda División	15	0	–		–		–		15	0
Málaga B	Total		51	1	–	–	–	–	–	–	51	1
Málaga	2004–05	La Liga	21	1	2	0	–		–		23	1
Málaga	2005–06	La Liga	28	2	0	0	–		–		28	2
Málaga	2006–07	Segunda División	14	1	2	0	–		–		16	1
Málaga	Total		63	4	4	0	–	–	–	–	67	4
Gimnàstic (loan)	2006–07	La Liga	19	2	0	0	–		–		19	2
Racing Santander	2007–08	La Liga	19	0	3	0	–		–		22	0
Racing Santander	2008–09	La Liga	19	1	1	0	6	0	–		26	1
Racing Santander	Total		38	1	4	0	6	0	–	–	48	1
Rubin Kazan	2009	Russian Premier League	28	0	2	0	4	0	1	0	35	0
Rubin Kazan	2010	Russian Premier League	29	1	0	0	9	0	1	0	39	1
Rubin Kazan	2011–12	Russian Premier League	35	1	3	0	9	0	–		47	1
Rubin Kazan	2012–13	Russian Premier League	21	0	0	0	8	0	1	0	30	0
Rubin Kazan	2013–14	Russian Premier League	29	1	1	0	12	1	–		42	2
Rubin Kazan	2014–15	Russian Premier League	22	0	2	0	–		–		24	0
Rostov	2015–16	Russian Premier League	28	0	0	0	–		–		28	0
Rostov	2016–17	Russian Premier League	24	1	2	0	14	0	–		40	1
Rostov	Total		52	1	2	0	14	0	–	–	68	1
Rubin Kazan	2017–18	Russian Premier League	17	0	0	0	–		–		17	0
Rubin Kazan	Total (2 spells)		181	3	8	0	42	1	3	0	234	4
Career total			512	14	18	0	62	1	9	0	601	15

== Honours ==
Rubin Kazan

- Russian Premier League: 2009
- Russian Cup: 2011–12
- Russian Super Cup: 2010, 2012
