= Sergey Ryzhikov (footballer) =

Russian footballer

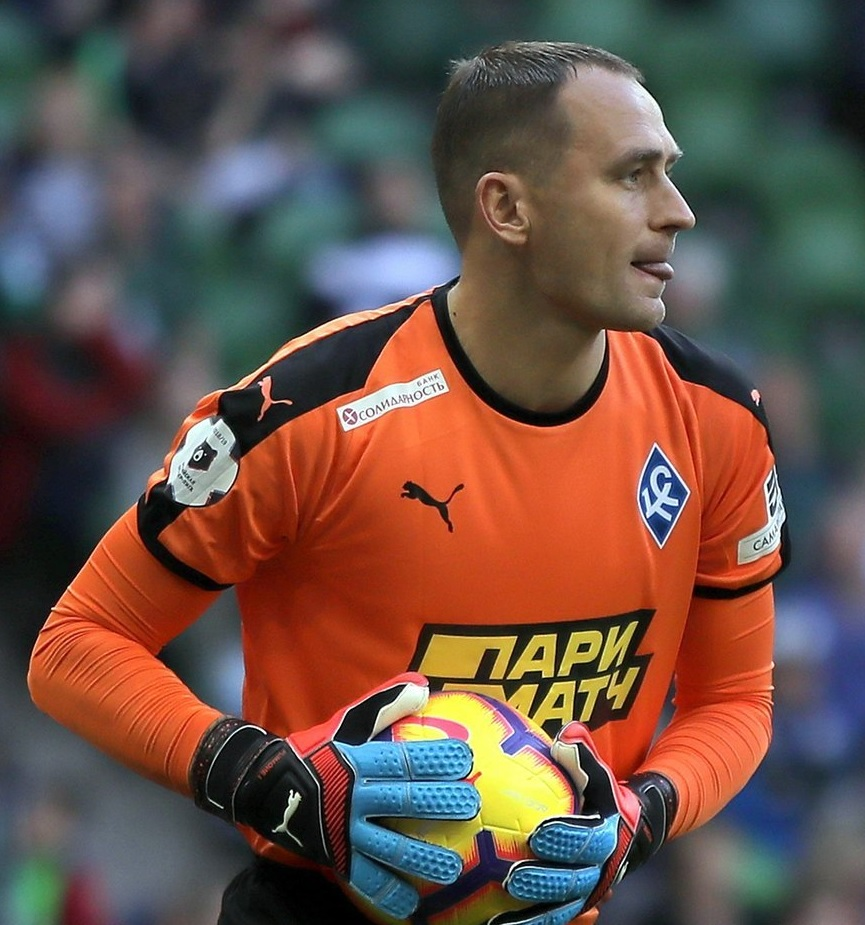
- Ryzhikov with Krylia Sovetov in 2019

Personal information
- Full name: Sergey Viktorovich Ryzhikov
- Date of birth: 19 September 1980 (age 46)
- Place of birth: Shebekino, Belgorod Oblast, Russian SFSR
- Height: 1.92 m (6 ft 4 in)
- Position: Goalkeeper

Team information
- Current team: Dynamo St. Petersburg (manager)

Senior career*
Years	Team	Apps	(Gls)
1999–2001	Salyut-Energiya Belgorod	19	(0)
2002–2004	Saturn Ramenskoye	3	(0)
2005	Anzhi Makhachkala	39	(0)
2006–2007	Lokomotiv Moscow	2	(0)
2007	→ Tom Tomsk (loan)	5	(0)
2008–2018	Rubin Kazan	281	(0)
2018–2020	Krylia Sovetov Samara	42	(0)
2020–2021	Tambov	20	(0)

International career
2011-2015	Russia	1	(0)

Managerial career
- 2022: Akhmat Grozny (assistant)
- 2022–2023: Spartak Tambov
- 2023–2024: Khimki (assistant)
- 2024: Sokol Kazan
- 2025–2026: Baltika Kaliningrad (analyst coach)
- 2026–: Dynamo St. Petersburg
- * Club domestic league appearances and goals

Sergey Viktorovich Ryzhikov (Russian: Сергей Викторович Рыжиков; born 19 September 1980) is a Russian football coach and a former goalkeeper who is the manager of Dynamo St. Petersburg.

== Club career ==
On 22 November 2007 it was announced Ryzhikov was moving to FC Rubin Kazan. He left Rubin after 10 seasons at the club on 15 May 2018, after losing his starting spot in the season to Soslan Dzhanayev.

On 1 August 2018, Ryzhikov signed a 2-year contract with PFC Krylia Sovetov Samara. After his contract with Krylia Sovetov expired, Ryzhikov signed a one-year contract with Tambov on 3 August 2020. On 9 March 2021, he left Tambov due to non-payment of wages.

=== Career statistics ===
As of 2 September 2018

Club	Season	League			Cup		Continental		Other		Total	
Club	Season	Division	Apps	Goals	Apps	Goals	Apps	Goals	Apps	Goals	Apps	Goals
FC Salyut-Energiya Belgorod	1999	Second Division	19	0	1	0	–		–		20	0
FC Salyut-Energiya Belgorod	2000	Amateur League	–		–		–		–		–	
FC Salyut-Energiya-2 Belgorod	2001	Amateur League	–		–		–		–		–	
FC Saturn Ramenskoye	2002	Russian Premier League	0	0	0	0	–		–		0	0
FC Saturn Ramenskoye	2003	Russian Premier League	0	0	0	0	–		–		0	0
FC Saturn Ramenskoye	2004	Russian Premier League	3	0	1	0	–		–		4	0
FC Saturn Ramenskoye	Total		3	0	1	0	0	0	0	0	4	0
FC Anzhi Makhachkala	2005	First Division	39	0	0	0	–		–		39	0
FC Lokomotiv Moscow	2006	Russian Premier League	2	0	0	0	–		–		2	0
FC Lokomotiv Moscow	2007	Russian Premier League	0	0	0	0	–		–		0	0
FC Lokomotiv Moscow	Total		2	0	0	0	0	0	0	0	2	0
FC Tom Tomsk	2007	Russian Premier League	5	0	0	0	–		–		5	0
FC Rubin Kazan	2008	Russian Premier League	26	0	1	0	–		–		27	0
FC Rubin Kazan	2009	Russian Premier League	29	0	3	0	6	0	1 (Note: One appearance in the Russian Super Cup)	0	39	0
FC Rubin Kazan	2010	Russian Premier League	28	0	0	0	10	0	1 (Note: One appearance in the Russian Super Cup)	0	39	0
FC Rubin Kazan	2011–12	Russian Premier League	41	0	5	0	12	0	–		58	0
FC Rubin Kazan	2012–13	Russian Premier League	29	0	1	0	11	0	1 (Note: One appearance in the Russian Super Cup)	0	42	0
FC Rubin Kazan	2013–14	Russian Premier League	29	0	0	0	10	0	–		39	0
FC Rubin Kazan	2014–15	Russian Premier League	27	0	3	0	–		–		30	0
FC Rubin Kazan	2015–16	Russian Premier League	30	0	0	0	10	0	–		40	0
FC Rubin Kazan	2016–17	Russian Premier League	29	0	2	0	–		–		31	0
FC Rubin Kazan	2017–18	Russian Premier League	13	0	1	0	–		–		14	0
FC Rubin Kazan	Total		281	0	16	0	59	0	3	0	359	0
PFC Krylia Sovetov Samara	2018–19	Russian Premier League	1	0	–		–		–		1	0
Career total			350	0	18	0	59	0	3	0	430	0

== International ==
He was called up for the national team for the first time in a match against Wales.

He made his national team debut on 29 March 2011 in a friendly against Qatar.

On 2 June 2014, he was included in the Russia's 2014 FIFA World Cup squad.

== Coaching career ==
On 30 September 2022, Ryzhikov was appointed manager of the Russian Second League club FC Spartak Tambov. Ryzhikov left Spartak Tambov on 26 August 2023.

== Honors ==
=== Club ===
- Russian Premier League winner
  - Russian Premier League 2008
  - Russian Premier League 2009
- Russian Super Cup winner
  - 2010 Russian Super Cup

=== Individual ===
- In the list of 33 best football players of the championship of Russia (3): No. 2 (2008, 2009, 2010).
- In September, 2008 has received a debut call in the first Russian national team

== Personal life ==
Ryzhikov is married, and has three children, a son and two daughters. His brother Andrei Ryzhikov is also a professional footballer.
