= 2010 in Russian football =

2010 season

The Russian Premier League schedule of competitions and cups from 2010.

== Club competitions ==
For more details, see:

- 2010 Russian Premier League
- 2010 Russian First Division
- 2010 Russian Second Division

== European club competitions ==
=== 2009–10 UEFA Champions League ===
CSKA Moscow took second place in the group stage and enters the knockout stage.

- February 24, 2010 / First knockout round, First Leg / CSKA Moscow - Sevilla 1-1 (González 66' - Negredo 25') / Moscow, Luzhniki Stadium / Attendance: 28,600

PFC CSKA Moscow: Akinfeev (captain), Šemberas, Ignashevich, A. Berezutskiy, González, Krasić, Honda (Mamaev, 83), Aldonin, V. Berezutskiy, Shchennikov, Necid.

- March 16, 2010 / First knockout round, Second Leg / Sevilla - CSKA Moscow / Seville, Estadio Ramón Sánchez Pizjuán / Attendance:

PFC CSKA Moscow:
