= Almaz Askarov (footballer) =

Russian footballer

Personal information
- Full name: Almaz Ilsurovich Askarov
- Date of birth: 21 January 1992 (age 34)
- Place of birth: Vyatskiye Polyany, Russia
- Height: 1.84 m (6 ft 0 in)
- Position: Midfielder

Senior career*
Years	Team	Apps	(Gls)
2009–2012	FC Rubin Kazan	0	(0)
2012–2015	FC Rubin-2 Kazan	66	(6)
2014–2015	FC Rubin Kazan	0	(0)
2015–2016	FC Gazovik Orenburg	2	(0)
- * Club domestic league appearances and goals

Almaz Ilsurovich Askarov (Russian: Алмаз Ильсурович Аскаров; born 21 January 1992) is a former Russian football midfielder.

== Club career ==
He made his debut in the Russian Second Division for FC Rubin-2 Kazan on 5 August 2012 in a game against FC Volga Ulyanovsk.

He made his Russian Football National League debut for FC Gazovik Orenburg on 20 March 2016 in a game against FC Torpedo Armavir.
