= Aleksandr Bukharov =

Russian footballer (born 1985)

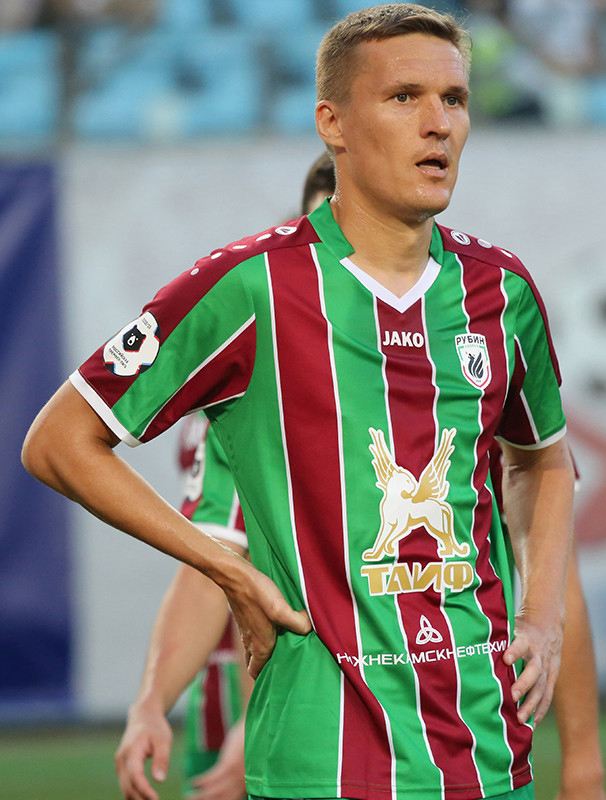
- Bukharov with Rubin Kazan in 2018

Personal information
- Full name: Aleksandr Evgenyevich Bukharov
- Date of birth: 12 March 1985 (age 41)
- Place of birth: Brezhnev, Soviet Union
- Height: 1.93 m (6 ft 4 in)
- Position: Striker

Youth career
- 1997–2000: KAMAZ Naberezhnye Chelny
- 2000–2002: Krasnodar-2000

Senior career*
Years	Team	Apps	(Gls)
2002	Krasnodar-2000	1	(0)
2003	Chernomorets Novorossiysk	0	(0)
2004	Rubin-2 Kazan	31	(11)
2005–2010	Rubin Kazan	71	(33)
2010–2014	Zenit Saint Petersburg	54	(11)
2014	→ Anzhi Makhachkala (loan)	10	(2)
2014–2018	Rostov	82	(15)
2018–2019	Rubin Kazan	21	(0)

International career
2005	Russia U-21	2	(0)
2011	Russia-2	1	(0)
2009–2017	Russia	9	(1)
- * Club domestic league appearances and goals

Aleksandr Yevgenyevich Bukharov (Russian: Александр Евгеньевич Бухаров; born 12 March 1985) is a Russian former professional footballer who played as a striker.

== Club career ==
With Rubin Kazan Bukharov won the Russian Premier League 2008. At that season he broke the record for the fastest goal in the Russian Premier League, scoring after 26 seconds. On 19 July 2010, he signed four-year contract with Zenit Saint Petersburg.

On 22 February 2018, he was released from his Rostov contract by mutual consent.

On 25 July 2018, he returned to Rubin Kazan, signing a one-year contract. He left Rubin upon the expiration of his contract on 17 June 2019.

== International career ==
Bukharov made his debut for the Russia national team in October 2009 in a 2010 FIFA World Cup qualifier against Azerbaijan. After six years without call-ups, he returned to the national team for two friendly games in March 2017.

== Career statistics ==
=== Club ===
Club	Season	League			Cup		Continental		Other		Total	
Club	Season	Division	Apps	Goals	Apps	Goals	Apps	Goals	Apps	Goals	Apps	Goals
Krasnodar-2000	2002	Russian Second League	1	0	–		–		–		1	0
Chernomorets Novorossiysk	2003	Russian Premier League	0	0	0	0	–		–		0	0
Rubin-2 Kazan	2004	Russian Second League	31	11	3	1	–		–		34	12
Rubin Kazan	2005	Russian Premier League	8	2	1	0	–		–		9	2
Rubin Kazan	2006	Russian Premier League	8	5	5	1	–		–		13	6
Rubin Kazan	2007	Russian Premier League	0	0	0	0	0	0	–		0	0
Rubin Kazan	2008	Russian Premier League	20	6	0	0	–		–		20	6
Rubin Kazan	2009	Russian Premier League	23	16	2	0	4 (Note: Appearances in the UEFA Champions League)	0	0	0	29	16
Rubin Kazan	2010	Russian Premier League	12	4	–		4 (Note: Appearances in the UEFA Europa League)	2	1 (Note: Appearances in the Russian Super Cup)	1	17	7
Rubin Kazan	Total		71	33	8	1	8	2	1	1	88	37
Zenit St. Petersburg	2010	Russian Premier League	10	4	0	0	7 (Note: Two appearances in the UEFA Champions League, five appearances, three goals in the UEFA Europa League)	3	–		17	7
Zenit St. Petersburg	2011–12	Russian Premier League	31	6	4	2	6 (Note: Five appearances in the UEFA Champions League, one appearance in the UEFA Europa League)	0	0	0	41	8
Zenit St. Petersburg	2012–13	Russian Premier League	9	1	3	0	2 (Note: One appearance in the UEFA Champions League, one appearance in the UEFA Europa League)	0	1	0	15	1
Zenit St. Petersburg	2013–14	Russian Premier League	4	0	1	0	2	1	1	0	8	1
Zenit St. Petersburg	Total		54	11	8	2	17	4	2	0	81	17
Anzhi Makhachkala (loan)	2013–14	Russian Premier League	10	2	–		4	0	–		14	2
Rostov	2014–15	Russian Premier League	26	4	1	0	2	0	3 (Note: One appearance in Russian Super Cup, two appearances, one goal in the relegation play-offs)	1	32	5
Rostov	2015–16	Russian Premier League	25	3	0	0	–		–		25	3
Rostov	2016–17	Russian Premier League	18	6	0	0	9 (Note: Five appearance in the UEFA Champions League, four appearances, one goal in the UEFA Europa League)	1	–		27	7
Rostov	2017–18	Russian Premier League	13	2	2	1	–		–		15	3
Rostov	Total		82	15	3	1	11	1	3	1	99	18
Rubin Kazan	2018–19	Russian Premier League	21	0	1	0	–		–		22	0
Career total			270	72	23	5	40	7	6	2	339	86

=== International ===
Scores and results list Russia's goal tally first.

No	Date	Venue	Opponent	Score	Result	Competition
1.	28 March 2017	Fisht Olympic Stadium, Sochi, Russia	Belgium	3–3	3–3	Friendly
