= Tikhonov =

Tikhonov (Russian: Ти́хонов; masculine) and Tikhonova (Ти́хонова; feminine) are Russian surnames derived from the male given name Tikhon, the Russian form of the Greek name Τύχων (Latin form: Tycho), and literally means 'Tikhon's'. Notable people with the name include:

== People with the surname Tikhonov ==
- Alexander Tikhonov (disambiguation) or variants, several people
- Alexei Tikhonov (born 1971), Russian figure skater
- Andrey Tikhonov (disambiguation), several people, including:
  - Andrey Tikhonov (mathematician) (1906–1993), Soviet Russian mathematician and geophysicist
    - Tikhonov distribution
    - Tikhonov's theorem (dynamical systems)
    - Tikhonov regularization
    - Tychonoff space
    - Tychonoff's theorem
    - Tychonoff separation axioms
- Dmitry Tikhonov (born 1988), Russian footballer
- Gleb Tikhonov (born 1992), Russian-Finnish orienteer
- Igor Tikhonov (born 1969), Russian footballer and coach
- Ivan Tikhonov (born 1996), Russian-born Azerbaijani gymnast
- Kirill Tikhonov (1921–1998), Russian conductor
- Konstantin Tikhonov, Soviet army officer and Hero of the Soviet Union
- Mikhail Tikhonov (1900–1971), Soviet soldier and Hero of the Soviet Union
- Mikhail Yuryevich Tikhonov (born 1981), Russian actor
- Nikita Tikhonov, suspect in the 2009 Stanislav Markelov murder case
- Nikolai Tikhonov (1905–1997), Soviet Russian-Ukrainian statesman
- Nikolai Tikhonov (cosmonaut) (born 1982), Russian cosmonaut
- Nikolai Tikhonov (writer) (1896–1979), Russian writer
- Vasily Tikhonov (disambiguation), several people
- Viktor Tikhonov (disambiguation), several people
- Vitali Tikhonov (born 1984), Russian footballer
- Vladimir Tikhonov (born 1947), Russian politician
- Vladimir Tikhonov (gymnast) (born 1956), Soviet Olympic gymnast
- Vyacheslav Tikhonov (1928–2009), Soviet actor

== People with the surname Tikhonova ==
- Anastasia Tikhonova (born 2001), Russian tennis player
- Katerina Tikhonova (born 1986), Russian scientist and manager, Putin's daughter
- Nina Tikhonova (1910–1995), Russian ballet dancer and dance teacher
- Sofia Tikhonova (born 1998), Russian ski jumper
- Tamara Tikhonova (born 1964), Soviet Russian cross-country skier
