= Tico (disambiguation) =

Ticos is a colloquial name for the natives of Costa Rica.

Tico, TICO or Ticos may also refer to:

== People ==
- Nicolae Tico (born 1953), Romanian sprint canoer
- Tico (footballer, born 1964), Admílson Oliveira da Silva, Brazilian footballer
- Tico (footballer, born 1971), Paulo Rogério Alves, Brazilian footballer
- Tico (footballer, born 1976), Emerson Henrique Alves, Brazilian footballer
- Tico (footballer, born 1977), Alex Chandre de Oliveira (1977-2014), Brazilian footballer
- Tico (footballer, born 2006), Paulo Sérgio da Costa Evangelista Júnior, Brazilian football winger
- Onyekachi Okonkwo (born 1982), Nigerian footballer known as Tico
- Tico Brown (born 1957), American former professional basketball player, nicknamed "Tico"
- Tico Mineiro (born 1976), Dilmar dos Santos Machado, Brazilian footballer
- Tico McNutt, American animal research and founder of the Wild Dog Research Project, nicknamed "Tico"
- Hector Perez, American attorney and 9th national commissioner of the Boy Scouts of America (2008–2016), nicknamed "Tico"
- Tico Santa Cruz, stage name of Luis Guilherme Brunetta Fontenelle de Araújo (born 1977), frontman of Brazilian rock band Detonautas Roque Clube
- Tico Torres, (born 1953), American drummer and percussionist for Bon Jovi
- Tico Wells, African-American actor
- Tico Zamora (born 1967), American rock musician, songwriter and record producer

== Fictional characters ==
- Rose Tico, in Star Wars: The Last Jedi
- Tico the Squirrel, on the children's television series Dora the Explorer
- title orca character of Tico of the Seven Seas, a Japanese anime series
- Tico, in the Spanish animated series Around the World with Willy Fog

== Other uses ==
- Daewoo Tico, a compact Korean car
- Tico Records, a record label
- Tico Sportswear, a Polish sportswear company
- Ticos Air, a planned Costa Rican airline which never commenced operations
- Los Ticos, a nickname for the Costa Rica national football team
- Hurricane Tico, which struck Mazatlán, Mexico, in 1983
- Tico (greyhound), a famous racing greyhound
- Tico salamander, a species native to Costa Rica
- Ticonderoga-class cruiser, a United States Navy class of guided-missile cruisers
  - USS Ticonderoga (CG-47) (nicknamed "Tico"), lead ship of the class
- Ticoş, a village in Romania
- Ticoș River, Romania
- Tico and the Triumphs, a band in which Paul Simon performed in his early career
- Training Institute of Central Ohio, a former youth prison in Columbus, Ohio
- Travel Industry Council of Ontario, Canadian non-profit
- TICO (codec) or Tiny IntoPIX Codec, a codec
- Tico Robot, a robot
- Space Coast Regional Airport formerly and still colloquially known as Tico or Ti-Co (Titusville-Cocoa Airport)

== See also ==
- Tico-Tico (born 1973), Mozambican footballer
- TECO (disambiguation)
- Tyco (disambiguation)
- Tycho (disambiguation)
