= Tychonoff's theorem (disambiguation) =

Tikhonov's theorem or Tychonoff's theorem may refer to any of several mathematical theorems named after the Russian mathematician Andrey Tikhonov:

- Tychonoff's theorem, the product of any collection of compact topological spaces is compact
- Tikhonov's fixed point theorem, concerning fixed points of continuous mappings on compact subsets of certain topological vector spaces
- Tikhonov's theorem (dynamical systems), concerning limiting behaviour of solutions of systems of differential equations applicable to (among other things) chemistry

== See also ==
- Andrey Tikhonov (mathematician)
- Tikhonov distribution
- Tikhonov regularization
- Tychonoff space
