= Sergei Ipatov =

Soviet, Russian and American scientist

Sergei Ivanovich Ipatov
- Сергей Иванович Ипатов
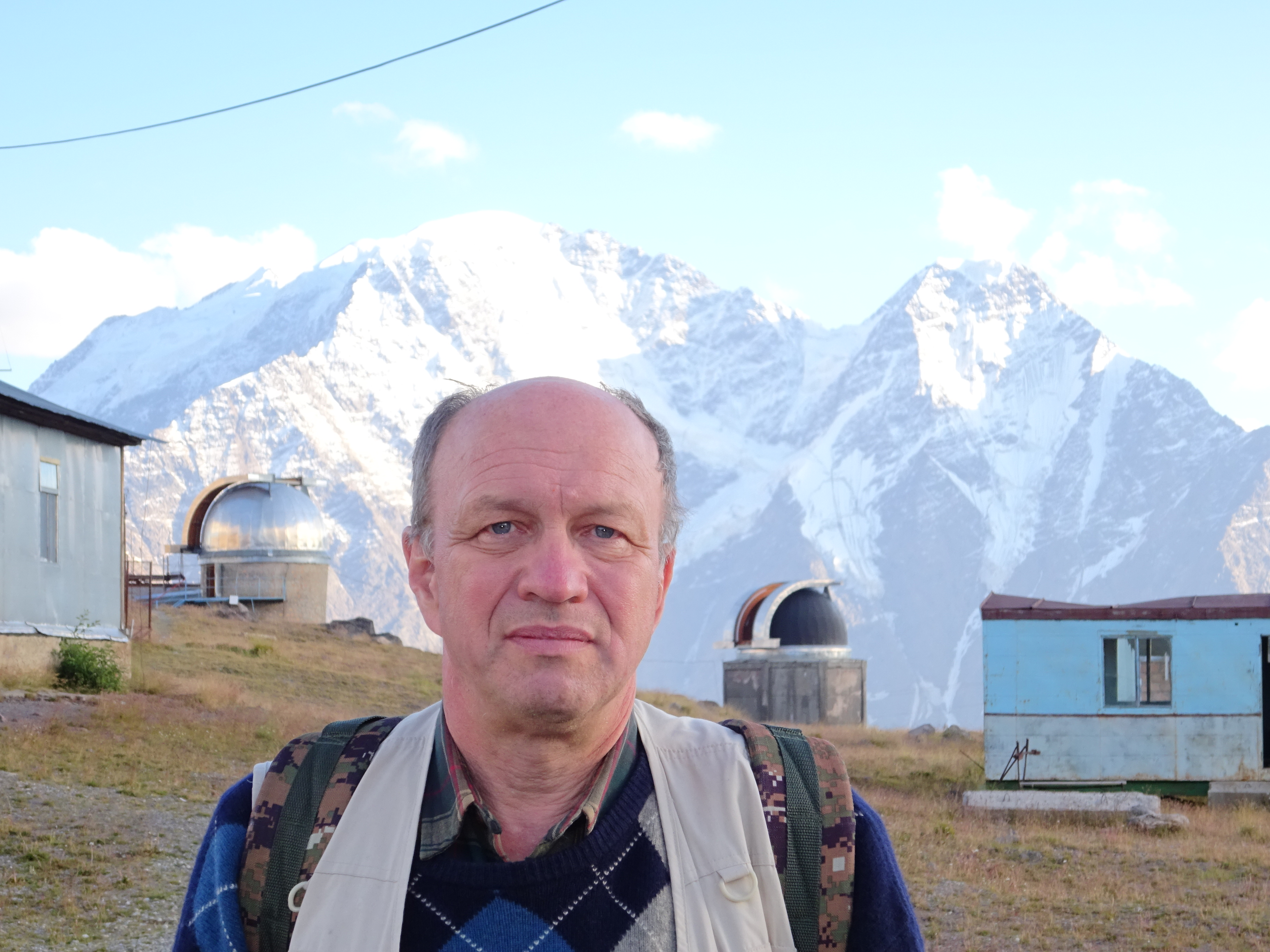
- Ipatov in September 2015
- Born: November 10, 1952 (age 74); Moscow
- Education: Moscow State University (1975)
- Awards: Russian Academy of Sciences F. A. Bredikhin Prize in astronomy
- Scientific career
- Fields: astronomy
- Website: Sites.google.com/view/siipatov/home

Sergei Ivanovich Ipatov (Russian: Сергей Иванович Ипатов, born November 10, 1952, Moscow) is a Soviet, Russian, and American scientist, laureate of the F. A. Bredikhin Prize in astronomy of the Russian Academy of Sciences, Doctor of Physical and Mathematical Sciences. Asteroid 14360 Ipatov was named in his honor.

== Early life ==
Sergei Ivanovich Ipatov was born in Moscow, Soviet Union, on November 10, 1952. His parents were Ivan Iosifovich Ipatov (1927-2015), a сolonel, Ph.D., who was thedeputy head of a department in the V.V. Kuibyshev military academy and Alexandra Ivanovna Ipatova née Ropakova (1927-2010), a teacher of mathematics. His brother (Andrey Ivanovich Ipatov) is a professor, doctor of technical sciences. The wife of Sergei, Valentina Ivanovna Ipatova (Artioukhova), is a senior scientist, PhD, at the Lomonosov Moscow State University.

In 1975, he graduated from the Faculty of Mechanics and Mathematics of the Lomonosov Moscow State University.

== Career ==
Between 1975 and 2003, Ipatov worked at the M.V. Keldysh Institute of Applied Mathematics of the Russian Academy of Sciences (in the sector of RAS Academician T.M. Eneev at the department of Academician D.E. Okhotsimsky). In 1982 he became a candidate of physical and mathematical sciences (PhD), and in 1997 – a doctor of physical and mathematical sciences. In 2001–2010 he worked at several scientific institutions in the United States: at the NASA's Goddard Space Flight Center (MD, USA), the University of Maryland (College Park, MD, USA), the Department of Terrestrial Magnetism of the Carnegie Institution for Science (now Earth and Planets Laboratory of Carnegie Science) (Washington, DC, US), the George Mason University (VA, US), and the Catholic University of America (Washington, DC, US). In 2011–2013 he worked in Qatar (Alsubai Establishment for Scientific Studies, Doha, Qatar). Since December 2013, he has been a lead scientist at the V.I. Vernadsky Institute of Geochemistry and Analytical Chemistry of Russian Academy of Sciences.

In 1990s Ipatov made several scientific visits (with duration from a month to six months) to Belgium, Germany, and the United States. In 1998 he delivered lectures at the astronomy department of the Faculty of Physics of Moscow State University. He worked part time at the Gubkin Russian State University of Oil and Gas (National Research University, Moscow, 2001–2002) and at the Space Research Institute of the Russian Academy of Sciences (Moscow, 2011–2017).

He is an author of about 80 papers in peer-reviewed scientific journals, about 120 papers in conference proceedings and books, and more than 300 conference abstracts. He published four books in Russian: "Migration of Celestial Bodies in the Solar System", "Several notes about history of the USSR and Russia", "Formation and evolution of planetary systems" (the book contains 537 references, mainly in English, to publications by S.I. Ipatov), "My meetings with astronomers and other people" (the book contains more than a thousand photos of scientists, including foreign scientists). The last two books contain a lot of text in English. Ipatov is a member of the editorial board of the scientific journal Solar System Research (since 2003), academician of the Russian Academy of Natural Sciences (section of physics, since 2000), a member of the Eurasian Astronomical Society (since 1995), European Astronomical Society (since 1995), American Astronomical Society (since 2002), International Astronomical Union (since 2003), American Geophysical Union (since 2006).

== Main scientific interests and achievements ==
Ipatov studied migration of bodies and planets in the forming Solar System and formation of planets and exoplanets. The studies were based on computer simulations of the evolution of disks of gravitating bodies combined at collisions. In particular, in 1991, before the Nice model, he published for the first time that if the embryos of Uranus and Neptune were originally near the orbit of Saturn, then they could increase the semi-major axes of their orbits to their present values as a result of gravitational interactions with migrated planetesimals. The total mass of planetesimals ejected into hyperbolic orbits was several times higher than the mass of planetesimals that collided with forming giant planets The inner layers of every terrestrial planet can be accumulated mainly from material from the vicinity of this planet. The outer layers of the Earth and Venus could accumulate similar material from the feeding zone of the terrestrial planets. The Earth and Venus could accumulate most of the planetesimals from the zone at a distance of 0.7–1.1 AU from the Sun in less than 5 million years. The formation of satellite systems of small bodies and the Earth-Moon system was studied for the model for which embryos of these celestial objects were formed as a result of the compression of a rarefied condensation formed as a result of the collision of two condensations at which it acquired the angular momentum needed for formation of a satellite system. The Moon embryo that formed as a result of compression of the condensation grew later mainly by accumulation of the material ejected from the Earth's embryo at its collisions with planetesimals.

Ipatov made computer simulations of migration of small bodies (asteroids, comets, trans-Neptunian objects, planetesimals, and bodies ejected from the terrestrial planets and the Moon). For example, in 1989, he showed for the first time that for the 5:2 resonance with Jupiter, the range of initial values of semi-major axes, eccentricities, and orbital inclinations at which test asteroids begin to cross the orbit of Mars in time of no more than 100 thousand years is close to the zone avoided by real asteroids. A small fraction of Jupiter-crossing objects can reach typical near-Earth objects' orbits and move in such orbits for millions of years. Although the fraction of such objects did not exceed a percent of the original objects, the contribution of such an object to the probability of collisions with the Earth could be greater than that of hundreds or even thousands of other objects with close initial orbits. Calculations showed that the amount of matter delivered to the Earth from beyond Jupiter's orbit could exceed the mass of the Earth's oceans if the mass of bodies in the feeding area of the giant planets was about 200 Earth's masses. The ratio of the mass of matter delivered from this region to a planet to the mass of the planet for Mars was about twice that for the Earth, and such ratios for Mercury and Venus were slightly larger than for the Earth. Bodies migrated from the zone of the outer asteroid belt could also deliver a considerable amount of water to the Earth and could be one of the sources of the late-heavy bombardment. Some papers on migration of small bodies were published in collaboration with Academician M.Ya. Marov. Based on the studies of lunar craters and the probabilities of collisions of near-Earth objects with the Earth, together with E.A. Feoktistova and V.V. Svetsov, he estimated the variations in the number of near-Earth objects over the last billion years, and also studied the depths of lunar craters in the region of the seas and continents.

Together with John Mather, Ipatov numerically studied the migration of dust particles with initial velocities and positions the same as those of asteroids, trans-Neptunian objects and comets. The probabilities of collisions of dust particles of various masses with planets were calculated. Based on the results of studies of the migration of dust particles and observational data (for example, the spectra of dust particles of the zodiacal cloud), the fractions of the zodiacal dust produced by asteroids and comets, as well as the typical eccentricities of the zodiacal dust particles, were estimated. In particular, it was concluded that cometary dust particles can play a dominant role in the zodiacal cloud. Migration of dust ejected from the terrestrial planets was also studied.

In 2005-2006, Ipatov was a member of the Deep Impact team led by Michael A'Hearn. For the first time in history, the NASA spacecraft dropped a probe on a comet, which rammed its surface, having previously photographed it at close range. He was engaged in the automatic recognition and removal of cosmic ray traces from images taken by this spacecraft. Analyzing images of a cloud of matter ejected after the collision of the spacecraft's impact module with comet 9P/Tempel 1, he concluded that at a depth of several meters below the surface of comets there may be many cavities with dust and gas under pressure.

Together with Alan Boss, Ipatov simulated triggered collapse of the presolar dense cloud core and injection of short-lived radioisotopes by a supernova shock wave. For these simulations they applied the FLASH adaptive mesh refinement hydrodynamics code. In collaboration with James Cho, he studied (for example, using the SBDART program) the transfer of radiation in the atmospheres of test extrasolar planets.

Together with Eric Elst and Thierry Pauwels, Ipatov observed asteroids and comets using the 0.85-meter Schmidt telescope at the Royal Observatory of Belgium and was the co-discoverer of eight asteroids that got numbers.

Together with Keith Horne, he compared the exoplanet detection capability of microlensing observations for several telescopes and several models of a choice of microlensing events selected for observations. While constructing algorithm for such comparison, he analyzed models of sky brightness and seeing for considered telescopes. The algorithm also suggests the optimal sequence of observations of microlensing events.

The migration of planetesimals in the planetary systems of Proxima Centauri, TRAPPIST-1 and Gliese 581 was studied. In particular, it was found that the mass of water delivered to the potentially habitable inner planet Proxima Centauri b from the feeding zone of Proxima Centauri c, located beyond the ice line, could exceed the mass of Earth's oceans. The sizes of the feeding zone of Proxima Centauri c, stable orbits within this feeding zone, and the motion of planetesimals in the Hill sphere of Proxima Centauri were calculated. It was noted that this star should not have as massive an Oort cloud analogue as our Solar System. Estimates were made of the growth of exoplanets through planetesimals initially located at different distances from the star in the TRAPPIST-1 and Gliese 581 systems. Ipatov also studied non-astronomical problems, e.g., the channel routing for two-layer microchips. He was responsible for mathematical modeling for a grant from the oilfield services company Schlumberger "Studies of the generation of acoustic waves under the influence of fluids on pore walls and their propagation in a porous medium with fluids and gases."

== Awards and honors ==
Asteroid 14360 discovered by Eric W. Elst was named "Ipatov". In 2005 the International Astronomical Union (IAU) approved this name (14360 Ipatov) with the following justification: Sergej Ivanovich Ipatov (born 1952) is a Russian scientist and specialist in the migration of minor planets. During his stay in 1999 at the Uccle Observatory, he was shown to be a very fine observer who made several discoveries with the Uccle Schmidt telescope.

In 2019, Ipatov was awarded with the F. A. Bredikhin Prize in astronomy of the Russian Academy of Sciences for the cycle of works "Formation and evolution of the Solar System". Scientists are awarded with this prize once in 3 years.
