= Sergei Kurdyumov =

Russian physicist (1928–2004)

- Сергей Курдюмов
- Born: 18 November 1928; Moscow, RSFSR
- Died: 2 December 2004 (aged 76); Moscow, Russia
- Resting place: Troyekurovskoye Cemetery
- Education: Moscow State University
- Occupations: Soviet and Russian scientist
- Employer(s): Keldysh Institute of Applied Mathematics; Moscow Institute of Physics and Technology
- Scientific career
- Fields: Mathematical physics
- Academic advisors: Mstislav Keldysh
- Notable students: Vasily Sarychev

Sergey Pavlovich Kurdyumov (Russian: Серге́й Па́влович Курдю́мов; November 18, 1928 – December 2, 2004) was a specialist in mathematical physics, mathematical modeling, plasma physics, complexity studies and synergetics from Moscow, Russia.

Kurdyumov graduated from the Moscow State University in 1957. Since 1953 he worked in the Keldysh Institute of Applied Mathematics. He was also the Head of the Applied Mathematics Department in the Moscow Institute of Physics and Technology. Since 1984 he was a corresponding member of the Soviet Academy of Sciences and following the dissolution of the Soviet Union, Russian Academy of Sciences.

He was the author and co-author of more than 300 scientific works published in Russia and abroad, including about ten monographs. In 1969, he was the co-author of the scientific discovery of a new physical effect, "Effect of T-layer".

Theoretical works in the field of nuclear power engineering, laser thermonuclear fusion, laser thermochemistry were carried out by him in person and under his direction. Methods of exploration of laser thermonuclear targets by means of computational experiments were elaborated by Kurdyumov (together with academician RAS Alexander Samarskii. These methods laid the foundation for the conception of low-entropic compression of shell targets and substantiated this conception which is generally accepted nowadays all over the world.

Kurdyumov made an important contribution to the elaboration of fundamental problems of synergetics as well as to the theory of non-linear evolutionary equations. For quasi-linear equations of heat conductivity with a source, a theory of blow-up regimes was developed by Kurdyumov and his disciples. A spectrum of eigenfunctions of an open non-linear medium was studied, properties of diffusive chaos were investigated. The theory of blow-up regimes was extended to compressible media and the problems of dissipative and magnetic hydrodynamics. These results found an important application and experimental confirmation in the problems connected with laser thermonuclear fusion, in experiments on thermochemistry. From 1983 to 2004 under the direction of the Corresponding Member of the RAS Kurdyumov, and with his immediate assistance, a number of fundamental scientific results in the field of mathematical physics, nonlinear dynamics and synergetics were obtained. New methods of constructive analysis of solutions of a wide class of non-linear parabolic equations with sources and sinks were developed.

The research results in the field were presented, in particular, in the monograph entitled "Blow-up in quasi-linear parabolic equations", Berlin: Walter de Gruyter, 1995 (in co-authorship with A. A. Samarskii, V. A. Galaktionov, A.P. Mikhailov) which has obtained worldwide recognition. A series of pioneer works connected with analysis of diffusive chaos and with complex order in systems reaction–diffusion was accomplished; the works exert a great influence upon the development of studies in non-linear dynamics in Russia. The monograph "Non-stationary Structures and Diffusion Chaos", Moscow: Nauka Publishers, 1992, written in co-authorship with A.A. Samarskii, T.S. Achromeeva, G.G. Malinetskii is focused on these research results. Special attention is drawn to the application of the ideas of synergetics in such fields as strategic planning, analysis of the historical processes, the modelling of educational systems, the philosophical problems of natural sciences. Books devoted to these problems, especially, “Laws of Evolution and Self-organization of Complex Systems”, Moscow: Nauka Publishers, 1994, (in co-authorship with Helena N. Knyazeva), “Synergetics and Forecast of the Future”, Moscow: Nauka Publishers, 1997, (together with S.P. Kapitza and G.G. Malinetskii), “Foundations of Synergetics: Blow-up Regimes, Self-organization, Tempo-worlds”, Saint-Petersburg: Aletheia, 2002, (together with Helena N. Knyazeva), "Synergetics: Non-linearity of Time and Landscapes of Co-evolution", Moscow: KomKniga/URSS, 2007 (together with Helena N. Knyazeva), the collection of works of S.P. Kurdyumov and his disciples “The Blow-up Regimes. Evolution of the Idea. Laws of Co-evolution of Complex Systems”, Moscow: Nauka Publishers, 1999, are of great interest for the scientific community.

Kurdyumov was a great organizer of science in Russia. From 1989 to 1999, he was Director of the Keldysh Institute of Applied Mathematics of the RAS. Kurdyumov was Member of the Bureau of the Department of Computer Science, Computer Techniques and Automation. For many years, he was President of the International Computer Club, Vice-president of the National Committee on Mathematical Modelling. He was a Full Member of the European Academy of Sciences. Kurdyumov was a member of the editorial boards of five Russian and international scientific journals.

He created a whole scientific school in nonlinear dynamics and synergetics in Russia. Ten theses for a Doctor's degree (Habilitation) and nineteen Ph.D. theses were upheld under his supervision. Kurdyumov was honoured for his prominent achievements with governmental awards. Among his awards were the Medal "For Labour Valour" (1956), the Medal "For Distinguished Labour" (1970), the Order of the Badge of Honour (1975) and "Order of Honour" (1999).
