= List of Red Digital Cinema cameras =

The following provides a full list of cameras and notable accessories manufactured under the Red Digital Cinema Company brand.

== Cameras ==
Some models have different body variants: Aluminum Alloy, Forged or Woven Carbon Fiber and Magnesium and some have a custom-colored limited editions.

=== Red One (introduced in 2007-2009) ===
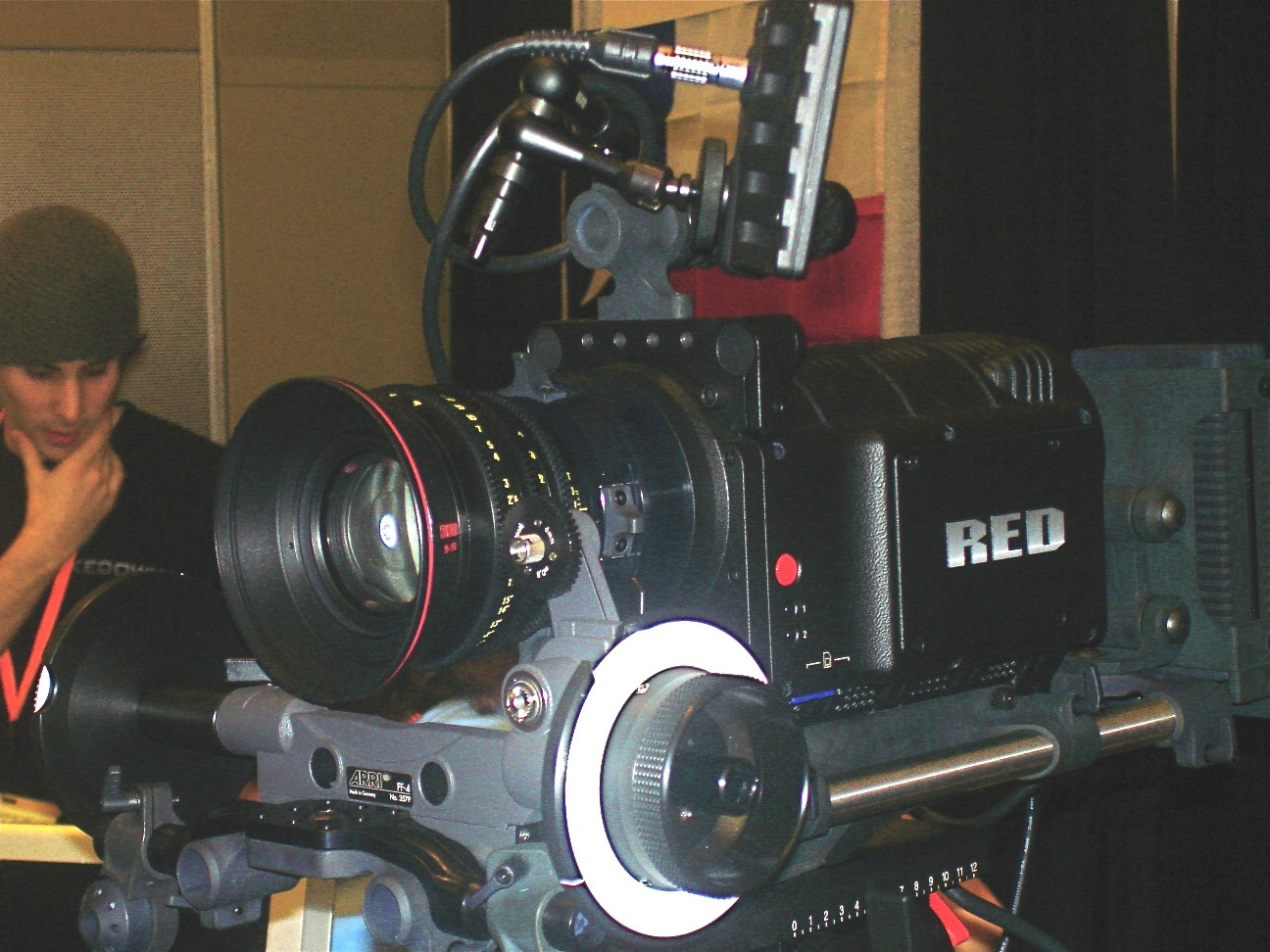
The Red One in a simple setup

The Red One was Red Digital Cinema’s first production camera. Using a S35mm image plane, the Red One displays a natural depth of field from 2K to over 4K resolutions.

The first Red Ones were outfitted with the 12 megapixel Mysterium sensor, capable of capturing up to 120 frames per second at 2K resolution and 30 frames per second at 4K resolution. The only possible acquisition format is Redcode Raw. The cameras were initially sold with a CF card slot that later could be replaced with a RedMag module. The second generation, Red One Mysterium-X has a 14 megapixel Mysterium-X sensor. It captures up to 120 frames per second at 2K resolution and up to 30 frames per second at 4K resolution. With the upgraded sensor, the Red One Mysterium-X offers more dynamic range, higher sensitivity and enhanced color management tools than the Red One Mysterium.

Model	Intro Yr	Sensor	Active Pixel Area	Max res at 24fps	Acquisition format	Max Apple ProRes/Avid DNx resolution	Active Imaging Area (mm)	Active Imaging Area (diagonal, mm)	Media	Dimensions (WxHxD, mm)	Weight (g) including Media Bay
Red One 4K	2007	Mysterium 4K	4480 x 2304	4K	.r3d	N/A	24.2 mm x 12.5 mm	27.3 mm	CF	148 x 97 x 57	4540 g;
Red One M-X 4K	2009	Mysterium-X 4K	4480 x 2304	4K	.r3d	N/A	24.2 mm x 12.5 mm	27.3 mm	CF + RedMag	148 x 97 x 57	4540 g;

=== DSMC (introduced in 2011-2013) ===
DSMC cameras are modular and can be customized in various configurations. Several lens mounts can be attached to the camera. The only possible acquisition format is Redcode Raw. Introduction of RedMag SSDs, later Red Mini-Mags. Touchscreen introduction.

Scarlet M-X shoots regular speeds of up to 30fps at 4K and up to 120 fps at 2k. At 5K, it can't exceed 18fps.

Model	Intro Yr	Sensor	Active Pixel Area	Max res at 24fps	Acquisition format	Max Apple ProRes/Avid DNx resolution	Active Imaging Area (mm)	Active Imaging Area (diagonal, mm)	Media	Dimensions (WxHxD, mm)	Weight (g) including Media Bay
Scarlet M-X 5K	2011	Mysterium-X 5K	5120 x 2700	4K	.r3d	N/A	27.7 mm x 14.6 mm	31.4 mm	RedMag/Red Mini-Mag	148 x 97 x 57	2195 g;
Scarlet Dragon 6K	2013	Dragon 6K	6144 x 3160	5K	.r3d	N/A	30.7 mm x 15.8 mm	34.5 mm	RedMag/Red Mini-Mag	148 x 97 x 57	2195 g;
Epic M-X 5K	2011	Mysterium-X 5K	5120 x 2700	5K	.r3d	N/A	27.7 mm x 14.6 mm	31.4 mm	RedMag/Red Mini-Mag	148 x 97 x 57	2195 g;
Epic M-X 5K Monochrome	2011	Mysterium-X 5K Monochrome	5120 x 2700	5K	.r3d	N/A	27.7 mm x 14.6 mm	31.4 mm	RedMag/Red Mini-Mag	148 x 97 x 57	2195 g;
Epic Dragon 6K	2012	Dragon 6K	6144 x 3160	6K	.r3d	N/A	30.7 mm x 15.8 mm	34.5 mm	RedMag/Red Mini-Mag	148 x 97 x 57	2195 g;
Epic Dragon 6K Monochrome	2012	Dragon 6K Monochrome	6144 x 3160	6K	.r3d	N/A	30.7 mm x 15.8 mm	34.5 mm	RedMag/Red Mini-Mag	148 x 97 x 57	2195 g;
Epic Dragon 6K CF	2013	Dragon 6K	6144 x 3160	6K	.r3d	N/A	30.7 mm x 15.8 mm	34.5 mm	RedMag/Red Mini-Mag	148 x 97 x 57	1750 g;

=== DSMC2 (introduced in 2015-2018) ===
DSMC2 cameras are modular and can be customised in various configurations. Several lens mounts can be attached to the camera. Differences to the former DSMC line are reduced size and weight, cable-less connections, as well as the addition of Apple ProRes and Avid DNx.

Model	Intro Yr	Sensor	Active Pixel Area	Max res at 24fps	Acquisition format	Max Apple ProRes/Avid DNx resolution	Active Imaging Area (mm)	Active Imaging Area (diagonal, mm)	Media	Dimensions (WxHxD, mm)	Weight (g) including Media Bay
Red Raven 4.5K	2015	Dragon 4.5K	4608 × 2160	4.6K	.r3d + ProRes/Avid DNx	2K	23.04 mm x 10.80 mm	25.5 mm	Red Mini-Mag	125.5 x 143.85 x 103.2	1588 g;
Scarlet-W Dragon 5K	2015	Dragon 5K	5120 × 2700	5K	.r3d + ProRes/Avid DNx	4K	25.60 mm x 13.50 mm	28.9 mm	Red Mini-Mag	125.5 x 143.85 x 102	1588 g;
Scarlet-W Dragon 5K Monochrome	2015	Dragon 5K Monochrome	5120 × 2700	5K	.r3d + ProRes/Avid DNx	4K	28.9 mm x 13.5 mm	28.9 mm	Red Mini-Mag	125.5 x 143.85 x 102	1588 g;
Red Epic-W Gemini 5K S35	2018	Gemini 5K S35	5120 × 3000	5K	.r3d + ProRes/Avid DNx	4K	30.72 mm x 18 mm	35.61 mm	Red Mini-Mag	125.5 x 143.85 x 102	1520 g;
Red Epic-W Helium 8K S35	2016	Helium 8K S35	8192 × 4320	8K	.r3d + ProRes/Avid DNx	4K	29.90 mm x 15.77 mm	33.80 mm	Red Mini-Mag	125.5 x 143.85 x 102	1520 g;
DSMC2 Dragon-X 6K S35, formerly DSMC2 Dragon-X 5K S35	2018	Dragon-X 6K S35	6144 × 3160	6K	.r3d + ProRes/Avid DNx	4K	30.7 mm x 15.8 mm	34.5 mm	Red Mini-Mag	125.5 x 143.85 x 102	1520 g;
DSMC2 Gemini 5K S35	2018	Gemini 5K S35	5120 × 3000	5K	.r3d + ProRes/Avid DNx	4K	30.72 mm x 18 mm	35.61 mm	Red Mini-Mag	125.5 x 143.85 x 102	1520 g;
DSMC2 Dragon 6K S35 (CF, Mg), formerly Weapon 6K (Carbon Fiber, Magnesium)	2015	Dragon 6K	6144 × 3160	6K	.r3d + ProRes/Avid DNx	4K	30.72 mm x 15.30 mm	34.5 mm	Red Mini-Mag	125.5 x 143.85 x 102	1497 g;
DSMC2 Helium 8K S35, formerly Weapon 8K S35, (Aluminum, CF, White Limited Edition)	2016	Helium 8K S35	8192 × 4320	8K	.r3d + ProRes/Avid DNx	4K	29.90 mm x 15.77 mm	33.80 mm	Red Mini-Mag	125.5 x 143.85 x 102	1520 g;
DSMC2 Helium 8K S35 Monochrome, formerly Weapon 8k S35 Monochrome	2016	Helium 8K S35 Monochrome	8192 × 4320	8K	.r3d + ProRes/Avid DNx	4K	29.90 mm x 15.77 mm	33.80 mm	Red Mini-Mag	125.5 x 143.85 x 102	1520 g;
DSMC2 Dragon 8K VV, formerly Weapon Red Dragon 8K VV	2015	Dragon 8K VV	8192 × 4320	8K	.r3d + ProRes/Avid DNx	4K	40.96 mm x 21.60 mm	46.31 mm	Red Mini-Mag	125.5 x 143.85 x 102	1497 g;
DSMC2 Dragon 8K VV Anamorphic, formerly Weapon 8K VV Anamorphic	2015	Dragon 8K VV	6720× 4320	8K	.r3d + ProRes/Avid DNx	4K	33.60 mm x 21.60 mm	39.94 mm	Red Mini-Mag	125.5 x 143.85 x 102	1497 g;
DSMC2 Monstro 8K VV, formerly Weapon Monstro 8K VV, (Aluminum, CF, White Limited Edition)	2017	Monstro 8K VV	8192 × 4320	8K	.r3d + ProRes/Avid DNx	4K	40.96 mm x 21.60 mm	46.31 mm	Red Mini-Mag	125.5 x 143.85 x 102	1520 g;
DSMC2 Monstro 8K VV Monochrome	2018	Monstro 8K VV Monochrome	8192 × 4320	8K	.r3d + ProRes/Avid DNx	4K	40.96 mm x 21.60 mm	46.31 mm	Red Mini-Mag	125.5 x 143.85 x 102	1520 g;

=== Ranger (introduced in 2019) ===
Ranger cameras are non-modular and come complete with a comprehensive I/O and power array. They are designed for demanding, higher budget studio work. The Ranger Monstro 8K VV was introduced as available for rental only, a first for Red.

Model	Intro Yr	Sensor	Active Pixel Area	Max res at 24fps	Acquisition format	Max Apple ProRes/Avid DNx resolution	Active Imaging Area (mm)	Active Imaging Area (diagonal, mm)	Media	Dimensions (WxHxD, mm)	Weight (g) including Media Bay
Ranger Monstro 8K VV	2019	Monstro 8K VV	8192 × 4320	8K	.r3d + ProRes/Avid DNx	4K	40.96 mm x 21.60 mm	46.31 mm	Red Mini-Mag	152.35 x 160.6 x 206.36	3311 g;
Ranger Helium 8K S35	2019	Helium 8K S35	8192 × 4320	8K	.r3d + ProRes/Avid DNx	4K	29.90 mm x 15.77 mm	33.80 mm	Red Mini-Mag	152.35 x 160.6 x 206.36	3311 g;
Ranger Gemini 5K S35	2019	Gemini 5K S35	5120 × 3000	5K	.r3d + ProRes/Avid DNx	4K	30.72 mm x 18 mm	35.61 mm	Red Mini-Mag	152.35 x 160.6 x 206.36	3311 g;

=== DSMC3 (introduced in 2020-2025) ===
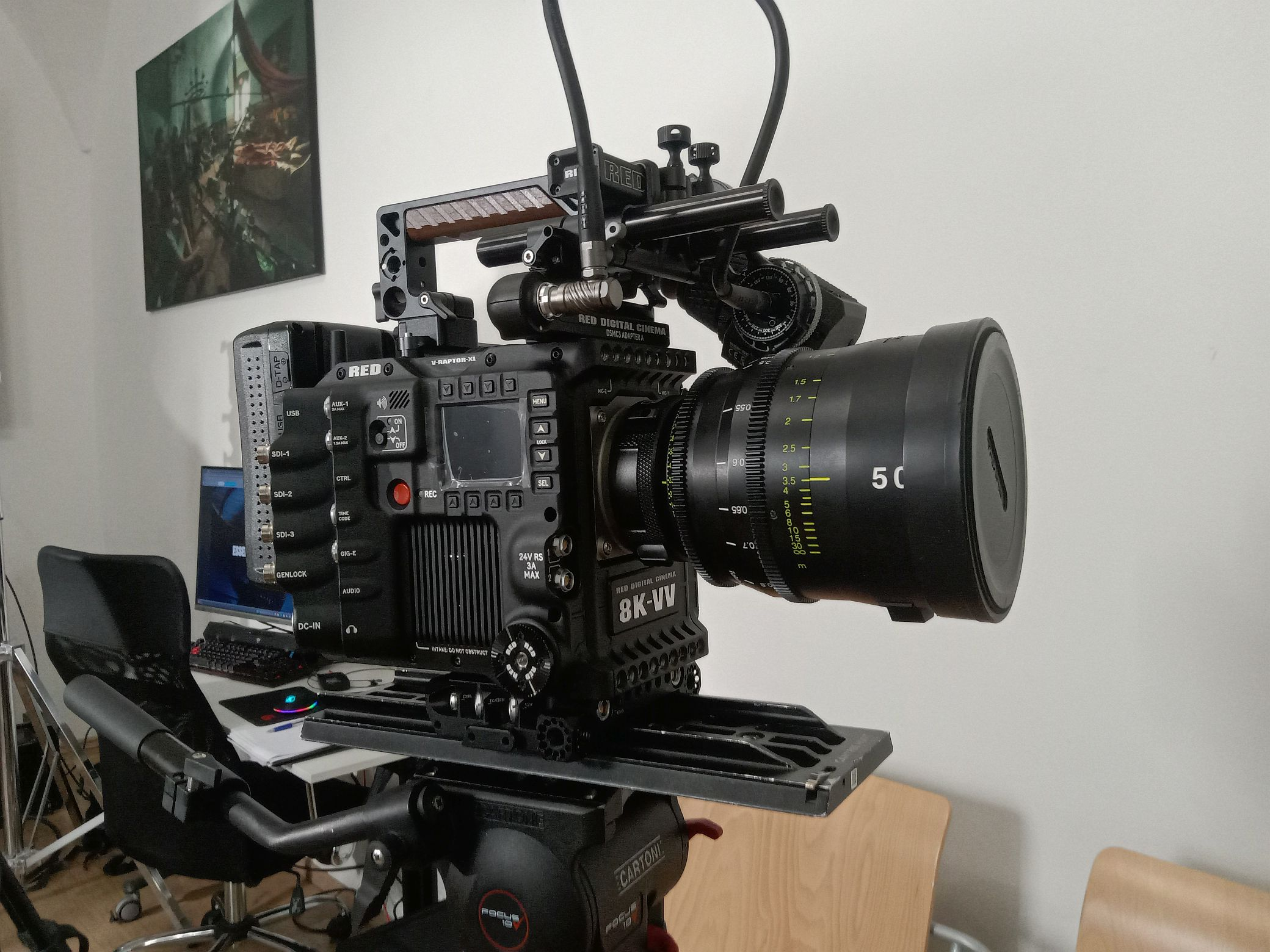
RED V-Raptor XL 8K S35

DSMC3 cameras are modular and can be customised in various configurations. Differences to the former DSMC2 line are simplified compression options (LQ, MQ and HQ instead of ratios), more competitive pricing for Netflix shooters, and including more I/O on the body. Several lens mounts can be attached to the camera, adapted from the RF mount. The V-Raptor [X], Komodo-X, and V-Raptor XE cameras are also available with native Z-mount, distinguished by a yellow lens locking mechanism.

Model	Intro Yr	Sensor	Active Pixel Area	Max res at 24fps	Acquisition format	Max Apple ProRes/Avid DNx resolution	Active Imaging Area (mm)	Active Imaging Area (diagonal, mm)	Media	Dimensions (WxHxD, mm)	Weight (g) including Media Bay
Komodo (Black, ST, Custom Color)	2020	Komodo S35 Global Shutter	6144 x 3240	6K	.r3d, ProRes	4K / –	27.03 mm x 14.26 mm	30.56 mm	CFast 2.0	111.38 x 95.26 x 105.23	952 g;
V-Raptor 8K VV (Black, ST)	2021	V-Raptor 8K VV	8192 x 4320	8K	.r3d, ProRes	4K / –	40.96 mm x 21.60 mm	46.31 mm	CFexpress	115.5 x 108 x 155.5	1828 g;
V-Raptor XL 8K VV	2021	V-Raptor 8K VV	8192 x 4320	8K	.r3d, ProRes	4K / –	40.96 mm x 21.60 mm	46.31 mm	CFexpress	159.81 x 165.9 x 200.81	3624 g;
V-Raptor 8K S35 (Black, Rhino)	2023	V-Raptor 8K S35	8192 x 4320	8K	.r3d, ProRes	4K / –	26.21 mm x 13.82 mm	29.63 mm	CFexpress	115.5 x 108 x 155.5	1814 g;
V-Raptor XL 8K S35	2023	V-Raptor 8K S35	8192 x 4320	8K	.r3d, ProRes	4K / –	26.21 mm x 13.82 mm	29.63 mm	CFexpress	159.81 x 183.4 x 200.81	3624 g;
Komodo-X (Black, ST)	2023	Komodo-X S35 Global Shutter	6144 x 3240	6K	.r3d, ProRes	4K / –	27.03 mm x 14.26 mm	30.56 mm	CFexpress	129.37 x 101.26 x 95.26	907 g;
V-Raptor [X] 8K VV	2024	V-Raptor 8K VV Global Shutter	8192 x 4320	8K	.r3d, ProRes	4K / –	40.96 mm x 21.60 mm	46.31 mm	CFexpress	115.5 x 108 x 155.5	1828 g;
V-Raptor XL [X] 8K VV	2024	V-Raptor 8K VV Global Shutter	8192 x 4320	8K	.r3d, ProRes	4K / –	40.96 mm x 21.60 mm	46.31 mm	CFexpress	159.81 x 165.9 x 200.81	3624 g;
V-Raptor XE 8K VV	2025	V-Raptor 8K VV Global Shutter	8192 x 4320	8K	.r3d, ProRes	4K / –	40.96 mm x 21.60 mm	46.31 mm	CFexpress	115.5 x 108 x 155.5	1828 g;

=== Panavision ===
Since 2016, Panavision has produced cameras based on Red's sensors.

Model	Intro Yr	Sensor	Active Pixel Area	Max res at 24fps	Acquisition format	Max Apple ProRes/Avid DNx resolution	Active Imaging Area (mm)	Active Imaging Area (diagonal, mm)	Media	Dimensions (WxHxD, mm)	Weight (g) including Media Bay
Millennium DXL	2016	Dragon 8K	8192 x 4320	8K	.r3d + ProRes/Avid DNx	4K	40.96 mm x 21.60 mm	46.31 mm	Mini RedMag SSD	334.47 x 165.27 x 178.33	4530 g;
Millennium DXL2	2018	Monstro 8K	8192 x 4320	8K	.r3d + ProRes/Avid DNx	4K	40.96 mm x 21.60 mm	46.31 mm	Mini RedMag SSD	334.47 x 165.27 x 178.33	4530 g;

Red has also made custom cameras for a few filmmakers, including Michael Bay's "Bayhem" Helium 8K and Komodo 6K, as well as David Fincher’s Xenomorph. A remote camera head for tight spaces that just contains the sensor block, similar to a system that Sony developed, was also produced for an unmentioned customer.

=== Nikon and Red ===
The Nikon ZR is a full-frame digital cinema camera announced by Nikon on 10 September 2025. It is the company’s first model co-developed with RED Digital Cinema, following Nikon’s acquisition of RED in 2024. The ZR is part of Nikon’s new Z-Cinema series and was released in late October 2025.

A wide variety of lens can be used:

- It can use all of the Nikon Z-mount lenses.
- It can use Nikon F-mount lenses through the use of an FTZ II adapter.
- It can use PL-mount lenses via the following mount adapters:
  - RED Z to PL Adapter Pack: Enables the use of PL-mount lenses on Z-mount RED Digital Cinema cameras.
  - RED Z to PL with Electronic ND Adapter Pack: Similar to the previous, but includes an integrated electronic ND feature which allows a user to rapidly adjust exposure in 1/4, 1/3, or full stops.

== Sensors ==
Through at least 2025, Red deployed a tick tock strategy. Red stated sensors are their most important asset. The Dragon sensor received a score of 101 DxO Mark sensor rating. This marked the first time a digital cinema camera was tested alongside leading stills cameras. For economical reasons Scarlet-W and Dragon-X cameras have the same 6K Dragon sensor used in the original DSMC generation, but only 5K image area of it is utilized in Scarlet-W. Red Raven has a "hard" 4.5K sensor.

Sensor	Intro Yr	Resolution in pixels	Resolution Megapixels	Base ISO	Max speed at full res	Pixel pitch (μm)	Native color balance	Dynamic range	S/N-ratio
Mysterium	2007	4900 x 2580	12.6 MP	400	30	5.4 μm	5000K	11.5 stops	60 dB
Mysterium-X	2009	5120 x 2700	13.8 MP	800	96	5.4 μm	5000K	13 stops	66 dB
Mysterium-X Monochrome	2009	5120 x 2700	13.8 MP	2000	96	5.4 μm	5000K	13 stops	66 dB
Dragon	2012	6144 x 3160	19.4 MP	800	75	5 μm	5000K	16.5 stops	80 dB
Dragon Monochrome	2012	6144 x 3160	19.4 MP	2000	75	5 μm	5000K	16.5 stops	80 dB
Dragon-X 6K S35	2018	6144 x 3160	19.4 MP	800	75	5 μm	–	16.5 stops	80 dB
Gemini 5K S35	2018	5120 × 3000	15.4 MP	800 and 3200	96	6 μm	5000K	16.5 stops	80 dB
Helium 8K S35	2016	8192 x 4320	35.4 MP	800	60	3.65 μm	5000K	16.5 stops	80 dB
Helium 8K S35 Monochrome	2017	8192 x 4320	35.4 MP	2000	60	3.65 μm	5000K	16.5 stops	80 dB
Dragon 8K VV	2015	8192 x 4320	35.4 MP	800	60	5 μm	5000K	16.5 stops	80 dB
Monstro 8K VV	2017	8192 x 4320	35.4 MP	800	60	5 μm	5000K	17 stops	80 dB
Monstro 8K VV Monochrome	2018	8192 x 4320	35.4 MP	2000	60	5 μm	–	17 stops	80 dB
Komodo S35 Global Shutter	2021	6144 x 3240	19.9 MP	800	40	4.4 μm	5000K?	16+ stops	? dB
V-Raptor 8K VV	2021	8192 × 4320	35.4 MP	800	120	5 μm	5000K?	17+ stops	? dB
V-Raptor 8K S35	2023	8192 × 4320	35.4 MP	800	120	3.2 μm	5000K?	17+ stops	? dB
Komodo-X S35 Global Shutter	2023	6144 x 3240	19.9 MP	800	80	4.4 μm	5000K?	16.5+ stops	? dB
V-Raptor 8K VV Global Shutter	2024	8192 × 4320	35.4 MP	800	120	5 μm	5000K?	17+ stops	? dB
Sony IMX829AQ (Nikon ZR)	2025	6048 x 3402	24.5 MP	800	60	5.94 μm	3500-10000K	15+ stops	72 dB

== Redcode ==
Redcode Raw (.r3d) is a proprietary file format that initially employed wavelet compression to reduce the raw data coming off the sensor. This allows reduced file sizes while still keeping all advantages of a non-destructive raw workflow. In the beginning Redcode was a JPEG 2000 12‑bit linear file stream with PCM sound without encryption. Several third party applications are able to read Redcode and convert it to other file formats such as Cineform Raw.

=== Red One ===
Redcode started as having two different options, named Redcode 28 and Redcode 36, later a Redcode 42 option was added. Redcode 42 records the most data and can only be selected with lower recording resolutions.

=== DSMC/DSMC2 ===
The Redcode options were replaced with compression ratios in the DSMC lineup of cameras. Since then, Redcode recorded 16-bits of information per color channel. Users choose between compression ratios of 2:1 and 22:1. Depending on the recording resolution, frame rate, and the camera body, some ratios could be unavailable. A compression ratio of 8:1 is selected by default.

=== DSMC3 ===
RED switched to using DCT for compression starting with the Red Komodo. The granular compression ratios were replaced with just a few quality options in the DSMC3 lineup of cameras.

Name	Meaning	Comparable to
HQ	High Quality	Compression ratio 3:1
MQ	Medium Quality	Compression ratio 5:1
LQ	Low Quality	Compression ratio 8:1
ELQ	Extra Low Quality	Compression ratio 15:1

The ELQ setting was added later. Some cinematographers still prefer using DSMC2 cameras because they offer more compression choices.

=== R3D NE ===
The R3D NE codec was introduced in 2025 alongside the Nikon ZR. It uses the same compression algorithm as Nikon N-RAW called TicoRAW and is therefore different from the traditional Redcode codecs. R3D NE records color information with 12-bits per channel just like the Red One did.

=== Extended Highlights/HDRx ===
HDRx was introduced with the DSMC line, allowing the shooter to get up to 6 extra stops of dynamic range. The goal is to preserve more detail in very bright parts of a scene. This works by recording two tracks, one being normally exposed and the other being underexposed. The underexposed track is recorded at a faster shutter speed, compromising motion clarity.

The HDRx feature is not available on DSMC3 cameras but some higher end DSMC3 cameras offer a comparable feature called Extended Highlights, which is just a simple on-off switch for three extra stops of highlight protection without any configuration options.

=== Phantom Track ===
This feature is only available on some higher end DSMC3 cameras and lets them record two views in alternating frames simultaneously to separate .r3d tracks. It is intended to be used for VFX work in virtual production environments.

== Media ==
Media type	Available sizes	Compatible cameras	Comment
RED CF	8GB (red)	Red One	CompactFlash cards. The 16GB CF card was developed by RED themselves.
RED CF	16GB (black)	Red One	CompactFlash cards. The 16GB CF card was developed by RED themselves.
RED-RAM	128GB	Red One	Proprietary enclosure for SSDs running in a RAID array. A 64GB version was initially planned, but never released.
RED-RAM	512GB	Red One	Proprietary enclosure for SSDs running in a RAID array. A 64GB version was initially planned, but never released.
RED-DRIVE (also called RED-RAID)	320GB	Red One	Two 2.5" laptop hard drives operate in a RAID-0 or RAID-1 array, depending on configuration.
RED-DRIVE (also called RED-RAID)	640GB	Red One	Two 2.5" laptop hard drives operate in a RAID-0 or RAID-1 array, depending on configuration.
REDMAG	48GB (gray)	DSMC lineup, Red One (excluding 48GB and 240GB versions)	Proprietary interconnect to off‑the‑shelf mSATA SSD. The 48GB REDMAG has significantly limited write speeds and can only be used with high compression ratios, the 64GB, 128GB, and 240GB REDMAGs have slightly limited write speeds. A 32GB version was also developed, but never sold.
REDMAG	64GB (black)	DSMC lineup, Red One (excluding 48GB and 240GB versions)	Proprietary interconnect to off‑the‑shelf mSATA SSD. The 48GB REDMAG has significantly limited write speeds and can only be used with high compression ratios, the 64GB, 128GB, and 240GB REDMAGs have slightly limited write speeds. A 32GB version was also developed, but never sold.
REDMAG	128GB (black)	DSMC lineup, Red One (excluding 48GB and 240GB versions)	Proprietary interconnect to off‑the‑shelf mSATA SSD. The 48GB REDMAG has significantly limited write speeds and can only be used with high compression ratios, the 64GB, 128GB, and 240GB REDMAGs have slightly limited write speeds. A 32GB version was also developed, but never sold.
REDMAG	240GB (black)	DSMC lineup, Red One (excluding 48GB and 240GB versions)	Proprietary interconnect to off‑the‑shelf mSATA SSD. The 48GB REDMAG has significantly limited write speeds and can only be used with high compression ratios, the 64GB, 128GB, and 240GB REDMAGs have slightly limited write speeds. A 32GB version was also developed, but never sold.
REDMAG	256GB (black)	DSMC lineup, Red One (excluding 48GB and 240GB versions)	Proprietary interconnect to off‑the‑shelf mSATA SSD. The 48GB REDMAG has significantly limited write speeds and can only be used with high compression ratios, the 64GB, 128GB, and 240GB REDMAGs have slightly limited write speeds. A 32GB version was also developed, but never sold.
REDMAG	512GB (red)	DSMC lineup, Red One (excluding 48GB and 240GB versions)	Proprietary interconnect to off‑the‑shelf mSATA SSD. The 48GB REDMAG has significantly limited write speeds and can only be used with high compression ratios, the 64GB, 128GB, and 240GB REDMAGs have slightly limited write speeds. A 32GB version was also developed, but never sold.
RED Mini-Mag	120GB (black)	DSMC lineup, DSMC2 lineup	Proprietary interconnect to off‑the‑shelf mSATA SSD. The 512GB Mini-Mag only has 480GB of usable capacity. The 120GB and 240GB Mini-Mags have slightly limited write speeds.
RED Mini-Mag	240GB (black)	DSMC lineup, DSMC2 lineup	Proprietary interconnect to off‑the‑shelf mSATA SSD. The 512GB Mini-Mag only has 480GB of usable capacity. The 120GB and 240GB Mini-Mags have slightly limited write speeds.
RED Mini-Mag	480GB (red)	DSMC lineup, DSMC2 lineup	Proprietary interconnect to off‑the‑shelf mSATA SSD. The 512GB Mini-Mag only has 480GB of usable capacity. The 120GB and 240GB Mini-Mags have slightly limited write speeds.
RED Mini-Mag	512GB (black or red)	DSMC lineup, DSMC2 lineup	Proprietary interconnect to off‑the‑shelf mSATA SSD. The 512GB Mini-Mag only has 480GB of usable capacity. The 120GB and 240GB Mini-Mags have slightly limited write speeds.
RED Mini-Mag	960GB (red)	DSMC lineup, DSMC2 lineup	Proprietary interconnect to off‑the‑shelf mSATA SSD. The 512GB Mini-Mag only has 480GB of usable capacity. The 120GB and 240GB Mini-Mags have slightly limited write speeds.
RED Mini-Mag	1TB (red)	DSMC lineup, DSMC2 lineup	Proprietary interconnect to off‑the‑shelf mSATA SSD. The 512GB Mini-Mag only has 480GB of usable capacity. The 120GB and 240GB Mini-Mags have slightly limited write speeds.
CFast 2.0	512GB	Komodo	RED-branded CFast 2.0 card from Angelbird
CF Express Type B	660GB	DSMC3 lineup (excluding Komodo)	RED-branded CF Express Type B card from Angelbird
CF Express Type B	1TB	DSMC3 lineup (excluding Komodo)	RED-branded CF Express Type B card from Angelbird
CF Express Type B	1.3TB	DSMC3 lineup (excluding Komodo)	RED-branded CF Express Type B card from Angelbird
CF Express Type B	2TB	DSMC3 lineup (excluding Komodo)	RED-branded CF Express Type B card from Angelbird
CF Express Type B	4TB	DSMC3 lineup (excluding Komodo)	RED-branded CF Express Type B card from Angelbird

The footage from Red cameras can also be captured over a LAN network using the Red Tether application. Since older Red cameras only featured a Gigabit-Ethernet connection, this resulted in reduced recording frame rates and higher compression ratios. DSMC2 cameras require a compatible expansion module, as the camera body itself doesn't feature Ethernet connectivity.

== RCP Development Kit ==
Announced at NAB 2013 and launched in 2014, The RCP Development Kit is a SDK (software development kit) that allows programmers to create custom applications to control their camera via mobile device, computer, or micro-controller. The kit included the Redlink Bridge, a wireless module that allows apps to communicate with the camera. The bridge supports a wireless communication range of approximately 50 feet.

== Workflow ==
=== Redcine-X Pro ===
Redcine-X Pro is a free-of-charge post-processing software collection developed by Red, built specifically for Red camera systems. It includes a coloring toolset, integrated timeline, and post effects software collection for both stills and motion. The post-production software allows for non-destructive manipulation of raw .R3D files. Redcine-X was the first workflow software developed solely by Red. Like Redcine, Red offered it as an end-to-end workflow solution for Red customers. It preceded the current Redcine-X Pro.

With Redcine-X Pro, users can mark frames while shooting and access those specific frames within their timeline. Users can take advantage of the countless color grading and raw adjustment options. Additionally, there were features like A.D.D. (Advanced Dragon Debayer), a complex algorithm that analyzes every pixel and is only available for footage captured on specific sensors.

==== Previous Workflow Software ====
"Red Alert!" was the first form of workflow made available to Red owners/operators, though it was more of a diagnostic tool. It allowed Red One users to tweak debayer settings and render out to dpx/tiff/mov.

Redcine was the first end-to-end workflow for Red users. A third-party company developed the software, and Red provided the SDK.

=== Hardware accelerators ===
==== Red Rocket ====
Red Rocket is an internal PCI Express card that is capable of 4K, 2K, or 1080p real-time debayering and video playback of R3D files coming from Mysterium and Mysterium-X sensors. It can be used to accelerate video editing in compatible Non-linear editing systems, outputting the image via HD-SDI to a user-supplied monitor. A component of the Red Rocket allows users to convert the HD-SDI signal to four HDMI outputs.

==== Red Rocket-X ====
Red Rocket-X is an internal PCI Express card optimized for the 6K Dragon sensor and is designed to accelerate the processing of R3D workflow, regardless of resolution. Compared to Red Rocket, Red Rocket-X processes and transcodes files up to five times faster.

The Red Rocket cards are no longer supported by Redcine-X Pro since 2022 in favor of GPU-based video decoding.

=== Third party workflow systems ===
Red offers the Red Apple Workflow Installer, which allows R3D Raw settings within Final Cut Pro X. Other applications include support for QuickTime to use .R3D files, and plugins for Adobe Photoshop, Adobe Premiere Pro, Avid Media Composer, Final Cut Pro X, and Sony Vegas Pro.

== Notable accessories ==
=== 3-Axis lens control system ===
The Red 3-Axis lens control system is a turn-key wireless lens control kit for driving focus, iris and zoom using the Red Lens Control Motor. Included is the T.H.C. (Tactical Hand Controller), a wireless remote that allows the operator to adjust lens settings from a distance.

=== Motion Mount ===
The motion mount is a lineup of lens mounts, available in multiple EF- and PL-mount versions. The motion mount is compatible with DSMC and DSMC2 cameras, excluding the Red Raven. It transforms the camera from rolling shutter to global shutter and offers internal ND control. Using the motion mount results in a light loss of at least 1.6 stops without the additional ND feature engaged. The ND feature of the motion mount changes the look of out-of-focus areas. It didn't receive widespread adoption due to its high price.

=== Meizler Module ===
The Meizler Module was an accessory aimed at larger productions that offered live wireless video, wireless timecode, simultaneous proxy recording with Red Mini-Mags, wireless camera control, wireless focus, iris, and zoom (FIZ) control, all in a single module. Even though the accessory was showcased at NAB, IBC, and even appeared in product catalogues, it was never sold. Other accessories that were supposed to work together with the Meizler Module include a Redlink Video Receiver (HD-SDI), Redlink Video Receiver (HDMI), Redsync Master, Meizler-to-Redmote Dock, as well as adapters and cables. A Proxy Module was planned as a more affordable alternative to the Meizler Module and only featured the proxy recording capability.

=== 4K Broadcast module ===
The 4K Broadcast module was an accessory aimed at broadcast productions that offered 4K live wireless video via four 3G-SDI connectors, whose outputs would be spliced together. Even though the accessory was announced and demonstrated at NAB, it was never sold.

=== Rear SSD module ===
The Rear SSD module, which was announced at NAB 2012, was a niche accessory for DSMC1 cameras that allowed stereoscopic 3D productions to achieve a closer interaxial distance without the use of a beamsplitter. Compared the Side SSD module, the Rear SSD module didn't feature any buttons, but still offered a status LED. It accepted the traditional 1.8" REDMAGs.

=== RED Focus ===
The RED Focus was a PL-mount accessory that allowed camera operators to verify the backfocus on their camera for which RED-branded AA-batteries were created.
