= Keldysh Institute of Applied Mathematics =

Research institute specializing in computational mathematics

Coordinates: 55°46′37.57″N 37°35′24.8″E

- Федеральный исследовательский центр Институт прикладной математики им. М. В. Келдыша Российской академии наук
- Type: Public
- Established: 1953
- Affiliations: Russian Academy of Sciences
- Principal: Alexander Aptekarev
- Postgraduates: 155
- Doctoral students: 91
- Location: Miusskaya pl., 4, 125047, Moscow, Russia
- Website: www.keldysh.ru

The Keldysh Institute of Applied Mathematics (Russian: Институт прикладной математики им. М.В.Келдыша, ИПМ) is a research institute specializing in computational mathematics. It was established to solve computational tasks related to government programs of nuclear and fusion energy, space research and missile technology. The Institute is a part of the Department of Mathematical Sciences of the Russian Academy of Sciences. The main direction of activity of the institute is the use of computer technology to solve complex scientific and technical issues of practical importance. Since 2016, the development of mathematical and computational methods for biological research, as well as a direct solution to the problems of computational biology with the use of such methods, has also been included in the circle of scientific activities of the institute.

== Scientific activity ==
=== Nuclear physics ===
Theoretical physicist Yakov Zeldovich headed one of the departments placed in charge of the theoretical aspects of the work on the creation of nuclear and thermonuclear weapons. Alexander Samarskii performed the first realistic calculations of macrokinetics of chain reaction of a nuclear explosion, which led to the practical importance estimated power of nuclear weapons. In relation to nuclear energy, the institute was also involved in modelling of processes of neutron transport and nuclear reactions. In particular, E. Kuznetsov is known for his work on the theory of nuclear reactors.

Currently, such work in KIAM is continuing in the field of plasma physics and controlled thermonuclear fusion, which began under the leadership of Sergei Kurdyumov, A. A. Samarskii, Yu. P. Popov.

=== Cosmonautics ===
Dmitry Okhotsimsky directed the works in the department created for research of the dynamics of space flight. In 1966, the department was reorganized into the Ballistic Centre. The Ballistic Centre was involved in the calculations of optimal orbit trajectory and actual corrections for all space flights, from uncrewed interplanetary and lunar vehicles to the crewed "Soyuz" and orbital station "Salyut" and "Mir". The institute took an active part in the creation of the Soviet space shuttle "Buran".

KIAM continues to engage in Russian space projects. Current research is connected with:

- development of systems for management and navigation of space vehicles in real time with the use of global satellite navigation systems GPS and GLONASS;
- exploration of prospects for further interplanetary missions using electric rocket engines;
- participation in such projects as "RadioAstron" and Fobos-Grunt.

=== Mathematics and Mathematical Modelling ===
One of the greatest mathematicians of the twentieth century Israel Gelfand was at the head of the Department of heat transmission before his departure for the United States in 1989. He was carrying out the fundamental works on functional analysis, algebra and topology. Andrey Nikolayevich Tikhonov worked initially also in these areas of mathematics. However, Tikhonov is better known for his works of more applied orientation, such as methods for solving ill-posed problems (Tikhonov regularization). Tikhonov also created the theory of differential equations with a small parameter at the highest derivative. The general theory of stability of difference schemes was developed by A. A. Samarskii. Samarskii considered mathematical modelling as an independent scientific discipline. Sergei Kurdyumov created a whole scientific school in nonlinear dynamics and synergetics in Russia.

Currently, the existing arsenal of numerical methods is updated and improved in response to the growing complexity of the models and the possibilities of modern supercomputers. Scientists of KIAM elaborate grid methods for solving computational problems, which has led, in particular, to the creation of a declarative language "Norma".

=== Computers and Programming ===
The first studies were carried out still on mechanical calculators "Mercedes" by a large staff of estimators. Currently, work is underway to create a distributed computing system based on combining several supercomputers, which are used for grid – technology and developed a specialized operating system (DVM).

=== Robotics ===
Currently, work on robotics is carried out in:

- the Group of V. E. Pavlovsky of the Sector under the guidance of A. K. Platonov (virtual football),
- the Group of S. M. Sokolov (vision systems),
- the Group of V. E. Pryanishnikova (autonomous tracked vehicles).

=== Computational biology ===
Since 2016, the sphere of interest of KIAM includes also computational biology problems, which are solved in IMPB RAS – Branch of KIAM RAS in Pushchino.

=== Specialized research projects ===
- The project "RadioAstron"
- The project "Norma"
- The project "DVM"
- The project "GNS"
- The project "grid" (multiprocessor computations)
- The project "Virtual football"
- International Scientific Optical Network (ISON)

=== Teaching and social activities ===
Most of the leading employees of KIAM worked part-time as professors of the Moscow State University and Moscow Institute of Physics and Technology. A. N. Tikhonov was the organizer and first Dean of the Faculty of Computational Mathematics and Cybernetics.

I. M. Gelfand was engaged in the mathematical education of secondary school pupils.

== History ==
=== Milestones ===
The institute is located in Moscow, Russia. In 1978, it is named after Mstislav Keldysh. The institute was created in 1966 when it split from Steklov Institute of Mathematics. Already as the Department of Applied Mathematics of Steklov Institute it had conducted some outstanding research in the field of space exploration: in 1953 it developed the method of ballistic spacecraft descent, that was used on 12 April 1961 for Yuri Gagarin's return to the Earth, and in 1957 Sputnik 1 orbit was calculated there using the computer processing of optical observation data.

As a result of the reorganization in RAS of 2015–2016 years Institute of Mathematical Problems of Biology became a branch of KIAM.

=== Principals ===
- 1953–1978 Keldysh, Mstislav Vsevolodovich, President of the USSR Academy of Sciences, mathematician.
- 1978–1989 Tikhonov, Andrey Nikolayevich, Academician of RAS, mathematician.
- 1989–1999 Kurdyumov, Sergei Pavlovich, Corresponding Member of the Russian Academy of Sciences, mathematician.
- 1999–2008 Popov, Yuriy Petrovich, Corresponding Member of the Russian Academy of Sciences, mathematician.
- 2008–2015 Chetverushkin, Boris Nikolaevich, Academician of RAS, mathematician.
- 2016-2024 Aptekarev, Alexander Ivanovich, Corresponding Member of the Russian Academy of Sciences, mathematician.
- since 2025 Yakobovskiy, Mikhail Vladimirovich, Corresponding Member of the Russian Academy of Sciences, mathematician.

=== The organizations that were separated out ===
- 1955 — Dorodnitsyn Computing Centre.
- 1965 — Space Research Institute, established on the basis of one of the departments of KIAM to develop scientific space flight programs.
- 1990 — Institute for Mathematical Modelling, based on department A. A. Samarskii.

=== Famous faculty and alumni ===
- Gelfand, Israel Moiseevich, Academician of the USSR Academy of Sciences, mathematician of world renown.
- Godunov, Sergei Konstantinovich, Academician of the USSR Academy of Sciences, mathematician of world renown.
- Lyapunov, Alexey Andreevich, Corresponding Member of the USSR Academy of Sciences, one of the founders of cybernetics in the USSR.
- Okhotsimsky, Dmitry Yevgenyevich, Academician of RAS, cosmonautics and robotics.
- Eneev, Timur Magometovich, Academician of RAS, cosmonautics and cosmogony.
- Yablonsky, Sergey Vsevolodovich, Corresponding Member of RAS, one of the founders of cybernetics in the USSR.
- Yanenko, Nikolai Nikolaevich, Academician of the USSR Academy of Sciences, mathematician and engineer.
- Zeldovich, Yakov Borisovich, Academician of the USSR Academy of Sciences, nuclear physics and astrophysics
