= Taiko (disambiguation) =

Taiko may refer to:

- Taiko (太鼓) The Japanese word for drum often used to refer to any Japanese drum or drumming music
- Taikō (太閤) a title given to a retired Kampaku regent in Japan.
  - Commonly refers to Toyotomi Hideyoshi
- Chatham Island taiko or Magenta petrel (Pterodroma magentae) bird
- Taiko (ship) a Norwegian roll-on/roll-off (RoRo) freighter
- Taiko no Tatsujin, a series of rhythm video games
- Taikonaut, a term used in news media for Chinese astronauts
- Taikō Yoshio, Japanese sumo wrestler
- Taiko: An Epic Novel of War and Glory in Feudal Japan, a novel by Eiji Yoshikawa, translated by William Scott Wilson
- Taiko (album), by Danger

== See also ==
- Tyco (disambiguation)
- Tycho (disambiguation)
