= Dmitry Okhotsimsky =

Soviet Russian aerospace engineer and scientist

- Дмитрий Охоцимский
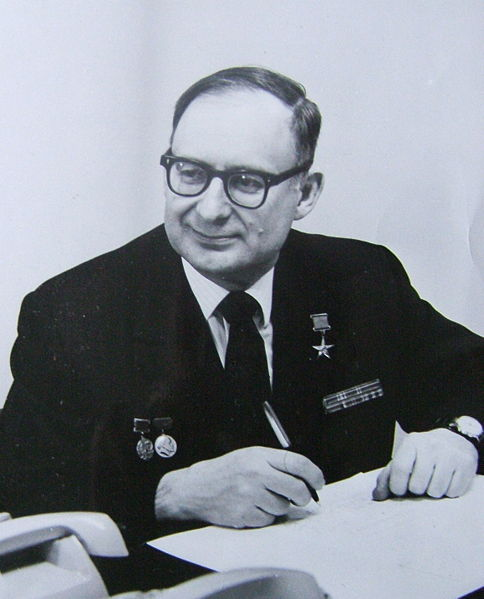
- Born: Dmitry Yevgenyevich Okhotsimsky; 26 February 1921; Moscow, RSFSR
- Died: 18 December 2005 (aged 84); Moscow, Russia
- Resting place: Troyekurovskoye Cemetery
- Education: Moscow State University
- Occupations: Soviet and Russian space scientist
- Spouse: Sophia Aleksandrovna Ivanova
- Children: 2
- Scientific career
- Workplaces: Moscow State University; Keldysh Institute of Applied Mathematics
- Academic advisors: Mstislav Keldysh
- Notable students: Vasily Sarychev

Dmitry Yevgenyevich Okhotsimsky (Russian: Дми́трий Евге́ньевич Охоци́мский; 26 February 1921 - 18 December 2005) was a Russian engineer in the former Soviet space program who pioneered the studies in robotics, controls, and space ballistics.

He wrote fundamental works in applied celestial mechanics, spaceflight dynamics and robotics.

== Biography ==
Okhotsimsky was born and lived his whole life in Moscow. His father, Yevgeny Pavlovich Okhotsimsky, was an accountant/auditor, his mother a housewife. Okhotsimsky was very attached to his parents and always lived together with them. At the age of fifteen he suffered diphtheria in a hard form and was prohibited from any sports or physical activity. Nevertheless, he showed his whole life remarkable energy and good health, and was actively working until his death at the age of 84.

He entered the Department of Mechanics and Mathematics of the Moscow State University in 1939. When World War II broke, the department was temporarily closed. He participated in the building of defense installations around Moscow, worked at the munitions factory. In 1941 he was conscripted to the Red Army but was dismissed in 1942 for vision problems (severe nearsightedness) and returned to the University.

In 1946 he presented a paper about the optimization of the missile flight, where he was able to find an analytical solution using an original technique of calculus of variations, a precursor in some respects to what was later formulated in a more general form as the Pontryagin's maximum principle (from Lev Pontryagin). In 1949 he joined the Mathematical Institute of the Russian Academy of Sciences, where was working in the department of Applied Mathematics led by Mstislav Keldysh, the future President of the Russian Academy of Sciences. Keldysh was an active member of the think tank behind the space program and his support was instrumental for active integration of Okhotsimsky and his group in space projects. Later the department of Keldysh became a separate institute currently known as the Keldysh Institute of Applied Mathematics and the group of Okhotsimsky became a department in this institute, which he was leading until his death.

== Space ballistics ==
Since his first student work, Okhotsimsky was interested in analytical and numerical solution of variational problems to which the optimization of space mission can be reduced: how the mission can achieve its target with the minimal total fuel consumption (possibly combined with other criteria and restrictions). Using first Soviet computers (such as Strela computer, he worked with his colleagues to develop new generation of numerical methods and principles of programming. After the launch of the first satellite he published a few papers were the mathematical aspects of the launch and evolution of the orbit were analyzed.

Okhotsimsky's leadership was instrumental in the development within his department of the remarkable group of young talents collectively nicknamed "Keldysh boys". Many of them became well-known, such as Efraim Akim, Timur Eneev and Mikhail Lidov. Okhotsimsky contributed to the planning of multiple space missions including launches to Moon, Mars and Venus. His analysis of the first failed docking attempts on Soyuz spacecraft helped to quickly find a reason of mechanical instability and develop successful docking techniques. Together with Yuri Golubev and Yuri Sikharulidze he developed a concept of a dual-entry aerodynamically controlled landing algorithm of a spacecraft where the two-stage entry was used to reduce speed and achieve an accuracy of landing of a few km. He developed the methods on the passive stabilization of satellites using the gravity gradient and the non-sphericity of the tensor of inertia.

== Rocket design ==
Okhotsimsky's team, along with a group managed by Mikhail Tikhonravov at NII-4, did analysis and optimization of multi-stage rocket designs. Okhotsimsky studied the general problem of how rockets could increase their range by dropping parts of their construction during flight. This included sequential stages and parallel "packet" rockets and schemes involving the pumping of fuel between stages during flight. This led directly to the design of the R-7 missile and the exact proportions of its strap-on booster stages.

== Robotics ==
In the middle of the 1970s Okhotsimsky became interested in robotics, especially in the modeling and control of insect-like walking. A few successful models of 6-legged walking robots were created including systems with autonomous vision able to climb the stairs and handle complicated terrain. In the work of Okhotsimsky and his school realistic mechanical modeling of the motion was typically combined with sophisticated algorithms adapted to the context of a particular task. He usually advocated a "from the bottom up" approach aimed at first handling particular low-level problems and then moving to assembling a more general setup. He thought that this is the way the nature works in the making of live creatures.

== Positions and social activity ==
Okhotsimsky combined the talents of a scientist and an administrator. His career was closely linked to the section of Mechanics and Control of the Soviet/Russian Academy of Sciences, of which he was a deputy-secretary. Parallel to his main work in the Keldysh Institute of Applied Mathematics, he was appointed in 1962 a chair of Theoretical Mechanics at the Department of Mathematics and Mechanics at the Moscow State University and performed both functions until his last days. He was always striving to find practical forms of cooperation between the Academy of Science and the University. Until his last days he remained a staunch supporter of the leading role of the Academy of Science as a center of fundamental research in Russia. Okhotsimsky was one of the 5 initiators of the creation of the Department of Control and Applied Mathematics at the Moscow Institute of Physics and Technology.

== Awards and honors ==
- Member of the Russian Academy of Sciences, Corresponding Member since 1960, Academician since 1991
- Foreign Member of the Serbian Academy of Sciences and Arts since 2000
- Lenin Prize (1957)
- Hero of Socialist Labour (1961)
- Two Orders of Lenin (1956, 1961)
- Two Orders of the Red Banner of Labour (1970, 1981)
- Order of the October Revolution (1975)
- USSR State Prize, 1970 (for his contribution to the lunar mission "Luna-16")
- Gold Keldysh medal, 2001 (awarded by the Russian Academy of Sciences for works in mechanics)
- Minor planet 8062 discovered by astronomer Nikolai Chernykh on March 13, 1997 was named Okhotsymskij in his honor.

== Published works ==
- Охоцимский Д. Е., Голубев Е. Ф., Сихарулидзе Ю. Г., Алгоритм управления космическим аппаратом при входе в атмосферу - М, Наука, 1975.
- Охоцимский Д.Е., Голубев Ю.Ф.Механика и управление движением автоматического шагающего аппарата - М., Наука, 1984.
- Охоцимский Д.Е.,Сихарулидзе Ю.Г. Основы механики космического полета. - М., Наука, 1990
