= Institute of Mathematical Problems of Biology =

Russian research institute

Coordinates: 54°50′35″N 37°37′25″E

IMPB RAS
- Институт математических проблем биологии РАН – филиал Федерального государственного учреждения "Федеральный исследовательский центр Институт прикладной математики им. М. В. Келдыша Российской академии наук
- Type: Public
- Established: 1972
- Affiliations: Russian Academy of Sciences
- Chancellor: Victor Lakhno
- Postgraduates: 55
- Doctoral students: 19
- Location: 1, Vitkevicha str., 142290, Pushchino, Moscow region, Russia
- Website: www.impb.ru

The Institute of Mathematical Problems of Biology RAS (Russian: Институт математических проблем биологии) is a research institute specializing in computational biology and bioinformatics. The objective of the institute is elaboration of mathematical and computational methods for biological research, as well as implementation of these methods directly addressing the problems of computational biology. Since 2016, it has been renamed into the Institute of Mathematical Problems of Biology RAS – the Branch of Keldysh Institute of Applied Mathematics of Russian Academy of Sciences (IMPB RAS – Branch of KIAM RAS).

The Institute publishes the scientific journal "Mathematical biology & bioinformatics".

== Structure of the Institute ==
Affiliated to the Institute are:

- Laboratory of Macromolecular Crystallography
- Laboratory of Quantum-Mechanical Systems
- Laboratory of Molecular Dynamics
- Laboratory of Neural Networks
- Laboratory of Applied Mathematics
- Laboratory of Bioinformatics
- Laboratory of Computational Ecology
- Laboratory of Data Processing
- Department of Prospective Information Technologies
- Department of Computing and Informational Resources

== Scientific activity ==
=== Research directions ===
- Theoretical development;
- Computational biology
- Synergetics (including topics such as: dynamic system, chaos theory, nonequilibrium thermodynamics, systems biology)
- Bioinformatics
- Concurrent computing

=== Specialized research projects ===
- The project "Mathematical Cell";
- The project "Generalized Spectral-Analytical Method" (GSAM).

== History ==
=== Milestones ===
The Institute of Mathematical Problems of Biology RAS (IMPB RAS) was founded in 1972. When organized, the Institute received the name of the Research Computing Centre (RCC) of the USSR Academy of Sciences. In 1992 the Research Computing Centre was reorganized into the Institute of Mathematical Problems of Biology RAS.

As a result of the reorganization in RAS of 2015–16 IMPB has become a branch of KIAM since 15 February 2016.

=== Principals ===
- 1972–98 Molchanov, Albert Makarievich, director, mathematician.
- 1998–2016 Lakhno, Viktor Dmitrievich, director, mathematician.
- since 2016 Lakhno, Viktor Dmitrievich, branch manager, mathematician.

=== Famous faculty and alumni ===
- Shnol, Emmanuel El'evich
