= Thierry Pauwels =

Belgian astronomer

Minor planets discovered: 147
see § List of discovered minor planets

Thierry Pauwels (born 22 July 1957, Ghent) is a Belgian astronomer from the Royal Observatory of Belgium. Between 1996 and 2008 he discovered and co-discovered 146 minor planets. This makes him one of the top 100 minor planet discoverers.

The main-belt asteroid 12761 Pauwels, discovered by his colleague Eric Elst at La Silla Observatory in 1993, was named after him in 1993. Naming citation was published on 18 March 2003 (M.P.C. 48156).

== List of discovered minor planets ==
(10214) 1997 RT_{9}	September 10, 1997
(11633) 1996 XG_{9}	December 2, 1996
13690 Lesleymartin	September 10, 1997
14539 Clocke Roeland	September 10, 1997
16908 Groeselenberg^{[1]}	February 17, 1998
22827 Arvernia	September 8, 1999
(23892) 1998 SH_{49}	September 23, 1998
(25830) 2000 DN_{110}	February 26, 2000
30018 Loemele	February 14, 2000
(33251) 1998 HS_{24}	April 22, 1998
(35473) 1998 EZ_{8}	March 9, 1998
(35474) 1998 EA_{9}	March 9, 1998
37392 Yukiniall^{[2]}	December 10, 2001
40684 Vanhoeck	September 8, 1999
(41976) 2000 YA_{15}	December 21, 2000
(42932) 1999 TF_{19}	October 12, 1999
(49592) 1999 DD_{7}	February 25, 1999
(53628) 2000 CW_{101}	February 3, 2000
(57828) 2001 XZ_{4}	December 9, 2001
(57880) 2002 AN_{3}	January 2, 2002
59369 Chanco	March 11, 1999
(59838) 1999 RU_{45}	September 9, 1999
(63160) 2000 YN_{8}	December 16, 2000
(63165) 2000 YY_{14}	December 20, 2000
(67020) 1999 XS_{137}	December 11, 1999
(71098) 1999 XV_{137}	December 11, 1999
(72041) 2000 XX_{53}	December 15, 2000
(72058) 2000 YC_{15}	December 21, 2000
(75450) 1999 XR_{137}	December 10, 1999
(76117) 2000 DM_{110}	November 26, 2000
(77757) 2001 PN_{29}	August 13, 2001
(86071) 1999 RR_{45}	September 8, 1999
91553 Claudedoom	September 8, 1999
(91573) 1999 SN_{2}^{[3]}	September 16, 1999
91604 Clausmadsen^{[2]}	October 14, 1999
(92155) 1999 XU_{137}	December 11, 1999
(94044) 2000 XW_{53}	December 15, 2000
(97576) 2000 DK_{110}	February 25, 2000
100604 Lundy	September 11, 1997
104020 Heilbronn	February 26, 2000
(106825) 2000 XY_{53}	December 15, 2000
(108087) 2001 FJ_{174}	March 19, 2001
108953 Pieraerts	August 13, 2001
(111819) 2002 DD_{1}	February 16, 2002
(118397) 1999 RO_{45}	September 8, 1999
(120726) 1997 SR_{30}	September 25, 1997
121313 Tamsin	September 8, 1999
(123611) 2000 YX_{14}	December 16, 2000
(125565) 2001 XQ_{16}	December 11, 2001
(127657) 2003 DV_{9}	February 24, 2003

(129873) 1999 RH_{214}^{[3]}	September 15, 1999
(130137) 1999 XT_{137}	December 11, 1999
(131035) 2000 XV_{53}	December 5, 2000
(131040) 2000 YM_{8}	December 16, 2000
(133431) 2003 SF_{201}	September 23, 2003
(134580) 1999 TE_{19}	October 11, 1999
(141128) 2001 XR_{88}	December 10, 2001
(143495) 2003 DW_{9}	February 24, 2003
(143618) 2003 GQ_{28}	April 7, 2003
(152300) 2005 TF_{51}	October 11, 2005
(153871) 2001 XQ_{88}	December 10, 2001
(161024) 2002 FM_{7}	March 23, 2002
164130 Jonckheere^{[4]}	March 23, 2002
(165624) 2001 FQ_{128}	March 19, 2001
(170401) 2003 TX_{17}	October 15, 2003
(177175) 2003 SM_{170}	September 21, 2003
(177197) 2003 UV_{38}	October 16, 2003
(187158) 2005 RE_{10}	September 8, 2005
189188 Floraliën	March 27, 2003
(192998) 2000 DJ_{110}	February 25, 2000
(195206) 2002 DF_{1}	February 25, 2000
(196858) 2003 SB_{269}	September 25, 2003
(197891) 2004 RR_{23}	September 8, 2004
(198614) 2005 AO_{26}	January 13, 2005
(201577) 2003 SR_{70}	September 18, 2003
(202227) 2004 YL_{1}	December 16, 2004
(202953) 1999 RS_{45}	September 8, 1999
(205078) 1999 SM_{2}^{[3]}	September 16, 1999
(205362) 2000 XF_{54}	December 15, 2000
(206394) 2003 SV_{32}	September 17, 2003
(206428) 2003 SV_{170}	September 21, 2003
(208132) 2000 DO_{110}	February 25, 2000
(210768) 2000 XR_{53}	December 4, 2000
(211569) 2003 SF_{139}	September 20, 2003
(215805) 2004 RT_{25}	September 8, 2004
(218685) 2005 TG_{51}	October 12, 2005
(219695) 2001 XO_{16}	December 10, 2001
(219719) 2001 XR_{105}	December 11, 2001
(221072) 2005 SN	September 22, 2005
(227051) 2005 CY_{25}	February 5, 2005
(227219) 2005 RZ_{4}	September 7, 2005
(229376) 2005 SP	September 7, 2005
234292 Wolfganghansch	December 16, 2000
(235852) 2005 AX_{27}^{[1]}	January 14, 2005
(241481) 2009 BM_{83}^{[1]}	January 31, 2009
(242172) 2003 GH_{53}	April 12, 2003
(242254) 2003 SC_{269}	September 25, 2003
(242975) 2006 SG_{126}	September 21, 2006
(247821) 2003 SN_{170}	September 22, 2003
(252131) 2000 XD_{54}	December 4, 2000

(252156) 2001 BJ_{51}	January 16, 2001
(253601) 2003 UU_{13}	October 16, 2003
(256776) 2008 CF_{5}	February 4, 2008
(257596) 1999 RT_{45}	September 8, 1999
(263849) 2009 BL_{83}^{[1]}	January 31, 2009
(265080) 2003 SY_{170}	September 23, 2003
(267346) 2001 WC_{16}	November 23, 2001
(270994) 2002 XV_{39}	December 9, 2002
(271152) 2003 SO_{170}	December 22, 2003
276681 Loremaes^{[4]}	December 18, 2003
(281759) 2009 BC_{133}	September 21, 2005
(284895) 2009 SW_{168}	September 23, 2009
(285888) 2001 PO_{29}	August 13, 2001
(287248) 2002 TW_{69}	October 9, 2002
(290162) 2005 RC_{5}	September 7, 2005
(290171) 2005 RY_{25}	September 8, 2005
(298162) 2002 TO_{67}	October 6, 2002
(298404) 2003 SD_{269}	September 25, 2003
(303464) 2005 CZ_{25}	February 5, 2005
310273 Paulsmeyers^{[4]}	September 8, 2004
(313655) 2003 SZ_{170}	September 23, 2003
(317821) 2003 SP_{276}	September 30, 2003
(325330) 2008 JK_{24}	May 7, 2008
(331556) 2000 XE_{54}	December 15, 2000
(331557) 2000 YZ_{14}	December 20, 2000
331605 Guidogryseels	December 10, 2001
(332760) 2009 UQ_{81}	January 12, 2005
(335337) 2005 SM	September 22, 2005
(337296) 2000 XS_{53}	December 5, 2000
(338600) 2003 ST_{170}	September 21, 2003
(354083) 2001 WB_{16}	November 23, 2001
(354352) 2003 GR_{28}	April 7, 2003
(360764) 2005 AH_{49}	December 16, 2004
(368683) 2005 RB_{5}	September 6, 2005
368704 Roelgathier	September 21, 2005
374715 Dimpourbaix	September 19, 2006
(381444) 2008 QV_{32}^{[1]}	August 30, 2008
(382118) 2011 HX_{56}	December 21, 2000
(382722) 2002 XR_{90}	December 3, 2002
383067 Stoofke	September 7, 2005
385205 Michelvancamp	September 21, 1999
390848 Veerle^{[4]}	September 8, 2004
391257 Wilwheaton	September 12, 2006
(409270) 2004 RP_{23}	September 7, 2004
413033 Aerts	December 4, 2000
(455444) 2003 SX_{170}	September 23, 2003
(497284) 2005 SO	September 22, 2005
^{1} with E. W. Elst^{2} with H. M. J. Boffin^{3} with S. I. Ipatov^{4} with P. De Cat
