= Tychonoff cube =

In mathematics, more specifically in general topology, the Tychonoff cube is the generalization of the unit cube from the product of a finite number of unit intervals to the product of an infinite, even uncountable number of unit intervals. The Tychonoff cube is named after Andrey Tychonoff, who first considered the arbitrary product of topological spaces and who proved in the 1930s that the Tychonoff cube is compact. Tychonoff later generalized this to the product of collections of arbitrary compact spaces. This result is now known as Tychonoff's theorem and is considered one of the most important results in general topology.

== Definition ==
Let $I$ denote the unit interval $[0,1]$. Given a cardinal number $\kappa \geq \aleph_0$, we define a Tychonoff cube of weight $\kappa$ as the space $I^\kappa$ with the product topology, i.e. the product $\prod_{s\in S} I_s$ where $\kappa$ is the cardinality of $S$ and, for all $s\in S$, $I_s = I$.

The Hilbert cube, $I^{\aleph_0}$, is a special case of a Tychonoff cube.

== Properties ==
The axiom of choice is assumed throughout.

- The Tychonoff cube is compact.
- Given a cardinal number $\lambda \leq \kappa$, the space $I^\lambda$ is embeddable in $I^\kappa$.
- The Tychonoff cube $I^\kappa$ is a universal space for every compact space of weight $\kappa \geq \aleph_0$.
- The Tychonoff cube $I^\kappa$ is a universal space for every Tychonoff space of weight $\kappa \geq \aleph_0$.
- The character of $x\in I^\kappa$ is $\kappa$.
- All Tychonoff spaces are homeomorphic to a subspace of a Tychonoff cube (known as the Embedding Theorem in some texts).

== See also ==
- Tychonoff plank – the topological product of the two ordinal spaces $[0,\omega_1]$ and $[0,\omega]$, where $\omega$ is the first infinite ordinal and $\omega_1$ the first uncountable ordinal
- Long line (topology) – a generalization of the real line from a countable number of line segments [0, 1) laid end-to-end to an uncountable number of such segments.
- Maharam's theorem - a statement that complete measure spaces can be decomposed into unit intervals and discrete parts.
