= Andrey Tikhonov =

Andrey Tikhonov may refer to:

- Andrey Tikhonov (footballer) (born 1970), Russian football manager and footballer
- Andrey Tikhonov (mathematician) (1906–1993), Soviet Russian mathematician and geophysicist
- Andrey Tikhonov (runner) (born 1966), Soviet Russian long-distance runner
