= Tasha the Amazon =

Canadian rapper

- Born: Tasha Schumann; Kitchener, Ontario, Canada
- Genres: Rap, Hip hop, Trap, R&B
- Occupations: Rapper, music producer, singer, songwriter, television presenter, author
- Instruments: Vocals, piano
- Years active: 2013–present

Tasha the Amazon, born Tasha Schumann, is a Canadian rapper, singer-songwriter, hip hop producer, author, and host to the Animalogic YouTube channel. She is best known for her debut EP Die Every Day, which was nominated at the 2017 Juno Awards for Rap Recording of the Year.

== Biography ==
Born to German and Jamaican parents, she was raised in Kitchener, Ontario. She is the niece of Juno Award winner Erroll Starr, a rhythm and blues singer prominent in the 1980s.

She moved to Toronto after high school, studying psychology at the University of Toronto, where she launched her music career.

== Career ==
She released a number of solo singles between 2013 and 2015, including a mixtape called FIDIYOOTDEM before releasing her debut album Die Every Day in 2016. In 2017 she was nominated for a Juno Award for Rap Album of the year. Later that year, she won the MuchMusic Video Award for Best Hip Hop Video for "Picasso Leaning", the first female artist ever to win that award.

She collaborated with Danger for a track on his debut album 太鼓 (2017).

She released her second album, Black Moon in 2019.

In November 2020, she starred on Animalogic's YouTube channel. She hosts the Floralogic episodes where she talks about different types of plants and fungi.

== Discography ==
=== Studio albums ===
| Year | Album title | Album details |
|---|---|---|
| 2016 | Die Every Day | Released: November 11, 2016; Label: Hot Steam Entertainment; Formats: Digital download |
| 2019 | Black Moon | Released: November 12, 2019; Label: Hot Steam Entertainment; Formats: Digital download |
