= TECO =

TECO or Teco may refer to:

== Organisations ==
- Taipei Economic and Cultural Representative Office, a Taiwan representative office alternative to an embassy
- TECO Maritime, an international producer and supplier of cleaning systems for ships
- TECO Electric and Machinery, a Taiwanese company in electric motor, electric appliances and other businesses worldwide
- TECO Energy, an American electrical power company
- Technical Education Center Osceola, a secondary school in unincorporated Osceola County, Florida, US
- Telecooperation Office, a German research group in the field of pervasive Computing at the Karlsruhe Institute of Technology

== Other uses ==
- TECO (text editor) ("Text Editor and Corrector", originally Tape Editor and Corrector), an early computer text editor
- TECO Line Streetcar, a streetcar line in Tampa, Florida, US
- Teco pottery, produced by American Terra Cotta Tile and Ceramic Company
- Teco (footballer) (born 1982), Brazilian footballer Wender Coelho da Silva

== See also ==
- Tecos F.C., a Mexican football club
- Los TECOS, secret society in Mexico
