= Alexander Tikhonov (disambiguation) =

Alexander Tikhonov (born 1947) is a Russian biathlete.

Alexander Tikhonov may also refer to:

- Oleksandr Tikhonov (1938–2019), Ukrainian pharmacist
- Alexandre Tichonov (born 1962), Russian rugby union player
- Aleksandr Tikhonov (footballer) (born 1963), Russian footballer
- Alexander Tikhonov (swimmer) (born 1988), Russian swimmer
- Alexander Tikhonov (publisher) (1880–1956), Russian writer and publisher
