= Vasily Tikhonov =

Vasily Tikhonov may refer to:

- Vasily Tikhonov (rower) (born 1960), Soviet rower
- Vasily Tikhonov (equestrian) (1909–1987), Soviet equestrian
- Vasily Tikhonov (ice hockey) (1958–2013), Russian ice hockey coach
