= Viktor Tikhonov =

Viktor or Victor Tikhonov may refer to:

- Viktor Tikhonov (politician) (1949–2020), Ukrainian politician, member of parliament and former ambassador
- Viktor Tikhonov (ice hockey, born 1930) (1930–2014), Soviet ice hockey player and coach
- Viktor Tikhonov (ice hockey, born 1988), Russian ice hockey player, grandson of Viktor Vasilyevich Tikhonov (1930–2014)
