= Helena Knyazeva =

Russian philosopher

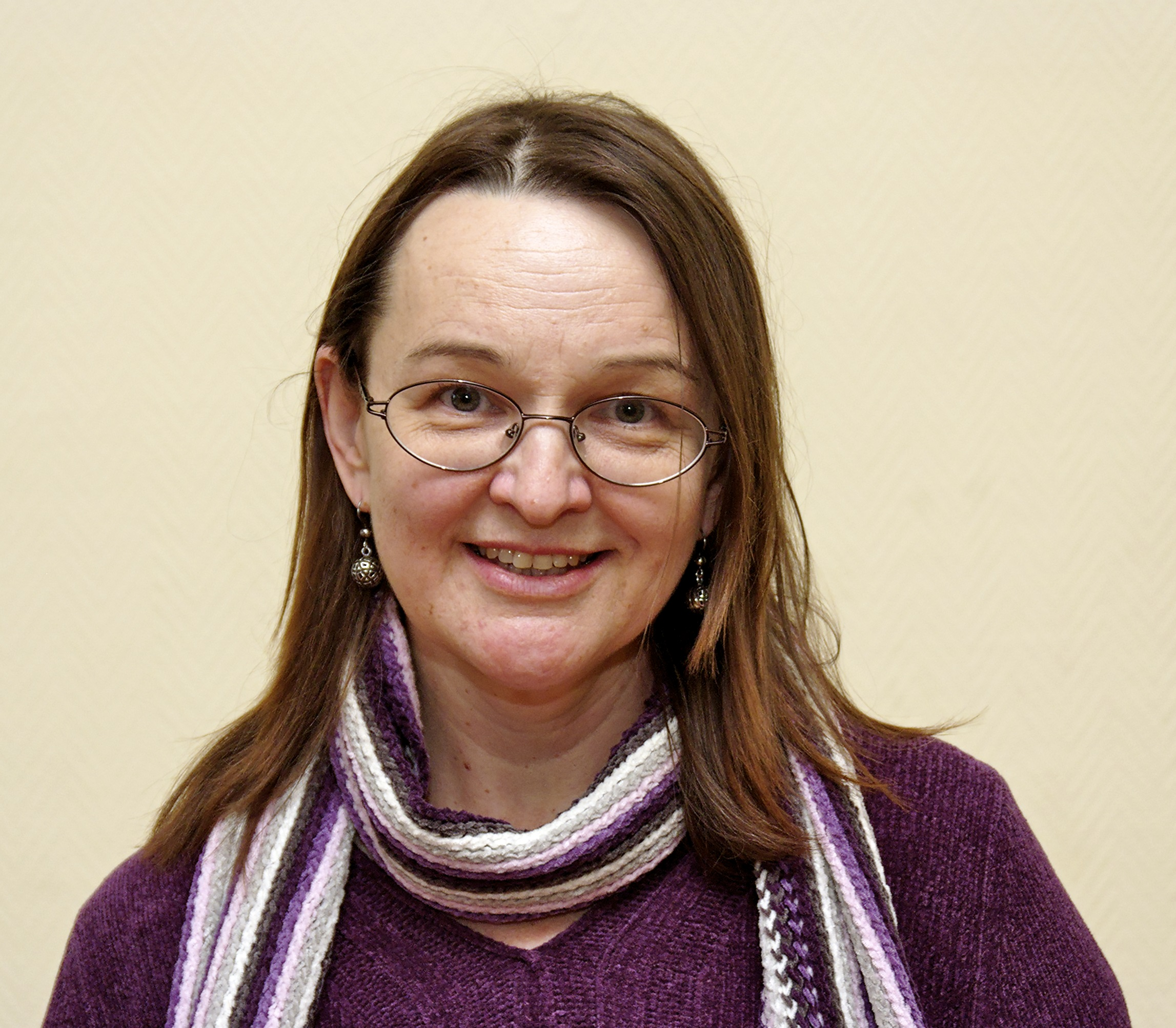
- Born: 23 December 1959 (age 66); Moscow, Soviet Union
- Citizenship: Russian Federation
- Education: Moscow State Pedagogical University
- Known for: Philosophy of science, Complex systems, Epistemology
- Scientific career
- Fields: Philosophy
- Workplaces: Institute of Philosophy, Higher School of Economics

Helena Nikolaevna Knyazeva (Russian: Елена Николаевна Князева, born 23 December 1959) is a Russian philosopher of science, complex systems scientist, scholar of synergetics, and translator into Russian of the works of Ilya Prigogine, Edgar Morin, and others. She is a professor at the Higher School of Economics in Moscow.

== Education and career ==
Knyazeva was born 23 December 1959 in Moscow.

She was a student at the Moscow State Pedagogical University, studying physics, astronomy, and philosophy there and graduating in 1982 with an honors degree in physics. She earned a candidate degree (equivalent to Ph.D.) in 1985 through the Institute of Philosophy of the Academy of Sciences of the Soviet Union, and completed a doctor of sciences degree (habilitation) in 1995 through the same institute.

She worked as a researcher in the Institute of Philosophy for over 30 years, and from 2008 to 2013 headed the department of evolutionary epistemology there. She has been affiliated with the Higher School of Economics since 2013.

== Recognition ==
Knyazeva was elected to the International Academy for Systems and Cybernetic Sciences in 2016, as its youngest member and first Russian member.
