= Tyco =

Tyco may refer to:

- Tyco International, a diversified industrial conglomerate
  - TE Connectivity, formerly Tyco Electronics, a former segment of Tyco International
  - Tyco Solarlok, a type of electrical connector widely known as "the Tyco connector"
- Tyco Toys, a division of Mattel
- Tyco Federal Credit Union, a credit union for employees of Tyco International, TE Connectivity and Covidien
- Ty Inc., maker of Beanie Babies

== See also ==
- Taiko (disambiguation)
- Tycho (disambiguation)
