= Alexander Samarskii =

Russian mathematician (1919–2008)

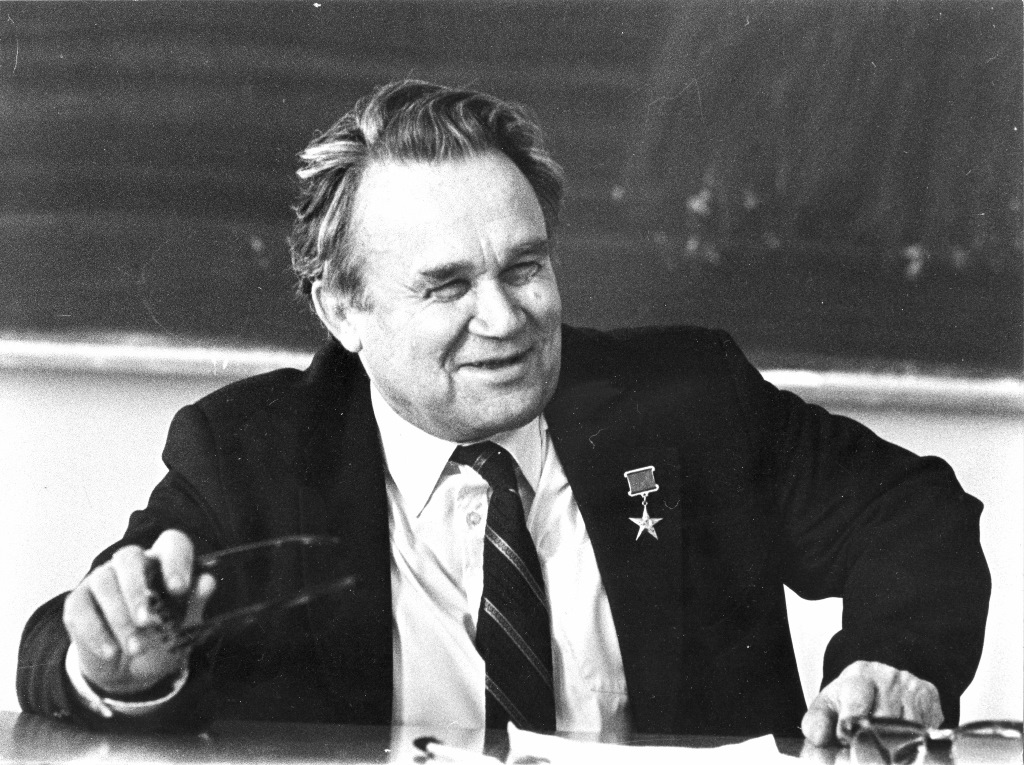
Alexander Andreevich Samarskii

Alexander Andreyevich Samarskii (Russian: Александр Андреевич Самарский; 19 February 1919, Amvrosiivka, metropolitan Donetsk, Yekaterinoslav Governorate – 11 February 2008, Moscow) was a Soviet and Russian mathematician and academician (Academy of Sciences of the Soviet Union, Russian Academy of Sciences), specializing in mathematical physics, applied mathematics, numerical analysis, mathematical modeling, finite difference methods.

== Education and career ==
Born in Amvrosiivka, Yekaterinoslav Governorate, Russian Empire (now, Donetsk Oblast, Ukraine). Samarskii studied from 1936 at Moscow State University, interrupted from 1941 to 1944 by voluntary military service in WW II — he was severely wounded in the Battle of Moscow. In 1948 he received his Russian candidate degree (Ph.D.). At the same time, he worked with Andrey Tikhonov on mathematical modeling of nuclear weapon explosions and electromagnetic fields in waveguides. In the 1950s Samarskii worked on finite difference methods and became the founder of a Soviet school in this field. In 1957 he received his Russian doctorate (higher doctoral degree) at the Keldysh Institute of Applied Mathematics with a dissertation on the solution of nonlinear problems of mathematics using finite difference methods. He was elected in 1966 a corresponding member and in 1976 a full member of the Russian Academy of Sciences. He was in 1953 a department head at the Institute of Applied Mathematics of the Soviet Academy of Sciences and a professor at Moscow State University, where he also received an honorary professorship. He founded the Department of Computational Modeling in the Faculty of Numerical Mathematics of Moscow State University and the Department of Mathematical Modelling at the Moscow Institute of Physics and Technology. From 1991 to 1998 he headed the Institute of Mathematical Modelling of the Russian Mathematical Modeling Committee (the Russian part of the International Association for Mathematics and Computers in Simulation (IMACS)).

Samarskii received numerous honors and awards for his work, including the Hero of Socialist Labour (1979) and received the Lenin Prize (1962), the USSR State Prize (1965), the State Prize of the Russian Federation (1999), and the Lomonosov Prize of Moscow State University (1997). He was an Invited Speaker of the ICM in Vancouver in 1974 and in 1978 in Helsinki. He was elected in 1985 a foreign member of the Akademie der Wissenschaften der DDR, the National Academy of Sciences of Belarus, and the National Academy of Sciences of Ukraine.

== Research ==
Samarskii is the founder of the national mathematical modeling, the leading expert in the field of computational mathematics, mathematical physics, theory of difference schemes, numerical simulation of complex nonlinear systems. He is the creator of the theory of operator-difference schemes, general theory of stability of difference schemes. Samarskii achieved fundamental results in finite difference methods, for example, finite difference methods applied to stability theory, the application of grid approximations to equations of mathematical physics (including non-classical problems and non-linear equations such as in chaotic diffusion), and methods for solving lattice equations. Samarskii and his students developed analytic and numerical methods for solving problems in nuclear physics, plasma physics, nuclear fusion, magnetohydrodynamics, gas dynamics, hydrodynamics with radiation interaction, laser thermochemistry, convection, ecology, and autocatalytic chemical reactions. Samarskii had over 100 doctoral students and his students include three academicians and five corresponding members of the Russian Academy of Sciences.

== Selected publication ==
- Theorie der Differenzenverfahren. Leipzig, 1984, Academische Verlagsgessellschaft, 356 p.
- The theory of difference schemes. New York – Basel. Marcel Dekker, Inc, 2001, pp. 761.
- with A. N. Tikhonov: Differentialgleichungen der Mathematischen Physik (series Hochschulbücher für Mathematik. vol. 39). Deutscher Verlag der Wissenschaften, Berlin 1959, English transliteration: Equations of Mathematical Physics, Pergamon Press, Oxford-London-NY-Paris, 1963, Dover 1990
- with B. M. Budak, A. N. Tikhonov: A collection of problems of mathematical physics. Pergamon Press 1964, New York, Dover Publications. Inc., 1988, 768 pp. ISBN 0-486-65806-6
- with A. N. Tikhonov: Partial differential equations of mathematical physics. 2 vols. Holden-Day, San Francisco 1964, 1967.
- with Evgenii S. Nikolaev: Numerical methods for grid equations. 2 vols. Birkhäuser, 1989.
- with Galactionov V.A and co.Blow-up in quasilinear parabolic equations. Walter de Gruyte Berlin, NY, 1995, 534 p. ISBN 3-11- 012754-7.
- with P.N. Vabishchevich: Computational heat transfer. 2 vols. Chichester, Wiley. 1995.
- with A. P. Mikhailov: Principles of mathematical modeling: ideas, methods and examples. London and New York. Taylor and Francis, 2002, 349 c. ISBN 0 -415-27280-7.
- with P. P. Matus, P.N. Vabishchevich: Difference methods with operator factors. Kluwer Academic Publishers,
- with P.N. Vabishchevich:Numerical methods for solving inverse problems of mathematical physics. Walter de Gruyte Berlin, NY de Gruyter, 2007.
