= Tycho =

Tycho is a masculine given name, a latinization of Greek Τύχων, from the name of Tyche (Ancient Greek: Τύχη), the Greek goddess of fortune or luck. The Russian form of the name is Tikhon (Тихон).

== People ==
=== Given name ===
- Tycho Brahe (1546–1601), Danish nobleman and astronomer
- Saint Tikhon of Zadonsk (1724–1783), Russian bishop
- Tycho van Meer (born 1974), Dutch field hockey striker

=== Surname ===
- Tommy Tycho (1928–2013), Hungarian-Australian pianist, conductor, composer

=== Pseudonym ===
- Tycho (musician) (born 1977) (Scott Hansen), American ambient music artist and producer, also known as ISO50

== Astronomy ==
- Tycho (lunar crater)
- Tycho Brahe (Martian crater)
- The Tycho-1 Catalogue or Tycho-2 Catalogue of stars
- SN 1572, a supernova remnant, often called Tycho's supernova
- Tycho G, the companion star of SN 1572
- 1677 Tycho Brahe, an asteroid

== Fiction ==
- Tycho, a desert ranger henchman from the computer game Fallout
- Tycho, a shipboard AI in the computer game Marathon
- Tycho Brahe, a character from the Penny Arcade webcomic based on writer Jerry Holkins
- Tycho Celchu, a character in the Star Wars Universe
- Tycho Zeling, protagonist of Edward van de Vendel's young adult novel Days of Bluegrass Love and its sequels.
- Brother-Captain Tycho, a character in the Warhammer 40,000 universe
- Tycho City, a city located on Earth's moon (presumably on/near Tycho Crater), mentioned in the Star Trek franchise
- Tycho Station, a setting in The Expanse novel series and its accompanying TV series

== See also ==
- Tyco (disambiguation)
- Taiko (disambiguation)
