= Taiko (album) =

太鼓

Studio album by Danger
- Released: 2017
- Genre: Electro, witch house, hip hop, synthwave
- Label: 1789

Danger chronology
July 2013 (2014)	太鼓 (2017)

太鼓 (pronounced Taiko) is the debut album by French musician Danger. It was released in 2017.

== Track listing ==
1. 1789 Records
2. 7:17
3. 11:02
4. 11:03
5. 22:41
6. 19:00 feat. Tasha the Amazon
7. 9:00
8. 6:42
9. 10:00
10. 0:59
11. 11:50 feat. Lil Brain
12. 21:10
13. 19:19
14. 8:10
15. 3:00
