= Tikhon =

Tikhon (Russian: Ти́хон, Ukrainian: Ти́хон, Ти́хін, Polish: Tychon) is a Slavic male given name of Greek origin, related to Western European Tycho.

- Tikhon Bernstam (born 1979), American Internet entrepreneur
- Tikhon Chicherin (1869–1904), Russian entomologist
- Tikhon Dzyadko (born 1987), Russian journalist
- Tikhon Khrennikov (1913–2007), Soviet composer
- Tikhon Kiselyov (1917–1983), Soviet Belarusian statesman
- Tikhon Moiseev (born 1978), Russian mathematician
- Tikhon Streshnev (1649–1719), Russian nobleman and statesman
- Tikhon Zhiznevsky (born 1988), Russian stage actor

Religious figures:

- Patriarch Tikhon of Moscow (1865–1925)
- Tikhon Mollard (born 1966)
- Tikhon (Shevkunov) (born 1958)
- Tikhon (Zaitsev) (born 1967)
- Tikhon of Kaluga (ca. 1400–1492)
- Tikhon of Zadonsk (1724–1783)
- Tikhon of Amathus (d. 425)

== See also ==
- Eastern Slavic naming customs
- Liturgy of Saint Tikhon
