= Timur Eneev =

Russian mathematician (1924–2019)

- Тимур Энеев
- Eneev in 1998
- Born: Timur Magomedovich Eneev; September 23, 1924; Grozny, Russia
- Died: September 8, 2019 (aged 94); Moscow, Russia

Timur Magomedovich Eneev (September 23, 1924 – September 8, 2019) was a Russian mathematician specializing in mechanics and control processes. A minor planet Eneev discovered in 1978 is named after him. He was the editor-in-chief of the journal Cosmic Research. He was a member of the Balkar ethnic group.

== Biography ==
In 1948 Eneev graduated from the Moscow State University and until 1953 worked as a research worker at the Steklov Institute of Mathematics. Since 1953 he is associated with the Keldysh Institute of Applied Mathematics. He became a member of the CPSU since 1957 and a corresponding member of the USSR Academy of Sciences in 1968.

Eneev received the Lenin Prize in 1957 and has been awarded the Order of Lenin and the Order of the Red Banner of Labour. In 2006 he was awarded the prestigious Demidov Prize of the Russian Academy of Sciences in mathematics.
