= Tikhonov's theorem (dynamical systems) =

In applied mathematics, Tikhonov's theorem on dynamical systems is a result on stability of solutions of systems of differential equations. It has applications to chemical kinetics. The theorem is named after Andrey Nikolayevich Tikhonov.

== Statement ==
Consider this system of differential equations:

$$\begin{align}
\frac{d\mathbf{x}}{dt} & = \mathbf{f}(\mathbf{x},\mathbf{z},t), \\
\mu\frac{d\mathbf{z}}{dt} & = \mathbf{g}(\mathbf{x},\mathbf{z},t).
\end{align}$$

Taking the limit as $\mu\to 0$, this becomes the "degenerate system":

$$\begin{align}
\frac{d\mathbf{x}}{dt} & = \mathbf{f}(\mathbf{x},\mathbf{z},t), \\
\mathbf{z} & = \varphi(\mathbf{x},t),
\end{align}$$

where the second equation is the solution of the algebraic equation

$$\mathbf{g}(\mathbf{x},\mathbf{z},t) = 0.$$

Note that there may be more than one such function $\varphi$.

Tikhonov's theorem states that as $\mu\to 0,$ the solution of the system of two differential equations above approaches the solution of the degenerate system if $\mathbf{z} = \varphi(\mathbf{x},t)$ is a stable root of the "adjoined system"

$$\frac{d\mathbf{z}}{dt} = \mathbf{g}(\mathbf{x},\mathbf{z},t).$$
