= TICO (codec) =

Video compression technology

The TICO codec, an abbreviation for "Tiny Codec," is a video compression technology created to facilitate the transmission of high-resolution video over existing network infrastructures, including both IP networks and SDI infrastructures, with the results appearing visually lossless. TICO codec was represented in 2013 by the Belgian company intoPIX.

== Key features ==
- Provides visually lossless quality with compression ratios up to 4:1.
- Supports a range of chroma subsampling formats, such as 4:2:2, 4:4:4, and offers 8, 10, or 12 bits flexibility in color depth.
- Provides options for both constant bitrate (CBR) and variable bitrate (VBR) encoding.
- Compatible with different resolutions, starting from mobile devices and HD to 4K/8K UHDTV.
- Encoder and decoder exhibit comparable levels of complexity.
- Ensures fixed latency, adaptable from microseconds to a chosen number of pixel lines.
- Has a low complexity codec design, supporting direct implementation in FPGA hardware, with minimal internal memory requirements, thus avoiding the need for external memory.
- For a 4K image, it divides the image into 34 sections, each measuring 3840 x 64 pixels, which are afterwards individually processed during the encoding and decoding phases.

== Key products based on TICO technology ==
=== TICO XS ===
TICO XS compression technology offers a range of quality settings from mathematically lossless to visually lossless, then near-lossless, and lossy compression that can achieve a bitrate as low as 1 bit per pixel (bpp). TICO achieves near-zero latency, processing images within mere fractions of a millisecond, equating to only a few lines of pixels. The technology supports a different variety of resolutions, including HD and 4K, with capabilities extending up to 8192x4320 pixels, also higher resolutions, at different frame rate. TICO XS supports HDR and a range of bit depths from 8 to 16 bits.

Formats	TICO-XS	TICO-RDD35	IP networks & SDI mapping examples
8K 4320p60	2 Gbps - 6,4 Gbps	~8 Gbps	1 to 4 streams over 10 GbE (CAT 6) Single 3G/6G/12G-SDI
8K 4320p120	4 Gbps - 12,8 Gbps		1 to 2 streams over 10 GbE (CAT 6) Single 6G/12G-SDI

=== TICO RAW ===
TicoRAW is a proprietary, licensed codec for compressing a camera's raw sensor data, enabling it to achieve low latency, with delays as minimal as 32 video lines. It optimises software encoders and decoders to make use of modern multi-core CPUs and GPUs, allowing them to effectively use multiple sub-processors. TICO RAW seamlessly handles multi-core processing, allowing tasks to be split into numerous simultaneous operations without being limited to specific processing order. . In 2021, Y.M.Cinema reported that Nikon’s Z9 uses TicoRAW to enable high‑efficiency 8K/60p RAW video recording by reducing RAW data bitrate “by a factor of 10 without impairing the quality.” According to Nikon’s technical documentation, the N‑RAW codec used by the Z9 for video uses intoPIX technology.

=== TICO RDD35 ===
TICO RDD35 compression standard was created for transmission of 4K and 8K video content over networks with minimal latency. It uses visually lossless compression to save bandwidth without losing video quality, helping existing infrastructure support high-resolution broadcasts. This fact makes TICO RDD35 suitable for live broadcasting.

=== TICO XS-FIP ===
TICO XS FIP codec supports high-quality AV distribution in 4K and 8K. It allows 4K and 8K transmission over IP networks via Cat5e cables or wireless links with minimal latency and a small impact on AMD platforms. This technology finds use in wireless AV, displays, KVM, AV-over-IP, and gaming, providing reliable performance for long-term AV workflows.
