= Andrey Tikhonov (mathematician) =

Soviet mathematician (1906–1993)

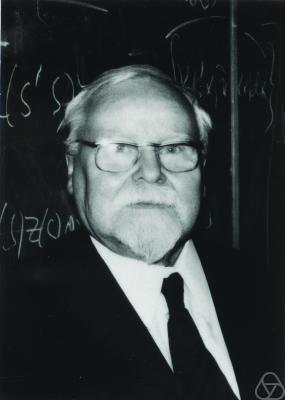
- Tikhonov in 1975
- Born: 17 October 1906; Gzhatsk, Russian Empire
- Died: 7 October 1993 (aged 86); Moscow, Russia
- Education: Moscow State University
- Known for: Important contributions to topology, functional analysis, mathematical physics, ill-posed problems; Tychonoff spaces, Tychonoff's theorem, Tikhonov regularization, Tikhonov's theorem (dynamical systems), magnetotellurics geophysical method.
- Scientific career
- Fields: Mathematics
- Workplaces: Moscow State University
- Doctoral advisor: Pavel Alexandrov
- Doctoral students: Aleksandr Andreyevich Samarskiĭ; Alexei Georgievich Sveshnikov

Andrey Nikolayevich Tikhonov (Russian: Андре́й Никола́евич Ти́хонов; 17 October 1906 – 7 October 1993) was a leading Soviet Russian mathematician and geophysicist known for important contributions to topology, functional analysis, mathematical physics, and ill-posed problems. He was also one of the inventors of the magnetotellurics method in geophysics. Other transliterations of his surname include "Tychonoff", "Tychonov", "Tihonov", "Tichonov".

== Biography ==
Born in Gzhatsk, he studied at the Moscow State University where he received a Ph.D. in 1927 under the direction of Pavel Sergeevich Alexandrov. In 1933 he was appointed as a professor at Moscow State University. He became a corresponding member of the USSR Academy of Sciences on 29 January 1939 and a full member of the USSR Academy of Sciences on 1 July 1966.

== Research work ==
Tikhonov worked in a number of different fields in mathematics. He made important contributions to topology, functional analysis, mathematical physics, and certain classes of ill-posed problems. Tikhonov regularization, one of the most widely used methods to solve ill-posed inverse problems, is named in his honor. He is best known for his work on topology, including the metrization theorem he proved in 1926, and the Tychonoff's theorem, which states that every product of arbitrarily many compact topological spaces is again compact. In his honor, completely regular topological spaces are also named Tychonoff spaces.

In mathematical physics, he proved the fundamental uniqueness theorems for the heat equation and studied Volterra integral equations.

He founded the theory of asymptotic analysis for differential equations with small parameter in the leading derivative.

== Organizer work ==
Tikhonov played the leading role in founding the Faculty of Computational Mathematics and Cybernetics of Moscow State University and served as its first dean during the period of 1970–1990.

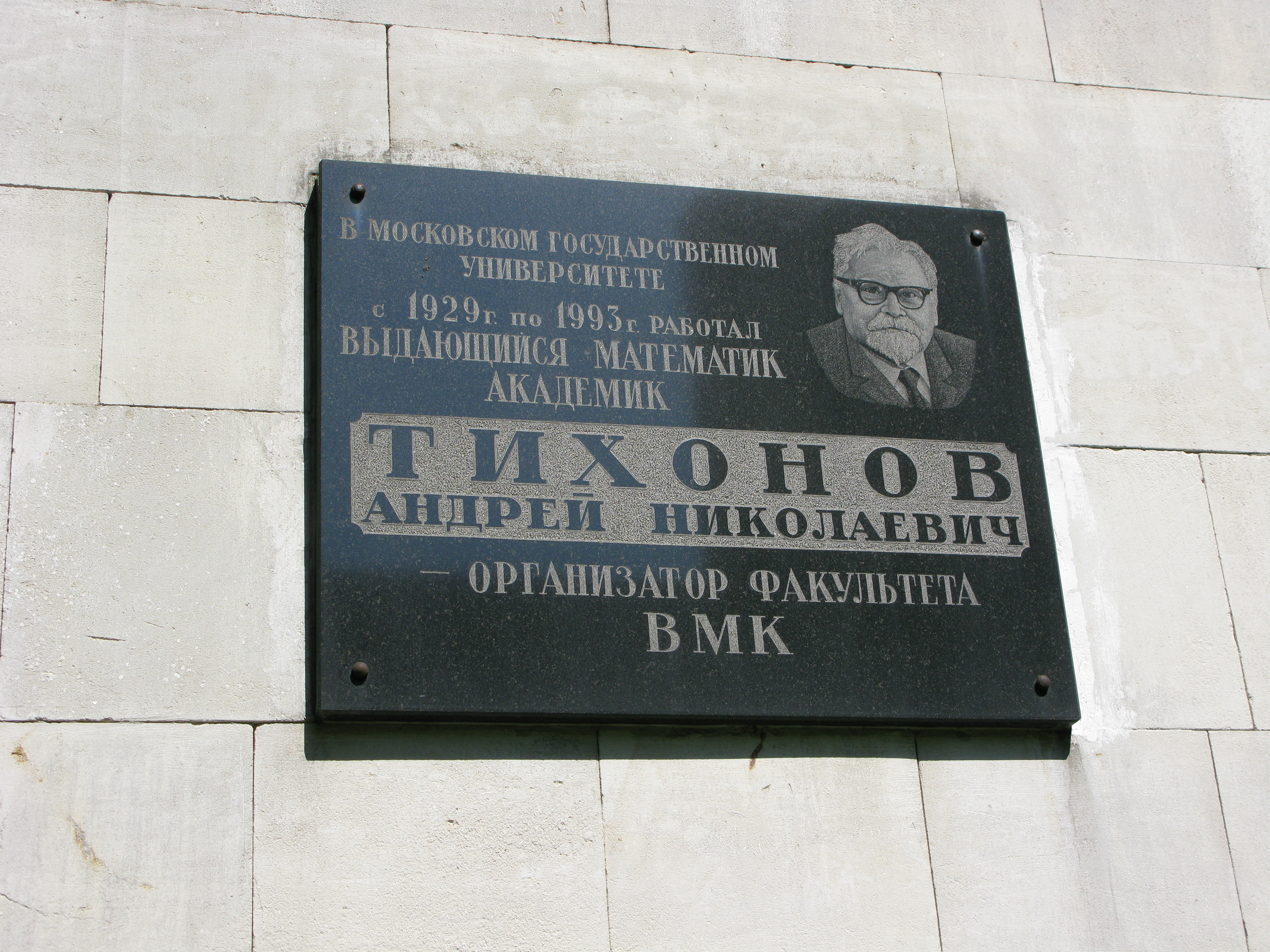
Memorial board of A.N. Tikhonov on the MSU Second Humanities Building where the Faculty of Computational Mathematics and Cybernetics is located

== Awards ==
Tikhonov received numerous honors and awards for his work, including the Lenin Prize (1966) and the Hero of Socialist Labor (1954, 1986).

== Publications ==
=== Books ===
- Sveshnikov, A. G.; Tikhonov, A. N. (1978). The Theory of Functions of a Complex Variable. Mir. (English translation.)
- Tikhonov, A. N.; Arsenin, V. Y. (1977). Solutions of Ill-Posed Problems. New York: Winston. ISBN 0-470-99124-0.
- Tikhonov, A. N.; Goncharsky, A. V. (1987). Ill-posed Problems in the Natural Sciences. Oxford: Oxford University Press. ISBN 0-8285-3739-9.
- A. N., Tikhonov; Samarskii, A. A. (2013) [1990]. Equations of Mathematical Physics. Dover. ISBN 978-0-48-617336-8.
- Tikhonov, A. N.; Goncharsky, A. V.; Stepanov, V. V.; Yagola, A. G. (1995). Numerical Methods for the Solution of Ill-Posed Problems. Dordrecht: Kluwer. ISBN 0-7923-3583-X.
- Tikhonov, A. N.; Leonov, A. S.; Yagola, A. G. (1998). Nonlinear Ill-Posed Problems. Vol. 1–2. London, Weinheim, New York, Tokyo, Melbourne, Madras: Chapman and Hall. ISBN 0-412-78660-5.

=== Papers ===
- Tikhonov, A. N.; Samarskii, A. A. (1962). "Homogeneous difference schemes". USSR Computational Mathematics and Mathematical Physics. 1: 5–67. doi:10.1016/0041-5553(62)90005-8.
- Tikhonov, A. N.; Samarskii, A. A. (1963). "Homogeneous difference schemes on non-uniform nets" (PDF). USSR Computational Mathematics and Mathematical Physics. 2 (5): 927–953. doi:10.1016/0041-5553(63)90505-6.
- Tikhonov, A. N. (1966). "On the stability of the functional optimization problem". USSR Computational Mathematics and Mathematical Physics. 6 (4): 28–33. doi:10.1016/0041-5553(66)90003-6.

== See also ==
- Regularization
- Stone–Čech compactification
- Tikhonov cube
- Tikhonov distribution
- Tikhonov plank
- Tikhonov space
- Tikhonov's theorem on dynamical systems
