= 2005 PFC CSKA Moscow season =

PFC CSKA Moscow
2005 season
- Manager: Valery Gazzaev
- Russian Premier League: 1st
- 2004–05 Russian Cup: Winners
- 2005–06 Russian Cup: Progressed to 2006 season
- 2004–05 UEFA Cup: Winners
- 2005–06 UEFA Cup: Group stage
- UEFA Super Cup: Runners-up
- Top goalscorer: League: Ivica Olić (10); All: Daniel Carvalho (15)
Home colours	Away colours

The 2005 Russian football season, saw CSKA Moscow competed in the Russian Premier League, Russian Cup, two editions of the UEFA Cup and the UEFA Super Cup. CSKA won the Russian Premier League, Russian Cup and the 2004–05 UEFA Cup, earn them a historic treble. As a result of winning the UEFA Cup they faced Liverpool in the 2005 UEFA Super Cup, which they lost 3–1.

== Squad ==
As of match played 1 December 2005

Number	Name	Nationality	Position	Date of birth (age)	Signed from	Signed in	Contract ends	Apps.	Goals
Goalkeepers
1	Veniamin Mandrykin	(Russia)	GK	30 August 1981 (aged 24)	Alania Vladikavkaz	2002		65	0
35	Igor Akinfeev	(Russia)	GK	8 April 1986 (aged 19)	Academy	2003		108	0
51	Sergei Zhideyev	(Russia)	GK	2 April 1987 (aged 18)	Trudovyye Rezervy Moscow	2004		0	0
77	Vladimir Gabulov	(Russia)	GK	19 October 1983 (aged 22)	Alania Vladikavkaz	2004		0	0
Defenders
2	Deividas Šemberas	(Lithuania)	DF	2 August 1978 (aged 27)	Dynamo Moscow	2002		145	0
4	Sergei Ignashevich	(Russia)	DF	14 July 1979 (aged 26)	Lokomotiv Moscow	2004		76	8
6	Aleksei Berezutski	(Russia)	DF	20 June 1982 (aged 23)	Chernomorets Novorossiysk	2001		142	3
15	Chidi Odiah	(Nigeria)	DF	17 December 1983 (aged 21)	Sheriff Tiraspol	2004		49	3
24	Vasili Berezutski	(Russia)	DF	20 June 1982 (aged 23)	Torpedo-ZIL	2002		89	4
39	Ivan Taranov	(Russia)	DF	22 June 1986 (aged 19)	Chernomorets Novorossiysk	2002		5	0
41	Valeri Safonov	(Russia)	DF	13 May 1987 (aged 18)	Academy	2004		1	0
45	Vitaliy Denisov	(Uzbekistan)	DF	23 February 1987 (aged 18)	Sportakademklub Moscow	2003		2	0
46	Andrei Utitskikh	(Russia)	DF	12 January 1986 (aged 19)	Chernomorets Novorossiysk	2005		0	0
49	Sergei Grichenkov	(Russia)	DF	8 July 1986 (aged 19)	Academy	2002		2	0
50	Anton Grigoryev	(Russia)	DF	13 December 1985 (aged 19)	Academy	2004		1	0
57	Sergei Gorelov	(Russia)	DF	29 April 1985 (aged 20)	Academy	2001		0	0
Midfielders
7	Daniel Carvalho	(Brazil)	MF	1 March 1983 (aged 22)	Internacional	2003		68	17
8	Rolan Gusev	(Russia)	MF	17 September 1977 (aged 28)	Dynamo Moscow	2002		153	39
17	Miloš Krasić	(Serbia and Montenegro)	MF	1 November 1984 (aged 21)	Vojvodina	2004		62	3
18	Yuri Zhirkov	(Russia)	MF	20 August 1983 (aged 22)	Spartak Tambov	2004		77	10
20	Dudu	(Brazil)	MF	15 April 1983 (aged 22)	Rennes	2005		26	3
22	Evgeni Aldonin	(Russia)	MF	22 January 1980 (aged 25)	Rotor Volgograd	2004		94	4
25	Elvir Rahimić	(Bosnia and Herzegovina)	MF	4 April 1976 (aged 29)	Anzhi Makhachkala	2001		176	3
37	Kirill Kochubei	(Russia)	MF	6 October 1986 (aged 19)	Chernomorets Novorossiysk	2002		1	0
54	Aleksei Vasilyev	(Russia)	MF	28 October 1987 (aged 18)	Academy	2004		0	0
56	Vladimir Tatarchuk	(Russia)	MF	6 October 1986 (aged 19)	Academy	2004		0	0
Forwards
9	Ivica Olić	(Croatia)	FW	14 September 1979 (aged 26)	Dinamo Zagreb	2003		79	30
11	Vágner Love	(Brazil)	FW	11 June 1984 (aged 21)	Palmeiras	2004		64	27
13	Sergey Samodin	(Russia)	FW	14 February 1985 (aged 20)	Krasnodar-2000	2002		27	4
38	Sergei Pravosud	(Russia)	FW	18 February 1986 (aged 19)	Academy	2002		6	1
40	Aleksandr Salugin	(Russia)	FW	23 October 1988 (aged 17)	Krasny Oktyabr Moscow	2002		9	1
42	Dmitry Tikhonov	(Russia)	FW	13 September 1988 (aged 18)	Academy	2004		0	0
89	Vagif Javadov	(Azerbaijan)	FW	25 May 1989 (aged 17)	Academy	2004		0	0
Away on loan
10	Osmar Ferreyra	(Argentina)	MF	9 January 1983 (aged 22)	River Plate	2004		23	2
23	Sergiu Dadu	(Moldova)	FW	23 January 1981 (aged 24)	Sheriff Tiraspol	2004		4	0
38	Oleg Malyukov	(Russia)	DF	16 January 1985 (aged 20)	Academy	2001		1	0
Players who left during the season
19	Juris Laizāns	(Latvia)	MF	6 January 1979 (aged 26)	Skonto Riga	2001		109	7
26	Alexander Geynrikh	(Uzbekistan)	FW	6 October 1984 (aged 21)	Pakhtakor Tashkent	2003		5	1
28	Bohdan Shershun	(Ukraine)	DF	14 May 1981 (aged 24)	Dnipro Dnipropetrovsk	2002		81	2
36	Aleksei Nikolayev	(Russia)	MF	12 January 1985 (aged 20)	Academy	2001		1	0
44	Yevgeni Klimov	(Russia)	DF	21 January 1985 (aged 20)	Academy	2002		1	0
48	Vardan Mazalov	(Russia)	FW	14 October 1983 (aged 22)	Vityaz Podolsk	2002		1	0

=== Out on loan ===
Note: Flags indicate national team as defined under FIFA eligibility rules; some limited exceptions apply. Players may hold more than one non-FIFA nationality.

No.	Pos.	Nation	Player
10	MF	ARG	Osmar Ferreyra (at PSV Eindhoven)
23	FW	MDA	Sergiu Dadu (at Alania Vladikavkaz)

No.	Pos.	Nation	Player
38	DF	RUS	Oleg Malyukov (at Khimki)

== Transfers ==
=== Winter ===
In: Note: Flags indicate national team as defined under FIFA eligibility rules; some limited exceptions apply. Players may hold more than one non-FIFA nationality.

No.	Pos.	Nation	Player
20	MF	BRA	Dudu (from (France) Rennes)
46	DF	RUS	Andrei Utitskikh (from (Russia) Chernomorets Novorossiysk)

Out: Note: Flags indicate national team as defined under FIFA eligibility rules; some limited exceptions apply. Players may hold more than one non-FIFA nationality.

No.	Pos.	Nation	Player
5	MF	RUS	Sergei Semak (to (France) Paris Saint-Germain)
10	MF	ARG	Osmar Ferreyra (loan to (Netherlands) PSV Eindhoven)
14	FW	RUS	Dmitri Kirichenko (to (Russia) FC Moscow)
17	MF	RUS	Ruslan Nakhushev (to (Russia) Khimki, previously on loan to (Russia) Anzhi Makhachkala)
20	MF	CZE	Jiří Jarošík (to (England) Chelsea)
26	FW	UZB	Alexander Geynrikh (loan to (Uzbekistan) Pakhtakor Tashkent)
28	DF	UKR	Bohdan Shershun (loan to (Ukraine) Dnipro Dnipropetrovsk)
46	MF	RUS	Renat Yanbayev (to (Russia) Khimki)

=== Summer ===
In: Note: Flags indicate national team as defined under FIFA eligibility rules; some limited exceptions apply. Players may hold more than one non-FIFA nationality.

No.	Pos.	Nation	Player

Out: Note: Flags indicate national team as defined under FIFA eligibility rules; some limited exceptions apply. Players may hold more than one non-FIFA nationality.

No.	Pos.	Nation	Player
19	MF	LVA	Juris Laizāns (to (Russia) Torpedo Moscow)
23	FW	MDA	Sergiu Dadu (loan to (Russia) Alania Vladikavkaz)
26	FW	UZB	Alexander Geynrikh (to (Russia) Torpedo Moscow, previously on loan to (Uzbekistan) Pakhtakor Tashkent)
28	DF	UKR	Bohdan Shershun (to (Ukraine) Dnipro Dnipropetrovsk)
36	MF	RUS	Aleksei Lvovich Nikolayev (to (Russia) Presnya Moscow)
44	DF	RUS	Yevgeni Klimov (to (Kazakhstan) Alma-Ata)
48	FW	RUS	Vardan Mazalov (to (Russia) Spartak Nizhny Novgorod)

== Competitions ==
=== Russian Premier League ===
==== Results by round ====
Round	1	2	3	4	5	6	7	8	9	10	11	12	13	14	15	16	17	18	19	20	21	22	23	24	25	26	27	28	29	30
Ground	H	A	A	H	A	H	A	H	A	H	A	H	A	H	A	H	A	H	A	H	A	H	A	H	A	H	A	H	H	A
Result	D	D	D	D	W	W	L	W	W	W	W	D	D	D	L	W	W	W	L	W	W	W	W	L	W	W	W	D	D	W

Updated to match(es) played on 19 November 2005. Source: See Results
A = Away; H = Home; W = Win; D = Draw; L = Loss

==== Results ====
13 March 2005 1	CSKA Moscow	3–0	Terek Grozny	Moscow
14:00 MSK (UTC+3)	Olić 19'; Carvalho 61'; Rahimić 82'	Report	Klyuyev (yellow card) 58'	Stadium: Luzhniki Stadium; Attendance: 9,000; Referee: Yuri Klyuchnikov

20 March 2005 2	Tom Tomsk	0–0	CSKA Moscow	Tomsk
14:00 MSK (UTC+3)	Familtsev (yellow card) 10'; Medvedev (yellow card) 40'; Skrylnikov (yellow card) 78'; Shvetsov (yellow card) 90'	Report	Šemberas (yellow card) 62'	Stadium: Trud Stadium; Attendance: 14,000; Referee: A.Gonchar

3 April 2005 3	CSKA Moscow	0–0	Lokomotiv Moscow	Moscow
16:00 MSK (UTC+4)	Rahimić (yellow card) 29'	Report	Asatiani (yellow card) 17'; Lima (yellow card) 20'; Maminov (yellow card) 90'	Stadium: Luzhniki Stadium; Attendance: 22,000; Referee: S.Martynov

10 April 2005 4	CSKA Moscow	5–0	Krylia Sovetov Samara	Moscow
16:00 MSK (UTC+4)	Krasić 31'; Olić 42' (pen.), 79'; Rahimić (yellow card) 57'; Kowba 58' (o.g.); Laizāns 85'	Report	Booth (yellow card) 42'; Anyukov (yellow card) 45'; Poškus (yellow card) 51'; Kolodin (yellow card) 83'	Stadium: Dynamo Stadium; Attendance: 9,000; Referee: Igor Egorov

17 April 2005 5	Zenit St. Petersburg	1–0	CSKA Moscow	Saint Petersburg
16:00 MSK (UTC+4)	Bystrov (yellow card) 4' (goal) 54'; Radimov (yellow card) 67'; Arshavin (yellow card) 67'; Denisov (yellow card) 71'; Hagen (yellow card) 90'	Report	Gusev (yellow card) 10'; Rahimić (yellow card) 15'; Olić (yellow card) 67'	Stadium: Petrovsky Stadium; Attendance: 21,400; Referee: A.Evstigneev

22 May 2005 9	Spartak Moscow	1–3	CSKA Moscow	Moscow
19:00 MSK (UTC+4)	Boyarintsev 28'; Kováč (yellow card) 50'	Report	Aldonin 51'; Zhirkov (yellow card) 55'; V.Berezutski 60'; Olić 84' (yellow card) 84'	Stadium: Luzhniki Stadium; Attendance: 63,000; Referee: Florian Meyer

12 June 2005 11	Rubin Kazan	1–0	CSKA Moscow	Kazan
18:00 MSK (UTC+4)	Čížek 30'; Konovalov (yellow card) 71'; Scotti (yellow card) 89'	Report	Krasić (yellow card) 27'	Stadium: Tsentralnyi Stadion; Attendance: 18,200; Referee: Yuri Klyuchnikov

15 June 2005 8	CSKA Moscow	1–0	Saturn Moscow	Moscow
19:00 MSK (UTC+4)	Gusev 6'; Samodin (yellow card) 44'; Shershun (yellow card) 86'	Report	Yesipov (yellow card) 27'; Shirokov (yellow card) 30'; Bareiro (yellow card) 36'; Sabitov (yellow card) 88'; Jean (yellow card) 90'	Stadium: Dynamo Stadium; Attendance: 5,500; Referee: Vladimir Pettay

19 June 2005 12	CSKA Moscow	3–1	Amkar Perm	Moscow
17:00 MSK (UTC+4)	Krasić 7'; Gusev (yellow card) 54'; Vágner Love 74', 90+1'	Report	Sarkisyan (yellow card) 30'; Lavrik (yellow card) 51'; Didenko 48' (yellow card) 66'; Pyatibratov (yellow card) 74'	Stadium: Dynamo Stadium; Attendance: 7,800; Referee: Sergei Fursa

22 June 2005 7	Shinnik Yaroslavl	1–1	CSKA Moscow	Yaroslavl
18:30 MSK (UTC+4)	Starostyak (yellow card) 26'; Pogrebnyak 43'; Bikey (yellow card) 46'	Report	Aldonin (yellow card) 29' (red card) 37'; Šemberas (yellow card) 42'; Zhirkov (yellow card) 45' (goal) 63'; Berezutski (yellow card) 77'	Stadium: Shinnik Stadium; Attendance: 18,000; Referee: Nikolai Ivanov

25 June 2005 13	Rostov	0–2	CSKA Moscow	Rostov-on-Don
18:00 MSK (UTC+4)	Pérez (yellow card) 63'; Olenikov (yellow card) 77'	Report	Olić 52' (pen.), 61' (pen.); V.Berezutski (yellow card) 64'; Rahimić (yellow card) 82'	Stadium: Olimp – 2 Attendance: 14,000; Referee: Aleksandr Gvardis

2 July 2005 14	CSKA Moscow	2–0	Dynamo Moscow	Moscow
14:00 MSK (UTC+4)	Dudu 15' (yellow card) 32'; Olić 17' (pen.); Vágner Love (yellow card) 36'; Odiah (yellow card) 58'; Šemberas (yellow card) 65'; V.Berezutski (yellow card) 87'	Report	Shkabara (yellow card) 23'; Kolodin (yellow card) 61'; Derlei (yellow card) 75'; Tochilin (yellow card) 89'	Stadium: Dynamo Stadium; Attendance: 11,000; Referee: Aleksandr Kolobaev

9 July 2005 15	Alania Vladikavkaz	1–1	CSKA Moscow	Vladikavkaz
18:00 MSK (UTC+4)	Grujić (yellow card) 5'; Christopher (yellow card) 42'; Daraselia 52'; Burduli (yellow card) 72'; Tudor (yellow card) 80' (red card) 85'	Report	Dudu (yellow card) 27'; Vágner Love 56'; Ignashevich (yellow card) 86'	Stadium: Republican Spartak Stadium; Attendance: 25,000; Referee: A.Tyumin

17 July 2005 16	Terek Grozny	1–0	CSKA Moscow	Pyatigorsk
19:00 MSK (UTC+4)	Dzhabrailov (yellow card) 24'; Adamov 28'; Ajinjal (yellow card) 53'; Nizhegorodov (yellow card) 72'	Report	Krasić (yellow card) 44'; Olić (yellow card) 77'	Stadium: Central Stadium; Attendance: 8,000; Referee: A.Evstigneev

20 July 2005 6	CSKA Moscow	2–0	Torpedo Moscow	Moscow
19:00 MSK (UTC+4)	V.Berezutski 20' (yellow card) 34'; Odiah (yellow card) 32' (goal) 82'	Report	Spahić (yellow card) 37'; Semshov (yellow card) 69'	Stadium: Dynamo Stadium; Attendance: 7,000; Referee: Almir Kayumov

24 July 2005 17	CSKA Moscow	2–0	Tom Tomsk	Moscow
19:00 MSK (UTC+4)	Ignashevich 20'; Vágner Love 32'; A.Berezutski (yellow card) 77'	Report	Yaskovich (yellow card) 19'; Rekhtin (yellow card) 29'; Krunić (yellow card) 39'; Yanotovsky (yellow card) 75'; Skrylnikov (yellow card) 77'; Șișchin (yellow card) 83'	Stadium: Dynamo Stadium; Attendance: 7,000; Referee: Sergei Fursa

30 July 2005 18	Lokomotiv Moscow	3–2	CSKA Moscow	Moscow
14:00 MSK (UTC+4)	Khokhlov 14' (yellow card) 60'; Sennikov (yellow card) 27'; Bikey (yellow card) 34'; Sychov 41'; Lima (yellow card) 73'; Pashinin (yellow card) 74' (goal) 89'	Report	A.Berezutski 17'; Rahimić (yellow card) 38'; Olić 58'	Stadium: Lokomotiv Stadium; Attendance: 28,555; Referee: Valentin Ivanov

3 August 2005 10	CSKA Moscow	1–1	Moscow	Moscow
19:00 MSK (UTC+4)	Ignashevich (yellow card) 24'; Dudu (yellow card) 30'; Olić 90+2'	Report	Bracamonte 15' (yellow card) 28'; Biletskyi (yellow card) 32'; Kuzmin (yellow card) 66'; Budunov (yellow card) 84'; Nababkin (yellow card) 86'	Stadium: Dynamo Stadium; Attendance: 7,500; Referee: Yuri Baskakov

6 August 2005 19	Krylia Sovetov Samara	2–2	CSKA Moscow	Samara
18:00 MSK (UTC+4)	Husin 15' (pen.); Leilton (yellow card) 46'; Solomatin (yellow card) 62'; Adamu 89'	Report	Ignashevich 4'; A.Berezutski (yellow card) 42'; Gusev 43'; Carvalho (yellow card) 87'	Stadium: Metallurg Stadion; Attendance: 16,000; Referee: A.Evstigneev

10 August 2005 21	Torpedo Moscow	0–2	CSKA Moscow	Moscow
18:00 MSK (UTC+4)	Volkov (yellow card) 56'	Report	Gusev 13'; Olić 55'	Stadium: Eduard Streltsov Stadium; Attendance: 8,500; Referee: Aleksandr Kolobaev

21 August 2005 20	CSKA Moscow	1–1	Zenit St. Petersburg	Moscow
18:00 MSK (UTC+4)	Ignashevich 61' (pen.); Odiah (yellow card) 79'	Report	Hagen (yellow card) 16'; Radimov (yellow card) 45'; Škrtel 58'	Stadium: Dynamo Stadium; Attendance: 28,000; Referee: Luis Medina Cantalejo

10 September 2005 22	CSKA Moscow	2–0	Shinnik Yaroslav	Moscow
14:00 MSK (UTC+4)	Gusev 2'; Šemberas (yellow card) 55'; Dudu 90+4'	Report	Budiša (yellow card) 38'; Branco (red card) 53'; Shirko (yellow card) 60'; Kornaukhov (yellow card) 74'	Stadium: Dynamo Stadium; Attendance: 6,300; Referee: Sergey Lapochkin

18 September 2005 23	Saturn Moscow	0–1	CSKA Moscow	Moscow
18:00 MSK (UTC+4)	Džiaukštas (yellow card) 62'; Géder (yellow card) 73'	Report	Dudu 8'; Šemberas (yellow card) 35'; V.Berezutski (yellow card) 54'; Gusev (yellow card) 74'; Ignashevich (yellow card) 84'	Stadium: Saturn Stadium; Attendance: 16,500; Referee: Aleksandr Gvardis

24 September 2005 24	CSKA Moscow	1–0	Spartak Moscow	Moscow
14:00 MSK (UTC+4)	Carvalho 6'	Report	Mozart (yellow card) 11'; Rodríguez (yellow card) 45'; Vidić (yellow card) 87'	Stadium: Dynamo Stadium; Attendance: 35,000; Referee: Igor Egorov

2 October 2005 25	Moscow	0–0	CSKA Moscow	Moscow
14:00 MSK (UTC+4)	Kuzmin (yellow card) 43'; Nababkin (yellow card) 48'; Godunok (yellow card) 56' (red card) 87'; Biletskyi (yellow card) 60'; Tchuissé (yellow card) 64'	Report	Šemberas (yellow card) 40'; Samodin (yellow card) 75'	Stadium: Eduard Streltsov Stadium; Attendance: 9,200; Referee: M.Khodyrev

16 October 2005 26	CSKA Moscow	2–1	Rubin Kazan	Moscow
18:00 MSK (UTC+4)	Odiah 11'; Ignashevich 51'; Berezutski (yellow card) 82'; Carvalho (yellow card) 86'; Samodin (yellow card) 87'	Report	Bukharov 68'	Stadium: Dynamo Stadium; Attendance: 6,500; Referee: Vladimir Pettay

23 October 2005 27	Amkar Perm	0–1	CSKA Moscow	Perm
16:00 MSK (UTC+4)	Volkov (yellow card) 22'; Jankauskas (yellow card) 36'	Report	Carvalho 43'; Aldonin (yellow card) 65'; Zhirkov (yellow card) 85'	Stadium: Zvezda Stadium; Attendance: 19,100; Referee: A.Tyumin

30 October 2005 28	CSKA Moscow	2–1	FC Rostov	Moscow
18:00 MSK (UTC+3)	Zhirkov 20'; Vágner Love 25'; Berezutski (yellow card) 57'; Carvalho (yellow card) 90'	Report	Horák (yellow card) 19'; Buznikin 58'; Pérez (yellow card) 72'; Orlov (yellow card) 82'	Stadium: Dynamo Stadium; Attendance: 7,500; Referee: A.Gonchar

6 November 2005 29	Dynamo Moscow	1–2	CSKA Moscow	Moscow
14:00 MSK (UTC+3)	Frechaut (yellow card) 21'; Tanasijević (yellow card) 59'; Kolodin 90+6'	Report	A.Berezutski 55'; Ignashevich (yellow card) 72'; Carvalho 73'; Gusev (yellow card) 89'	Stadium: Arena Khimki; Attendance: 27,000; Referee: Igor Egorov

19 November 2005 30	CSKA Moscow	4–3	Alania Vladikavkaz	Moscow
14:00 MSK (UTC+3)	Ignashevich 24'; Salugin 36'; Vágner Love 66', 77'	Report	Gogniyev 38', 81', 87'; Lungu (yellow card) 71'	Stadium: Dynamo Stadium; Attendance: 10,000; Referee: Sergei Fursa

==== League table ====
Pos	Team	Pld	W	D	L	GF	GA	GD	Pts	Qualification or relegation
1	CSKA Moscow (C)	30	18	8	4	48	20	+28	62	Qualification to Champions League third qualifying round
2	Spartak Moscow	30	16	8	6	47	26	+21	56	Qualification to Champions League second qualifying round
3	Lokomotiv Moscow	30	14	14	2	41	18	+23	56	Qualification to UEFA Cup first round (Note: Since CSKA Moscow won the 2005–06 Russian Cup, and winner of the Russian Cup should advance to the First Round of UEFA Cup, the spot was awarded to 3rd-positioned team, because CSKA Moscow already qualified for UEFA Champions League. As a result, 4th-positioned team received a spot in the Second Qualifying Round of UEFA Cup, and 5th-positioned team received a spot in the Second Round of UEFA Intertoto Cup)
4	Rubin Kazan	30	14	9	7	45	31	+14	51	Qualification to UEFA Cup second qualifying round
5	FC Moscow	30	14	8	8	36	26	+10	50	Qualification to Intertoto Cup second round

Source: RFPL
Rules for classification: 1st points; 2nd matches won; 3rd goal difference; 4th head-to-head (points, matches won, goal difference, goals scored, away goals scored)
(C) Champions

=== Russian Cup ===
==== 2004–05 ====
1 March 2005 Round of 16 1st leg	FC Moscow	1–3	CSKA Moscow	Moscow
15:00 MSK (UTC+3)	Budunov (yellow card) 24'; Melyoshin (yellow card) 24'; Bracamonte 54'; Stoica (yellow card) 66'	Report	Samodin (yellow card) 44' (goal) 45'; Ignashevich (yellow card) 60'; Carvalho 62'; Zhirkov (yellow card) 64'; Gusev 90+1' (pen.)	Stadium: Eduard Streltsov Stadium; Attendance: 1,200; Referee: Almir Kayumov

5 March 2005 Round of 16 2nd leg	CSKA Moscow	3–1 (6–2 agg.)	FC Moscow	Moscow
14:00 MSK (UTC+3)	Olić 11'; Laizāns 35'; Ignashevich (yellow card) 54'; Carvalho 63'	Report	Bracamonte (yellow card) 27'; Melyoshin (yellow card) 41' (goal) 76'; Biletskyi (yellow card) 50'	Stadium: Dynamo Stadium; Attendance: 1,500; Referee: Aleksandr Kolobaev

20 April 2005 Quarter-final 1st leg	CSKA Moscow	2–1	Saturn Moscow	Moscow
MSK (UTC+4)	Laizāns 88'; Aldonin 90+3'	Report	Pavlovich 13'; Sviderskyi (yellow card) 70'	Stadium: Dynamo Stadium; Attendance: 4,000; Referee: Vladimir Pettay

10 May 2005 Quarter-final 2nd leg	Saturn Moscow	0–0 (1–2 agg.)	CSKA Moscow	Moscow
MSK (UTC+4)	Jean (yellow card) 27'; Onopko (yellow card) 68'; Yesipov (yellow card) 79'; Shirokov (yellow card) 84'; Géder (yellow card) 90'	Report	Krasić (yellow card) 19'; Aldonin (yellow card) 44'; Zhirkov (yellow card) 64'	Stadium: Saturn Stadium; Attendance: 13,000; Referee: Aleksandr Gvardis

13 May 2005 Semi-final 1st leg	Zenit St. Petersburg	1–0	CSKA Moscow	Saint Petersburg
MSK (UTC+4)	Šírl (yellow card) 9'; Škrtel (yellow card) 62'; Hagen (yellow card) 64'; Kerzhakov 71'; Arshavin (yellow card) 82'	Report	Ignashevich (yellow card) 28'; Vágner Love (yellow card) 20' (red card) 42'; Zhirkov (yellow card) 55'; V.Berezutski (yellow card) 80'; A.Berezutski (yellow card) 88'	Stadium: Petrovsky Stadium; Attendance: 15,500; Referee: Aleksandr Gonchar

25 May 2005 Semi-final 2nd leg	CSKA Moscow	2–0 (2–1 agg.)	Zenit St. Petersburg	Moscow
MSK (UTC+4)	Aldonin 11'; Carvalho 33'; Rahimić (yellow card) 43'; Akinfeev (yellow card) 90'	Report	Horshkov (yellow card) 39'; Bystrov (yellow card) 90'	Stadium: Dynamo Stadium; Attendance: 17,000; Referee: Aleksandr Yevstigneyev

29 May 2005 Final	CSKA Moscow	1–0	FC Khimki	Moscow
16:00 MSK (UTC+4)	Šemberas (yellow card) 26'; Zhirkov 68'	Report	Perov (yellow card) 63'; Priganiuc (yellow card) 87'	Stadium: Lokomotiv Stadium; Attendance: 25,000; Referee: Almir Kayumov

==== 2005–06 ====
6 July 2005 Fifth round 1st leg	CSKA Moscow	2–1	Torpedo Vladimir	Moscow
19:00 MSK (UTC+4)	Gusev (yellow card) 40' (goal) 41'; Samodin 51'; Shershun (yellow card) 58'; Laizāns (yellow card) 65'	Report	S.Kirpichnikov (yellow card) 48' (goal) 90+2'	Stadium: Dynamo Stadium; Attendance: 4,500; Referee: Vyacheslav Semenov

13 July 2005 Fifth round 2nd leg	Torpedo Vladimir	1–1 (1–3 agg.)	CSKA Moscow	Vladimir
18:00 MSK (UTC+4)	Alan Bolloyev 81'	Report	Krasić 66' (yellow card) 69'	Stadium: Torpedo Stadium; Attendance: 18,000; Referee: Yuri Kunitsa

Round 16 took place during the 2006 season.

=== UEFA Cup ===
==== 2004–05 ====
===== Knock-out stage =====
17 February 2005 Round of 32 1st leg	CSKA Moscow (Russia)	2–0	(Portugal) Benfica	Krasnodar, Russia
21:00 MSK (UTC+3)	V.Berezutski 11' (yellow card) 33'; A.Berezutski (yellow card) 43'; Vágner Love 60'	Report	Alcides (yellow card) 10'; Petit (yellow card) 31'; Geovanni (yellow card) 57'	Stadium: Kuban Stadium; Referee: Alexandru Tudor (Romania)

24 February 2005 Round of 32 2nd leg	Benfica (Portugal)	1–1 (1–3 agg.)	(Russia) CSKA Moscow	Lisbon, Portugal
23:30 MSK (UTC+3)	Fernandes (yellow card) 60'; Karadas 63'	Report	Rahimić (yellow card) 38'; Zhirkov (yellow card) 45'; Ignashevich 49'; Krasić (yellow card) 82'	Stadium: Estádio da Luz; Referee: Douglas McDonald (Scotland)

10 March 2005 Last 16 1st leg	Partizan (Serbia and Montenegro)	1–1	(Russia) CSKA Moscow	Belgrade, Serbia and Montenegro
20:00 MSK (UTC+3)	Rnić (yellow card) 68'; Tomić 83' (pen.)	Report	Krasić (yellow card) 2'; Aldonin 17'; A.Berezutski (yellow card) 33'	Stadium: Partizan Stadium; Referee: Jan Wegereef (Netherlands)

17 March 2005 Last 16 2nd leg	CSKA Moscow (Russia)	2–0 (3–1 agg.)	(Serbia and Montenegro) Partizan	Krasnodar, Russia
19:00 MSK (UTC+3)	Carvalho 68' (yellow card) 69'; Rahimić (yellow card) 80'; Vágner Love 84' (pen.)	Report	Brnović (yellow card) 14'; Djordjević (red card) 83'; Tomić (yellow card) 49' (red card) 84'	Stadium: Kuban Stadium; Referee: Gianluca Paparesta (Italy)

7 April 2005 Quarter-final 1st leg	CSKA Moscow (Russia)	4–0	(France) Auxerre	Moscow, Russia
20:30 MSK (UTC+4)	Odiah 21'; Aldonin (yellow card) 33'; Ignashevich 63' (pen.); Vágner Love 71'; Gusev 77'; A.Berezutski (yellow card) 90'	Report	Mathis (yellow card) 18'; Mignot (yellow card) 63' (red card) 83'	Stadium: Lokomotiv Stadium; Referee: Luis Medina Cantalejo (Spain)

14 April 2005 Quarter-final 2nd leg	Auxerre (France)	2–0 (2–4 agg.)	(Russia) CSKA Moscow	Auxerre, France
22:45 MSK (UTC+4)	Lachuer 9'; Mathis (yellow card) 57'; Kalou 78' (pen.); Violeau (yellow card) 78'	Report	Odiah (yellow card) 35'; Carvalho (yellow card) 49'; Aldonin (yellow card) 53'; Akinfeev (yellow card) 79'	Stadium: Stade de l'Abbé-Deschamps; Referee: Wolfgang Stark (Germany)

28 April 2005 Semi-final 1st leg	Parma (Italy)	0–0	(Russia) CSKA Moscow	Parma, Italy
23:00 MSK (UTC+4)	Bovo (yellow card) 54'; Vignaroli (yellow card) 75'	Report		Stadium: Stadio Ennio Tardini; Referee: Massimo Busacca (Switzerland)

5 May 2005 Semi-final 2nd leg	CSKA Moscow (Russia)	3–0 (3–0 agg.)	(Italy) Parma	Moscow, Russia
20:45 MSK (UTC+4)	Daniel Carvalho 10', 53'; Aldonin (yellow card) 51'; V. Berezutski 60'; Vágner Love (yellow card) 68'	Report	Camara (yellow card) 35'; Bresciano (yellow card) 69'; Bovo (yellow card) 77'; Bonera (yellow card) 81' (red card) 90'	Stadium: Lokomotiv Stadium; Referee: Alain Hamer (Luxembourg)

===== Final =====
18 May 2005
22:45 MSK (UTC+4)

Sporting CP (Portugal)	1–3	(Russia) CSKA Moscow
Rogério 29'	Report Report (archive) Overview	A. Berezutskiy 56'; Zhirkov 65'; Vágner Love 75'

Estádio José Alvalade, Lisbon
Attendance: 47,085
Referee: Graham Poll (England)

Sporting CP	CSKA Moscow

GK	76	(Portugal) Ricardo
RB	15	(Portugal) Miguel Garcia
CB	14	(Nigeria) Joseph Enakarhire
CB	22	(Portugal) Beto
LB	37	(Brazil) Rogério		(substituted off) 80'
RM	8	(Portugal) Pedro Barbosa	(yellow card) 14'
CM	26	(Brazil) Fábio Rochemback
CM	28	(Portugal) João Moutinho		(substituted off) 88'
LM	11	(Chile) Rodrigo Tello
CF	31	(Brazil) Liédson
CF	10	(Portugal) Ricardo Sá Pinto		(substituted off) 73'
Substitutes:
GK	1	(Portugal) Nélson
DF	4	(Brazil) Anderson Polga
DF	27	(Portugal) Custódio
MF	45	(Portugal) Hugo Viana		(substituted on) 88'
MF	23	(Portugal) Rui Jorge
FW	9	(Romania) Marius Niculae		(substituted on) 73'
FW	17	(Cameroon) Roudolphe Douala		(substituted on) 80'
Manager:
(Portugal) José Peseiro

GK	35	(Russia) Igor Akinfeev
RB	24	(Russia) Vasili Berezutskiy
CB	4	(Russia) Sergei Ignashevich (c)
CB	6	(Russia) Aleksei Berezutskiy
LB	15	(Nigeria) Chidi Odiah
CM	22	(Russia) Evgeni Aldonin	(substituted off) 86'
CM	25	(Bosnia and Herzegovina) Elvir Rahimić
RW	7	(Brazil) Daniel Carvalho	(substituted off) 82'
LW	18	(Russia) Yuri Zhirkov
CF	11	(Brazil) Vágner Love
CF	9	(Croatia) Ivica Olić	(substituted off) 67'
Substitutes:
GK	1	(Russia) Veniamin Mandrykin
MF	2	(Lithuania) Deividas Šemberas	(substituted on) 82'
MF	8	(Russia) Rolan Gusev	(substituted on) 86'
MF	10	(Argentina) Osmar Ferreyra
MF	19	(Latvia) Juris Laizāns
MF	40	(Russia) Aleksandr Salugin
FW	17	(Serbia and Montenegro) Miloš Krasić	(substituted on) 67'
Manager:
(Russia) Valery Gazzaev

Man of the Match:
(Brazil) Daniel Carvalho (CSKA Moscow)

Assistant referees:
Michael Tingey (England)
Glenn Turner (England)
Fourth official:
Steve Bennett (England)

==== 2005–06 ====
===== First round =====
15 September 2005 1st leg	CSKA Moscow (Russia)	3–1	(Denmark) Midtjylland	Moscow, Russia
19:00 MSK (UTC+4)	Dudu (yellow card) 10'; Gusev 21'; Carvalho 76', 79'	Report	Pimpong 24'; Traoré (yellow card) 33'; M.Hansen (yellow card) 75'; Poulsen (yellow card) 88'	Stadium: Dynamo Stadium; Referee: Bernhard Brugger (Austria)

29 September 2005 2nd leg	Midtjylland (Denmark)	1–3 (2–6 agg.)	(Russia) CSKA Moscow	Herning, Denmark
22:00 MSK (UTC+4)	D. Nielsen 14'; Thygesen (yellow card) 45'; Pimpong (yellow card) 48'	Report	Carvalho 61', 77'; Samodin 76'	Stadium: MCH Arena; Referee: Edo Trivkovic (Croatia)

===== Group stage =====
Pos	Team	Pld	W	D	L	GF	GA	GD	Pts	Qualification
1	(France) Marseille	4	3	0	1	5	3	+2	9	Advance to knockout stage
2	(Bulgaria) Levski Sofia	4	2	0	2	4	4	0	6	Advance to knockout stage
3	(Netherlands) Heerenveen	4	1	2	1	2	2	0	5	Advance to knockout stage
4	(Russia) CSKA Moscow	4	1	1	2	3	4	−1	4	
5	(Romania) Dinamo București	4	1	1	2	2	3	−1	4	

20 October 2005 1	CSKA Moscow (Russia)	1–2	(France) Marseille	Moscow, Russia
19:30 MSK (UTC+4)	Vágner Love 80'	Report	Lamouchi 23'; Niang 38'; Cesar (yellow card) 39'	Stadium: Dynamo Stadium; Referee: Kristinn Jakobsson (Iceland)

3 November 2005 2	Heerenveen (Netherlands)	0–0	(Russia) CSKA Moscow	Heerenveen, Netherlands
22:30 MSK (UTC+3)	Bosvelt (yellow card) 72'; Breuer (yellow card) 74'	Report	Carvalho (yellow card) 60'	Stadium: Abe Lenstra Stadion; Referee: Martin Ingvarsson (Sweden)

24 November 2005 3	CSKA Moscow (Russia)	2–1	(Bulgaria) Levski Sofia	Moscow, Russia
18:30 MSK (UTC+3)	Ignashevich (yellow card) 36'; Vágner Love 49', 73'	Report	Tomašić (yellow card) 39'; Borimirov (yellow card) 66'; Domovchiyski 90'	Stadium: Dynamo Stadium; Referee: Kenny Clark (Scotland)

1 December 2005 4	Dinamo București (Romania)	1–0	(Russia) CSKA Moscow	Bucharest, Romania
20:30 MSK (UTC+3)	Zicu (yellow card) 17'; Grigorie (yellow card) 60'; Munteanu 73'; Moți (yellow card) 79'	Report		Stadium: Stadionul Dinamo; Referee: Fritz Stuchlik (Austria)

=== UEFA Super Cup ===
26 August 2005
22:45 MSK (UTC+4)

Liverpool (England)	3–1 (a.e.t.)	(Russia) CSKA Moscow
Cissé 82', 103'; García 109'	Report	Carvalho 28'

Stade Louis II, Monaco
Attendance: 17,042
Referee: René Temmink (Netherlands)

Liverpool	CSKA Moscow

GK	25	(Spain) Pepe Reina
RB	17	(Spain) Josemi	(yellow card) 50'
CB	23	(England) Jamie Carragher (c)
CB	4	(Finland) Sami Hyypiä	(yellow card) 73'
LB	6	(Norway) John Arne Riise		(substituted off) 79'
DM	16	(Germany) Dietmar Hamann
RM	3	(Republic of Ireland) Steve Finnan		(substituted off) 55'
CM	14	(Spain) Xabi Alonso		(substituted off) 70'
LM	30	(Netherlands) Boudewijn Zenden	(yellow card) 38'
SS	10	(Spain) Luis García
CF	19	(Spain) Fernando Morientes
Substitutes:
GK	20	(England) Scott Carson
DF	28	(England) Stephen Warnock
MF	22	(Mali) Mohamed Sissoko		(substituted on) 70'
FW	9	(France) Djibril Cissé		(substituted on) 79'
FW	24	(France) Florent Sinama Pongolle	(yellow card) 95'	(substituted on) 55'
Manager:
(Spain) Rafael Benítez

GK	35	(Russia) Igor Akinfeev
RB	15	(Nigeria) Chidi Odiah		(substituted off) 90'
CB	4	(Russia) Sergei Ignashevich (c)
CB	24	(Russia) Vasili Berezutski
LB	6	(Russia) Aleksei Berezutski
DM	22	(Russia) Evgeni Aldonin
RM	17	(Serbia and Montenegro) Miloš Krasić		(substituted off) 85'
CM	25	(Bosnia and Herzegovina) Elvir Rahimić
LM	18	(Russia) Yuri Zhirkov		(substituted off) 66'
AM	7	(Brazil) Daniel Carvalho
CF	11	(Brazil) Vágner Love
Substitutes:
GK	1	(Russia) Veniamin Mandrykin
MF	2	(Lithuania) Deividas Šemberas		(substituted on) 66'
MF	8	(Russia) Rolan Gusev		(substituted on) 90'
MF	10	(Brazil) Dudu Cearense	(yellow card) 101'	(substituted on) 85'
FW	13	(Russia) Sergey Samodin
Manager:
(Russia) Valery Gazzaev

Man of the Match:
(France) Djibril Cissé (Liverpool)

Assistant referees:
Adriaan Inia (Netherlands)
Rob Meenhuis (Netherlands)
Fourth official:
Eric Braamhaar (Netherlands)

Match rules

- 90 minutes
- 30 minutes of extra-time if necessary
- Penalty shootout if scores still level
- Five named substitutes
- Maximum of three substitutions

== Statistics ==
As of match played 1 December 2005

=== Appearances and goals ===
No.	Pos	Nat	Player	Total		Premier League		04/05 Russian Cup		05/06 Russian Cup		04/05 UEFA Cup		05/06 UEFA Cup		UEFA Super Cup	
No.	Pos	Nat	Player	Apps	Goals	Apps	Goals	Apps	Goals	Apps	Goals	Apps	Goals	Apps	Goals	Apps	Goals
1	GK	(Russia) RUS	Veniamin Mandrykin	3	0	1	0	1	0	1	0	0	0	0	0	0	0
2	DF	(Lithuania) LTU	Deividas Šemberas	48	0	23+5	0	6+1	0	1	0	4+2	0	5	0	0+1	0
4	DF	(Russia) RUS	Sergei Ignashevich	44	7	21+1	5	6	0	0	0	9	2	6	0	1	0
6	DF	(Russia) RUS	Aleksei Berezutski	50	3	27	2	7	0	1	0	8	1	6	0	1	0
7	MF	(Brazil) BRA	Daniel Carvalho	50	15	24+5	4	2+3	3	1	0	8+1	3	5	4	1	1
8	MF	(Russia) RUS	Rolan Gusev	47	8	17+8	4	5+2	1	1+1	1	1+5	1	5+1	1	0+1	0
9	FW	(Croatia) CRO	Ivica Olić	33	11	19+1	10	5	1	0	0	6+2	0	0	0	0	0
11	FW	(Brazil) BRA	Vágner Love	43	14	16+5	7	4+2	0	1	0	8+1	4	4+1	3	1	0
13	FW	(Russia) RUS	Sergey Samodin	19	2	3+9	0	2	1	1	1	0+1	0	1+2	0	0	0
15	DF	(Nigeria) NGA	Chidi Odiah	49	3	23+4	2	2+3	0	1	0	9	1	6	0	1	0
17	MF	(Serbia and Montenegro) SCG	Miloš Krasić	50	3	19+8	2	5+2	0	1	1	5+4	0	2+3	0	1	0
18	MF	(Russia) RUS	Yuri Zhirkov	39	4	17+3	2	4+1	1	1	0	8	1	3+1	0	1	0
20	MF	(Brazil) BRA	Dudu	26	3	12+9	3	0	0	1	0	0	0	2+1	0	0+1	0
22	MF	(Russia) RUS	Evgeni Aldonin	52	4	16+13	1	5+1	2	1+1	0	6+2	1	5+1	0	1	0
24	DF	(Russia) RUS	Vasili Berezutski	49	4	27	2	6	0	1	0	9	2	4+1	0	1	0
25	MF	(Bosnia and Herzegovina) BIH	Elvir Rahimić	52	1	30	1	5+1	0	1	0	8	0	6	0	1	0
35	GK	(Russia) RUS	Igor Akinfeev	52	0	29	0	6	0	1	0	9	0	6	0	1	0
37	MF	(Russia) RUS	Kirill Kochubei	1	0	0	0	0	0	0+1	0	0	0	0	0	0	0
38	FW	(Russia) RUS	Sergei Pravosud	6	1	4+1	1	0	0	1	0	0	0	0	0	0	0
39	DF	(Russia) RUS	Ivan Taranov	3	0	0+1	0	0	0	1	0	0	0	0+1	0	0	0
40	FW	(Russia) RUS	Aleksandr Salugin	9	1	1+4	1	0	0	0	0	0+1	0	0+3	0	0	0
41	DF	(Russia) RUS	Valeri Safonov	1	0	0	0	0	0	1	0	0	0	0	0	0	0
45	DF	(Uzbekistan) UZB	Vitaliy Denisov	1	0	0	0	0	0	1	0	0	0	0	0	0	0
49	DF	(Russia) RUS	Sergei Grichenkov	1	0	0	0	0	0	0+1	0	0	0	0	0	0	0
50	DF	(Russia) RUS	Anton Grigoryev	1	0	0	0	0	0	1	0	0	0	0	0	0	0
Players that left CSKA Moscow on loan during the season:
10	MF	(Argentina) ARG	Osmar Ferreyra	5	0	0+2	0	2+1	0	0	0	0	0	0	0	0	0
Players who appeared for CSKA Moscow no longer at the club:
19	MF	(Latvia) LVA	Juris Laizāns	13	3	1+2	1	4+1	2	1	0	1+3	0	0	0	0	0
28	DF	(Ukraine) UKR	Bohdan Shershun	6	0	0+1	0	0+1	0	1	0	0+3	0	0	0	0	0

=== Goal scorers ===
Place	Position	Nation	Number	Name	Premier League	04/05 Russian Cup	05/06 Russian Cup	04/05 UEFA Cup	05/06 UEFA Cup	UEFA Super Cup	Total
1	MF	(Brazil)	7	Daniel Carvalho	4	3	0	3	4	1	15
2	FW	(Brazil)	11	Vágner Love	7	0	0	4	3	0	14
3	FW	(Croatia)	9	Ivica Olić	10	1	0	0	0	0	11
4	MF	(Russia)	8	Rolan Gusev	4	1	1	1	1	0	8
5	DF	(Russia)	4	Sergei Ignashevich	5	0	0	2	0	0	7
6	MF	(Russia)	18	Yuri Zhirkov	2	1	0	1	0	0	4
6	DF	(Russia)	24	Vasili Berezutski	2	0	0	2	0	0	4
6	MF	(Russia)	22	Evgeni Aldonin	1	2	0	1	0	0	4
9	MF	(Brazil)	20	Dudu	3	0	0	0	0	0	3
9	DF	(Russia)	6	Aleksei Berezutski	2	0	0	1	0	0	3
9	DF	(Nigeria)	15	Chidi Odiah	2	0	0	1	0	0	3
9	MF	(Serbia and Montenegro)	17	Miloš Krasić	2	0	1	0	0	0	3
9	MF	(Latvia)	19	Juris Laizāns	1	2	0	0	0	0	3
9	FW	(Russia)	13	Sergey Samodin	0	1	1	0	1	0	3
15	MF	(Bosnia and Herzegovina)	25	Elvir Rahimić	1	0	0	0	0	0	1
15	FW	(Russia)	40	Aleksandr Salugin	1	0	0	0	0	0	1
15	FW	(Russia)	38	Sergei Pravosud	1	0	0	0	0	0	1
				TOTALS	48	11	3	16	9	1	88

=== Disciplinary record ===
Number	Nation	Position	Name	Premier League		04/05 Russian Cup		05/06 Russian Cup		04/05 UEFA Cup		05/06 UEFA Cup		UEFA Super Cup		Total	
Number	Nation	Position	Name	Booked	Sent off (straight red)	Booked	Sent off (straight red)	Booked	Sent off (straight red)	Booked	Sent off (straight red)	Booked	Sent off (straight red)	Booked	Sent off (straight red)	Booked	Sent off (straight red)
2	(Lithuania)	DF	Deividas Šemberas	6	0	1	0	0	0	0	0	0	0	0	0	7	0
4	(Russia)	DF	Sergei Ignashevich	4	0	3	0	0	0	0	0	1	0	0	0	8	0
6	(Russia)	DF	Aleksei Berezutski	4	0	1	0	0	0	3	0	0	0	0	0	8	0
7	(Brazil)	MF	Daniel Carvalho	3	0	0	0	0	0	2	0	1	0	0	0	6	0
8	(Russia)	MF	Rolan Gusev	4	0	0	0	1	0	0	0	0	0	0	0	5	0
9	(Croatia)	FW	Ivica Olić	3	0	0	0	0	0	0	0	0	0	0	0	3	0
11	(Brazil)	FW	Vágner Love	1	0	2	1	0	0	1	0	0	0	0	0	4	1
13	(Russia)	FW	Sergey Samodin	3	0	1	0	0	0	0	0	0	0	0	0	4	0
15	(Nigeria)	DF	Chidi Odiah	3	0	0	0	0	0	1	0	0	0	0	0	4	0
17	(Serbia and Montenegro)	MF	Miloš Krasić	2	0	1	0	1	0	2	0	0	0	0	0	6	0
18	(Russia)	MF	Yuri Zhirkov	3	0	3	0	0	0	1	0	0	0	0	0	7	0
20	(Brazil)	MF	Dudu	3	0	0	0	0	0	0	0	1	0	1	0	5	0
22	(Russia)	MF	Evgeni Aldonin	3	1	1	0	0	0	3	0	0	0	0	0	7	1
24	(Russia)	DF	Vasili Berezutski	5	0	1	0	0	0	1	0	0	0	0	0	7	0
25	(Bosnia and Herzegovina)	MF	Elvir Rahimić	5	0	1	0	0	0	2	0	0	0	0	0	8	0
35	(Russia)	GK	Igor Akinfeev	0	0	1	0	0	0	1	0	0	0	0	0	2	0
Players who left CSKA Moscow during the season:
19	(Latvia)	MF	Juris Laizāns	0	0	0	0	1	0	0	0	0	0	0	0	1	0
28	(Ukraine)	DF	Bohdan Shershun	1	0	0	0	1	0	0	0	0	0	0	0	2	0
			TOTALS	53	1	16	1	4	0	17	0	3	0	1	0	94	2
