= 2006 PFC CSKA Moscow season =

PFC CSKA Moscow
2006 season
- Manager: (Russia) Valery Gazzaev
- Russian Premier League: 1st
- Russian Super Cup: Winners
- 2005–06 Russian Cup: Winners
- 2006–07 Russian Cup: Progressed to 2007 season
- Champions League: Progressed to UEFA Cup
- Top goalscorer: League: Jô (14 goals); All: Jô (22 goals)

The 2006 Russian football season, saw CSKA Moscow competed in the Russian Premier League, Russian Cup, the UEFA Cup and the UEFA Champions League. CSKA defended their Premier League and Cup crown as well as winning the Russian Super Cup, to complete a Domestic Treble.

== Squad ==
As of match played 6 December 2006

Number	Name	Nationality	Position	Date of birth (age)	Signed from	Signed in	Contract ends	Apps.	Goals
Goalkeepers
1	Veniamin Mandrykin	(Russia)	GK	30 August 1981 (aged 25)	Alania Vladikavkaz	2002		68	0
35	Igor Akinfeev	(Russia)	GK	8 April 1986 (aged 20)	Academy	2003		152	0
51	Sergei Zhideyev	(Russia)	GK	2 April 1987 (aged 19)	Trudovyye Rezervy Moscow	2002		0	0
77	Vladimir Gabulov	(Russia)	GK	19 October 1983 (aged 23)	Alania Vladikavkaz	2004		3	0
Defenders
2	Deividas Šemberas	(Lithuania)	DF	2 August 1978 (aged 28)	Dynamo Moscow	2002		184	0
4	Sergei Ignashevich	(Russia)	DF	14 July 1979 (aged 27)	Lokomotiv Moscow	2004		115	11
6	Aleksei Berezutski	(Russia)	DF	20 June 1982 (aged 24)	Chernomorets Novorossiysk	2001		187	3
15	Chidi Odiah	(Nigeria)	DF	17 December 1983 (aged 22)	Sheriff Tiraspol	2004		56	4
24	Vasili Berezutski	(Russia)	DF	20 June 1982 (aged 24)	Torpedo-ZIL	2002		129	5
38	Oleg Malyukov	(Russia)	DF	16 January 1985 (aged 21)	Academy	2001		0	0
39	Ivan Taranov	(Russia)	DF	22 June 1986 (aged 20)	Chernomorets Novorossiysk	2002		24	0
41	Valeri Safonov	(Russia)	DF	13 May 1987 (aged 19)	Academy	2004		3	0
50	Anton Grigoryev	(Russia)	DF	13 December 1985 (aged 20)	Academy	2004		10	0
52	Grigoriy Dolmatov	(Russia)	DF	13 March 1987 (aged 19)	Academy	2006		0	0
55	Vadim Gagloyev	(Russia)	DF	18 January 1989 (aged 17)	Academy	2006		1	0
57	Sergei Gorelov	(Russia)	DF	29 April 1985 (aged 21)	Academy	2001		1	0
Midfielders
7	Daniel Carvalho	(Brazil)	MF	1 March 1983 (aged 23)	Internacional	2003		103	25
8	Rolan Gusev	(Russia)	MF	17 September 1977 (aged 29)	Dynamo Moscow	2002		180	41
17	Miloš Krasić	(Serbia)	MF	1 November 1984 (aged 22)	Vojvodina	2004		103	6
18	Yuri Zhirkov	(Russia)	MF	20 August 1983 (aged 23)	Spartak Tambov	2004		119	14
20	Dudu	(Brazil)	MF	15 April 1983 (aged 23)	Rennes	2005		70	8
22	Evgeni Aldonin	(Russia)	MF	22 January 1980 (aged 26)	Rotor Volgograd	2004		137	6
25	Elvir Rahimić	(Bosnia and Herzegovina)	MF	4 April 1976 (aged 30)	Anzhi Makhachkala	2001		220	4
37	Kirill Kochubei	(Russia)	MF	6 October 1986 (aged 20)	Chernomorets Novorossiysk	2002		10	0
43	Amir Kashiyev	(Russia)	MF	11 December 1989 (aged 16)	Academy	2006		2	0
46	Andrei Utitskikh	(Russia)	MF	12 January 1986 (aged 20)	Chernomorets Novorossiysk	2005		1	0
54	Aleksei Vasilyev	(Russia)	MF	28 October 1987 (aged 19)	Academy	2004		2	0
56	Vladimir Tatarchuk	(Russia)	MF	6 October 1986 (aged 20)	Academy	2004		3	0
Forwards
9	Ivica Olić	(Croatia)	FW	14 September 1979 (aged 27)	Dinamo Zagreb	2003		117	44
10	Jô	(Brazil)	FW	20 March 1987 (aged 19)	Corinthians	2006		29	22
11	Vágner Love	(Brazil)	FW	11 June 1984 (aged 22)	Palmeiras	2004		102	42
40	Aleksandr Salugin	(Russia)	FW	23 October 1988 (aged 18)	Krasny Oktyabr Moscow	2002		16	2
42	Dmitry Tikhonov	(Russia)	FW	13 September 1988 (aged 18)	Academy	2004		2	1
47	Igor Kuzmin	(Russia)	FW	13 January 1989 (aged 17)	Academy	2006		0	0
89	Vagif Javadov	(Azerbaijan)	FW	25 May 1989 (aged 17)	Academy	2004		0	0
Away on loan
38	Sergei Pravosud	(Russia)	FW	18 February 1986 (aged 20)	Academy	2002		6	1
45	Vitaliy Denisov	(Uzbekistan)	DF	23 February 1987 (aged 19)	Sportakademklub Moscow	2003		2	0

=== Out on loan ===
Note: Flags indicate national team as defined under FIFA eligibility rules; some limited exceptions apply. Players may hold more than one non-FIFA nationality.

No. / Pos. / Nation / Player; 38 / FW / RUS / Sergei Pravosud (at Sodovik Sterlitamak)	No. / Pos. / Nation / Player; 45 / DF / UZB / Vitaliy Denisov (at Spartak Nizhny Novgorod)

== Transfers ==
=== Winter ===
In: Note: Flags indicate national team as defined under FIFA eligibility rules; some limited exceptions apply. Players may hold more than one non-FIFA nationality.

No.	Pos.	Nation	Player
10	FW	BRA	Jô (from (Brazil) Corinthians)

Out: Note: Flags indicate national team as defined under FIFA eligibility rules; some limited exceptions apply. Players may hold more than one non-FIFA nationality.

No.	Pos.	Nation	Player
10	MF	ARG	Osmar Ferreyra (to (Argentina) San Lorenzo, previously on loan to (Netherlands) PSV Eindhoven)
13	FW	RUS	Sergey Samodin (to (Russia) Spartak Nizhny Novgorod)
23	FW	MDA	Sergiu Dadu (to (Moldova) Sheriff Tiraspol)
38	FW	RUS	Sergei Pravosud (on loan to (Russia) Shinnik Yaroslavl)
45	DF	UZB	Vitaliy Denisov (loan to (Russia) Spartak Nizhny Novgorod)
49	DF	RUS	Sergei Grichenkov (to (Russia) SKA Rostov-on-Don)

=== Summer ===
In: Note: Flags indicate national team as defined under FIFA eligibility rules; some limited exceptions apply. Players may hold more than one non-FIFA nationality.

No.	Pos.	Nation	Player
38	FW	RUS	Sergei Pravosud (loan return from (Russia) Shinnik Yaroslavl)

Out: Note: Flags indicate national team as defined under FIFA eligibility rules; some limited exceptions apply. Players may hold more than one non-FIFA nationality.

No.	Pos.	Nation	Player
38	FW	RUS	Sergei Pravosud (on loan to (Russia) Sodovik Sterlitamak)

== Competitions ==
=== Russian Super Cup ===
11 March 2006
16:00 MSK (UTC+3)

Spartak Moscow	2–3	CSKA Moscow
Titov 22'; Mozart 47'	Report	Zhirkov 42'; Odiah 73'; Jô 83'

Luzhniki Stadium, Moscow
Attendance: 43,000
Referee: Igor Egorov

Spartak Moscow:
GK	46	(Russia) Aleksei Zuev
DF	4	(Romania) Adrian Iencsi
DF	17	(Argentina) Clemente Rodríguez	(yellow card) 89' (yellow-red card) 90'
DF	20	(Lithuania) Ignas Dedura	(yellow card) 55'
MF	7	(Russia) Denis Boyarintsev
MF	9	(Russia) Yegor Titov (c)
MF	21	(Netherlands) Quincy Owusu-Abeyie
MF	23	(Russia) Vladimir Bystrov		(substituted off) 80'
MF	24	(Brazil) Mozart	(yellow card) 39' (yellow-red card) 90'
MF	27	(Moldova) Serghei Covalciuc		(substituted off) 86'
FW	9	(Russia) Roman Pavlyuchenko
Substitutes:
GK	1	(Russia) Dmitri Khomich
DF	35	(Russia) Sergei Kabanov
MF	8	(Russia) Dmitri Alenichev
MF	14	(Russia) Dmitri Torbinski
MF	25	(Ukraine) Maksym Kalynychenko		(substituted on) 80'
FW	18	(Serbia and Montenegro) Mihajlo Pjanović
MF	19	(Argentina) Fernando Cavenaghi		(substituted on) 86'
Manager:
(Latvia) Aleksandrs Starkovs Assistant referees: (Russia) Vladimir Yenyutin (Russia) Vladimir Bobyk; Fourth official: (Russia) Igor Zakharov

Spartak Moscow:
GK	35	(Russia) Igor Akinfeev
DF	4	(Russia) Sergei Ignashevich (c)	(yellow card) 90+'
DF	6	(Russia) Aleksei Berezutski	(yellow card) 40' (yellow-red card) 89'
DF	15	(Nigeria) Chidi Odiah	(yellow card) 90'
DF	24	(Russia) Vasili Berezutski
MF	10	(Brazil) Jô		(substituted off) 88'
MF	18	(Russia) Yuri Zhirkov
MF	22	(Russia) Evgeni Aldonin
MF	25	(Bosnia and Herzegovina) Elvir Rahimić	(yellow card) 45'
FW	7	(Brazil) Daniel Carvalho		(substituted off) 61'
FW	11	(Brazil) Vágner Love		(substituted off) 61'
Substitutes:
GK	77	(Russia) Vladimir Gabulov
DF	2	(Lithuania) Deividas Šemberas
MF	8	(Russia) Rolan Gusev
MF	17	(Serbia and Montenegro) Miloš Krasić		(substituted on) 61'
MF	20	(Brazil) Dudu Cearense		(substituted on) 88'
MF	37	(Russia) Kirill Kochubei
FW	9	(Croatia) Ivica Olić		(substituted on) 61'
Manager:
(Russia) Valery Gazzaev

=== Russian Premier League ===
==== Results by round ====
Round	1	2	3	4	5	6	7	8	9	10	11	12	13	14	15	16	17	18	19	20	21	22	23	24	25	26	27	28	29	30
Ground	A	H	A	H	A	H	A	H	A	H	H	A	H	A	H	A	H	A	H	A	H	A	H	A	H	A	H	A	A	H
Result	W	W	D	W	L	W	L	W	W	W	L	D	D	D	W	W	W	W	W	W	L	D	W	D	W	W	W	L	W	L

Updated to match(es) played on 25 November 2006. Source: See Results
A = Away; H = Home; W = Win; D = Draw; L = Loss

==== Results ====
18 March 2006 1	Spartak Nalchik	0 – 1	CSKA Moscow	Nalchik
16:00 MSK (UTC+3)	Mostovyi (yellow card) 29'; Kontsedalov (yellow card) 82'	Report	Ignashevich (yellow card) 55'; Vágner Love (yellow card) 86'; V.Berezutski 90+2'	Stadium: Spartak Stadium; Attendance: 14,400; Referee: Sergei Timofeyev

26 March 2006 2	CSKA Moscow	5 – 1	Shinnik Yaroslavl	Moscow
14:00 MSK (UTC+3)	Ignashevich 12'; Jô (yellow card) 21' (goal) 50', 58', 82' (pen.), 85'	Report	Romanovich (yellow card) 14' (yellow-red card) 28'; Khazov 31' (yellow card) 33'; Safonov (yellow card) 79'	Stadium: Luzhniki Stadium; Attendance: 9,000; Referee: Vladimir Pettay

1 April 2006 3	Spartak Moscow	1 – 1	CSKA Moscow	Moscow
14:00 MSK (UTC+4)	Kováč (yellow card) 30'; Titov 63'; Pavlenko (yellow card) 84'	Report	Aldonin (yellow card) 7'; Rahimić (yellow card) 50'; Vágner Love 59'; Akinfeev (red card) 61'	Stadium: Luzhniki Stadium; Attendance: 55,000; Referee: Massimo De Santis

8 April 2006 4	CSKA Moscow	2 – 0	Tom Tomsk	Moscow
18:00 MSK (UTC+4)	Jô 20', 41' (pen.)	Report	Yanotovsky (yellow card) 22'; Borzenkov (yellow card) 32'; Kaleshin (yellow card) 43'; Skerla (yellow card) 89'	Stadium: Luzhniki Stadium; Attendance: 9,200; Referee: Aleksei Tyumin

16 April 2006 5	Lokomotiv Moscow	3 – 2	CSKA Moscow	Moscow
14:00 MSK (UTC+4)	Sychev 23' (yellow card) 61'; Evseev (yellow card) 30'; O'Connor 48'; Ivanović 83'; Bikey (yellow card) 90'	Report	Gusev 28'; Jô 34'; Zhirkov (yellow card) 61'	Stadium: Lokomotiv Stadium; Attendance: 23,723; Referee: Valentin Ivanov

22 April 2006 6	CSKA Moscow	1 – 0	Saturn Moscow	Moscow
14:00 MSK (UTC+4)	Jô 12'; Zhirkov (yellow card) 39'; Šemberas (yellow card) 55'; A.Berezutski (yellow card) 72'; Vágner Love (yellow card) 86'	Report	Petráš (yellow card) 10'; Jakubko (yellow card) 37'; Obžera (yellow card) 63'; Géder (yellow card) 74'	Stadium: Luzhniki Stadium; Attendance: 10,000; Referee: Igor Yegorov

29 April 2006 7	Rubin Kazan	1 – 0	CSKA Moscow	Kazan
14:00 MSK (UTC+4)	Domínguez (yellow card) 27'; Bukharov 34'; Sinyov (yellow card) 64'; Scotti (yellow card) 79'; Bazayev (yellow card) 80'; Gațcan (yellow card) 90'	Report	Gusev (yellow card) 64'	Stadium: Central Stadium; Attendance: 25,000; Referee: Vladimir Pettay

6 May 2006 8	CSKA Moscow	2 – 0	Amkar Perm	Moscow
18:00 MSK (UTC+4)	Jô 12', 75'; Ignashevich (yellow card) 15'; V.Berezutski (yellow card) 62'; Carvalho (yellow card) 68'	Report	Ziyati (yellow card) 18'; Cherenchikov (yellow card) 49'; Lavrik (yellow card) 55' (yellow-red card) 73'	Stadium: Luzhniki Stadium; Attendance: 8,500; Referee: Eduard Malyi

14 May 2006 9	Moscow	0 – 1	CSKA Moscow	Moscow
14:00 MSK (UTC+4)	Melyoshin (yellow card) 11'; Bystrov (yellow card) 36'; Adamov (yellow card) 39'; Godunok (yellow card) 54'; Semak (yellow card) 55'; Kuzmin (yellow card) 77'	Report	Jô 17'; Rahimić (yellow card) 34'	Stadium: Eduard Streltsov Stadium; Attendance: 12,500; Referee: Almir Kayumov

6 July 2006 28	CSKA Moscow	2 – 0	Torpedo Moscow	Moscow
19:00 MSK (UTC+4)	Jô 7' (pen.); Šemberas (yellow card) 31'; Dudu (yellow card) 51'; Olić 65' (pen.)	Report	Geynrikh (yellow card) 17' (yellow-red card) 45'; Kuś (yellow card) 24'; Dancia (yellow card) 37'; Jokić (yellow card) 42'	Stadium: Dynamo Stadium; Attendance: 8,000; Referee: Aleksandr Yevstigneyev

10 July 2006 10	CSKA Moscow	1 – 2	Rostov	Moscow
19:00 MSK (UTC+4)	Jô (yellow card) 26' (goal) 31' (pen.)	Report	Dantsev 15'; Gutiérrez (yellow card) 22'; Laizāns (yellow card) 29'; Gogniyev (yellow card) 41' (goal) 62'; Tanasijević (yellow card) 47'; Kalachev (yellow card) 53'; Kruščić (yellow card) 65'	Stadium: Dynamo Stadium; Attendance: 6,000; Referee: Sergei Fursa

19 July 2006 11	Zenit St.Petersburg	0 – 0	CSKA Moscow	Saint Petersburg
19:00 MSK (UTC+4)	Radimov (yellow card) 38'; Škrtel (yellow card) 44'; Lee Ho (yellow card) 59'	Report	Rahimić (yellow card) 30'; V.Berezutski (yellow card) 39'; Carvalho (yellow card) 60'; Dudu (yellow card) 76'; Šemberas (yellow card) 84'	Stadium: Petrovsky Stadium; Attendance: 21,500; Referee: Aleksandr Gonchar

23 July 2006 12	CSKA Moscow	1 – 1	Krylia Sovetov Samara	Moscow
14:00 MSK (UTC+4)	Dudu (yellow card) 8'; Carvalho (red card) 86'; Krasić 90'	Report	Medvedev (yellow card) 42'; Topić 45'; Branco (yellow card) 61' (yellow-red card) 86'; Booth (yellow card) 69'; Łągiewka (yellow card) 77'; Angbwa (red card) 89'	Stadium: Dynamo Stadium; Attendance: 9,000; Referee: Igor Egorov

29 July 2006 13	Torpedo Moscow	2 – 2	CSKA Moscow	Moscow
19:00 MSK (UTC+4)	Mamayev (yellow card) 11'; Lutsenko (yellow card) 12'; Budylin 22'; Piechna (yellow card) 34'; Volkov (yellow card) 67'; Kantonistov 82' (yellow card) 83'	Report	Krasić 29' (yellow card) 63'; Rahimić (yellow card) 51' (goal) 83'; Berezutski (yellow card) 55'; Aldonin (yellow card) 64'	Stadium: Eduard Streltsov Stadium; Attendance: 12,000; Referee: Valentin Ivanov

3 August 2006 14	CSKA Moscow	2 – 1	Luch-Energiya Vladivostok	Moscow
19:00 MSK (UTC+4)	Krasić 16'; Rahimić (yellow card) 27'; Olić 69'; Jô (penalty missed) 78'	Summary	Tikhonovetsky (yellow card) 22' (yellow-red card) 45'; Semochko (yellow card) 29'; Ospeshinskiy 60'	Stadium: Dynamo Stadium; Attendance: 6,000; Referee: Aleksei Tyumin

13 August 2006 15	Dynamo Moscow	2 – 3	CSKA Moscow	Moscow
14:00 MSK (UTC+4)	Danny (yellow card) 9'; Yeshchenko (yellow card) 16'; Jean (yellow card) 59'; Derlei 62', 75'; Cícero (yellow card) 74'	Report	Dudu (yellow card) 21'; Vágner Love 40', 68'; Olić 48'; Taranov (yellow card) 77'	Stadium: Dynamo Stadium; Attendance: 15,000; Referee: Ľuboš Micheľ

19 August 2006 16	CSKA Moscow	2 – 1	Spartak Nalchik	Moscow
16:00 MSK (UTC+4)	Krasić (yellow card) 9'; Gusev (yellow card) 34'; Dudu (yellow card) 73'; Jô 79'; Vágner Love 83'	Report	Bitokov (yellow card) 7'; Kontsedalov (yellow card) 29' (goal) 43'; Skvortsov (yellow card) 74'	Stadium: Luzhniki Stadium; Attendance: 7,000; Referee: Igor Yegorov

27 August 2006 17	Shinnik Yaroslavl	0 – 1	CSKA Moscow	Yaroslavl
17:00 MSK (UTC+4)	Kostić (yellow card) 25'; Menteshashvili (yellow card) 52'; Mamayev (yellow card) 55'; Blyznyuk (yellow card) 85'	Report	Aldonin (yellow card) 14'; Olić 90+3'	Stadium: Shinnik Stadium; Attendance: 16,000; Referee: Eduard Malyi

9 September 2006 18	CSKA Moscow	2 – 2	Spartak Moscow	Moscow
16:00 MSK (UTC+4)	Carvalho 27'; Olić 63' (yellow card) 64'; Zhirkov (yellow card) 84'; Dudu (yellow card) 88'	Report	Stranzl (yellow card) 26'; Jiránek 35'; Kováč (yellow card) 38'; Cavenaghi (yellow card) 41'; Pavlyuchenko 81'	Stadium: Dynamo Stadium; Attendance: 36,000; Referee: Laurent Duhamel

17 September 2006 19	Tom Tomsk	0 – 1	CSKA Moscow	Tomsk
14:00 MSK (UTC+4)	Pogrebnyak (yellow card) 45'; Vejić (yellow card) 64'; Yanotovsky (yellow card) 66'; Klimov (yellow card) 90'; Kulchy (yellow card) 90'	Report	Zhirkov (yellow card) 31'; Olić 53'; Rahimić (yellow card) 66'; V.Berezutski (yellow card) 70'; Dudu (yellow card) 75'; Ignashevich (yellow card) 84'; Šemberas (yellow card) 87'	Stadium: Trud Stadium; Attendance: 15,000; Referee: Aleksandr Gvardis

23 September 2006 20	CSKA Moscow	1 – 2	Lokomotiv Moscow	Moscow
14:00 MSK (UTC+4)	Rahimić (yellow card) 16'; Dudu 36'; Carvalho (yellow card) 45'; Ignashevich (yellow card) 80'	Report	Loskov (yellow card) 15'; Sychev 20' (yellow card) 85'; Bilyaletdinov (yellow card) 37'; Izmailov 39' (yellow card) 78'	Stadium: Dynamo Stadium; Attendance: 17,000; Referee: Matteo Trefoloni

1 October 2006 21	Saturn Moscow	2 – 2	CSKA Moscow	Moscow
18:00 MSK (UTC+4)	Gyan (yellow card) 10' (goal) 32'; Igonin (yellow card) 43'; Fodrek (yellow card) 64'; Yashin (yellow card) 78'; Eremenko 87' (pen.)	Report	Krasić (yellow card) 36'; Dudu (yellow card) 40'; Vágner Love (yellow card) 49'; Ignashevich 62' (yellow card) 89'; Zhirkov (yellow card) 70'; Carvalho (yellow card) 71' (goal) 78' (pen.); Šemberas (yellow card) 84'; A.Berezutski (yellow card) 90'	Stadium: Saturn Stadium; Attendance: 16,500; Referee: Sergei Timofeyev

14 October 2006 22	CSKA Moscow	2 – 1	Rubin Kazan	Moscow
18:00 MSK (UTC+4)	V.Berezutski (yellow card) 59'; Zhirkov 67'; Dudu 71'; Aldonin (yellow card) 85'; Taranov (yellow card) 90'; Salugin (yellow card) 90'	Report	Baýramow (yellow card) 32'; Benachour 34' (yellow card) 63'; Vasilyev (yellow card) 48'; Calisto (yellow card) 61'; Gabriel (yellow card) 73'	Stadium: Dynamo Stadium; Attendance: 6,500; Referee: Aleksandr Gonchar

21 October 2006 23	Amkar Perm	0 – 0	CSKA Moscow	Perm
16:00 MSK (UTC+4)	Kobenko (yellow card) 38'; Belorukov (yellow card) 59'; Cherenchikov (yellow card) 69'	Report	Carvalho (yellow card) 32'; Dudu (yellow card) 53'	Stadium: Zvezda Stadium; Attendance: 16,500; Referee: Igor Yegorov

25 October 2006 24	CSKA Moscow	2 – 1	Moscow	Moscow
MSK (UTC+4)	Ignashevich (yellow card) 24'; Vágner Love 26', 45'; Krasić (yellow card) 75'; Rahimić (yellow card) 90'	Report	Adamov 32'; Bracamonte (yellow card) 33'; Rebeja (yellow card) 35'; Stoica (yellow card) 50' (yellow-red card) 85'	Stadium: Dynamo Stadium; Attendance: 6,500; Referee: Igor Zakharov

28 October 2006 25	Rostov	1 – 2	CSKA Moscow	Rostov-on-Don
15:00 MSK (UTC+3)	Kalachev (penalty missed) 77' 77'; Vještica (yellow card) 89'	Report	Olić 54', 85'; Šemberas (yellow card) 55'; Akinfeev (yellow card) 76'	Stadium: Olimp – 2 Attendance: 12,500; Referee: Aleksandr Gvardis

5 November 2006 26	CSKA Moscow	1 – 0	Zenit St. Petersburg	Moscow
14:00 MSK (UTC+3)	Vágner Love (yellow card) 17'; Carvalho 58' (pen.) (yellow card) 78'; Šemberas (yellow card) 61'; Krasić (yellow card) 82'; Zhirkov (yellow card) 83'	Report	Škrtel (yellow card) 43'; Tekke (yellow card) 46'; Arshavin (yellow card) 53'; Kim (yellow card) 56'; Hyun (yellow card) 65'; Spivak (yellow card) 85'; Križanac (yellow card) 87'	Stadium: Dynamo Stadium; Attendance: 19,000; Referee: Vladimir Pettay

8 November 2006 27	Krylia Sovetov Samara	2 – 0	CSKA Moscow	Samara
17:00 MSK (UTC+3)	Dokhoyan 29'; Gadzhiyev (yellow card) 45'; Booth 61' (pen.) (yellow card) 84'	Report	Taranov (yellow card) 36'	Stadium: Metallurg Stadion; Attendance: 22,000; Referee: Aleksandr Gonchar

18 November 2006 29	Luch-Energiya Vladivostok	0 – 4	CSKA Moscow	Vladivostok
14:00 MSK (UTC+3)	Semochko (yellow card) 50'; Sheshukov (yellow card) 53'	Report	Carvalho 15'; Vágner Love 25', 49', 62'; Aldonin (yellow card) 67'	Stadium: Dynamo Stadium; Attendance: 10,200; Referee: Aleksandr Gvardis

26 November 2006 30	CSKA Moscow	1 – 2	Dynamo Moscow	Moscow
16:00 MSK (UTC+3)	Odiah (yellow card) 39'; Olić 44'; A.Berezutski (yellow card) 63'	Report	Fernández (yellow card) 17'; Semshov 35'; Kolodin (yellow card) 71' (yellow-red card) 74' (goal) 73'; Karčemarskas (yellow card) 90'	Stadium: Dynamo Stadium; Attendance: 15,000; Referee: Aleksei Nikolaev

==== League table ====
Pos	Team	Pld	W	D	L	GF	GA	GD	Pts	Qualification or relegation
1	CSKA Moscow (C)	30	17	7	6	47	28	+19	58	Qualification to Champions League group stage
2	Spartak Moscow	30	15	13	2	60	36	+24	58	Qualification to Champions League third qualifying round
3	Lokomotiv Moscow	30	15	8	7	47	34	+13	53	Qualification to UEFA Cup first round (Note: Qualified as the winner of 2006–07 Russian Cup.)
4	Zenit St. Petersburg	30	13	11	6	42	30	+12	50	Qualification to UEFA Cup second qualifying round
5	Rubin Kazan	30	14	7	9	45	35	+10	49	Qualification to Intertoto Cup second round

Source: RFPL
Rules for classification: 1st points; 2nd matches won; 3rd goal difference; 4th head-to-head (points, matches won, goal difference, goals scored, away goals scored); 5th goals scored; 6th away goals scored; 7th drawing of lots
(C) Champions

=== Russian Cup ===
==== 2005–2006 ====
5 March 2006 Sixth round 1st leg	CSKA Moscow	5 – 0	Spartak Kostroma	Moscow
14:00 MSK (UTC+4)	Jô 10'; Aldonin 63', 77'; Zhirkov 66'; V.Berezutski (yellow card) 81'; Olić 85'	Report	Mordvinov (yellow card) 45'	Stadium: Dynamo Stadium; Referee: Eduard Malyi

15 March 2006 Sixth round 2nd leg	Spartak Kostroma	0 – 3 (0 – 8 agg.)	CSKA Moscow	Kostroma
16:00 MSK (UTC+4)	Nezhelev (yellow card) 21'	Report	Salugin 35'; Dudu 69'; Tikhonov 90'; Kashiyev (yellow card) 90'	Stadium: Urozhay Stadium; Referee: Alexei Kovalev

22 March 2006 Quarter-finals 1st leg	Rubin Kazan	1 – 1	CSKA Moscow	Kazan
18:00 MSK (UTC+4)	Baiano (yellow card) 18'; Calisto (yellow card) 21'; Bukharov 71'	Report	Gusev 3'; Odiah (yellow card) 77'; Dudu (yellow card) 90'	Stadium: Central Stadium; Referee: Sergei Fursa

12 April 2006 Quarter-finals 2nd leg	CSKA Moscow	4 – 1 (5 – 2 agg.)	Rubin Kazan	Moscow
14:00 MSK (UTC+4)	Jô 37', 68'; Vágner Love 42'; Olić 90'	Report	Baiano (yellow card) 25'; Scotti (yellow card) 28'; Gațcan 64'; Bazayev (yellow card) 73'; Baýramow (yellow card) 76'; Skrylnikov (yellow card) 81'	Stadium: Dynamo Stadium; Referee: Aleksandr Yevstigneyev

3 May 2006 Semi-finals 1st leg	CSKA Moscow	1 – 0	Zenit St. Petersburg	Moscow
14:00 MSK (UTC+4)	Rahimić (yellow card) 25'; Carvalho 61'	Report	Flachbart (yellow card) 28'; Šumulikoski (yellow card) 73'	Stadium: Luzhniki Stadium; Attendance: 6,500; Referee: Igor Egorov

10 May 2006 Semi-finals 2nd leg	Zenit St. Petersburg	0 – 3 (0 – 4 agg.)	CSKA Moscow	Saint Petersburg
20:00 MSK (UTC+4)	Anyukov (yellow card) 31'; Arshavin (yellow card) 63'; Poškus (yellow card) 73'	Report	Vágner Love 9'; Dudu 19'; Ignashevich 29' (yellow card) 31'; Zhirkov (yellow card) 45'	Stadium: Petrovsky Stadium; Attendance: 20,000; Referee: Aleksandr Gvardis

20 May 2006 Final	CSKA Moscow	3 – 0	Spartak Moscow	Moscow
14:00 MSK (UTC+4)	Jô 43', 90+3'; Zhirkov (yellow card) 57'; Aldonin (yellow card) 62'; Vágner Love (yellow card) 72' (goal) 90'	Report	Rodríguez (yellow card) 37'; Pavlyuchenko (yellow card) 47'; Kowalewski (yellow card) 70'; Stranzl (yellow card) 83'; Mozart (red card) 88'	Stadium: Luzhniki Stadium; Attendance: 67,000; Referee: Valentin Ivanov

==== 2006–2007 ====
2 July 2006 Fifth round 1st leg	CSKA Moscow	4 – 0	Mordovia Saransk	Moscow
19:00 MSK (UTC+4)	Carvalho 19'; Jô 25' (pen.), 62' (penalty missed) 62'; Vágner Love 90+1'	Report	Sysuyev (yellow card) 67'	Stadium: Dynamo Stadium; Attendance: 3,500; Referee: Vladimir Kazmenko

9 September 2006 Fifth round 2nd leg	Mordovia Saransk	1 – 0 (1 – 4 agg.)	CSKA Moscow	Saransk
18:00 MSK (UTC+4)	Dutov (yellow card) 9'; Sysuyev 24'; Ryabykh (yellow card) 37'	Report	Salugin (yellow card) 81'	Stadium: Start Stadium; Attendance: 13,500; Referee: Radik Ahmadullin

Round 16 took place during the 2007 season.

=== UEFA Champions League ===
==== Qualifying rounds ====
9 August 2006 3rd qualifying round 1st leg	CSKA Moscow (Russia)	3 – 0	(Slovakia) Ružomberok	Moscow, Russia
20:00 MSK (UTC+4)	A.Berezutski (yellow card) 32'; Aldonin (yellow card) 42'; Olić 58', 65'; Vágner Love 83'; Šemberas (yellow card) 88'	Report	Laurinc (yellow card) 25'; Žofčák (yellow card) 57'	Stadium: Lokomotiv Stadium; Referee: Florian Meyer (Germany)

23 August 2006 3rd qualifying round 2nd leg	Ružomberok (Slovakia)	0 – 2 (0 – 5 agg.)	(Russia) CSKA Moscow	Ružomberok, Slovakia
22:15 MSK (UTC+4)		Report	Carvalho 8'; Vágner Love 32'	Stadium: Štadión MFK Ružomberok; Referee: Olegário Benquerença (Portugal)

==== Group stage ====
Pos	Team	Pld	W	D	L	GF	GA	GD	Pts	Qualification
1	(England) Arsenal	6	3	2	1	7	3	+4	11	Advance to knockout stage
2	(Portugal) Porto	6	3	2	1	9	4	+5	11	Advance to knockout stage
3	(Russia) CSKA Moscow	6	2	2	2	4	5	−1	8	Transfer to UEFA Cup
4	(Germany) Hamburger SV	6	1	0	5	7	15	−8	3	

Source: RSSSF

13 September 2006 1	Porto (Portugal)	0 – 0	(Russia) CSKA Moscow	Porto, Portugal
22:45 MSK (UTC+4)		Report	Rahimić (yellow card) 36'; Dudu (yellow card) 41'; Zhirkov (yellow card) 46'	Stadium: Estádio do Dragão; Referee: Tom Henning Øvrebø (Norway)

26 September 2006 2	CSKA Moscow (Russia)	1 – 0	(Germany) Hamburg	Moscow, Russia
20:30 MSK (UTC+4)	Dudu 59'; Vágner Love (yellow card) 61'	Report	Sorín (yellow card) 33'; Mathijsen (yellow card) 54'; Lauth (red card) 85'; Jarolím (yellow card) 86'	Stadium: Lokomotiv Stadium; Referee: Jan Wegereef (Netherlands)

17 October 2006 3	CSKA Moscow (Russia)	1 – 0	(England) Arsenal	Moscow, Russia
20:30 MSK (UTC+4)	Carvalho 24'; Rahimić (yellow card) 61'; Ignashevich (yellow card) 82'; Vágner Love (yellow card) 85'	Report	Henry (yellow card) 86'	Stadium: Lokomotiv Stadium; Attendance: 36,500; Referee: Manuel Mejuto González (Spain)

1 November 2006 4	Arsenal (England)	0 – 0	(Russia) CSKA Moscow	London, England
20:45 MSK (UTC+3)	Henry (yellow card) 2'; Hleb (yellow card) 53'	Report	V.Berezutski (yellow card) 45'; Šemberas (yellow card) 90'	Stadium: Emirates Stadium; Referee: Ľuboš Micheľ (Slovakia)

21 November 2006 5	CSKA Moscow (Russia)	0 – 2	(Portugal) Porto	Moscow, Russia
20:30 MSK (UTC+3)	Vágner Love (yellow card) 46'; Kochubei (yellow card) 66'; Rahimić (yellow card) 73'; Zhirkov (yellow card) 90'	Report	Quaresma 2'; Assunção (yellow card) 7'; Pepe (yellow card) 19'; Alves (yellow card) 38'; Lucho 61'	Stadium: Lokomotiv Stadium; Referee: Kyros Vassaras (Greece)

6 December 2006 6	Hamburg (Germany)	3 – 2	(Russia) CSKA Moscow	Hamburg, Germany
22:45 MSK (UTC+3)	Berisha 28'; Atouba (yellow card) 49' (red card) 69' van der Vaart 84'; Sanogo 90'	Report	Dudu (yellow card) 31'; Olić 23' (pen.); Zhirkov 65'; V.Berezutski (yellow card) 82'	Stadium: Volksparkstadion; Referee: Stefano Farina (Italy)

== Statistics ==
As of match played 6 December 2006

=== Appearances and goals ===
No.	Pos	Nat	Player	Total		Premier League		05–06 Russian Cup		06–07 Russian Cup		UEFA Champions League		Super Cup	
No.	Pos	Nat	Player	Apps	Goals	Apps	Goals	Apps	Goals	Apps	Goals	Apps	Goals	Apps	Goals
1	GK	(Russia) RUS	Veniamin Mandrykin	3	0	1	0	1	0	1	0	0	0	0	0
2	DF	(Lithuania) LTU	Deividas Šemberas	39	0	19+5	0	5+1	0	1	0	8	0	0	0
4	DF	(Russia) RUS	Sergei Ignashevich	39	3	25+1	2	4+1	1	1	0	6	0	1	0
6	DF	(Russia) RUS	Aleksei Berezutski	45	0	29	0	6	0	1	0	8	0	1	0
7	MF	(Brazil) BRA	Daniel Carvalho	35	8	18+4	4	3	1	1	1	8	2	1	0
8	MF	(Russia) RUS	Rolan Gusev	27	2	9+9	1	5	1	0+1	0	0+3	0	0	0
9	FW	(Croatia) CRO	Ivica Olić	38	14	13+11	9	2+3	2	0	0	3+5	3	0+1	0
10	FW	(Brazil) BRA	Jô	29	22	16+2	14	6	5	1	2	2+1	0	1	1
11	FW	(Brazil) BRA	Vágner Love	38	15	21+2	9	6	3	1	1	6+1	2	1	0
15	DF	(Nigeria) NGR	Chidi Odiah	7	1	2+1	0	0+2	0	0	0	0+1	0	1	1
17	MF	(Serbia and Montenegro) SCG	Miloš Krasić	41	3	18+8	3	1+4	0	1	0	6+2	0	0+1	0
18	MF	(Russia) RUS	Yuri Zhirkov	42	4	25+2	1	6	1	0	0	7+1	1	1	1
20	MF	(Brazil) BRA	Dudu	44	5	20+8	2	5+1	2	0+1	0	7+1	1	0+1	0
22	MF	(Russia) RUS	Evgeni Aldonin	43	2	26+2	0	5	2	1	0	6+2	0	1	0
24	DF	(Russia) RUS	Vasili Berezutski	40	1	25+1	1	6	0	1	0	5+1	0	1	0
25	MF	(Bosnia and Herzegovina) BIH	Elvir Rahimić	44	1	30	1	5	0	1	0	7	0	1	0
37	MF	(Russia) RUS	Kirill Kochubei	9	0	1+3	0	1+1	0	0+1	0	0+2	0	0	0
35	GK	(Russia) RUS	Igor Akinfeev	44	0	28	0	6	0	1	0	8	0	1	0
39	DF	(Russia) RUS	Ivan Taranov	19	0	2+10	0	1+2	0	1	0	1+2	0	0	0
40	FW	(Russia) RUS	Aleksandr Salugin	7	1	1+4	0	1	1	1	0	0	0	0	0
41	DF	(Russia) RUS	Valeriy Safonov	2	0	0	0	1	0	1	0	0	0	0	0
42	FW	(Russia) RUS	Dmitry Tikhonov	2	1	0	0	0+1	1	0+1	0	0	0	0	0
43	MF	(Russia) RUS	Amir Kashiyev	2	0	0	0	0+1	0	1	0	0	0	0	0
46	MF	(Russia) RUS	Andrei Utitskikh	1	0	0	0	0	0	1	0	0	0	0	0
50	DF	(Russia) RUS	Anton Grigoryev	9	0	0+5	0	1+1	0	1	0	0+1	0	0	0
54	MF	(Russia) RUS	Aleksei Vasilyev	2	0	0	0	1	0	1	0	0	0	0	0
55	DF	(Russia) RUS	Vadim Gagloyev	1	0	0	0	0	0	1	0	0	0	0	0
56	MF	(Russia) RUS	Vladimir Tatarchuk	3	0	0	0	0+2	0	1	0	0	0	0	0
57	DF	(Russia) RUS	Sergei Gorelov	1	0	0	0	0	0	1	0	0	0	0	0
77	GK	(Russia) RUS	Vladimir Gabulov	3	0	1+2	0	0	0	0	0	0	0	0	0
Players that left CSKA Moscow on loan during the season:
Players who appeared for CSKA Moscow no longer at the club:
49	DF	(Russia) RUS	Sergei Grichenkov	1	0	0	0	1	0	0	0	0	0	0	0

=== Goal scorers ===
Place	Position	Nation	Number	Name	Premier League	05/06 Russian Cup	06/07 Russian Cup	Super Cup	UEFA Champions League	Total
1	FW	(Brazil)	10	Jô	14	5	2	1	0	22
2	FW	(Brazil)	11	Vágner Love	9	3	1	0	2	15
3	FW	(Croatia)	9	Ivica Olić	9	2	0	0	3	14
4	MF	(Brazil)	7	Daniel Carvalho	4	1	1	0	2	8
5	MF	(Brazil)	20	Dudu	2	2	0	0	1	5
6	MF	(Russia)	18	Yuri Zhirkov	1	1	0	1	1	4
7	MF	(Serbia and Montenegro)	17	Miloš Krasić	3	0	0	0	0	3
7	DF	(Russia)	4	Sergei Ignashevich	2	1	0	0	0	3
9	MF	(Russia)	8	Rolan Gusev	1	1	0	0	0	2
9	MF	(Russia)	22	Evgeni Aldonin	0	2	0	0	0	2
11	MF	(Bosnia and Herzegovina)	25	Elvir Rahimić	1	0	0	0	0	1
11	DF	(Russia)	24	Vasili Berezutski	1	0	0	0	0	1
11	FW	(Russia)	40	Aleksandr Salugin	0	1	0	0	0	1
11	FW	(Russia)	42	Dmitry Tikhonov	0	1	0	0	0	1
11	DF	(Nigeria)	15	Chidi Odiah	0	0	0	1	0	1
				TOTALS	47	20	4	3	9	83

=== Clean sheets ===
Place	Position	Nation	Number	Name	Premier League	05/06 Russian Cup	06/07 Russian Cup	Super Cup	UEFA Champions League	Total
1	GK	(Russia)	35	Igor Akinfeev	11	4	1	0	6	22
2	GK	(Russia)	77	Vladimir Gabulov	1	0	0	0	0	1
2	GK	(Russia)	1	Veniamin Mandrykin	0	1	0	0	0	1
				TOTALS	12	5	1	0	6	24

=== Disciplinary record ===
Number	Nation	Position	Name	Premier League		05/06 Russian Cup		06/07 Russian Cup		Champions League		Super Cup		Total	
Number	Nation	Position	Name	Yellow card	Red card	Yellow card	Red card	Yellow card	Red card	Yellow card	Red card	Yellow card	Red card	Yellow card	Red card
2	(Lithuania)	DF	Deividas Šemberas	7	0	0	0	0	0	2	0	0	0	9	0
4	(Russia)	DF	Sergei Ignashevich	6	0	1	0	0	0	1	0	1	0	9	0
6	(Russia)	DF	Aleksei Berezutski	4	0	0	0	0	0	1	0	2	1	7	1
7	(Brazil)	MF	Daniel Carvalho	6	1	0	0	0	0	0	0	0	0	6	1
8	(Russia)	MF	Rolan Gusev	2	0	0	0	0	0	0	0	0	0	2	0
9	(Croatia)	FW	Ivica Olić	1	0	0	0	0	0	0	0	0	0	1	0
10	(Brazil)	FW	Jô	2	0	0	0	0	0	0	0	0	0	2	0
11	(Brazil)	FW	Vágner Love	4	0	1	0	0	0	3	0	0	0	8	0
15	(Nigeria)	DF	Chidi Odiah	1	0	1	0	0	0	0	0	1	0	3	0
17	(Serbia and Montenegro)	MF	Miloš Krasić	5	0	0	0	0	0	0	0	0	0	5	0
18	(Russia)	MF	Yuri Zhirkov	6	0	2	0	0	0	2	0	0	0	10	0
20	(Brazil)	MF	Dudu	9	0	1	0	0	0	2	0	0	0	12	0
22	(Russia)	MF	Evgeni Aldonin	5	0	1	0	0	0	1	0	0	0	7	0
24	(Russia)	DF	Vasili Berezutski	4	0	1	0	0	0	2	0	0	0	7	0
25	(Bosnia and Herzegovina)	MF	Elvir Rahimić	9	0	1	0	0	0	3	0	1	0	14	0
35	(Russia)	GK	Igor Akinfeev	1	1	0	0	0	0	0	0	0	0	1	1
37	(Russia)	MF	Kirill Kochubei	0	0	0	0	0	0	1	0	0	0	1	0
39	(Russia)	FW	Ivan Taranov	3	0	0	0	0	0	0	0	0	0	3	0
40	(Russia)	FW	Aleksandr Salugin	1	0	0	0	1	0	0	0	0	0	2	0
43	(Russia)	MF	Amir Kashiyev	0	0	1	0	0	0	0	0	0	0	1	0
			TOTALS	76	2	10	0	1	0	18	0	5	1	110	3
