= 2007 Commonwealth of Independent States Cup =

CIS Cup, Кубок Содружества 2007

Tournament details
- Host country: Russia
- Dates: 20–28 January 2007
- Teams: 16
- Venues: 2 (in 1 host city)

Final positions
- Champions: (Uzbekistan) Pakhtakor Tashkent (1st title)

Tournament statistics
- Matches played: 31
- Goals scored: 81 (2.61 per match)
- Top scorer(s): (Uzbekistan) Server Djeparov (Belarus) Vitali Rodionov (4 goals)

The 2007 Commonwealth of Independent States Cup was the fifteenth edition of the competition and took place in Moscow beginning January 20. The final took take place in the Olimpiyski Sport Complex on January 28, and was won by Uzbek side Pakhtakor Tashkent 9–8 on a penalty shootout against Ventspils, from Latvia, after a goalless game.

== Participants ==
Team	Qualification	Participation
(Russia) CSKA Moscow	2006 Russian Premier League champions ^{1}	3rd
(Ukraine) Shakhtar Donetsk	2005–06 Vyshcha Liha champions ^{1}	4th
(Belarus) BATE Borisov	2006 Belarusian Premier League champions	3rd
(Lithuania) FBK Kaunas	2006 A Lyga champions	9th
(Latvia) Ventspils	2006 Latvian Higher League champions	1st
(Estonia) Levadia Tallinn	2006 Meistriliiga champions	4th
(Moldova) Sheriff Tiraspol	2005–06 Moldovan National Division champions	6th
(Georgia (country)) Sioni Bolnisi	2005–06 Umaglesi Liga champions	1st
(Armenia) Banants Yerevan	2006 Armenian Premier League runners-up ^{2}	1st
(Azerbaijan) Baku	2005–06 Azerbaijan Top League champions	1st
(Kazakhstan) Aktobe	2006 Kazakhstan Premier League runners-up ^{3}	2nd
(Uzbekistan) Pakhtakor Tashkent	2006 Uzbek League champions	6th
(Tajikistan) Regar-TadAZ Tursunzoda	2006 Tajik League champions	6th
(Turkmenistan) HTTU Ashgabat	2006 Ýokary Liga champions	2nd
(Kyrgyzstan) Dordoi-Dynamo Naryn	2006 Kyrgyzstan League champions	3rd
(Serbia) OFK Beograd	2005–06 Serbia and Montenegro SuperLiga 6th team ^{4}	1st

- ^{1} CSKA Moscow and Shakhtar Donetsk were represented by reserve players.
- ^{2} Banants Yerevan replaced Pyunik Yerevan (2006 Armenian champions), who were not allowed to participate after last year's semifinal incident.
- ^{3} Aktobe replaced Astana (2006 Kazakhstan champions), who declined to participate.
- ^{4} OFK Beograd invited by the organizing committee instead of Russian U21/U19 teams.

== Group stage ==
=== Group A ===
Team	Pld	W	D	L	GF	GA	GD	Pts
(Russia) CSKA Moscow	3	2	1	0	6	3	+3	7
(Belarus) BATE Borisov	3	2	0	1	4	2	+2	6
(Kazakhstan) Aktobe	3	0	2	1	1	3	−2	2
(Tajikistan) Regar-TadAZ Tursunzoda	3	0	1	2	2	5	−3	1

==== Results ====
20 January 2007
19:00

CSKA Moscow (Russia)	1 – 1	(Kazakhstan) Aktobe
Pravosud 6'		Sobolev 76'

Olympic Sport Complex, Moscow
Attendance: 4,200
Referee: Karen Nalbandyan (Armenia)
20 January 2007
19:00

BATE Borisov (Belarus)	2 – 0	(Tajikistan) Regar-TadAZ Tursunzoda
Rodionov 37', 49'

Dynamo Manage, Moscow
Attendance: 300
Referee: Hannes Kaasik (Estonia)

21 January 2007
19:00

CSKA Moscow (Russia)	2 – 0	(Belarus) BATE Borisov
Tatarchuk 67'; Gagloev 75'

Olympic Sport Complex, Moscow
Attendance: 2,500
Referee: Veaceslav Banari (Moldova)
21 January 2007
19:00

Regar-TadAZ Tursunzoda (Tajikistan)	0 – 0	(Kazakhstan) Aktobe

Dynamo Manage, Moscow
Attendance: 200
Referee: Allabergen Sapaev (Turkmenistan)

23 January 2007
19:00

Regar-TadAZ Tursunzoda (Tajikistan)	2 – 3	(Russia) CSKA Moscow
Abdulloyev 8'; Rakhimov 82'		Grichenkov 28'; Pravosud 31'; Kochubei 90'

Olympic Sport Complex, Moscow
Attendance: 4,200
Referee: Romāns Lajuks (Latvia)
23 January 2007
19:00

Aktobe (Kazakhstan)	0 – 2	(Belarus) BATE Borisov
		Rodionov 80', 83' (pen.)

Dynamo Manage, Moscow
Attendance: 100
Referee: Levan Kvaratskhelia (Georgia)

=== Group B ===
Team	Pld	W	D	L	GF	GA	GD	Pts
(Moldova) Sheriff Tiraspol	3	3	0	0	10	5	+5	9
(Azerbaijan) Baku	3	2	0	1	6	4	+2	6
(Estonia) Levadia Tallinn	3	1	0	2	6	4	+2	3
(Kyrgyzstan) Dordoi-Dynamo Naryn	3	0	0	3	0	9	−9	0

==== Results ====
20 January 2007
13:00

Baku (Azerbaijan)	3 – 4	(Moldova) Sheriff Tiraspol
Musayev 40'; Mujiri 71'; Ionescu 89'		Thiago 36'; Kuchuk 41'; Wallace 45'; Tarkhnishvili 78'

Olympic Sport Complex, Moscow
Attendance: 2,000
Referee: Aleksei Nikolaev (Russia)
20 January 2007
13:00

Levadia Tallinn (Estonia)	4 – 0	(Kyrgyzstan) Dordoi-Dynamo Naryn
Vassiljev 25'; V.Leitan 29', 37'; Nahk 73'

Dynamo Manage, Moscow
Attendance: 100
Referee: Igor Kister (Kazakhstan)

21 January 2007
13:00

Sheriff Tiraspol (Moldova)	3 – 2	(Estonia) Levadia Tallinn
Humenyuk 22'; Wallace 55'; Tarkhnishvili 61'		Nahk 20'; Purje 36'

Olympic Sport Complex, Moscow
Attendance: 250
Referee: Oleh Oriekhov (Ukraine)
21 January 2007
13:00

Baku (Azerbaijan)	2 – 0	(Kyrgyzstan) Dordoi-Dynamo Naryn
Gogoberishvili 77'; Musayev 90+4'

Dynamo Manage, Moscow
Attendance: 200
Referee: Gediminas Mažeika (Lithuania)

23 January 2007
13:00

Levadia Tallinn (Estonia)	0 – 1	(Azerbaijan) Baku
		Mujiri 52'

Olympic Sport Complex, Moscow
Attendance: 250
Referee: Stanislav Sukhina (Russia)
23 January 2007
13:00

Dordoi-Dynamo Naryn (Kyrgyzstan)	0 – 3	(Moldova) Sheriff Tiraspol
		Alexeev 6'; Suvorov 12', 40'

Dynamo Manage, Moscow
Attendance: 350
Referee: Karen Nalbandyan (Armenia)

=== Group C ===
Team	Pld	W	D	L	GF	GA	GD	Pts
(Uzbekistan) Pakhtakor Tashkent	3	2	0	1	7	2	+5	6
(Latvia) Ventspils	3	1	2	0	5	3	+2	5
(Armenia) Banants Yerevan	3	0	2	1	4	7	−3	2
(Ukraine) Shakhtar Donetsk	3	0	2	1	3	7	−4	2

==== Results ====
20 January 2007
17:00

Shakhtar Donetsk (Ukraine)	2 – 2	(Armenia) Banants Yerevan
Holopyorov 28'; Hoshkoderya 53'		Hakobyan 19'; Melkonyan 52'

Olympic Sport Complex, Moscow
Attendance: 3,000
Referee: Stanislav Sukhina (Russia)
20 January 2007
17:00

Pakhtakor Tashkent (Uzbekistan)	0 – 2	(Latvia) Ventspils
		Butriks 63'; Nesterov 88' (o.g.)

Dynamo Manage, Moscow
Attendance: 200
Referee: Levan Kvaratskhelia (Georgia)

21 January 2007
17:00

Ventspils (Latvia)	1 – 1	(Ukraine) Shakhtar Donetsk
Kačanovs 70'		Moldovan 35'

Olympic Sport Complex, Moscow
Attendance: 2,000
Referee: Igor Zakharov (Russia)
21 January 2007
17:00

Banants Yerevan (Armenia)	0 – 3	(Uzbekistan) Pakhtakor Tashkent
		Djeparov 4', 8'; Kletskov 83'

Dynamo Manage, Moscow
Attendance: 200
Referee: Emil Busurmankulov (Kyrgyzstan)

23 January 2007
17:00

Pakhtakor Tashkent (Uzbekistan)	4 – 0	(Ukraine) Shakhtar Donetsk
Koshelev 14'; Djeparov 56'; Kapadze 70'; Klikunov 77'

Olympic Sport Complex, Moscow
Attendance: 1,000
Referee: Veaceslav Banari (Moldova)
23 January 2007
17:00

Banants Yerevan (Armenia)	2 – 2	(Latvia) Ventspils
Hakobyan 56'; Sseppuya 62'		Soleičuks 4'; Ndeki 16'

Dynamo Manage, Moscow
Attendance: 300
Referee: Rustam Kholov (Tajikistan)

=== Group D ===
Team	Pld	W	D	L	GF	GA	GD	Pts
(Lithuania) FBK Kaunas	3	2	0	1	8	4	+4	6
(Serbia) OFK Beograd	3	2	0	1	6	4	+2	6
(Georgia (country)) Sioni Bolnisi	3	2	0	1	5	4	+1	6
(Turkmenistan) HTTU Ashgabat	3	0	0	3	1	8	−7	0

==== Results ====
20 January 2007
15:00

OFK Beograd (Serbia)	2 – 0	(Turkmenistan) HTTU Ashgabat
Kolarov 22'; Veselinović 70'

Olympic Sport Complex, Moscow
Attendance: 500
Referee: Valery Vyalichka (Belarus)
20 January 2007
15:00

FBK Kaunas (Lithuania)	2 – 1	(Georgia (country)) Sioni Bolnisi
Pehlić 20'; V.Hleb 90+1'		Silagadze 45'

Dynamo Manage, Moscow
Attendance: 200
Referee: Ravshan Irmatov (Uzbekistan)

21 January 2007
15:00

FBK Kaunas (Lithuania)	2 – 3	(Serbia) OFK Beograd
Pehlić 6'; Ledesma 14'		Nuhi 59'; Veselinović 80'; Novaković 90'

Olympic Sport Complex, Moscow
Attendance: 1,000
Referee: Igor Egorov (Russia)
21 January 2007
15:00

HTTU Ashgabat (Turkmenistan)	1 – 2	(Georgia (country)) Sioni Bolnisi
Şamyradow 58'		Tchassem 21'; Daraselia 31'

Dynamo Manage, Moscow
Attendance: 1,000
Referee: Romāns Lajuks (Latvia)

23 January 2007
15:00

Sioni Bolnisi (Georgia (country))	2 – 1	(Serbia) OFK Beograd
Oniani 46'; Daraselia 61'		Kolarov 88'

Olympic Sport Complex, Moscow
Attendance: 1,500
Referee: Aleksandr Gvardis (Russia)
23 January 2007
15:00

HTTU Ashgabat (Turkmenistan)	0 – 4	(Lithuania) FBK Kaunas
		Strakhanovich 41'; Pehlić 42'; V.Hleb 44'; Kšanavičius 90'

Dynamo Manage, Moscow
Attendance: 200
Referee: Vusal Aliyev (Azerbaijan)

== Final rounds ==
Quarterfinals (24 Jan)
(Moldova)	Sheriff Tiraspol	1
(Belarus)	BATE Borisov	0
(Uzbekistan)	Pakhtakor Tashkent (p)	1
(Serbia)	OFK Beograd	1
(Lithuania)	FBK Kaunas	1
(Latvia)	Ventspils (p)	1
(Russia)	CSKA Moscow (p)	0
(Azerbaijan)	Baku	0

Semifinals (26 Jan)
(Moldova)	Sheriff Tiraspol	0
(Uzbekistan)	Pakhtakor Tashkent	1
(Latvia)	Ventspils	1
(Russia)	CSKA Moscow	0

Final (28 Jan)
(Uzbekistan)	Pakhtakor Tashkent (p)	0
(Latvia)	Ventspils	0

=== Quarterfinals ===
24 January 2007
13:00

FBK Kaunas (Lithuania)	1 – 1	(Latvia) Ventspils
Strakhanovich 63'		Rimkus 51'
Penalties
Kijanskas (penalty scored); Činikas (penalty missed); V.Hleb (penalty scored); Strakhanovich (penalty missed); Kančelskis (penalty missed)	2 – 4	(penalty scored) Rimkus; (penalty scored) Dubensky; (penalty scored) Kačanovs; (penalty scored) Pokarynin

Olympic Sport Complex, Moscow
Attendance: 1,000
Referee: Aleksandr Gvardis (Russia)

24 January 2007
15:00

Sheriff Tiraspol (Moldova)	1 – 0	(Belarus) BATE Borisov
Kuchuk 21'

Olympic Sport Complex, Moscow
Attendance: 1,500
Referee: Vusal Aliyev (Azerbaijan)

24 January 2007
17:00

Pakhtakor Tashkent (Uzbekistan)	1 – 1	(Serbia) OFK Beograd
Djeparov 45' (pen.)		Anđelković 75'
Penalties
Djeparov (penalty scored); Inomov (penalty scored); Kapadze (penalty missed); Kiryan (penalty scored); Ponomarev (penalty scored)	4 – 2	(penalty scored) Kolarov; (penalty missed) Božović; (penalty missed) Pilipović; (penalty scored) Todorović

Olympic Sport Complex, Moscow
Attendance: 1,000
Referee: Igor Zakharov (Russia)

24 January 2007
19:00

CSKA Moscow (Russia)	0 – 0	(Azerbaijan) Baku
Penalties
Stepanets (penalty scored); Salugin (penalty scored); Kochubei (penalty scored); Gorelov (penalty missed)	3 – 2	(penalty scored) Gogoberishvili; (penalty missed) Ladaga; (penalty missed) Mujiri; (penalty scored) Gomes; (penalty missed) Abdullayev

Olympic Sport Complex, Moscow
Attendance: 4,500
Referee: Oleh Oriekhov (Ukraine)

=== Semifinals ===
26 January 2007
16:00

Sheriff Tiraspol (Moldova)	0 – 1	(Uzbekistan) Pakhtakor Tashkent
		Koshelev 40'

Olympic Sport Complex, Moscow
Attendance: 2,100
Referee: Hannes Kaasik (Estonia)

26 January 2007
19:00

Ventspils (Latvia)	1 – 0	(Russia) CSKA Moscow
Rimkus 80'

Olympic Sport Complex, Moscow
Attendance: 1,500
Referee: Igor Kister (Kazakhstan)

=== Finals ===
28 January 2007
13:00

Pakhtakor Tashkent (Uzbekistan)	0 – 0	(Latvia) Ventspils
Penalties
Djeparov (penalty missed); Inomov (penalty scored); Kapadze (penalty scored); Koshelev (penalty scored); Soliev (penalty scored); Bayramov (penalty scored); Kletskov (penalty scored); Suyunov (penalty scored); Iheruome (penalty scored); Juraev (penalty scored)	9 – 8	(penalty scored) Rimkus; (penalty scored) Ziziļevs; (penalty scored) Kačanovs; (penalty scored) Koļesņičenko; (penalty missed) Zangareev; (penalty scored) Dubensky; (penalty scored) Kosmačovs; (penalty scored) Gončars; (penalty scored) Ndeki; (penalty missed) Vaņins

Olympic Sport Complex, Moscow
Attendance: 5,000
Referee: Oleh Oriekhov (Ukraine)

== Top scorers ==
Rank	Player	Team	Goals
1	(Uzbekistan) Server Djeparov	(Uzbekistan) Pakhtakor Tashkent	4
1	(Belarus) Vitali Rodionov	(Belarus) BATE Borisov	4
3	(Bosnia and Herzegovina) Edin Pehlić	(Lithuania) FBK Kaunas	3
