= Dubensky =

Dubensky or Dubyonsky (masculine), Dubenskaya or Dubyonskaya (feminine), or Dubenskoye or Dubyonskoye (neuter) may refer to:

- Zakhar Dubensky (b. 1978), Russian soccer player
- Dubensky District, name of several districts in the countries of the former Soviet Union
- Dubensky (inhabited locality) (Dubenskaya, Dubenskoye), name of several rural localities in Russia
