= Dubensky District, Russia =

One of two districts in Russia

Location of the Republic of Mordovia in Russia

Location of Tula Oblast in Russia

Dubensky District or Dubyonsky District is the name of several administrative and municipal districts in Russia.

- Dubyonsky District, Republic of Mordovia, an administrative and municipal district of the Republic of Mordovia
- Dubensky District, Tula Oblast, an administrative and municipal district of Tula Oblast

== See also ==
- Dubensky (disambiguation)
