= Dubensky District =

Dubensky District or Dubyonsky District may refer to:

- Dubensky District, Russia, name of several districts in Russia
- Dubno Raion (Dubenskyi raion), a district of Rivne Oblast, Ukraine
