= Deividas Šemberas =

Lithuanian footballer (born 1978)

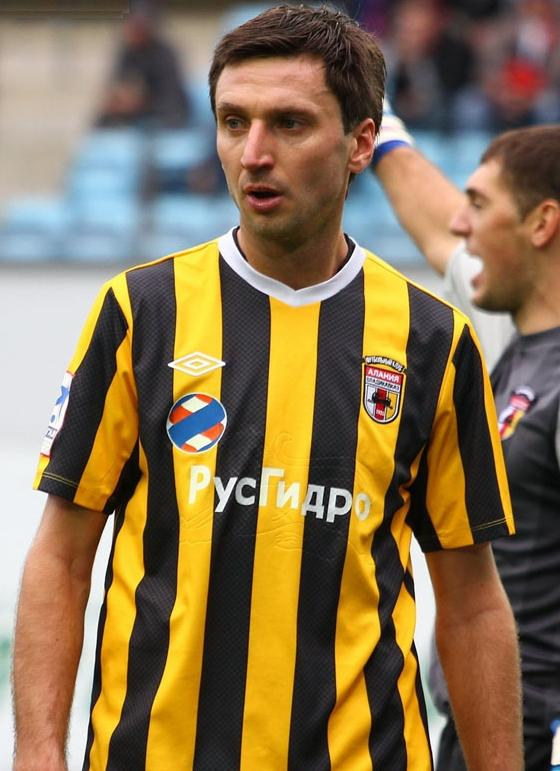
- Šemberas with Alania in 2012

Personal information
- Full name: Deividas Šemberas
- Date of birth: 2 August 1978 (age 48)
- Place of birth: Vilnius, Lithuanian SSR, Soviet Union
- Height: 1.87 m (6 ft 2 in)
- Positions: Centre-back; defensive midfielder

Senior career*
| Years | Team | Apps | (Gls) |
| 1996–1998 | Žalgiris Vilnius | 25 | (3) |
| 1998–2001 | Dynamo Moscow | 88 | (2) |
| 2002–2012 | CSKA Moscow | 254 | (2) |
| 2012–2013 | Alania Vladikavkaz | 46 | (0) |
| 2014–2015 | Žalgiris Vilnius | 53 | (7) |
| Total | | 466 | (13) |

International career
| 1996–2013 | Lithuania | 82 | (0) |
- * Club domestic league appearances and goals

Deividas Šemberas (born 2 August 1978) is a Lithuanian former professional footballer who played as a centre-back or defensive midfielder. Between 1996 and 2013, he earned 82 international caps for Lithuania.

== Club career ==
Šemberas started his career in his home town of Vilnius, playing for FK Žalgiris from 1996 to 1998. Subsequently, he moved to Russian Premier League club Dynamo Moscow, for which he appeared in 88 games, scoring two goals. After four years at Dynamo, he joined rival team CSKA Moscow, where he stayed until 2012. In his ten years at CSKA, he won the Russian Premier League four times and the Russian Cup six times with his team. On 18 May 2005, he won the 2004–05 UEFA Cup with CSKA after they defeated Sporting CP 3–1 in the final. During the final, Šemberas came on as a substitute for Daniel Carvalho in the 82nd minute. He was named Lithuanian Footballer of the Year 2005 by the Lithuanian Football Federation.

On 13 July 2012, Šemberas moved to Alania Vladikavkaz. After the club was relegated at the end of the 2012–13 season, he left the club in February 2014 and re-joined his old club FK Žalgiris. He was appointed as the team's captain and won the Lithuanian double, consisting of the A Lyga title and the Lithuanian Football Cup, in the seasons 2014 and 2015, before retiring from professional football.

== International career ==
Šemberas made his debut for the Lithuania national team in 1996 in a friendly match against Indonesia. Between 1996 and 2013, he earned 82 caps for his country.

== Managerial career ==
On 3 December 2015, Šemberas was appointed as the president of the A lygos klubų asociacija, the association that organizes the game operations of the A Lyga.

Im November 2018, FK Žalgiris announced Šemberas as their new sporting director, alongside fellow former Lithuanian national Deividas Česnauskis. In May 2020, the club announced that Šemberas left his position at FK Žalgiris.

In March 2021, he was appointed as the president of the Vilnius Regional Football Association (VRFS).

== Personal life ==
Until 2010, Šemberas was married to Agnė Armoškaitė-Šemberienė, with whom he had one son (born in 2002). In 2018, he married Oksana Zlatkovaitė, with whom he has a daughter (born in 2019).

== Career statistics ==
=== Club ===
Appearances and goals by club, season and competition
| Club | Season | League | | | Cup | | Europe | | Other | | Total | |
| Club | Season | Division | Apps | Goals | Apps | Goals | Apps | Goals | Apps | Goals | Apps | Goals |
|---|---|---|---|---|---|---|---|---|---|---|---|---|
| Dinamo Moscow | 1998 | Russian Premier League | 14 | 0 | 0 | 0 | 3 | 0 | - | | 17 | 0 |
| Dinamo Moscow | 1999 | Russian Premier League | 24 | 0 | 0 | 0 | — | | - | | 24 | 0 |
| Dinamo Moscow | 2000 | Russian Premier League | 24 | 1 | 2 | 0 | 2 | 0 | - | | 28 | 1 |
| Dinamo Moscow | 2001 | Russian Premier League | 26 | 1 | 2 | 0 | 4 | 0 | - | | 28 | 1 |
| Dinamo Moscow | Total | | 88 | 2 | 4 | 0 | 9 | 0 | - | - | 96 | 2 |
| CSKA Moscow | 2002 | Russian Premier League | 28 | 0 | 3 | 0 | 2 | 0 | - | | 33 | 0 |
| CSKA Moscow | 2003 | Russian Premier League | 21 | 0 | 3 | 0 | 1 | 0 | 1 | 0 | 26 | 0 |
| CSKA Moscow | 2004 | Russian Premier League | 24 | 0 | 3 | 0 | 10 | 0 | 1 | 0 | 38 | 0 |
| CSKA Moscow | 2005 | Russian Premier League | 28 | 0 | 8 | 0 | 11 | 0 | 1 | 0 | 48 | 0 |
| CSKA Moscow | 2006 | Russian Premier League | 24 | 0 | 7 | 0 | 8 | 0 | 0 | 0 | 39 | 0 |
| CSKA Moscow | 2007 | Russian Premier League | 24 | 0 | 4 | 0 | 6 | 0 | 1 | 0 | 35 | 0 |
| CSKA Moscow | 2008 | Russian Premier League | 24 | 0 | 3 | 0 | 6 | 0 | - | | 33 | 0 |
| CSKA Moscow | 2009 | Russian Premier League | 26 | 1 | 3 | 0 | 8 | 0 | 1 | 1 | 37 | 1 |
| CSKA Moscow | 2010 | Russian Premier League | 26 | 0 | 1 | 0 | 11 | 0 | 1 | 0 | 39 | 0 |
| CSKA Moscow | 2011–12 | Russian Premier League | 29 | 0 | 2 | 0 | 7 | 0 | 0 | 0 | 38 | 0 |
| CSKA Moscow | Total | | 254 | 1 | 37 | 0 | 70 | 0 | 6 | 1 | 367 | 2 |
| Alania Vladikavkaz | 2012–13 | Russian Premier League | 27 | 0 | 0 | 0 | - | | — | | 27 | 0 |
| Alania Vladikavkaz | 2013–14 | Russian National Football League | 19 | 0 | 1 | 0 | - | | — | | 20 | 0 |
| Alania Vladikavkaz | Total | | 46 | 0 | 1 | 0 | — | | — | | 47 | 0 |
| Žalgiris Vilnius | 2014 | A Lyga | 28 | 4 | 3 | 0 | 2 | 0 | — | | 33 | 4 |
| Žalgiris Vilnius | 2015 | A Lyga | 25 | 3 | 2 | 1 | 2 | 0 | — | | 29 | 4 |
| Žalgiris Vilnius | Total | | 53 | 7 | 5 | 1 | 4 | 0 | — | | 62 | 8 |
| Career total | | | 441 | 10 | 47 | 1 | 83 | 0 | 6 | 1 | 572 | 12 |

=== International ===
Appearances and goals by national team and year
| National team | Year | Apps | Goals |
|---|---|---|---|
| Lithuania | 1996 | 1 | 0 |
| Lithuania | 1997 | 2 | 0 |
| Lithuania | 1998 | 6 | 0 |
| Lithuania | 1999 | 5 | 0 |
| Lithuania | 2000 | 7 | 0 |
| Lithuania | 2001 | 6 | 0 |
| Lithuania | 2002 | 2 | 0 |
| Lithuania | 2003 | 5 | 0 |
| Lithuania | 2004 | 3 | 0 |
| Lithuania | 2005 | 6 | 0 |
| Lithuania | 2006 | 0 | 0 |
| Lithuania | 2007 | 8 | 0 |
| Lithuania | 2008 | 9 | 0 |
| Lithuania | 2009 | 7 | 0 |
| Lithuania | 2010 | 4 | 0 |
| Lithuania | 2011 | 5 | 0 |
| Lithuania | 2012 | 5 | 0 |
| Lithuania | 2013 | 1 | 0 |
| Total | | 82 | 0 |

== Honours ==
Žalgiris Vilnius

- A Lyga: 2014, 2015
- Lithuanian Football Cup: 1997, 2014, 2015

CSKA Moscow

- Russian Premier League: 2003, 2005, 2006
- Russian Cup: 2002, 2005, 2006, 2008, 2009, 2011
- Russian Super Cup: 2004, 2006, 2007, 2009
- UEFA Cup: 2005

Lithuania

- Baltic Cup: 1997, 1998

Individual

- Lithuanian Footballer of the Year: 2005
- In the list of 33 best football players of the championship of Russia: 2003, 2004, 2006
