= Andrei Perov =

Russian footballer

Personal information
- Full name: Andrei Aleksandrovich Perov
- Date of birth: 29 July 1981 (age 45)
- Height: 1.84 m (6 ft 1/2 in)
- Position: Midfielder

Youth career
- FC Krasnodar-2000 Krasnodar

Senior career*
Years	Team	Apps	(Gls)
2001	FC Krasnodar-2000 Krasnodar	4	(0)
2002–2003	FC Spartak Shchyolkovo	65	(6)
2004	FC Gazovik-Gazprom Izhevsk	40	(4)
2005	FC Khimki	39	(3)
2006–2007	FC Torpedo Moscow	30	(0)
2008–2010	FC KAMAZ Naberezhnye Chelny	77	(5)
2011–2012	FC Ural Sverdlovsk Oblast	0	(0)
2011–2012	→ FC Volgar-Gazprom Astrakhan (loan)	28	(1)
2012–2013	FC Gazovik Orenburg	20	(0)
2013–2014	FC Volgar Astrakhan	31	(1)
2014	FC Avangard Kursk	17	(1)
2015	FC Afips Afipsky	5	(0)
- * Club domestic league appearances and goals as of 14:09, 3 June 2015 (UTC)

Andrei Aleksandrovich Perov (Russian: Андрей Александрович Перов; born 29 July 1981) is a Russian former professional footballer. He made his debut in the Russian Premier League in 2006 for FC Torpedo Moscow.
