= Roin Oniani =

Georgian footballer

Personal information
- Date of birth: 14 June 1975 (age 51)
- Height: 1.82 m (5 ft 11 1/2 in)
- Positions: Defender; midfielder

Senior career*
Years	Team	Apps	(Gls)
1996–1999	FC Kolkheti Khobi	72	(7)
2000	FC Lokomotivi Tbilisi	5	(0)
2000	FC Dinamo Zugdidi	13	(4)
2001–2003	FC Lokomotivi Tbilisi	81	(7)
2004	FC Sioni Bolnisi	10	(3)
2004	FC Dila Gori	0	(0)
2005	FC Lokomotivi Tbilisi	39	(9)
2006	FC Dinamo Batumi	15	(2)
2006	FC Olimpi Rustavi	13	(0)
2007–2008	FC Zestaponi	50	(6)
2009	FC Mglebi Zugdidi	3	(0)
2009–2014	FC Baia Zugdidi	86	(5)
2014–2016	FC Kolkheti Khobi	19	(2)

International career
2001	Georgia	1	(0)
- * Club domestic league appearances and goals

Roin Oniani (born 14 June 1975) is a Georgian former professional footballer who played for the Georgia national team.
