= Dubensky (inhabited locality) =

Dubensky (Russian: Дубенский; masculine), Dubenskaya (Дубенская; feminine), or Dubenskoye (Дубенское; neuter) is the name of several rural localities in Russia:

- Dubensky (rural locality), a settlement in Dubensky Settlement Council of Belyayevsky District of Orenburg Oblast
- Dubenskoye, Krasnoyarsk Krai, a selo in Sineborsky Selsoviet of Shushensky District of Krasnoyarsk Krai
- Dubenskoye, Nizhny Novgorod Oblast, a selo in Dubensky Selsoviet of Vadsky District of Nizhny Novgorod Oblast
- Dubenskoye, Penza Oblast, a village in Yermolovsky Selsoviet of Penzensky District of Penza Oblast
