= Amir Kashiyev =

Russian footballer

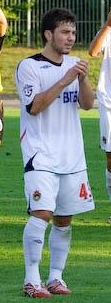

Personal information
- Full name: Amir Yuryevich Kashiyev
- Date of birth: 11 December 1989 (age 36)
- Place of birth: Russia, USSR
- Height: 1.72 m (5 ft 8 in)
- Position: Midfielder

Youth career
- PFC CSKA Moscow

Senior career*
Years	Team	Apps	(Gls)
2006–2008	PFC CSKA Moscow	0	(0)
2009	FC Nosta Novotroitsk	0	(0)
2010	FC Gazovik Orenburg	4	(0)
2010–2011	FC Dynamo Stavropol	29	(0)
2012	FC KAMAZ Naberezhnye Chelny	4	(0)
2013	FC Oktan Perm	7	(1)

International career
2005–2006	Russia U-17	10	(0)
- * Club domestic league appearances and goals

Amir Yuryevich Kashiyev (Russian: Амир Юрьевич Кашиев; born 11 December 1989) is a former Russian football midfielder.

== Career ==
In the 2005–06 season Kashiyev made his first team debut for CSKA Moscow in the Russian Cup in the Round of 16 against FC Spartak Kostroma. CSKA subsequently won the cup. He made his second and last CSKA senior appearance next season in another Russian Cup game against FC Mordovia Saransk.

He played in the Russian Football National League for FC KAMAZ Naberezhnye Chelny in 2012.

== International career ==
Kashiyev was an integral part of the Russian U-17 squad that won the 2006 UEFA U-17 Championship.
