= Zakhar Dubensky =

Russian footballer

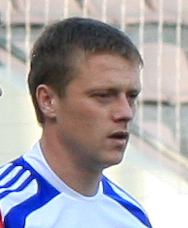

Personal information
- Full name: Zakhar Vladimirovich Dubensky
- Date of birth: 19 October 1978 (age 48)
- Place of birth: Volgograd, Russian SFSR, Soviet Union
- Height: 1.77 m (5 ft 9 1/2 in)
- Position: Centre midfielder

Youth career
- Rotor Volgograd

Senior career*
| Years | Team | Apps | (Gls) |
| 1995–2000 | FC Rotor Volgograd | 0 | (0) |
| 2000 | Torpedo-Viktoria | 21 | (4) |
| 2001 | KamAZ Naberezhnye Chelny | 22 | (1) |
| 2001–2004 | FC Rotor Volgograd | 18 | (0) |
| 2004 | FC Fakel Voronezh | 11 | (0) |
| 2005 | FC Olimpia Volgograd | 23 | (3) |
| 2006–2008 | FK Ventspils | 29 | (0) |
| 2009 | FC Alania Vladikavkaz | 13 | (0) |
| 2010 | FC Luch-Energiya Vladivostok | 26 | (0) |
| 2011–2012 | FC Volgar-Gazprom Astrakhan | 16 | (0) |
- * Club domestic league appearances and goals as of 16 June 2015 (UTC)

Zakhar Vladimirovich Dubensky (Russian: Захар Владимирович Дубенский; born 19 October 1978) is a retired Russian football midfielder. He last played for FC Volgar-Gazprom Astrakhan.

== Playing career ==
| 1995 | Rotor Volgograd | Premier League 1st level | 0/0 |
| 1996 | Rotor Volgograd | Premier League 1st level | 0/0 |
| 1997 | Rotor Volgograd | Premier League 1st level | 0/0 |
| 1998 | Rotor Volgograd | Premier League 1st level | 0/0 |
| 1999 | Rotor Volgograd | Premier League 1st level | 0/0 |
| 2000 | FC Torpedo-Viktoria Nizhny Novgorod | 2nd Division 3rd level | 21/4 |
| 2001 | KamAZ Naberezhnye Chelny | 2nd Division 3rd level | 22/1 |
| 2002 | Rotor Volgograd | Premier League 1st level | 9/0 |
| 2003 | Rotor Volgograd | Premier League 1st level | 6/0 |
| 2004 | Rotor Volgograd | Premier League 1st level | 3/0 |
| | FC Fakel Voronezh | 2nd Division (Center) 3rd level | 11/0 |
| 2005 | FC Olimpia Volgograd | 2nd Division (South) 3rd level | 23/3 |
| 2006 | FK Ventspils | Virsliga 1st level | 25/0 |
| 2007 | FK Ventspils | Virsliga 1st level | 4/0 |

* – played games and goals

== Honours ==
- Champion of Latvia: 2006, 2007, 2008
