= Andrei Utitskikh =

Russian footballer

Personal information
- Full name: Andrei Aleksandrovich Utitskikh
- Date of birth: 12 January 1986 (age 40)
- Place of birth: Novorossiysk, Krasnodar Krai, Russian SFSR
- Height: 1.79 m (5 ft 10 1/2 in)
- Position: Defender

Youth career
- FC Chernomorets Novorossiysk

Senior career*
| Years | Team | Apps | (Gls) |
| 2003–2004 | FC Chernomorets Novorossiysk | 8 | (0) |
| 2005–2007 | PFC CSKA Moscow | 0 | (0) |
| 2007 | → FC Sodovik Sterlitamak (loan) | 40 | (0) |
| 2008 | FC KAMAZ Naberezhnye Chelny | 17 | (0) |
| 2009 | FC MVD Rossii Moscow | 14 | (0) |
| 2009 | FC Metallurg Lipetsk | 1 | (0) |
| 2010 | FC KAMAZ Naberezhnye Chelny | 2 | (0) |
| 2011–2012 | FC Gubkin | 24 | (0) |
| 2012 | FC Spartak Gelendzhik | | |
| 2013 | FC Slavyansky Slavyansk-na-Kubani | 12 | (0) |
| 2013–2014 | FC Vityaz Krymsk | 21 | (1) |
| 2015 | FC Spartak Gelendzhik | | |
- * Club domestic league appearances and goals

Andrei Aleksandrovich Utitskikh (Russian: Андрей Александрович Утицких; born 12 January 1986) is a former Russian professional football player.

== Club career ==
He made his debut for PFC CSKA Moscow on 20 September 2006 in a Russian Cup game against FC Mordovia Saransk.

He played 5 seasons in the Russian Football National League for 5 different clubs.
