= Matthew Booth (soccer) =

South African footballer (born 1977)

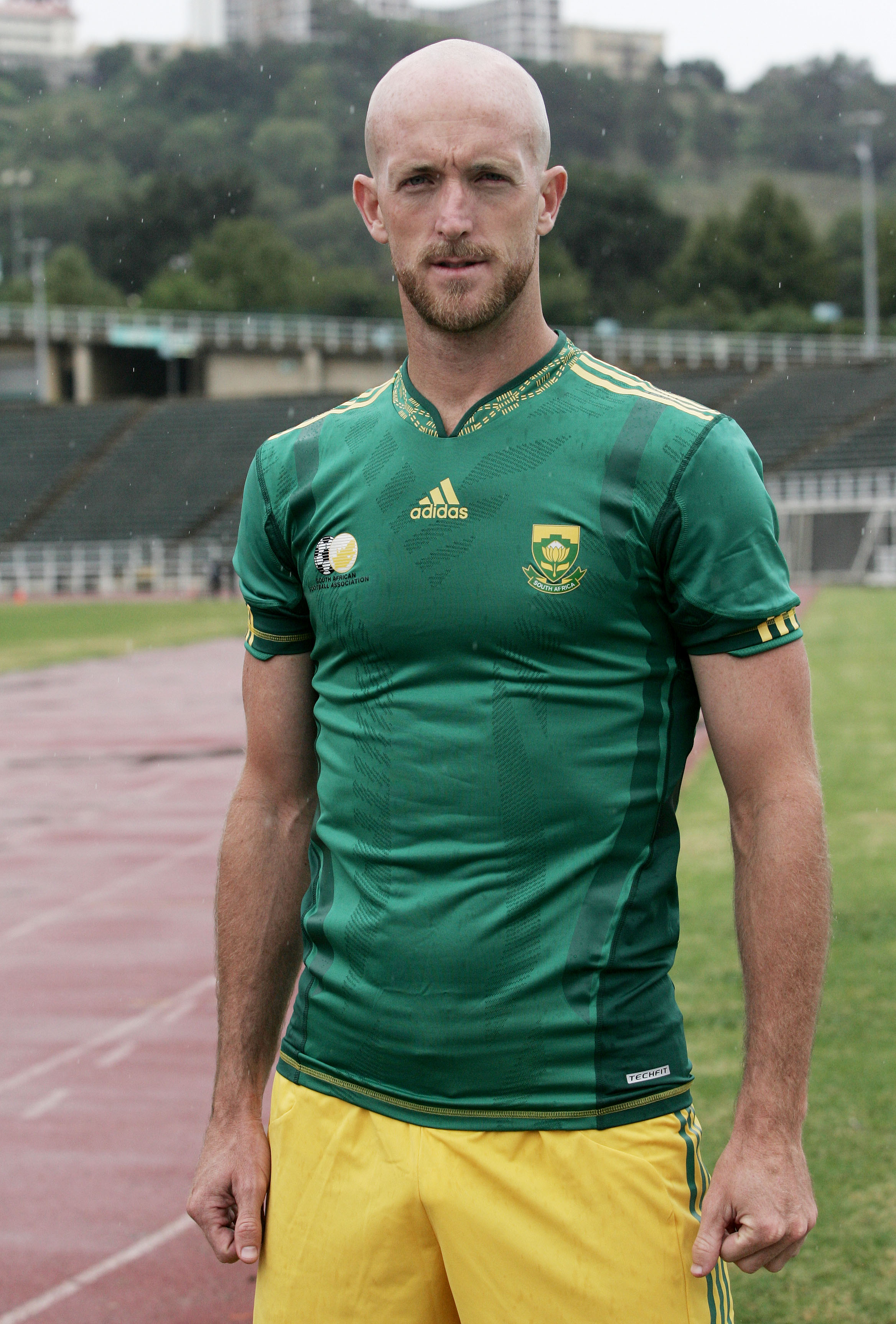

Personal information
- Full name: Matthew Paul Booth
- Date of birth: 14 March 1977 (age 49)
- Place of birth: Fish Hoek, South Africa
- Height: 1.99 m (6 ft 6 in)
- Position: Centre-back

Youth career
- 1982–1994: Fish Hoek AFC
- 1994–1996: Cape Town Spurs

Senior career*
Years	Team	Apps	(Gls)
1994–1998	Cape Town Spurs	92	(5)
1998–2002	Mamelodi Sundowns	114	(6)
2001	→ Wimbledon (loan)	0	(0)
2002–2004	Rostov	51	(1)
2004–2009	Krylia Sovetov	107	(7)
2009–2011	Mamelodi Sundowns	38	(0)
2011–2013	Ajax Cape Town	40	(5)
2013–2014	Bidvest Wits	19	(1)
Total		448	(24)

International career
1995–1997	South Africa U20	18	(0)
1998–2000	South Africa U23	35	(2)
1999–2010	South Africa	37	(1)
- * Club domestic league appearances and goals

Matthew Paul Booth (born 14 March 1977) is a South African former professional footballer who played as a centre-back. Booth spent the majority of his career in his home country, but also played in Russia for six years and briefly played in England for three months. Booth is remembered as a fan favourite among South African fans, who chanted "Booooooth" when he touched the ball, while British media outlets dubbed him as White Knight, as he was the only white player in the South Africa national team in this period.

== Early life and youth career ==
Booth was born in Fish Hoek to Paul and Anthea Booth. His father Paul was an engineer at the Cape Town city council, a semi-professional footballer and administrator for Fish Hoek AFC, while his mother Anthea was a legal secretary. Booth started playing football for Fish Hoek AFC in 1982 at the age of five. In 1993, he played in the Bayhill U19 tournament for Fish Hoek, where he was spotted by Cape Town Spurs coach Richard Gomes, who saw a lanky youngster flying into tackles halfheartedly and towering above the opposition's attackers and invited him to train with the club's youth. In 1994, shortly after he turned 17, he trained with the senior squad, which went on to win the league and the BobSave Super Bowl. At the time, he worked at a sports shop in Woodstock and would travel by train to Parow after work to train with the team at CR Vasco da Gama fields at the time, then travelled back to Fish Hoek after training.

== Career ==
=== Club ===
Booth started playing professionally in 1996, alongside experienced players like Shaun Bartlett and Craig Rosslee. Cape Town Spurs and Seven Stars were merged in 1999 to form Ajax Cape Town. He was deemed surplus to requirements at Ajax and wanted to sell him to newly formed Mother City. He fought back, and eventually joined Mamelodi Sundowns, staying for three seasons.

In 2001, Booth moved to England as he was loaned out to First Division side Wimbledon, but he never made an appearance for the first team, and was only used in reserve team matches. He was later quoted as saying that his stint at Wimbledon was "not a happy time because the club was in turmoil over the move to Milton Keynes". In 2002, he moved to Russia to represent both Rostov and later Krylia Sovetov, playing with and against players such as Branislav Ivanović, Vágner Love and Jan Koller.

Booth retired from professional football on 19 June 2014, even though he was given an option to renew his playing contract.

=== International ===
Booth made his debut for South Africa on 20 February 1999, against Botswana at the Cosafa Castle Cup. He made thirty-seven appearances for the national side, scoring one goal. Booth missed out on the 2002 FIFA World Cup due to a knee injury, but was a member of the 2010 FIFA World Cup team (that qualified as hosts of the competition), despite remaining an unused substitute for all three group stage matches. He also captained the under-23 side at the 2000 Summer Olympics.

Due to his height, Booth is considered one of the most important players when meeting opponents with tall players.

== Personal life ==
Booth is married to Sonia Bonneventia, a businesswoman and former model. The couple have two children together.

In 2014, Booth saved a woman from being beaten on Cape Town's nightclub strip on Long Street early on a Saturday morning. Booth had been playing for Wits in an Absa Premiership game against Ajax Cape Town, which they lost 1–0, hosted at Cape Town Stadium on the previous Friday night. After using an ATM and walking back to his friends, he saw a man assaulting the woman and rushed to her assistance. The attacker shoved Booth, who toppled onto a store's window ledge which had spikes to prevent people sitting on the ledge. Members of the Central City Improvement District took the attacker away. Booth returned to his hotel where the team doctor attended to his injuries.

Booth owns junior coaching clinics at multiple public schools. He has also done some television work for the South African Broadcasting Corporation as an analyst and some writing for The Sowetan. Booth has also registered to do a BA degree through the University of South Africa.

In early November 2022, Matthew’s wife Sonia Booth exposed him on instagram regarding infidelity.

== Career statistics ==
=== Club ===
As of match played 22 November 2008

Appearances and goals by club, season and competition
Club	Season	League			National Cup		Continental		Other		Total	
Club	Season	Division	Apps	Goals	Apps	Goals	Apps	Goals	Apps	Goals	Apps	Goals
Rostov	2002	Russian Premier League	8	0	4	0	–		–		12	0
Rostov	2003	Russian Premier League	28	1	4	0	–		–		32	1
Rostov	2004	Russian Premier League	15	0	0	0	–		–		15	0
Rostov	Total		51	1	8	0	0	0	0	0	59	1
Krylia Sovetov	2004	Russian Premier League	8	1	4	0	–		–		12	1
Krylia Sovetov	2005	Russian Premier League	18	1	2	0	2	0	–		22	1
Krylia Sovetov	2006	Russian Premier League	28	3	4	0	–		–		32	3
Krylia Sovetov	2007	Russian Premier League	28	2	0	0	–		–		28	2
Krylia Sovetov	2008	Russian Premier League	25	0	1	0	–		–		26	0
Krylia Sovetov	Total		107	7	11	0	2	0	0	0	120	7
Career total			158	8	19	0	2	0	0	0	179	8

=== International ===
Appearances and goals by national team and year
National team	Year	Apps	Goals
South Africa	1999	3	0
South Africa	2000	1	0
South Africa	2001	6	1
South Africa	2002	4	0
South Africa	2003	0	0
South Africa	2004	0	0
South Africa	2005	1	0
South Africa	2006	0	0
South Africa	2007	0	0
South Africa	2008	3	0
South Africa	2009	8	0
South Africa	2010	2	0
Total		28	1

Scores and results list South Africa's goal tally first, score column indicates score after each Booth goal.

List of international goals scored by Matthew Booth
No.	Date	Venue	Opponent	Score	Result	Competition
1	14 July 2001	Durban, South Africa	Malawi	1–0	2–0	2002 FIFA World Cup qualification

== Honours ==
Cape Town Spurs

- Bob Save Super Bowl: 1994

Mamelodi Sundowns

- Premier Soccer League: 1998–99, 1999–2000
- Rothmans Cup: 1999
- Charity Spectacular: 2000
- Bob Save Super Bowl: 1998

Individual

- Ajax Cape Town Player of the Season: 2013
