= Almir Kayumov =

Russian footballer and referee

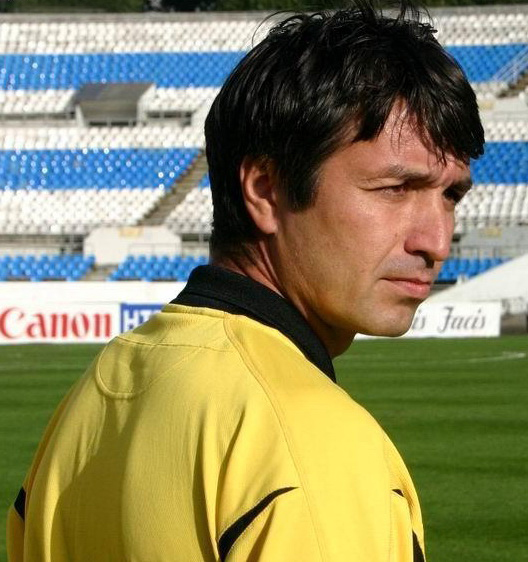

Personal information
- Full name: Almir Izmailovich Kayumov
- Date of birth: 30 December 1964
- Place of birth: Moscow, Soviet Union
- Date of death: 7 August 2013 (aged 48)
- Place of death: Smolensk, Russia
- Height: 1.78 m (5 ft 10 in)
- Position: Defender

Senior career*
Years	Team	Apps	(Gls)
1981–1987	FC Spartak Moscow	48	(0)
1988–1989	FC SKA Rostov-on-Don	46	(0)
1990	FC Rotor Volgograd	5	(0)
1991	FC Spartak Moscow	0	(0)
1992	Kuopion Palloseura	26	(0)
1993	Daewoo Royals	16	(0)
1994–1995	FC Lada Togliatti	50	(1)
1996	FC Dynamo-Gazovik Tyumen	17	(0)
1997–1998	FC Neftekhimik Nizhnekamsk	38	(0)
- * Club domestic league appearances and goals as of 4 October 2008 (UTC)

Almir Izmailovich Kayumov (Russian: Альмир Измайлович Каюмов; 30 December 1964 – 7 August 2013) was a Russian football player and referee.

== Career ==
Kayumov played for FC Neftekhimik Nizhnekamsk, FC Lada Togliatti, Spartak Moscow, Rotor Volgograd, SKA Rostov-on-Don, in Russia, the Daewoo Royals in South Korea, and Kuopion Palloseura in Finland. He played 6 games in the UEFA Cup 1986–87 for FC Spartak Moscow.

On November 9, 2009, it was reported that Kayumov attempted to commit suicide by jumping out of his apartment window. Police negotiators talked him down, however, and he was brought to a psychiatric hospital. Kayumov later denied this, stating that he had just an ordinary treatment.

== Death ==
Kayumov died on 7 August 2013, when he was hit by a GAZelle truck in Smolensk. According to investigators, his death was a suicide as the surveillance camera footage showed that he jumped in front of the truck.

== Honours ==
- Soviet Top League champion: 1987.
- Soviet Top League runner-up: 1984, 1985.
- Soviet Top League bronze: 1986.
- Soviet Cup winner: 1992.
