= Sergei Zhideyev =

Russian footballer

Personal information
- Full name: Sergei Alekseyevich Zhideyev
- Date of birth: 2 April 1987 (age 39)
- Place of birth: Kursk, Russian SFSR
- Height: 1.89 m (6 ft 2 1/2 in)
- Position: Goalkeeper

Senior career*
| Years | Team | Apps | (Gls) |
| 2003 | FC Trudovyye Rezervy Moscow | | |
| 2004–2009 | PFC CSKA Moscow | 0 | (0) |
| 2008 | → FC Dynamo Stavropol (loan) | 31 | (0) |
| 2009 | → FC MVD Rossii Moscow (loan) | 5 | (0) |
| 2014–2017 | FC Avangard Kursk | 22 | (0) |
- * Club domestic league appearances and goals

Sergei Alekseyevich Zhideyev (Russian: Серге́й Алексеевич Жидеев; born 2 April 1987) is a former Russian professional football player.

== Club career ==
He played in the Russian Football National League for FC MVD Rossii Moscow in 2009.
