= Valeri Safonov =

Russian footballer

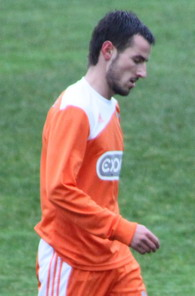

Personal information
- Full name: Valeri Valeryevich Safonov
- Date of birth: 13 May 1987 (age 39)
- Place of birth: Istra, Russian SFSR
- Height: 1.74 m (5 ft 8 1/2 in)
- Positions: Defender; midfielder

Youth career
- PFC CSKA Moscow

Senior career*
Years	Team	Apps	(Gls)
2004–2007	PFC CSKA Moscow	0	(0)
2008	FC Istra	31	(0)
2009	FC Krasnodar	12	(0)
2009–2010	FC Zhemchuzhina-Sochi	20	(0)
2011–2012	FC Istra	15	(0)
2012	PFC Spartak Nalchik	0	(0)
2013–2014	FC Sokol Saratov	7	(1)
2014–2015	FC Sochi	7	(0)
- * Club domestic league appearances and goals

Valeri Valeryevich Safonov (Russian: Валерий Валерьевич Сафонов; born 13 May 1987) is a former Russian professional footballer.

== Club career ==
He played two seasons in the Russian Football National League for FC Krasnodar and FC Zhemchuzhina-Sochi.

== Honours ==
- Russian Cup winner with PFC CSKA Moscow: 2006 (played 2 games in the tournament).

== Life ==
After his retirement in 2015 he moved to Phuket, Thailand where he still lives. He still plays football but not at the professional level. He is a football coach for kids.
