= Dmitry Tikhonov =

Russian footballer

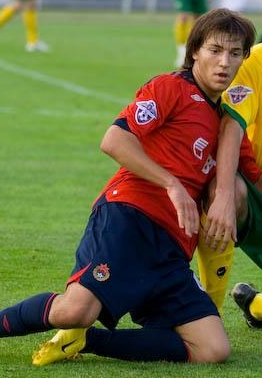

Personal information
- Full name: Dmitry Vladimirovich Tikhonov
- Date of birth: 13 September 1988 (age 38)
- Place of birth: Moscow, Russian SFSR
- Height: 1.80 m (5 ft 11 in)
- Position: Forward

Youth career
- PFC CSKA Moscow

Senior career*
Years	Team	Apps	(Gls)
2004–2009	PFC CSKA Moscow	2	(0)
2008	→ FC Sportakademklub Moscow (loan)	33	(3)
2009	→ FC Torpedo-ZIL Moscow (loan)	23	(3)
2010	FC Sportakademklub Moscow	26	(5)
2011–2012	FC Mashuk-KMV Pyatigorsk	16	(0)
2013	FC Podolye Podolsky district	1	(0)
2013–2014	FC Volga Tver	27	(2)
- * Club domestic league appearances and goals

Dmitry Vladimirovich Tikhonov (Russian: Дмитрий Владимирович Тихонов; born 13 September 1988) is a former footballer from Russia. His position was striker.
