= Sergei Grichenkov =

Russian footballer

Personal information
- Full name: Sergei Valeryevich Grichenkov
- Date of birth: 8 July 1986 (age 40)
- Place of birth: Moscow, Russia
- Height: 1.73 m (5 ft 8 in)
- Position: Defender

Youth career
- PFC CSKA Moscow

Senior career*
Years	Team	Apps	(Gls)
2002–2006	PFC CSKA Moscow	0	(0)
2006	FC SKA Rostov-on-Don	23	(0)
2007	FC Sodovik Sterlitamak	14	(0)
2008	FC Daugava	11	(1)
2009	FC Lokomotiv-2 Moscow	21	(0)
2010	FC Molniya Moscow		
2012	FC Molniya Moscow		
2013	FC Dzhileks Klimovsk		
2013	FC Zenit Moscow		
2014	FC Prialit Reutov		
- * Club domestic league appearances and goals

Sergei Valeryevich Grichenkov (Russian: Серге́й Валерьевич Гриченков; born 8 July 1986) is a former Russian professional footballer.

== Club career ==
He made his debut for PFC CSKA Moscow on 6 July 2005 in a Russian Cup game against FC Torpedo Vladimir. He made his first start on 15 March 2006 in the next Russian Cup round against FC Spartak Kostroma.

He played in the Russian Football National League for FC Sodovik Sterlitamak in 2007.

== Honours ==
- Russian Cup winner: 2006.
