= Kirill Kochubei =

Russian footballer

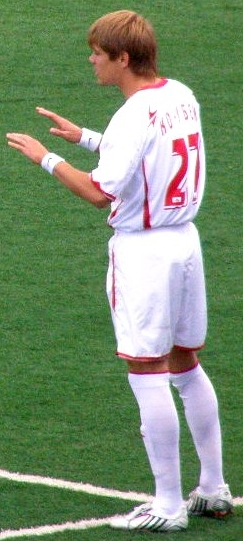

Personal information
- Full name: Kirill Aleksandrovich Kochubei
- Date of birth: 6 October 1986 (age 40)
- Place of birth: Nalchik, Russian SFSR
- Height: 1.82 m (6 ft 0 in)
- Position: Right midfielder

Youth career
- FC Chernomorets Novorossiysk
- PFC CSKA Moscow

Senior career*
Years	Team	Apps	(Gls)
2002–2006	PFC CSKA Moscow	4	(0)
2007	→ FC Anzhi Makhachkala (loan)	37	(2)
2008–2009	PFC Spartak Nalchik	11	(1)
2008	→ FC Anzhi Makhachkala (loan)	17	(1)
2009	→ FC Chernomorets Novorossiysk (loan)	28	(0)
2010	FC Rotor Volgograd	15	(0)
2011–2012	FC SKA-Energiya Khabarovsk	27	(1)
2012–2013	FC Chernomorets Novorossiysk	29	(9)
2013	FC Luch-Energiya Vladivostok	3	(0)
2013–2016	FC Chernomorets Novorossiysk	81	(18)
2016–2017	FC Armavir	24	(3)
2017–2018	FC Chernomorets Novorossiysk	26	(4)

International career
2005	Russia U-19	8	(2)
2007	Russia U-21	1	(0)
- * Club domestic league appearances and goals

Kirill Aleksandrovich Kochubei (Russian: Кирилл Александрович Кочубей; born 6 October 1986) is a Russian former football midfielder.

== Club career ==
He made two appearances (67 mins.) for CSKA Moscow in UEFA Champions League 2006-07.
