= Sergei Pravosud =

Russian footballer

Personal information
- Full name: Sergei Valeryevich Pravosud
- Date of birth: 18 February 1986 (age 40)
- Place of birth: Novhorod-Siverskyi, Ukrainian SSR
- Height: 1.83 m (6 ft 0 in)
- Positions: Striker; attacking midfielder

Youth career
- 1996–2001: PFC CSKA Moscow

Senior career*
Years	Team	Apps	(Gls)
2002–2009	PFC CSKA Moscow	5	(0)
2006	→ FC Shinnik Yaroslavl (loan)	1	(0)
2006	→ FC Sodovik Sterlitamak (loan)	18	(4)
2007	→ FC Sibir Novosibirsk (loan)	13	(1)
2008	→ FC SKA-Energiya Khabarovsk (loan)	12	(0)
2009	→ FC Istra (loan)	13	(2)
2010	FC Nara-ShBFR Naro-Fominsk	10	(0)
2011–2013	FC Olimp Fryazino		
- * Club domestic league appearances and goals

Sergei Valeryevich Pravosud (Russian: Серге́й Валерьевич Правосуд; born 18 February 1986) is a former Russian professional football player.

== Club career ==
He made his debut in the Russian Premier League in 2005 for PFC CSKA Moscow.

== Honours ==
- Russian Premier League champion: 2005.
- Russian Cup winner: 2006 (played in the early stages of the 2005/06 tournament for CSKA).
