= 2007 PFC CSKA Moscow season =

PFC CSKA Moscow
2007 season
- Manager: Valery Gazzaev
- Russian Premier League: 3rd
- Russian Super Cup: Winners
- 2006–07 Russian Cup: Sixth round vs Krylia Sovetov
- 2007–08 Russian Cup: Progressed to 2008 season
- UEFA Cup: Round of 32 vs Maccabi Haifa
- Champions League: Group stage
- Top goalscorer: League: Vágner Love; Jô (13); All: Jô (18)

The 2007 Russian football season, saw CSKA Moscow competed in the Russian Premier League, Russian Super Cup, Russian Cup, the UEFA Cup and the UEFA Champions League. CSKA were defending Premier League champions but could not successfully defend it, finishing 3rd. They also failed to defend their 2005/06 Cup crown, getting knocked out at the Sixth Round stage by Krylia Sovetov during the 2006/07 Cup. They did however win all their games from the 2007/08 cup that were played in 2007, progressing to the semi-finals by the end of the 2007 season. CSKA did however retain their Russian Super Cup. After being eliminated to the UEFA Cup during the 2006/07 European campaign, they were knocked out by Maccabi Haifa at the Round of 32. CSKA qualified directly for the group stage of the 2007–08 UEFA Champions League, however they did not make it out of the group, after being drawn with Inter Milan, Fenerbahçe and PSV Eindhoven, finishing bottom of the group with 1 point.

== Squad ==
As of match played 12 December 2007

Number	Name	Nationality	Position	Date of birth (age)	Signed from	Signed in	Contract ends	Apps.	Goals
Goalkeepers
1	Veniamin Mandrykin	(Russia)	GK	30 August 1981 (aged 26)	Alania Vladikavkaz	2002		95	0
33	Yevgeny Pomazan	(Russia)	GK	31 January 1989 (aged 18)	loan from Kuban Krasnodar	2007		1	0
35	Igor Akinfeev	(Russia)	GK	8 April 1986 (aged 21)	Academy	2003		170	0
51	Sergei Zhideyev	(Russia)	GK	2 April 1987 (aged 20)	Trudovyye Rezervy Moscow	2002		0	0
60	Aleksandr Abakumov	(Russia)	GK	8 July 1989 (aged 18)	Academy	2007		0	0
Defenders
2	Deividas Šemberas	(Lithuania)	DF	2 August 1978 (aged 29)	Dynamo Moscow	2002		219	0
4	Sergei Ignashevich	(Russia)	DF	14 July 1979 (aged 28)	Lokomotiv Moscow	2004		154	14
6	Aleksei Berezutski	(Russia)	DF	20 June 1982 (aged 25)	Chernomorets Novorossiysk	2001		225	3
15	Chidi Odiah	(Nigeria)	DF	17 December 1983 (aged 23)	Sheriff Tiraspol	2004		62	4
21	Ratinho	(Brazil)	DF	17 September 1987 (aged 20)	loan from Corinthians	2007		11	1
24	Vasili Berezutski	(Russia)	DF	20 June 1982 (aged 25)	Torpedo-ZIL	2002		167	6
38	Oleg Malyukov	(Russia)	DF	16 January 1985 (aged 22)	Academy	2001		0	0
39	Ivan Taranov	(Russia)	DF	22 June 1986 (aged 21)	Chernomorets Novorossiysk	2002		42	1
41	Valeri Safonov	(Russia)	DF	13 May 1987 (aged 20)	Academy	2004		3	0
50	Anton Grigoryev	(Russia)	DF	13 December 1985 (aged 21)	Academy	2004		28	0
55	Vadim Gagloyev	(Russia)	DF	18 January 1989 (aged 18)	Academy	2006		1	0
57	Sergei Gorelov	(Russia)	DF	29 April 1985 (aged 22)	Academy	2001		4	0
Midfielders
5	Ramón	(Brazil)	MF	24 May 1988 (aged 19)	Corinthians	2007		25	1
7	Daniel Carvalho	(Brazil)	MF	1 March 1983 (aged 24)	Internacional	2003	2009	114	26
8	Rolan Gusev	(Russia)	MF	17 September 1977 (aged 30)	Dynamo Moscow	2002		198	41
11	Pavel Mamayev	(Russia)	MF	17 September 1988 (aged 19)	Torpedo Moscow	2007		5	0
17	Miloš Krasić	(Serbia)	MF	1 November 1984 (aged 23)	Vojvodina	2004		135	11
18	Yuri Zhirkov	(Russia)	MF	20 August 1983 (aged 24)	Spartak Tambov	2004		162	17
20	Dudu	(Brazil)	MF	15 April 1983 (aged 24)	Rennes	2005		95	9
22	Evgeni Aldonin	(Russia)	MF	22 January 1980 (aged 27)	Rotor Volgograd	2004		176	8
25	Elvir Rahimić	(Bosnia and Herzegovina)	MF	4 April 1976 (aged 31)	Anzhi Makhachkala	2001		260	4
36	Aleksei Blokha	(Russia)	MF	28 April 1987 (aged 20)	Academy	2004		0	0
43	Amir Kashiyev	(Russia)	MF	11 December 1989 (aged 18)	Academy	2006		2	0
54	Aleksei Vasilyev	(Russia)	MF	28 October 1987 (aged 20)	Academy	2004		2	0
56	Vladimir Tatarchuk	(Russia)	MF	6 October 1986 (aged 21)	Academy	2004		3	0
88	Caner Erkin	(Turkey)	MF	4 October 1988 (aged 19)	Manisaspor	2007		14	0
Forwards
9	Vágner Love	(Brazil)	FW	11 June 1984 (aged 23)	Palmeiras	2004		130	59
10	Jô	(Brazil)	FW	20 March 1987 (aged 20)	Corinthians	2006		67	40
19	Dawid Janczyk	(Poland)	FW	23 September 1987 (aged 20)	Legia Warsaw	2007		15	2
42	Dmitry Tikhonov	(Russia)	FW	13 September 1988 (aged 19)	Academy	2004		5	1
44	Nikita Burmistrov	(Russia)	FW	6 July 1989 (aged 18)	Academy	2007		6	0
47	Igor Kuzmin	(Russia)	FW	13 January 1989 (aged 18)	Academy	2006		0	0
48	Renat Miftahov	(Russia)	FW	9 February 1989 (aged 18)	Academy	2007		0	0
Away on loan
37	Kirill Kochubei	(Russia)	MF	6 October 1986 (aged 21)	Chernomorets Novorossiysk	2002		10	0
Players who left during the season
52	Grigoriy Dolmatov	(Russia)	DF	13 March 1987 (aged 20)	Academy	2006		0	0
68	Vasili Penyasov	(Russia)	DF	13 March 1987 (aged 20)	Energetik Uren	2007		0	0

=== Out on loan ===
Note: Flags indicate national team as defined under FIFA eligibility rules; some limited exceptions apply. Players may hold more than one non-FIFA nationality.

No. / Pos. / Nation / Player; 37 / MF / RUS / Kirill Kochubei (at Anzhi Makhachkala)	No. / Pos. / Nation / Player

== Transfers ==
=== Winter ===
In: Note: Flags indicate national team as defined under FIFA eligibility rules; some limited exceptions apply. Players may hold more than one non-FIFA nationality.

No.	Pos.	Nation	Player
5	MF	BRA	Ramón (loan from (Brazil) Corinthians)
68	DF	RUS	Vasili Penyasov (from (Russia) Energetik Uren)
88	MF	TUR	Caner Erkin (from (Turkey) Manisaspor)

Out: Note: Flags indicate national team as defined under FIFA eligibility rules; some limited exceptions apply. Players may hold more than one non-FIFA nationality.

No.	Pos.	Nation	Player
9	FW	CRO	Ivica Olić (to (Germany) Hamburger SV)
37	MF	RUS	Kirill Kochubei (loan to (Russia) Anzhi Makhachkala)
40	FW	RUS	Aleksandr Salugin (to (Russia) Krylia Sovetov Samara)
46	MF	RUS	Andrei Utitskikh (to (Russia) KAMAZ Naberezhnye Chelny)
77	GK	RUS	Vladimir Gabulov (to (Russia) Kuban Krasnodar)
89	FW	AZE	Vagif Javadov (to (Azerbaijan) Qarabağ)

=== Summer ===
In: Note: Flags indicate national team as defined under FIFA eligibility rules; some limited exceptions apply. Players may hold more than one non-FIFA nationality.

No.	Pos.	Nation	Player
11	MF	RUS	Pavel Mamayev (from (Russia) Torpedo Moscow)
19	FW	POL	Dawid Janczyk (from (Poland) Legia Warsaw)
21	DF	BRA	Ratinho (loan from (Brazil) Corinthians)
33	GK	RUS	Yevgeny Pomazan (loan from (Russia) Kuban Krasnodar)

Out: Note: Flags indicate national team as defined under FIFA eligibility rules; some limited exceptions apply. Players may hold more than one non-FIFA nationality.

No.	Pos.	Nation	Player
52	DF	RUS	Grigoriy Dolmatov
68	DF	RUS	Vasili Penyasov (to (Russia) Sodovik Sterlitamak)

== Competitions ==
=== UEFA Cup ===
==== Knockout stage ====
14 February 2007 Round of 32 1st leg	CSKA Moscow (Russia)	0 – 0	(Israel) Maccabi Haifa	Vladikavkaz, Russia
20:00 MSK (UTC+3)	Carvalho (yellow card) 68'; Šemberas (yellow card) 88'; Rahimić (yellow card) 90'	Report	Xavier (yellow card) 17'; Suan (yellow card) 28'; Katan (yellow card) 68'; Davidovich (yellow card) 75'	Stadium: Republican Spartak Stadium; Referee: Darko Ceferin (Slovenia)

22 February 2007 Round of 32 2nd leg	Maccabi Haifa (Israel)	1 – 0 (1 – 0 agg.)	(Russia) CSKA Moscow	Tel Aviv, Israel
21:45 MSK (UTC+3)	Colautti 13'; Meshumar (yellow card) 17'; Megrelashvili (yellow card) 60'	Report	Šemberas (yellow card) 32'; Aldonin (yellow card) 54'	Stadium: Bloomfield Stadium; Referee: Gerald Lehner (Austria)

=== Russian Super Cup ===
3 March 2007
16:00 MSK

CSKA Moscow	4 – 2	Spartak Moscow
Vágner Love 1'; Ignashevich 51'; Jô 63', 79'	Report	Bazhenov 47'; Torbinskiy 61'

Luzhniki, Moscow
Attendance: 45,000
Referee: Aleksandr Gvardis (Kaliningrad)

CSKA Moscow:
GK	35	(Russia) Igor Akinfeev
DF	4	(Russia) Sergei Ignashevich (c)	(yellow card) 90'
DF	6	(Russia) Aleksei Berezutski
DF	24	(Russia) Vasili Berezutski
MF	17	(Serbia) Miloš Krasić		(substituted off) 90'
MF	18	(Russia) Yuri Zhirkov
MF	20	(Brazil) Dudu Cearense
MF	22	(Russia) Evgeni Aldonin		(substituted off) 46'
MF	25	(Bosnia and Herzegovina) Elvir Rahimić
FW	9	(Brazil) Vágner Love		(substituted off) 89'
FW	10	(Brazil) Jô	(yellow card) 73'
Substitutes:
GK	1	(Russia) Veniamin Mandrykin
DF	2	(Lithuania) Deividas Šemberas		(substituted on) 46'
DF	39	(Russia) Ivan Taranov		(substituted on) 90'
DF	50	(Russia) Anton Grigoryev
DF	57	(Russia) Sergei Gorelov
MF	5	(Brazil) Ramón		(substituted on) 89'
MF	8	(Russia) Rolan Gusev
Manager:
(Russia) Valery Gazzaev Assistant referees: (Russia) Valery Bulygin (Russia) Ildar Zaripov; Fourth official: (Russia) Aleksei Nikolaev

Spartak Moscow:
GK	30	(Poland) Wojciech Kowalewski	(yellow card) 49'
DF	2	(Brazil) Antônio Géder		(substituted off) 46'
DF	3	(Austria) Martin Stranzl
DF	13	(Czech Republic) Martin Jiránek
DF	49	(Russia) Roman Shishkin
MF	5	(Brazil) Mozart	(yellow card) 49'
MF	7	(Russia) Denis Boyarintsev		(substituted off) 46'
MF	9	(Russia) Yegor Titov (c)
MF	15	(Czech Republic) Radoslav Kováč
FW	32	(Russia) Nikita Bazhenov		(substituted off) 82'
FW	40	(Russia) Artyom Dzyuba
Substitutes:
GK	1	(Russia) Dmitri Khomich
DF	34	(Russia) Renat Sabitov
DF	36	(Russia) Fyodor Kudryashov
MF	11	(Russia) Aleksandr Pavlenko		(substituted on) 82'
MF	14	(Russia) Dmitri Torbinski		(substituted on) 46'
MF	25	(Ukraine) Maksym Kalynychenko		(substituted on) 46'
FW	18	(Russia) Aleksandr Prudnikov
Manager:
(Russia) Vladimir Fedotov

=== Russian Premier League ===
==== Results by round ====
Round	1	2	3	4	5	6	7	8	9	10	11	12	13	14	15	16	17	18	19	20	21	22	23	24	25	26	27	28	29	30
Ground	H	A	H	A	H	A	H	A	H	A	H	A	H	A	H	H	A	H	A	H	A	H	A	H	A	H	A	H	A	A
Result	W	D	W	D	W	L	W	D	D	D	W	L	D	L	D	L	W	D	D	W	D	W	D	W	L	W	W	W	W	W

Updated to match(es) played on 11 November 2007. Source: See Results
A = Away; H = Home; W = Win; D = Draw; L = Loss

==== Results ====
11 March 2007 1	CSKA Moscow	3 – 1	Rubin Kazan	Moscow
MSK (UTC+3)	Šemberas (yellow card) 17'; Aldonin (yellow card) 28' (goal) 45+2'; Ignashevich 52' (pen.); Jô 63'	Report	Ryazantsev (yellow card) 23'; Gabriel 29'; Noboa (yellow card) 33'; Fyodorov (yellow card) 51'	Stadium: Luzhniki Stadium; Attendance: 9,000; Referee: Eduard Malyi

18 March 2007 2	Dynamo Moscow	1 – 1	CSKA Moscow	Moscow
14:00 MSK (UTC+3)	Tochilin (yellow card) 43'; Klimavičius (yellow card) 62'; Fernández (red card) 77'; Semshov (yellow card) 79'; Pimenov 86'	Report	A.Berezutski (yellow card) 48'; Vágner Love 61'; Dudu (yellow card) 85'	Stadium: Dynamo Stadium; Attendance: 16,500; Referee: Valentin Ivanov

31 March 2007 3	CSKA Moscow	2 – 0	Lokomotiv Moscow	Moscow
16:00 MSK (UTC+4)	Ramón 1'; Zhirkov (yellow card) 27'; Grigoryev (yellow card) 45'; Vágner Love 83'	Report	Spahić (yellow card) 25'; Rodolfo (yellow card) 62'; Fininho (yellow card) 90'	Stadium: Luzhniki Stadium; Attendance: 25,000; Referee: Eric Braamhaar

8 April 2007 4	Khimki	1 – 1	CSKA Moscow	Khimki
15:00 MSK (UTC+4)	Tikhonov (yellow card) 26'; Vorobyov 46'; Blatnjak (yellow card) 62'	Report	Rahimić (yellow card) 33'; Krasić 61'; Gusev (yellow card) 65'	Stadium: Rodina Stadium; Attendance: 9,700; Referee: Eduard Malyi

15 April 2007 5	CSKA Moscow	2 – 0	Spartak Nalchik	Moscow
14:00 MSK (UTC+4)	Jô 70'; Krasić 81'	Report	Džudović (yellow card) 60'	Stadium: Luzhniki Stadium; Attendance: 14,500; Referee: Aleksandr Yevstigneyev

22 April 2007 6	Moscow	2 – 1	CSKA Moscow	Moscow
MSK (UTC+4)	Barrientos (yellow card) 22' (goal) 28'; Bracamonte (yellow card) 43'; Semak 48'; Epureanu (yellow card) 55'; Okoronkwo (yellow card) 89'	Report	Gusev (yellow card) 32'; Rahimić (yellow card) 40'; Vágner Love 43'	Stadium: Eduard Streltsov Stadium; Attendance: 9,000; Referee: Aleksandr Gvardis

29 April 2007 7	CSKA Moscow	3 – 1	Saturn	Moscow
14:00 MSK (UTC+4)	V.Berezutski 21'; Zhirkov 24' (yellow card) 40'; Jô (yellow card) 32'; Vágner Love (yellow card) 68' (goal) 81'	Report	Gogua (yellow card) 19'; Lebedenko 31'; Gyan (yellow card) 60'; Karyaka (yellow card) 65'	Stadium: Luzhniki Stadium; Attendance: 8,000; Referee: Valentin Ivanov

6 May 2007 8	Rostov	1 – 1	CSKA Moscow	Rostov-on-Don
19:00 MSK (UTC+4)	Kanyenda (yellow card) 34'; Kalachev (yellow card) 73'; Pjanović 86'; Vještica (yellow card) 90'	Report	Aldonin (yellow card) 20'; Rahimić (yellow card) 41'; Jô 57'; Šemberas (yellow card) 69'; Zhirkov (yellow card) 71'; V.Berezutski (red card) 84'	Stadium: Olimp-2; Attendance: 12,000; Referee: Aleksandr Yevstigneyev

12 May 2007 9	CSKA Moscow	1 – 1	Spartak Moscow	Moscow
14:00 MSK (UTC+4)	Krasić 14' (yellow card) 14'; Jô (yellow card) 77'	Report	Titov (yellow card) 43'; Pavlyuchenko (yellow card) 43'; Torbinski (yellow card) 56'; Bystrov 69'; Jiránek (yellow card) 87'; Kalynychenko (yellow card) 90'	Stadium: Luzhniki Stadium; Attendance: 55,000; Referee: Igor Zakharov

20 May 2007 10	Amkar Perm	1 – 1	CSKA Moscow	Perm
16:00 MSK (UTC+4)	Belorukov (yellow card) 15'; Volkov (yellow card) 83'; Drinčić 89' (yellow card) 90'	Report	Zhirkov (yellow card) 35'; Šemberas (yellow card) 68'; Rahimić (yellow card) 82'; Vágner Love 85'	Stadium: Zvezda Stadium; Attendance: 19,000; Referee: Eduard Malyi

26 May 2007 11	CSKA Moscow	2 – 0	Zenit St. Petersburg	Moscow
14:00 MSK (UTC+4)	Aldonin (yellow card) 31'; Jô 60', 67'; Šemberas (yellow card) 80'	Report	Tymoshchuk (yellow card) 69'; Domínguez (yellow card) 70'; Križanac (yellow card) 81'	Stadium: Luzhniki Stadium; Attendance: 24,000; Referee: Markus Merk

10 June 2007 12	Luch-Energiya	4 – 0	CSKA Moscow	Vladivostok
12:00 MSK (UTC+4)	Tikhonovetsky 5'; Ivanov 15'; R.Ajinjal (yellow card) 57'; Shtanyuk (yellow card) 62'; Bazayev 67', 84' (yellow card) 84'; B.Ajinjal (yellow card) 69'	Report	Vágner Love (yellow card) 42'; A.Berezutski (yellow card) 63'; Ignashevich (yellow card) 90'	Stadium: Dynamo Stadium; Attendance: 10,000; Referee: Alexander Gonchar

16 June 2007 13	CSKA Moscow	0 – 0	Tom Tomsk	Moscow
14:30 MSK (UTC+4)	Ramón (yellow card) 29'; Rahimić (yellow card) 36'; V.Berezutski (yellow card) 90'	Report	Bugayev (yellow card) 74'	Stadium: Luzhniki Stadium; Attendance: 8,000; Referee: Igor Yegorov

24 June 2007 14	Krylia Sovetov	1 – 0	CSKA Moscow	Samara
14:00 MSK (UTC+4)	Mujiri 29'	Report	Rahimić (yellow card) 63'; Aldonin (yellow card) 67'	Stadium: Metallurg Stadium; Attendance: 26,000; Referee: Sergey Timofeev

1 July 2007 15	CSKA Moscow	0 – 0	Kuban Krasnodar	Moscow
16:00 MSK (UTC+4)	Gorelov (yellow card) 90'	Report	Kaleshin (yellow card) 90'	Stadium: Luzhniki Stadium; Attendance: 8,500; Referee: Aleksandr Gvardis

14 July 2007 16	CSKA Moscow	0 – 1	Dynamo Moscow	Moscow
14:00 MSK (UTC+4)	Aldonin (yellow card) 43'	Report	Granat (yellow card) 28'; Pimenov 43'; Kolodin (yellow card) 84'; Semshov (yellow card) 90'	Stadium: Luzhniki Stadium; Attendance: 15,000; Referee: Aleksandr Kolobaev

22 July 2007 17	Lokomotiv Moscow	1 – 2	CSKA Moscow	Moscow
18:00 MSK (UTC+4)	Rodolfo (yellow card) 45'; Traoré (yellow card) 45'; Ivanović 59'; Draman (yellow card) 85'	Report	V.Berezutski (yellow card) 42'; Vágner Love 44', 48'; A.Berezutski (yellow card) 45'; Ignashevich (yellow card) 68'; Mandrykin (yellow card) 90'	Stadium: Lokomotiv Stadium; Attendance: 23,323; Referee: Aleksei Nikolaev

29 July 2007 18	CSKA Moscow	0 – 0	Khimki	Moscow
18:00 MSK (UTC+4)		Report	Vorobyov (yellow card) 69'	Stadium: Luzhniki Stadium; Attendance: 9,500; Referee: Aleksandr Gvardis

5 August 2007 19	Spartak Nalchik	1 – 1	CSKA Moscow	Nalchik
20:00 MSK (UTC+4)	Džudović (yellow card) 45'; Mashukov (yellow card) 56'; Fayzulin 65'	Report	Jô 6'; Zhirkov (yellow card) 10'; A.Berezutski (yellow card) 12'; V.Berezutski (yellow card) 45'; Aldonin (yellow card) 70'; Rahimić (yellow card) 81'	Stadium: Spartak Stadium; Attendance: 13,800; Referee: Stanislav Sukhina

12 August 2007 20	CSKA Moscow	2 – 0	Moscow	Moscow
14:00 MSK (UTC+4)	Mamayev (yellow card) 43'; Ignashevich 52'; Rahimić (yellow card) 55'; Šemberas (yellow card) 58'; Vágner Love 87'	Report	Barrientos (yellow card) 56'; Adamov (yellow card) 58'; Bystrov (yellow card) 65'	Stadium: Luzhniki Stadium; Attendance: 12,000; Referee: Aleksandr Kolobaev

18 August 2007 21	Saturn	2 – 2	CSKA Moscow	Ramenskoye
14:00 MSK (UTC+4)	Karyaka 25', 41'; Kinský (yellow card) 30'; Shilla (yellow card) 83'	Report	Vágner Love 31' (pen.), 43'; Jô (yellow card) 89'	Stadium: Saturn Stadium; Attendance: 15,200; Referee: Aleksandr Gvardis

26 August 2007 22	CSKA Moscow	4 – 0	Rostov	Moscow
15:30 MSK (UTC+4)	Jô 4', 64'; Šemberas (yellow card) 7'; Vágner Love 78'; Krasić 83'	Report	Trusevych (yellow card) 3'; Horák (yellow card) 6'; Vještica (yellow card) 59'	Stadium: Luzhniki Stadium; Attendance: 8,500; Referee: Vitali Doroshenko

2 September 2007 23	Spartak Moscow	1 – 1	CSKA Moscow	Moscow
14:00 MSK (UTC+4)	Mozart 30' (pen.) (yellow card) 81'; Bystrov (yellow card) 83'	Report	Ignashevich (yellow card) 27'; Ratinho (yellow card) 84'; Janczyk 90+4'	Stadium: Lokomotiv Stadium; Attendance: 68,000; Referee: Alberto Mallenco

23 September 2007 24	CSKA Moscow	1 – 0	Amkar Perm	Moscow
17:00 MSK (UTC+4)	Dudu (yellow card) 17'; Šemberas (yellow card) 18'; Jô 60'	Report	Dujmović (yellow card) 29'; Gaál (yellow card) 63'; Volkov (yellow card) 75'; Belorukov (yellow card) 86'	Stadium: Luzhniki Stadium; Attendance: 9,500; Referee: Alexei Kovalev

29 September 2007 25	Zenit St. Petersburg	2 – 1	CSKA Moscow	Saint Petersburg
14:00 MSK (UTC+4)	Lombaerts (yellow card) 19'; Pogrebnyak 32' (yellow card) 90'; Denisov 89'	Report	Šemberas (yellow card) 38'; Ignashevich (yellow card) 63'; Gusev (yellow card) 78'; Vágner Love 90+1'	Stadium: Petrovsky Stadium; Attendance: 21,300; Referee: Claus Bo Larsen

7 October 2007 26	CSKA Moscow	4 – 0	Luch-Energiya	Moscow
16:00 MSK (UTC+4)	Jô 19', 65'; Vágner Love 58' (pen.); Dudu 90'	Report	Kralevski (yellow card) 57'	Stadium: Luzhniki Stadium; Attendance: 3,500; Referee: Stanislav Sukhina

20 October 2007 27	Tom Tomsk	0 – 1	CSKA Moscow	Tomsk
16:00 MSK (UTC+4)	Yevsikov (yellow card) 41'; Mladenov (yellow card) 71'	Report	Maznov 45+1' (o.g.); Carvalho (yellow card) 77'; Mandrykin (yellow card) 90'	Stadium: Trud Stadium; Attendance: 15,000

28 October 2007 28	CSKA Moscow	4 – 2	Krylia Sovetov	Moscow
16:00 MSK (UTC+3)	Ratinho 6' (yellow card) 90'; Jô 29', 39' (pen.); Zhirkov 57'	Report	Branco (yellow card) 40'; Mujiri 51'; Łągiewka 67'; Medvedev (yellow card) 87'; Bobyor (yellow card) 87'	Stadium: Luzhniki Stadium; Attendance: 8,200; Referee: Aleksandr Gvardis

3 November 2007 29	Kuban Krasnodar	0 – 1	CSKA Moscow	Krasnodar
14:00 MSK (UTC+3)	Jefthon (yellow card) 44'; Berberović (yellow card) 75'; Kaleshin (yellow card) 86'	Report	Rahimić (yellow card) 41'; A.Berezutski (yellow card) 42'; Aldonin 80'	Stadium: Kuban Stadium; Attendance: 27,000; Referee: Stanislav Sukhina

11 November 2007 30	Rubin Kazan	0 – 1	CSKA Moscow	Kazan
MSK (UTC+4)	Paunović (yellow card) 88'; Gabriel (yellow card) 90'	Report	Ignashevich 78'; Vágner Love (yellow card) 88'	Stadium: Central Stadium; Attendance: 10,000; Referee: Aleksandr Gonchar

==== League table ====
Pos	Team	Pld	W	D	L	GF	GA	GD	Pts	Qualification or relegation
1	Zenit St. Petersburg (C)	30	18	7	5	54	32	+22	61	Qualification to Champions League group stage
2	Spartak Moscow	30	17	8	5	50	30	+20	59	Qualification to Champions League third qualifying round
3	CSKA Moscow	30	14	11	5	43	24	+19	53	Qualification to UEFA Cup first round (Note: Qualified as the winner of 2007–08 Russian Cup)
4	FC Moscow	30	15	7	8	40	32	+8	52	Qualification to UEFA Cup second qualifying round
5	Saturn	30	11	12	7	34	28	+6	45	Qualification to Intertoto Cup second round

Source: RFPL
Rules for classification: 1st points; 2nd matches won; 3rd goal difference; 4th head-to-head (points, matches won, goal difference, goals scored, away goals scored); 5th goals scored; 6th away goals scored; 7th drawing of lots
(C) Champions

=== Russian Cup ===
==== 2006–2007 ====
18 February 2007 Sixth round 1st leg	CSKA Moscow	0 – 0	Krylia Sovetov	Vladikavkaz
14:00 MSK (UTC+3)	Šemberas (yellow card) 35'; Aldonin (yellow card) 42'; Grigoryev (yellow card) 68'; Krasić (yellow card) 76'; Ramón (yellow card) 82'	Report	Topić (yellow card) 11'; Medvedev (yellow card) 41'; Booth (yellow card) 53'; Branco (yellow card) 57'; Skvernyuk (yellow card) 78'	Stadium: Republican Spartak Stadium; Attendance: 5,000; Referee: Aleksandr Yevstigneyev

26 February 2007 Sixth round 2nd leg	Krylia Sovetov	2 – 0	CSKA Moscow	Moscow
14:00 MSK (UTC+3)	Booth (yellow card) 12'; Topić 17'; Skvernyuk (yellow card) 74'; Bobyor 83'	Report	Aldonin (yellow card) 53'; Zhirkov (yellow card) 59'; Dudu (yellow card) 62'; A.Berezutski (yellow card) 90'	Stadium: Luzhniki Stadium; Attendance: 1,350; Referee: Stanislav Sukhina

==== 2007–2008 ====
27 June 2007 Round of 32	Baltika Kaliningrad	0 – 1	CSKA Moscow	Kaliningrad
20:00 MSK (UTC+4)	Zernov (yellow card) 57'; Timofeyev (yellow card) 59'	Report	Taranov 23'; Šemberas (yellow card) 70'	Stadium: Baltika Stadium; Attendance: 14,660; Referee: Aleksei Kovalyov

8 August 2007 Round of 16	CSKA Moscow	2 – 0	FC Khimki	Moscow
19:00 MSK (UTC+4)	Janczyk 24'; Grigoryev (yellow card) 67'; Zhirkov 88'	Report	Samusiovas (yellow card) 31'; Arkhipov (yellow card) 44'	Stadium: Dynamo Stadium; Attendance: 6,100; Referee: Vitali Doroshenko

31 October 2007 Quarterfinals	CSKA Moscow	2 – 1	Spartak Nalchik	Moscow
18:00 MSK (UTC+3)	Jô 55'; Grigoryev (yellow card) 58'; Carvalho 73'	Report	Kazharov 4'; Džudović (yellow card) 17' (yellow-red card) 76'	Stadium: Luzhniki Stadium; Attendance: 5,000; Referee: Aleksei Kovalyov

Round 16 took place during the 2008 season.

=== UEFA Champions League ===
==== Group stage ====
Pos	Team	Pld	W	D	L	GF	GA	GD	Pts	Qualification
1	(Italy) Internazionale	6	5	0	1	12	4	+8	15	Advance to knockout stage
2	(Turkey) Fenerbahçe	6	3	2	1	8	6	+2	11	Advance to knockout stage
3	(Netherlands) PSV Eindhoven	6	2	1	3	3	6	−3	7	Transfer to UEFA Cup
4	(Russia) CSKA Moscow	6	0	1	5	7	14	−7	1	

Source: RSSSF

19 September 2007 1	PSV Eindhoven (Netherlands)	2 – 1	(Russia) CSKA Moscow	Eindhoven, Netherlands
22:45 MSK (UTC+4)	Lazović 60'; Perez 80'	Report	Rahimić (yellow card) 73'; Dudu (yellow card) 82'; Vágner Love 89'	Stadium: Philips Stadion; Attendance: 30,000; Referee: Pedro Proença (Portugal)

2 October 2007 2	CSKA Moscow (Russia)	2 – 2	(Turkey) Fenerbahçe	Moscow, Russia
20:30 MSK (UTC+4)	Krasić 49' (yellow card) 66'; Vágner Love 53' (pen.); Zhirkov (yellow card) 78'	Report	Alex 9'; Edu (yellow card) 52'; Lugano (yellow card) 65'; Deivid 86'	Stadium: Lokomotiv Stadium; Attendance: 25,000; Referee: Knut Kircher (Germany)

23 October 2007 3	CSKA Moscow (Russia)	1 – 2	(Italy) Internazionale	Moscow, Russia
20:30 MSK (UTC+4)	Jô 32'; Carvalho (yellow card) 61'	Report	Figo (yellow card) 43'; Crespo 52'; Samuel 80'; Solari (yellow card) 83'	Stadium: Lokomotiv Stadium; Attendance: 24,000; Referee: Mike Riley (England)

7 November 2007 4	Internazionale (Italy)	4 – 2	(Russia) CSKA Moscow	Milan, Italy
22:45 MSK (UTC+3)	Ibrahimović 32', 75'; Cambiasso 34', 67'; Dacourt (yellow card) 84'	Report	Jô 22'; Vágner Love 31'; Rahimić (yellow card) 39'; Dudu (yellow card) 45'; V.Berezutski (yellow card) 65'; Zhirkov (yellow card) 72'	Stadium: San Siro; Attendance: 22,384; Referee: Paul Allaerts (Belgium)

27 November 2007 5	CSKA Moscow (Russia)	0 – 1	(Netherlands) PSV Eindhoven	Moscow, Russia
20:30 MSK (UTC+3)	A.Berezutski (yellow card) 13'; Dudu (yellow card) 57'; Rahimić (yellow card) 64'	Report	Méndez (yellow card) 30'; Farfán 39'; Marcellis (yellow card) 57'	Stadium: Lokomotiv Stadium; Attendance: 14,000; Referee: Manuel Mejuto González (Spain)

12 December 2007 6	Fenerbahçe (Turkey)	3 – 1	(Russia) CSKA Moscow	Istanbul, Turkey
22:45 MSK (UTC+3)	Alex 32'; Gönül (yellow card) 40'; Uğur Boral 45+1', 90'	Report	Edu 30' (o.g.); Erkin (yellow card) 38'; Šemberas (yellow card) 42'; Zhirkov (yellow card) 90'	Stadium: Şükrü Saracoğlu Stadium; Attendance: 45,745; Referee: Matteo Trefoloni (Italy)

== Statistics ==
As of match played 12 December 2007

=== Appearances and goals ===
No.	Pos	Nat	Player	Total		Premier League		2006-07 Russian Cup		2007-08 Russian Cup		Super Cup		UEFA Cup		Champions League	
No.	Pos	Nat	Player	Apps	Goals	Apps	Goals	Apps	Goals	Apps	Goals	Apps	Goals	Apps	Goals	Apps	Goals
1	GK	(Russia) RUS	Veniamin Mandrykin	27	0	19+1	0	0+1	0	3	0	0	0	0	0	3	0
2	DF	(Lithuania) LTU	Deividas Šemberas	35	0	24	0	1+1	0	2	0	0+1	0	1+1	0	4	0
4	DF	(Russia) RUS	Sergei Ignashevich	39	3	25+1	3	2	0	3	0	1	0	2	0	5	0
5	MF	(Brazil) BRA	Ramón	25	1	13+5	1	1+1	0	0	0	0+1	0	1+1	0	2	0
6	DF	(Russia) RUS	Aleksei Berezutski	38	0	26	0	1	0	2	0	1	0	2	0	6	0
7	MF	(Brazil) BRA	Daniel Carvalho	11	1	3+1	0	1+1	0	1	1	0	0	1+1	0	2	0
8	MF	(Russia) RUS	Rolan Gusev	18	0	5+11	0	0	0	2	0	0	0	0	0	0	0
9	FW	(Brazil) BRA	Vágner Love	28	17	23	13	0	0	0+1	0	1	1	0	0	3	3
10	FW	(Brazil) BRA	Jô	38	18	26+1	13	2	0	2	1	1	2	2	0	4	2
11	MF	(Russia) RUS	Pavel Mamayev	5	0	2+2	0	0	0	0	0	0	0	0	0	0+1	0
15	DF	(Nigeria) NGA	Chidi Odiah	6	0	1+3	0	0	0	0	0	0	0	0	0	0+2	0
17	MF	(Serbia) SRB	Miloš Krasić	32	5	22	4	1+1	0	1	0	1	0	1+1	0	4	1
18	MF	(Russia) RUS	Yuri Zhirkov	43	3	29	2	2	0	2+1	1	1	0	2	0	6	0
19	FW	(Poland) POL	Dawid Janczyk	15	2	1+9	1	0	0	1+1	1	0	0	0	0	2+1	0
20	MF	(Brazil) BRA	Dudu	25	1	11+4	1	2	0	0	0	1	0	2	0	5	0
21	DF	(Brazil) BRA	Ratinho	11	1	2+4	1	0	0	1	0	0	0	0	0	1+3	0
22	MF	(Russia) RUS	Evgeni Aldonin	39	2	22+5	2	2	0	2	0	1	0	2	0	3+2	0
24	DF	(Russia) RUS	Vasili Berezutski	38	1	25+1	1	2	0	2	0	1	0	2	0	5	0
25	MF	(Bosnia and Herzegovina) BIH	Elvir Rahimić	40	0	26+1	0	2	0	3	0	1	0	2	0	5	0
33	GK	(Russia) RUS	Yevgeny Pomazan	1	0	1	0	0	0	0	0	0	0	0	0	0	0
35	GK	(Russia) RUS	Igor Akinfeev	18	0	10	0	2	0	0	0	1	0	2	0	3	0
39	DF	(Russia) RUS	Ivan Taranov	18	1	2+10	0	0	0	1+2	1	0+1	0	0	0	0+2	0
42	FW	(Russia) RUS	Dmitry Tikhonov	3	0	2	0	0	0	1	0	0	0	0	0	0	0
44	FW	(Russia) RUS	Nikita Burmistrov	6	0	1+4	0	0	0	1	0	0	0	0	0	0	0
50	DF	(Russia) RUS	Anton Grigoryev	18	0	7+3	0	1	0	2+1	0	0	0	0	0	2+2	0
57	DF	(Russia) RUS	Sergei Gorelov	3	0	0+2	0	0	0	0+1	0	0	0	0	0	0	0
88	MF	(Turkey) TUR	Caner Erkin	14	0	2+6	0	0+1	0	1+2	0	0	0	0	0	1+1	0
Players that left CSKA Moscow on loan during the season:
Players who appeared for CSKA Moscow that left during the season:

=== Goal scorers ===
Place	Position	Nation	Number	Name	Premier League	2006-07 Russian Cup	2007-08 Russian Cup	Super Cup	UEFA Cup	Champions League	Total
1	FW	(Brazil)	10	Jô	13	0	1	2	0	2	18
2	FW	(Brazil)	9	Vágner Love	13	0	0	1	0	3	18
3	DF	(Russia)	4	Sergei Ignashevich	3	0	0	1	0	0	4
3	MF	(Serbia)	17	Miloš Krasić	3	0	0	0	0	1	4
5	MF	(Russia)	18	Yuri Zhirkov	2	0	1	0	0	0	3
5				Own goal	2	0	0	0	0	1	3
7	MF	(Russia)	22	Evgeni Aldonin	2	0	0	0	0	0	2
7	FW	(Poland)	19	Dawid Janczyk	1	0	1	0	0	0	2
9	DF	(Russia)	24	Vasili Berezutski	1	0	0	0	0	0	1
9	DF	(Brazil)	21	Ratinho	1	0	0	0	0	0	1
9	MF	(Brazil)	5	Ramón	1	0	0	0	0	0	1
9	MF	(Brazil)	20	Dudu	1	0	0	0	0	0	1
9	DF	(Poland)	39	Ivan Taranov	0	0	1	0	0	0	1
9	MF	(Brazil)	7	Daniel Carvalho	0	0	1	0	0	0	1
				TOTALS	43	0	5	4	0	7	59

=== Disciplinary record ===
Number	Nation	Position	Name	Premier League		2006-07 Russian Cup		2007-08 Russian Cup		Super Cup		UEFA Cup		Champions League		Total	
Number	Nation	Position	Name	Booked	Sent off (straight red)	Booked	Sent off (straight red)	Booked	Sent off (straight red)	Booked	Sent off (straight red)	Booked	Sent off (straight red)	Booked	Sent off (straight red)	Booked	Sent off (straight red)
1	(Russia)	GK	Veniamin Mandrykin	2	0	0	0	0	0	0	0	0	0	0	0	2	0
2	(Lithuania)	DF	Deividas Šemberas	8	0	1	0	1	0	0	0	2	0	1	0	13	0
4	(Russia)	DF	Sergei Ignashevich	4	0	0	0	0	0	1	0	0	0	0	0	5	0
5	(Brazil)	MF	Ramón	1	0	1	0	0	0	0	0	0	0	0	0	2	0
6	(Russia)	DF	Aleksei Berezutski	5	0	1	0	0	0	0	0	0	0	1	0	7	0
7	(Brazil)	MF	Daniel Carvalho	1	0	0	0	0	0	0	0	1	0	1	0	3	0
8	(Russia)	MF	Rolan Gusev	3	0	0	0	0	0	0	0	0	0	0	0	3	0
9	(Brazil)	FW	Vágner Love	3	0	0	0	0	0	0	0	0	0	0	0	3	0
10	(Brazil)	FW	Jô	3	0	0	0	0	0	1	0	0	0	0	0	4	0
11	(Russia)	MF	Pavel Mamayev	1	0	0	0	0	0	0	0	0	0	0	0	1	0
17	(Serbia)	MF	Miloš Krasić	1	0	1	0	0	0	0	0	0	0	1	0	3	0
18	(Russia)	MF	Yuri Zhirkov	5	0	1	0	0	0	0	0	0	0	3	0	9	0
20	(Brazil)	MF	Dudu	2	0	1	0	0	0	0	0	0	0	3	0	6	0
21	(Brazil)	DF	Ratinho	2	0	0	0	0	0	0	0	0	0	0	0	2	0
22	(Russia)	MF	Evgeni Aldonin	6	0	2	0	0	0	0	0	1	0	0	0	9	0
24	(Russia)	DF	Vasili Berezutski	3	1	0	0	0	0	0	0	0	0	1	0	4	1
25	(Bosnia and Herzegovina)	MF	Elvir Rahimić	9	0	0	0	0	0	0	0	1	0	3	0	13	0
50	(Russia)	DF	Anton Grigoryev	1	0	1	0	2	0	0	0	0	0	0	0	4	0
57	(Russia)	DF	Sergei Gorelov	1	0	0	0	0	0	0	0	0	0	0	0	1	0
88	(Turkey)	MF	Caner Erkin	0	0	0	0	0	0	0	0	0	0	1	0	1	0
			TOTALS	61	1	9	0	3	0	2	0	5	0	15	0	95	1
