= 2005 Russian Cup final =

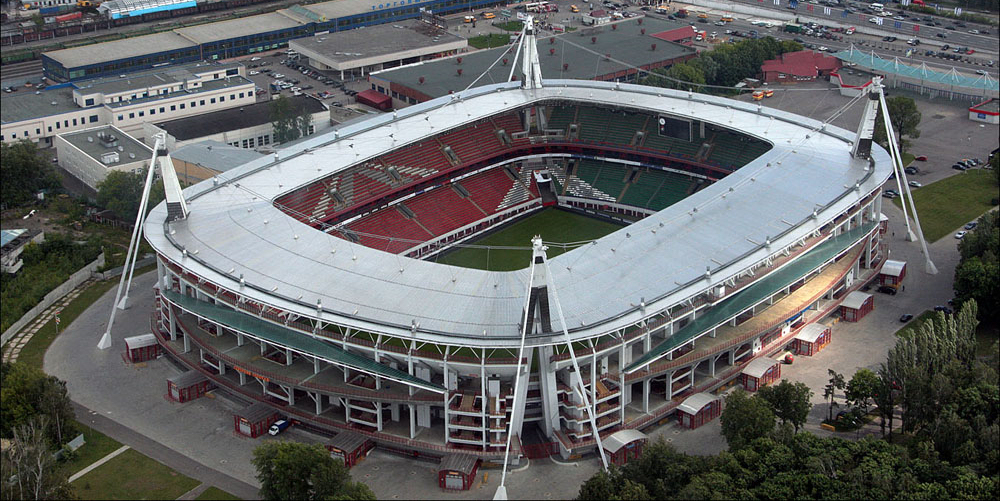
- Event: 2004–05 Russian Cup
CSKA Moscow	Khimki
1	0
- Date: 29 May 2005
- Venue: Lokomotiv Stadium, Moscow
- Referee: Almir Kayumov
- Attendance: 24,000

The 2005 Russian Cup final decided the winner of the 2004–05 Russian Cup, the 13th season of Russia's main football cup. It was played on 29 May 2005 at the Lokomotiv Stadium in Moscow, between CSKA Moscow and Khimki. CSKA Moscow emerged victorious with a 1–0 win thanks to a 68th-minute header from Yuri Zhirkov.

== Match ==
=== Details ===
29 May 2005
16:00 UTC+3

CSKA Moscow	1–0	Khimki
Zhirkov 68'	Report

Lokomotiv Stadium, Moscow
Attendance: 24,000
Referee: Almir Kayumov (Moscow)

CSKA Moscow	Khimki

GK	35	(Russia) Igor Akinfeev
RB	24	(Russia) Vasili Berezutski		(substituted off) 46'
CB	4	(Russia) Sergei Ignashevich (c)
CB	6	(Russia) Aleksei Berezutski
LB	2	(Lithuania) Deividas Šemberas	(yellow card) 26'
RM	7	(Brazil) Daniel Carvalho
CM	8	(Russia) Rolan Gusev		(substituted off) 55'
CM	22	(Russia) Evgeni Aldonin
LM	18	(Russia) Yuri Zhirkov
CF	11	(Brazil) Vágner Love		(substituted off) 71'
CF	9	(Croatia) Ivica Olić
Substitutes:
GK	1	(Russia) Veniamin Mandrykin
DF	15	(Nigeria) Chidi Odiah		(substituted on) 55'
DF	28	(Ukraine) Bohdan Shershun
MF	10	(Argentina) Osmar Ferreyra
FW	17	(Serbia and Montenegro) Miloš Krasić		(substituted on) 46'
FW	19	(Latvia) Juris Laizāns		(substituted on) 71'
FW	55	(Russia) Sergei Pravosud
Manager:
(Russia) Valery Gazzaev

GK	21	(Georgia (country)) Giorgi Lomaia
DF	3	(Ukraine) Andriy Proshyn
DF	5	(Moldova) Iurie Priganiuc	(yellow card) 87'
DF	18	(Serbia and Montenegro) Miodrag Jovanović (c)
MF	6	(Russia) Andrei Perov	(yellow card) 62'
MF	8	(Russia) Vitali Grishin
MF	11	(Russia) Andrey Tikhonov
MF	13	(Russia) Andrey Yeshchenko
MF	19	(Belarus) Timofei Kalachev
MF	26	(Russia) Ruslan Nakhushev		(substituted off) 82'
FW	23	(Russia) Aleksandr Danishevsky		(substituted off) 82'
Substitutes:
GK	1	(Russia) Anatoli Rozhkov
DF	61	(Russia) Oleg Malukov
MF	9	(Russia) Oleg Ivanov		(substituted on) 82'
MF	17	(Russia) Andrei Govorov
FW	28	(Russia) Paul Smurov
FW	20	(Russia) Andrei Ospeshinskiy
FW	27	(Russia) Alexander Antipenko		(substituted on) 82'
Manager:
(Ukraine) Pavlo Yakovenko

Assistant referees:
Viktor Kulagin
Alexander Averyanov
Fourth official:
Aleksandr Kolobaev
Additional assistant referees:
Andrew Budogossky

Match rules

- 90 minutes.
- 30 minutes of extra time if necessary.
- Penalty shoot-out if scores still level.
- Seven named substitutes, of which up to three may be used.
