= Daniel Carvalho =

Brazilian footballer and manager (born 1983)

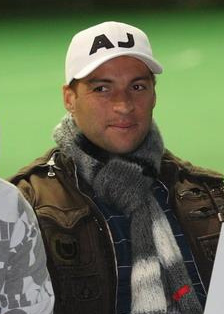

Personal information
- Full name: Daniel da Silva Carvalho
- Date of birth: 1 March 1983 (age 43)
- Place of birth: Pelotas, Brazil
- Height: 1.80 m (5 ft 11 in)
- Positions: Attacking midfielder; winger

Youth career
- 2000–2001: Internacional

Senior career*
Years	Team	Apps	(Gls)
2001–2003	Internacional	66	(7)
2003–2010	CSKA Moscow	85	(9)
2008	→ Internacional (loan)	12	(0)
2010	→ Al-Arabi (loan)	10	(3)
2010–2012	Atlético Mineiro	41	(6)
2012	→ Palmeiras (loan)	32	(3)
2013	Criciúma	15	(1)
2015	Botafogo	30	(2)
2016	Goiás	21	(1)
2017	Pelotas	7	(0)
2017	Oeste	2	(0)
2018	Pelotas		

International career
2003	Brazil U20	-	(6)
2004	Brazil U23	8	(0)
2006	Brazil	3	(1)
Medal record
Representing Brazil
FIFA U-20 World Cup
Winner	2003 UAE
- * Club domestic league appearances and goals

Daniel da Silva Carvalho (born 1 March 1983), more commonly known as Daniel Carvalho, is a Brazilian former football attacking midfielder.

== Club career ==
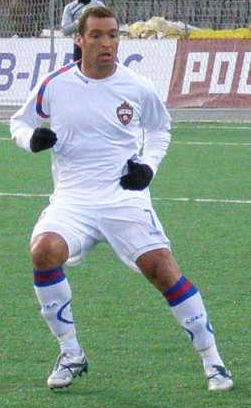

Carvalho started his career in his native state of Rio Grande do Sul at Sport Club Internacional before transferring to CSKA Moscow in early 2004, which at the time was coached by Artur Jorge, and where he would link up with fellow Brazilian compatriots Vágner Love, Dudu Cearense, and Jô, all of whom joined the team within his first two seasons at the club. Carvalho scored the winning goal on his debut in the 2004 Russian Super Cup game, a 3–1 extra time victory against Spartak Moscow. In 2005, he became the first foreign player to be named Russian Footballer of the Year by Futbol and Sport-Express. Carvalho's brilliant play during the 2005 UEFA Cup was the key to success of his team, who won the competition, defeating Sporting Lisbon in the Final. This made CSKA the first Russian club to ever win a UEFA competition. He was Man of the Match in the final as he was involved in all three of CSKA's goals. He scored in the 3–1 UEFA Super Cup lost to then European Champions Liverpool, but despite this defeat, Carvalho had shown he could cope on the European stage. In November 2007, Carvalho signed a new contract with CSKA until summer 2010, according to CSKA president Yevgeni Giner (or until December 2009, according to CSKA Press Office), with the option of further prolongation and the minimum fee release clause. However, he went on a six-month loan back to SC Internacional in July 2008. Since then he has returned to CSKA and hopes to recapture the form which propelled the Russian club to UEFA Cup honours in 2005. On 4 January 2010, Qatari club Al-Arabi Sports Club have signed the Brazilian attacking midfielder from PFC CSKA Moscow.

In May 2010, he was signed by Atlético Mineiro, and once again returned to Brazil.

In March 2013, Carvalho signed for Criciúma. Carvalho's Criciúma contract was cancelled in October 2013.

Carvalho went on to retire from professional football, and join Brazilian futsal side DC Futsal.

On 22 April 2015, Carvalho signed for Brazilian side Botafogo.

== International career ==
Carvalho was called up for a friendly between Brazil and Norway on 16 August 2006 for the first time. He started the match and scored on his debut, and took part in the following 3–0 defeat of Argentina on 3 September. He also scored in the 4–0 win in an unofficial friendly match against Kuwaiti club Al Kuwait on 7 October 2006.

== Career statistics ==
=== Club ===
As of 8 December 2009

Appearances and goals by club, season and competition
Club	Season	League			National Cup		Continental		Other		Total	
Club	Season	Division	Apps	Goals	Apps	Goals	Apps	Goals	Apps	Goals	Apps	Goals
CSKA Moscow	2004	Russian Premier League	13	1	3	0	1	0	1	1	18	2
CSKA Moscow	2005	Russian Premier League	29	4	6	3	14	7	1	1	50	15
CSKA Moscow	2006	Russian Premier League	22	4	4	2	8	2	1	0	35	8
CSKA Moscow	2007	Russian Premier League	4	0	3	1	0	4	0	0	11	1
CSKA Moscow	2008	Russian Premier League	4	0	1	0	0	0	-		5	0
CSKA Moscow	2009	Russian Premier League	13	0	3	0	4	0	-		20	0
CSKA Moscow	Total		85	9	20	6	27	13	3	2	139	26
Career total			85	9	20	6	27	13	3	2	139	26

=== International ===
As of 1 April 2009

National team	Season	Apps	Goals
Brazil	2006	3	1
Total		3	1

International appearances and goals
#	Date	Venue	Opponent	Result	Goal	Competition
2004
	7 January 2004	Concepción, Chile	Venezuela	4–0	0	2004 Olympic Games qualification (Brazil U-23)
	9 January 2004	Concepción, Chile	Paraguay	3–0	0	2004 Olympic Games qualification (Brazil U-23)
	11 January 2004	Concepción, Chile	Uruguay	1–1	0	2004 Olympic Games qualification (Brazil U-23)
	15 January 2004	Concepción, Chile	Chile	1–1	0	2004 Olympic Games qualification (Brazil U-23)
	18 January 2004	Valparaíso, Chile	Colombia	3–0	0	2004 Olympic Games qualification (Brazil U-23)
	21 January 2004	Valparaíso, Chile	Argentina	0–1	0	2004 Olympic Games qualification (Brazil U-23)
	23 January 2004	Viña del Mar, Chile	Chile	3–1	0	2004 Olympic Games qualification (Brazil U-23)
	25 January 2004	Viña del Mar, Chile	Paraguay	0–2	0	2004 Olympic Games qualification (Brazil U-23)
2006
1.	16 August 2006	Oslo, Norway	Norway	1–1	1	Friendly
2.	3 September 2006	London, England	Argentina	3–0	0	Friendly
	7 October 2006	Kuwait City, Kuwait	Al Kuwait Selection	4–0	1	Unofficial friendly
3.	10 October 2006	Stockholm, Sweden	Ecuador	2–1	0	Friendly

== Honours ==
Internacional

- Campeonato Gaúcho: 2002, 2003
- Copa Sudamericana: 2008

CSKA Moscow

- Russian Premier League: 2005, 2006
- Russian Cup: 2004–05, 2005–06, 2008–09
- Russian Super Cup: 2004, 2006, 2007, 2009
- UEFA Cup: 2004–05

Palmeiras

- Copa do Brasil: 2012

Botafogo

- Campeonato Brasileiro Série B: 2015

Goiás

- Campeonato Goiano: 2016

Brazil U20

- FIFA U-20 World Cup: 2003

Individual

- Footballer of the Year in Russia (Sport-Express): 2005
- Footballer of the Year in Russia (Futbol): 2005
- In the list of 33 best football players of the championship of Russia: 2005, 2006
- 2005 UEFA Cup Final: Man of the match
