= Miloš Krasić =

Serbian footballer (born 1984)

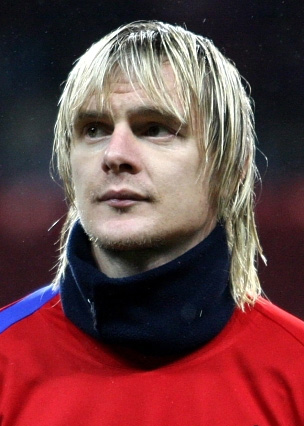
- Krasić in 2009

Personal information
- Date of birth: 1 November 1984 (age 42)
- Place of birth: Titova Mitrovica, SFR Yugoslavia
- Height: 1.85 m (6 ft 1 in)
- Position: Winger

Youth career
- Rudar Kosovska Mitrovica
- 1998–2001: Vojvodina

Senior career*
Years	Team	Apps	(Gls)
2001–2004	Vojvodina	77	(7)
2004–2010	CSKA Moscow	150	(26)
2010–2012	Juventus	40	(8)
2012–2015	Fenerbahçe	13	(0)
2013–2014	→ Bastia (loan)	18	(2)
2015–2018	Lechia Gdańsk	86	(7)
Total		384	(51)

International career
2006–2011	Serbia	46	(3)
Medal record
Men's football
Representing Serbia and Montenegro
UEFA European Under-21 Championship
Runner-up	2004 Germany
Representing Serbia
UEFA European Under-21 Championship
Runner-up	2007 Netherlands
- * Club domestic league appearances and goals

Miloš Krasić (Serbian Cyrillic: Милош Красић; born 1 November 1984) is a Serbian former professional footballer who played as a winger. He played for the Serbia national team at the 2010 FIFA World Cup, and at one point in his career, he was named by FourFourTwo as one of the 100 best players in the world.

== Early life ==
Krasić was born on 1 November 1984 in Titova Mitrovica, SR Serbia, SFR Yugoslavia, to Serbian parents Veljko and Zorica. After starting out with the hometown side FK Rudar, Krasić was noticed by FK Vojvodina in 1998 and he made a switch northwards at age 13. He spent the next four-and-a-half seasons in Novi Sad, where he further raised his level and became the team captain.

== Club career ==
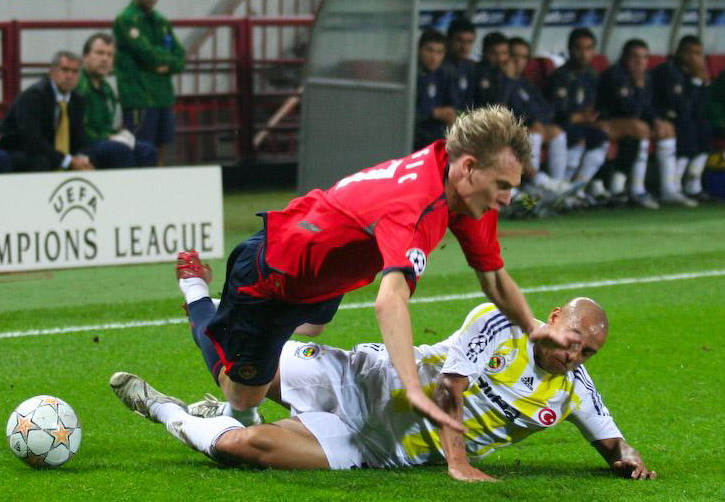
Krasić being fouled by Fenerbahçe's Roberto Carlos during his time at CSKA Moscow in 2007

=== CSKA Moscow ===
Vojvodina and CSKA Moscow were in negotiations over Krasić's transfer since January 2004, but the deal stalled. The player himself even made several unsuccessful trips to Moscow. During the summer of 2004, the deal was completed and the winger was on his way to Russia. He featured in three games during the club's 2004–05 UEFA Cup-winning run, including an appearance in the final as a substitute. He also helped them win the Russian Premier League in 2005 and 2006, the Russian Cup in 2005, 2006, 2008 and 2009, and the Russian Super Cup in 2006, 2007 and 2009.

=== Juventus ===
After much speculation in the summer of 2010, Juventus and CSKA agreed on a fee for Krasić reported to be in the range of about €15 million. Krasić officially became a Juventus player on 21 August and was given the number 27 shirt. Krasić was instrumental in his home debut against Sampdoria, assisting a goal and creating many chances. The game ended 3–3. In his second away game in the Serie A, against Udinese, Krasić proved once again instrumental in their 4–0 victory, assisting Fabio Quagliarella and Claudio Marchisio for a goal each. Krasić scored his first Juventus goals against Cagliari on 26 September 2010, netting a hat-trick.

He scored his first European goal for Juventus, helping his side salvage a point against Austrian side Red Bull Salzburg in the Group A tie of the 2010–11 UEFA Europa League, in a match that finished 1–1. On 26 October, he was given a two-match ban after diving, although winning a penalty (the penalty was then missed), during the league match against Bologna. Krasić scored a goal in a 2–0 away win over Genoa after Eduardo put a ball in his own net in the 18th minute. On 12 December, in the game against Lazio, Krasić scored a very late, match-winning goal in which his attempted cross deflected off Lazio goalkeeper Fernando Muslera and into the net. The match ended immediately after the goal in a 2–1 victory for Juventus. He scored a screamer which guided the Bianconeri to a 2–1 victory against Brescia. He managed to score another screamer against Roma in which the match ended 2–0.

In the 2011–12 season, under manager Antonio Conte, Krasić lost his place in the starting line-up and managed to make only 9 appearances, scoring once (against Catania on 25 September 2011). However, as the team finished first in the Serie A, he became an Italian highest league winner.

=== Fenerbahçe ===
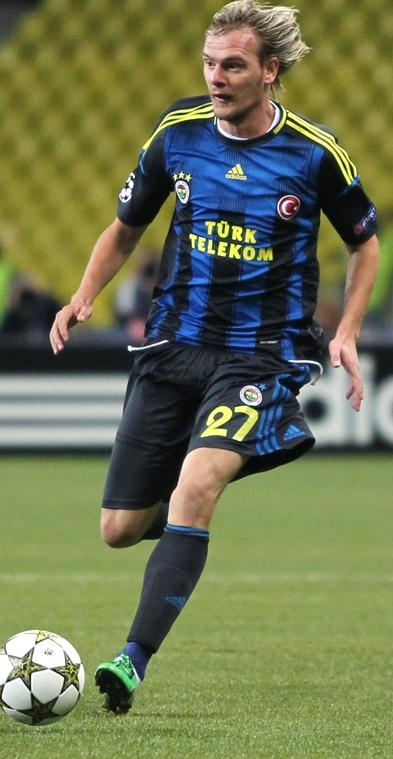
Krasić during a match with Fenerbahçe

Fenerbahçe completed the transfer of Krasić for €7 million on 3 August 2012. He signed a four-year contract worth €2.3 million per-season. His played first match for the club on 12 August 2012 against rivals Galatasaray, then scored his first goal for Fenerbahçe against Göztepe in a 4–0 Turkish Cup victory.

==== Loan to Bastia ====
On the last day of the 2013 summer transfer window, French side Bastia managed to acquire Krasić on a season-long loan deal for €826,000. He scored a skillful goal in a 2–0 win against Evian on 1 December 2013.

==== Back to Fenerbahçe ====
Before the 2014–15 season, Krasić returned to Fenerbahçe after his loan spell but struggled to secure a spot in the first-team squad. instead beginning to play for the club's reserve team. Before the 2015–2016 season, he was called up to train with the first team.

=== Lechia Gdańsk ===
On 30 August 2015, Krasić signed for Polish club Lechia Gdańsk. He made his debut during the second half of Lechia's Ekstraklasa match with Korona Kielce. He spent three seasons at the club.

== International career ==
Krasić was an important member of the Serbia and Montenegro under-21 squad in two UEFA European Under-21 Championships, as well as at the 2004 Summer Olympics. He was in the team that finished as runners-up in the 2004 European U-21 Championship in Germany, but did not play in any games. Two months later, he was part of the Serbia and Montenegro squad at the 2004 Summer Olympics.

In May 2006, Krasić played a leading role in the 2006 European U-21 Championship. He made his debut for the senior side later that year in a friendly against Denmark.

At senior level, Krasić was an important player for Serbia in 2010 FIFA World Cup qualification. He scored one goal in the match against Lithuania, another in the game against Austria and set up three in the game against Romania, which sealed his nation's qualification to the final tournament in South Africa.

In June 2010, he was selected in Serbia's squad for the 2010 FIFA World Cup, where he played on all three group stage matches. He earned a total of 46 caps, scoring 3 goals, and his final international was a November 2011 friendly match away against Honduras.

== Style of play ==
Krasić is a right-sided winger, noted for his powerful dribbling technique, energy on the pitch, and sprinting speed. During his time with Juventus, he earned comparisons with former Juventus great Pavel Nedvěd, due to their similar physical appearance, playing role, hard-working playing style, and Eastern European origins. He was named one of three examples of "traditional wingers" (the other two were Antonio Valencia and Ángel Di María) by UEFA's Champions magazine, who says such wingers take on the full-backs by the flanks to get as close to the goal-line as possible to cross the ball.

== Personal life ==
Krasić is from a footballing family: his older brother is Bojan Krasić and his cousin is Marko Krasić.

== Career statistics ==
=== Club ===
Appearances and goals by club, season and competition
Club	Season	League			National cup (Note: Includes Russian Cup, Coppa Italia, Turkish Cup, Polish Cup)		Europe		Other		Total	
Club	Season	Division	Apps	Goals	Apps	Goals	Apps	Goals	Apps	Goals	Apps	Goals
CSKA Moscow	2004	Russian Premier League	7	0	1	0	4 (Note: Appearances in UEFA Cup)	0	0	0	12	0
CSKA Moscow	2005	Russian Premier League	27	2	8	1	14	0	1 (Note: Appearance in UEFA Super Cup)	0	50	3
CSKA Moscow	2006	Russian Premier League	26	3	6	0	8 (Note: Appearances in UEFA Champions League)	0	1 (Note: Appearance in Russian Super Cup)	0	41	3
CSKA Moscow	2007	Russian Premier League	22	4	3	0	6 (Note: Four appearances and one goal in UEFA Champions League, two appearances in UEFA Cup)	1	1	0	32	5
CSKA Moscow	2008	Russian Premier League	28	6	2	1	6	0	0	0	36	7
CSKA Moscow	2009	Russian Premier League	26	9	3	0	10 (Note: Six appearances and four goals in UEFA Champions League, four appearances in UEFA Cup)	4	1	0	40	13
CSKA Moscow	2010	Russian Premier League	14	2	0	0	3	0	1	0	18	2
CSKA Moscow	Total		150	26	23	2	51	5	5	0	229	33
Juventus	2010–11	Serie A	33	7	2	1	6 (Note: Appearances in UEFA Europa League)	1	—		41	9
Juventus	2011–12	Serie A	7	1	2	0	—		—		9	1
Juventus	Total		40	8	4	1	6	1	—		50	10
Fenerbahçe	2012–13	Süper Lig	13	0	6	1	7 (Note: Two appearances in UEFA Champions League, five appearances in UEFA Europa League)	0	1 (Note: Appearance in Turkish Super Cup)	0	27	1
Fenerbahçe	2014–15	Süper Lig	0	0	0	0	0	0	0	0	0	0
Fenerbahçe	Total		13	0	6	1	7	0	1	0	27	1
Bastia (loan)	2013–14	Ligue 1	18	2	1	0	—		2 (Note: Appearances in Coupe de la Ligue)	0	21	2
Lechia Gdańsk	2015–16	Ekstraklasa	23	4	1	0	—		—		24	4
Lechia Gdańsk	2016–17	Ekstraklasa	34	2	1	0	—		—		35	2
Lechia Gdańsk	2017–18	Ekstraklasa	29	1	0	0	—		—		29	1
Lechia Gdańsk	Total		86	7	2	0	—		—		88	7
Career total			307	43	36	4	64	6	8	0	415	53

=== International ===
Appearances and goals by national team and year
National team	Year	Apps	Goals
Serbia	2006	1	0
Serbia	2007	9	0
Serbia	2008	6	2
Serbia	2009	12	0
Serbia	2010	11	1
Serbia	2011	7	0
Total		46	3

Scores and results list Serbia's goal tally first, score column indicates score after each Krasić goal.

List of international goals scored by Miloš Krasić
No.	Date	Venue	Opponent	Score	Result	Competition
1	11 October 2008	Stadion FK Crvena Zvezda, Belgrade, Serbia	Lithuania	2–0	3–0	2010 FIFA World Cup qualification
2	15 October 2008	Ernst-Happel-Stadion, Vienna, Austria	Austria	1–0	3–1	2010 FIFA World Cup qualification
3	5 June 2010	Stadion FK Partizan, Belgrade, Serbia	Cameroon	1–1	4–3	Friendly

== Honours ==
CSKA

- Russian Premier League: 2005, 2006
- Russian Cup: 2004–05, 2005–06, 2007–08, 2008–09
- Russian Super Cup: 2006, 2007, 2009
- UEFA Cup: 2004–05

Juventus

- Serie A: 2011–12

Fenerbahçe

- Turkish Cup: 2012–13

Individual

- Serbian Player of the Year: 2009
