= Govorov =

Govorov or Hovorov (Russian: Говоров, from говор meaning subdialect) is a Russian masculine surname, its feminine counterpart is Govorova or Hovorova. It may refer to

- Andrei Govorov (born 1984), Russian football player
- Andriy Hovorov (born 1992), Ukrainian swimmer
- Leonid Govorov (1897–1955), Soviet military commander
- Olena Hovorova (born 1973), Ukrainian triple jumper
