= Yuri Zhirkov =

Russian footballer (born 1983)

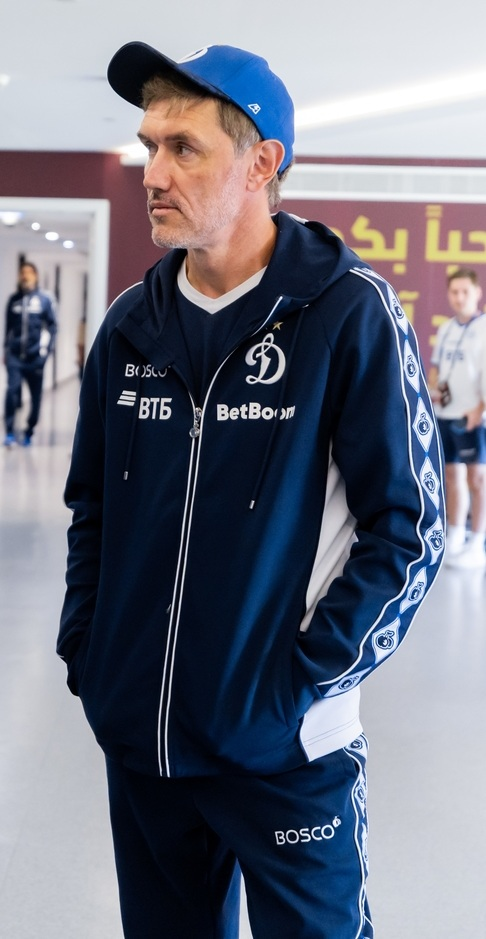
- Zhirkov as a coach of Dynamo Moscow in 2026

Personal information
- Full name: Yuri Valentinovich Zhirkov
- Date of birth: 20 August 1983 (age 43)
- Place of birth: Tambov, Russian SFSR, Soviet Union
- Height: 1.80 m (5 ft 11 in)
- Positions: Left-back; left winger

Youth career
- 1997–2001: Spartak Tambov

Senior career*
| Years | Team | Apps | (Gls) |
| 2001–2004 | Spartak Tambov | 74 | (26) |
| 2004–2009 | CSKA Moscow | 139 | (15) |
| 2009–2011 | Chelsea | 29 | (0) |
| 2011–2013 | Anzhi Makhachkala | 46 | (3) |
| 2013–2016 | Dynamo Moscow | 54 | (3) |
| 2016–2021 | Zenit Saint Petersburg | 95 | (4) |
| 2022 | Khimki | 3 | (0) |
| Total | | 440 | (51) |

International career
| 2004–2005 | Russia U-21 | 9 | (2) |
| 2005–2021 | Russia | 105 | (2) |

Managerial career
- 2026: Dynamo Moscow (assistant)
Medal record
Men's football
Representing Russia
UEFA European Championship
| Bronze medal – third place | 2008 |
- * Club domestic league appearances and goals

Yuri Valentinovich Zhirkov (Russian: Ю́рий Валенти́нович Жирко́в, IPA: [ˈjʉrʲɪj vəlʲɪnʲˈtʲinəvʲɪdʑ ʐɨrˈkof]; born 20 August 1983) is a Russian football coach and a former player who played as a left-back and as a left-winger.

A left-sided player who can play full-back or winger, Zhirkov began his career at local club Spartak Tambov before joining top-flight CSKA Moscow in 2004. Domestic and European success followed, and in 2009 he moved to English Premier League club Chelsea for £18 million. After two seasons, he returned to Russia with Anzhi Makhachkala, who sold him to Dynamo Moscow in 2013. He then signed for Zenit in January 2016.

Zhirkov has earned over 100 international caps since 2005. His performance at UEFA Euro 2008, in which Russia reached the semi-finals, was recognised with his inclusion in the Team of the Tournament and award as well as Futbol's Russian Footballer of the Year. He was also selected to the Russian squads for Euro 2012, the 2014 FIFA World Cup, the 2018 FIFA World Cup, where Russia hosted the tournament, and Euro 2020.

== Early life ==
Zhirkov was born in Tambov on 20 August 1983. His father, Valentin Ivanovich Zhirkov, worked at the Revtrud factory and his mother was a postwoman. Yuri was the second child in the family. The family lived in poverty, struggling to buy basic goods such as food and clothes. His first coach was Valery Sharapov, who signed him for the Tambov Regional Children and Youth Sports School.

== Club career ==
Zhirkov started his career at Spartak Tambov, where he scored 26 goals in 74 matches playing as a winger before leaving for CSKA Moscow

=== CSKA Moscow ===
Zhirkov joined CSKA Moscow in January 2004. His first official match was on 7 March 2004 in the Russian Super Cup against Spartak Moscow. CSKA's 3–1 victory gave him his first trophy. Zhirkov made his debut in the UEFA Champions League on 27 July against Neftchi Baku. He also appeared in the third qualifying round against Rangers.

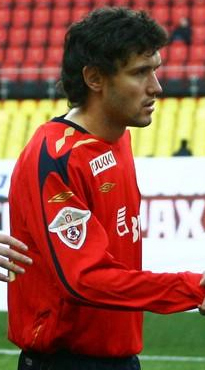
Zhirkov playing for CSKA Moscow

Zhirkov made his debut in the CIS Cup against Gomel and was replaced in the 70th minute. The final score was 2–2. In his second match, against Pakhtakor Tashkent, he played all 90 minutes, with the final score being 2–1. In the last qualifying match against Regar-TadAZ Tursunzoda, which also ended 2–1, Zhirkov played all 90 minutes.

Although Zhirkov missed the first match against Benfica, he participated in the return match. He also played in both matches against Partizan, and made a save in the second game. After defeating Auxerre and Parma, CSKA made its way to the final. On 18 May 2005, against Sporting CP at Sporting's own Estádio José Alvalade, Zhirkov scored a goal in the 65th minute to give CSKA a 2–1 lead. The score would end 3–1, making CSKA the first Russian club to win the UEFA Cup.

Zhirkov participated in all six matches of the group stage in the 2006–07 UEFA Champions League. On 6 December 2006, he scored a brilliant goal against Hamburger SV which would later be selected as the best goal of the competition by UEFA's official magazine. In the 2007–08 season, however, CSKA lost almost every game in Europe.

Zhirkov began his participation in the following season of European competition on 18 September 2008, against Croatian club Slaven Belupo. CSKA came from behind to win their first match 2–1. In the next match, CSKA defeated Deportivo de La Coruña 3–0. Zhirkov provided goal assists against Nancy, Feyenoord and scored in the game with Lech Poznań. It was his third goal in European competition.

In 2009, Zhirkov participated in three matches in European competitions, two against Aston Villa and one against Shakhtar Donetsk. In the second match, he scored his first goal in the 2009 tournament. In the third match, he was cautioned by the referee and therefore missed the next game.

=== Chelsea ===
On 6 July 2009, Zhirkov joined Chelsea on a four-year contract for a reported transfer fee of £18 million, exceeding the £15 million Arsenal paid for Andrey Arshavin in January 2009, thus making Zhirkov the most expensive Russian football player of all-time. Zhirkov scored on his debut in a friendly against Milan, the eventual match-winner. After regaining fitness from a knee injury, he made his competitive debut at left back against Queens Park Rangers in a League Cup tie on 23 September.

After battling a knee injury he made his Champions League debut for Chelsea on 25 November against Porto, playing as a left back and setting up Nicolas Anelka's goal in a 1–0 win. Zhirkov made his Premier League debut as a substitute for Joe Cole against West Ham United on 20 December 2009.

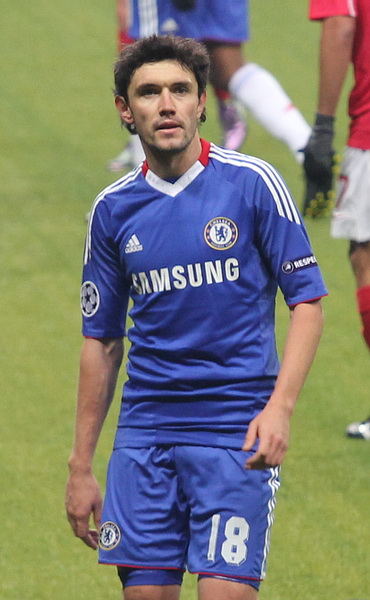
Zhirkov playing for Chelsea against Spartak Moscow in the UEFA Champions League on 19 October 2010

He made his first Premier League start in a 2–1 victory over Fulham on 28 December. Due to Ashley Cole's injury against Everton on 10 February, which ruled him out for three months, Zhirkov became first-choice left-back.

Zhirkov was one of Chelsea's best players in the Champions League round of 16 second leg against Internazionale, denying several scoring opportunities from Inter's forwards, but Chelsea were defeated 1–0 on the night and 3–1 on aggregate. In March 2010, he won two penalties for Chelsea against Aston Villa, both converted by Frank Lampard, as Chelsea won 7–1.

On 13 April 2010, Zhirkov put in a man of the match performance against Bolton Wanderers, despite suffering an injury which required four stitches in his head and had his head bandaged for the remainder of the first half, following a clash with the Bolton captain Kevin Davies. During his first season with Chelsea, the club won the Premier League and FA Cup double, making it the club's most successful season ever. His only goal for Chelsea came on 19 October 2010, a volley in a UEFA Champions League match against Spartak Moscow.

Zhirkov also started for the first team as a replacement for the injured Ramires against Wolverhampton Wanderers at Stamford Bridge and Blackburn Rovers at Ewood Park, providing two crucial assists. On 1 March, he came on as a substitute in the 71st minute, replacing Florent Malouda against title rivals Manchester United. Zhirkov won a penalty in the 78th minute, taken and scored by Frank Lampard, which proved to be the match-winner. He also hit the post, with the ball being deflected into the net by United centre-back Nemanja Vidić. The final score was 2–1 in favour of Chelsea at Stamford Bridge.

=== Anzhi ===
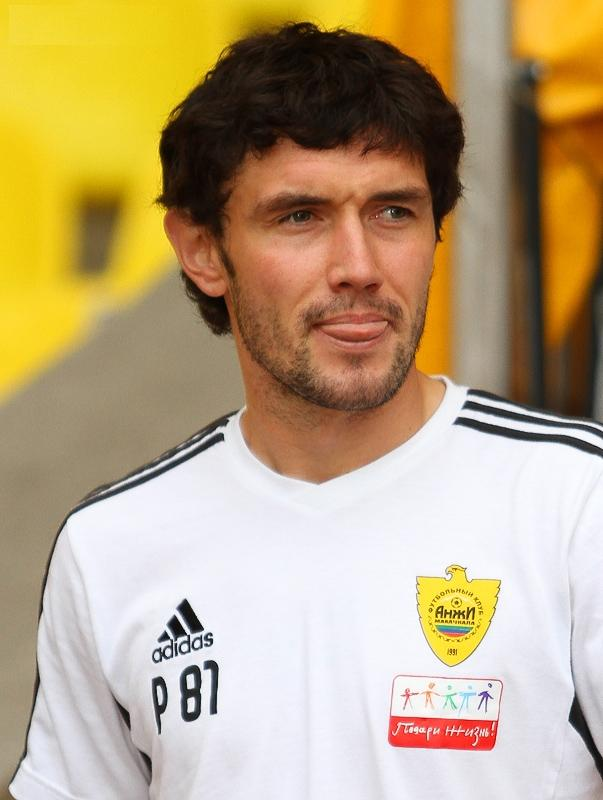
Zhirkov with Anzhi in 2011

On 14 August 2011, Chelsea announced the departure of Zhirkov to Russian Premier League side Anzhi Makhachkala for an undisclosed fee, rumoured to be around £13.2 million. Zhirkov signed a four-year contract with the Russian team. Zhirkov's first Anzhi goal came in a 2–1 win against Amkar Perm on 29 October 2011, hitting a rebound from a corner into the back of the net.

In his last match for Anzhi, on 1 June 2013, he played the entire match as they lost the Russian Cup final to his former team CSKA Moscow in a penalty shootout following a 1–1 draw. Both Zhirkov and Jucilei missed their penalties.

=== Dynamo ===
On 6 August 2013, Anzhi listed their entire squad up for sale as they announced plans to restructure the business, focusing on youth development. The first players to leave were Igor Denisov, Aleksandr Kokorin and Zhirkov on 15 August 2013, who all joined Dynamo Moscow for undisclosed fees.

Zhirkov played 14 league matches in his first season, scoring three goals: one in a 2–0 win against Krylya Sovetov Samara on his 29 September debut, and two in a 4–2 win over former club CSKA on 9 March.

On 2 October 2014, in added time at the end of their UEFA Europa League group stage match against PSV, substitute Zhirkov scored the only goal of the match for Dynamo.

=== Zenit ===
On 26 January 2016, Zenit Saint Petersburg announced they signed a two-year contract with Zhirkov. If Zenit and Dynamo would be not able to agree on a transfer fee during the winter 2015–16 transfer window, he would have joined Zenit in July 2016 as a free agent, after his Dynamo contract expired. However, the two clubs agreed on transfer fee and he joined Zenit on 30 January.

=== Khimki ===
On 13 January 2022, he signed a contract with Khimki until the end of the 2021–22 season, with an option to extend for an additional year. Zhirkov's contract with Khimki was terminated by mutual consent on 27 June 2022.

=== Retirement ===
Zhirkov announced his retirement from playing on 12 February 2023.

== International career ==
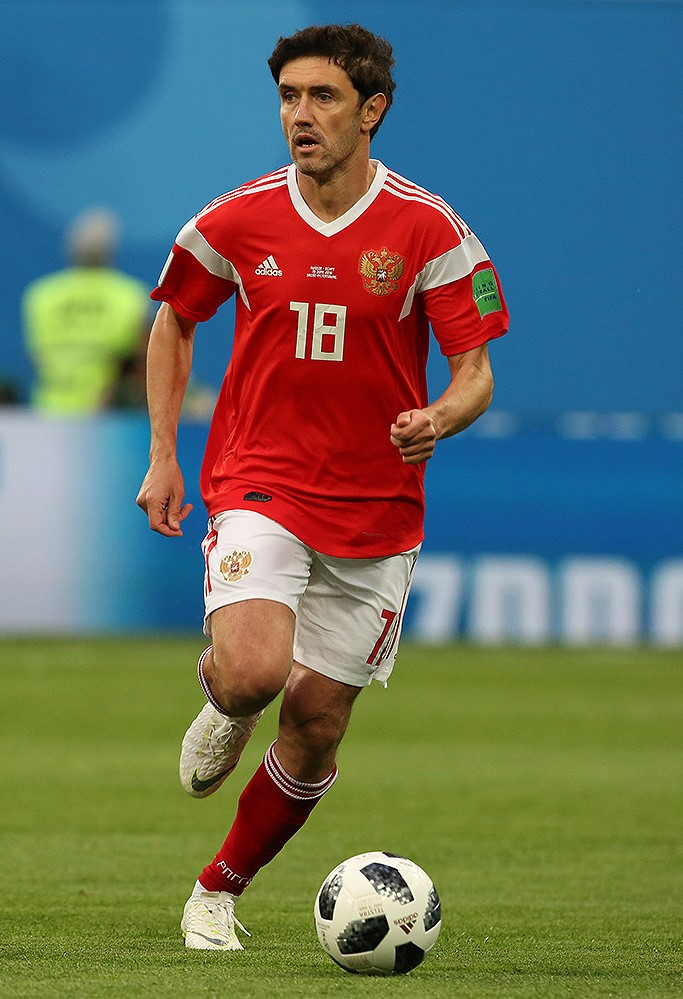
Zhirkov playing for Russia at the 2018 FIFA World Cup

Zhirkov made his debut for Russia on 9 February 2005, starting a 2–0 friendly defeat to Italy in Cagliari.

Zhirkov was named in the UEFA Euro 2008 Team of the Tournament after helping the team to the semi-finals. In October 2008, Zhirkov was named as one of the 30 nominees for the Ballon d'Or award, given to the top player in Europe.

On 18 November 2009, Zhirkov received his first red card for the national side – he was sent off late in the game for a second bookable offence in the dying minutes of Russia's 0–1 away loss to Slovenia in the second leg of the 2010 FIFA World Cup play-off after pushing a Slovenian substitute.

In August 2011, Zhirkov was heckled by Russian fans during a friendly match against Serbia in Moscow nearly every time he contacted the ball; he was even bombarded with a cigarette packet near the corner area. The fans were angered by his move to Anzhi.

Zhirkov was confirmed for Russia's Euro 2012 squad on 25 May 2012, playing in all three of Russia's matches as they were eliminated in the group stage.

On 2 June 2014, Zhirkov was included in Russia's 2014 World Cup squad. In the final preparation match for the tournament, his 61st cap, he scored his first international goal with a volley to open a 2–0 win over Morocco. He featured in one match at the finals, playing 71 minutes of the opening 1–1 draw against South Korea before being replaced by Aleksandr Kerzhakov. Russia again exited the tournament at the group stage.

Zhirkov scored a second international goal on 29 March 2016 in a friendly 4–2 loss to France at the Stade de France.

Zhirkov was not included in Russia's squad for Euro 2016, but returned for the 2017 FIFA Confederations Cup where he was in the starting line-up for all three of the team's matches. On 24 June 2017, he was sent off in Russia's final group match as they were beaten 1–2 by Mexico in Kazan.

On 11 May 2018, he was included in Russia's extended 2018 FIFA World Cup squad. On 3 June 2018, he was included in the finalized World Cup squad. He started in the first two group-stage games, and then returned to the starting line-up in the first knock-out stage game against Spain in the Round of 16. However, his nagging injury forced him to get substituted at half-time of Spain game by Vladimir Granat, and he was not able to appear in the quarterfinal game against Croatia which Russia lost in the penalty shoot-out.

He announced his retirement from the national side following the World Cup. Despite that announcement, he was called up to the national team once again on 16 March 2019 for Euro 2020 qualifiers against Belgium and Kazakhstan. On 18 November 2020, he played his 100th match for Russia in the 2020–21 UEFA Nations League.

On 11 May 2021, he was included in the preliminary extended 30-man squad for UEFA Euro 2020. On 2 June 2021, he was included in the final squad. He started Russia's opening game against Belgium on 12 June 2021, but had to be substituted in the first half due to leg injury. He did not appear in Russia's two remaining games due to his injury as they were eliminated at group stage.

== Coaching career ==
On 10 January 2026, Zhirkov was hired by Dynamo Moscow as an assistant coach to Rolan Gusev. He left Dynamo with Gusev in June 2026.

== Personal life ==
=== Family ===
Zhirkov has a sister and two brothers. The younger brother, Nikolai Zhirkov, played for the CSKA Youth Team. Zhirkov married on 1 February 2008 to a Russian model, Inna. On 8 September 2008, their son Dmitriy was born. In 2010, their daughter Milana was born and in 2015 the pair had a second son.

=== Accidents ===
Zhirkov has had two automotive accidents in his life. The first accident occurred in January 2005 in Tambov. Zhirkov, driving on a high speed track, hit a pole while trying to avoid a merging racer. His airbags deployed, leaving him with only minor injuries. On 18 December 2008, Zhirkov was in an accident in Kaliningrad. He left this accident unharmed.

=== Education ===
Yuri Zhirkov received his secondary education at school No. 19, after which he entered the school and began training in the specialty of an electrical technician. Upon graduation, he received a diploma of secondary technical education. In December 2008, Zhirkov graduated from Tambov State University.

== Career statistics ==
=== Club ===
As of 28 May 2022

| Club | Season | League | | | Cup | | Continental | | Other | | Total | |
| Club | Season | Division | Apps | Goals | Apps | Goals | Apps | Goals | Apps | Goals | Apps | Goals |
|---|---|---|---|---|---|---|---|---|---|---|---|---|
| Spartak Tambov | 2001 | PFL | 4 | 0 | 0 | 0 | – | | – | | 4 | 0 |
| Spartak Tambov | 2002 | PFL | 37 | 10 | 2 | 0 | – | | – | | 39 | 10 |
| Spartak Tambov | 2003 | PFL | 33 | 16 | 3 | 0 | – | | – | | 36 | 16 |
| Spartak Tambov | Total | | 74 | 26 | 5 | 0 | – | | – | | 79 | 26 |
| CSKA Moscow | 2004 | Russian Premier League | 25 | 6 | 2 | 0 | 10 | 0 | 1 (Note: Appearance in the Russian Super Cup) | 0 | 38 | 6 |
| CSKA Moscow | 2005 | Russian Premier League | 20 | 2 | 6 | 0 | 13 | 1 | – | | 39 | 3 |
| CSKA Moscow | 2006 | Russian Premier League | 27 | 1 | 6 | 1 | 8 | 1 | 1 | 1 | 42 | 4 |
| CSKA Moscow | 2007 | Russian Premier League | 29 | 2 | 5 | 1 | 8 | 0 | 1 | 0 | 43 | 3 |
| CSKA Moscow | 2008 | Russian Premier League | 28 | 3 | 2 | 0 | 6 | 1 | – | | 36 | 4 |
| CSKA Moscow | 2009 | Russian Premier League | 10 | 1 | 3 | 1 | 3 | 1 | 1 | 0 | 17 | 3 |
| CSKA Moscow | Total | | 139 | 15 | 24 | 3 | 48 | 4 | 4 | 1 | 215 | 23 |
| Chelsea | 2009–10 | Premier League | 17 | 0 | 4 | 0 | 4 | 0 | 2 (Note: Appearance(s) in the Football League Cup) | 0 | 27 | 0 |
| Chelsea | 2010–11 | Premier League | 12 | 0 | 1 | 0 | 7 | 1 | 2 (Note: One appearance in the Football League Cup, one appearance in the FA Community Shield) | 0 | 22 | 1 |
| Chelsea | Total | | 29 | 0 | 5 | 0 | 11 | 1 | 4 | 0 | 49 | 1 |
| Anzhi Makhachkala | 2011–12 | Russian Premier League | 23 | 1 | 1 | 0 | – | | – | | 24 | 1 |
| Anzhi Makhachkala | 2012–13 | Russian Premier League | 23 | 2 | 4 | 0 | 12 | 0 | – | | 39 | 2 |
| Anzhi Makhachkala | Total | | 46 | 3 | 5 | 0 | 12 | 0 | – | | 63 | 3 |
| Dynamo Moscow | 2013–14 | Russian Premier League | 14 | 3 | 0 | 0 | – | | – | | 14 | 3 |
| Dynamo Moscow | 2014–15 | Russian Premier League | 24 | 0 | 1 | 0 | 10 | 2 | – | | 35 | 2 |
| Dynamo Moscow | 2015–16 | Russian Premier League | 16 | 0 | 2 | 0 | – | | – | | 18 | 0 |
| Dynamo Moscow | Total | | 54 | 3 | 3 | 0 | 10 | 2 | – | | 67 | 5 |
| Zenit Saint Petersburg | 2015–16 | Russian Premier League | 9 | 0 | 2 | 0 | 2 | 0 | – | | 13 | 0 |
| Zenit Saint Petersburg | 2016–17 | Russian Premier League | 21 | 1 | 1 | 0 | 6 | 0 | 1 | 0 | 29 | 1 |
| Zenit Saint Petersburg | 2017–18 | Russian Premier League | 17 | 1 | 1 | 0 | 7 | 0 | – | | 25 | 1 |
| Zenit Saint Petersburg | 2018–19 | Russian Premier League | 12 | 0 | 0 | 0 | 0 | 0 | – | | 12 | 0 |
| Zenit Saint Petersburg | 2019–20 | Russian Premier League | 21 | 2 | 4 | 1 | 2 | 0 | 1 | 0 | 28 | 3 |
| Zenit Saint Petersburg | 2020–21 | Russian Premier League | 15 | 0 | 1 | 0 | 3 | 0 | 1 | 0 | 20 | 0 |
| Zenit Saint Petersburg | Total | | 95 | 4 | 9 | 1 | 20 | 0 | 3 | 0 | 127 | 5 |
| Khimki | 2021–22 | Russian Premier League | 3 | 0 | – | | – | | – | | 3 | 0 |
| Career total | | | 440 | 51 | 51 | 4 | 101 | 7 | 11 | 1 | 603 | 63 |

=== International ===
As of match played 12 June 2021

| National team | Year | Apps | Goals |
|---|---|---|---|
| Russia | 2005 | 4 | 0 |
| Russia | 2006 | 3 | 0 |
| Russia | 2007 | 9 | 0 |
| Russia | 2008 | 12 | 0 |
| Russia | 2009 | 6 | 0 |
| Russia | 2010 | 5 | 0 |
| Russia | 2011 | 9 | 0 |
| Russia | 2012 | 7 | 0 |
| Russia | 2013 | 4 | 0 |
| Russia | 2014 | 3 | 1 |
| Russia | 2015 | 5 | 0 |
| Russia | 2016 | 5 | 1 |
| Russia | 2017 | 8 | 0 |
| Russia | 2018 | 7 | 0 |
| Russia | 2019 | 5 | 0 |
| Russia | 2020 | 8 | 0 |
| Russia | 2021 | 5 | 0 |
| Russia | Total | 105 | 2 |

International goals

Russia's score listed first. Score after each Zhirkov goal.

| No. | Date | Venue | Opponent | Score | Result | Competition |
|---|---|---|---|---|---|---|
| 1. | 6 June 2014 | Lokomotiv Stadium, Moscow, Russia | Morocco | 1–0 | 2–0 | Friendly |
| 2. | 29 March 2016 | Stade de France, Saint-Denis, France | France | 2–3 | 2–4 | Friendly |

== Honours ==
CSKA Moscow

- Russian Premier League: 2005, 2006
- Russian Cup: 2004–05, 2005–06, 2007–08, 2008–09
- Russian Super Cup: 2004, 2006, 2007, 2009
- UEFA Cup: 2004–05

Chelsea

- Premier League: 2009–10
- FA Cup: 2009–10

Zenit Saint Petersburg

- Russian Premier League: 2018–19, 2019–20, 2020–21
- Russian Cup: 2015–16, 2019–20
- Russian Super Cup: 2016, 2020

Russia

- UEFA European Championship bronze: 2008

Individual

- UEFA European Championship Team of the Tournament: 2008
- Futbol Footballer of the Year in Russia: 2008
- Russian Premier League Left Winger of the Year: 2005, 2006, 2007, 2008, 2011–12
- Russian Premier League Left-back of the Year: 2018–19, 2019–20

== See also ==
- List of men's footballers with 100 or more international caps
