= 2007 Russian Super Cup =

Football match

The 2007 Russian Super Cup was the 5th Russian Super Cup match, a football match which was to be contested between the 2006 Russian Premier League champion and the winner of 2005–06 Russian Cup. However, because the same team won both the league and the cup for the second consecutive season, the match was contested between the champion and the runner-up of the Russian Premier League, CSKA Moscow and Spartak Moscow, respectively, also for the second consecutive season. The match was held on 3 March 2007 at the Luzhniki Stadium in Moscow, Russia. CSKA Moscow beat Spartak Moscow 4–2 to win their third overall and second consecutive Russian Super Cup.

== Match details ==
3 March 2007
16:00 MSK

CSKA Moscow	4–2	Spartak Moscow
Vágner Love 1'; Ignashevich 51'; Jô 63', 79'	Report	Bazhenov 47'; Torbinskiy 61'

Luzhniki, Moscow
Attendance: 45,000
Referee: Aleksandr Gvardis (Kaliningrad)

CSKA Moscow:
GK	35	(Russia) Igor Akinfeev
DF	4	(Russia) Sergei Ignashevich (c)	(yellow card) 90'
DF	6	(Russia) Aleksei Berezutski
DF	24	(Russia) Vasili Berezutski
MF	10	(Brazil) Jô	(yellow card) 73'
MF	17	(Serbia) Miloš Krasić		(substituted off) 90'
MF	18	(Russia) Yuri Zhirkov
MF	20	(Brazil) Dudu Cearense
MF	22	(Russia) Evgeni Aldonin		(substituted off) 46'
MF	25	(Bosnia and Herzegovina) Elvir Rahimić
FW	9	(Brazil) Vágner Love		(substituted off) 89'
Substitutes:
GK	1	(Russia) Veniamin Mandrykin
DF	2	(Lithuania) Deividas Šemberas		(substituted on) 46'
DF	50	(Russia) Anton Grigoryev
MF	8	(Russia) Rolan Gusev
MF	39	(Russia) Ivan Taranov		(substituted on) 90'
MF	57	(Russia) Sergei Gorelov
FW	5	(Brazil) Ramón		(substituted on) 89'
Manager:
(Russia) Valery Gazzaev Assistant referees: (Russia) Valery Bulygin (Russia) Ildar Zaripov; Fourth official: (Russia) Aleksei Nikolaev

Spartak Moscow:
GK	30	(Poland) Wojciech Kowalewski	(yellow card) 50'
DF	2	(Brazil) Antônio Géder		(substituted off) 46'
DF	3	(Austria) Martin Stranzl
DF	13	(Czech Republic) Martin Jiránek
DF	49	(Russia) Roman Shishkin
MF	5	(Brazil) Mozart	(yellow card) 50'
MF	7	(Russia) Denis Boyarintsev		(substituted off) 46'
MF	9	(Russia) Yegor Titov (c)
MF	15	(Czech Republic) Radoslav Kováč
FW	32	(Russia) Nikita Bazhenov		(substituted off) 82'
FW	40	(Russia) Artyom Dzyuba
Substitutes:
GK	1	(Russia) Dmitri Khomich
DF	34	(Russia) Renat Sabitov
DF	36	(Russia) Fyodor Kudryashov
MF	11	(Russia) Aleksandr Pavlenko		(substituted on) 82'
MF	14	(Russia) Dmitri Torbinski		(substituted on) 46'
MF	25	(Ukraine) Maksym Kalynychenko		(substituted on) 46'
FW	18	(Russia) Aleksandr Prudnikov
Manager:
(Russia) Vladimir Fedotov

== See also ==
- 2007 in Russian football
- 2006 Russian Premier League
- 2005–06 Russian Cup
