= Bojan Krasić =

Serbian footballer (born 1983)

Personal information
- Full name: Bojan Krasić
- Date of birth: 4 January 1983 (age 43)
- Place of birth: Titova Mitrovica, SFR Yugoslavia
- Height: 1.85 m (6 ft 1 in)
- Position: Centre-back

Senior career*
Years	Team	Apps	(Gls)
2001–2006	Vojvodina	7	(0)
2002–2004	→ Mladost Lukićevo (loan)	64	(3)
2004	→ Mladost Gacko (loan)		
2005	→ Radnički Obrenovac (loan)	15	(1)
2007–2008	ČSK Čelarevo	16	(1)
2009	Banat Zrenjanin	1	(0)
2009–2010	Proleter Novi Sad	9	(0)
2010–2011	Inđija	0	(0)
2012–2013	Proleter Novi Sad	17	(0)
2013	Inđija	0	(0)
2014	Cement Beočin		
- * Club domestic league appearances and goals

Bojan Krasić (Serbian Cyrillic: Бојан Красић; born 4 January 1983) is a Serbian retired football defender. He is the older brother of Miloš Krasić.
