= Dmitri Torbinski =

Russian footballer (born 1984)

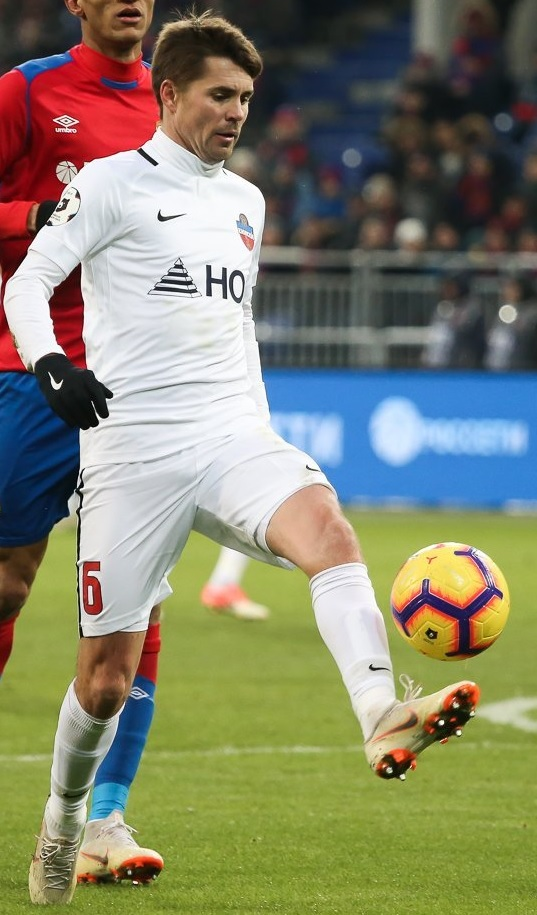
- Torbinski with Yenisey Krasnoyarsk in 2018

Personal information
- Full name: Dmitri Evgenyevich Torbinski
- Date of birth: 28 April 1984 (age 42)
- Place of birth: Norilsk, Russian SFSR, Soviet Union
- Height: 1.76 m (5 ft 9 1/2 in)
- Position: Midfielder

Team information
- Current team: Miami United (U-21 manager)

Youth career
- 1996–2001: Spartak Moscow

Senior career*
Years	Team	Apps	(Gls)
2001–2007	Spartak Moscow	43	(3)
2005	→ Spartak Chelyabinsk (loan)	24	(4)
2008–2013	Lokomotiv Moscow	115	(8)
2013–2014	Rubin Kazan	29	(2)
2014–2015	Rostov	32	(2)
2015–2017	Krasnodar	47	(0)
2018	Pafos	3	(0)
2018	Baltika Kaliningrad	18	(1)
2018–2019	Yenisey Krasnoyarsk	14	(1)
Total		325	(21)

International career^{‡}
2005–2006	Russia U-21	9	(1)
2007–2016	Russia	30	(2)

Managerial career
- 2020–: Miami United (U-21)
- * Club domestic league appearances and goals as of 26 May 2019 ‡ National team caps and goals as of 5 June 2016

Dmitri Yevgenyevich Torbinski (Russian: Дмитрий Евгеньевич Торбинский; born 28 April 1984) is a Russian former professional footballer who played as a midfielder. He was a central midfielder and winger known for his pace and accurate crosses.

== Club career ==
Torbinski began his career as a futsal player, but has then moved into football and joined the Spartak's youth academy at a young age. He toiled for several years in the reserve team before making his first team debut in 2002. He continued his career as a part-time player in the squad in 2003, but was limited by a serious injury in 2004, making only one appearance.

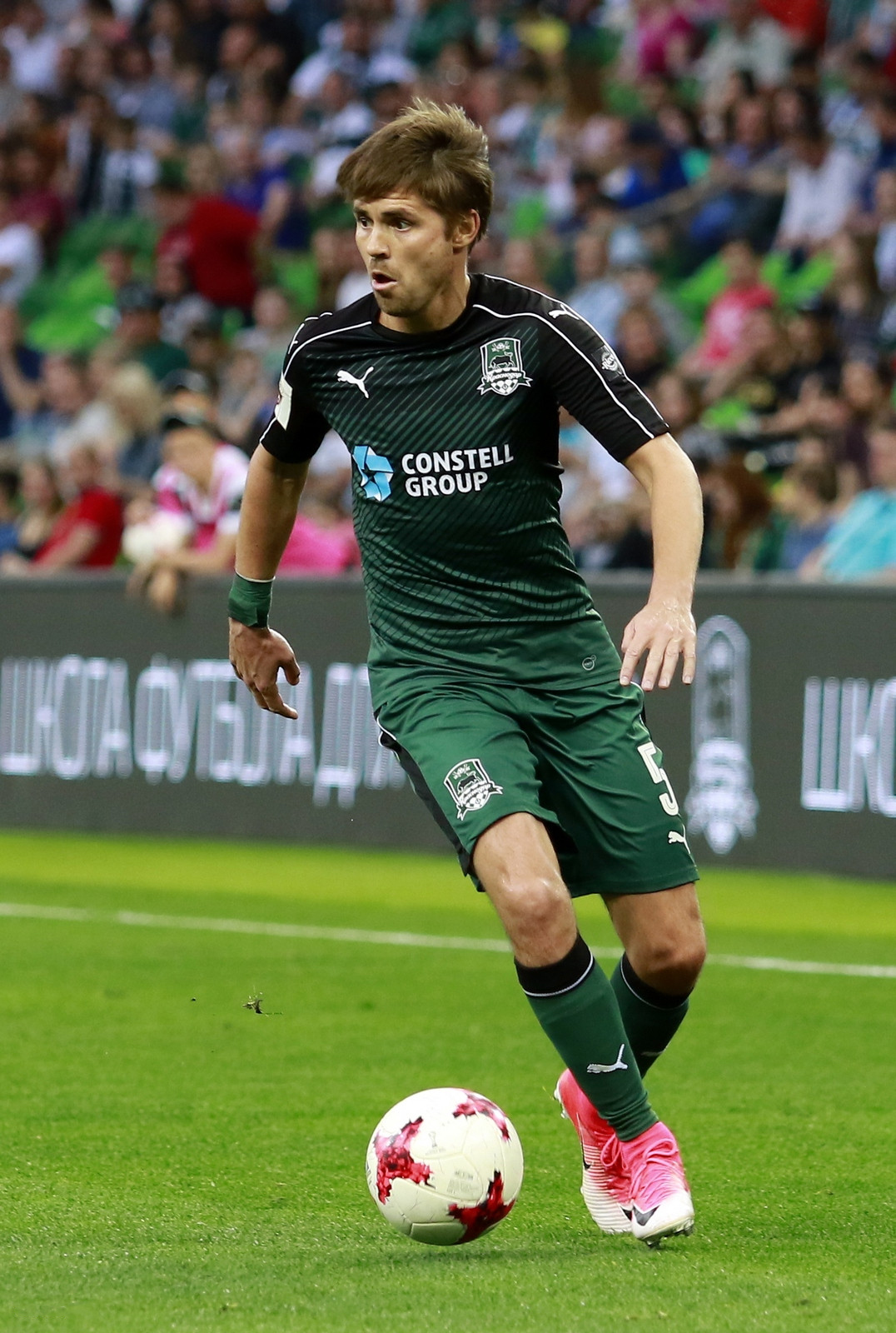
Krasnodar - Anzhi

In 2005, Dmitri was decided to play for Spartak Chelyabinsk in order to get regular playing time and has then returned to Spartak Moscow. Torbinski left the club on a free transfer at the end of 2007 season going to Lokomotiv Moscow.

In July 2014, Torbinski joined FC Rostov.

On 14 December 2017, Torbinski signed a contract with the Cypriot club Pafos FC. After just three games for the club, he returned to Russia, signing with FC Baltika Kaliningrad in February 2018.

On 30 August 2018, he returned to the top-tier Russian Premier League, signing a one-year contract with FC Yenisey Krasnoyarsk. Since 02/25/2020, Torbinski is a Miami United F.C (USA, Florida) under 21 coach.

== International career ==
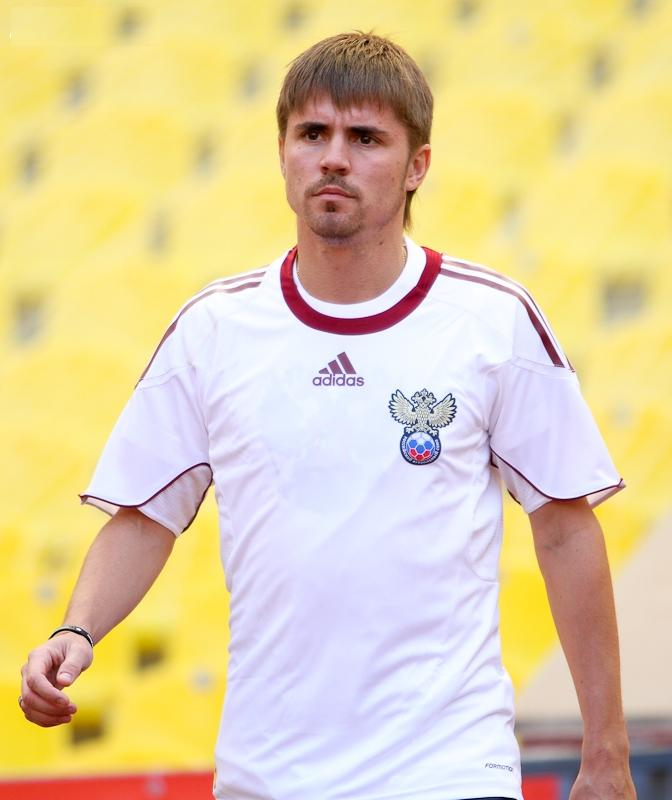
Torbinski with the Russia national football team in 2011

Torbinski made his debut in the Russian national team on 24 March 2007 in a game against Estonia and was called up to play for Russia in UEFA Euro 2008.

Torbinski came on as a substitute in the quarter-finals in a match against the Netherlands and scored a goal in extra-time to put Russia 2–1 ahead. Russia eventually won 3–1 advancing to the semi-finals.

He has not been called up for the national team from 2012 to 2014, returning to the squad on 27 March 2015 in an UEFA Euro 2016 qualifier against Montenegro. The game was abandoned with the score of 0–0 due to undisciplined behavior of the Montenegrin fans. He was included in the UEFA Euro 2016 squad, but did not play in any game at the tournament.

=== International goals ===
Scores and results list Russia's goal tally first.

#	Date	Venue	Opponent	Score	Result	Competition
1.	23 May 2008	Lokomotiv Stadium, Moscow, Russia	Kazakhstan	5–0	6–0	Friendly
2.	21 June 2008	St. Jakob-Park, Basel, Switzerland	Netherlands	2–1	3–1	UEFA Euro 2008

== Honors ==
=== International ===
Russia

- UEFA European Championship bronze medalist: 2008

== Career statistics ==
As of 14 December 2017

Club	Season	League			Cup		Continental		Other		Total	
Club	Season	Division	Apps	Goals	Apps	Goals	Apps	Goals	Apps	Goals	Apps	Goals
Spartak Moscow	2001	Russian Premier League	0	0	0	0	0	0	–		0	0
Spartak Moscow	2002	Russian Premier League	3	0	1	0	2	0	–		6	0
Spartak Moscow	2003	Russian Premier League	3	0	2	0	2	0	4 (Note: Four appearances in the Russian Premier League Cup)	0	11	0
Spartak Moscow	2004	Russian Premier League	0	0	1	0	0	0	–		1	0
Spartak Chelyabinsk	2005	FNL	24	4	1	0	–		–		25	4
Spartak Moscow	2005	Russian Premier League	0	0	0	0	–		–		0	0
Spartak Moscow	2006	Russian Premier League	13	0	2	0	3	0	–		18	0
Spartak Moscow	2007	Russian Premier League	24	3	6	1	8	0	1 (Note: One appearance in the Russian Super Cup)	1	39	5
Spartak Moscow	Total (2 spells)		43	3	12	1	15	0	5	1	75	5
Lokomotiv Moscow	2008	Russian Premier League	20	3	1	0	–		1 (Note: One appearance in the Russian Super Cup)	0	22	3
Lokomotiv Moscow	2009	Russian Premier League	17	1	0	0	–		–		17	1
Lokomotiv Moscow	2010	Russian Premier League	17	0	0	0	2	0	–		19	0
Lokomotiv Moscow	2011–12	Russian Premier League	34	1	2	0	5	0	–		41	1
Lokomotiv Moscow	2012–13	Russian Premier League	15	3	1	0	–		–		16	3
Lokomotiv Moscow	2013–14	Russian Premier League	0	0	0	0	–		–		0	0
Lokomotiv Moscow	Total		103	8	4	0	7	0	1	0	115	8
Rubin Kazan	2013–14	Russian Premier League	19	1	1	0	9	1	–		29	2
Rostov	2014–15	Russian Premier League	27	2	0	0	2	0	3 (Note: One appearance in the Russian Super Cup, two appearances in the relegation play-offs)	0	32	2
Krasnodar	2015–16	Russian Premier League	15	0	2	0	7	0	–		24	0
Krasnodar	2016–17	Russian Premier League	12	0	1	0	8	0	–		21	0
Krasnodar	Total		27	0	3	0	15	0	0	0	45	0
Pafos	2017–18	Cypriot First Division	3	0	0	0	–		–		3	0
Career total			246	18	21	1	48	1	9	1	324	21
