= Eduardo Ratinho =

Brazilian footballer (born 1987)

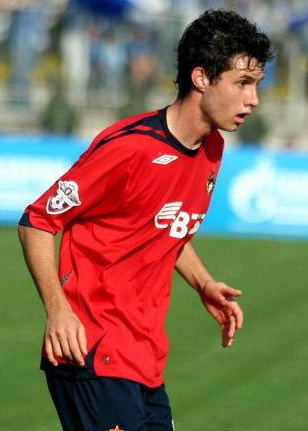
- Eduardo Ratinho with CSKA Moscow in 2007

Personal information
- Full name: Eduardo Correia Piller Filho
- Date of birth: 17 September 1987 (age 39)
- Place of birth: São Paulo, Brazil
- Height: 1.81 m (5 ft 11 1/2 in)
- Position: Right back

Youth career
- 2003–2004: Corinthians

Senior career*
Years	Team	Apps	(Gls)
2005–2010	Corinthians	42	(1)
2007	→ CSKA Moscow (loan)	6	(1)
2008	→ Toulouse (loan)	0	(0)
2008–2009	→ Fluminense (loan)	8	(0)
2009	→ Santo André (loan)	6	(0)
2010	→ Sport Recife (loan)	9	(1)
2011	Botafogo (SP)	0	(0)
2012	Bonsucesso	0	(0)
2012–2013	Audax São Paulo		

International career
2007	Brazil U-20	2	(0)
- * Club domestic league appearances and goals as of 13 November 2010

Eduardo Correia Piller Filho, or simply Eduardo Ratinho, (born 17 September 1987) is a Brazilian former footballer who played as a right back. Eduardo Ratinho was known for his speed, technique, dribbling skills and free kick ability.

== Career ==
Eduardo Ratinho made his Corinthians debut on 17 August 2005 in a 2-0 victory over Goiás, for the Campeonato Brasileiro Série A. In 2007, he was loaned to Russian club CSKA Moscow. In January 2008, Eduardo Ratinho signed with French club Toulouse FC. Seven months later, Eduardo Ratinho was then loaned by Toulouse to Fluminense for the 2008 Campeonato Brasileiro Série A.

== National team ==
Eduardo has been capped at Under-20 level and was named in the Brazilian 2007 U-20 World Cup squad for the FIFA U-20 World Cup.

== Honours ==
- Corinthians
  - Brazilian Série A: 2005.
- Campeonato Pernambucano in 2010 with Sport Recife
