= Vasili Penyasov =

Russian footballer

Personal information
- Full name: Vasili Nikolayevich Penyasov
- Date of birth: 27 July 1987 (age 39)
- Height: 1.95 m (6 ft 5 in)
- Position: Defender

Senior career*
Years	Team	Apps	(Gls)
2004	FC Yunost Tolyatti		
2005	SKP Tolyatti		
2006	FC Energetik Uren	22	(2)
2007	PFC CSKA Moscow	0	(0)
2007	FC Sodovik Sterlitamak	10	(0)
2008	FC Tyumen	27	(1)
2009	FC Academia Dimitrovgrad	18	(1)
2011–2012	FC Znamya Truda Orekhovo-Zuyevo	40	(3)
2012	FC Sergiyevsk		
2013	FC Sergiyevsk		
2014	VKS-KSDYuSShOR #12 Lada Tolyatti		
2015	FC Sergiyevsk		
- * Club domestic league appearances and goals

Vasili Nikolayevich Penyasov (Russian: Василий Николаевич Пенясов; born 27 July 1987) is a former Russian professional football player.

== Club career ==
He played in the Russian Football National League for FC Sodovik Sterlitamak in 2007.
