= Dudu Cearense =

Brazilian footballer (born 1983)

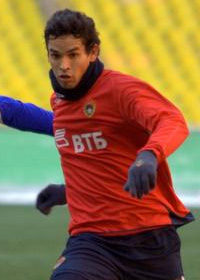
- Dudu with CSKA Moscow in February 2007

Personal information
- Full name: Alessandro Silva de Sousa
- Date of birth: 15 April 1983 (age 43)
- Place of birth: Fortaleza, Brazil
- Height: 1.86 m (6 ft 1 in)
- Position: Central midfielder

Youth career
- 1998: Ceará
- 1998–2000: Vitória

Senior career*
Years	Team	Apps	(Gls)
2000–2003	Vitória	49	(6)
2004	Kashiwa Reysol	11	(2)
2004–2005	Rennes	15	(1)
2005–2008	CSKA Moscow	74	(8)
2008–2011	Olympiacos	64	(7)
2011–2012	Atlético Mineiro	17	(3)
2012–2013	Goiás	23	(2)
2014	OFI	11	(3)
2014	Maccabi Netanya	0	(0)
2015–2016	Fortaleza	7	(2)
2016–2018	Botafogo	29	(1)

International career
2002–2003	Brazil U-20	16	(7)
2003–2004	Brazil U-23	9	(3)
2004–2007	Brazil	12	(0)
Medal record
Representing Brazil
Copa América
Winner	2004 Peru
FIFA U-20 World Cup
Winner	2003 UAE
- * Club domestic league appearances and goals

Alexandro Silva de Sousa (born 15 April 1983), known as Dudu Cearense or simply Dudu, is a Brazilian former professional footballer.

He is known for his passing, aerial ability and tackling. He was a central midfielder who usually played either in a holding midfield role or as a box-to-box midfielder. Despite often being used in a defensive position, he was mainly an attacking player. He has been capped for the Brazil national team.

== Career ==
Dudu was born in Fortaleza, Ceará.

In February 2005, after spending half a season playing for Rennes in France, Dudu transferred to CSKA Moscow, where he joined and played with fellow Brazilians Daniel Carvalho, Vágner Love, and later Jô.

In 2007, Dudu expressed his wish to leave CSKA Moscow. Olympiacos tried to sign him, but failed. In 2008, Olympiacos offered the Russian club €6 million. The offer was accepted and the player signed a three-year contract on 6 August 2008. In May 2009, he signed a new contract with the Greek club which would last until June 2013 with a buyout clause of €8.5 million.

On 7 April 2011, Olympiacos agreed to sell Dudu Cearense to Atlético Mineiro for a fee of €1.1 million. Dudu signed a three-year contract with the Brazilian team. In 2012 he moved to Goiás until the end of his contract in January 2014. Goiás wanted to extend with the player but he wanted to return to Europe. On 27 January 2014, he agreed a 1.5-year contract with Greek Club OFI.

On 5 June 2014, he agreed for a one-year contract worth $245,000 with Maccabi Netanya of the Israel Premier League (biggest contract in the history of the club). Three weeks later, it was reported Dudu was injured and in poor shape. He was released on 22 September. He never played for Netanya in the league and only made two appearances in the Toto Cup. He is considered the biggest flop in the club's history, mainly for the fact he never even played once in the league and the club had to pay $50,000 compensation after his release.

On 10 January 2015, he returned to Brazil and agreed to a contract with Fortaleza.

== Career statistics ==
=== Club ===
As of match played 22 February 2018

Appearances and goals by club, season and competition
Club	Season	League			National Cup		League Cup		Continental		Other		Total	
Club	Season	Division	Apps	Goals	Apps	Goals	Apps	Goals	Apps	Goals	Apps	Goals	Apps	Goals
Vitória	2001	Série A	0	0			–		–				0	0
Vitória	2002	Série A	18	0			–		–				18	0
Vitória	2003	Série A	31	6			–		–				31	6
Vitória	Total		49	6			-	-	-	-			49	6
Kashiwa Reysol	2004	J1 League	11	2	0	0	3	0	–		–		14	2
Stade Rennais	2004–05	Ligue 1	15	1					–		–		15	1
CSKA Moscow	2005	Russian Premier League	21	3	1	0	-		3	0	1	0	26	3
CSKA Moscow	2006	Russian Premier League	28	2	7	2	-		8	1	1	0	44	5
CSKA Moscow	2007	Russian Premier League	15	1	2	0	-		7	0	1	0	25	1
CSKA Moscow	2008	Russian Premier League	10	1	2	0	-		0	0	-		12	1
CSKA Moscow	Total		74	7	12	2	-	-	18	1	3	0	107	10
Olympiacos	2008–09	Super League Greece	26	3			-		7	1	-		33	4
Olympiacos	2009–10	Super League Greece	20	4			-		10	1	-		30	5
Olympiacos	2010–11	Super League Greece	19	0			-		4	3	-		23	3
Olympiacos	Total		65	7			-	-	21	5	-	-	86	12
Atlético Mineiro	2011	Série A	13	3			–		–				13	3
Atlético Mineiro	2012	Série A	4	0			–		–				4	0
Atlético Mineiro	Total		17	3			-	-	-	-			17	3
Goiás	2012	Série B	4	1			–		–				4	1
Goiás	2013	Série A	19	1	7	0	–		–		16	5	42	6
Goiás	Total		23	2	7	0	-	-	-	-	16	5	46	7
OFI	2013–14	Super League Greece	11	3	3	1	–		–		–		14	4
Maccabi Netanya	2014–15	Israeli Premier League	0	0	0	0	2	0	–		–		2	0
Fortaleza	2015	Série C	6	2	2	0	–		–		7	0	15	2
Fortaleza	2016	Série C	1	0	3	0	–		–		16	2	20	2
Fortaleza	Total		7	2	5	0	-	-	-	-	23	2	35	4
Botafogo	2016	Série A	16	1	1	0	–		–		0	0	16	1
Botafogo	2017	Série A	13	0	1	0	–		4	0	7	1	24	1
Botafogo	2018	Série A	0	0	0	0	–		–		4	0	4	0
Botafogo	Total		29	1	2	0	-	-	4	0	11	1	46	2
Career total			301	34	29	3	2	0	43	6	53	8	428	51

=== International ===
National team	Year	Apps	Goals
Brazil	2004	4	0
Brazil	2005	0	0
Brazil	2006	5	0
Brazil	2007	2	0
Brazil	Total	11	0

== Honours ==
=== Club ===
Vitória

- Supercampeonato Baiano: 2002
- Campeonato Baiano: 2002, 2003
- Copa do Nordeste: 2003

CSKA Moscow

- Russian Premier League: 2005, 2006
- Russian Super Cup: 2006, 2007
- Russian Cup: 2005/2006, 2008

Olympiacos

- Super League Greece: 2009, 2011
- Greek Cup: 2009

Atlético Mineiro

- Campeonato Mineiro: 2012

Goiás

- Campeonato Brasileiro Série B: 2012
- Goiás State League: 2013

Fortaleza

- Campeonato Cearense: 2016

Botafogo

- Campeonato Carioca: 2018

=== International ===
Brazil

- Copa América Winner: 2004

Brazil U-20

- FIFA World Youth Championship Winner: 2003

=== Individual ===
- FIFA World Youth Championship Golden Shoe: 2003
- FIFA World Youth Championship Silver Ball: 2003
