= Vitali Tikhonov =

Russian footballer

Personal information
- Full name: Vitali Viktorovich Tikhonov
- Date of birth: 31 January 1984 (age 42)
- Place of birth: Kazan, Russian SFSR
- Height: 1.88 m (6 ft 2 in)
- Position: Defender

Youth career
- FC Rubin Kazan

Senior career*
Years	Team	Apps	(Gls)
2000–2003	FC Rubin-2 Kazan (amateur)		
2003	FC Rubin Kazan	0	(0)
2004–2008	FC Rubin-2 Kazan	116	(5)
2009–2010	FC Vostok	18	(0)
2011	FC Khimik Dzerzhinsk	24	(0)
2012	FC Dynamo Kirov	25	(1)
2013	FC Bugulma-RUNAKO Bugulma		
2014	FC Avangard-DYuSSh-Savinovo Kazan		
2014–2015	FC Dynamo Kirov	19	(0)
- * Club domestic league appearances and goals

Vitali Viktorovich Tikhonov (Russian: Виталий Викторович Тихонов; born 31 January 1984) is a former Russian professional footballer.

== Club career ==
He played in the Kazakhstan Premier League for FC Vostok in 2009.
