= Ramón (footballer, born 1988) =

Brazilian footballer

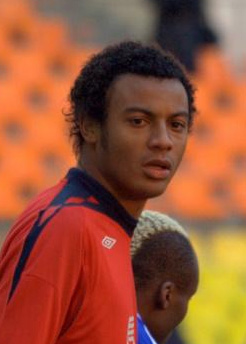

Personal information
- Full name: Ramón Osni Moreira Lage
- Date of birth: 24 May 1988 (age 38)
- Place of birth: Nova Era, Brazil
- Height: 1.82 m (6 ft 0 in)
- Position: Attacking midfielder

Youth career
- 2003–2005: Atlético Mineiro

Senior career*
Years	Team	Apps	(Gls)
2005	Atlético Mineiro	44	(12)
2006	Corinthians	12	(1)
2007–2012	CSKA Moscow	25	(1)
2009	→ Krylya Sovetov (loan)	1	(0)
2010	→ Flamengo (loan)	2	(0)
2011	→ Bahia (loan)	0	(0)
2012	Náutico	3	(0)
2012	Hokkaido Consadole Sapporo	10	(1)
2013–2014	Remo		
2014	Brasiliense		
2014	Goianésia	1	(0)
2015	Araxá		
2015–2016	Democrata		
2016	Brasiliense	0	(0)
2017	Rio Verde	5	(0)
2018	Democrata-GV		
2019–2021	Capital CF		
- * Club domestic league appearances and goals

Ramón Osni Moreira Lage (born 24 May 1988), or simply Ramón, is a Brazilian former football attacking midfielder.

== Career ==
Ramon started his professional career with Atlético Mineiro, before moving to Corinthians in 2006. In Brazil, many used to compare his playing style to that of Kaká. In 2007, Ramon moved to CSKA Moscow, despite being targeted by Arsenal and A.C. Milan, according to some rumours. Ramon scored one goal for CSKA against their fierce rivals Spartak Moscow in the final of the First Channel Cup, an annual exhibition tournament held in Israel. CSKA went on to beat Spartak 3–2. Ramon scored his first league goal for CSKA in the Russian Premier League second-round derby against Lokomotiv Moscow in March 2007.

In August 2009 he was loaned to Krylya Sovetov.

In December 2010 CSKA president Evgenii Giner said: "I think Ramon has finished with football. He is a talented footballer, but the ones like him finish standing by the beer stand bragging about past glories."

== Honours ==
Brazil (u-17 team)

- South American Under-17 Football Championship: 2005
- FIFA U-17 World Championship runner-up: 2005

CSKA Moscow

- Russian Super Cup: 2007, 2009
- Russian Premier League runner-up: 2008
