= Anton Grigoryev =

Russian footballer

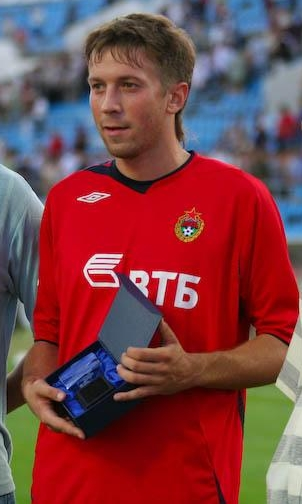
- Grigoryev with CSKA Moscow in 2008

Personal information
- Full name: Anton Vladimirovich Grigoryev
- Date of birth: 13 December 1985 (age 40)
- Place of birth: Moscow, Russian SFSR
- Height: 1.89 m (6 ft 2 in)
- Position: Central defender

Youth career
- Dynamo Moscow

Senior career*
| Years | Team | Apps | (Gls) |
| 2004–2010 | CSKA Moscow | 35 | (0) |
| 2010 | → Kuban (loan) | 30 | (0) |
| 2011–2013 | Alania Vladikavkaz | 79 | (6) |
| 2014 | Tosno | 3 | (0) |
| 2014 | Veris Chișinău | 7 | (0) |
| 2015 | Atyrau | 31 | (4) |
| 2016 | Taraz | 15 | (0) |
| 2017–2018 | Volgar Astrakhan | 35 | (1) |
| 2018 | Spartak Vladikavkaz | 10 | (0) |
| 2019–2020 | Kuban-Holding Pavlovskaya (amateur) | | |
| 2020 | Kuban-Holding Pavlovskaya | 2 | (0) |

International career
| 2007 | Russia U-21 | 1 | (0) |
- * Club domestic league appearances and goals

Anton Vladimirovich Grigoryev (Russian: Антон Владимирович Григорьев; born 13 December 1985) is a Russian former football central defender.

== Club career ==
Grigoryev made one appearance in UEFA Champions League 2006-07 for CSKA coming as a substitute vs Hamburg.
On 17 February 2014 he signed for FC Tosno.

In January 2015, Grigoryev went on trial with FC Sakhalin Yuzhno-Sakhalinsk, before signing for FC Atyrau of the Kazakhstan Premier League.

In June 2016, after six-months without a club, Grigoryev signed for FC Taraz.

== Career honours ==
- Russian Cup: 2008, 2009
