= Evgeni Aldonin =

Russian footballer

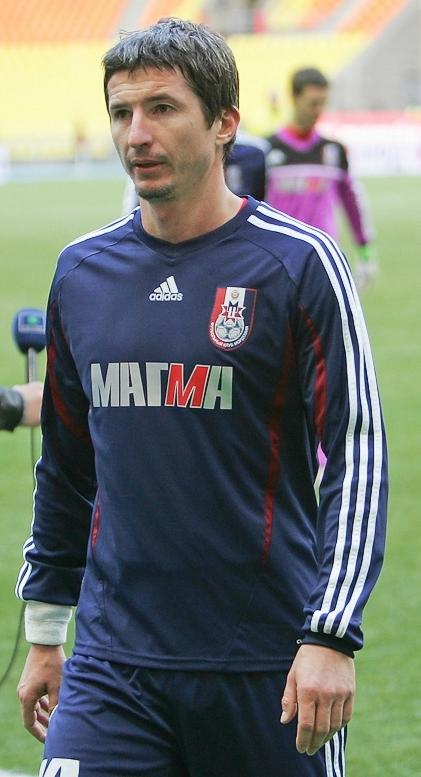
- Aldonin with Mordovia in 2012

Personal information
- Full name: Evgeni Valerievich Aldonin
- Date of birth: 22 January 1980 (age 46)
- Place of birth: Alupka, Crimean Oblast, Ukrainian SSR, USSR
- Height: 1.79 m (5 ft 10 1/2 in)
- Position: Midfielder

Youth career
- –1996: DYuSSh Alupka
- 1996–2000: Rotor Volgograd

Senior career*
Years	Team	Apps	(Gls)
1997–2000	Rotor-2 Volgograd	92	(15)
1999–2003	Rotor Volgograd	99	(7)
2004–2013	CSKA Moscow	213	(6)
2012–2013	→ Mordovia Saransk (loan)	21	(0)
2013–2014	Volga Nizhny Novgorod	17	(0)
2017–2018	Zorkiy Krasnogorsk	22	(1)

International career
2002–2007	Russia	29	(0)

Managerial career
- 2020–2021: Torpedo Moscow (assistant)
- 2021–2022: Rotor Volgograd (assistant)
- * Club domestic league appearances and goals

Evgeni Valerievich Aldonin (Russian: Евгений Валерьевич Алдонин; born 22 January 1980) is a former professional footballer who played as a central midfielder and is best known for his time with CSKA Moscow. Born in Ukraine during the Soviet era, he became a citizen of Russia and played for the Russian national team.

== Career ==
Aldonin began to play youth football in his native town of Alupka before moving to FC Rotor's academy in Volgograd at the age of 16. From 1996 to 2000, he switched between playing for various youth teams and senior reserves, before making his first team debut on 30 April 2000 in the Russian Premier League game against Krylya Sovetov.

After three more seasons with the club, Aldonin moved to CSKA Moscow in early 2004. In his debut game for CSKA, he had won his first career trophy, the 2004 Russian Super Cup, in which he played for 120 minutes against fierce cross-city rivals Spartak Moscow. After his debut, he had quickly secured his place in the team's starting XI, playing mostly as a right-sided central midfielder in the 3–4–3 formation, and would remain an important first team figure for the next eight years until his departure from CSKA at the conclusion of the 2011–12 season. From 2004 to 2012, he had won a total of 11 trophies with CSKA Moscow, including the 2004–05 UEFA Cup and the 2008–09 Russian Cup, where he scored the 91-minute winning goal in the final.

Aldonin regularly played for Russia's national team from 2002 to 2007, and was in the squad for the UEFA Euro 2004, where he made two appearances before the team's elimination at the group stage. In 2006, following Guus Hiddink's appointment as manager, Aldonin had been made captain, although briefly. After just four games played under Hiddink as manager, he was benched in favor of other midfield options, and later stopped receiving call-ups by the summer of 2007.

== Personal life ==
Aldonin was born in Crimea, part of Soviet Ukraine at the time. In 1996, aged 16, he moved to Russia, where he would apply for and receive Russian citizenship by the age of 18.

Aldonin is the father of three children. From 2006 to 2011, he was married to a Russian pop singer Yulia Nachalova, with whom she has a daughter born in 2006. Following his ex-wife's death in 2019, he was given full custody of their daughter. In 2014, he married Olga, with whom he has a son and a daughter born in 2016 and 2019, respectively.

After his retirement as a professional footballer, Aldonin was introduced to padel by former teammate Rolan Gusev and became an avid player.

In 2024, Aldonin was diagnosed with cancer, reported as either stomach cancer or pancreatic cancer. In November 2025, he went public with the diagnosis as his condition had worsened despite surgeries, chemotherapy, and rehabilitation efforts in Germany. In July 2026, he returned to Moscow to spend time with his family while under the supervision of Russian oncologists. In September 2026, he proceeded to continue treatment in the United States.

== Career statistics ==
Club	Season	League			Cup		Continental		Other		Total	
Club	Season	Division	Apps	Goals	Apps	Goals	Apps	Goals	Apps	Goals	Apps	Goals
Rotor-d Volgograd	1997	Russian Third League	9	1	–		–		–		9	1
Rotor-d Volgograd	1998	Russian Second League	35	5	–		–		–		35	5
Rotor-d Volgograd	1999	Russian Second League	34	6	–		–		–		34	6
Rotor-d Volgograd	2000	Russian Second League	14	3	–		–		–		14	3
Rotor-d Volgograd	Total		92	15	0	0	0	0	0	0	92	15
Rotor Volgograd	1999	Russian Premier League	0	0	0	0	–		–		0	0
Rotor Volgograd	2000	Russian Premier League	12	0	0	0	–		–		12	0
Rotor Volgograd	2001	Russian Premier League	29	1	1	0	–		–		30	1
Rotor Volgograd	2002	Russian Premier League	29	4	1	0	–		–		30	4
Rotor Volgograd	2003	Russian Premier League	29	2	1	0	–		0	0	30	2
Rotor Volgograd	Total		99	7	3	0	0	0	0	0	102	7
CSKA Moscow	2004	Russian Premier League	30	0	2	0	9 (Note: Appearances in the UEFA Champions League)	0	1 (Note: Appearances in the Russian Super Cup)	0	42	0
CSKA Moscow	2005	Russian Premier League	29	1	8	2	15 (Note: Fourteen appearances, one goal in the UEFA Cup, one appearance in the UEFA Super Cup)	1	–		52	4
CSKA Moscow	2006	Russian Premier League	28	0	6	2	8	0	1	0	43	2
CSKA Moscow	2007	Russian Premier League	27	2	4	0	7 (Note: Two appearances in the UEFA Cup, five appearances in the UEFA Champions League)	0	1	0	39	2
CSKA Moscow	2008	Russian Premier League	25	3	4	0	5 (Note: Appearances in the UEFA Cup)	0	–		34	3
CSKA Moscow	2009	Russian Premier League	28	0	3	1	6 (Note: Two appearances in the UEFA Cup, four appearances, one goal in the UEFA Champions League)	1	0	0	37	2
CSKA Moscow	2010	Russian Premier League	14	0	1	0	6 (Note: Three appearances in the UEFA Champions League, three appearances in the UEFA Europa League)	0	0	0	21	0
CSKA Moscow	2011–12	Russian Premier League	32	0	3	0	11 (Note: Three appearances in the UEFA Europa League, eight appearances in the UEFA Champions League)	0	1	0	47	0
CSKA Moscow	Total		213	6	31	5	67	2	4	0	315	13
Mordovia Saransk (loan)	2012–13	Russian Premier League	21	0	1	0	–		–		22	0
Volga Nizhny Novgorod	2013–14	Russian Premier League	17	0	0	0	–		–		17	0
Zorkiy Krasnogorsk	2017–18	Russian Second League	22	1	2	0	–		–		24	1
Career total			464	29	37	5	67	2	4	0	572	36

== Honours ==
CSKA Moscow

- Russian Premier League: 2005, 2006
- Russian Cup: 2004–05, 2005–06, 2007–08, 2008–09, 2010–11
- Russian Super Cup: 2004, 2006, 2007
- UEFA Cup: 2004–05
