= Sergei Gorelov =

Russian footballer

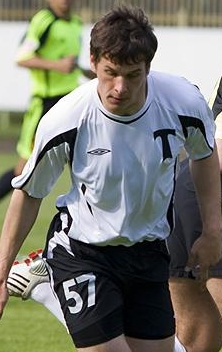
- Gorelov with Torpedo in 2008

Personal information
- Full name: Sergei Nikolayevich Gorelov
- Date of birth: 29 April 1985 (age 41)
- Place of birth: Moscow, Russian SFSR
- Height: 1.86 m (6 ft 1 in)
- Position: Defender

Youth career
- 2001–2006: PFC CSKA Moscow

Senior career*
Years	Team	Apps	(Gls)
2006–2009	PFC CSKA Moscow	2	(0)
2008	→ FC Torpedo Moscow (loan)	20	(0)
2009	→ FC Istra (loan)	6	(0)
2009	FC Dynamo St. Petersburg	11	(2)
2010	FC Volga Tver	7	(0)

International career
2007	Russia U21	1	(0)
- * Club domestic league appearances and goals

Sergei Nikolayevich Gorelov (Russian: Серге́й Николаевич Горе́лов; born 29 April 1985) is a Russian former professional football player.

== Club career ==
He made his debut in the Russian Premier League in 2007 for PFC CSKA Moscow.

== Honours ==
- Russian Premier League bronze: 2007.
- Russian Cup winner: 2008 (played in the early stages of the 2007/08 tournament for CSKA).
