= 2006 Russian Cup final =

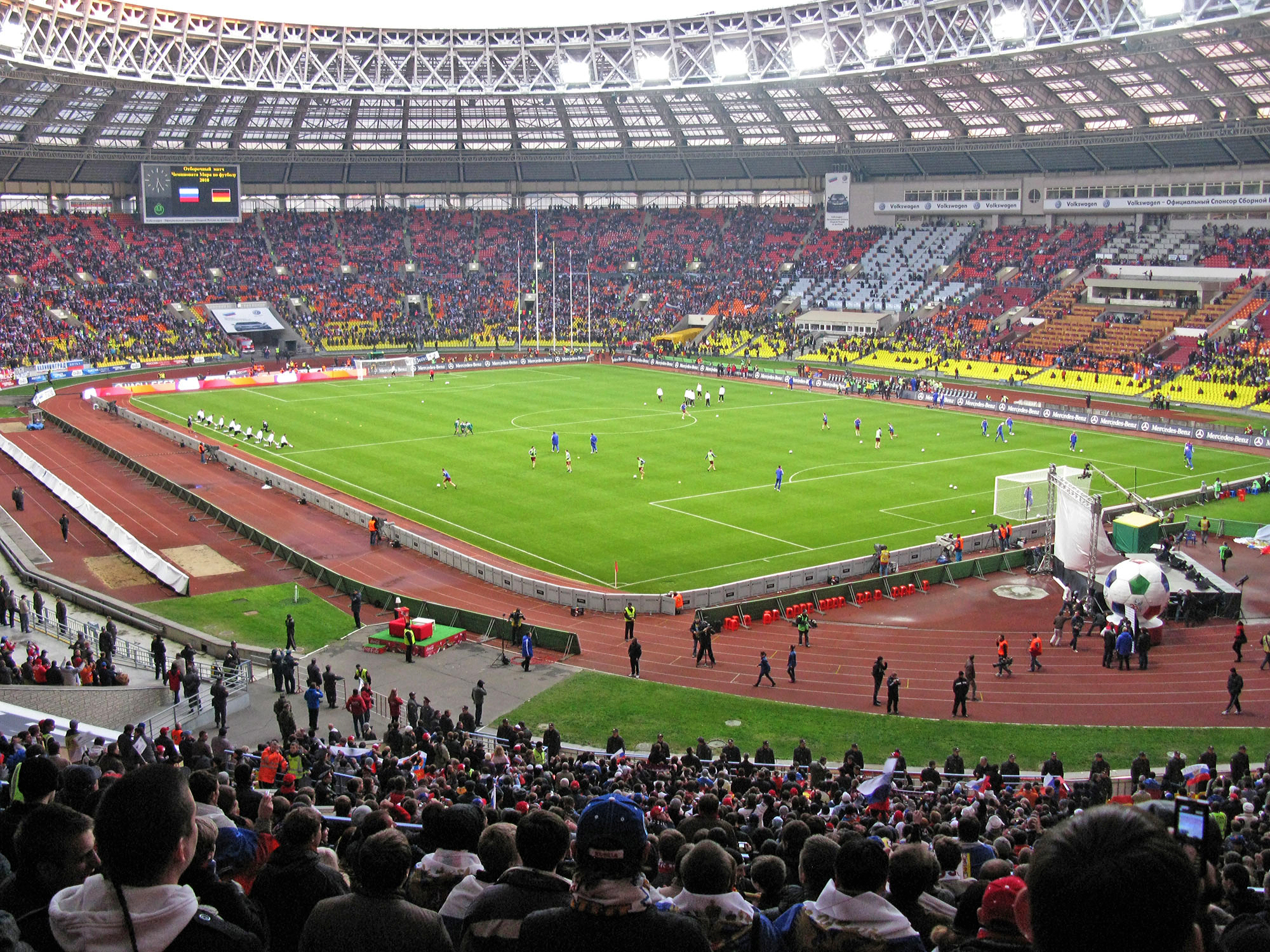
- Event: 2005–06 Russian Cup
CSKA Moscow	Spartak Moscow
3	0
- Date: 19 May 2006
- Venue: Luzhniki Stadium, Moscow
- Referee: Valentin Ivanov
- Attendance: 67,000

The 2006 Russian Cup final decided the winner of the 2005–06 Russian Cup, the 14th season of Russia's main football cup. It was played on 19 May 2006 at the Luzhniki Stadium in Moscow, between CSKA Moscow and Spartak Moscow. CSKA Moscow emerged victorious with a 3–0 win thanks to two goals from Jô and a strike from Vágner Love.

As winners, CSKA Moscow qualified for the group stage of the 2006–07 UEFA Cup and also earned a berth in the 2007 Russian Super Cup against Spartak Moscow on 3 March 2007.

== Match details ==
19 May 2006
16:00 UTC+3

CSKA Moscow	3–0	Spartak Moscow
Jô 43', 90+3'; Vágner Love 90'	Report

Luzhniki Stadium, Moscow
Attendance: 67,000
Referee: Valentin Ivanov (Moscow)

Match rules

- 90 minutes.
- 30 minutes of extra time if necessary.
- Penalty shoot-out if scores still level.
- Seven named substitutes, of which up to three may be used.
