= Andrei Govorov =

Russian footballer (born 1984)

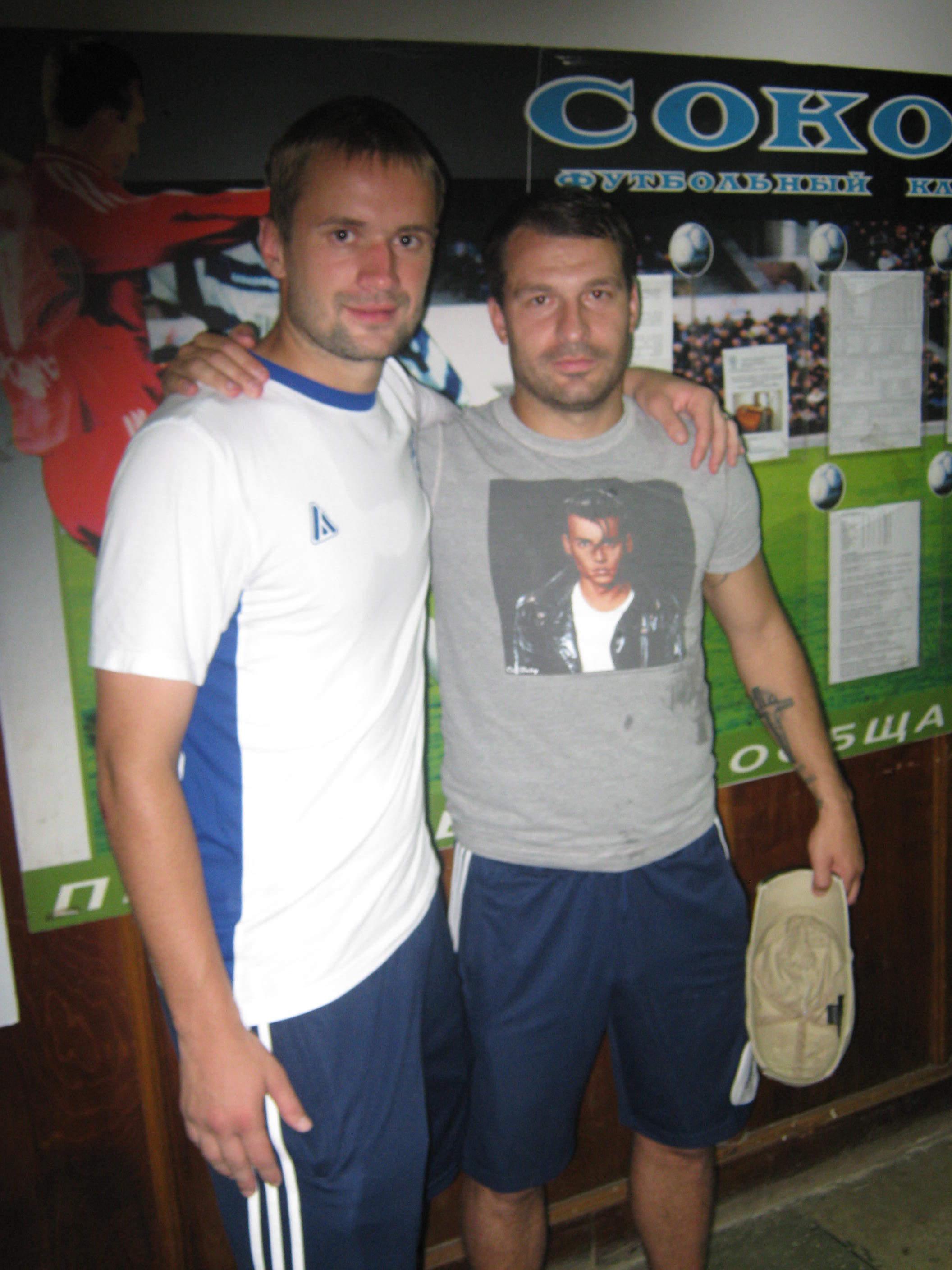
- Evgeni Shcherbakov with Govorov

Personal information
- Full name: Andrei Sergeyevich Govorov
- Date of birth: 13 October 1984 (age 42)
- Place of birth: Moscow, Russian SFSR
- Height: 1.75 m (5 ft 9 in)
- Position: Midfielder

Youth career
- PFC CSKA Moscow

Senior career*
Years	Team	Apps	(Gls)
2001	PFC CSKA Moscow	0	(0)
2002	FC Mostransgaz Gazoprovod	4	(1)
2002	FC Titan Reutov	16	(0)
2003	FC Uralan Plus Moscow	7	(0)
2004	FC Baltika Kaliningrad	12	(1)
2004	FC Presnya Moscow (amateur)		
2005	FC Khimki	13	(0)
2006	FC Presnya Moscow	8	(3)
2006	FC Baltika Kaliningrad	18	(5)
2007	FC Ural Sverdlovsk Oblast	33	(5)
2008	FC Zvezda Irkutsk	11	(1)
2008	FC Torpedo Moscow	15	(2)
2009	FC Nizhny Novgorod	32	(7)
2010	FC Shinnik Yaroslavl	36	(6)
2011–2012	FC Khimki	25	(4)
2012	FC Sokol Saratov	3	(0)
2012–2013	FC Dolgoprudny	27	(4)
- * Club domestic league appearances and goals

Andrei Sergeyevich Govorov (Russian: Андрей Серге́евич Говоров; born 13 October 1984) is a former Russian professional football player.

== Club career ==
He played eight seasons in the Russian Football National League for seven different clubs.

== Honours ==
- Russian Cup finalist: 2005.
