= 2022 Russian Super Cup =

Zenit Saint Petersburg	Spartak Moscow
4	0
- Date: 9 July 2022
- Venue: Gazprom Arena, Saint Petersburg
- Referee: Vladimir Moskalyov
- Attendance: 55,608
- Weather: Clear; stadium with rooftop closure capabilities

The 2022 Russian Super Cup (Rus. 2022 Российский Суперкубок) was the 20th edition of the Russian Super Cup, an annual football match organised jointly by the Russian Football Union and the Russian Premier League. It was contested by the reigning champions of the Russian Cup and the Russian Premier League. The match featured FC Spartak Moscow, the champions of the 2021–22 Russian Cup, and FC Zenit Saint Petersburg, the winners of the 2021–22 Russian Premier League. It was played at Gazprom Arena in Saint Petersburg, Russia and Zenit won 4:0, its third consecutive title of Russian Super Cup.

== Teams ==
Team	Qualification	Previous participations (bold indicates winners)
(Russia) Zenit Saint Petersburg	Winners of the 2021-22 Russian Premier League	9 (**2008**, **2011**, 2012, 2013, **2015**, **2016**, 2019, **2020**, **2021**)
(Russia) Spartak Moscow	Winners of the 2021-22 Russian Cup	4 (2004, 2006, 2007, **2017**)

== Venue ==
Gazprom Arena in Saint Petersburg was hosted the match.

The venue selected was controversial, as the venue is supposed to be neutral and Gazprom Arena is the home stadium of Zenit. Spartak considered boycotting the match in protest, but ultimately decided to attend.

== Match ==
=== Details ===
9 July 2022
19:00 MSK (UTC+3)

Zenit Saint Petersburg	4–0	Spartak Moscow
Sergeyev 29'; Malcom 34'; Wendel 47'; Cassiera 90+3'	Report

Gazprom Arena, Saint Petersburg
Attendance: 55,608
Referee: Vladimir Moskalyov (Voronezh)

GK	71	(Russia) Daniil Odoyevsky
DF	2	(Russia) Dmitri Chistyakov
DF	3	(Brazil) Douglas Santos (c)		(substituted off) 86'
DF	28	(Kazakhstan) Nuraly Alip
MF	19	(Russia) Aleksei Sutormin		(substituted off) 69'
MF	14	(Russia) Daler Kuzyaev
MF	5	(Colombia) Wilmar Barrios	(yellow card) 89'
MF	8	(Brazil) Wendel		(substituted off) 77'
MF	11	(Brazil) Claudinho
FW	33	(Russia) Ivan Sergeyev		(substituted off) 69'
FW	10	(Brazil) Malcom		(substituted off) 77'
Substitutes:
GK	41	(Russia) Mikhail Kerzhakov
GK	91	(Russia) David Byazrov
DF	4	(Russia) Danil Krugovoy		(substituted on) 77'
DF	23	(Russia) Arsen Adamov
DF	6	(Croatia) Dejan Lovren
DF	55	(Brazil) Rodrigão
MF	21	(Russia) Aleksandr Yerokhin		(substituted on) 86'
MF	7	(Russia) Zelimkhan Bakayev		(substituted on) 69'
MF	17	(Russia) Andrei Mostovoy		(substituted on) 77'
MF	64	(Russia) Kirill Kravtsov
FW	30	(Colombia) Mateo Cassierra		(substituted on) 69'
Manager:
(Russia) Sergei Semak

GK	57	(Russia) Aleksandr Selikhov
DF	23	(Russia) Nikita Chernov	(yellow card) 57'
DF	14	(Russia) Georgi Dzhikiya (c)
DF	13	(Poland) Maciej Rybus
MF	47	(Russia) Roman Zobnin		(substituted off) 76'
MF	22	(Russia) Mikhail Ignatov		(substituted off) 46'
MF	82	(Russia) Daniil Khlusevich		(substituted off) 60'
MF	18	(Russia) Nail Umyarov
MF	97	(Russia) Daniil Denisov
FW	10	(Netherlands) Quincy Promes
FW	7	(Russia) Aleksandr Sobolev		(substituted off) 60'
Substitutes:
GK	98	(Russia) Aleksandr Maksimenko
GK	95	(Russia) Mikhail Volkov
DF	92	(Russia) Nikolai Rasskazov		(substituted on) 76'
DF	39	(Russia) Pavel Maslov
DF	3	(Belgium) Maximiliano Caufriez
DF	5	(Russia) Leon Klassen
MF	17	(Russia) Anton Zinkovsky		(substituted on) 46'
MF	68	(Russia) Ruslan Litvinov		(substituted on) 60'
MF	25	(Russia) Danil Prutsev		(substituted on) 76'
FW	73	(Russia) Vladislav Shitov
FW	11	(Jamaica) Shamar Nicholson	(yellow card) 89'	(substituted on) 60'
Manager:
(Spain) Guille Abascal

Man of the Match: Malcom.

Assistant referees:
Valery Danchenko (Ufa)
Maksim Kovalyov (Reutov)
Fourth official:
Kirill Levnikov (St. Petersburg)
Inspector:
Aleksandr Safonov (Moscow)
VAR:
Sergei Karasev (Moscow)
AVAR:
Maksim Gavrilin (Vladimir)

**Match rules**

- 90 minutes
- No extra time
- Penalty shoot-out if scores still level
- Eleven named substitutes
- Maximum of five substitutions
