= 2014 Russian Super Cup =

Football match

The 2014 Russian Football Super Cup (Russian: Суперкубок России по футболу) was the 12th Russian Super Cup match, a football match which was contested between the 2013–14 Russian Premier League champion, CSKA Moscow, and the 2013–14 Russian Cup champion, Rostov.

The match was held on 26 July 2014 at the Kuban Stadium, in Krasnodar.

== Match details ==
26 July 2014
21:30 MSK (UTC+3)

CSKA Moscow	3–1	Rostov
Wernbloom 56'; Tošić 75'; Doumbia 80'	Report	Milić 37'

Kuban Stadium, Krasnodar
Attendance: 13,150
Referee: Alexey Nikolaev

CSKA	Rostov

GK	35	(Russia) Igor Akinfeev (c)
DF	2	(Brazil) Mário Fernandes
DF	4	(Russia) Sergei Ignashevich	(yellow card) 87'
DF	14	(Russia) Kirill Nababkin
DF	24	(Russia) Vasili Berezutski
MF	3	(Sweden) Pontus Wernbloom	(yellow card) 45+3'
MF	7	(Serbia) Zoran Tošić		(substituted off) 85'
MF	23	(Bulgaria) Georgi Milanov
FW	11	(Russia) Kirill Panchenko		(substituted off) 66'
FW	18	(Nigeria) Ahmed Musa		(substituted off) 83'
FW	88	(Ivory Coast) Seydou Doumbia
Substitutes:
GK	1	(Russia) Sergei Chepchugov
DF	6	(Russia) Aleksei Berezutski
MF	8	(Switzerland) Steven Zuber		(substituted in) 83'
MF	15	(Russia) Dmitri Yefremov		(substituted in) 85'
FW	31	(Brazil) Vitinho		(substituted in) 66'
FW	71	(Russia) Konstantin Bazelyuk
DF	91	(Russia) Nikita Chernov
Manager:
(Russia) Leonid Slutsky Assistant referees: Valery Danchenko; Igor Demeshko; Fourth official: Mikhail Erovenko

GK	1	(Croatia) Stipe Pletikosa (c)
DF	3	(Russia) Ruslan Abazov
DF	5	(Russia) Vitali Dyakov
DF	19	(Croatia) Hrvoje Milić
DF	77	(Angola) Bastos
MF	2	(Belarus) Timofei Kalachev	(yellow card) 21'
MF	4	(Russia) Dmitri Torbinski		(substituted off) 55'
MF	9	(Gabon) Guélor Kanga	(yellow card) 62' (yellow-red card) 63'
MF	84	(Moldova) Alexandru Gațcan	(yellow card) 53' (yellow-red card) 61'
FW	11	(Russia) Aleksandr Bukharov		(substituted off) 65'
FW	14	(Russia) Dmitry Poloz
Substitutes:
GK	35	(Russia) Soslan Dzhanayev
MF	7	(Russia) Georgy Gabulov		(substituted in) 65'
FW	10	(South Korea) Yoo Byung-Soo
MF	18	(Russia) Azim Fatullayev		(substituted in) 55'
DF	27	(Ivory Coast) Igor Lolo
DF	55	(South Africa) Siyanda Xulu
Manager:
(Montenegro) Miodrag Božović

== See also ==
- 2014–15 Russian Premier League
- 2014–15 Russian Cup
