= 2021 Russian Super Cup =

Zenit Saint Petersburg	Lokomotiv Moscow
3	0
- Date: 17 July 2021
- Venue: Kaliningrad Stadium, Kaliningrad
- Referee: Pavel Kukuyan
- Attendance: 16,388

The 2021 Russian Super Cup was the 19th edition of the Russian Super Cup, an annual football match organised jointly by the Russian Football Union and the Russian Premier League. It was contested by the reigning champions of the Russian Cup and the Russian Premier League. The match featured FC Lokomotiv Moscow, the champions of the 2020–21 Russian Cup, and FC Zenit Saint Petersburg, the winners of the 2020–21 Russian Premier League. It was played at Kaliningrad Stadium in Kaliningrad, Russia. Zenit won 3–0 with goals from Daler Kuzyayev, Sardar Azmoun and Aleksandr Yerokhin.

== Teams ==
Team	Qualification	Previous participations (bold indicates winners)
(Russia) Zenit Saint Petersburg	Winners of the 2020-21 Russian Premier League	8 (**2008**, **2011**, 2012, 2013, **2015**, **2016**, 2019, **2020**)
(Russia) Lokomotiv Moscow	Winners of the 2020-21 Russian Cup	8 (**2003**, **2005**, 2008, 2015, 2017, 2018, **2019**, 2020)

== Venue ==
Kaliningrad Stadium in Kaliningrad hosted the match. Capacity has been set to 70% in line with epidemiological restrictions.

== Match ==
=== Details ===
17 July 2021
18:00 KALT (UTC+2)

Zenit Saint Petersburg	3–0	Lokomotiv Moscow
Kuzyayev 27'; Azmoun 57'; Yerokhin 83'	Report

Kaliningrad Stadium, Kaliningrad
Attendance: 16,388
Referee: Pavel Kukuyan (Sochi)

GK	41	(Russia) Mikhail Kerzhakov (c)
DF	15	(Russia) Vyacheslav Karavayev
DF	2	(Russia) Dmitri Chistyakov
DF	44	(Ukraine) Yaroslav Rakitskiy		(substituted off) 86'
DF	3	(Brazil) Douglas Santos
MF	27	(Russia) Magomed Ozdoyev
MF	14	(Russia) Daler Kuzyaev		(substituted off) 82'
MF	8	(Brazil) Wendel		(substituted off) 61'
FW	7	(Iran) Sardar Azmoun		(substituted off) 60'
FW	10	(Brazil) Malcom
FW	11	(Argentina) Sebastián Driussi		(substituted off) 82'
Substitutes:
GK	91	(Russia) David Byazrov
GK	71	(Russia) Daniil Odoyevskiy
DF	4	(Russia) Danil Krugovoy
DF	6	(Croatia) Dejan Lovren		(substituted in) 86'
MF	64	(Russia) Kirill Kravtsov	(yellow card) 90+3'	(substituted in) 82'
MF	21	(Russia) Aleksandr Yerokhin		(substituted in) 82'
MF	17	(Russia) Andrei Mostovoy	(yellow card) 82'	(substituted in) 61'
MF	19	(Russia) Aleksei Sutormin
FW	99	(Russia) Daniil Kuznetsov
FW	22	(Russia) Artem Dzyuba		(substituted in) 60'
Manager:
(Russia) Sergei Semak

GK	1	(Russia) Guilherme (c)
DF	45	(Russia) Aleksandr Silyanov		(substituted off) 60'
DF	27	(Brazil) Murilo
DF	3	(Brazil) Pablo
DF	31	(Poland) Maciej Rybus
MF	69	(Russia) Daniil Kulikov
MF	6	(Russia) Dmitri Barinov	(yellow card) 51'	(substituted off) 81'
MF	7	(Poland) Grzegorz Krychowiak		(substituted off) 72'
MF	17	(Russia) Rifat Zhemaletdinov		(substituted off) 61'
FW	9	(Russia) Fyodor Smolov		(substituted off) 72'
FW	25	(Guinea) François Kamano
Substitutes:
GK	60	(Russia) Andrey Savin
GK	53	(Russia) Daniil Khudyakov
DF	2	(Russia) Dmitri Zhivoglyadov		(substituted in) 72'
DF	24	(Russia) Maksim Nenakhov
DF	74	(Russia) Artur Chyorny
DF	94	(Russia) Dmitry Rybchinskiy		(substituted in) 60'
MF	4	(Russia) Stanislav Magkeev
MF	11	(Russia) Anton Miranchuk		(substituted in) 61'
MF	90	(Belarus) Kirill Zinovich
MF	75	(Russia) Sergei Babkin		(substituted in) 81'
FW	88	(Belarus) Vitali Lisakovich		(substituted in) 72'
FW	80	(Russia) Timur Kasimov
Manager:
(Serbia) Marko Nikolić

Man of the Match:

Assistant referees:

**Match rules**

- 90 minutes
- 30 minutes of extra time if necessary
- Penalty shoot-out if scores still level
- Twelve named substitutes
- Maximum of five substitutions, with a sixth allowed in extra time
