= Berezutski =

Berezutskiy (Березуцкий in Russian) is a Russian surname.

It is the surname of the Russian football-playing identical twin brothers, who both played almost their entire career for CSKA Moscow:

- Aleksei Berezutskiy
- Vasili Berezutskiy
