= Daler Kuzyayev =

Russian footballer (born 1993)

Daler Kuzyaev
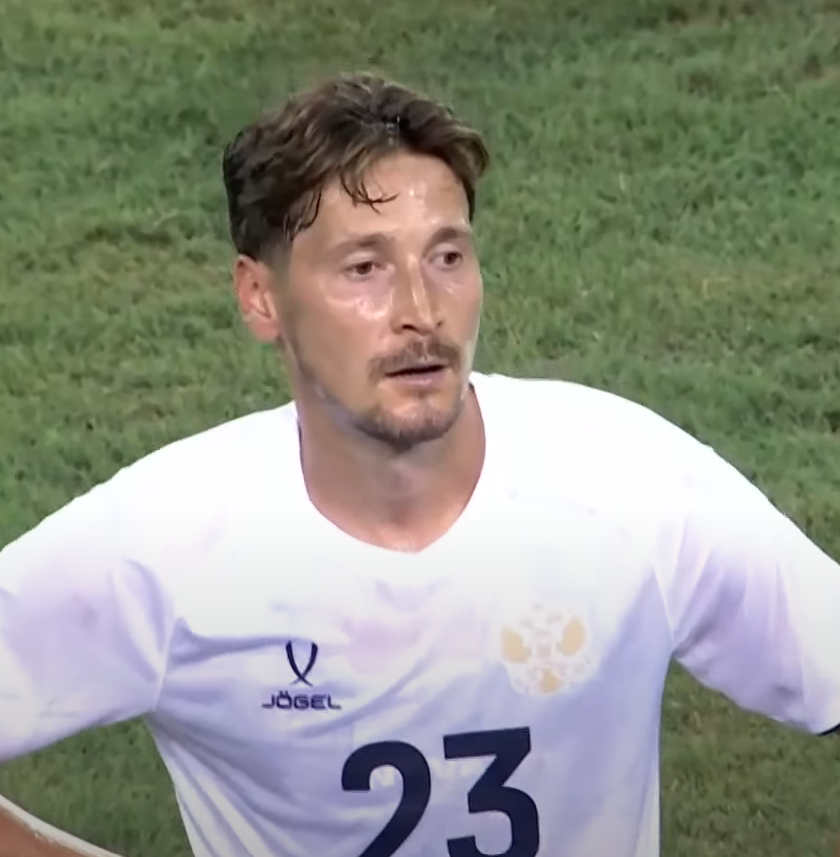
- Kuzyayev with Russia in 2024

Personal information
- Full name: Daler Adyamovich Kuzyaev
- Date of birth: 15 January 1993 (age 33)
- Place of birth: Naberezhnye Chelny, Tatarstan, Russia
- Height: 1.82 m (6 ft 0 in)
- Position: Midfielder

Team information
- Current team: Dynamo Makhachkala
- Number: 14

Youth career
- 2001–2004: Gazovik Orenburg
- 2004–2007: Kolomyagi Saint Petersburg
- 2007–2012: Zenit Saint Petersburg

Senior career*
Years	Team	Apps	(Gls)
2012–2013	Karelia Petrozavodsk	22	(0)
2013–2014	Neftekhimik Nizhnekamsk	15	(0)
2014–2017	Terek Grozny	70	(0)
2017–2023	Zenit Saint Petersburg	130	(16)
2023–2025	Le Havre	42	(3)
2025–2026	Rubin Kazan	16	(0)
2026–	Dynamo Makhachkala	6	(0)

International career^{‡}
2017–2024	Russia	51	(3)
- * Club domestic league appearances and goals as of 22 November 2026 ‡ National team caps and goals as of 5 September 2024

Dalyer Adyamovich Kuzyayev (Russian: Дале́р Адья́мович Кузя́ев, pronounced [dɐˈlʲer ɐˈdʲjaməvʲɪtɕ kʊˈzʲæ(j)ɪf]; Tatar: Дәлир Адәм улы Хуҗаев; born 15 January 1993) is a Russian professional footballer who plays as a central midfielder or a right midfielder for Dynamo Makhachkala.

== Club career ==
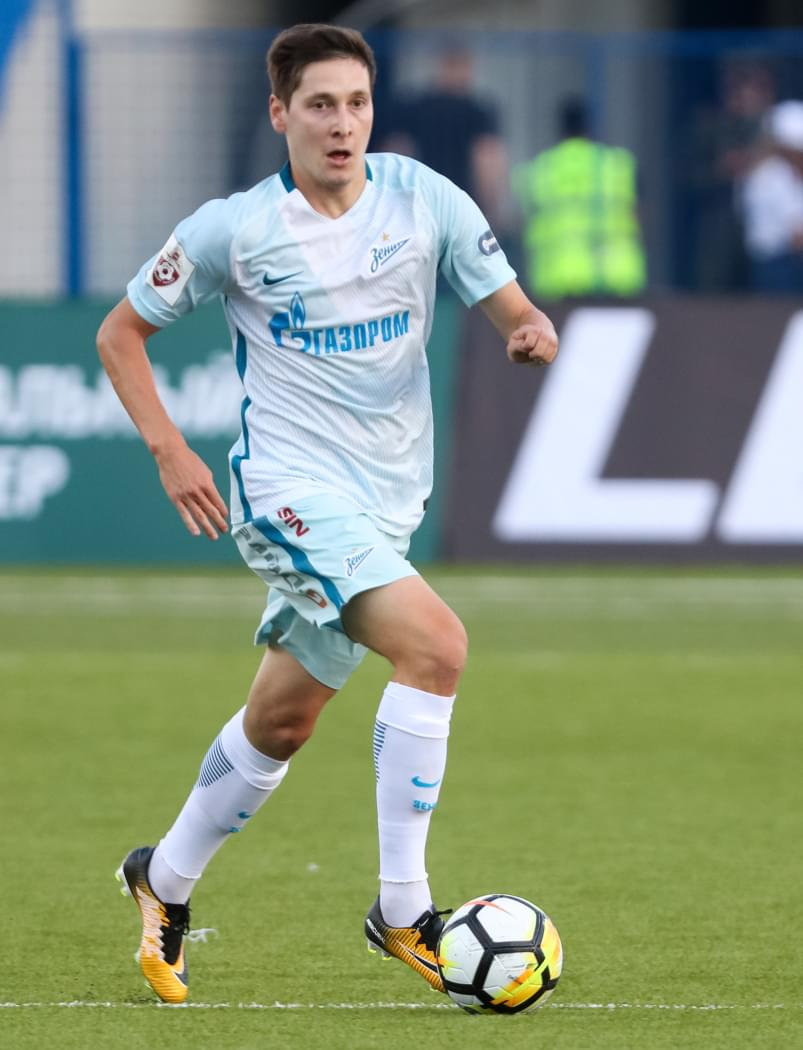
Kuzyayev in action for Zenit in 2017.

He made his debut in the Russian Second Division for Karelia Petrozavodsk on 23 July 2012 in a game against Spartak Kostroma.

He made his debut in the Russian Premier League for Terek Grozny on 15 May 2014 in a game against Rubin Kazan.

On 14 June 2017, he signed a three-year contract with Zenit Saint Petersburg. On his Zenit debut on 16 July 2017, he scored the first goal of his professional career, opening scoring in a game against SKA-Khabarovsk seven minutes after coming into the game as a half-time substitute.

His contract expired at the end of the 2019–20 season and he became a free agent and wanted to play abroad. After missing the 2020 Russian Super Cup and the first 10 games of the 2020–21 Russian Premier League, on 6 October 2020 he returned to Zenit and signed a new three-year contract.

On 12 July 2023, at the end of the games for Zenit, Kuzyayev signed a contract with the French Le Havre. The agreement was for two years. Kuzyayev left Le Havre on 17 June 2025.

On 24 September 2025, Kuzyayev returned to Russia and signed with Rubin Kazan until the end of the 2025–26 season. He left Rubin as his contract expired in June 2026.

On 25 September 2026, Kuzyayev signed with Dynamo Makhachkala for the 2026–27 season.

== International career ==
Kuzyayev made his debut for Russia national team on 7 October 2017 in a friendly game against South Korea.

On 11 May 2018, he was included in Russia's extended 2018 FIFA World Cup squad. On 3 June 2018, he was included in the finalized World Cup squad. He appeared as a second-half substitute in every group stage game, before starting both knock-out stage games - the Round of 16 defeat of Spain and the quarterfinal shoot-out loss to Croatia.

He scored his first national team goal on 19 November 2019 in a Euro 2020 qualifier against San Marino.

On 11 May 2021, he was included in the preliminary extended 30-man squad for UEFA Euro 2020. On 2 June 2021, he was included in the final squad. He started Russia's opening game against Belgium on 12 June 2021, but had to be substituted after colliding head-to-head with Timothy Castagne after 25 minutes of play (Castagne suffered double eye socket fracture in the collision and left the Euro 2020 due to that). He recovered for the second game against Finland on 16 June and played a full game in 1–0 victory. He started again on 21 June in the last group game against Denmark as Russia lost 1–4 and was eliminated, as Kuzyayev was substituted halfway through the second half.

== Personal life ==
Ethnically, Kuzyayev is a Tatar.

His older brother Ruslan is also a footballer, and his father Adyam is a coach and former player. His grandfather Kabir Kuzyayev played in the Soviet First League for Pamir Dushanbe in the 1960s.

== Career statistics ==
=== Club ===
As of match played 22 November 2026

Appearances and goals by club, season and competition
Club	Season	League			National cup (Note: Includes Russian Cup, Coupe de France)		Continental		Other		Total	
Club	Season	Division	Apps	Goals	Apps	Goals	Apps	Goals	Apps	Goals	Apps	Goals
Karelia Petrozavodsk	2012–13	Russian Second League	22	0	1	0	–		–		23	0
Neftekhimik Nizhnekamsk	2013–14	Russian First League	15	0	1	0	–		–		16	0
Terek Grozny	2013–14	Russian Premier League	1	0	0	0	–		–		1	0
Terek Grozny	2014–15	Russian Premier League	21	0	1	0	–		–		22	0
Terek Grozny	2015–16	Russian Premier League	21	0	3	0	–		–		24	0
Terek Grozny	2016–17	Russian Premier League	27	0	1	0	–		–		28	0
Terek Grozny	Total		70	0	5	0	–		–		75	0
Zenit Saint Petersburg	2017–18	Russian Premier League	26	6	1	0	9 (Note: Appearances in UEFA Europa League)	1	–		36	7
Zenit Saint Petersburg	2018–19	Russian Premier League	18	2	1	0	11	2	–		30	4
Zenit Saint Petersburg	2019–20	Russian Premier League	20	0	4	1	4 (Note: Appearances in UEFA Champions League)	0	–		28	1
Zenit Saint Petersburg	2020–21	Russian Premier League	18	3	1	1	6	0	–		25	4
Zenit Saint Petersburg	2021–22	Russian Premier League	22	0	1	0	5 (Note: Five appearances and one goal in UEFA Champions League, one appearance in UEFA Europa League)	1	1 (Note: Appearance in the Russian Super Cup)	1	29	2
Zenit Saint Petersburg	2022–23	Russian Premier League	26	5	8	0	–		1	0	35	5
Zenit Saint Petersburg	Total		130	16	16	2	35	4	2	1	183	23
Le Havre	2023–24	Ligue 1	30	2	3	1	–		–		33	3
Le Havre	2024–25	Ligue 1	12	1	1	0	–		–		13	1
Le Havre	Total		42	3	4	1	–		–		46	4
Rubin Kazan	2025–26	Russian Premier League	16	0	3	0	–		–		19	0
Dynamo Makhachkala	2026–27	Russian Premier League	6	0	1	0	–		–		7	0
Career total			301	19	31	3	35	4	2	1	369	27

=== International ===
As of match played 5 September 2024

Appearances and goals by national team and year
National team	Year	Apps	Goals
Russia	2017	4	0
Russia	2018	13	0
Russia	2019	4	1
Russia	2020	8	1
Russia	2021	13	0
Russia	2022	2	0
Russia	2023	5	0
Russia	2024	2	1
Total		51	3

Scores and results list Russia's goal tally first, score column indicates score after each Kuzyayev goal.

List of international goals scored by Daler Kuzyayev
No.	Date	Venue	Opponent	Score	Result	Competition
1	19 November 2019	San Marino Stadium, Serravalle, San Marino	San Marino	1–0	5–0	UEFA Euro 2020 qualification
2	15 November 2020	Şükrü Saracoğlu Stadium, Istanbul, Turkey	Turkey	2–3	2–3	2020–21 UEFA Nations League B
3	5 September 2024	Mỹ Đình National Stadium, Hanoi, Vietnam	Vietnam	1–0	3–0	2024 LPBank Cup

== Honours ==
Zenit Saint Petersburg

- Russian Premier League: 2018–19, 2019–20, 2020–21, 2021–22, 2022–23
- Russian Cup: 2019–20
- Russian Super Cup: 2021, 2022
