= Igor Smolnikov =

Russian footballer (born 1988)

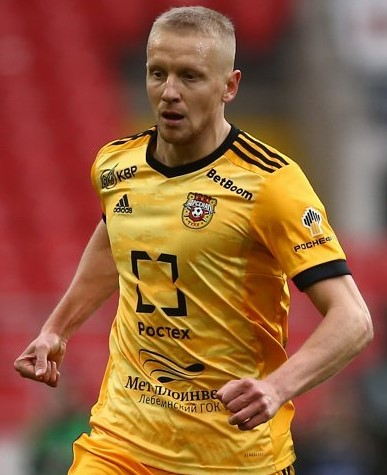
- Smolnikov with Arsenal Tula in 2022

Personal information
- Full name: Igor Aleksandrovich Smolnikov
- Date of birth: 8 August 1988 (age 38)
- Place of birth: Kamensk-Uralsky, Russian SFSR, Soviet Union
- Height: 1.78 m (5 ft 10 in)
- Position: Right-back

Team information
- Current team: Ural Yekaterinburg (scout)

Youth career
- 1995–1999: FC Udacha Kamensk-Uralsky
- 2000–2005: Lokomotiv Moscow

Senior career*
Years	Team	Apps	(Gls)
2006–2007	Torpedo Moscow	30	(2)
2008–2012	Lokomotiv Moscow	15	(0)
2009	→ Ural Sverdlovsk Oblast (loan)	12	(0)
2009	→ Chita (loan)	15	(2)
2011	→ Zhemchuzhina-Sochi (loan)	18	(1)
2011–2012	→ Rostov (loan)	23	(1)
2012–2013	Krasnodar	30	(0)
2013–2020	Zenit Saint Petersburg	143	(8)
2020–2021	Krasnodar	23	(0)
2021–2022	Arsenal Tula	27	(1)
2022	Torpedo Moscow	16	(1)
2023	Lokomotiv Moscow	6	(0)
Total		358	(16)

International career
2007	Russia U-19	3	(0)
2010	Russia U-21	1	(0)
2012	Russia-2	1	(0)
2013–2021	Russia	30	(0)

Managerial career
- 2024–2025: Ural Yekaterinburg (scout)
- * Club domestic league appearances and goals

Igor Aleksandrovich Smolnikov (Russian: Игорь Александрович Смольников; born 8 August 1988) is a Russian former football player who played as a right-back.

== Club career ==
On 29 July 2020, he returned to Krasnodar, signing a 2-year contract with a 1-year extension option. On 8 June 2021, his contract with Krasnodar was terminated by mutual consent.

On 23 July 2021, he joined Arsenal Tula.

On 8 February 2023, Smolnikov returned to Lokomotiv Moscow on a contract until the end of the 2022–23 season. Smolnikov left Lokomotiv in June 2023.

Smolnikov announced retirement from playing in August 2023.

== International career ==
Smolnikov was called up by Fabio Capello to the Russia squad for the first time on 4 October 2013 for the 2014 FIFA World Cup qualification matches against Luxembourg and Azerbaijan. He made his debut for the national team on 19 November 2013 in a friendly against South Korea.

On 11 May 2018, he was included in Russia's extended 2018 FIFA World Cup squad. On 3 June 2018, he was included in the finalized World Cup squad. He played his first and last World Cup game in the last group stage game against Uruguay on 25 June 2018 when he started the game, but was sent-off for two yellow cards in the 36th minute.

On 11 May 2021, he was named as a back-up player for Russia's UEFA Euro 2020 squad.

== Career statistics ==
=== Club ===
As of 27 November 2022

Club	Season	League			Cup		Continental		Other		Total	
Club	Season	Division	Apps	Goals	Apps	Goals	Apps	Goals	Apps	Goals	Apps	Goals
Torpedo Moscow	2006	RPL	4	0	0	0	–		–		4	0
Torpedo Moscow	2007	FNL	26	2	3	0	–		–		29	2
Lokomotiv Moscow	2008	RPL	1	0	1	0	–		–		2	0
Ural Yekaterinburg	2009	FNL	12	0	0	0	–		–		12	0
Chita	2009	FNL	15	2	0	0	–		–		15	2
Lokomotiv Moscow	2010	RPL	14	0	1	0	0	0	–		15	0
Lokomotiv Moscow	Total		15	0	2	0	0	0	0	0	17	0
Zhemchuzhina Sochi	2011–12	FNL	18	1	2	0	–		–		20	1
Rostov	2011–12	RPL	23	1	3	0	–		2 (Note: Appearances in the relegation play-offs)	0	28	1
Krasnodar	2012–13	RPL	26	0	1	0	–		–		27	0
Krasnodar	2013–14	RPL	4	0	0	0	–		–		4	0
Zenit St. Petersburg	2013–14	RPL	20	0	1	0	9	0	–		30	0
Zenit St. Petersburg	2014–15	RPL	23	4	0	0	12	0	–		35	4
Zenit St. Petersburg	2015–16	RPL	26	3	3	0	5	0	1 (Note: Appearance in the Russian Super Cup)	1	35	4
Zenit St. Petersburg	2016–17	RPL	17	0	0	0	2	0	1	0	20	0
Zenit St. Petersburg	2017–18	RPL	22	0	0	0	7	0	–		29	0
Zenit St. Petersburg	2018–19	RPL	23	1	0	0	9	0	–		32	1
Zenit St. Petersburg	2019–20	RPL	12	0	3	1	3	0	1	0	19	1
Zenit St. Petersburg	Total		143	8	7	1	47	0	3	1	200	10
Krasnodar	2020–21	RPL	23	0	1	0	8	0	–		32	0
Krasnodar	Total (2 spells)		53	0	2	0	8	0	0	0	63	0
Arsenal Tula	2021–22	RPL	27	1	0	0	–		–		27	1
Torpedo Moscow	2022–23	RPL	16	1	5	0	–		–		21	1
Torpedo Moscow	Total (2 spells)		46	3	8	0	0	0	0	0	54	3
Career total			352	16	24	1	55	0	5	1	436	18

=== International ===
Statistics accurate as of match played 14 October 2020.

Russia
Year	Apps	Goals
2013	1	0
2014	3	0
2015	6	0
2016	8	0
2017	5	0
2018	6	0
2020	1	0
Total	30	0

== Honours ==
Zenit Saint Petersburg

- Russian Premier League: 2014–15, 2018–19, 2019–20
- Russian Cup: 2015–16, 2019–20
- Russian Super Cup: 2015, 2016
