= Steven Zuber =

Swiss footballer (born 1991)

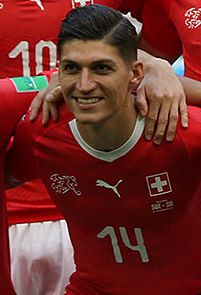
- Zuber with Switzerland at the 2018 FIFA World Cup

Personal information
- Full name: Steven Zuber
- Date of birth: 17 August 1991 (age 35)
- Place of birth: Winterthur, Switzerland
- Height: 1.82 m (6 ft 0 in)
- Positions: Winger; attacking midfielder

Team information
- Current team: Atromitos
- Number: 7

Youth career
- 1997–1998: FC Wülflingen/Wiesendangen
- 1998–2001: FC Kollbrunn-Rikon
- 2001–2002: FC Turbenthal
- 2002–2006: Winterthur
- 2006–2008: Grasshopper

Senior career*
Years	Team	Apps	(Gls)
2008–2013	Grasshopper	127	(23)
2013–2014	CSKA Moscow	29	(1)
2014–2020	TSG Hoffenheim	96	(9)
2015–2016	→ TSG Hoffenheim II	3	(6)
2019	→ VfB Stuttgart (loan)	14	(5)
2020–2022	Eintracht Frankfurt	20	(0)
2021–2022	→ AEK Athens (loan)	35	(8)
2022–2024	AEK Athens	62	(16)
2024–2026	Zürich	38	(11)
2026–	Atromitos	24	(7)

International career^{‡}
2007–2008	Switzerland U17	9	(1)
2008–2009	Switzerland U19	9	(3)
2010–2012	Switzerland U21	18	(5)
2012	Switzerland Olympic	4	(0)
2017–2024	Switzerland	56	(11)
- * Club domestic league appearances and goals as of 20 October 2026 ‡ National team caps and goals as of 6 July 2024

Steven Zuber (born 17 August 1991) is a Swiss professional footballer who plays as a winger for Greek Super League club Atromitos and the Switzerland national team. He also represented Switzerland at several youth international levels.

== Early life ==
Steven Zuber was born on 17 August 1991 in Winterthur, Zürich, Switzerland to Walter and Susanne Zuber. He has five siblings: Melanie, Kevin, Severin, David, and Marvin. On 27 May 2015, he married his long-time girlfriend, Mirjana Vasović.

== Club career ==
=== Grasshopper ===
Zuber made his first-team debut for Grasshopper on 12 July 2008 in the Intertoto Cup second round, second leg match against KS Besa, where he came on as an 83rd-minute substitute. On 3 August, he made his first Swiss Super League appearance in a 1–1 draw with Vaduz.

=== CSKA Moscow ===
On 5 July 2013, Zuber signed a five-year contract with Russian Premier League champions CSKA Moscow. He made his debut on 13 July against Zenit St. Petersburg in the 2013 Russian Super Cup, which CSKA won 3–0. He made his league debut four days later against Ural.

=== Hoffenheim ===
On 14 August 2014, Zuber moved to 1899 Hoffenheim on a four-year deal. On 25 January 2017, he extended his contract until 2020.

=== VfB Stuttgart ===
On 9 January 2019, Zuber was loaned out to VfB Stuttgart until the end of the season.

=== Eintracht Frankfurt ===
On 4 August 2020, Zuber joined Bundesliga club Eintracht Frankfurt on a three-year contract, with Mijat Gaćinović going the other way as part of a swap deal.

=== AEK Athens ===
On 30 August 2021, he signed a contract with Super League Greece club AEK Athens for a season-long loan from Eintracht. The deal between the two clubs included a buy-out option in the region of €2 million, with Zuber signing a three-year contract, if AEK were to choose to exercise it.

On 6 May 2022, AEK activated the buy-out clause of the Swiss player and along with that, the three-year contract was signed. Zuber was a key figure in helping AEK win the Greek Super League title, scoring 8 goals in 28 matches.

=== Zürich ===
On 11 December 2024, Swiss Super League club Zürich announced the signing of Zuber on a contract until 2026, confirming his return to Switzerland after more than 11 years abroad. After just half a year in Zürich, his contract was extended by a further year on 4 May 2025. At this point, he had scored seven goals and supplied one assist in just 16 games. Despite spending only half the season with the club, the fans voted him their best player of the 2024–25 season.

On 1 January 2026, Zürich announced that his contract was dissolved as of the end of 2025.

== International career ==
A member of the 2007–08 Switzerland U-17 squad, he was named as a reserve for the UEFA U-17 Championship held in May 2008. Zuber was a member of the Switzerland national team that participated in the 2012 Summer Olympics in London. On 17 March 2017, he was called into camp for the Switzerland team. He was included in the national team's 23-man squad for the 2018 FIFA World Cup in Russia. He started the first 2 group games against Brazil and Serbia, scoring the tying goal in a 1–1 draw with Brazil in their first group match. He started their round of 16 match against Sweden as they lost 1-0 and fell out of the tournament. In May 2019, he played in 2019 UEFA Nations League Finals, where his team finished 4th.

Zuber was included in Switzerland's UEFA Euro 2020 squad. He played an important role in Switzerland's victory over France in the round of 16, providing an assist and winning a penalty. He also finished the tournament as the assist leader with 4. He missed the 2022 FIFA World Cup due to injury. Despite returning to full fitness, he played just one international game throughout 2023, coming on in the final 30 minutes against Andorra on 16 June 2023. He was selected for Switzerland's 38-man preliminary squad for the UEFA Euro 2024. During the preparation for the main tournament, he scored the opening goal from long distance in a friendly win against Estonia.

== Career statistics ==
=== Club ===
As of 15 May 2026

Appearances and goals by club, season and competition
Club	Season	League			National cup (Note: Includes Swiss Cup, Russian Cup, DFB-Pokal, Greek Cup)		Europe		Other		Total	
Club	Season	Division	Apps	Goals	Apps	Goals	Apps	Goals	Apps	Goals	Apps	Goals
Grasshopper	2008–09	Swiss Super League	10	0	1	0	5	1	—		16	1
Grasshopper	2009–10	Swiss Super League	20	5	0	0	—		—		20	5
Grasshopper	2010–11	Swiss Super League	34	4	3	6	2 (Note: Appearances in UEFA Europa League)	0	—		39	10
Grasshopper	2011–12	Swiss Super League	31	8	4	2	—		—		35	10
Grasshopper	2012–13	Swiss Super League	32	6	4	1	—		—		36	7
Grasshopper	Total	Swiss Super League	127	23	12	9	7	1	—		146	33
CSKA Moscow	2013–14	Russian Premier League	27	1	3	0	6 (Note: Appearances in UEFA Champions League)	0	1 (Note: Appearance in Russian Super Cup)	0	37	1
CSKA Moscow	2014–15	Russian Premier League	2	0	—		—		1	0	3	0
CSKA Moscow	Total		29	1	3	0	6	0	2	0	40	1
Hoffenheim	2014–15	Bundesliga	17	0	4	0	—		—		21	0
Hoffenheim	2015–16	Bundesliga	12	2	0	0	—		—		12	2
Hoffenheim	2016–17	Bundesliga	24	4	2	0	—		—		26	4
Hoffenheim	2017–18	Bundesliga	20	1	1	0	6 (Note: Two appearances in UEFA Champions League, four appearances in UEFA Europa League)	0	—		27	1
Hoffenheim	2018–19	Bundesliga	8	0	1	0	3	1	—		12	1
Hoffenheim	2019–20	Bundesliga	14	2	2	0	—		—		16	2
Hoffenheim	Total		95	9	10	0	9	1	—		114	10
Stuttgart (loan)	2018–19	Bundesliga	15	5	—		—		—		15	5
Eintracht Frankfurt	2020–21	Bundesliga	20	0	2	0	—		—		22	0
Eintracht Frankfurt	2021–22	Bundesliga	0	0	1	0	0	0	—		1	0
Eintracht Frankfurt	Total		20	0	3	0	0	0	—		23	0
AEK Athens (loan)	2021–22	Super League Greece	35	8	3	0	—		—		38	8
AEK Athens	2022–23	Super League Greece	28	8	6	0	—		—		34	8
AEK Athens	2023–24	Super League Greece	31	7	2	0	9 (Note: Four appearances and one goal in UEFA Champions League, five appearances in UEFA Europa League)	1	—		42	8
AEK Athens	2024–25	Super League Greece	3	1	1	0	1 (Note: Appearances in UEFA Conference League)	0	—		5	1
AEK Athens	Total		97	24	12	0	10	1	—		119	25
Zürich	2024–25	Swiss Super League	20	7	1	1	—		—		21	8
Zürich	2025–26	Swiss Super League	18	4	1	0	—		—		19	4
Zürich	Total		38	11	2	1	—		—		40	12
Atromitos	2025–26	Super League Greece	18	7	0	0	—		—		16	3
Career total			439	80	41	10	32	3	2	0	513	89

=== International ===
As of 6 July 2024

Appearances and goals by national team and year
National team	Year	Apps	Goals
Switzerland	2017	8	2
Switzerland	2018	13	3
Switzerland	2019	4	1
Switzerland	2020	7	0
Switzerland	2021	14	4
Switzerland	2022	5	0
Switzerland	2023	1	0
Switzerland	2024	4	1
Total		56	11

As of match played 6 July 2024
Switzerland score listed first, score column indicates score after each Zuber goal[

List of international goals scored by Steven Zuber
No.	Date	Venue	Opponent	Score	Result	Competition
1	7 October 2017	St. Jakob-Park, Basel, Switzerland	Hungary	3–0	5–2	2018 FIFA World Cup qualification
2	7 October 2017	St. Jakob-Park, Basel, Switzerland	Hungary	4–0	5–2	2018 FIFA World Cup qualification
3	27 March 2018	Swissporarena, Lucerne, Switzerland	Panama	4–0	6–0	Friendly
4	17 June 2018	Rostov Arena, Rostov-on-Don, Russia	Brazil	1–1	1–1	2018 FIFA World Cup
5	8 September 2018	Kybunpark, St. Gallen, Switzerland	Iceland	1–0	6–0	2018–19 UEFA Nations League A
6	23 March 2019	Boris Paichadze Dinamo Arena, Tbilisi, Georgia	Georgia	1–0	2–0	UEFA Euro 2020 qualification
7	25 March 2021	Vasil Levski National Stadium, Sofia, Bulgaria	Bulgaria	3–0	3–1	2022 FIFA World Cup qualification
8	30 May 2021	Kybunpark, St. Gallen, Switzerland	United States	2–1	2–1	Friendly
9	1 September 2021	St. Jakob-Park, Basel, Switzerland	Greece	1–0	2–1	Friendly
10	9 October 2021	Stade de Genève, Lancy, Switzerland	Northern Ireland	1–0	2–0	2022 FIFA World Cup qualification
11	4 June 2024	Swissporarena, Lucerne, Switzerland	Estonia	1–0	4–0	Friendly

== Honours ==
Grasshopper

- Swiss Cup: 2012–13

CSKA Moscow

- Russian Premier League: 2013–14
- Russian Super Cup: 2013, 2014

AEK Athens

- Super League Greece: 2022–23
- Greek Cup: 2022–23

Individual

- Swiss Cup Top scorer: 2010–11
- UEFA European Championship top assist provider: 2020
