= 2016 Russian Super Cup =

Football match

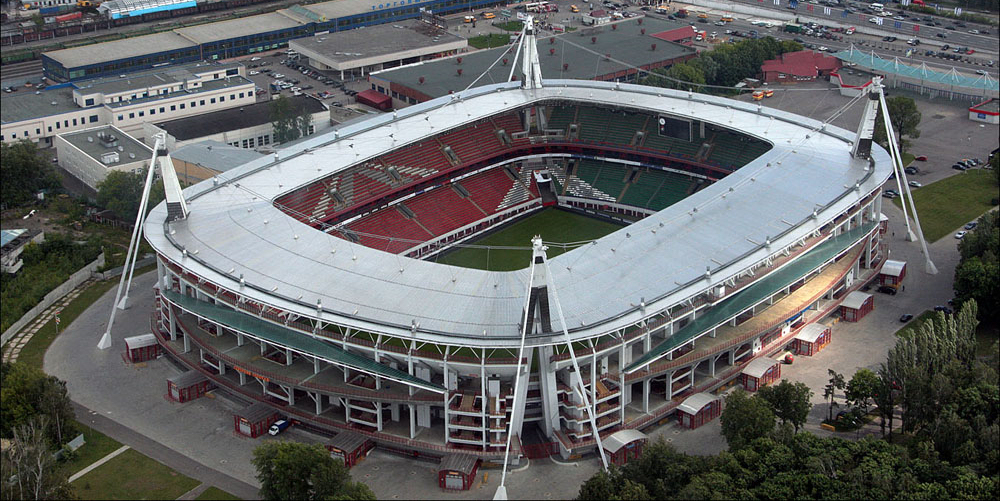
- Event: Russian Super Cup
| CSKA Moscow | Zenit Saint Petersburg |
| 0 | 1 |
- Date: 23 July 2016
- Venue: Lokomotiv Stadium, Moscow
- Referee: Sergei Karasev
- Attendance: 22,000

The 2016 Russian Football Super Cup was the 14th Russian Super Cup match, a football match which was contested between the 2015–16 Russian Premier League champion, CSKA Moscow, and the 2015–16 Russian Cup champion, Zenit Saint Petersburg.

The match was held on 23 July 2016 at the Lokomotiv Stadium, in Moscow.

== Match details ==
23 July 2016
19:00 MSK (UTC+3)

| CSKA Moscow | 0–1 | Zenit Saint Petersburg |
|---|---|---|
| | Report | Maurício 22' |

Lokomotiv Stadium, Moscow
Attendance: 22,000
Referee: Sergei Karasev (Moscow)

| CSKA | Zenit |

| GK | 35 | (Russia) Igor Akinfeev (c) |
| DF | 2 | (Brazil) Mário Fernandes |
| DF | 4 | (Russia) Sergei Ignashevich | (yellow card) 87' |
| DF | 6 | (Russia) Aleksei Berezutski |
| DF | 42 | (Russia) Georgi Schennikov |
| MF | 3 | (Sweden) Pontus Wernbloom | (yellow card) 62' |
| MF | 7 | (Serbia) Zoran Tošić | (yellow card) 62' | (substituted off) 61' |
| MF | 25 | (Finland) Roman Eremenko |
| FW | 66 | (Israel) Bibras Natcho | (yellow card) 61' |
| FW | 11 | (Russia) Aleksei Ionov | | (substituted off) 74' |
| FW | 9 | (Ivory Coast) Lacina Traoré | | (substituted off) 78' |
Substitutes:
| MF | 8 | (Bulgaria) Georgi Milanov | | (substituted in) 74' |
| MF | 17 | (Russia) Aleksandr Golovin | | (substituted in) 61' |
| FW | 23 | (Sweden) Carlos Strandberg | | (substituted in) 78' |
Manager:
(Russia) Leonid Slutsky Assistant referees: Fourth official:

| GK | 1 | (Russia) Yuri Lodigin | (yellow card) 76' |
| DF | 19 | (Russia) Igor Smolnikov |
| DF | 13 | (Portugal) Luís Neto |
| DF | 24 | (Argentina) Ezequiel Garay |
| DF | 4 | (Italy) Domenico Criscito | (yellow card) 93' |
| MF | 8 | (Brazil) Maurício | (yellow card) 62' |
| MF | 21 | (Spain) Javi García (c) |
| MF | 14 | (Russia) Artur Yusupov | | (substituted off) 80' |
| MF | 17 | (Russia) Oleg Shatov | (yellow card) 62' |
| FW | 9 | (Russia) Aleksandr Kokorin | (yellow card) 45' | (substituted off) 66' |
| FW | 22 | (Russia) Artyom Dzyuba | | (substituted off) 66' |
Substitutes:
| MF | 81 | (Russia) Yuri Zhirkov | | (substituted in) 66' |
| FW | 11 | (Russia) Aleksandr Kerzhakov | | (substituted in) 66' |
| FW | 77 | (Montenegro) Luka Djordjević | | (substituted in) 80' |
Manager:
(Romania) Mircea Lucescu

== See also ==
- 2016–17 Russian Premier League
- 2016–17 Russian Cup
