= Vladimir Bystrov =

Russian footballer (born 1984)

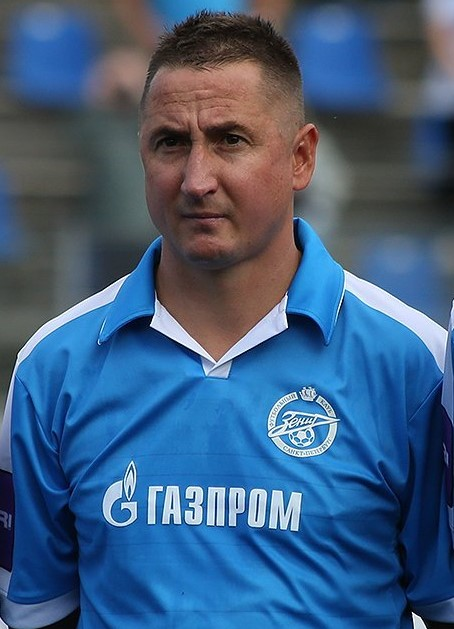
- Bystrov in 2022

Personal information
- Full name: Vladimir Sergeyevich Bystrov
- Date of birth: 31 January 1984 (age 42)
- Place of birth: Luga, Leningrad Oblast, Russian SFSR
- Height: 1.77 m (5 ft 10 in)
- Position: Winger

Senior career*
Years	Team	Apps	(Gls)
2001–2005	Zenit Saint Petersburg	61	(6)
2005–2009	Spartak Moscow	99	(17)
2009–2014	Zenit Saint Petersburg	85	(16)
2014	→ Anzhi Makhachkala (loan)	11	(1)
2014–2017	Krasnodar	40	(3)
2017–2018	Tosno	3	(0)

International career^{‡}
2003–2005	Russia U-21	4	(1)
2003	Russia-2	1	(0)
2004–2013	Russia	47	(4)

Managerial career
- 2019–2020: Russia U-19 (assistant)
- * Club domestic league appearances and goals as of 25 November 2017 ‡ National team caps and goals as of 11 October 2013

Vladimir Sergeyevich Bystrov (Russian: Владимир Серге́евич Быстров, born 31 January 1984) is a Russian former footballer who played as a right winger.

== Career ==
=== FC Zenit Saint Petersburg ===
Bystrov began his career with the youth club Smena. In 2001, he transferred to Zenit. On 8 May 2002, he made his debut in the Zenit squad. In 2005, he felt dissatisfied because he lost his place in squad and played less than he wanted. After a scandal with Zenith's hierarchy, he transferred to FC Spartak Moscow.

=== FC Spartak Moscow ===
In June 2005, he moved to Spartak for 4 million euro. Zenit fans were disappointed, because Spartak was their principal opponent. He made his debut for Spartak on 9 June. In 2009, he became a leader of Spartak with help of Alex and Welliton.

=== FC Zenit Saint Petersburg ===
On 27 August 2009, after four seasons with Zenit's archrivals Spartak Moscow, the winger suddenly returned to his former club, signing until June 2014.

In March 2010, Zenit was to be rewarded for finishing third in the Russian championship by the city of Saint Petersburg, but the ceremony ended with the players storming off the stage after Bystrov had been heckled by parts of the audience.

=== FC Krasnodar ===
After finishing his mid-season loan spell with newly relegated FC Anzhi Makhachkala, Bystrov joined FC Krasnodar on a three-year contract on 9 June 2014. Bystrov left Krasnodar at the end of his contract.

=== Tosno ===
On 8 August 2017, he signed a one-year contract with FC Tosno.

== International team ==
His first appearance for the Russia was in March 2004. Bystrov made a big impact in the seven Euro 2008 qualifiers he played in, with his two goals so important to the Russian cause. His displays have not gone unnoticed in the last couple of years and he has been linked with moves to both England's Premier League and Germany's Bundesliga. Bystrov was included in Guus Hiddink's Euro 2008 squad. He was a substitute in Russia's opening match, the 4–1 defeat to Spain, coming on for Dmitri Sychev in the 46th minute before being swapped for Roman Adamov in the 70th.

He was left out of Fabio Capello's Russian squad for the World Cup in Brazil. He was one of the seven provisional players not included in the final 23.

== Career statistics ==
=== Club ===
As of 13 May 2018

Club	Season	League		Cup		Europe		Other		Total	
Club	Season	Apps	Goals	Apps	Goals	Apps	Goals	Apps	Goals	Apps	Goals
Zenit	2002	8	0	2	0	2	0	—		12	0
Zenit	2003	19	4	5	2	—		4 (Note: Four appearances in the Russian Premier League Cup)	2	28	8
Zenit	2004	21	1	1	0	6	0	—		28	1
Zenit	2005	13	1	5	0	—		—		18	1
Zenit	Total	61	6	13	2	8	0	4	2	86	10
Spartak Moscow	2005	15	3	—		—		—		15	3
Spartak Moscow	2006	24	6	10	1	9	0	1 (Note: One appearance in the Russian Super Cup)	0	44	7
Spartak Moscow	2007	18	3	5	0	4	0	—		27	3
Spartak Moscow	2008	24	1	—		7	0	—		31	1
Spartak Moscow	2009	18	4	2	0	—		—		20	4
Spartak Moscow	Total	99	17	17	1	20	0	1	0	137	18
Zenit	2009	10	6	—		—		—		10	6
Zenit	2010	25	6	0	0	4	0	—		29	6
Zenit	2011–12	12	1	2	0	5	0	—		19	1
Zenit	2012–13	24	3	1	0	6	0	1 (Note: One appearance in the Russian Super Cup)	0	32	3
Zenit	2013–14	15	0	1	0	5	0	1 (Note: One appearance in the Russian Super Cup)	0	22	0
Zenit	Total	86	16	4	0	20	0	2	0	112	16
Anzhi Makhachkala	2013–14	11	1	0	0	0	0	—		11	1
Anzhi Makhachkala	Total	11	1	0	0	0	0	0	0	11	1
Krasnodar	2014–15	19	3	0	0	5	2	—		24	5
Krasnodar	2015–16	13	0	2	0	2	0	—		17	0
Krasnodar	2016–17	8	0	2	0	2	0	—		12	0
Krasnodar	Total	40	3	4	0	9	2	0	0	53	5
Tosno	2017–18	3	0	1	0	—		—		4	0
Career total		300	43	39	3	57	2	7	2	403	50

=== International goals ===
#	Date	Venue	Opponent	Score	Result	Competition
1	2006-11-15	Skopje City Stadium, Skopje, Republic of Macedonia	Macedonia	1 – 0	2–0	UEFA Euro 2008 qualifying
2	2007-02-08	Amsterdam Arena, Amsterdam, Netherlands	Netherlands	1 – 2	1–4	Friendly
3	2008-05-23	Lokomotiv Stadium (Moscow), Moscow, Russia	Kazakhstan	2 – 0	6–0	Friendly
4	2008-06-04	Wacker Arena, Burghausen, Germany	Lithuania	4 – 1	4–1	Friendly

== Career honours ==
=== Club ===
Zenit Saint Petersburg

- Russian Premier League: 2010, 2011–12
- Russian Cup: 2009–10
- Russian Super Cup: 2011
- Russian Premier League Cup: 2003

Tosno

- Russian Cup: 2017–18

=== International ===
Russia

- UEFA European Championship bronze medalist: 2008
