= Sergei Ignashevich =

Russian football manager (born 1979)

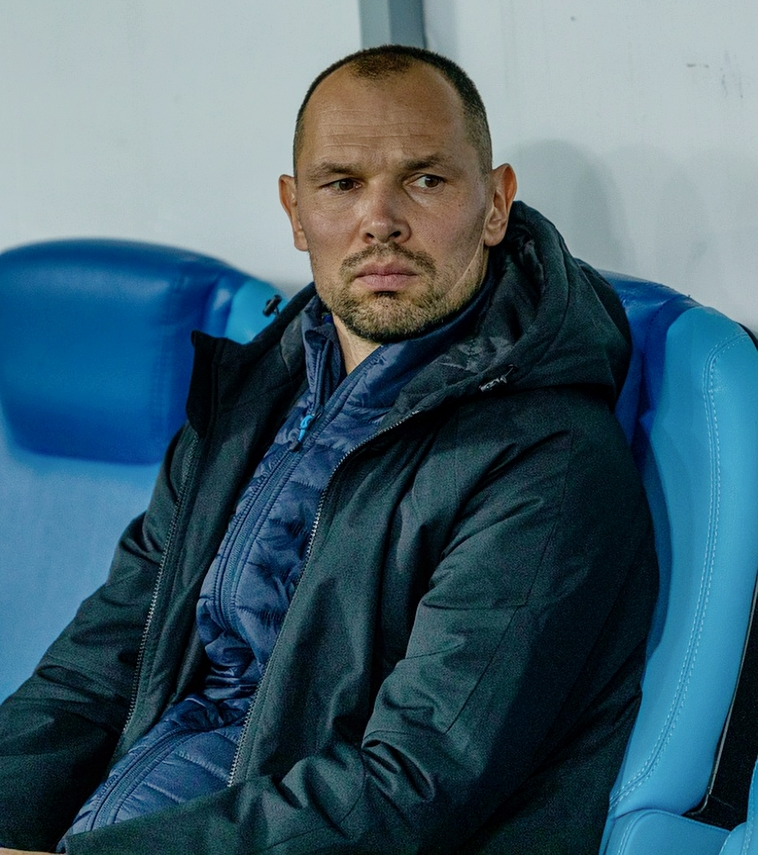
- Ignashevich in 2021

Personal information
- Full name: Sergei Nikolayevich Ignashevich
- Date of birth: 14 July 1979 (age 47)
- Place of birth: Moscow, Russian SFSR, Soviet Union
- Height: 1.86 m (6 ft 1 in)
- Position: Centre back

Youth career
- 1988–1997: Torpedo Moscow
- 1997: Spartak Moscow

Senior career*
Years	Team	Apps	(Gls)
1998–1999	Spartak Orekhovo	17	(1)
1999–2000	Krylia Sovetov Samara	31	(2)
2001–2003	Lokomotiv Moscow	76	(4)
2004–2018	CSKA Moscow	381	(35)
Total		505	(42)

International career
2000–2001	Russia U21	11	(0)
2002–2018	Russia	127	(8)

Managerial career
- 2018–2019: CSKA Moscow (U21 assistant)
- 2019–2020: Torpedo Moscow (senior coach)
- 2020–2021: Torpedo Moscow
- 2021–2024: Baltika Kaliningrad
- * Club domestic league appearances and goals

Sergei Nikolayevich Ignashevich (Russian: Сергей Николаевич Игнашевич, IPA: [sʲɪrˈɡʲej nʲɪkɐˈla(j)ɪvʲɪtɕ ɪɡnɐˈʂɛvʲɪtɕ]; born 14 July 1979) is a Russian professional football coach and a former player who played as central defender.

He began his career at Torpedo Moscow, going up through the club's academy before briefly moving to twin club Spartak Moscow's academy and then starting his professional career with Spartak Orekhovo.

He played for Lokomotiv Moscow and CSKA Moscow in his career, and has won Russian Premier League titles for both clubs, as well as the 2005 UEFA Cup Final with CSKA. Ignashevich is often considered one of the highest skilled defenders in the Russian Premier League while playing alongside fellow Russian international defenders and twin brothers Aleksei and Vasili Berezutskiy.

He made his international debut for Russia in 2002, and was selected in their squads for two European Championships and two FIFA World Cups, helping them to the semi-finals of UEFA Euro 2008, earning his 100th cap at the 2014 FIFA World Cup, and as part of the host team reached the quarter-finals of the 2018 FIFA World Cup. On 8 September 2015, he made his 110th international appearance and became the most capped player in Russia's team history, overtaking Viktor Onopko. On 17 November 2015, he made his 114th appearance, making him the most capped Russian player for any national team (again, overtaking Onopko who played 4 additional games for CIS).

On 2 April 2017, he played his 457th game in the Russian Premier League, setting a new record for most games played in the competition and overtaking the previous record holder Sergei Semak. He held the record for most games played in the Russian first tier with 489, until he was overtaken by his former teammate Igor Akinfeev on 21 August 2021.

== Club career ==
After short spells with Spartak Orekhovo and Krylia Sovetov, Ignashevich joined Lokomotiv Moscow in 2001. In his first season with the capital club, the defender was part of the team which won the Russian Cup. A year later, Lokomotiv won the Russian league title. Under manager Yuri Syomin, he usually played either as a defensive midfielder in front of the back-three or as a center back in the middle of the back-three. Due to his powerful shot, he also took penalties and free kicks, particularly from long distances.

In early 2004, Ignashevich left Lokomotiv for city rivals CSKA as a free agent. He immediately became a starter and played in the middle of a back-three, usually flanked by the Berezutski brothers, Aleksei on the left and Vasili on the right. In his fourteen years with the club, Ignashevich has won the 2005, 2006 and 2013 league titles, 2005, 2006, 2008, 2009 and 2013 Russian Cups, and the 2004–05 UEFA Cup.

Both Ignashevich and Aleksei Berezutskiy were provisionally suspended after both players' A samples revealed the presence of a prohibited substance following a random doping test after CSKA's UEFA Champions League match at Manchester United on 3 November 2009. It was later revealed that they had taken a cold medicine which had not been reported, and both players were suspended for one game, which was applied retroactively.

Following retirement after the 2018 World Cup, Ignashevich chose to remain with CSKA as a coach, specifically working within the youth set up at the club.

== International career ==
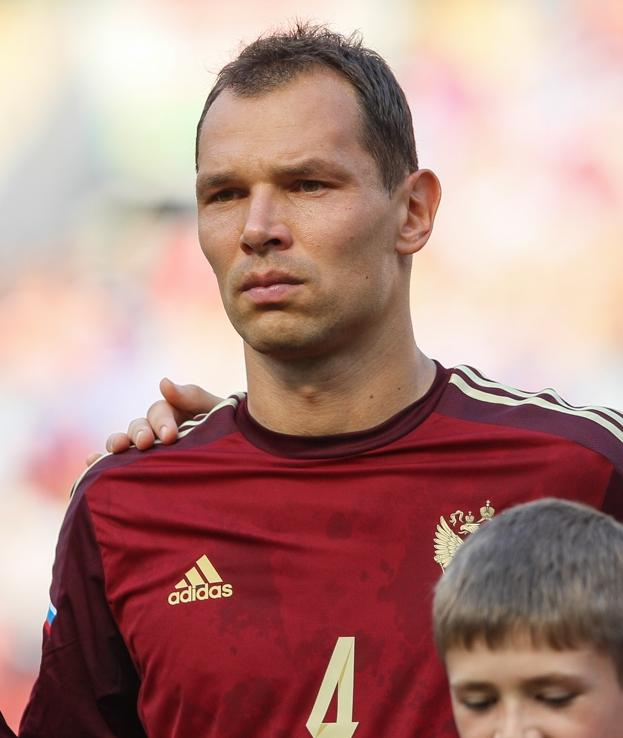
Ignashevich playing for Russia in 2014

Ignashevich made his debut for the Russia national football team against Sweden on 21 August 2002. He started all ten of the team's UEFA Euro 2004 qualifying matches, scoring three times, but missed the tournament finals in Portugal due to injury. He later appeared for Russia at the 2008 and 2012 UEFA European Championships, helping the team to the semi-finals in the former.

On 2 June 2014, Ignashevich was included in Russia's 2014 FIFA World Cup squad. On 16 June, he made his FIFA World Cup debut in the team's first group match against South Korea. He was then named in the starting line-up for the second match against Belgium at the Maracanã on 22 June. He became only the second Russian, after Viktor Onopko, to earn his 100th cap, in the final group game against Algeria on 26 June in Curitiba. Russia drew 1–1 and their opponents advanced at their expense.

Ignashevich came out of international retirement prior to the 2018 FIFA World Cup as he was called up on 14 May 2018 to replace injured Ruslan Kambolov. On 3 June 2018, he was included in the finalized World Cup squad. He was one of only four players born in the 1970s to feature in the tournament, with the others being Tim Cahill (Australia), Rafael Márquez (Mexico) and Essam El Hadary (Egypt). Against Spain in the Round of Sixteen, he scored an own-goal while tangling with Sergio Ramos during a corner set-piece, but Russia would equalize thanks to a penalty, and in the shoot-out Ignashevich converted his spot kick to help Russia advance. Following Russia's elimination in the 2018 FIFA World Cup quarterfinal against Croatia after extra time ended deadlocked 2–2, where he successfully converted a shoot-out kick, Ignashevich announced his retirement from all forms of football.

== Coaching career ==
After finishing his playing career, Ignashevich was appointed as administrator for the Under-21 squad of CSKA Moscow.

On 4 June 2019, he became the manager of Torpedo Moscow, a few days after the club was promoted to the Football National League. On 22 March 2021, he left Torpedo by mutual consent.

On 2 October 2021, he was appointed a manager of the Football National League club FC Baltika. On 19 May 2023, Baltika secured promotion to the Russian Premier League for the 2023–24 season, returning to the top tier after 25 years in the lower divisions.

In the 2023–24 season, Baltika finished 15th in the Premier League and was relegated after one season in the top tier. On the other hand, Baltika qualified for the 2023–24 Russian Cup superfinal where they faced Zenit St. Petersburg on 2 June 2024. After the final, in which Baltika lost 1–2 (Baltika opened the score and Zenit mounted a late comeback and scored twice), Ignashevich left Baltika.

== Personal life ==
Ignashevich is married and has three children. He is of Chuvash and Belarusian origin.

== Career statistics ==
=== Club ===
Appearances and goals by club, season and competition
Club	Season	League			National Cup		Continental^{1}		Other^{2}		Total	
Club	Season	Division	Apps	Goals	Apps	Goals	Apps	Goals	Apps	Goals	Apps	Goals
Znamya Truda	D2	1999	17	1	1	0	—		—		18	1
Krylya Sovetov	Russian Premier League	1999	6	1	1	0	—		—		7	1
Krylya Sovetov	Russian Premier League	2000	25	1	2	0	—		—		27	1
Krylya Sovetov	Total		31	2	3	0	0	0	-	-	34	2
Lokomotiv Moscow	Russian Premier League	2001	22	0	2	0	10	1	—		34	1
Lokomotiv Moscow	Russian Premier League	2002	29	1	0	0	10	2	—		39	3
Lokomotiv Moscow	Russian Premier League	2003	25	3	2	0	12	2	—		39	5
Lokomotiv Moscow	Total		76	4	4	0	32	5	-	-	112	9
CSKA Moscow	Russian Premier League	2004	22	1	2	0	7	0	1	0	32	1
CSKA Moscow	Russian Premier League	2005	22	5	6	0	15	2	1	0	44	7
CSKA Moscow	Russian Premier League	2006	26	2	6	1	6	0	1	0	39	3
CSKA Moscow	Russian Premier League	2007	26	3	5	1	7	0	1	0	39	4
CSKA Moscow	Russian Premier League	2008	28	4	2	1	6	0	-		36	5
CSKA Moscow	Russian Premier League	2009	29	3	4	0	9	0	-		42	3
CSKA Moscow	Russian Premier League	2010	28	2	1	0	10	1	1	0	40	3
CSKA Moscow	Russian Premier League	2011–12	38	5	4	2	12	1	1	0	55	8
CSKA Moscow	Russian Premier League	2012–13	28	0	3	0	2	0	-		33	0
CSKA Moscow	Russian Premier League	2013–14	30	2	1	0	6	0	1	1	38	3
CSKA Moscow	Russian Premier League	2014–15	30	0	2	0	6	0	1	0	39	0
CSKA Moscow	Russian Premier League	2015–16	25	3	3	0	10	1	-		38	4
CSKA Moscow	Russian Premier League	2016–17	24	4	0	0	4	0	1	0	29	4
CSKA Moscow	Russian Premier League	2017–18	25	1	0	0	11	0	-		36	1
CSKA Moscow	Total		381	35	39	6	111	5	9	0	540	46
Career total			505	42	47	6	143	10	9	0	705	58

^{1}Includes UEFA Europa League and UEFA Champions League.

^{2}Includes Russian Super Cup, Russian Premier League Cup and UEFA Super Cup.

=== International ===
Russia
Year	Apps	Goals
2002	4	0
2003	9	3
2004	4	0
2005	5	0
2006	6	0
2007	7	0
2008	11	0
2009	10	1
2010	7	0
2011	8	1
2012	13	0
2013	9	0
2014	13	2
2015	8	1
2016	6	0
2017	0	0
2018	7	0
Total	127	8

=== International goals ===
Scores and results list Russia's goal tally first.

No.	Date	Venue	Opponent	Score	Result	Competition
1	2003-06-07	St. Jakob-Park, Basel, Switzerland	Switzerland	1 – 2	2–2	UEFA Euro 2004 qualifying
2	2003-06-07	St. Jakob-Park, Basel, Switzerland	Switzerland	2 – 2	2–2	UEFA Euro 2004 qualifying
3	2003-09-06	Lansdowne Road, Dublin, Ireland	Republic of Ireland	1 – 1	1–1	UEFA Euro 2004 qualifying
4	2009-09-09	Millennium Stadium, Cardiff, Wales	Wales	2 – 1	3–1	2010 FIFA World Cup Qualifying
5	2011-10-11	Luzhniki Stadium, Moscow, Russia	Andorra	2 – 0	6–0	UEFA Euro 2012 qualifying
6	2014-09-03	Arena Khimki, Khimki, Russia	Azerbaijan	3 – 0	4–0	Friendly
7	2014-11-18	Groupama Arena, Budapest, Hungary	Hungary	1 – 0	2–1	Friendly
8	2015-10-09	Zimbru Stadium, Chișinău, Moldova	Moldova	1 – 0	2–1	UEFA Euro 2016 qualifying

=== Managerial statistics ===
As of 2 June 2024

Team	Nat	From	To	Record							
Team	Nat	From	To	M	W	D	L	GF	GA	GD	Win %
Torpedo Moscow	(Russia)	4 June 2019	22 March 2021	63	35	11	17	106	70	+36	55.56
Baltika Kaliningrad	(Russia)	2 October 2021	2 June 2024	105	44	27	34	167	125	+42	41.90
Total				168	79	38	51	273	195	+78	47.02

== Honours ==
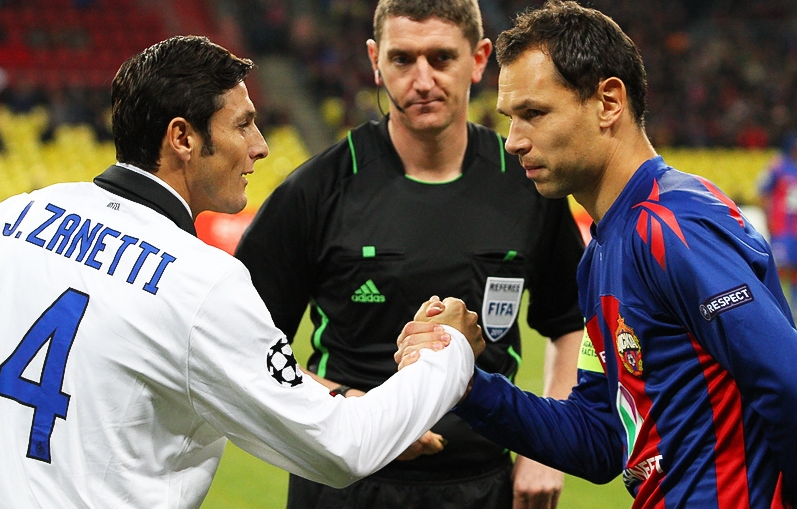
Ignashevich shaking hands with Javier Zanetti before a Champions League match against Internazionale in 2011

=== Club ===
Lokomotiv Moscow

- Russian Premier League: 2002
- Russian Cup: 2001
- Russian Super Cup: 2003

CSKA Moscow

- Russian Premier League: 2005, 2006, 2012–13, 2013–14, 2015–16
- Russian Cup: 2004–05, 2005–06, 2007–08, 2008–09, 2010–11, 2012–13
- Russian Super Cup: 2004, 2006, 2007, 2009, 2013, 2014
- UEFA Cup: 2004–05

=== International ===
Russia

- UEFA European Football Championship: 2008 bronze medalist

== See also ==
- List of men's footballers with 100 or more international caps
