= Pontus Wernbloom =

Swedish footballer (born 1986)

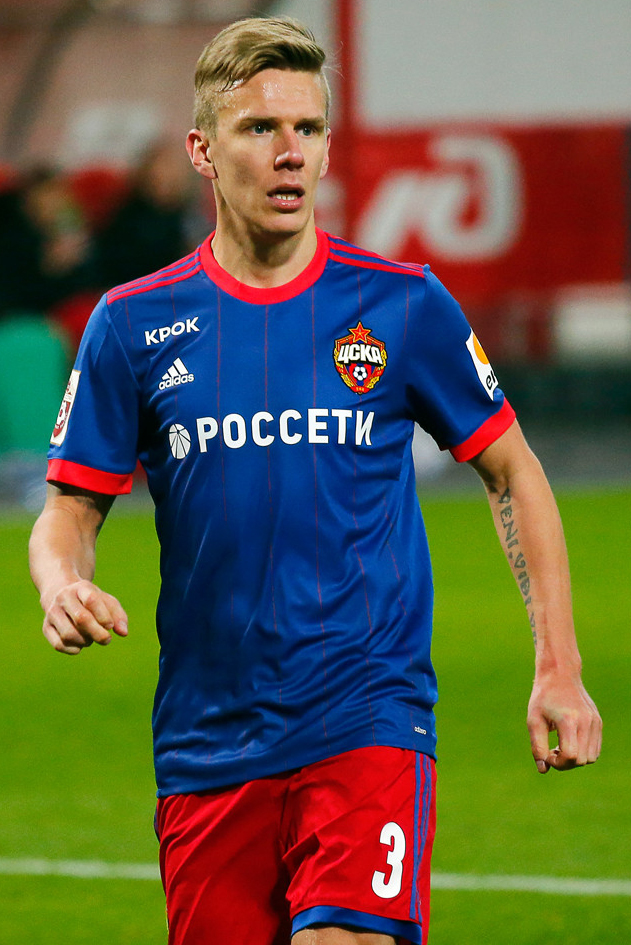
- Wernbloom playing for CSKA Moscow in 2017

Personal information
- Full name: Pontus Anders Mikael Wernbloom
- Date of birth: 25 June 1986 (age 40)
- Place of birth: Kungälv, Sweden
- Height: 1.87 m (6 ft 2 in)
- Position: Midfielder

Youth career
- 1993–2001: IK Kongahälla
- 2004–2005: IFK Göteborg

Senior career*
Years	Team	Apps	(Gls)
2001–2004	IK Kongahälla		
2005–2009	IFK Göteborg	92	(26)
2009–2012	AZ	67	(7)
2012–2018	CSKA Moscow	167	(17)
2018–2020	PAOK	11	(1)
2020–2021	IFK Göteborg	19	(2)
Total		356	(52)

International career
2006–2009	Sweden U21	24	(6)
2007–2016	Sweden	51	(2)
- * Club domestic league appearances and goals

Pontus Anders Mikael Wernbloom (Swedish pronunciation: [ˈpɔ̌nːtɵs ˈvæ̂ːɳblʊm]; born 25 June 1986) is a Swedish former professional footballer who played as a midfielder. Beginning his professional career with IFK Göteborg in 2005, he went on to represent AZ, CSKA Moscow, and PAOK before retiring at IFK Göteborg in 2021. A full international between 2007 and 2016, he won 51 caps for the Sweden national team and was a squad player at UEFA Euro 2012 and 2016.

== Club career ==
=== IFK Göteborg ===
After playing for local club IK Kongahälla, he joined the youth team of IFK Göteborg in 2004, before being promoted to the senior team in 2005. He quickly made a name for himself with his hard tackles, fighting spirit and generally fearless playing style. When Håkan Mild retired after the 2005 season, Wernbloom secured a place in the starting line-up. However, during the following season he struggled to retain his place as the club changed its playing style under new management. When striker Marcus Berg left to play for FC Groningen in the summer of 2007, Wernbloom switched to forward and was able to be a starter once again.

=== AZ ===
In April 2009, he signed a contract with Dutch club AZ. He made his Eredivisie debut against Heracles Almelo on 2 August 2009 and scored his first goal in a 3–3 draw away to VVV on 20 February 2010. Wernbloom scored a goal in both play-off round legs against Kazakh side FC Aktobe, helping his team to qualify for the group stage of the 2010–11 UEFA Europa League.

=== CSKA Moscow ===
In January 2012, Wernbloom left AZ for signing a long-term contract with the Russian top club CSKA Moscow. Plagued by injuries, Wernbloom was plunged into the deep end against a highly favored Real Madrid side in the knockout stages of the Champions League. In the game against his alleged favorite club, he scored a dramatic half-volley in the dying minutes to equalize 1–1.

After the final game of the 2017–18 season, CSKA Moscow announced that Wernbloom would be leaving the club at the end of his contract for family reasons.

Wernbloom left CSKA Moscow after a six-year spell with the Russian team.

=== PAOK ===
On 16 August 2018, Wernbloom arrived in Thessaloniki to agree on personal terms with Greek club PAOK. Eventually he signed a three–year contract worth €1.1 million per year. On 17 December 2018, Wernbloom was unlucky in the away game against Levadiakos, as he suffered a ruptured achilles tendon and would stay out of the action for several months, meaning PAOK would be without a key player as they look to win their first league title since 1985. On 20 August 2020, his contract with PAOK was terminated.

=== Return to IFK Göteborg and retirement ===
On 21 August 2020, Wernbloom signed a contract with IFK Göteborg until the end of the 2021 Allsvenskan season. He announced his immediate retirement from professional football on 14 July 2021, citing injury problems.

== International career ==
He debuted for the Sweden under-21 side in 2006, scoring a goal in the 12th minute of the match. He was picked for the Swedish national team's January tour in South America, and he made his debut on 18 January against Ecuador. He won his 50th cap for Sweden on 29 March 2016, a 1–1 draw with the Czech Republic. Pontus Wernbloom retired from international duty following UEFA Euro 2016. Wernbloom won 51 caps for Sweden, representing his country at UEFA Euro 2012 and 2016.

== Personal life ==
Wernbloom married girlfriend Nina in 2010 who gave birth to their son Mille the following year. He openly took a stance against Sweden Democrats prior to the 2010 Swedish general election, and stated his support for social democracy in Aftonbladet.

== Career statistics ==
=== Club ===
Appearances and goals by club, season and competition
Club	Season	League			Cup (Note: Includes Svenska Cupen, KNVB Cup and Russian Cup.)		Continental (Note: Includes UEFA Champions League and UEFA Europa League.)		Other (Note: Includes Svenska Supercupen, Johan Cruijff Shield and Russian Super Cup.)		Total	
Club	Season	Division	Apps	Goals	Apps	Goals	Apps	Goals	Apps	Goals	Apps	Goals
IFK Göteborg	2005	Allsvenskan	7	1			3	0	–		10	1
IFK Göteborg	2006	Allsvenskan	24	6			2	0	–		26	6
IFK Göteborg	2007	Allsvenskan	24	6			–		–		24	6
IFK Göteborg	2008	Allsvenskan	26	8			3	2	1	0	30	10
IFK Göteborg	2009	Allsvenskan	11	5	1	0	–		1	0	13	5
IFK Göteborg	Total		92	26	1	0	8	2	2	0	103	28
AZ	2009–10	Eredivisie	23	1	2	2	4	0	1	0	28	3
AZ	2010–11	Eredivisie	29	4	3	1	10	2	–		42	7
AZ	2011–12	Eredivisie	15	2	2	1	9	4	–		26	7
AZ	Total		67	7	7	4	23	6	1	0	98	17
CSKA Moscow	2011–12	Russian Premier League	11	0	0	0	2	1	–		13	1
CSKA Moscow	2012–13	Russian Premier League	26	4	4	0	2	0	–		32	4
CSKA Moscow	2013–14	Russian Premier League	28	1	1	0	6	0	1	0	36	1
CSKA Moscow	2014–15	Russian Premier League	25	2	4	1	2	0	1	1	32	4
CSKA Moscow	2015–16	Russian Premier League	27	4	4	0	10	0	–		41	4
CSKA Moscow	2016–17	Russian Premier League	27	1	0	0	5	0	1	0	33	1
CSKA Moscow	2017–18	Russian Premier League	23	5	0	0	14	3	–		37	8
CSKA Moscow	Total		167	17	13	1	41	4	3	1	224	23
PAOK	2018–19	Super League Greece	11	0	2	1	3	0	–		16	1
PAOK	2019–20	Super League Greece	0	0	0	0	0	0	–		0	0
PAOK	Total		11	0	2	1	3	0	0	0	16	1
IFK Göteborg	2020	Allsvenskan	13	2	3	1	1	0	–		17	3
IFK Göteborg	2021	Allsvenskan	6	0	–		–		–		6	0
IFK Göteborg	Total		19	2	3	1	1	0	0	0	23	3
Career total			356	52	26	7	76	12	6	1	464	72

=== International ===
Appearances and goals by national team and year
National team	Year	Apps	Goals
Sweden	2007	1	0
Sweden	2008	1	0
Sweden	2009	2	0
Sweden	2010	8	2
Sweden	2011	8	0
Sweden	2012	10	0
Sweden	2013	7	0
Sweden	2014	6	0
Sweden	2015	5	0
Sweden	2016	3	0
Total		51	2

Scores and results list Sweden's goal tally first, score column indicates score after each Wernbloom goal.

List of international goals scored by Pontus Wernbloom
No.	Date	Venue	Opponent	Score	Result	Competition	Ref.
1	3 September 2010	Råsunda Stadium, Solna, Sweden	Hungary	1–0	2–0	UEFA Euro 2012 qualifying	
2	3 September 2010	Råsunda Stadium, Solna, Sweden	Hungary	2–0	2–0	UEFA Euro 2012 qualifying	

== Honours ==
IFK Göteborg

- Allsvenskan: 2007
- Swedish Cup: 2008
- Swedish Super Cup: 2008

AZ Alkmaar

- Dutch Super Cup: 2009

CSKA Moscow

- Russian Premier League: 2012–13, 2013–14, 2015–16
- Russian Cup: 2012–13
- Russian Super Cup: 2013, 2014

PAOK

- Super League Greece: 2018–19
- Greek Cup: 2018–19

Sweden U21

- UEFA European Under-21 Championship bronze: 2009

Individual

- Swedish Midfielder of the Year: 2010
- Stor Grabb: 2012
