= Luís Neto =

Portuguese footballer (born 1988)

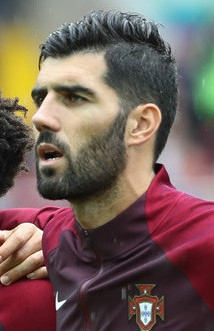
- Neto with Portugal at the 2017 Confederations Cup

Personal information
- Full name: Luís Carlos Novo Neto
- Date of birth: 26 May 1988 (age 38)
- Place of birth: Póvoa de Varzim, Portugal
- Height: 1.85 m (6 ft 1 in)
- Position: Centre-back

Team information
- Current team: Sporting CP (assistant)

Youth career
- 1998–2006: Varzim

Senior career*
Years	Team	Apps	(Gls)
2006–2011	Varzim	53	(2)
2011–2012	Nacional	25	(0)
2012–2013	Siena	20	(1)
2013–2019	Zenit St. Petersburg	118	(1)
2017–2018	→ Fenerbahçe (loan)	13	(0)
2019–2024	Sporting CP	68	(0)
Total		297	(4)

International career
2008	Portugal U20	4	(1)
2009	Portugal U21	4	(0)
2013–2018	Portugal	19	(0)

Managerial career
- 2024–: Sporting CP (assistant)
Medal record
Men's football
Representing Portugal
FIFA Confederations Cup
Third place	2017 Russia
- * Club domestic league appearances and goals

Luís Carlos Novo Neto (Portuguese pronunciation: [luˈiʒ ˈnɛtu]; born 26 May 1988) is a Portuguese former professional footballer who played as a centre-back.

== Club career ==
Born in Póvoa de Varzim, Porto District, Neto joined his hometown club Varzim SC's youth ranks at the age of 10. He appeared for them in the Segunda Liga, being a backup or third choice in four of his five seasons. His competitive debut came on 10 February 2007 in a 2–1 home win against S.L. Benfica in the sixth round of the Taça de Portugal, when he played two minutes.

In July 2011, Neto moved to Primeira Liga side C.D. Nacional on a free transfer. He immediately made an impact for his new team, and attracted interest from the likes of FC Porto and Arsenal during the following off-season; Italy's A.C. Siena eventually signed him for €1.7 million.

Neto was a starter during the first half of the campaign, scoring his only goal in Serie A in a 1–3 home defeat against AS Roma. On 1 February 2013 he moved again, joining compatriots Bruno Alves and Danny at FC Zenit Saint Petersburg. He scored his first goal for the Russian club on 19 May, his team's first in the 3–1 home victory over FC Volga Nizhny Novgorod.

On 31 August 2017, Neto signed for Fenerbahçe SK in a season-long move. On 11 March 2019, Sporting CP announced that he would join them on a permanent three-year contract on 1 July. He made 22 appearances in his second season (28 in all competitions), as the latter won the national championship for the first time in 19 years.

Neto scored his only goal for Sporting on 26 November 2023, opening an eventual 8–0 home rout of Campeonato de Portugal side Dumiense CJPII Futebol SAD in the fourth round of the domestic cup; this was also his first career one in ten years. He contributed seven games during the league campaign to win another title.

After retiring in 2024 aged 36, Neto remained at the club as an assistant manager to newly appointed João Pereira. Following the latter's dismissal, he retained his position under Rui Borges.

== International career ==
Neto appeared with the Portugal under-21 team at the 2009 Lusofonia Games. He played all four matches during the tournament, as they won the silver medal.

On 4 October 2012, Neto was called up for the first time to the full side, for 2014 FIFA World Cup qualifiers against Russia and Northern Ireland. He made his debut on 6 February of the following year, partnering Zenit teammate Alves in a 2–3 friendly loss to Ecuador in Guimarães.

On 19 May 2014, Neto was named in the final 23-man squad for the tournament in Brazil, but played no games in an eventual group-stage exit. He was also selected for the 2017 FIFA Confederations Cup by manager Fernando Santos. On 2 July, in his only appearance in the latter competition, he scored an own goal against Mexico in the third place play-off (a 2–1 win in Moscow).

Neto was included in a preliminary 35-man squad for the 2018 World Cup, but he did not make the final cut.

== Career statistics ==
Appearances and goals by club, season and competition
Club	Season	League			National cup (Note: Includes Taça de Portugal, Coppa Italia, Russian Cup, Turkish Cup)		League cup (Note: Includes Taça da Liga)		Europe		Other		Total	
Club	Season	Division	Apps	Goals	Apps	Goals	Apps	Goals	Apps	Goals	Apps	Goals	Apps	Goals
Varzim	2006–07	Liga de Honra	0	0	1	0	—		—		—		1	0
Varzim	2007–08	Liga de Honra	5	0	0	0	0	0	—		—		5	0
Varzim	2008–09	Liga de Honra	8	0	2	0	0	0	—		—		10	0
Varzim	2009–10	Liga de Honra	12	0	1	0	2	0	—		—		15	0
Varzim	2010–11	Liga de Honra	28	2	3	0	3	0	—		—		34	2
Varzim	Total		53	2	7	0	5	0	—		—		65	2
Nacional	2011–12	Primeira Liga	25	0	6	1	2	0	0	0	—		33	1
Siena	2012–13	Serie A	20	1	2	0	—		—		—		22	1
Zenit	2012–13	Russian Premier League	9	1	2	0	—		3 (Note: Appearances in UEFA Europa League)	0	—		14	1
Zenit	2013–14	Russian Premier League	25	0	2	0	—		7 (Note: Appearances in UEFA Champions League)	0	—		34	0
Zenit	2014–15	Russian Premier League	20	0	2	0	—		8 (Note: Two appearances in UEFA Champions League, six appearances in UEFA Europa League)	0	—		30	0
Zenit	2015–16	Russian Premier League	22	0	5	0	—		7	0	1 (Note: Appearance in Russian Super Cup)	0	35	0
Zenit	2016–17	Russian Premier League	25	0	2	0	—		7	0	1	0	35	0
Zenit	2017–18	Russian Premier League	4	0	0	0	—		2	0	—		6	0
Zenit	2018–19	Russian Premier League	13	0	2	0	—		6	0	—		21	0
Zenit	Total		118	1	15	0	—		40	0	2	0	175	1
Fenerbahçe (loan)	2017–18	Süper Lig	13	0	3	0	—		—		—		16	0
Sporting CP	2019–20	Primeira Liga	12	0	1	0	3	0	5	0	1 (Note: Appearance in Supertaça Cândido de Oliveira)	0	22	0
Sporting CP	2020–21	Primeira Liga	22	0	3	0	1	0	2	0	—		28	0
Sporting CP	2021–22	Primeira Liga	21	0	4	0	4	0	6	0	0	0	35	0
Sporting CP	2022–23	Primeira Liga	6	0	0	0	0	0	1	0	—		7	0
Sporting CP	2023–24	Primeira Liga	7	0	4	1	2	0	2	0	—		15	1
Sporting CP	Total		68	0	12	1	10	0	16	0	1	0	107	1
Career total			297	4	45	2	17	0	56	0	3	0	418	6

== Honours ==
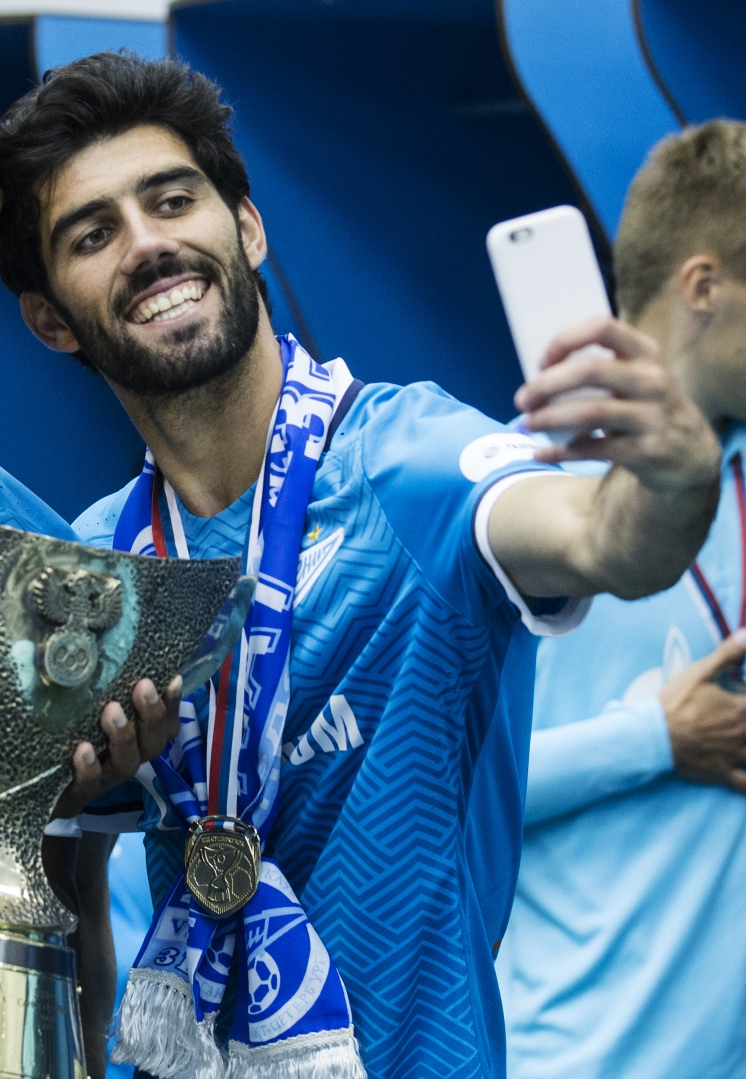
Neto takes a selfie with the trophy after winning the 2015 Russian Super Cup

Zenit St. Petersburg

- Russian Premier League: 2014–15, 2018–19
- Russian Cup: 2015–16
- Russian Super Cup: 2015, 2016

Sporting CP

- Primeira Liga: 2020–21 2023–24
- Taça da Liga: 2020–21, 2021–22
- Supertaça Cândido de Oliveira: 2021

Portugal

- FIFA Confederations Cup third place: 2017

Individual

- Segunda Liga Breakthrough Player of the Year: 2010–11
