= 2006 Russian Super Cup =

Football match

The 2006 Russian Super Cup was the 4th Russian Super Cup match, a football match which was to be contested between the 2005 Russian Premier League champion and the winner of 2004–05 Russian Cup. However, because the same team won both the league and the cup for the second consecutive season, the match was contested between the champion and the runner-up of the Russian Premier League, CSKA Moscow and Spartak Moscow, respectively. The match was held on 11 March 2006 at the Luzhniki Stadium in Moscow, Russia. CSKA Moscow beat Spartak Moscow 3–2 to win their second Russian Super Cup.

== Match details ==
11 March 2006
16:00 MSK

Spartak Moscow	2–3	CSKA Moscow
Titov 22'; Mozart 47'	Report	Zhirkov 42'; Odiah 73'; Jô 83'

Luzhniki, Moscow
Attendance: 43,000
Referee: Igor Egorov (Nizhny Novgorod)

Spartak Moscow:
GK	46	(Russia) Aleksei Zuev
DF	4	(Romania) Adrian Iencsi
DF	17	(Argentina) Clemente Rodríguez	(yellow card) 90' (yellow-red card) 90'
DF	20	(Lithuania) Ignas Dedura	(yellow card) 55'
MF	7	(Russia) Denis Boyarintsev
MF	9	(Russia) Yegor Titov (c)
MF	21	(Netherlands) Quincy Owusu-Abeyie
MF	23	(Russia) Vladimir Bystrov		(substituted off) 80'
MF	24	(Brazil) Mozart	(yellow card) 39' (yellow-red card) 90'
MF	27	(Moldova) Serghei Covalciuc		(substituted off) 86'
FW	10	(Russia) Roman Pavlyuchenko
Substitutes:
GK	1	(Russia) Dmitri Khomich
DF	35	(Russia) Sergei Kabanov
MF	8	(Russia) Dmitri Alenichev
MF	14	(Russia) Dmitri Torbinski
MF	25	(Ukraine) Maksym Kalynychenko		(substituted on) 80'
FW	18	(Serbia and Montenegro) Mihajlo Pjanović
MF	19	(Argentina) Fernando Cavenaghi		(substituted on) 86'
Manager:
(Latvia) Aleksandrs Starkovs Assistant referees: (Russia) Vladimir Yenyutin (Russia) Vladimir Bobyk; Fourth official: (Russia) Igor Zakharov

CSKA Moscow:
GK	35	(Russia) Igor Akinfeev
DF	4	(Russia) Sergei Ignashevich (c)	(yellow card) 90+'
DF	6	(Russia) Aleksei Berezutski	(yellow card) 40' (yellow-red card) 89'
DF	15	(Nigeria) Chidi Odiah	(yellow card) 90'
DF	24	(Russia) Vasili Berezutski
MF	10	(Brazil) Jô		(substituted off) 88'
MF	18	(Russia) Yuri Zhirkov
MF	22	(Russia) Evgeni Aldonin
MF	25	(Bosnia and Herzegovina) Elvir Rahimić	(yellow card) 45'
FW	7	(Brazil) Daniel Carvalho		(substituted off) 61'
FW	11	(Brazil) Vágner Love		(substituted off) 61'
Substitutes:
GK	77	(Russia) Vladimir Gabulov
DF	2	(Lithuania) Deividas Šemberas
MF	8	(Russia) Rolan Gusev
MF	17	(Serbia and Montenegro) Miloš Krasić		(substituted on) 61'
MF	20	(Brazil) Dudu Cearense		(substituted on) 88'
MF	37	(Russia) Kirill Kochubei
FW	9	(Croatia) Ivica Olić		(substituted on) 61'
Manager:
(Russia) Valery Gazzaev

== See also ==
- 2006 in Russian football
- 2005 Russian Premier League
- 2004–05 Russian Cup
