= 2004 Russian Super Cup =

2nd Russian Super Cup match

The 2004 Russian Super Cup was the 2nd Russian Super Cup match, a football match which was contested between the 2003 Russian Premier League champion, CSKA Moscow and the winner of 2002–03 Russian Cup, Spartak Moscow. The match was held on 7 March 2004 at the Lokomotiv Stadium in Moscow, Russia. CSKA Moscow beat Spartak Moscow 3–1 in extra time, after the normal time had finished in a 1–1 draw, to win their first Russian Super Cup.

== Match details ==
7 March 2004
16:00 MSK

Spartak Moscow	1–3 (a.e.t.)	CSKA Moscow
Kalynychenko 14'	Report	Semak 40'; Carvalho 111'; Kirichenko 113'

Lokomotiv, Moscow
Attendance: 18,000
Referee: Igor Egorov (Nizhny Novgorod)

Spartak Moscow:
GK	30	(Poland) Wojciech Kowalewski
DF	5	(Romania) Adrian Iencsi
DF	7	(Serbia and Montenegro) Dušan Petković	(yellow card) 43'
DF	18	(Ukraine) Dmytro Parfenov (c)
MF	6	(Serbia and Montenegro) Goran Trobok
MF	14	(Ukraine) Maksym Kalynychenko
MF	20	(Uruguay) Marcelo Sosa
MF	25	(Russia) Aleksandr Pavlenko		(substituted off) 77'
MF	31	(Romania) Gabriel Tamaş
FW	10	(Russia) Roman Pavlyuchenko
FW	40	(Russia) Aleksandr Samedov	(yellow card) 56'	(substituted off) 96'
Substitutes:
GK	16	(Georgia (country)) Giorgi Lomaia
DF	2	(Russia) Yuri Kovtun
MF	29	(North Macedonia) Igor Mitreski		(substituted on) 96'
MF	13	(Serbia and Montenegro) Srđan Stanić
MF	45	(Russia) Oleg Ivanov
MF	23	(Russia) Pavel Pogrebnyak		(substituted on) 77'
FW	28	(Serbia and Montenegro) Mihajlo Pjanović
Manager:
(Italy) Nevio Scala Assistant referees: (Russia) Yevgeni Volnin (Russia) Vladimir Bobyk; Fourth official: (Russia) Valeri Shaveiko

CSKA Moscow:
GK	35	(Russia) Igor Akinfeev
DF	2	(Lithuania) Deividas Šemberas
DF	4	(Russia) Sergei Ignashevich	(yellow card) 33'
DF	6	(Russia) Aleksei Berezutski
DF	28	(Ukraine) Bohdan Shershun
MF	5	(Russia) Sergei Semak (c)	(substituted on) 115'
MF	8	(Russia) Rolan Gusev	(substituted on) 84'
MF	18	(Russia) Yuri Zhirkov	(substituted on) 75'	(yellow card) 61'
MF	22	(Russia) Evgeni Aldonin
MF	25	(Bosnia and Herzegovina) Elvir Rahimić
FW	9	(Croatia) Ivica Olić		(substituted on) 108'	(yellow card) 52'
Substitutes:
GK	1	(Russia) Veniamin Mandrykin
DF	3	(Russia) Andrei Solomatin		(substituted on) 115'
DF	24	(Russia) Vasili Berezutski
MF	20	(Czech Republic) Jiří Jarošík		(substituted on) 108'
FW	7	(Brazil) Daniel Carvalho		(substituted on) 75'
FW	14	(Russia) Dmitri Kirichenko		(substituted on) 84'
FW	21	(Russia) Denis Popov
Manager:
(Portugal) Artur Jorge

== See also ==
- 2004 in Russian football
- 2003 Russian Premier League
- 2002–03 Russian Cup
