= 2013 Russian Super Cup =

The 2013 Russian Football Super Cup (Russian: Суперкубок России по футболу) was the 11th Russian Super Cup match, a football match which was contested between the 2012–13 Russian Premier League and 2012–13 Russian Cup champion CSKA Moscow, and the runner-up of the 2012–13 Russian Premier League, Zenit Saint Petersburg.

The match was held on 13 July 2013 at the Olimp-2, in Rostov.

== Match details ==
13 July 2013
21:30 MSK (UTC+3)

CSKA Moscow	3–0	Zenit Saint Petersburg
Honda 13', 83'; Ignashevich 36'	Report

Olimp-2, Rostov
Attendance: 15,200
Referee: Aleksandr Yegorov (Saransk)

CSKA	Zenit

GK	35	(Russia) Igor Akinfeev (c)
DF	4	(Russia) Sergei Ignashevich
DF	6	(Russia) Aleksei Berezutski
DF	24	(Russia) Vasili Berezutski
DF	42	(Russia) Georgi Schennikov	(substituted off) 73'
MF	3	(Sweden) Pontus Wernbloom
MF	7	(Japan) Keisuke Honda	(substituted off) 85'
MF	8	(Switzerland) Steven Zuber	(yellow card) 52'	(substituted off) 70'
MF	10	(Russia) Alan Dzagoev
MF	18	(Nigeria) Ahmed Musa
FW	9	(Brazil) Vágner Love
Substitutes:
GK	1	(Russia) Sergei Chepchugov
DF	5	(Russia) Viktor Vasin
DF	14	(Russia) Kirill Nababkin	(substituted on) 73'
MF	11	(Chile) Mark González
MF	15	(Russia) Dmitri Yefremov
MF	17	(Russia) Pavel Mamayev	(substituted on) 85'
MF	20	(Sweden) Rasmus Elm	(substituted on) 70'
FW	71	(Russia) Konstantin Bazelyuk
Manager:
(Russia) Leonid Slutsky Assistant referees: Igor Pisanko (Novosibirsk); Nikolai Bogach (Lyubertsy); Fourth official: Dmitri Bereznev (Rostov)

GK	1	(Greece) Yuri Lodygin
DF	13	(Portugal) Luís Neto	(yellow card) 35'
DF	13	(Slovakia) Tomáš Hubočan
DF	22	(Russia) Aleksandr Anyukov
DF	24	(Serbia) Aleksandar Luković	(substituted off) 42'
MF	10	(Portugal) Danny
MF	18	(Russia) Konstantin Zyryanov (c)	(substituted off) 79'
MF	28	(Belgium) Axel Witsel
MF	44	(Ukraine) Anatoliy Tymoshchuk
FW	11	(Russia) Aleksandr Kerzhakov
FW	23	(Russia) Andrey Arshavin	(substituted off) 56'
Substitutes:
GK	71	(Russia) Yegor Baburin
DF	6	(Belgium) Nicolas Lombaerts
DF	21	(Serbia) Milan Rodić
DF	57	(Russia) Dzhamaldin Khodzhaniyazov
MF	20	(Russia) Viktor Fayzulin	(substituted on) 56'
MF	34	(Russia) Vladimir Bystrov	(substituted on) 42'
MF	85	(Russia) Pavel Mogilevets
FW	9	(Russia) Aleksandr Bukharov	(substituted on) 79'	(yellow card) 85'
FW	48	(Russia) Aleksei Gasilin
FW	62	(Russia) Stepan Rebenko
FW	77	(Montenegro) Luka Đorđević
Manager:
(Italy) Luciano Spalletti

== See also ==
- 2013–14 Russian Premier League
- 2013–14 Russian Cup
