= 2015 Russian Super Cup =

- Event: Russian Super Cup
Zenit Saint Petersburg	Lokomotiv Moscow
1	1
- After extra time Zenit Saint Petersburg won 4–2 on penalties
- Date: 12 July 2015
- Venue: Petrovsky Stadium, Saint Petersburg
- Referee: Aleksei Nikolaev
- Attendance: 17,337

The 2015 Russian Football Super Cup (Russian: Суперкубок России по футболу) was the 13th Russian Super Cup match, a football match which was contested between the 2014–15 Russian Premier League champion, Zenit Saint Petersburg, and the 2014–15 Russian Cup champion, Lokomotiv Moscow.

The match was held on 12 July 2015 at the Petrovsky Stadium, in Saint Petersburg.

== Match details ==
12 July 2015
18:00 MSK (UTC+3)

Zenit Saint Petersburg	1–1 (a.e.t.)	Lokomotiv Moscow
Smolnikov 84'	Report	Niasse 28'
Penalties
Hulk (penalty scored); Witsel (penalty scored); Ansaldi (penalty scored); Shatov (penalty missed); Criscito (penalty scored)	4–2	(penalty missed) Grigoryev; (penalty scored) Samedov; (penalty scored) Pejčinović; (penalty missed) Ćorluka

Petrovsky Stadium, Saint Petersburg
Attendance: 17,337
Referee: Aleksei Nikolaev

Zenit	Lokomotiv

GK	1	(Russia) Yuri Lodigin
DF	19	(Russia) Igor Smolnikov	(substituted off) 120'
DF	6	(Belgium) Nicolas Lombaerts (c)
DF	4	(Italy) Domenico Criscito	(yellow card) 93'
DF	13	(Portugal) Luís Neto	(yellow card) 105'
MF	17	(Russia) Oleg Shatov
MF	14	(Russia) Artur Yusupov	(substituted off) 64'
MF	28	(Belgium) Axel Witsel
MF	21	(Spain) Javi García
FW	22	(Russia) Artyom Dzyuba	(substituted off) 64'
FW	7	(Brazil) Hulk	(yellow card) 95'
Substitutes:
GK	16	(Russia) Vyacheslav Malafeev
GK	41	(Russia) Mikhail Kerzhakov
DF	2	(Russia) Aleksandr Anyukov
DF	3	(Argentina) Cristian Ansaldi	(substituted in) 120'
MF	5	(Russia) Aleksandr Ryazantsev	(substituted in) 64'
MF	20	(Russia) Viktor Fayzulin
MF	94	(Russia) Alexey Yevseyev
FW	23	(Venezuela) Salomón Rondón	(substituted in) 64'
FW	92	(Russia) Pavel Dolgov
Manager:
(Portugal) André Villas-Boas Assistant referees: Aleksei Shiryayev; Aleksei Lunyov; Fourth official: Sergey Lapochkin

GK	1	(Brazil) Guilherme	(yellow card) 55'
DF	29	(Uzbekistan) Vitaliy Denisov
DF	49	(Russia) Roman Shishkin
DF	14	(Croatia) Vedran Ćorluka (c)
DF	5	(Serbia) Nemanja Pejčinović
MF	23	(Russia) Dmitri Tarasov	(yellow card) 75' (substituted off) 91'
MF	3	(Russia) Alan Kasaev	(yellow card) 43' (substituted off) 76'
MF	18	(Russia) Aleksandr Kolomeytsev	(yellow card) 120+'
MF	59	(Russia) Aleksei Miranchuk
FW	7	(Brazil) Maicon	(substituted off) 96'
FW	21	(Senegal) Baye Oumar Niasse
Substitutes:
GK	77	(Russia) Anton Kochenkov
DF	55	(Russia) Renat Yanbayev
DF	15	(Russia) Arseny Logashov
DF	17	(Ukraine) Taras Mykhalyk	(substituted in) 91'
MF	19	(Russia) Aleksandr Samedov	(substituted in) 76'
MF	9	(Russia) Maksim Grigoryev	(substituted in) 96'
MF	11	(Morocco) Mbark Boussoufa
MF	60	(Russia) Anton Miranchuk
MF	4	(Portugal) Manuel Fernandes
FW	32	(Serbia) Petar Škuletić
Manager:
(Tajikistan) Igor Cherevchenko

== Gallery ==
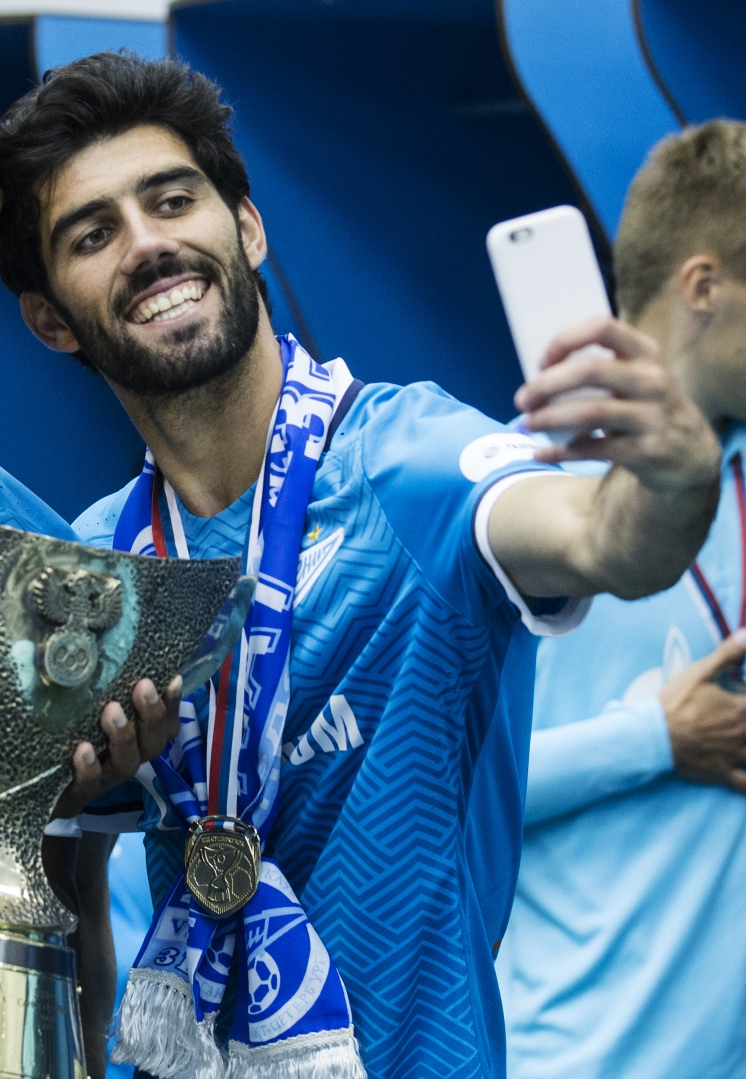
Luís Neto takes a selfie with the trophy after the triumph

== See also ==
- 2015–16 Russian Premier League
- 2015–16 Russian Cup
