= Aleksei Berezutski =

Russian footballer (born 1982)

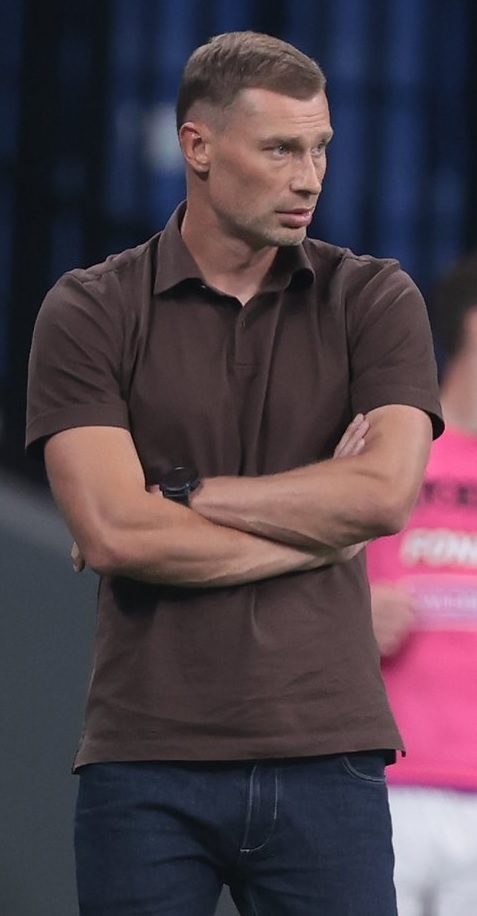
- Berezutski coaching CSKA Moscow in 2021

Personal information
- Full name: Aleksei Vladimirovich Berezutski
- Date of birth: 20 June 1982 (age 44)
- Place of birth: Moscow, Russian SFSR, Soviet Union
- Height: 1.90 m (6 ft 3 in)
- Positions: Centre back; left back

Youth career
- Smena

Senior career*
Years	Team	Apps	(Gls)
1999–2001	Torpedo-ZIL Moscow	2	(0)
2001	→ Chernomorets Novorossiysk (loan)	14	(1)
2001–2018	CSKA Moscow	341	(8)
Total		357	(9)

International career
2001–2003	Russia U-21	7	(0)
2003–2016	Russia	58	(0)

Managerial career
- 2019: Vitesse (assistant)
- 2021: CSKA Moscow (assistant)
- 2021–2022: CSKA Moscow
- 2024–2026: CSKA Moscow (assistant)
- * Club domestic league appearances and goals

Aleksei Vladimirovich Berezutski (Алексей Владимирович Березуцкий; born 20 June 1982) is a Russian football coach and a former player who played as a centre-back.

== Club career ==
He began his professional career in 1999 at the age of 17 at Torpedo Moscow, graduating from the club's famed academy. He spent the rest of his playing career at CSKA Moscow. He mostly played as a central defender but he could play as fullback, wingback, defensive midfielder or even as a winger. He scored CSKA Moscow's first goal as they came from behind to win the 2005 UEFA Cup Final.

Following his side's Champions League match against Manchester United at Old Trafford on 3 November 2009, Berezutsky (along with colleague Sergei Ignashevich) tested positive for the banned substance sudafed. The two players were provisionally suspended until the case was heard by the European governing body's disciplinary committee on 17 December, according to a UEFA statement. It was later revealed that they had taken a cold medicine which had not been reported, and both players were suspended for 1 game, which was applied retroactively.

He officially announced his retirement from playing on 21 July 2018.

== International career ==
Berezutski was a Russia national football team regular, making 32 appearances since 2003.

Aleksei was selected Russia's captain for the 0–3 friendly defeat against Romania, though it was speculated that Hiddink only gave him the captain's armband so he could differentiate between Aleksei and Vasili.

He was confirmed for the finalized UEFA Euro 2012 squad on 25 May 2012.

On 7 March 2018, he officially retired from international football.

== Coaching career ==
On 3 January 2019, Aleksei and his twin brother Vasili joined Dutch club Vitesse as assistant coaches to Leonid Slutsky, who trained them with CSKA and the national team.

In February 2021, he joined Vasili as an assistant to Viktor Goncharenko back at CSKA Moscow. In April 2021, Goncharenko moved to FC Krasnodar, with Vasili following him as an assistant. Aleksei remained at CSKA to assist the new manager (and former CSKA teammate) Ivica Olić.

On 15 June 2021, Berezutski was announced as CSKA Moscow caretaker manager after Ivica Olić left his role as manager by mutual consent. A little over a month later, 19 July 2021, Berezutski was confirmed as CSKA's new permanent head coach. On 25 March 2022, Berezutski was named Russian Premier League's coach of the month after CSKA won four games in the preceding month, extending their winning streak to 6 league matches overall.

On 15 June 2022, he left CSKA by mutual consent.

On 6 June 2024, Berezutski returned to CSKA as an assistant manager to Marko Nikolić. He left CSKA on 12 January 2026.

== Personal life ==
Aleksei started to play football in sport school Smena in Moscow, before moving to Torpedo's academy. He is married and has a daughter named Alyona. His identical twin brother, Vasili, is also a professional footballer, coming through the Torpedo academy alongside his brother, who he played with at CSKA too.

== Career statistics ==
=== Club ===
Club	Season	League			Cup		Continental		Other		Total	
Club	Season	Division	Apps	Goals	Apps	Goals	Apps	Goals	Apps	Goals	Apps	Goals
Torpedo-ZIL Moscow	2000	Russian First League	2	0	0	0	–		–		2	0
Chernomorets Novorossiysk (loan)	2001	Russian Premier League	14	1	–		–		–		14	1
CSKA Moscow	2001	Russian Premier League	0	0	0	0	–		–		0	0
CSKA Moscow	2002	Russian Premier League	16	0	1	0	2 (Note: Appearances in the UEFA Cup)	0	–		19	0
CSKA Moscow	2003	Russian Premier League	30	0	2	0	1 (Note: Appearances in the UEFA Champions League)	0	1 (Note: Appearances in the Russian Super Cup)	0	34	0
CSKA Moscow	2004	Russian Premier League	27	0	1	0	10	0	1	0	39	0
CSKA Moscow	2005	Russian Premier League	27	2	8	0	15 (Note: Fourteen appearances, one goal in the UEFA Cup, one appearance in the UEFA Super Cup)	1	–		50	3
CSKA Moscow	2006	Russian Premier League	29	0	7	0	8	0	1	0	45	0
CSKA Moscow	2007	Russian Premier League	26	0	3	0	8 (Note: Six appearances in the UEFA Champions League, two appearances in the UEFA Cup)	0	1	0	38	0
CSKA Moscow	2008	Russian Premier League	24	2	3	0	5	2	–		32	4
CSKA Moscow	2009	Russian Premier League	16	0	2	0	9 (Note: Five appearances in the UEFA Champions League, four appearances in the UEFA Cup)	0	1	0	28	0
CSKA Moscow	2010	Russian Premier League	23	1	0	0	8 (Note: Four appearances in the UEFA Champions League, four appearances in the UEFA Europa League)	0	1	0	32	1
CSKA Moscow	2011–12	Russian Premier League	40	0	4	0	10 (Note: Eight appearances in the UEFA Champions League, two appearances in the UEFA Europa League)	0	–		54	0
CSKA Moscow	2012–13	Russian Premier League	5	0	5	0	0	0	–		10	0
CSKA Moscow	2013–14	Russian Premier League	13	0	3	0	5	0	1	0	22	0
CSKA Moscow	2014–15	Russian Premier League	7	0	1	0	2	0	0	0	10	0
CSKA Moscow	2015–16	Russian Premier League	21	1	4	0	9	0	–		34	1
CSKA Moscow	2016–17	Russian Premier League	18	1	1	0	5	0	1	0	25	1
CSKA Moscow	2017–18	Russian Premier League	19	1	0	0	10 (Note: Six appearances in the UEFA Champions League, four appearances in the UEFA Europa League)	0	–		29	1
CSKA Moscow	Total		341	8	45	0	107	3	8	0	501	11
Career total			357	9	45	0	107	3	8	0	517	12

=== Managerial statistics ===
As of 21 May 2022

Team	Nat	From	To	Record							
Team	Nat	From	To	G	W	D	L	GF	GA	GD	Win %
CSKA Moscow	(Russia)	19 July 2021	15 June 2022	34	18	5	11	50	31	+19	52.94
Total				34	18	5	11	50	31	+19	52.94

== Honours ==
CSKA

- UEFA Cup: 2004–05
- Russian Premier League: 2003, 2005, 2006, 2012–13, 2013–14, 2015–16
- Russian Cup: 2001–02, 2004–05, 2005–06, 2007–08, 2008–09, 2010–11, 2012–13
- Russian Super Cup: 2004, 2006, 2007, 2009, 2013

Russia

- UEFA European Football Championship: 2008 bronze medalist

Individual

- In the list of 33 best football players of the championship of Russia: 2005, 2006, 2007, 2008, 2009, 2010

Preceded by Andrei Arshavin	Russia national football team captain 2008	Succeeded by Sergei Semak
