= Vasili Berezutski =

Russian footballer (born 1982)

Vasiliy Berezutski
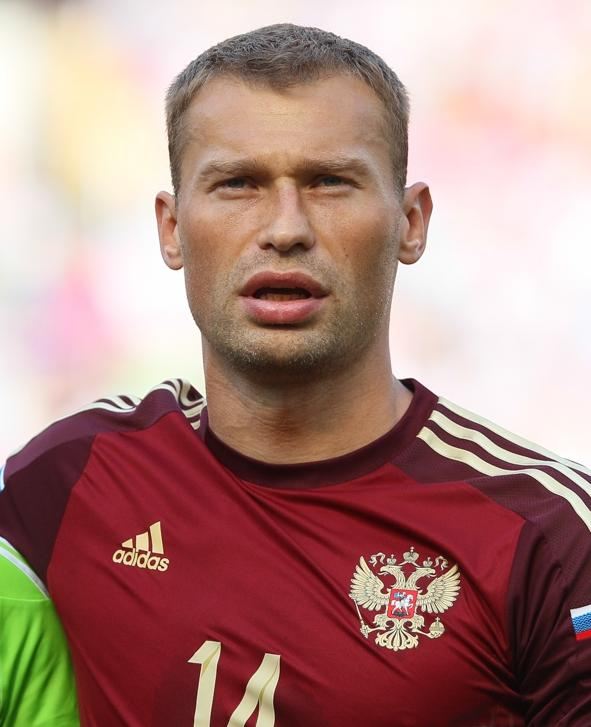
- Berezutski with Russia in 2014

Personal information
- Full name: Vasiliy Vladimirovich Berezutski
- Date of birth: 20 June 1982 (age 44)
- Place of birth: Moscow, Russian SFSR, Soviet Union
- Height: 1.89 m (6 ft 2 in)
- Positions: Centre back; right back

Youth career
- 1990–1997: Smena Moscow
- 1997–1999: Torpedo Moscow

Senior career*
Years	Team	Apps	(Gls)
1999–2001	Torpedo-ZIL Moscow	29	(0)
2002–2018	CSKA Moscow	376	(9)
Total		405	(9)

International career
2001–2003	Russia U-21	5	(1)
2003–2016	Russia	101	(5)

Managerial career
- 2019: Vitesse (assistant)
- 2020–2021: CSKA Moscow (assistant)
- 2021–2022: Krasnodar (assistant)
- 2022: CSKA Moscow (assistant)
- 2024: Shanghai Shenhua (assistant)
- 2024–2025: Sabah
- 2025–2026: Ural Yekaterinburg
- * Club domestic league appearances and goals

Vasili Vladimirovich Berezutski (Russian: Василий Владимирович Березуцкий; born 20 June 1982) is a Russian football manager and former player who played as a defender. He began his professional career in 1999 at the age of 17 with Torpedo Moscow, having graduated from their famed academy. He was a Russia national football team regular, earning his 100th cap on 6 September 2016 in a friendly against Ghana. He played as a fullback or centre-back and sometimes was also deployed as wingback or midfielder.

Vasili started to play football in sport school Smena in Moscow before going to Torpedo. His identical twin brother, Aleksei, also came through the Torpedo academy with him and played as a defender for CSKA Moscow.

He officially announced his retirement from playing on 21 July 2018.

== International career ==
Vasili scored his first goal for Russia during a Euro 2008 Qualification match against Macedonia.

He was called up to Russia's Euro 2008 squad and came on as a late substitute in their second game against Greece in Salzburg and started the semi-final against Spain in Vienna.

He was named in Russia's provisional squad for UEFA Euro 2012, but had to drop out before the tournament began due to a thigh injury.

On 2 June 2014, he was included in the Russia's 2014 FIFA World Cup squad, and appointed as the team captain. He was chosen in Russia's squad for Euro 2016 and scored an injury time equaliser in Russia's opening game against England.

On 7 March 2018, he officially retired from international football.

== Coaching career ==
On 3 January 2019, Vasili and his twin brother Aleksei joined Dutch club Vitesse as assistant coaches to Leonid Slutsky, who trained them with CSKA and the national team. In August 2020 he returned to CSKA Moscow as assistant to Viktor Goncharenko, where he was joined by Aleksei once again in February 2021. In April 2021, Goncharenko was fired by CSKA and hired by FC Krasnodar, and Vasili followed him as an assistant, with Aleksei staying back at CSKA. On 5 January 2022, Krasnodar fired Goncharenko and Berezutski. On 10 January 2022, he returned to CSKA as an assistant to his brother Aleksei, who was promoted to head coach by that time. On 15 June 2022, he left CSKA by mutual consent, together with his brother.

In early 2024, Berezutski moved to Chinese club Shanghai Shenhua, once again as an assistant to Slutsky.

On 25 November 2024 Berezutski signed a 2.5-year contract with Azerbaijani club Sabah, becoming the team's head coach. He led Sabah FK to a 2:2 (3:1 by penalty) win over Turan Tovuz PFK in the Azərbaycan Kuboku 2024/2025 Round of 16.

On 14 June 2025, Berezutski's contract with Sabah was terminated by mutual consent.

On 11 December 2025, Berezutski was hired by Russian First League club Ural Yekaterinburg. Under his management, Ural dropped from the second place (a direct promotion spot) to 3rd, which meant Ural qualified for promotion play-offs. They lost to Dynamo Makhachkala and remained in the First League.

== Career statistics ==
=== Club ===
Club	Season	League			Cup		Continental		Other		Total	
Club	Season	Division	Apps	Goals	Apps	Goals	Apps	Goals	Apps	Goals	Apps	Goals
Torpedo-ZIL Moscow	2000	Russian First League	3	0	0	0	–		–		3	0
Torpedo-ZIL Moscow	2001	Russian Premier League	26	0	2	0	–		–		28	0
Torpedo-ZIL Moscow	Total		29	0	2	0	0	0	0	0	31	0
CSKA Moscow	2002	Russian Premier League	2	0	0	0	0	0	–		2	0
CSKA Moscow	2003	Russian Premier League	23	0	0	0	1 (Note: Appearances in the UEFA Champions League)	0	2 (Note: One appearance in the Russian Super Cup, one appearance in the Russian Premier League Cup)	0	26	0
CSKA Moscow	2004	Russian Premier League	6	0	1	0	5	0	0	0	12	0
CSKA Moscow	2005	Russian Premier League	27	2	7	0	15 (Note: Fourteen appearances, two goals in the UEFA Cup, one appearance in the UEFA Super Cup)	2	–		49	4
CSKA Moscow	2006	Russian Premier League	26	1	7	0	6	0	1 (Note: Appearances in the Russian Super Cup)	0	40	1
CSKA Moscow	2007	Russian Premier League	26	1	4	0	7 (Note: Five appearances in the UEFA Champions League, two appearances in the UEFA Cup)	0	1	0	38	1
CSKA Moscow	2008	Russian Premier League	28	0	4	0	5 (Note: Appearances in the UEFA Cup)	0	–		37	0
CSKA Moscow	2009	Russian Premier League	28	2	3	0	10 (Note: Six appearances, one goal in the UEFA Champions League, four appearances in the UEFA Cup)	1	1	0	42	3
CSKA Moscow	2010	Russian Premier League	22	0	1	0	11 (Note: Four appearances in the UEFA Champions League, seven appearances in the UEFA Europa League)	0	1	0	35	0
CSKA Moscow	2011–12	Russian Premier League	36	0	6	0	12 (Note: Eight appearances, one goal in the UEFA Champions League, four appearances in the UEFA Europa League)	1	1	0	55	1
CSKA Moscow	2012–13	Russian Premier League	29	0	1	0	2 (Note: Appearances in the UEFA Europa League)	0	–		32	0
CSKA Moscow	2013–14	Russian Premier League	23	0	3	0	2	0	1	0	29	0
CSKA Moscow	2014–15	Russian Premier League	30	1	3	0	6	1	1	0	40	2
CSKA Moscow	2015–16	Russian Premier League	18	0	1	0	5	0	–		24	0
CSKA Moscow	2016–17	Russian Premier League	27	1	0	0	5	0	0	0	32	1
CSKA Moscow	2017–18	Russian Premier League	25	1	0	0	14 (Note: Nine appearances in the UEFA Champions League, five appearances in the UEFA Europa League)	0	–		39	1
CSKA Moscow	Total		376	9	41	0	106	5	9	0	532	14
Career total			405	9	43	0	106	5	9	0	563	14

=== International goals ===
Scores and results list Russia's goal tally first, score column indicates score after each Berezutski goal.

List of international goals scored by Vasili Berezutski
No.	Date	Venue	Cap	Opponent	Score	Result	Competition
1	8 September 2007	Lokomotiv Stadium, Moscow, Russia	22	Macedonia	1–0	3–0	UEFA Euro 2008 qualifying
2	5 September 2009	Petrovsky Stadium, Saint Petersburg, Russia	39	Liechtenstein	1–0	3–0	2010 FIFA World Cup qualification
3	10 September 2013	Petrovsky Stadium, Saint Petersburg, Russia	73	Israel	1–0	3–1	2014 FIFA World Cup qualification
4	6 June 2014	Lokomotiv Stadium, Moscow, Russia	79	Morocco	1–0	2–0	Friendly
5	11 June 2016	Stade Vélodrome, Marseille, France	97	England	1–1	1–1	UEFA Euro 2016

== Managerial statistics ==
As of match played 31 May 2025

Managerial record by team and tenure
Team	From	To	Record							
Team	From	To	G	W	D	L	GF	GA	GD	Win %
Sabah	25 November 2024	14 June 2025	28	10	13	5	39	32	+7	35.71
Total			28	10	13	5	39	32	+7	35.71

== Honours ==
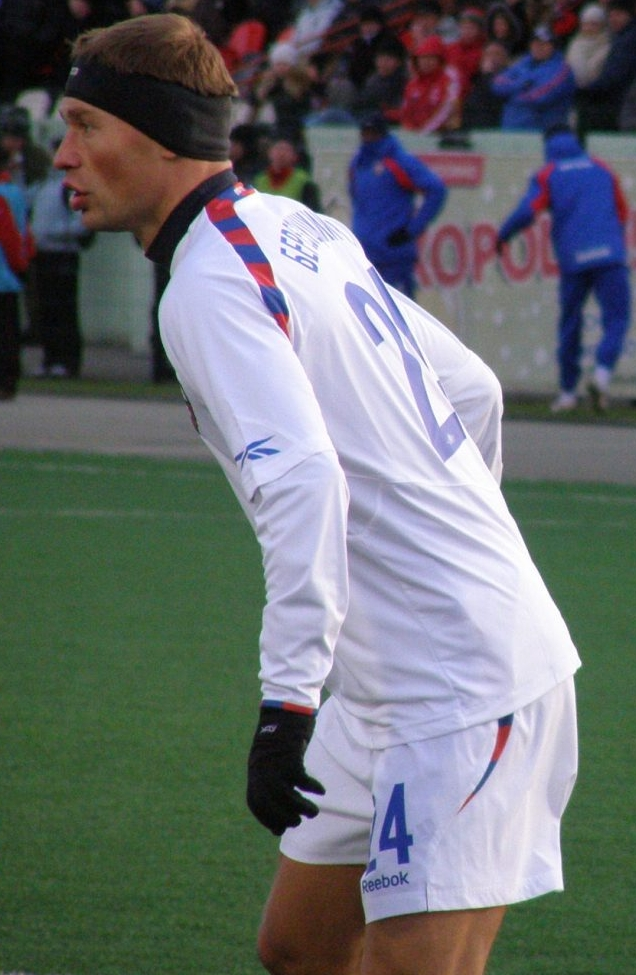
Berezutsky in action for PFC CSKA Moscow in 2009

=== Player ===
CSKA

- Russian Premier League (6): 2003, 2005, 2006, 2012–13, 2013–14, 2015–16
- Russian Cup (7): 2001–02, 2004–05, 2005–06, 2007–08, 2008–09, 2010–11, 2012–13
- Russian Super Cup: 2004, 2006, 2007, 2009, 2013
- UEFA Cup: 2004–05

Russia

- UEFA European Football Championship: 2008 bronze medalist

Individual

- In the list of 33 best football players of the championship of Russia (9): 2005, 2006, 2007, 2008, 2009, 2010, 2012, 2012–13, 2013–14.

=== Manager ===
Sabah

- Azerbaijan Cup: 2024–25

== See also ==
- List of men's footballers with 100 or more international caps
