= Russian Super Cup =

- Founded: 2003; 23 years ago
- Country: Russia
- Confederation: UEFA
- Number of clubs: 2
- Current champions: Zenit Saint Petersburg (10th title)
- Most championships: Zenit Saint Petersburg (10 titles)
- Broadcaster(s): Okko Sport
- Website: eng.premierliga.ru/rfpl/supercup/
- Current: 2026 Russian Super Cup

The Russian Super Cup (Russian: Суперкубок России) is a one-match football annual competition. Its official sponsored name is OLIMPBET Russian Supercup (Russian: ОЛИМПБЕТ Суперкубок России). The two participating clubs are the Russian Premier League champions and the Russian Cup winners. If the Premier League and the Cup are won by the same team, then the other participant is the league runners-up. The match is played at the beginning of the season, typically in July.

The trophy has been contested since 2003.

== Matches ==
Season	Winner	Score	Runner-up	Venue	Attendance
2003; Details	Lokomotiv Moscow; Winner of 2002 Russian Premier League	1 – 1 (a.e.t.); 4 – 3 (p)	CSKA Moscow; Winner of 2001–02 Russian Cup	Lokomotiv Stadium, Moscow	15,000
2004; Details	CSKA Moscow; Winner of 2003 Russian Premier League	3 – 1 (a.e.t.)	Spartak Moscow; Winner of 2002–03 Russian Cup	Lokomotiv Stadium, Moscow	18,000
2005; Details	Lokomotiv Moscow; Winner of 2004 Russian Premier League	1 – 0	Terek Grozny; Winner of 2003–04 Russian Cup	Lokomotiv Stadium, Moscow	11,000
2006; Details	CSKA Moscow; Winner of 2005 Russian Premier League and 2004–05 Russian Cup	3 – 2	Spartak Moscow; Runner-up of 2005 Russian Premier League	Luzhniki Stadium, Moscow	43,000
2007; Details	CSKA Moscow; Winner of 2006 Russian Premier League and 2005–06 Russian Cup	4 – 2	Spartak Moscow; Runner-up of 2006 Russian Premier League	Luzhniki Stadium, Moscow	45,000
2008; Details	Zenit Saint Petersburg; Winner of 2007 Russian Premier League	2 – 1	Lokomotiv Moscow; Winner of 2006–07 Russian Cup	Luzhniki Stadium, Moscow	48,000
2009; Details	CSKA Moscow; Winner of 2007–08 Russian Cup	2 – 1 (a.e.t.)	Rubin Kazan; Winner of 2008 Russian Premier League	Luzhniki Stadium, Moscow	15,000
2010; Details	Rubin Kazan; Winner of 2009 Russian Premier League	1 – 0	CSKA Moscow; Winner of 2008–09 Russian Cup	Luzhniki Stadium, Moscow	17,000
2011; Details	Zenit Saint Petersburg; Winner of 2010 Russian Premier League and 2009–10 Russian Cup	1 – 0	CSKA Moscow; Runner-up of 2010 Russian Premier League	Kuban Stadium, Krasnodar	26,000
2012; Details	Rubin Kazan; Winner of 2011–12 Russian Cup	2 – 0	Zenit Saint Petersburg; Winner of 2011–12 Russian Premier League	Metallurg Stadium, Samara	16,000
2013; Details	CSKA Moscow; Winner of 2012–13 Russian Premier League and 2012–13 Russian Cup	3 – 0	Zenit Saint Petersburg; Runner-up of 2012–13 Russian Premier League	Olimp-2 Stadium, Rostov-on-Don	16,000
2014; Details	CSKA Moscow; Winner of 2013–14 Russian Premier League	3 – 1	FC Rostov; Winner of 2013–14 Russian Cup	Kuban Stadium, Krasnodar	13,150
2015; Details	Zenit Saint Petersburg; Winner of 2014–15 Russian Premier League	1 – 1 (a.e.t.); 4 – 2 (p)	Lokomotiv Moscow; Winner of 2014–15 Russian Cup	Petrovsky Stadium, Saint Petersburg	17,337
2016; Details	Zenit Saint Petersburg; Winner of 2015–16 Russian Cup	1 – 0	CSKA Moscow; Winner of 2015–16 Russian Premier League	Lokomotiv Stadium, Moscow	22,000
2017; Details	Spartak Moscow; Winner of 2016–17 Russian Premier League	2 – 1 (a.e.t.)	Lokomotiv Moscow; Winner of 2016–17 Russian Cup	Lokomotiv Stadium, Moscow	24,444
2018; Details	CSKA Moscow; Runner-up of 2017–18 Russian Premier League (Note: CSKA replaced 2017–18 Russian Cup winners FC Tosno as Tosno was dissolved after the season.)	1 – 0 (a.e.t.)	Lokomotiv Moscow; Winner of 2017–18 Russian Premier League	Nizhny Novgorod Stadium, Nizhny Novgorod	43,319
2019; Details	Lokomotiv Moscow; Winner of 2018–19 Russian Cup	3 – 2	Zenit Saint Petersburg; Winner of 2018–19 Russian Premier League	VTB Arena, Moscow	21,382
2020; Details	Zenit Saint Petersburg; Winner of 2019–20 Russian Premier League and 2019–20 Russian Cup	2 – 1	Lokomotiv Moscow; Runner-up of 2019–20 Russian Premier League	VEB Arena, Moscow	5,942
2021; Details	Zenit Saint Petersburg; Winner of 2020–21 Russian Premier League	3 – 0	Lokomotiv Moscow; Winner of 2020–21 Russian Cup	Kaliningrad Stadium, Kaliningrad	16,388
2022; Details	Zenit Saint Petersburg; Winner of 2021–22 Russian Premier League	4 – 0	Spartak Moscow; Winner of 2021–22 Russian Cup	Gazprom Arena, Saint Petersburg	55,608
2023; Details	Zenit Saint Petersburg; Winner of 2022–23 Russian Premier League	0 – 0; 5 – 4 (p)	CSKA Moscow; Winner of 2022–23 Russian Cup	Kazan Arena, Kazan	42,873
2024; Details	Zenit Saint Petersburg; Winner of 2023–24 Russian Premier League and 2023–24 Russian Cup	4 – 2	Krasnodar; Runner-up of 2023–24 Russian Premier League	Volgograd Arena, Volgograd	41,984
2025; Details	CSKA Moscow; Winner of 2024–25 Russian Cup	1 – 0	Krasnodar; Winner of 2024–25 Russian Premier League	Kazan Arena, Kazan	34,677
2026; Details	Zenit Saint Petersburg; Winner of 2025–26 Russian Premier League	1 – 1; 4 – 2 (p)	Spartak Moscow; Winner of 2025–26 Russian Cup	Nizhny Novgorod Stadium, Nizhny Novgorod	42,139

== Statistics by team ==
Team	Years won	Runners-up
Zenit Saint Petersburg	10 (2008, 2011, 2015, 2016, 2020, 2021, 2022, 2023, 2024, 2026)	3 (2012, 2013, 2019)
CSKA Moscow	8 (2004, 2006, 2007, 2009, 2013, 2014, 2018, 2025)	5 (2003, 2010, 2011, 2016, 2023)
Lokomotiv Moscow	3 (2003, 2005, 2019)	6 (2008, 2015, 2017, 2018, 2020, 2021)
Rubin Kazan	2 (2010, 2012)	1 (2009)
Spartak Moscow	1 (2017)	5 (2004, 2006, 2007, 2022, 2026)
Krasnodar	–	2 (2024, 2025)
Terek Grozny	–	1 (2005)
Rostov	–	1 (2014)
Total	24	24

== Statistics by player ==
Player	Years won	Runners-up
Igor Akinfeev	8 (2004, 2006, 2007, 2009, 2013, 2014, 2018, 2025)	5 (2003, 2010, 2011, 2016, 2023)
Sergei Ignashevich	7 (2003, 2004, 2006, 2007, 2009, 2013, 2014)	3 (2010, 2011, 2016)
Mikhail Kerzhakov	7 (2015, 2016, 2020, 2021, 2022, 2023, 2024)	1 (2019)
Vasili Berezutski	6 (2004, 2006, 2007, 2009, 2013, 2014)	4 (2003, 2010, 2011, 2016)
Aleksei Berezutski	6 (2004, 2006, 2007, 2009, 2013, 2014)	4 (2003, 2010, 2011, 2016)
Yuri Zhirkov	6 (2004, 2006, 2007, 2009, 2016, 2020)	1 (2019)

== See also ==
- USSR Super Cup
