= 2005 FC Spartak Moscow season =

Spartak Moscow
2005 season
- Manager: Aleksandrs Starkovs
- Stadium: Luzhniki Stadium
- Premier League: 2nd
- Russian Cup: Progressed to 2006 season
- Top goalscorer: League: Roman Pavlyuchenko (11); All: Roman Pavlyuchenko (12)

The 2005 FC Spartak Moscow season was the club's 14th season in the Russian Premier League season. Spartak finished the season in 2nd position, qualifying for the 2006–07 UEFA Champions League Second Qualifying Round. In the 2005–06 Russian Cup, Spartak progressed to the Quarterfinals of the Russian Cup which took place during the 2006 season.

== Squad ==
As of match played 19 November 2005

No.	Name	Nationality	Position	Date of birth (age)	Signed from	Signed in	Contract ends	Apps.	Goals
Goalkeepers
1	Dmitri Khomich	(Russia)	Gk	4 October 1984 (aged 21)	Alania Vladikavkaz	2005		1	0
12	Ivan Komissarov	(Russia)	GK	28 May 1988 (aged 17)	Youth Team	2005		0	0
30	Wojciech Kowalewski	(Poland)	GK	11 May 1977 (aged 28)	Shakhtar Donetsk	2003	2008	80	0
46	Aleksei Zuev	(Russia)	GK	3 February 1981 (aged 24)	Spartak-Zvezda Shchyolkovo	2001			
Defenders
2	Yuri Kovtun	(Russia)	DF	5 January 1970 (aged 35)	Dynamo Moscow	1999	2005		
5	Adrian Iencsi	(Romania)	DF	15 March 1975 (aged 30)	Rapid București	2004	2006	36	2
13	Martin Jiránek	(Czech Republic)	DF	25 May 1979 (aged 26)	Reggina	2004		34	0
15	Radoslav Kováč	(Czech Republic)	DF	27 November 1979 (aged 25)	Sparta Prague	2005		28	5
17	Clemente Rodríguez	(Argentina)	DF	31 July 1981 (aged 24)	Boca Juniors	2004		35	2
18	Dmytro Parfenov	(Ukraine)	DF	11 September 1974 (aged 31)	Dnipro Dnipropetrovsk	1998	2005		
20	Ignas Dedura	(Lithuania)	DF	6 January 1978 (aged 27)	Skonto	2004		27	2
26	Nemanja Vidić	(Serbia and Montenegro)	DF	21 October 1981 (aged 24)	Red Star Belgrade	2004		41	4
35	Sergei Kabanov	(Russia)	DF	15 March 1986 (aged 19)	Youth Team	2002		0	0
36	Fyodor Kudryashov	(Russia)	DF	5 April 1987 (aged 18)	Sibiryak Bratsk	2005		1	0
38	Yevgeny Krug	(Russia)	DF	20 April 1986 (aged 19)	Chkalovets-Olimpik Novosibirsk	2005		0	0
49	Roman Shishkin	(Russia)	DF	27 January 1987 (aged 18)	Youth Team	2004		8	0
77	Yevgeni Shpedt	(Russia)	DF	26 January 1986 (aged 19)	Chkalovets-Olimpik Novosibirsk	2005	2007 (+2)	1	0
Midfielders
4	Andrejs Rubins	(Latvia)	MF	26 November 1978 (aged 26)	Shinnik Yaroslavl	2005	2008	7	0
7	Denis Boyarintsev	(Russia)	MF	6 February 1978 (aged 27)	Rubin Kazan	2005		28	4
8	Dmitri Alenichev	(Russia)	MF	20 December 1972 (aged 32)	Porto	2004		193	31
9	Yegor Titov	(Russia)	MF	29 May 1976 (aged 29)	Youth Team	1995		350	85
11	Aleksandr Pavlenko	(Russia)	MF	20 January 1985 (aged 20)	Lausanne-Sport	2001		94	7
23	Vladimir Bystrov	(Russia)	MF	31 January 1984 (aged 21)	Zenit St.Petersburg	2005	2008	15	3
24	Mozart	(Brazil)	MF	8 November 1980 (aged 25)	Reggina	2005		7	0
25	Maksym Kalynychenko	(Ukraine)	MF	26 January 1979 (aged 26)	Dnipro Dnipropetrovsk	2000		132	22
27	Serghei Covalciuc	(Moldova)	MF	20 January 1982 (aged 23)	Karpaty Lviv	2004		21	2
34	Dmitri Tarasov	(Russia)	MF	18 March 1987 (aged 18)	Youth Team	2005		0	0
39	Aleksei Rebko	(Russia)	MF	23 April 1986 (aged 19)	Youth Team	2001		4	0
48	Nikolai Tyunin	(Russia)	MF	6 January 1987 (aged 18)	Youth Team	2004		1	0
Forwards
10	Roman Pavlyuchenko	(Russia)	FW	15 December 1981 (aged 23)	Rotor Volgograd	2003		93	39
19	Fernando Cavenaghi	(Argentina)	FW	21 September 1983 (aged 22)	River Plate	2004		34	8
28	Mihajlo Pjanović	(Serbia and Montenegro)	FW	13 February 1977 (aged 28)	Red Star Belgrade	2003	2007	48	12
32	Nikita Bazhenov	(Russia)	FW	1 February 1985 (aged 20)	Saturn Ramenskoye	2004		23	3
37	Tarmo Kink	(Estonia)	FW	6 October 1985 (aged 20)	Real Tallinn	2003		6	0
40	Aleksandr Laktionov	(Russia)	FW	28 May 1986 (aged 19)	Youth Team	2005		1	0
50	Aleksandr Sonin	(Russia)	FW	6 August 1983 (aged 22)	Saint-Étienne	2001			
Away on loan
6	Florin Șoavă	(Romania)	MF	24 July 1978 (aged 27)	Rapid București	2004	2008	42	1
16	Aleksei Solosin	(Russia)	GK	11 August 1987 (aged 18)	Youth Team	2004		0	0
31	Gabriel Tamaș	(Romania)	DF	5 November 1983 (aged 22)	Galatasaray	2004	2007	19	0
41	Dmitri Torbinski	(Russia)	MF	28 April 1984 (aged 21)	Youth Team	2001		18	0
44	Luc Zoa	(Cameroon)	DF	14 April 1986 (aged 19)	Orlando Pirates	2004	2007	3	0
	Aleš Urbánek	(Czech Republic)	MF	25 May 1980 (aged 25)	Sigma Olomouc	2004	2007	8	0
	Pavel Pogrebnyak	(Russia)	FW	8 November 1983 (aged 22)	Youth Team	2002		24	5
Players that left Spartak Moscow during the season
3	Emanuel Pogatetz	(Austria)	DF	16 January 1983 (aged 22)	loan from Bayer Leverkusen	2005	2005	11	0
14	Aleksandr Samedov	(Russia)	MF	19 July 1984 (aged 21)	Youth Team	2001		58	9
44	Andrei Strelnikov	(Russia)	MF	10 April 1986 (aged 19)	Izhevsk	2005		0	0

=== On loan ===
Note: Flags indicate national team as defined under FIFA eligibility rules; some limited exceptions apply. Players may hold more than one non-FIFA nationality.

No.	Pos.	Nation	Player
6	MF	ROU	Florin Șoavă (at Krylia Sovetov)
16	GK	RUS	Aleksei Solosin (at Spartak Chelyabinsk)
31	DF	ROU	Gabriel Tamaș (at Dinamo București)
41	MF	RUS	Dmitri Torbinski (at Spartak Chelyabinsk)

No.	Pos.	Nation	Player
44	DF	CMR	Luc Zoa (at Anzhi Makhachkala)
—	MF	CZE	Aleš Urbánek (at Artmedia Petržalka)
—	FW	RUS	Pavel Pogrebnyak (at Shinnik Yaroslavl)

=== Left club during season ===
Note: Flags indicate national team as defined under FIFA eligibility rules; some limited exceptions apply. Players may hold more than one non-FIFA nationality.

No.	Pos.	Nation	Player
3	DF	AUT	Emanuel Pogatetz (loan return to Bayer Leverkusen)
14	MF	RUS	Aleksandr Samedov (to Lokomotiv Moscow)

No.	Pos.	Nation	Player
44	MF	RUS	Andrei Strelnikov (to Volga Nizhny Novgorod)

== Transfers ==
=== In ===
Date	Position	Nationality	Name	From	Fee	Ref.
5 January 2005	GK	(Russia)	Dmitri Khomich	Alania Vladikavkaz	Free	
5 January 2005	MF	(Latvia)	Andrejs Rubins	Shinnik Yaroslavl	Undisclosed	
20 January 2005	DF	(Russia)	Yevgeni Shpedt	Chkalovets-Olimpik Novosibirsk	Undisclosed	
7 March 2005	DF	(Czech Republic)	Radoslav Kováč	Sparta Prague	Undisclosed	
Winter 2005	DF	(Russia)	Yevgeny Krug	Chkalovets-Olimpik Novosibirsk	Undisclosed	
Winter 2005	DF	(Russia)	Fyodor Kudryashov	Sibiryak Bratsk	Undisclosed	
Winter 2005	MF	(Russia)	Denis Boyarintsev	Rubin Kazan	Undisclosed	
Winter 2005	MF	(Russia)	Andrei Strelnikov	Izhevsk	Undisclosed	
30 June 2005	MF	(Russia)	Vladimir Bystrov	Zenit St.Petersburg	€3.3m	
19 August 2005	MF	(Brazil)	Mozart	Reggina	Undisclosed	

=== Loans in ===
Date from	Position	Nationality	Name	From	Date to	Ref.
Winter 2005	DF	(Austria)	Emanuel Pogatetz	Bayer Leverkusen	Summer 2005	

=== Out ===
Date	Position	Nationality	Name	To	Fee	Ref.
Summer 2005	MF	(Russia)	Aleksandr Samedov	Lokomotiv Moscow	Undisclosed	
Summer 2005	MF	(Russia)	Andrei Strelnikov	Volga Nizhny Novgorod	Undisclosed	

=== Loans out ===
Date from	Position	Nationality	Name	To	Date to	Ref.
Summer 2004	DF	(Romania)	Gabriel Tamaș	Dinamo București	End of 2005 Season	
Summer 2004	MF	(Czech Republic)	Aleš Urbánek	Sparta Prague	Summer 2005	
Winter 2005	GK	(Russia)	Aleksei Solosin	Spartak Chelyabinsk	End of Season	
Winter 2005	MF	(Russia)	Dmitri Torbinski	Spartak Chelyabinsk	End of Season	
Summer 2005	DF	(Cameroon)	Luc Zoa	Anzhi Makhachkala	End of Season	
Summer 2005	MF	(Czech Republic)	Aleš Urbánek	Artmedia Petržalka	Summer 2006	
31 August 2005	MF	(Romania)	Florin Șoavă	Krylia Sovetov	End of Season	

=== Released ===
Date	Position	Nationality	Name	Joined	Date
31 December 2005	DF	(Russia)	Yuri Kovtun	Alania Vladikavkaz	
31 December 2005	DF	(Ukraine)	Dmytro Parfenov	Dynamo Moscow	
31 December 2005	MF	(Russia)	Nikolai Tyunin	Presnya Moscow	
31 December 2005	FW	(Russia)	Aleksandr Sonin	Ditton	

== Competitions ==
=== Premier League ===
==== Results by round ====
Round	1	2	3	4	5	6	7	8	9	10	11	12	13	14	15	16	17	18	19	20	21	22	23	24	25	26	27	28	29	30
Ground	H	H	H	A	H	A	H	A	H	A	A	A	H	A	H	A	A	A	H	A	H	A	H	A	H	H	H	A	H	A
Result	L	W	D	W	W	L	W	W	L	W	D	W	D	D	L	L	D	D	W	W	W	W	W	L	W	D	W	W	W	D

Updated to match(es) played on 19 November 2005. Source: See Results
A = Away; H = Home; W = Win; D = Draw; L = Loss

==== Results ====
12 March 2005 1	Spartak Moscow	0 – 2	FC Moscow	Moscow
18:00 MSK (UTC+3)	Alenichev (yellow card) 26' (penalty missed) 34'; Iencsi (yellow card) 49'; Vidić (yellow card) 72'	Report	Jop 23' (yellow card) 25'; Kuzmin (yellow card) 28'; Kirichenko 56'	Stadium: Luzhniki Stadium; Attendance: 16,000; Referee: Igor Egorov

20 March 2005 2	Spartak Moscow	3 – 0	Rubin Kazan	Kazan
17:00 MSK (UTC+3)	Pavlenko (yellow card) 15'; Cavenaghi 31' (pen.); Vidić (yellow card) 35'; Titov 64', 73'	Report	Astafjevs (yellow card) 9'; Scotti (yellow card) 15'; Koliņko (yellow card) 31'; Sinyov (yellow card) 33'	Stadium: Central Stadium; Attendance: 10,000; Referee: Sergey Fursa

3 April 2005 3	Spartak Moscow	1 – 1	Amkar Perm	Moscow
19:00 MSK (DST) (UTC+4)	Pjanović (yellow card) 22'; Kováč (yellow card) 37'; Dedura (yellow card) 54'; Boyarintsev (yellow card) 82'; Cavenaghi 90'	Report	Lavrik (yellow card) 27'; Shutov 68'; Lincar (yellow card) 79'	Stadium: Luzhniki Stadium; Attendance: 15,000; Referee: Stanislav Sukhina

10 April 2005 4	Rostov	0 – 1	Spartak Moscow	Rostov-on-Don
12,000 MSK (DST) (UTC+4)	Pérez (yellow card) 67'	Report	Pogatetz (yellow card) 27'; Pavlyuchenko 65'; Cavenaghi (yellow card) 76'; Kowalewski (yellow card) 90'	Stadium: Olimp-2; Attendance: 12,000; Referee: Vladimir Pettay

17 April 2005 5	Spartak Moscow	5 – 1	Dynamo Moscow	Moscow
18:00 MSK (DST) (UTC+4)	Cavenaghi 17', 30'; Boyarintsev 34', 57'; Rodríguez (yellow card) 81' (goal) 86'	Report	Ribeiro 14'; Gyan (yellow card) 40'	Stadium: Luzhniki Stadium; Attendance: 26,000; Referee: Igor Zakharov

23 April 2005 6	Alania Vladikavkaz	2 – 1	Spartak Moscow	Vladikavkaz
17:00 MSK (DST) (UTC+4)	D.Bazayev (yellow card) 3' (goal) 65'; Agayev (yellow card) 36'; Dadu 58' (yellow card) 59'; Žutautas (yellow card) 80'	Report	Vidić (yellow card) 8'; Pavlyuchenko 51'	Stadium: Republican Stadium; Attendance: 21,000; Referee: Alexey Tyumin

1 May 2005 7	Spartak Moscow	3 – 0	Terek Grozny	Moscow
18:00 MSK (DST) (UTC+4)	Dedura 20'; Vidić (yellow card) 52'; Kováč (yellow card) 73'; Boyarintsev 88'; Kalynychenko 90+' (yellow card) 90+'	Report	Lipko (yellow card) 82'	Stadium: Luzhniki Stadium; Attendance: 12,000; Referee: Sergey Fursa

15 May 2005 8	Tom Tomsk	0 – 1	Spartal Moscow	Tomsk
14:00 MSK (DST) (UTC+4)	Bulatov (yellow card) 45'	Report	Kováč (yellow card) 15'; Pogatetz (yellow card) 75'; Pavlenko 76'	Stadium: Trud Stadium; Attendance: 14,200; Referee: Nikolai Ivanov

22 May 2005 9	Spartak Moscow	1 – 3	CSKA Moscow	Moscow
19:00 MSK (DST) (UTC+4)	Boyarintsev 28'; Kováč (yellow card) 50'	Report	Aldonin 51'; Zhirkov (yellow card) 55'; V.Berezutski 60'; Olić 84' (yellow card) 84'	Stadium: Luzhniki Stadium; Attendance: 63,000; Referee: Florian Meyer

28 May 2005 10	Krylia Sovetov	1 – 3	Spartak Moscow	Samara
18:00 MSK (DST) (UTC+4)	Bobyor 41'; Karyaka (yellow card) 60'; Koroman (yellow card) 74'	Report	Kalynychenko 30', 54'; Pavlenko (yellow card) 83'; Pavlyuchenko 87' (yellow card) 87'	Stadium: Metallurg Stadium; Attendance: 26,000; Referee: Alexey Tyumin

11 June 2005 11	Zenit St.Petersburg	1 – 1	Spartak Moscow	Saint Petersburg
14:00 MSK (DST) (UTC+4)	Flachbart (yellow card) 45+'; Kerzhakov 85'	Report	Pogatetz (yellow card) 35'; Pavlyuchenko 59' (yellow card) 65'; Vidić (yellow card) 72'; Iencsi (yellow card) 89'	Stadium: Petrovsky Stadium; Attendance: 21,725; Referee: Alexander Evstigneev

18 June 2005 12	Torpedo Moscow	1 – 3	Spartak Moscow	Moscow
14:00 MSK (DST) (UTC+4)	Volkov 69' (yellow card) 88'	Report	Pavlyuchenko 21', 61'; Kováč 35'	Stadium: Luzhniki Stadium; Attendance: 27,000; Referee: Igor Zakharov

25 June 2005 13	Spartak Moscow	1 – 1	Shinnik Yaroslavl	Moscow
18:00 MSK (DST) (UTC+4)	Vidić 9' (pen.); Pogatetz (red card) 11'	Report	Khazov 80'; Dubinskiy (yellow card) 85'; Branco (yellow card) 86'	Stadium: Luzhniki Stadium; Attendance: 13,000; Referee: Vladimir Pettay

2 July 2005 14	Saturn Ramenskoye	1 – 1	Spartak Moscow	Ramenskoye
18:00 MSK (DST) (UTC+4)	Kharitonov 38' (yellow card) 90'; Bystrov (yellow card) 45'	Report	Vidić (yellow card) 45'; Jiránek (yellow card) 47'; Pavlyuchenko 56'; Boyarintsev (yellow card) 77'; Covalciuc (yellow card) 79'; Dedura (yellow card) 83'	Stadium: Saturn Stadium; Attendance: 15,000; Referee: Nikolai Ivanov

9 July 2005 15	Spartak Moscow	1 – 2	Lokomotiv Moscow	Moscow
14:00 MSK (DST) (UTC+4)	Cavenaghi 80'	Report	Sychev 47'; Maminov (yellow card) 70'; Evseev (yellow card) 76'; Bilyaletdinov 78'	Stadium: Luzhniki Stadium; Attendance: 35,000; Referee: Yuri Baskakov

16 July 2005 16	FC Moscow	3 – 1	Spartak Moscow	Moscow
14:00 MSK (DST) (UTC+4)	Ivanov (yellow card) 19'; Kirichenko 44', 71'; Bracamonte 67'; Tchuissé (yellow card) 82'	Report	Vidić (yellow card) 49'; Pavlenko 83'	Stadium: Eduard Streltsov Stadium; Attendance: 12,000; Referee: Alexander Kolobaev

23 July 2005 17	Rubin Kazan	0 – 0	Spartak Moscow	Kazan
18:00 MSK (DST) (UTC+4)	Fyodorov (yellow card) 36'; Scotti (yellow card) 42'	Report	Dedura (yellow card) 16'; Kowalewski (yellow card) 25'; Kováč (yellow card) 36'; Rodríguez (yellow card) 59'	Stadium: Central Stadium; Attendance: 21,500; Referee: Alexander Evstigneev

30 July 2005 18	Amkar Perm	0 – 0	Spartak Moscow	Perm
17:00 MSK (DST) (UTC+4)	Sirakov (yellow card) 17'	Report	Pavlenko (yellow card) 19'; Kováč (yellow card) 76'	Stadium: Zvezda Stadium; Attendance: 15,500; Referee: Igor Egorov

7 August 2005 19	Spartak Moscow	2 – 0	Rostov	Moscow
18:00 MSK (DST) (UTC+4)	Pjanović (yellow card) 7' (goal) 14'; Bazhenov 52' (yellow card) 62'	Report	Osinov (yellow card) 9'; Shirshov (yellow card) 59'; Olenikov (yellow card) 70'	Stadium: Luzhniki Stadium; Attendance: 9,000; Referee: Nikolai Ivanov

20 August 2005 20	Dynamo Moscow	0 – 1	Spartak Moscow	Moscow
14:00 MSK (DST) (UTC+4)	Costinha (yellow card) 16'; Ribeiro 30'; Tanasijević (yellow card) 86'	Report	Rodríguez (yellow card) 63'; Pavlyuchenko 78'	Stadium: Dynamo Stadium; Attendance: 20,000; Referee: Aleksandr Kolobaev

27 August 2005 21	Spartak Moscow	5 – 1	Alania Vladikavkaz	Moscow
14:00 MSK (DST) (UTC+4)	Kováč 12', 51'; Covalciuc 20'; Bystrov 44'; Kowalewski (yellow card) 57'; Vidić (yellow card) 57'; Pavlyuchenko (yellow card) 66'; Cavenaghi 72'	Report	Kvirkvelia (yellow card) 4' (yellow-red card) 25'; D.Bazayev 54' (pen.) (yellow card) 57'; Bazayev (yellow card) 57'; Đorđević (yellow card) 65'	Stadium: Dynamo Stadium; Attendance: 10,000; Referee: Igor Egorov

11 September 2005 22	Terek Grozny	1 – 2	Spartak Moscow	Pyatigorsk
18:00 MSK (DST) (UTC+4)	Sırxayev 90'; Gaisumov (yellow card) 90+'	Report	Bystrov 18'; Iencsi 90+'	Stadium: Central Stadium; Attendance: 10,000; Referee: Alexander Evstigneev

17 September 2005 23	Spartak Moscow	2 – 1	Tom Tomsk	Moscow
18:00 MSK (DST) (UTC+4)	Kováč (yellow card) 15'; Covalciuc 16'; Pavlyuchenko 43'; Vidić (yellow card) 55'; Cavenaghi (yellow card) 66'	Report	Vejić 14'; Kaleshin (yellow card) 24'; Budunov (yellow card) 90+'	Stadium: Luzhniki Stadium; Attendance: 9,000; Referee: Sergey Lapochkin

24 September 2005 24	CSKA Moscow	1 – 0	Spartak Moscow	Moscow
14:00 MSK (DST) (UTC+4)	Carvalho 6'	Report	Mozart (yellow card) 11'; Rodríguez (yellow card) 45'; Vidić (yellow card) 87'	Stadium: Dynamo Stadium; Attendance: 33,000; Referee: Igor Egorov

2 October 2005 25	Spartak Moscow	1 – 0	Krylia Sovetov	Moscow
18:00 MSK (DST) (UTC+4)	Vidić (yellow card) 19'; Kováč 50'	Report	Bulyga (yellow card) 26'	Stadium: Luzhniki Stadium; Attendance: 12,000; Referee: Vladimir Pettay

16 October 2005 26	Spartak Moscow	1 – 1	Zenit St.Petersburg	Moscow
14:00 MSK (DST) (UTC+4)	Mozart (yellow card) 24'; Bystrov (yellow card) 75'; Vidić 80' (pen.); Kováč (yellow card) 87'	Report	Škrtel (yellow card) 36'; Mareš (yellow card) 45+'; Flachbart (yellow card) 52'; Arshavin 60'; Šumulikoski (yellow card) 90+'	Stadium: Luzhniki Stadium; Attendance: 30,000; Referee: Manuel Mejuto González

22 October 2005 27	Spartak Moscow	1 – 0	Torpedo Moscow	Moscow
14:00 MSK (DST) (UTC+4)	Mozart (yellow card) 5'; Kalynychenko (yellow card) 41' (goal) 70'; Alenichev (yellow card) 79'; Titov (yellow card) 84'	Report	Byrlov (yellow card) 4'; Panov (yellow card) 12'	Stadium: Luzhniki Stadium; Attendance: 11,000; Referee: Igor Zakharov

29 October 2005 28	Shinnik Yaroslavl	1 – 3	Spartak Moscow	Yaroslavl
16:00 MSK (UTC+3)	Jurić (yellow card) 33'; Chernogayev (yellow card) 64' (goal) 79'; Starostyak (yellow card) 80'	Report	Bystrov 23'; Pavlyuchenko 25', 90+'; Rodríguez (yellow card) 33'; Vidić (yellow card) 71'	Stadium: Shinnik Stadium; Attendance: 14,000; Referee: Stanislav Sukhina

6 November 2005 29	Spartak Moscow	1 – 0	Saturn Ramenskoye	Moscow
14:00 MSK (UTC+3)	Pavlyuchenko (yellow card) 6'; Dedura (yellow card) 63'; Titov 75'	Report	Yesipov (yellow card) 44'; Lešnjak (yellow card) 64'; Igonin (yellow card) 86'	Stadium: Luzhniki Stadium; Attendance: 16,000; Referee: Nikolai Ivanov

19 November 2005 30	Lokomotiv Moscow	1 – 1	Spartak Moscow	Moscow
14:00 MSK (UTC+3)	Asatiani (yellow card) 39' (goal) 85'; Evseev (yellow card) 55'; Bikey (yellow card) 58'; Ruopolo (yellow card) 86'	Report	Bystrov (yellow card) 45'; Titov 62'; Kowalewski (yellow card) 86'	Stadium: Lokomotiv Stadium; Attendance: 28,800; Referee: Valentin Ivanov

==== League table ====
Pos	Team	Pld	W	D	L	GF	GA	GD	Pts	Qualification or relegation
1	CSKA Moscow (C)	30	18	8	4	48	20	+28	62	Qualification to Champions League third qualifying round
2	Spartak Moscow	30	16	8	6	47	26	+21	56	Qualification to Champions League second qualifying round
3	Lokomotiv Moscow	30	14	14	2	41	18	+23	56	Qualification to UEFA Cup first round (Note: Since CSKA Moscow won the 2005–06 Russian Cup, and winner of the Russian Cup should advance to the First Round of UEFA Cup, the spot was awarded to 3rd-positioned team, because CSKA Moscow already qualified for UEFA Champions League. As a result, 4th-positioned team received a spot in the Second Qualifying Round of UEFA Cup, and 5th-positioned team received a spot in the Second Round of UEFA Intertoto Cup)
4	Rubin Kazan	30	14	9	7	45	31	+14	51	Qualification to UEFA Cup second qualifying round
5	FC Moscow	30	14	8	8	36	26	+10	50	Qualification to Intertoto Cup second round

Source: RFPL
Rules for classification: 1st points; 2nd matches won; 3rd goal difference; 4th head-to-head (points, matches won, goal difference, goals scored, away goals scored)
(C) Champions

=== Russian Cup ===
==== 2005-06 ====
6 July 2005 Round of 32 1st leg	Spartak Moscow	6 – 0	Okean Nakhodka	Moscow
18:00 MSK (DST) (UTC+4)	Pavlyuchenko 16'; Cavenaghi 44'; Dedura 52'; Kalynychenko 54'; Rodríguez 55'; Kováč 79'	Report	Lodis (yellow card) 5'; Kochkin (yellow card) 38'	Stadium: Luzhniki Stadium; Attendance: 6,000; Referee: Sergey Fursa

13 July 2005 Round of 32 2nd leg	Okean Nakhodka	1 – 2 (1 – 8 agg.)	Spartak Moscow	Nakhodka
19:00 MSK (DST) (UTC+4)	Kochkin 9'; Matviyenko (yellow card) 33'; Lodis (yellow card) 36'; A.Rusinov (yellow card) 63'; Ivchenko (yellow card) 72'	Report	Bazhenov 7' (yellow card) 73'; Samedov (yellow card) 40' (goal) 70'; Pavlenko (yellow card) 63'	Stadium: Vodnik Stadium; Attendance: 7,500; Referee: Sergey Matsyura

Round of 16 took place during the 2006 season.

== Squad statistics ==
As of match played 19 November 2005

=== Appearances and goals ===
No.	Pos	Nat	Player	Total		Premier League		2005-06 Russian Cup	
No.	Pos	Nat	Player	Apps	Goals	Apps	Goals	Apps	Goals
1	GK	(Russia) RUS	Dmitri Khomich	1	0	0	0	1	0
4	MF	(Latvia) LVA	Andrejs Rubins	7	0	0+5	0	2	0
5	DF	(Romania) ROU	Adrian Iencsi	14	1	12+1	1	1	0
7	MF	(Russia) RUS	Denis Boyarintsev	28	4	19+8	4	1	0
8	MF	(Russia) RUS	Dmitri Alenichev	9	0	1+7	0	0+1	0
9	MF	(Russia) RUS	Yegor Titov	29	4	26+2	4	1	0
10	FW	(Russia) RUS	Roman Pavlyuchenko	26	12	16+9	11	1	1
11	MF	(Russia) RUS	Aleksandr Pavlenko	15	2	8+6	2	1	0
13	DF	(Czech Republic) CZE	Martin Jiránek	22	0	22	0	0	0
15	DF	(Czech Republic) CZE	Radoslav Kováč	28	5	27	4	1	1
17	DF	(Argentina) ARG	Clemente Rodríguez	26	2	23+2	1	1	1
18	DF	(Ukraine) UKR	Dmytro Parfenov	2	0	0+2	0	0	0
19	FW	(Argentina) ARG	Fernando Cavenaghi	25	7	20+4	6	1	1
20	DF	(Lithuania) LTU	Ignas Dedura	19	2	18	1	1	1
23	MF	(Russia) RUS	Vladimir Bystrov	15	3	14+1	3	0	0
24	MF	(Brazil) BRA	Mozart	7	0	7	0	0	0
25	MF	(Ukraine) UKR	Maksym Kalynychenko	18	5	10+7	4	1	1
26	DF	(Serbia and Montenegro) SCG	Nemanja Vidić	28	2	27	2	1	0
27	MF	(Moldova) MDA	Serghei Covalciuc	21	2	20+1	2	0	0
28	FW	(Serbia and Montenegro) SCG	Mihajlo Pjanović	17	1	10+7	1	0	0
30	GK	(Poland) POL	Wojciech Kowalewski	29	0	29	0	0	0
32	FW	(Russia) RUS	Nikita Bazhenov	11	2	4+5	1	1+1	1
36	DF	(Russia) RUS	Fyodor Kudryashov	1	0	0	0	1	0
39	MF	(Russia) RUS	Aleksei Rebko	1	0	0	0	1	0
40	FW	(Russia) RUS	Aleksandr Laktionov	1	0	0	0	0+1	0
46	GK	(Russia) RUS	Aleksei Zuev	2	0	1	0	1	0
48	MF	(Russia) RUS	Nikolai Tyunin	1	0	0	0	0+1	0
49	DF	(Russia) RUS	Roman Shishkin	1	0	0	0	1	0
77	DF	(Russia) RUS	Yevgeni Shpedt	1	0	0	0	1	0
Players away from the club on loan:
6	MF	(Romania) ROU	Florin Șoavă	8	0	0+7	0	1	0
Players who appeared for Spartak Moscow but left during the season:
3	DF	(Austria) AUT	Emanuel Pogatetz	11	0	11	0	0	0
14	MF	(Russia) RUS	Aleksandr Samedov	13	1	5+6	0	1+1	1

=== Goal scorers ===
Place	Position	Nation	Number	Name	Premier League	2005-06 Russian Cup	Total
1	FW	(Russia)	10	Roman Pavlyuchenko	11	1	12
2	FW	(Argentina)	19	Fernando Cavenaghi	6	1	7
3	MF	(Ukraine)	25	Maksym Kalynychenko	4	1	5
3	DF	(Czech Republic)	15	Radoslav Kováč	4	1	5
5	MF	(Russia)	7	Denis Boyarintsev	4	0	4
5	MF	(Russia)	9	Yegor Titov	4	0	4
7	MF	(Russia)	23	Vladimir Bystrov	3	0	3
8	MF	(Russia)	11	Aleksandr Pavlenko	2	0	2
8	DF	(Serbia and Montenegro)	26	Nemanja Vidić	2	0	2
8	MF	(Moldova)	27	Serghei Covalciuc	2	0	2
8	DF	(Argentina)	17	Clemente Rodríguez	1	1	2
8	DF	(Lithuania)	20	Ignas Dedura	1	1	2
8	FW	(Russia)	32	Nikita Bazhenov	1	1	2
14	FW	(Serbia and Montenegro)	28	Mihajlo Pjanović	1	0	1
14	DF	(Romania)	5	Adrian Iencsi	1	0	1
14	MF	(Russia)	14	Aleksandr Samedov	0	1	1
TOTALS					47	8	55

=== Clean sheets ===
Place	Position	Nation	Number	Name	Premier League	2005-06 Russian Cup	Total
1	GK	(Poland)	30	Wojciech Kowalewski	11	0	11
2	GK	(Russia)	46	Aleksei Zuev	0	1	1
TOTALS					11	1	12

=== Disciplinary record ===
Number	Nation	Position	Name	Premier League		2005-06 Russian Cup		Total	
Number	Nation	Position	Name	Booked	Sent off (straight red)	Booked	Sent off (straight red)	Booked	Sent off (straight red)
5	(Romania)	DF	Adrian Iencsi	2	0	0	0	2	0
7	(Russia)	MF	Denis Boyarintsev	2	0	0	0	2	0
8	(Russia)	MF	Dmitri Alenichev	2	0	0	0	2	0
9	(Russia)	MF	Yegor Titov	1	0	0	0	1	0
10	(Russia)	FW	Roman Pavlyuchenko	4	0	0	0	4	0
11	(Russia)	MF	Aleksandr Pavlenko	3	0	1	0	4	0
13	(Czech Republic)	DF	Martin Jiránek	1	0	0	0	1	0
15	(Czech Republic)	DF	Radoslav Kováč	8	0	0	0	8	0
17	(Argentina)	DF	Clemente Rodríguez	5	0	0	0	5	0
19	(Argentina)	FW	Fernando Cavenaghi	2	0	0	0	2	0
20	(Lithuania)	DF	Ignas Dedura	4	0	0	0	4	0
23	(Russia)	MF	Vladimir Bystrov	2	0	0	0	2	0
24	(Brazil)	MF	Mozart	3	0	0	0	3	0
25	(Ukraine)	MF	Maksym Kalynychenko	2	0	0	0	2	0
26	(Serbia and Montenegro)	DF	Nemanja Vidić	12	0	0	0	12	0
27	(Moldova)	MF	Serghei Covalciuc	1	0	0	0	1	0
28	(Serbia and Montenegro)	FW	Mihajlo Pjanović	2	0	0	0	2	0
30	(Poland)	GK	Wojciech Kowalewski	4	0	0	0	4	0
32	(Russia)	FW	Nikita Bazhenov	1	0	1	0	2	0
Players away on loan:
Players who left Spartak Moscow season during the season:
3	(Austria)	DF	Emanuel Pogatetz	3	1	0	0	3	1
14	(Russia)	MF	Aleksandr Samedov	0	0	1	0	1	0
Total				64	1	3	0	67	1
