= 2006 FC Spartak Moscow season =

Spartak Moscow
2006 season
- Manager: Aleksandrs Starkovs (until 26 April); Vladimir Fedotov (from 27 April)
- Stadium: Luzhniki Stadium
- Premier League: 2nd
- Russian Cup: Runners-up
- Russian Cup: Progressed to 2007 season
- UEFA Champions League: Progressed to UEFA Cup in 2007 season
- Top goalscorer: League: Roman Pavlyuchenko (18); All: Roman Pavlyuchenko (21)

The 2006 FC Spartak Moscow season was the club's 15th season in the Russian Premier League season. Spartak finished the season in 2nd position, qualifying for the 2006–07 UEFA Champions League Third Qualifying Round. In the 2005–06 Russian Cup, Spartak finished as Runners-up to CSKA Moscow whilst progressing to the Last 16 of the 2006–07 Russian Cup which took place during the 2007 season. In the UEFA Champions League, Spartak reached the Group Stage, facing Bayern Munich, Internazionale and Sporting CP, before finishing third and progressing to the 2006–07 UEFA Cup Round of 32 against Celta Vigo.

== Season events ==
On 26 April, Aleksandrs Starkovs resigned as manager, with Vladimir Fedotov being appointed as his replacement the following day.

== Squad ==
As of match played 5 December 2006

No.	Name	Nationality	Position	Date of birth (age)	Signed from	Signed in	Contract ends	Apps.	Goals
Goalkeepers
1	Dmitri Khomich	(Russia)	Gk	4 October 1984 (aged 22)	Alania Vladikavkaz	2005		5	0
12	Ivan Komissarov	(Russia)	GK	28 May 1988 (aged 18)	Youth Team	2005		0	0
16	Yevgeniy Gubin	(Russia)	GK	25 January 1989 (aged 17)	Youth Team	2005		0	0
30	Wojciech Kowalewski	(Poland)	GK	11 May 1977 (aged 29)	Shakhtar Donetsk	2003	2008	121	0
46	Aleksei Zuev	(Russia)	GK	3 February 1981 (aged 25)	Spartak-Zvezda Shchyolkovo	2001			
Defenders
2	Géder	(Brazil)	DF	23 April 1978 (aged 28)	Saturn Ramenskoye	2006		14	0
3	Martin Stranzl	(Austria)	DF	16 June 1980 (aged 26)	VfB Stuttgart	2006		39	0
13	Martin Jiránek	(Czech Republic)	DF	25 May 1979 (aged 27)	Reggina	2004		74	2
15	Radoslav Kováč	(Czech Republic)	DF	27 November 1979 (aged 27)	Sparta Prague	2005		70	10
17	Clemente Rodríguez	(Argentina)	DF	31 July 1981 (aged 25)	Boca Juniors	2004		67	3
20	Ignas Dedura	(Lithuania)	DF	6 January 1978 (aged 28)	Skonto	2004		29	2
33	Ilya Gultyayev	(Russia)	DF	5 September 1988 (aged 18)	Youth Team	2006		0	0
35	Sergei Kabanov	(Russia)	DF	15 March 1986 (aged 20)	Youth Team	2002		3	0
36	Fyodor Kudryashov	(Russia)	DF	5 April 1987 (aged 19)	Sibiryak Bratsk	2005		2	0
38	Yevgeny Krug	(Russia)	DF	20 April 1986 (aged 20)	Chkalovets-Olimpik Novosibirsk	2005		0	0
47	Aleksei Yefimtsev	(Russia)	DF	5 February 1986 (aged 20)	Youth Team	2006		0	0
49	Roman Shishkin	(Russia)	DF	27 January 1987 (aged 19)	Youth Team	2004		31	1
59	Andrei Ivanov	(Russia)	DF	8 October 1988 (aged 18)	Youth Team	2006		1	0
77	Yevgeni Shpedt	(Russia)	DF	26 January 1986 (aged 20)	Chkalovets-Olimpik Novosibirsk	2005	2007 (+2)	2	0
Midfielders
7	Denis Boyarintsev	(Russia)	MF	6 February 1978 (aged 28)	Rubin Kazan	2005		61	9
9	Yegor Titov	(Russia)	MF	29 May 1976 (aged 30)	Youth Team	1995		391	93
11	Aleksandr Pavlenko	(Russia)	MF	20 January 1985 (aged 21)	Lausanne-Sport	2001		110	10
14	Dmitri Torbinski	(Russia)	MF	28 April 1984 (aged 22)	Youth Team	2001		36	0
23	Vladimir Bystrov	(Russia)	MF	31 January 1984 (aged 22)	Zenit St.Petersburg	2005	2008	57	10
24	Mozart	(Brazil)	MF	8 November 1980 (aged 26)	Reggina	2005		45	7
25	Maksym Kalynychenko	(Ukraine)	MF	26 January 1979 (aged 27)	Dnipro Dnipropetrovsk	2000		160	27
27	Serghei Covalciuc	(Moldova)	MF	20 January 1982 (aged 24)	Karpaty Lviv	2004		56	2
37	Yehor Luhachov	(Ukraine)	MF	24 December 1988 (aged 17)	Lokomotyv Kyiv	2006		0	0
39	Aleksei Rebko	(Russia)	MF	23 April 1986 (aged 20)	Youth Team	2001		17	0
42	Amir Bazhev	(Russia)	MF	15 October 1988 (aged 18)	Youth Team	2006		0	0
Forwards
10	Roman Pavlyuchenko	(Russia)	FW	15 December 1981 (aged 24)	Rotor Volgograd	2003		136	60
18	Mihajlo Pjanović	(Serbia)	FW	13 February 1977 (aged 29)	Red Star Belgrade	2003	2007	62	17
19	Fernando Cavenaghi	(Argentina)	FW	21 September 1983 (aged 23)	River Plate	2004		60	17
21	Quincy Owusu-Abeyie	(Netherlands)	FW	15 April 1986 (aged 20)	Arsenal	2006		24	1
32	Nikita Bazhenov	(Russia)	FW	1 February 1985 (aged 21)	Saturn Ramenskoye	2004		43	6
40	Artem Dzyuba	(Russia)	FW	22 August 1988 (aged 18)	Youth Team	2006		8	0
58	Artyom Fomin	(Russia)	FW	8 July 1988 (aged 18)	Youth Team	2006		0	0
Away on loan
4	Gabriel Tamaș	(Romania)	DF	5 November 1983 (aged 23)	Galatasaray	2004	2007	24	0
6	Florin Șoavă	(Romania)	MF	24 July 1978 (aged 28)	Rapid București	2004	2008	42	1
40	Aleksandr Laktionov	(Russia)	FW	28 May 1986 (aged 20)	Youth Team	2005		1	0
	Aleksei Solosin	(Russia)	GK	11 August 1987 (aged 19)	Youth Team	2004		0	0
	Aleš Urbánek	(Czech Republic)	MF	25 May 1980 (aged 26)	Sigma Olomouc	2004	2007	8	0
	Andrejs Rubins	(Latvia)	MF	26 November 1978 (aged 28)	Shinnik Yaroslavl	2005	2008	7	0
Players that left Spartak Moscow during the season
5	Adrian Iencsi	(Romania)	DF	15 March 1975 (aged 31)	Rapid București	2004	2006	48	2
8	Dmitri Alenichev	(Russia)	MF	20 December 1972 (aged 33)	Porto	2004		195	31
37	Tarmo Kink	(Estonia)	FW	6 October 1985 (aged 21)	Real Tallinn	2003		6	0

=== On loan ===
Note: Flags indicate national team as defined under FIFA eligibility rules; some limited exceptions apply. Players may hold more than one non-FIFA nationality.

No.	Pos.	Nation	Player
4	DF	ROU	Gabriel Tamaș (at Celta Vigo)
6	MF	ROU	Florin Șoavă (at Krylia Sovetov)
40	FW	RUS	Aleksandr Laktionov (at Aktobe)

No.	Pos.	Nation	Player
—	GK	RUS	Aleksei Solosin (at Fakel Voronezh)
—	MF	CZE	Aleš Urbánek (at Slavia Prague)
—	MF	LAT	Andrejs Rubins (at Shinnik Yaroslavl)

=== Left club during season ===
Note: Flags indicate national team as defined under FIFA eligibility rules; some limited exceptions apply. Players may hold more than one non-FIFA nationality.

No.	Pos.	Nation	Player
5	DF	ROU	Adrian Iencsi (to Ceahlăul)
8	MF	RUS	Dmitri Alenichev (Retired)

No.	Pos.	Nation	Player
37	FW	EST	Tarmo Kink (to Levadia Tallinn)

== Transfers ==
=== In ===
Date	Position	Nationality	Name	From	Fee	Ref.
31 January 2006	FW	(Netherlands)	Quincy Owusu-Abeyie	Arsenal	Undisclosed	
14 March 2006	DF	(Austria)	Martin Stranzl	VfB Stuttgart	Undisclosed	
25 August 2006	DF	(Brazil)	Géder	Saturn Ramenskoye	Undisclosed	

=== Out ===
Date	Position	Nationality	Name	To	Fee	Ref.
Winter 2006	DF	(Cameroon)	Luc Zoa	Anzhi Makhachkala	Undisclosed	
Winter 2006	FW	(Russia)	Pavel Pogrebnyak	Tom Tomsk	€2,000,000	
5 January 2006	DF	(Serbia and Montenegro)	Nemanja Vidić	Manchester United	Undisclosed	

=== Loans out ===
Date from	Position	Nationality	Name	To	Date to	Ref.
Winter 2006	GK	(Russia)	Aleksei Solosin	Fakel Voronezh	End of Season	
Winter 2006	MF	(Latvia)	Andrejs Rubins	Shinnik Yaroslavl	End of Season	
Winter 2006	MF	(Romania)	Florin Șoavă	Krylia Sovetov	End of Season	
Winter 2006	FW	(Russia)	Aleksandr Laktionov	Aktobe	End of Season	
Summer 2006	DF	(Romania)	Gabriel Tamaș	Celta Vigo	Summer 2007	
Summer 2006	MF	(Czech Republic)	Aleš Urbánek	Artmedia Petržalka	Summer 2007	

=== Released ===
Date	Position	Nationality	Name	Joined	Date
10 September 2006	MF	(Russia)	Dmitri Alenichev	Retired	
31 December 2006	GK	(Russia)	Aleksei Solosin	Saturn Ramenskoye	
31 December 2006	GK	(Russia)	Aleksei Zuev	Avangard Podolsk	2008
31 December 2006	DF	(Russia)	Sergei Kabanov	Alania Vladikavkaz	
31 December 2006	FW	(Serbia)	Mihajlo Pjanović	Rostov	

== Competitions ==
=== Premier League ===
==== Results by round ====
Round	1	2	3	4	5	6	7	8	9	10	11	12	13	14	15	16	17	18	19	20	21	22	23	24	25	26	27	28	29	30
Ground	H	A	H	H	A	H	A	H	A	H	A	H	A	H	H	A	H	A	A	H	A	H	A	H	A	H	A	H	A	A
Result	D	D	D	W	L	D	W	W	D	W	D	D	W	W	W	L	W	D	D	W	D	W	D	W	D	W	D	W	W	W

Updated to match(es) played on 26 November 2006. Source: See Results
A = Away; H = Home; W = Win; D = Draw; L = Loss

==== Results ====
19 March 2006 1	Spartak Moscow	1 – 1	Luch-Energiya Vladivostok	Moscow
18:00 MSK (UTC+3)	Rodríguez (yellow card) 10'; Titov (yellow card) 66'; Pavlyuchenko (yellow card) 68'; Bystrov 90+'	Report	Astafyev (yellow card) 5' (goal) 55'; Cherkes (yellow card) 88'; Gerus (yellow card) 89'	Stadium: Luzhniki Stadium; Attendance: 15,000; Referee: Vladimir Pettay

26 March 2006 2	Spartak Nalchik	2 – 2	Spartak Moscow	Nalchik
17:00 MSK (UTC+3)	Džudović 26' (yellow card) 53'; Pylypchuk 55' (yellow card) 57'; Bitokov (yellow card) 64'	Report	Mozart (yellow card) 35'; Kalynychenko 39'; Iencsi (yellow card) 41'; Pavlyuchenko (yellow card) 58'; Pjanović (yellow card) 62' (goal) 84'; Titov (yellow card) 64'	Stadium: Spartak Stadium; Attendance: 15,000; Referee: Alexander Evstigneev

1 April 2006 3	Spartak Moscow	1 – 1	CSKA Moscow	Moscow
14:00 MSK (DST) (UTC+4)	Kováč (yellow card) 30'; Titov 63'; Pavlenko (yellow card) 84'	Report	Aldonin (yellow card) 7'; Rahimić (yellow card) 50'; Vágner Love 59'; Akinfeev (red card) 61'	Stadium: Luzhniki Stadium; Attendance: 55,000; Referee: Massimo De Santis

9 April 2006 4	Spartak Moscow	2 – 1	Lokomotiv Moscow	Moscow
16:00 MSK (DST) (UTC+4)	Bystrov (yellow card) 8' (goal) 24'; Kováč (yellow card) 29'; Titov 70'; Kalynychenko (yellow card) 78'	Report	Pavlyuchenko 7' (o.g.); Kingston (yellow card) 27'; Ivanović (yellow card) 35'; Zouaghi (yellow card) 81'	Stadium: Luzhniki Stadium; Attendance: 28,000; Referee: Igor Zakharov

16 April 2006 5	Rubin Kazan	2 – 0	Spartak Moscow	Kazan
16:00 MSK (DST) (UTC+4)	Bukharov 27', 55'; Calisto (yellow card) 27'; Gațcan (yellow card) 30'	Report	Bystrov (yellow card) 9'; Mozart (yellow card) 54'; Stranzl (yellow card) 78'	Stadium: Central Stadium; Attendance: 25,000; Referee: Nikolai Ivanov

23 April 2006 6	Spartak Moscow	3 – 3	FC Moscow	Moscow
14:00 MSK (DST) (UTC+4)	Mozart 8' (pen.) (penalty missed) 14' (yellow card) 90+'; Bazhenov 20'; Titov 39'; Kováč (yellow card) 55'	Report	Kuzmin (yellow card) 51'; Kirichenko 61' (pen.); Semak 63'; Jop (yellow card) 69'; Čížek 82'; Adamov (yellow card) 90+'	Stadium: Luzhniki Stadium; Attendance: 15,000; Referee: Yuri Baskakov

30 April 2006 7	Zenit St.Petersburg	1 – 4	Spartak Moscow	Saint Petersburg
14:00 MSK (DST) (UTC+4)	Covalciuc 3' (o.g.); Šírl (yellow card) 15'; Radimov (yellow card) 38'; Škrtel (yellow card) 59'	Report	Covalciuc (yellow card) 27'; Pavlyuchenko 35' (pen.); Pjanović 46', 72'; Bazhenov 75'; Kowalewski (yellow card) 84'	Stadium: Petrovsky Stadium; Attendance: 21,700; Referee: Alexander Gonchar

7 May 2006 8	Spartak Moscow	2 – 0	Torpedo Moscow	Moscow
16:00 MSK (DST) (UTC+4)	Bazhenov 34'; Iencsi (yellow card) 45'; Mozart (yellow card) 68'; Stranzl (yellow card) 80'; Pavlyuchenko 86'	Report		Stadium: Luzhniki Stadium; Attendance: 15,000; Referee: Aleksandr Kolobaev

15 May 2006 9	Dynamo Moscow	0 – 0	Spartak Moscow	Moscow
19:00 MSK (DST) (UTC+4)	Fernández (yellow card) 35'; Jean (yellow card) 39'; Kolodin (yellow card) 73'	Report	Tamaș (yellow card) 18'; Kováč (yellow card) 49'; Torbinski (yellow card) 72' (yellow-red card) 86'	Stadium: Dynamo Stadium; Attendance: 20,000; Referee: Aleksei Nikolaev

12 July 2006 10	Spartak Moscow	3 – 1	Shinnik Yaroslavl	Moscow
19:00 MSK (DST) (UTC+4)	Titov 23'; Pavlyuchenko 34'; Rodríguez (yellow card) 73'; Owusu-Abeyie 81'	Report	Shirko 53' (yellow card) 65'; Radosavljević (yellow card) 70'	Stadium: Luzhniki Stadium; Attendance: 10,000; Referee: Eduard Malyi

16 July 2006 11	Tom Tomsk	2 – 2	Spartak Moscow	Tomsk
16:00 MSK (DST) (UTC+4)	Pogrebnyak 38'; Kaleshin (yellow card) 73'; Krunić 88' (pen.); Bugayev (yellow card) 89'	Report	Pavlyuchenko 6' (pen.) (yellow card) 45' (yellow-red card) 53'; Cavenaghi 14'; Stranzl (yellow card) 36'; Kowalewski (yellow card) 81'; Bystrov (yellow card) 88'; Owusu-Abeyie (yellow card) 90+'	Stadium: Trud Stadium; Attendance: 15,000; Referee: Pavel Kulalaev

21 July 2006 12	Spartak Moscow	1 – 1	Saturn Ramenskoye	Moscow
19:00 MSK (DST) (UTC+4)	Kováč (yellow card) 37' (yellow-red card) 88'; Jiránek 78'	Report	Petráš (yellow card) 72'; Eremenko 86'	Stadium: Luzhniki Stadium; Attendance: 10,000; Referee: Aleksandr Gvardis

29 July 2006 13	Amkar Perm	1 – 3	Spartak Moscow	Perm
16:00 MSK (DST) (UTC+4)	Savin 31' (pen.) (yellow card) 71'; Belorukov (yellow card) 44'; Kobenko (yellow card) 67'; Volkov (yellow card) 71'; Kushev (yellow card) 78'; Akhmetzyanov (yellow card) 82'	Report	Bystrov 26' (yellow card) 63'; Iencsi (yellow card) 30'; Kalynychenko 33' (yellow card) 78'; Cavenaghi (yellow card) 40' (goal) 64'	Stadium: Zvezda Stadium; Attendance: 18,000; Referee: Sergey Fursa

5 August 2006 14	Spartak Moscow	5 – 2	Rostov	Moscow
14:00 MSK (DST) (UTC+4)	Stranzl (yellow card) 8'; Bystrov 13'; Pavlyuchenko 24', 30'; Cavenaghi 33'; Rodríguez 38' (yellow card) 56'	Report	Biletskyi (yellow card) 9'; Kalachev (yellow card) 22'; Laizāns (yellow card) 25'; Osinov 45+' (pen.), 81' (pen.)	Stadium: Luzhniki Stadium; Attendance: 6,000; Referee: Alexander Gonchar

13 August 2006 15	Spartak Moscow	3 – 2	Krylia Sovetov	Moscow
17:00 MSK (DST) (UTC+4)	Mozart 3'; Cavenaghi 46'; Kováč 70'; Pavlyuchenko (yellow card) 88'	Report	Mujiri 42'; Skvernyuk 69'	Stadium: Luzhniki Stadium; Attendance: 15,000; Referee: Vladimir Pettay

19 August 2006 16	Luch-Energiya Vladivostok	1 – 0	Spartak Moscow	Vladivostok
12:00 VLAT (UTC+10)	Tikhonovetsky (yellow card) 28'; Arkhipov (yellow card) 45'; Semochko (yellow card) 55'; Monaryov 87'	Report	Shpedt (yellow card) 57'; Rodríguez (yellow card) 90+'	Stadium: Dynamo Stadium; Attendance: 10,000; Referee: Toru Kamikawa

27 August 2006 17	Spartak Moscow	1 – 0	Spartak Nalchik	Moscow
14:00 MSK (DST) (UTC+4)	Jiránek (yellow card) 28'; Cavenaghi (penalty missed) 50'; Kováč (yellow card) 53'; Boyarintsev 90+' (yellow card) 90+'	Report	Bitokov (yellow card) 9'; Mostovyi (yellow card) 49'; Kisenkov (yellow card) 50'; Kudayev (yellow card) 50'; Poroshyn (yellow card) 85'	Stadium: Luzhniki Stadium; Attendance: 14,000; Referee: Sergey Fursa

9 September 2006 18	CSKA Moscow	2 – 2	Spartak Moscow	Moscow
16:00 MSK (DST) (UTC+4)	Carvalho 27'; Olić 63' (yellow card) 64'; Zhirkov (yellow card) 84'; Dudu (yellow card) 88'	Report	Stranzl (yellow card) 26'; Jiránek 35'; Kováč (yellow card) 38'; Cavenaghi (yellow card) 41'; Pavlyuchenko 81'	Stadium: Dynamo Stadium; Attendance: 36,000; Referee: Laurent Duhamel

17 September 2006 19	Lokomotiv Moscow	0 – 0	Spartak Moscow	Moscow
14:00 MSK (DST) (UTC+4)	O'Connor (yellow card) 29'; Loskov (yellow card) 80'; Spahić (yellow card) 83'; Asatiani (yellow card) 90'	Report	Géder (yellow card) 81'; Rodríguez (yellow card) 87'	Stadium: Lokomotiv Stadium; Attendance: 28,023; Referee: Yuri Baskakov

23 September 2006 20	Spartak Moscow	3 – 0	Rubin Kazan	Moscow
19:00 MSK (DST) (UTC+4)	Bazhenov (yellow card) 21'; Pavlyuchenko 45' (pen.) (yellow card) 84'; Bystrov 50'; Titov 54'; Jiránek (yellow card) 73'	Report	Fyodorov (yellow card) 3'; Gațcan (yellow card) 5'; Gabriel (yellow card) 87'	Stadium: Luzhniki Stadium; Attendance: 10,232; Referee: Igor Egorov

1 October 2006 21	FC Moscow	3 – 3	Spartak Moscow	Moscow
14:00 MSK (DST) (UTC+4)	Semak (yellow card) 26' (goal) 87'; Barrientos (yellow card) 38'; Melyoshin (yellow card) 43'; Godunok (yellow card) 57'; Adamov 68', 74' (pen.); Okoronkwo (yellow card) 75'	Report	Géder (yellow card) 30'; Pavlyuchenko 35'; Kowalewski (yellow card) 38'; Shishkin (yellow card) 49' (goal) 66'; Kováč 76'	Stadium: Eduard Streltsov Stadium; Attendance: 10,000; Referee: Alexey Nikolaev

14 October 2006 22	Spartak Moscow	1 – 0	Zenit St.Petersburg	Moscow
16:00 MSK (DST) (UTC+4)	Géder (yellow card) 75'; Bystrov 90'	Report	Šírl (yellow card) 83'	Stadium: Luzhniki Stadium; Attendance: 35,000; Referee: Vladimir Pettay

21 October 2006 23	Torpedo Moscow	1 – 1	Spartak Moscow	Moscow
MSK (DST) (UTC+4)	Jääger (yellow card) 28'; Florescu (yellow card) 48'; Jokić (yellow card) 57'; Budylin 90'	Report	Jiránek (yellow card) 54'; Pavlyuchenko 61'; Torbinski (yellow card) 65'; Cavenaghi (yellow card) 71'	Stadium: Luzhniki Stadium; Attendance: 15,000; Referee: Igor Zakharov

25 October 2006 24	Spartak Moscow	3 – 2	Dynamo Moscow	Moscow
19:00 MSK (DST) (UTC+4)	Pavlyuchenko 20'; Géder (yellow card) 45' (yellow-red card) 51'; Mozart (yellow card) 51' (goal) 80' (pen.); Cavenaghi (yellow card) 54'; Titov (yellow card) 61'; Boyarintsev 75' (yellow card) 87'	Report	Fernández (yellow card) 19'; Danny 35'; Derlei 58'; Jean (yellow card) 68' (yellow-red card) 78'; Khokhlov (yellow card) 82'	Stadium: Luzhniki Stadium; Attendance: 16,000; Referee: Yuri Baskakov

28 October 2006 25	Shinnik Yaroslavl	1 – 1	Spartak Moscow	Yaroslavl
17:00 MSK (DST) (UTC+4)	Romanovich (yellow card) 16'; Amelyanchuk 90'	Report	Pavlyuchenko 7'; Rodríguez (yellow card) 31'; Jiránek (yellow card) 78'; Dzyuba (yellow card) 89'	Stadium: Shinnik Stadium; Attendance: 16,000; Referee: Alexander Evstigneev

5 November 2006 26	Spartak Moscow	3 – 1	Tom Tomsk	Moscow
MSK (UTC+3)	Mozart 34'; Pavlyuchenko 42' (pen.) (yellow card) 66'; Pavlenko 88'	Report	Pogrebnyak (yellow card) 21'; Klimov 36'; Yanotovsky (yellow card) 50' (yellow-red card) 85'; Mladenov (yellow card) 81'	Stadium: Luzhniki Stadium; Attendance: 11,000; Referee: Stanislav Sukhina

8 November 2006 27	Saturn Ramenskoye	1 – 1	Spartak Moscow	Ramenskoye
19:00 MSK (UTC+3)	Gyan (yellow card) 25' (red card) 90'; Ďurica (yellow card) 86'; Lebedenko 90'; Jakubko (yellow card) 90'	Report	Mozart (yellow card) 49'; Shishkin (yellow card) 55'; Covalciuc (yellow card) 65'; Kalynychenko (yellow card) 75' (goal) 85'	Stadium: Saturn Stadium; Attendance: 15,500; Referee: Aleksandr Gvardis

13 November 2006 28	Spartak Moscow	4 – 1	Amkar Perm	Moscow
MSK (UTC+3)	Pavlyuchenko 23', 40'; Rodríguez (yellow card) 36'; Cavenaghi 38'; Titov 87'	Report	Kushev 18'; Ziyati (yellow card) 33'	Stadium: Luzhniki Stadium; Attendance: 13,000; Referee: Stanislav Sukhina

18 November 2006 29	Rostov	3 – 4	Spartak Moscow	Rostov-on-Don
14:00 MSK (UTC+3)	Laizāns 8'; Orlov (yellow card) 12'; Tanasijević (yellow card) 20'; Kruščić 24'; Osinov 65' (pen.)	Report	Titov 21', 39'; Mozart (yellow card) 36'; Shishkin (yellow card) 54'; Pavlyuchenko 62', 82'; Bystrov (yellow card) 70'	Stadium: Olimp-2; Attendance: 9,000; Referee: Igor Egorov

26 November 2006 30	Krylia Sovetov	0 – 1	Spartak Moscow	Samara
16:00 MSK (UTC+3)	Bobyor (yellow card) 81'; Medvedev (yellow card) 81'	Report	Pavlyuchenko 20'; Kováč (yellow card) 31'	Stadium: Metallurg Stadium; Attendance: 15,000; Referee: Sergey Timofeev

==== League table ====
Pos	Team	Pld	W	D	L	GF	GA	GD	Pts	Qualification or relegation
1	CSKA Moscow (C)	30	17	7	6	47	28	+19	58	Qualification to Champions League group stage
2	Spartak Moscow	30	15	13	2	60	36	+24	58	Qualification to Champions League third qualifying round
3	Lokomotiv Moscow	30	15	8	7	47	34	+13	53	Qualification to UEFA Cup first round (Note: Qualified as the winner of 2006–07 Russian Cup.)
4	Zenit St. Petersburg	30	13	11	6	42	30	+12	50	Qualification to UEFA Cup second qualifying round
5	Rubin Kazan	30	14	7	9	45	35	+10	49	Qualification to Intertoto Cup second round

Source: RFPL
Rules for classification: 1st points; 2nd matches won; 3rd goal difference; 4th head-to-head (points, matches won, goal difference, goals scored, away goals scored); 5th goals scored; 6th away goals scored; 7th drawing of lots
(C) Champions

=== Russian Cup ===
==== 2005-06 ====
5 March 2006 Round of 16 1st leg	Luch-Energiya Vladivostok	0 – 1	Spartak Moscow	Moscow
17:00 MSK (UTC+3)	Sheshukov (yellow card) 48'; Cherkes (yellow card) 85'	Report	Cavenaghi 5'	Stadium: Luzhniki Stadium; Attendance: 8,000; Referee: Aleksandr Gvardis
Note: Match played at the Luzhniki Stadium in Moscow, instead of Luch-Energiya Vladivostok's regular Dynamo Stadium in Vladivostok.

14 March 2006 Round of 16 2nd leg	Spartak Moscow	1 – 0 (2 – 0 agg.)	Luch-Energiya Vladivostok	Moscow
18:00 MSK (UTC+3)	Bystrov (yellow card) 16'; Cavenaghi 46'	Report	D.N.Smirnov (yellow card) 20'; Astafyev 32'	Stadium: Luzhniki Stadium; Attendance: 7,000; Referee: Stanislav Sukhina

22 March 2006 Quarterfinal 1st leg	Spartak Moscow	2 – 2	Lokomotiv Moscow	Moscow
18:00 MSK (UTC+3)	Kováč 65'; Pjanović 69'; Mozart (yellow card) 87'	Report	O'Connor 21'; Loskov 27' (pen.); Bikey (yellow card) 68'	Stadium: Luzhniki Stadium; Attendance: 15,000; Referee: Aleksei Nikolaev

12 April 2006 Quarterfinal 2nd leg	Lokomotiv Moscow	1 – 2 (3 – 4 agg.)	Spartak Moscow	Moscow
19:00 MSK (DST) (UTC+4)	Bilyaletdinov 10'; Evseev (yellow card) 86'	Report	Pjanović 15'; Rodríguez (yellow card) 24'; Mozart 86' (pen.)	Stadium: Lokomotiv Stadium; Attendance: 19,000; Referee: Almir Kayumov

3 May 2006 Semifinal 1st leg	Spartak Moscow	1 – 1	Saturn Ramenskoye	Moscow
19:30 MSK (DST) (UTC+4)	Cavenaghi 16'; Mozart (yellow card) 63'; Bazhenov (yellow card) 89'	Report	Džiaukštas (yellow card) 15'; Bareiro (yellow card) 59'; Géder (yellow card) 64'; Polovinchuk (yellow card) 79'; Sabitov 85'	Stadium: Luzhniki Stadium; Attendance: 9,000; Referee: Sergey Fursa

10 May 2006 Semifinal 2nd leg	Saturn Ramenskoye	1 – 3 (2 – 4 agg.)	Spartak Moscow	Ramenskoye
16:00 MSK (DST) (UTC+4)	Petráš (yellow card) 11'; Polovinchuk (yellow card) 16'; Igonin (yellow card) 54'; Bareiro 60' (penalty missed) 90+'; Vukčević (yellow card) 75'	Report	Stranzl (yellow card) 6'; Mozart (yellow card) 11' (goal) 64' (pen.); Cavenaghi 45'; Rodríguez (yellow card) 73'; Pavlenko 83'	Stadium: Saturn Stadium; Attendance: 16,200; Referee: Vladimir Pettay

===== Final =====
20 May 2006	CSKA Moscow	3 – 0	Spartak Moscow	Moscow
14:00 MSK (DST) (UTC+4)	Jô 43', 90+3'; Zhirkov (yellow card) 57'; Aldonin (yellow card) 62'; Vágner Love (yellow card) 72' (goal) 90'	Report	Rodríguez (yellow card) 37'; Pavlyuchenko (yellow card) 47'; Kowalewski (yellow card) 70'; Stranzl (yellow card) 83'; Mozart (red card) 88'	Stadium: Luzhniki Stadium; Attendance: 67,000; Referee: Valentin Ivanov

==== 2006-07 ====
2 July 2006 Round of 32 1st leg	Ural Sverdlovsk Oblast	0 – 1	Spartak Moscow	Yekaterinburg
17:00 MSK (DST) (UTC+4)	Bakhtin (yellow card) 89'	Report	Pavlenko 70'; Jiránek (yellow card) 88'	Stadium: Uralamash Stadium; Attendance: 13,000; Referee: Aleksandr Evstigneev

20 September 2006 Round of 32 2nd leg	Spartak Moscow	2 – 2 (3 – 2 agg.)	Ural Sverdlovsk Oblast	Moscow
19:00 MSK (DST) (UTC+4)	Kalynychenko (yellow card) 36'; Bystrov 90'; Boyarintsev 90+3'; Géder (yellow card) 90+'	Report	Katulsky (yellow card) 37'; Fidler 46' (yellow card) 86'; Mysin 69'	Stadium: Luzhniki Stadium; Attendance: 3,400; Referee: Aleksandr Gvardis

Round of 16 took place during the 2007 season.

=== UEFA Champions League ===
==== Qualifying rounds ====
26 July 2006 Second Qualifying Round 1st leg	Sheriff Tiraspol (Moldova)	1 – 1	(Russia) Spartak Moscow	Tiraspol, Moldova
21:00 MSK (DST) (UTC+4)	Gnanou (yellow card) 3'; Arbănaș (yellow card) 48'; Epureanu (yellow card) 67'; Omotoyossi 90+2'	Report	Kováč 77'	Stadium: Sheriff Stadium; Attendance: 12,000; Referee: Robert Małek (Poland)

2 August 2006 Second Qualifying Round 2nd leg	Spartak Moscow (Russia)	0 – 0 (1 – 1 agg.)	(Moldova) Sheriff Tiraspol	Moscow, Russia
19:00 MSK (DST) (UTC+4)	Pavlyuchenko (yellow card) 51'; Cavenaghi (yellow card) 90'	Report	M.Pirsa (yellow card) 56'; Humenyuk (yellow card) 74'	Stadium: Luzhniki Stadium; Attendance: 22,000; Referee: Serge Gumienny (Belgium)

9 August 2006 Third Qualifying Round 1st leg	Slovan Liberec (Czech Republic)	0 – 0	(Russia) Spartak Moscow	Liberec, Slovenia
22:15 MSK (DST) (UTC+4)	Bílek (yellow card) 16'; Košťál (yellow card) 84'	Report	Kováč (yellow card) 28'; Kalynychenko (yellow card) 63'	Stadium: Stadion u Nisy; Attendance: 8,130; Referee: Craig Thomson (Scotland)

23 August 2006 Third Qualifying Round 2nd leg	Spartak Moscow (Russia)	2 – 1 (2 – 1 agg.)	(Czech Republic) Slovan Liberec	Moscow, Russia
19:00 MSK (DST) (UTC+4)	Mozart 23' (yellow card) 74'; Jiránek (yellow card) 72'; Pavlyuchenko 79'; Kalynychenko (yellow card) 85'	Report	Zápotočný (yellow card) (yellow-red card) 57'; Košťál (yellow card) 66'; Hodúr 73' (pen.); Pudil (yellow card) 85'	Stadium: Luzhniki Stadium; Attendance: 35,000; Referee: Luis Medina Cantalejo (Spain)

==== Group stage ====
Team	Pld	W	D	L	GF	GA	GD	Pts
(Germany) Bayern Munich	6	3	3	0	10	3	+7	12
(Italy) Internazionale	6	3	1	2	5	5	0	10
(Russia) Spartak Moscow	6	1	2	3	7	11	−4	5
(Portugal) Sporting CP	6	1	2	3	3	6	−3	5

12 September 2006 1	Bayern Munich (Germany)	4 – 0	(Russia) Spartak Moscow	Munich, Germany
22:45 MSK (DST) (UTC+4)	Lúcio (yellow card) 40'; Pizarro 48'; Santa Cruz 52'; Schweinsteiger 71'; Salihamidžić 84'	Report	Bystrov (yellow card) 28'	Stadium: Allianz Arena; Attendance: 63,000; Referee: Alberto Undiano Mallenco (Spain)

27 September 2006 2	Spartak Moscow (Russia)	1 – 1	(Portugal) Sporting CP	Moscow, Russia
20:30 MSK (DST) (UTC+4)	Boyarintsev 5'; Stranzl (yellow card) 80'	Report	Tonel (yellow card) 10'; Veloso (yellow card) 19'; Nani 59'	Stadium: Luzhniki Stadium; Attendance: 38,000; Referee: Martin Hansson (Sweden)

18 October 2006 3	Internazionale (Italy)	2 – 1	(Russia) Spartak Moscow	Milan, Italy
22:45 MSK (DST) (UTC+4)	Cruz 1', 9'; Rodríguez (yellow card) 32'; Figo (yellow card) 33'	Report	Pavlyuchenko 54'; Kalynychenko (yellow card) 81'	Stadium: San Siro; Attendance: 40,000; Referee: Bertrand Layec (France)

31 October 2006 4	Spartak Moscow (Russia)	0 – 1	(Italy) Internazionale	Moscow, Russia
20:30 MSK (UTC+3)		Report	Cruz 2'	Stadium: Luzhniki Stadium; Attendance: 60,001; Referee: Claus Bo Larsen (Denmark)

22 November 2006 5	Spartak Moscow (Russia)	2 – 2	(Germany) Bayern Munich	Moscow, Russia
20:30 MSK (UTC+3)	Kalynychenko 16'; Mozart (yellow card) 16'; Kováč 72'; Géder (yellow card) 48'; Bystrov (yellow card) 79'	Report	Polga (yellow card) 21'; Pizarro 22', 39'	Stadium: Luzhniki Stadium; Attendance: 40,000; Referee: Grzegorz Gilewski (Poland)

5 December 2006 6	Sporting CP (Portugal)	1 – 3	(Russia) Spartak Moscow	Lisbon, Portugal
22:45 MSK (UTC+3)	Bueno 31'	Report	Pavlyuchenko 7'; Kalynychenko 16'; Zuev (yellow card) 44'; Boyarintsev 89'	Stadium: Estádio José Alvalade; Attendance: 30,000; Referee: Nicolai Vollquartz (Denmark)

== Squad statistics ==
As of match played 5 December 2006

=== Appearances and goals ===
No.	Pos	Nat	Player	Total		Premier League		2005-06 Russian Cup		2006-07 Russian Cup		UEFA Champions League	
No.	Pos	Nat	Player	Apps	Goals	Apps	Goals	Apps	Goals	Apps	Goals	Apps	Goals
1	GK	(Russia) RUS	Dmitri Khomich	4	0	2+1	0	0	0	1	0	0	0
2	DF	(Brazil) BRA	Géder	14	0	8	0	0	0	1	0	5	0
3	DF	(Austria) AUT	Martin Stranzl	39	0	23+2	0	4	0	1	0	9	0
7	MF	(Russia) RUS	Denis Boyarintsev	33	5	14+8	2	4+1	0	1	1	3+2	2
9	MF	(Russia) RUS	Yegor Titov	41	8	25	8	6	0	1+1	0	8	0
10	FW	(Russia) RUS	Roman Pavlyuchenko	43	21	24+3	18	4	0	1+1	0	10	3
11	MF	(Russia) RUS	Aleksandr Pavlenko	15	3	3+9	1	0+2	1	0+1	1	0	0
13	DF	(Czech Republic) CZE	Martin Jiránek	40	2	26	2	3	0	1	0	10	0
14	MF	(Russia) RUS	Dmitri Torbinski	17	0	5+7	0	1	0	1	0	0+3	0
15	DF	(Czech Republic) CZE	Radoslav Kováč	42	5	27	2	5	1	0	0	10	2
17	DF	(Argentina) ARG	Clemente Rodríguez	32	1	18+2	1	5	0	0	0	7	0
18	FW	(Serbia) SRB	Mihajlo Pjanović	14	5	7+1	3	1+4	2	0	0	1	0
19	FW	(Argentina) ARG	Fernando Cavenaghi	26	9	13+3	5	5+1	4	0	0	3+1	0
20	DF	(Lithuania) LTU	Ignas Dedura	2	0	0	0	2	0	0	0	0	0
21	FW	(Netherlands) NED	Quincy Owusu-Abeyie	24	1	6+9	1	1+2	0	1	0	0+5	0
23	MF	(Russia) RUS	Vladimir Bystrov	42	7	21+3	6	4+3	0	1+1	1	9	0
24	MF	(Brazil) BRA	Mozart	38	7	22	4	6	2	0	0	10	1
25	MF	(Ukraine) UKR	Maksym Kalynychenko	27	5	7+8	3	4+1	0	1	0	4+2	2
27	MF	(Moldova) MDA	Serghei Covalciuc	35	0	16+6	0	5+1	0	1	0	4+2	0
30	GK	(Poland) POL	Wojciech Kowalewski	41	0	27	0	5	0	1	0	8	0
32	FW	(Russia) RUS	Nikita Bazhenov	20	3	6+5	3	2+1	0	2	0	0+4	0
35	DF	(Russia) RUS	Sergei Kabanov	3	0	0+1	0	0+1	0	1	0	0	0
36	DF	(Russia) RUS	Fyodor Kudryashov	1	0	1	0	0	0	0	0	0	0
39	MF	(Russia) RUS	Aleksei Rebko	13	0	4+5	0	0	0	2	0	0+2	0
40	FW	(Russia) RUS	Artem Dzyuba	8	0	0+5	0	0	0	1+1	0	0+1	0
46	GK	(Russia) RUS	Aleksei Zuev	5	0	1	0	2	0	0	0	2	0
49	DF	(Russia) RUS	Roman Shishkin	23	1	14	1	0	0	1	0	7+1	0
59	DF	(Russia) RUS	Andrei Ivanov	1	0	0+1	0	0	0	0	0	0	0
77	DF	(Russia) RUS	Yevgeni Shpedt	1	0	1	0	0	0	0	0	0	0
Players away from the club on loan:
4	DF	(Romania) ROU	Gabriel Tamaș	5	0	2+1	0	2	0	0	0	0	0
Players who appeared for Spartak Moscow but left during the season:
5	DF	(Romania) ROU	Adrian Iencsi	12	0	7	0	5	0	0	0	0	0
8	MF	(Russia) RUS	Dmitri Alenichev	2	0	0	0	1+1	0	0	0	0	0

=== Goal scorers ===
Place	Position	Nation	Number	Name	Premier League	2005-06 Russian Cup	2006-07 Russian Cup	UEFA Champions League	Total
1	FW	(Russia)	10	Roman Pavlyuchenko	18	0	0	3	21
2	FW	(Argentina)	19	Fernando Cavenaghi	5	4	0	0	9
3	MF	(Russia)	9	Yegor Titov	8	0	0	0	8
4	MF	(Russia)	23	Vladimir Bystrov	6	0	1	0	7
4	MF	(Brazil)	24	Mozart	4	2	0	1	7
6	FW	(Serbia)	18	Mihajlo Pjanović	3	2	0	0	5
6	MF	(Ukraine)	25	Maksym Kalynychenko	3	0	0	2	5
6	DF	(Czech Republic)	15	Radoslav Kováč	2	1	0	2	5
6	MF	(Russia)	7	Denis Boyarintsev	2	0	1	2	5
10	FW	(Russia)	32	Nikita Bazhenov	3	0	0	0	3
10	MF	(Russia)	11	Aleksandr Pavlenko	1	1	1	0	3
12	DF	(Czech Republic)	13	Martin Jiránek	2	0	0	0	2
13	FW	(Netherlands)	21	Quincy Owusu-Abeyie	1	0	0	0	1
13	DF	(Argentina)	17	Clemente Rodríguez	1	0	0	0	1
13	DF	(Russia)	49	Roman Shishkin	1	0	0	0	1
TOTALS					60	10	3	10	83

=== Clean sheets ===
Place	Position	Nation	Number	Name	Premier League	2005-06 Russian Cup	2006-07 Russian Cup	UEFA Champions League	Total
1	GK	(Poland)	30	Wojciech Kowalewski	5	0	1	2	8
2	GK	(Russia)	46	Aleksei Zuev	1	2	0	0	3
3	GK	(Russia)	1	Dmitri Khomich	1	0	0	0	1
TOTALS					7	2	1	2	12

=== Disciplinary record ===
Number	Nation	Position	Name	Premier League		2005-06 Russian Cup		2006-07 Russian Cup		UEFA Champions League		Total	
Number	Nation	Position	Name	Yellow card	Red card	Yellow card	Red card	Yellow card	Red card	Yellow card	Red card	Yellow card	Red card
2	(Brazil)	DF	Géder	5	1	0	0	1	0	1	0	7	1
3	(Austria)	DF	Martin Stranzl	5	0	2	0	0	0	1	0	8	0
5	(Romania)	DF	Adrian Iencsi	3	0	0	0	0	0	0	0	3	0
7	(Russia)	MF	Denis Boyarintsev	2	0	0	0	0	0	0	0	2	0
9	(Russia)	MF	Yegor Titov	3	0	0	0	0	0	0	0	3	0
10	(Russia)	FW	Roman Pavlyuchenko	7	1	1	0	0	0	1	0	9	1
11	(Russia)	MF	Aleksandr Pavlenko	1	0	1	0	0	0	0	0	2	0
13	(Czech Republic)	DF	Martin Jiránek	4	0	0	0	1	0	1	0	6	0
14	(Russia)	MF	Dmitri Torbinski	3	1	0	0	0	0	0	0	3	1
15	(Czech Republic)	DF	Radoslav Kováč	9	1	0	0	0	0	1	0	10	1
17	(Argentina)	DF	Clemente Rodríguez	7	0	2	0	0	0	0	0	9	0
18	(Serbia)	FW	Mihajlo Pjanović	1	0	0	0	0	0	0	0	1	0
19	(Argentina)	FW	Fernando Cavenaghi	4	0	0	0	0	0	1	0	5	0
21	(Netherlands)	FW	Quincy Owusu-Abeyie	1	0	0	0	0	0	0	0	1	0
23	(Russia)	MF	Vladimir Bystrov	5	0	1	0	0	0	2	0	8	0
24	(Brazil)	MF	Mozart	7	0	3	1	0	0	2	0	12	1
25	(Ukraine)	MF	Maksym Kalynychenko	3	0	0	0	1	0	3	0	7	0
27	(Moldova)	MF	Serghei Covalciuc	2	0	0	0	0	0	0	0	2	0
30	(Poland)	GK	Wojciech Kowalewski	3	0	1	0	0	0	0	0	4	0
32	(Russia)	FW	Nikita Bazhenov	1	0	1	0	0	0	0	0	2	0
40	(Russia)	FW	Artem Dzyuba	1	0	0	0	0	0	0	0	1	0
46	(Russia)	GK	Aleksei Zuev	0	0	0	0	0	0	1	0	1	0
49	(Russia)	DF	Roman Shishkin	3	0	0	0	0	0	0	0	3	0
77	(Russia)	DF	Yevgeni Shpedt	1	0	0	0	0	0	0	0	1	0
Players away on loan:
4	(Romania)	DF	Gabriel Tamaș	1	0	0	0	0	0	0	0	1	0
Players who left Spartak Moscow season during the season:
Total				82	4	12	1	3	0	14	0	111	5
