= Alexander Laktionov =

Alexander Laktionov (or Aleksandr Laktionov) may refer to:

- Aleksandr Ivanovich Laktionov (1910—1972), Soviet painter
- Aleksandr Laktionov (footballer) (born 1986), Russian football player

== See also ==
- Laktionov (disambiguation)
