= Aleksandr Laktionov =

Aleksandr Laktionov may refer to:

- Aleksandr Laktionov (painter) (1910–1972), Socialist realism painter in the post-war Soviet Union
- Aleksandr Laktionov (footballer) (born 1986), football midfielder from Russia
