= Quincy Owusu-Abeyie =

Ghanaian footballer (born 1986)

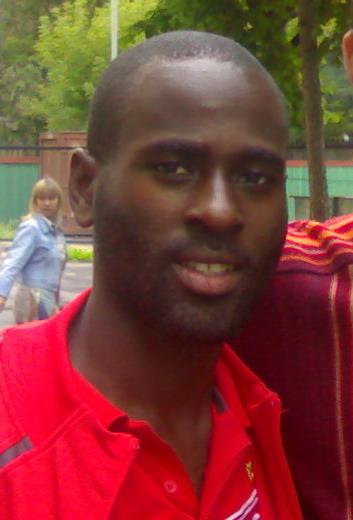
- Owusu-Abeyie pictured in 2007

Personal information
- Full name: Quincy Jamie Owusu-Abeyie
- Date of birth: 15 April 1986 (age 40)
- Place of birth: Amsterdam, Netherlands
- Height: 1.80 m (5 ft 11 in)
- Positions: Forward; left winger

Youth career
- 1993–2002: Ajax
- 2002–2003: Arsenal

Senior career*
Years	Team	Apps	(Gls)
2003–2006	Arsenal	5	(0)
2006–2010	Spartak Moscow	29	(3)
2007–2008	→ Celta Vigo (loan)	21	(4)
2008–2009	→ Birmingham City (loan)	19	(2)
2009	→ Cardiff City (loan)	5	(0)
2010	→ Portsmouth (loan)	10	(0)
2010–2011	Al-Sadd		
2010–2011	→ Málaga (loan)	25	(2)
2011–2014	Panathinaikos	38	(5)
2014–2015	Boavista	7	(0)
2016–2017	NEC	12	(0)
Total		171	(16)

International career
2005–2006	Netherlands U21	7	(1)
2008–2011	Ghana	17	(2)
- * Club domestic league appearances and goals

Quincy Jamie Owusu-Abeyie (born 15 April 1986), often known simply as Quincy, is a former professional footballer who played as a forward or left winger. Quincy is also a rapper, who goes by the name BLOW.

He began his career with Ajax before moving to Arsenal as a 16-year-old. He went on to play for clubs in a variety of countries: Spartak Moscow of the Russian Premier League, Spanish clubs Celta Vigo and Málaga, Birmingham City, Cardiff City and Portsmouth in the English leagues, Al-Sadd of Qatar, Super League Greece club Panathinaikos, Boavista of Portugal, and most recently in his native Netherlands with NEC.

Quincy played international football for his country of birth at youth level, but in 2007 requested to become eligible to represent his parents' country, Ghana, instead. FIFA approved his request just ahead of the 2008 Africa Cup of Nations, and he represented Ghana in that tournament and at the 2010 World Cup.

== Club career ==
=== Early career and Ajax ===
Quincy was born in Amsterdam, Netherlands, to Ghanaian parents. Quincy had been a member of the youth system at hometown club Ajax for nine years when he was released at the age of 16 for alleged attitude problems.

=== Arsenal ===
Liam Brady, head of youth development at Premier League club Arsenal, offered him a trial which proved successful, and the player joined Arsenal as a scholar in September 2002. In the 2002–03 season he scored 17 goals in 20 games for the under-17 side, including six in a 7–1 victory over Wolverhampton Wanderers U17. Handed his first professional contract on his 18th birthday – a move which led to Arsenal being fined £10,000 and given a suspended two-year transfer ban for inadvertently dealing with an unlicensed agent – Quincy signed a new long-term contract in July 2005.

His first-team debut came as an 85th-minute substitute in the League Cup match against Rotherham United on 28 October 2003. During extra time he attempted to chip Rotherham goalkeeper Mike Pollitt, who handled the ball outside his penalty area and was sent off. With the score 1–1 after 120 minutes the game was decided in a penalty shootout – the first ever shootout featuring Arsenal at Highbury – which Arsenal won, although Quincy missed his kick. He scored his first goal for the first team in the same competition on 9 November 2004 against Everton, a match in which he also made two assists, and contributed two appearances to Arsenal's victorious 2004–05 FA Cup campaign. He produced an impressive performance against Reading during the Gunners' 2005–06 League Cup run.

However, he failed to break through to regular first-team selection. Although he accepted the need for patience, and appreciated training alongside and learning from players such as Thierry Henry and Dennis Bergkamp, once Arsenal boosted their forward line in the January 2006 transfer window by signing Togo international Emmanuel Adebayor and rising star Theo Walcott, Quincy recognised that he needed to leave.

=== Spartak Moscow ===
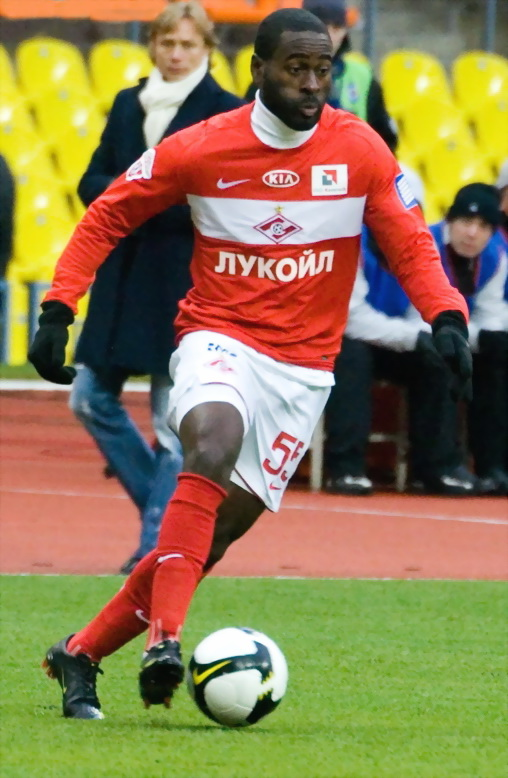
Quincy in action for Spartak Moscow

Quincy signed for Russian club Spartak Moscow for an undisclosed fee on 31 January 2006.

==== Celta Vigo (loan) ====
In June 2007, it was reported that Premier League club Birmingham City had expressed interest in Quincy and wanted to bring him back to play in England; but, on the final day of the summer 2007 transfer window, he joined Spanish side Celta Vigo on loan for the 2007–08 season with an option to purchase. He made 20 appearances in the Segunda División, of which half were as a substitute, and scored five goals, though he missed several weeks of the season on international duty at the 2008 African Cup of Nations.

==== Birmingham City (loan) ====
On 6 August 2008, Quincy joined Birmingham City on loan, initially until January 2009, but with the intention of extending the loan for the rest of the season. An option was included to purchase the player outright at that point. He made his debut as a second-half substitute in the first-round League Cup match against Wycombe Wanderers, scoring the fourth goal in a 4–0 win with a fine finish from 18 yards (16 m). He then went on to score crucial league goals against Cardiff City and Derby County. The initial loan was not extended past January 2009, manager Alex McLeish suggesting that financial considerations might have come into play.

==== Cardiff City (loan) ====
Quincy trialled with Premier League Tottenham Hotspur, but went on to sign for Cardiff City of the Football League Championship on loan until the end of the 2008–09 season, again with the option of making the switch permanent at that point. He made his debut for the club on 25 February as a late substitute for Chris Burke in a 0–0 draw with Queens Park Rangers, but made only three more substitute appearances for the club during the remainder of the season before returning to Moscow.

Reportedly "available for a small fee", he trained with Championship side Bristol City for ten days in August 2009, but no deal was forthcoming.

==== Portsmouth (loan) ====
On 27 January 2010, Quincy signed for Premier League side Portsmouth on loan for the rest of the 2009–10 season, and made his debut in the defeat at Manchester City four days later, coming on as a late substitute for Hayden Mullins. As a second-half substitute in Portsmouth's fifth-round FA Cup-tie against local rivals Southampton, Quincy made a decisive impact, scoring the opening goal with a "low and precise finish" before setting up two further goals as Portsmouth won 4–1.

=== Al-Sadd ===
In late March, Spartak were reported to have repaid Portsmouth half the loan fee of £500,000 to terminate the loan agreement early, and on 31 March, Quincy signed a three-year contract with Qatari club Al-Sadd.

==== Málaga (loan) ====
By the summer of 2010, Quincy was playing for La Liga club Málaga during their pre-season tour of Germany, and on 20 August, signed for the club on loan for the 2010–11 season. He scored his first goal for the club, and had an assist, as Málaga beat Real Zaragoza 5–3 in the second week of the season.

=== Panathinaikos ===
Quincy joined Super League Greece club Panathinaikos in July 2011 on a one-year loan. After of some actions of Panathinaikos management in 2012 transfer period, Quincy finally came to sign a three-year contract with the team. The player was happy to his return and work under the instructions of Jesualdo Ferreira.

=== Boavista ===
After unsuccessful trials at Crystal Palace and Real Valladolid, Quincy signed a one-year contract with Portuguese Primeira Liga club Boavista on 27 August 2014. His contract was terminated by mutual consent in February 2015; he made eleven appearances in all competitions, and scored once, in the Taça da Liga.

=== Search for a new club ===
After his release from Boavista, Quincy began searching for a new club. Negotiations with Iraqi club Al Shorta broke down, and he had unsuccessful trials back in the Netherlands with Eredivisie clubs Cambuur and Heerenveen. In July 2016, a third Eredivisie club, NEC, signed him on a one-year contract. He made 12 league appearances before being demoted to the reserve team for disciplinary reasons, and in January 2017, he was released by mutual consent.

In 2020, Quincy retired at the age of 30 to pursue a new career as a rapper. However, he returned to football in summer 2020, when he was registered for Dutch amateur club Robinhood.

== International career ==
=== Netherlands youth teams ===
Quincy appeared at the 2005 FIFA World Youth Championship for the Netherlands national under-21 football team, the Jong Oranje in the summer of 2005. In the first game against Japan, he set up Ryan Babel for a close range goal. Though the Netherlands crashed out of the tournament in the quarter-finals after a penalty shoot-out against Nigeria, Described by FIFA.com as "a bit special... full of power, pace and bags of sumptuous skill", Quincy was profiled as one of the Best Players of that FIFA U20 Championship.

Quincy was a member of the Netherlands' junior teams from the age of 15, progressing through all the way to the under-21s. He played his last game for the Dutch on 14 November 2006 in a 1–0 friendly loss to England in Alkmaar.

=== Switch to Ghana ===
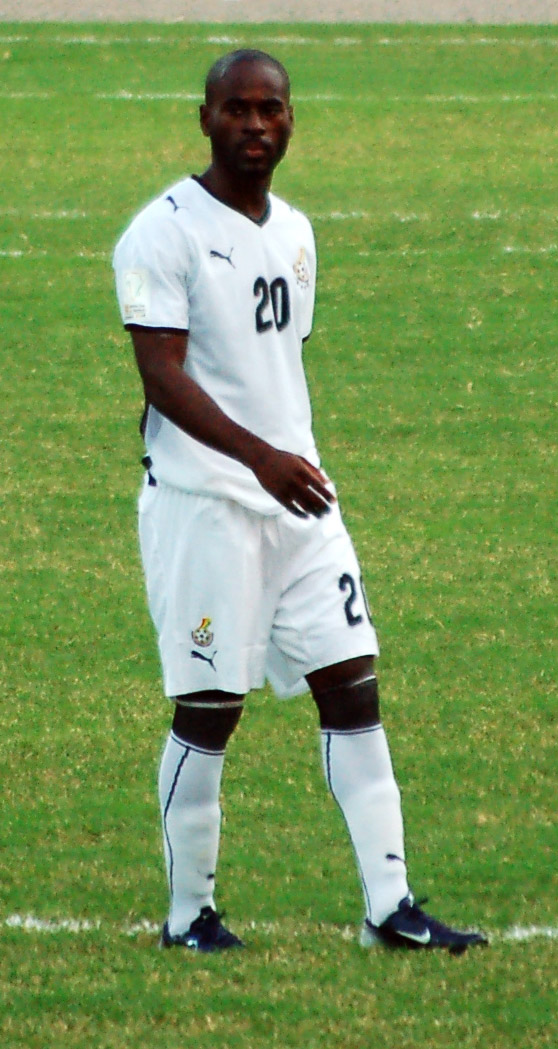
Quincy Owusu-Abeyie with Ghana in 2008

In January 2007, Quincy went to Ghana to meet with Ghana Football Association (GFA) officials and discuss his role in Ghanaian football with specific reference to switching allegiance to that country's national team. Ghana had hoped to persuade him to represent them at the 2006 FIFA World Cup in Germany, but his previous appearances for his native country at youth level precluded that. As a result of the talks, Quincy pledged his senior international future to Ghana, and coach Claude Le Roy named him in the squad for the February friendly against Nigeria in February. However, FIFA was yet to approve Quincy's request for a switch of nationality, and he was not released by Spartak Moscow, prompting a complaint to FIFA by Ghana's national coach. Although called up for Ghana's match against Austria in March 2007, Quincy did not play, but did confirm that he intended to play for Ghana in the future.

On 18 December 2007, Quincy was called up by Ghana as part of the 40-man squad for their two-week training camp in Dubai ahead of the 2008 African Cup of Nations. He later told Spanish media that he was very happy to receive the call-up. On 10 January 2008, FIFA approved Quincy's request to switch to Ghana – his teammates threw water over him in celebration – and he was duly selected for Ghana's 2008 African Cup of Nations squad. He was a member of the team that defeated Nigeria on 3 February to advance to the semi-finals, and scored his first international goal in the third-place match of the 2008 African Cup of Nations, in which Ghana defeated Ivory Coast 4–2.

Quincy was named in the 30-man squad for to prepare for the 2010 World Cup in South Africa, and took part in pre-tournament training in France. He was selected as part of the 23-man squad for the tournament. On 5 June, he scored the only goal as Ghana beat Latvia in their last warm-up match at Stadium mk in Milton Keynes, England. Quincy appeared twice in the group stage as Ghana reached the quarterfinals, in which he was an unused substitute as they went out on penalties to Uruguay.

== Personal life ==
Quincy is a cousin of English rapper Sway.

Using the name "Blow", Quincy released his debut mixtape as a solo rapper. He had recorded tracks for years, and performed in disguise with Amsterdam rap group De Fellas, before releasing the mixtape in early 2020.

== Career statistics ==
=== Club ===
Appearances and goals by club, season and competition
Club	Season	League			National cup		League cup		Other		Total	
Club	Season	Division	Apps	Goals	Apps	Goals	Apps	Goals	Apps	Goals	Apps	Goals
Arsenal	2003–04	Premier League	0	0	0	0	3	0	0	0	3	0
Arsenal	2004–05	Premier League	1	0	2	0	3	1	1 (Note: Appearance(s) in UEFA Champions League)	0	7	1
Arsenal	2005–06	Premier League	4	0	1	0	4	1	4	0	13	1
Arsenal	Total		5	0	3	0	10	2	5	0	23	2
Spartak Moscow	2005	Russian Premier League	—		5	0	—		—		5	0
Spartak Moscow	2006	Russian Premier League	15	1	4	0	—		6 (Note: Five appearances in Champions League, one in Russian Super Cup)	0	25	1
Spartak Moscow	2007	Russian Premier League	6	0	0	0	—		0	0	6	0
Spartak Moscow	2009	Russian Premier League	8	2	0	0	—				8	2
Spartak Moscow	Total		29	3	9	0	—		6	0	44	3
Celta de Vigo (loan)	2007–08	Segunda División	20	4	0	0	—		—		20	4
Birmingham City (loan)	2008–09	Championship	19	2	—		2	1	—		21	3
Cardiff City (loan)	2008–09	Championship	4	0	0	0	—		—		4	0
Portsmouth (loan)	2009–10	Premier League	10	0	1	1	—		—		11	1
Al-Sadd	2009–10	Qatar Stars League										
Málaga (loan)	2010–11	La Liga	25	2	3	1	—		—		28	3
Panathinaikos (loan)	2011–12	Super League Greece	25	4	2	0	—		8 (Note: One appearance in Champions League, two in UEFA Europa League, five in Super League Greece European play-offs)	0	35	4
Panathinaikos	2012–13	Super League Greece	13	0	1	0	—		5 (Note: Appearances in Europa League)	0	19	0
Boavista	2014–15	Primeira Liga	7	0	1	0	3	1	—		11	1
NEC	2016–17	Eredivisie	12	0	1	0	—		—		13	0
Career total			169	15	21	2	15	4	24	0	229	21

=== International ===
Scores and results list Ghana's goal tally first, score column indicates score after each Owusu-Abeyie goal.

List of international goals scored by Quincy Owusu-Abeyie
No.	Date	Venue	Opponent	Score	Result	Competition
1	3 February 2008	Baba Yara Stadium, Kumasi, Ghana	Ivory Coast	2–2	4–2	2008 Africa Cup of Nations
2	5 June 2010	Stadium:mk, Milton Keynes, England	Latvia	1–0	1–0	Friendly
