= Laktionov =

Laktionov may refer to:

- Aleksandr Ivanovich Laktionov, acclaimed Socialist realism painter in the post-war Soviet Union.
- Aleksandr Laktionov (footballer), Russian football player.
- Denis Laktionov, South Korean-Russian football player.
- Serhiy Laktionov, Ukrainian football player and manager.
- Laktionov Island, sub-Antarctic island.
