= Andrei Alenichev =

Russian footballer and coach

Personal information
- Full name: Andrei Anatolyevich Alenichev
- Date of birth: 27 January 1971 (age 55)
- Place of birth: Velikiye Luki, Russian SFSR
- Height: 1.71 m (5 ft 7 in)
- Positions: Striker; midfielder

Senior career*
Years	Team	Apps	(Gls)
1990–1993	FC Mashinostroitel Pskov	59	(14)
1994–1995	NK Samobor		
1995	NK Slavonija Požega	7	(3)
1996	KRC Genk	5	(0)
1996–1998	FC Energiya Velikiye Luki	73	(27)
1999	FC Pskov (amat.)	23	(8)
2000–2005	FC Pskov-2000	166	(29)
2005	FC Luki-SKIF Velikiye Luki (amat.)	3	(0)
2006–2007	747-Pskov (amat.)	28	(6)
2008	FC Pskov-747	5	(1)

Managerial career
- 2009: FC Pskov-747
- 2010: FC Pskov-747 (assistant)
- 201?–: FC Avtofavorit Pskov
- * Club domestic league appearances and goals

Andrei Anatolyevich Alenichev (Russian: Андрей Анатольевич Аленичев; born 27 January 1971) is a Russian professional football coach and a former player.

== Playing career ==
As a player, he made his debut in the Soviet Second League in 1990 for FC Mashinostroitel Pskov.

== Personal life ==
He is the older brother of Dmitri Alenichev.

== External sources ==
- Andrei Alenichev at Croatian Football Statistics (archived) (in Croatian)
