= Mozart (footballer) =

Brazilian footballer

- Mozart with Goiás in 2026

Personal information
- Full name: Mozart Santos Batista Júnior
- Date of birth: 8 November 1979 (age 47)
- Place of birth: Curitiba, Brazil
- Height: 1.74 m (5 ft 9 in)
- Position: Defensive midfielder

Team information
- Current team: Goiás (head coach)

Youth career
- 1997: Paraná
- 1998: Bordeaux
- 1998–1999: Coritiba

Senior career*
Years	Team	Apps	(Gls)
1999–2000	Coritiba	32	(0)
2000	Flamengo	26	(0)
2000–2005	Reggina	138	(9)
2005–2009	Spartak Moscow	68	(7)
2009	Palmeiras	6	(0)
2009–2010	Livorno	21	(0)
2012	Nanchang Bayi		

International career
1999–2000	Brazil U23	15	(1)

Managerial career
- 2013: Canoinhas
- 2013: Sport Jaraguá
- 2015–2019: Coritiba U20
- 2020: Coritiba (interim)
- 2020–2021: CSA
- 2021: Chapecoense
- 2021: Cruzeiro
- 2021–2022: CSA
- 2022–2023: Guarani
- 2023: Atlético Goianiense
- 2023–2024: Mirassol
- 2025: Coritiba
- 2026: Ceará
- 2026–: Goiás
- * Club domestic league appearances and goals

Mozart Santos Batista Júnior, usually known simply as Mozart (born 8 November 1979) is a Brazilian football coach and former player who played in both the defensive midfielder and attacking midfielder positions. He is the current head coach of Goiás.

== Club career ==
Born in Curitiba, Paraná, Mozart started his career with Paraná Clube, before moving to France with FC Girondins de Bordeaux in 1998, although he did not play any games for them. He returned to play in Brazil for Coritiba, joining the club in July 1998 and being initially assigned to the under-20s.

Promoted to the first team for the 1999 season, Mozart subsequently became a starter for the club, and joined fellow top tier side Flamengo in March 2000, for a fee of US$ 3.5 million. At that time, he also appeared for the Olympic national team in the 2000 Summer Olympics.

In October 2000, Mozart was sold to Serie A's Reggina Calcio, for a fee of US$4 million. He subsequently became a regular starter for the side, helping in their promotion back to the first division in 2003.

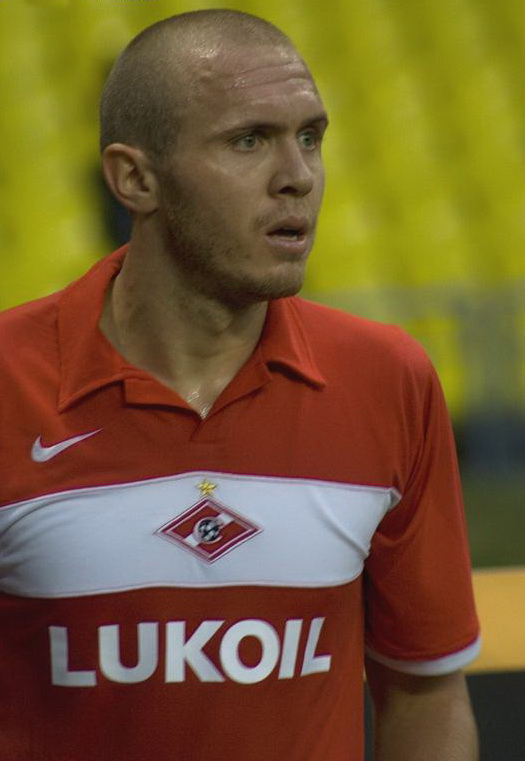
Mozart with Spartak Moscow in 2007

In August 2005, Mozart moved to Spartak Moscow, for a fee of around €6 million. He terminated his contract with Spartak in March 2009, and the following month he signed for Palmeiras.

Mozart's time at Palmeiras ended in August 2009 when he joined Livorno. He left the club in July 2010, staying more than a year without a club before signing for Chinese side Nanchang Bayi. After that short stint he retired, initially dedicating his time to producing cachaça in his native state.

== International career ==
Mozart was in the Brazil squad for the 2000 Summer Olympics.

== Managerial career ==
In June 2013, Mozart was named manager of Canoinhas for the Campeonato Catarinense Série B, but was dismissed without managing the team in a single match, after altercations with the club's board. Late in the month, he took over Sport Jaraguá in the same state's third division.

On 21 July 2014, Mozart was named Francesco Cozza's assistant at Reggina 1914. In the following year, he returned to Coritiba, being initially named assistant manager of the under-20 squad and later appointed manager of the side in December.

Mozart was later appointed assistant manager of the main squad during the 2019 season, and was named interim manager on 20 August 2020 after the dismissal of Eduardo Barroca. He was in charge for one match, and returned to his assistant role after the arrival of Jorginho.

On 18 September 2020, Mozart was named manager of Série B side CSA. He renewed his contract for a further season on 28 December, and subsequently narrowly missed out promotion to the first division.

On 18 April 2021, Mozart resigned from CSA and took over Chapecoense, newly promoted to the top tier. He was sacked on 27 May, after losing the year's Campeonato Catarinense, and took over Cruzeiro back in the second division on 10 June.

On 30 July 2021, Mozart resigned from Cruzeiro, and returned to CSA exactly one month later. On 13 June 2022, he resigned from the latter side, and took over fellow second division side Guarani fifteen days later.

On 19 February 2023, Mozart was sacked by Bugre after a poor start of the campaign, and took over fellow second division side Atlético Goianiense on 11 March. On 1 May, despite winning the 2023 Campeonato Goiano, he was sacked, and was named in charge of Mirassol in the same category three days later.

On 26 November 2024, after leading Mirassol to their first-ever promotion to the top tier, Mozart left the club, and returned to Coxa just hours later, now as permanent head coach. On 28 November 2025, after another top tier promotion, now as champions, he left after failing to agree new terms.

On 12 December 2025 Mozart was appointed head coach of Ceará, also in the second division, on a one-year contract. The following 31 May, he was sacked, and took over fellow league team Goiás on 25 June.

== Career statistics ==
Appearances and goals by club, season and competition
Club	Season	League			State League		Cup		Continental		Other		Total	
Club	Season	Division	Apps	Goals	Apps	Goals	Apps	Goals	Apps	Goals	Apps	Goals	Apps	Goals
Coritiba	1999	Série A	18	0	14	0	5	0	—		2 (Note: Appearance(s) in Seletiva para a Libertadores)	0	39	0
Coritiba	2000	Série A	0	0	0	0	0	0	—		2 (Note: Appearance(s) in Copa Sul-Minas)	0	2	0
Coritiba	Total		18	0	14	0	5	0	—		4	0	41	0
Flamengo	2000	Série A	11	0	15	0	7	1	1 (Note: Appearance(s) in Copa Mercosur)	0	4 (Note: Appearance(s) in Copa dos Campeões)	0	38	1
Reggina	2000–01	Serie A	13	1	—		—		—		—		13	1
Reggina	2001–02	Serie B	36	2	—		2	1	—		—		38	3
Reggina	2002–03	Serie B	28	2	—		0	0	—		—		28	2
Reggina	2003–04	Serie A	26	2	—		1	0	—		—		27	2
Reggina	2004–05	Serie A	35	2	—		1	0	—		—		36	2
Reggina	Total		138	9	—		4	1	—		—		142	10
Spartak Moscow	2005	Russian Premier League	7	0	—		0	0	—		—		7	0
Spartak Moscow	2006	Russian Premier League	22	4	—		0	0	10 (Note: Appearance(s) in UEFA Champions League)	1	—		32	5
Spartak Moscow	2007	Russian Premier League	18	1	—		0	0	9 (Note: Two appearances in UEFA Champions League, seven appearances and one goal in UEFA Cup)	1	1 (Note: Appearance(s) in Russian Super Cup)	0	28	2
Spartak Moscow	2008	Russian Premier League	21	2	—		0	0	4 (Note: Two appearances in UEFA Champions League, two appearances in UEFA Cup)	0	—		25	2
Spartak Moscow	Total		68	7	—		0	0	23	2	1	0	92	9
Palmeiras	2009	Série A	6	0	—		—		2 (Note: Appearance(s) in Copa Libertadores)	0	—		8	0
Livorno	2009–10	Série A	21	0	—		1	0	—		—		22	0
Career total			262	16	29	0	17	2	26	2	9	0	343	20

== Managerial statistics ==
As of 12 June 2025

Managerial record by team and tenure
Team	Nat	From	To	Record								Ref
Team	Nat	From	To	G	W	D	L	GF	GA	GD	Win %	Ref
Canoinhas	(Brazil)	7 February 2013	17 April 2013	0	0	0	0	0	0	+0	—	
Sport Jaraguá	(Brazil)	20 June 2013	November 2013	18	13	3	2	48	12	+36	72.22	
Coritiba (interim)	(Brazil)	20 August 2020	23 August 2020	1	1	0	0	2	1	+1	100.00	
CSA	(Brazil)	18 September 2020	18 April 2021	45	20	17	8	73	36	+37	44.44	
Chapecoense	(Brazil)	18 April 2021	27 May 2021	8	3	3	2	11	8	+3	37.50	
Cruzeiro	(Brazil)	10 June 2021	3 August 2021	13	2	7	4	14	18	−4	15.38	
CSA	(Brazil)	2 September 2021	13 June 2022	51	23	17	11	71	39	+32	45.10	
Guarani	(Brazil)	28 June 2022	20 February 2023	33	14	6	13	33	32	+1	42.42	
Atlético Goianiense	(Brazil)	14 March 2023	1 May 2023	7	3	2	2	21	18	+3	42.86	
Mirassol	(Brazil)	4 May 2023	26 November 2024	83	37	24	22	94	68	+26	44.58	
Coritiba	(Brazil)	26 November 2024	28 November 2025	48	24	15	9	58	29	+29	50.00	
Ceará	(Brazil)	12 December 2025	31 May 2026	31	14	10	7	51	29	+22	45.16	
Goiás	(Brazil)	25 June 2026	present	0	0	0	0	0	0	+0	—	
Total				315	143	96	76	476	290	+186	45.40	—

== Honours ==
=== Coach ===
Atlético Goianiense

- Campeonato Goiano: 2023

Coritiba

- Campeonato Brasileiro Série B: 2025
