= Dmitri Alenichev =

Russian footballer and politician

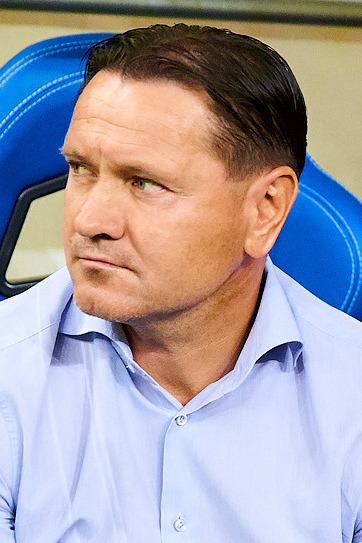
- Alenichev in 2018

Personal information
- Full name: Dmitri Anatolievich Alenichev
- Date of birth: 20 October 1972 (age 54)
- Place of birth: Melioratorov, Velikoluksky District, Pskov Oblast, Russian SFSR, Soviet Union
- Height: 1.71 m (5 ft 7 in)
- Position: Attacking midfielder

Team information
- Current team: Arsenal Tula (manager)

Senior career*
Years	Team	Apps	(Gls)
1989	SKIF-Express Velikie Luki	17	(4)
1990–1991	Mashinostroitel Pskov	38	(7)
1991–1993	Lokomotiv Moscow	69	(6)
1994–1998	Spartak Moscow	122	(18)
1998–2000	Roma	28	(2)
1999–2000	→ Perugia (loan)	15	(0)
2000–2004	Porto	84	(12)
2004–2006	Spartak Moscow	21	(3)
Total		394	(52)

International career
1992	USSR U-21	1	(0)
1993	Russia U-21	2	(0)
1996–2005	Russia	55	(6)

Managerial career
- 2010–2012: Russia U18
- 2011–2015: Arsenal Tula
- 2015–2016: Spartak Moscow
- 2017–2019: Yenisey Krasnoyarsk
- 2026–: Arsenal Tula
Russian Federation Senator from Omsk Oblast
In office 6 July 2007 – 10 November 2010
Preceded by	Mikhail Lapshin
Succeeded by	Aleksey Sokin
- * Club domestic league appearances and goals

Dmitri Anatolyevich Alenichev (Russian: Дмитрий Анатольевич Аленичев; born 20 October 1972) is a Russian football coach, former player, and politician who is the manager of Arsenal Tula.

== Club career ==
Despite being a Spartak Moscow fan, Alenichev debuted 1991 for Moscow rivals Lokomotiv Moscow, where he played four years before moving to Spartak, where in five years he won three Russian leagues and two cups, and was also elected Russian player of the year in 1997. Won Malta International Football Tournament 1996. On 14 June 1998 Italian Serie A side Roma officially agreed with Spartak for 7 million USD and the player moved to Rome. He played 21 matches in his first season, but after only seven matches in the second season, he moved to Perugia in December 1999. His stint in Italy overall proved to be unsuccessful and he was eventually considered to be one of Italian football's biggest foreign flops.

In 2000, he moved to Portuguese Primeira Liga side Porto, where he made a strong first impression, scored the equalizing goal against rivals Sporting CP in the first leg of the 2000 Supertaça Cândido de Oliveira. He was also impressive overall in first season, as Porto captured the Taça de Portugal after winning the final 2–0 against Marítimo, Alenichev scoring the second goal. The following season, Alenichev suffered some animosity from new Porto head coach Octávio Machado (similar to his compatriot Sergei Ovchinnikov) and spent most of the first half of the season sidelined, under the shadow of Deco.

When Octávio was sacked and replaced with José Mourinho, Alenichev's prospects changed. Although he was not a regular in the starting 11, he was usually the first player substituted onto the pitch, particularly when Mourinho shifted from a 4–3–3 to a 4–4–2 formation. On 21 May 2003, he became the first Russian to play and to score in an UEFA club competition during the 2003 UEFA Cup final. On 26 May 2004, he became the first Russian to play (Note: out of two, along with Matvey Safonov), to score and to win (Note: out of two, along with Matvey Safonov) the UEFA Champions League final during the 2004 final. He remains the only Russian goalscorer in the UEFA Champions League final. A starting player in the 2003 UEFA Cup Final and mid-match substitute in the 2004 UEFA Champions League Final, Alenichev scored in both contests, the only Russian player to do so as of 2023. In the former, against Celtic, he scored the second goal, following a pass from Deco; and in the latter, against Monaco, he closed the scoreline with a powerful volley shot following a deflected through cross from Derlei. This made him one of only three players to score goals in two consecutive cup finals of different European competitions, the others being Ronald Koeman and Ronaldo.

During UEFA Euro 2004, in which Alenichev played in all three of Russia's matchups, he announced his desire to return to Spartak Moscow. In appreciation for the services done for the club, the FC Porto board made no objections to the transfer.

On 8 April 2006, Sport-Express published Alenichev's interview containing severe criticism of Aleksandrs Starkovs, Spartak's head coach at the time. Following that, Alenichev was fined, dismissed from the first team, transfer listed 14 April and on 10 September his contract was finally terminated by mutual agreement. This marked the end of his playing career.

== Managerial career ==
In 2011, he joined FC Arsenal Tula as a manager and led the club through three promotions in 3 seasons from fourth-level Russian Amateur Football League to the top-level Russian Premier League. Arsenal was relegated after just one season in the top tier and Alenichev left.

In June 2015, he became manager of his former club Spartak Moscow. He resigned as Spartak manager on 5 August 2016 following Spartak's elimination in the 2016–17 UEFA Europa League third qualifying round by AEK Larnaca. At the end of that season, Spartak won the Russian Premier League for the first time in 16 years under the management of his assistant Massimo Carrera.

On 5 June 2017, Alenichev signed a two-year contract with Russian second division club Yenisey Krasnoyarsk. In his first season, he led Yenisey to promotion to the Russian Premier League for the first time in club's history. He was replaced as Yenisey coach after the club was relegated from the Premier League at the end of the 2018–19 season.

== Style of play ==
A technically gifted and offensive-minded midfielder, Alenichev's favoured role was as a number 10 behind the strikers; he was also deployed as a central midfielder on occasion throughout his career, although he lacked both the physicality and tactical sense to excel in this position. Following the arrival of manager José Mourinho in January 2002, Alenichev was identified by the manager as one of six core players who would form the backbone of his ideal Porto squad. Though often used as a tactical substitute to alter the team's midfield formation, he was highly valued by Mourinho for his versatility during their consecutive UEFA Cup and Champions League-winning campaigns.

== Personal life ==
His older brother Andrei Alenichev also played football professionally. He has two sons, Daniil (born 2004) and Timofey (born 2012). Daniil followed in his footsteps and became a footballer too. As of 2026, Daniil plays in Portuguese lower-tier amateur leagues.

Alenichev joined the United Russia party. On 14 June 2007, he was voted the representative of the Omsk Oblast in the Federation Council of Russia. He represented it until 2010, when he accepted the position of head coach of the Russia national under-18 team.

In 2009, Alenichev was part of the Russia squad that won the 2009 Legends Cup.

== Career statistics ==
=== Club ===
As of match played 14 March 2006

Appearances and goals by club, season and competition
Club	Season	League			National Cup		League Cup		Continental		Other		Total	
Club	Season	Division	Apps	Goals	Apps	Goals	Apps	Goals	Apps	Goals	Apps	Goals	Apps	Goals
Mashinostroitel Pskov	1990	Soviet Second League B	31	4	0	0	—		—		—		31	4
Mashinostroitel Pskov	1991	Soviet Second League B	7	3	0	0	—		—		—		7	3
Mashinostroitel Pskov	Total		38	7	0	0	—		—		—		38	7
Lokomotiv Moscow	1991	Soviet Top League	16	0	2	1	—		—		—		18	1
Lokomotiv Moscow	1992	Russian Top League	24	2	5	0	—		—		—		29	2
Lokomotiv Moscow	1993	Russian Top League	29	4	2	0	—		2	0	—		33	4
Lokomotiv Moscow	Total		69	6	9	1	—		2	0	—		80	7
Spartak Moscow	1994	Russian Top League	17	3	4	0	—		6	1	—		27	4
Spartak Moscow	1995	Russian Top League	27	4	3	0	—		4	2	—		34	6
Spartak Moscow	1996	Russian Top League	32	7	2	0	—		8	1	—		42	8
Spartak Moscow	1997	Russian Top League	33	2	4	3	—		8	1	—		45	6
Spartak Moscow	1998	Russian Top League	13	2	4	1	—		4	1	—		21	4
Spartak Moscow	Total		122	18	17	4	—		30	6	—		169	28
Roma	1998–99	Serie A	21	1	3	1	—		5	1	—		29	3
Roma	1999–2000	Serie A	7	1	3	0	—		3	3	—		13	4
Roma	Total		28	2	6	1	—		8	4	—		42	7
Perugia (loan)	1999–2000	Serie A	15	0	0	0	—		0	0	—		15	0
Perugia (loan)	2000–01	Serie A	0	0	0	0	—		2	1	—		2	1
Perugia (loan)	Total		15	0	0	0	—		2	1	—		17	1
Porto	2000–01	Primeira Liga	28	3	4	3	—		9	1	2	1	30	8
Porto	2001–02	Primeira Liga	20	3	2	0	—		7	0	—		28	3
Porto	2002–03	Primeira Liga	18	4	6	0	—		11	2	—		28	6
Porto	2003–04	Primeira Liga	17	2	4	1	—		10	3	1	0	29	6
Porto	Total		83	12	16	4	–		37	6	3	1	139	23
Spartak Moscow	2004	Russian Premier League	13	3	2	0	—		0	0	—		15	3
Spartak Moscow	2005	Russian Premier League	8	0	1	0	—		—		—		9	0
Spartak Moscow	2006	Russian Premier League	0	0	2	0	—		0	0	—		2	0
Spartak Moscow	Total		21	3	5	0	–		0	0	–		26	3
Career total			376	48	53	10	0	0	79	17	3	1	511	76

=== International ===
As of match played 9 February 2005

National team	Year	Apps	Goals
Russia
Russia	1996	2	1
Russia	1997	10	2
Russia	1998	8	0
Russia	1999	6	1
Russia	2000	4	0
Russia	2001	10	2
Russia	2002	5	0
Russia	2003	4	0
Russia	2004	5	0
Russia	2005	1	0
Total		55	6

=== International goals ===
#	Date	Venue	Opponent	Score	Result	Competition
1.	11 February 1996	Ta' Qali National Stadium, Attard	Slovenia	2–0	3–1	1996 Rothmans International Tournament
2.	11 October 1997	Dynamo Stadium, Moscow	Bulgaria	1–0	4–2	1998 World Cup qualifier
3.	11 October 1997	Dynamo Stadium, Moscow	Bulgaria	4–0	4–2	1998 World Cup qualifier
4.	31 March 1999	Republican Spartak Stadium, Vladikavkaz	Andorra	6–1	6–1	Euro 2000 qualifier
5.	6 June 2001	Stade Josy Barthel, Luxembourg	Luxembourg	1–0	2–1	2002 World Cup qualifier
6.	14 November 2001	Skonto Stadium, Riga	Latvia	2–0	3–1	Friendly

=== Managerial ===
Information correct as of match played 26 May 2019. Only competitive matches are counted.

Name	From	To	P	W	D	L	GS	GA	%W	Honours	Notes
Arsenal Tula	22 November 2011	10 June 2015	102	53	18	31	162	111	51.96		
Spartak Moscow	10 June 2015	5 August 2016	35	17	6	12	61	42	48.57		
Yenisey Krasnoyarsk	5 June 2017	26 May 2019	75	32	15	28	106	99	42.67		

- Notes:

P – Total of played matches W – Won matches D – Drawn matches L – Lost matches GS – Goal scored GA – Goals against
%W – Percentage of matches won

Nationality is indicated by the corresponding FIFA country code(s).

== Honours ==
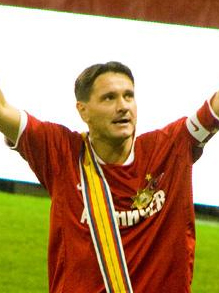
Alenichev in 2008.

Spartak Moscow

- Russian Premier League: 1994, 1996, 1997, 1998
- Russian Cup: 1993–94, 1997–98
- Commonwealth of Independent States Cup: 1994, 1995

Porto

- Primeira Liga: 2002–03, 2003–04
- Taça de Portugal: 2000–01, 2002–03
- Supertaça Cândido de Oliveira: 2003
- UEFA Champions League: 2003–04
- UEFA Cup: 2002–03

Individual

- Footballer of the Year in Russia (Sport-Express): 1997
- Footballer of the Year in Russia (Futbol): 1997
