= Yevgeny Krug =

Russian footballer

Personal information
- Full name: Yevgeny Sergeyevich Krug
- Date of birth: 20 April 1986 (age 40)
- Place of birth: Novosibirsk, Soviet Union
- Height: 1.79 m (5 ft 10 1/2 in)
- Position: Defender

Senior career*
| Years | Team | Apps | (Gls) |
| 2002–2003 | FC Chkalovets-Olimpik Novosibirsk | 1 | (0) |
| 2005–2007 | FC Spartak Moscow | 0 | (0) |
| 2007 | FC Mordovia Saransk | 25 | (1) |
| 2008 | FC Dynamo Barnaul | 5 | (0) |
| 2010 | FC Dynamo Biysk | | |
| 2010 | FC Mostovik-Primorye Ussuriysk | 13 | (1) |
| 2011–2012 | FC Irtysh Omsk | 33 | (3) |
| 2012–2013 | FC Volga Ulyanovsk | 17 | (1) |
| 2013 | FC Yenisey Krasnoyarsk | 4 | (0) |
| 2013–2015 | FC Zenit Penza | 30 | (0) |
| 2015 | FC Novokuznetsk | 12 | (0) |
- * Club domestic league appearances and goals

Yevgeny Sergeyevich Krug (Russian: Евге́ний Серге́евич Круг; born 20 April 1986) is a former Russian professional association football player.

== Club career ==
He played 4 seasons in the Russian Football National League for FC Mordovia Saransk, FC Dynamo Barnaul and FC Yenisey Krasnoyarsk.

== Personal life ==
His younger brother Eduard Krug is also a footballer.
