= Nikolai Tyunin =

Russian footballer (born 1987)

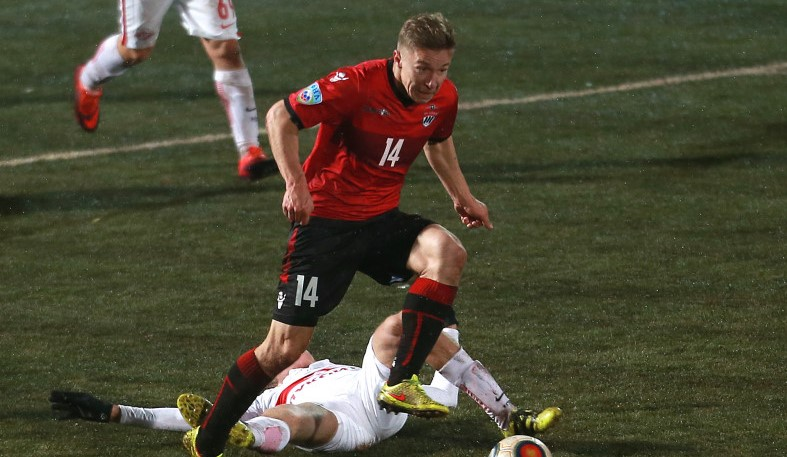

Personal information
- Full name: Nikolai Viktorovich Tyunin
- Date of birth: 6 January 1987 (age 39)
- Place of birth: Vilyuchinsk, Russian SFSR
- Height: 1.75 m (5 ft 9 in)
- Positions: Midfielder; forward

Team information
- Current team: FC Arsenal Tula (assistant coach)

Youth career
- FC Akademika Moscow

Senior career*
Years	Team	Apps	(Gls)
2004–2005	FC Spartak Moscow	0	(0)
2006	FC Presnya Moscow	8	(0)
2006–2007	FC Spartak-MZhK Ryazan	37	(8)
2007–2009	FC Rotor Volgograd	58	(4)
2009–2010	FC Ural Sverdlovsk Oblast	3	(0)
2010	→ FC SOYUZ-Gazprom Izhevsk (loan)	10	(4)
2011	FC Khimki	21	(2)
2012	FC Tyumen	9	(0)
2012	FC Zenit-Izhevsk	11	(0)
2013	FC Gornyak Uchaly	11	(1)
2013–2017	FC Khimki	111	(10)
2018–2019	FC Spartak-2 Moscow	37	(1)
2020	FC Spartak-2 Moscow	0	(0)

Managerial career
- 2020: FC Khimki (analyst)
- 2021: FC Noah (analyst)
- 2022: FC Ararat-Armenia (analyst)
- 2022–2025: FC Urartu (assistant)
- 2025–: FC Arsenal Tula (assistant)
- * Club domestic league appearances and goals

Nikolai Viktorovich Tyunin (Russian: Николай Викторович Тюнин; born 6 January 1987) is a Russian professional football coach and a former player. He is an assistant coach with FC Arsenal Tula.

== Club career ==
He made his professional debut in the Russian Second Division in 2006 for FC Presnya Moscow.

He played 7 seasons in the Russian Football National League for 4 different teams.

== Honours ==
- Russian Cup winner: 2006 (played in the early stages of the 2005–06 tournament for the main squad of FC Spartak Moscow).
