= Timur Bitokov =

Russian footballer

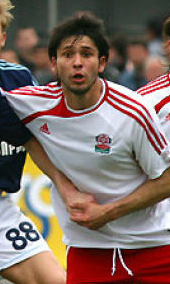

Personal information
- Full name: Timur Viktorovich Bitokov
- Date of birth: 13 March 1984 (age 42)
- Place of birth: Nalchik, Russian SFSR
- Height: 1.78 m (5 ft 10 in)
- Position: Defender

Team information
- Current team: FC Nart Cherkessk (manager)

Youth career
- 1997–2000: FC Lokomotiv Moscow

Senior career*
Years	Team	Apps	(Gls)
2001–2003	FC Lokomotiv Moscow	0	(0)
2004–2006	PFC Spartak Nalchik	60	(0)
2007	FC Krylia Sovetov Samara	1	(0)
2009	PFC Spartak Nalchik	0	(0)
2010	FC Druzhba Maykop	2	(0)
2010	FC Dynamo-Neftyanik Nizhnekumsk		
2011	FC Karelia-Discovery Petrozavodsk (amateur)		
2011–2012	FC GorIs-179 Nalchik		

Managerial career
- 2020: PFC Spartak Nalchik (assistant)
- 2024–2025: PFC Spartak Nalchik
- 2025: FC Chernomorets Novorossiysk (assistant)
- 2026: FC Nart Cherkessk (assistant)
- 2026–: FC Nart Cherkessk
- * Club domestic league appearances and goals

Timur Viktorovich Bitokov (Russian: Тимур Викторович Битоков; born 13 March 1984) is a Russian professional football coach and a former player who is the manager of FC Nart Cherkessk.

== Club career ==
He made his professional debut in the Russian First Division in 2004 for PFC Spartak Nalchik.
