= Dmitry Ivchenko =

Russian footballer

Personal information
- Full name: Dmitry Alexeyevich Ivchenko
- Date of birth: 8 July 1978 (age 48)
- Place of birth: Zelenokumsk, Stavropol Krai, Russian SFSR
- Height: 1.89 m (6 ft 2 1/2 in)
- Position: Defender

Senior career*
| Years | Team | Apps | (Gls) |
| 2005–2006 | FC Okean Nakhodka | 57 | (2) |
| 2007–2009 | FC Metallurg Lipetsk | 85 | (4) |
| 2010 | FC Sokol Saratov | 22 | (1) |
| 2011–2012 | FC Chelyabinsk | 37 | (2) |
| 2012 | FC Oryol | 10 | (0) |
| 2013 | FC Spartak Tambov | 10 | (0) |
- * Club domestic league appearances and goals

Dmitry Alexeyevich Ivchenko (Russian: Дмитрий Алексеевич Ивченко; born 8 July 1978) is a former Russian professional association football player.

== Club career ==
He played in the Russian Football National League for FC Metallurg Lipetsk in 2009.
