= Yevgeni Shpedt =

Russian footballer

Personal information
- Full name: Yevgeni Robertovich Shpedt
- Date of birth: 26 January 1986 (age 40)
- Height: 1.85 m (6 ft 1 in)
- Position: Defender

Senior career*
Years	Team	Apps	(Gls)
2002–2003	FC Chkalovets-Olimpik Novosibirsk	4	(0)
2005–2007	FC Spartak Moscow	1	(0)
2008	FC KAMAZ Naberezhnye Chelny	11	(0)
2009–2010	FC Nizhny Novgorod	54	(0)
2011	FC Khimki	5	(1)
2012	FC Chernomorets Novorossiysk	8	(0)
2012–2013	FC Gornyak Uchaly	15	(0)
2014	FC Chelyabinsk	16	(0)
2015	FC Dynamo Barnaul	2	(0)
2015	FC Novokuznetsk	15	(0)
- * Club domestic league appearances and goals

Yevgeni Robertovich Shpedt (Russian: Евгений Робертович Шпедт; born 26 January 1986) is a Russian former professional footballer.

== Club career ==
He made his debut in the Russian Premier League in 2006 for FC Spartak Moscow.

== Honours ==
- Russian Premier League runner-up: 2006.
- Russian Cup finalist: 2006.
