= Andrei Lodis =

Belarusian footballer

Personal information
- Full name: Andrei Nikolayevich Lodis
- Date of birth: 3 April 1980 (age 46)
- Place of birth: Ushachy, Vitebsk Oblast, Belarusian SSR
- Height: 1.78 m (5 ft 10 in)
- Position: Midfielder

Youth career
- 1996–1998: RUOR Minsk
- 1998–2000: BATE Borisov

Senior career*
Years	Team	Apps	(Gls)
1996–1998	RUOR Minsk	45	(7)
1998	→ Smena-BATE Minsk	9	(0)
1999	→ RUOR Minsk	22	(6)
2000	BATE Borisov	7	(1)
2000	→ RShVSM-Olympia Minsk	7	(0)
2000–2001	SKA-Energiya Khabarovsk	37	(2)
2002	Khimik Svetlogorsk	9	(1)
2002	Tashir Kaluga		
2003	Lokomotiv Kaluga	33	(4)
2004	Sakhalin Yuzhno-Sakhalinsk		
2005–2006	Okean Nakhodka	61	(16)
2007	SKA-Energiya Khabarovsk	11	(0)
2007	Amur Blagoveshchensk	17	(4)
2008	Smena Komsomolsk-na-Amure	26	(12)
2009	Gornyak Uchaly	26	(4)
2010–2012	Smena Komsomolsk-na-Amure	75	(23)
2013–2014	Belogorsk		

International career
1999–2000	Belarus U21	4	(0)
- * Club domestic league appearances and goals

Andrei Nikolayevich Lodis (Russian: Андрей Николаевич Лодис; born 3 April 1980) is a Belarusian former professional football player.

== Honours ==
- Russian Second Division Zone East best midfielder: 2005.
