= Renat Dubinskiy =

Kazak footballer (born 1979)

Personal information
- Full name: Renat Vyacheslavovich Dubinskiy
- Date of birth: 6 May 1979 (age 47)
- Place of birth: Shevchenko, Kazakh SSR
- Height: 1.85 m (6 ft 1 in)
- Positions: Defender; midfielder

Youth career
- SUOR Stavropol

Senior career*
Years	Team	Apps	(Gls)
1995	FC Agidel Ufa	7	(0)
1996	FC Baltika Kaliningrad	0	(0)
1997	FC Dynamo-d Stavropol	39	(0)
1998	FC Nart Cherkessk	4	(0)
1998	FC Lokomotiv-Taim Mineralnye Vody	29	(0)
1999	FC Dynamo Stavropol	36	(2)
2000–2001	FC Baltika Kaliningrad	52	(5)
2001–2005	FC Shinnik Yaroslavl	70	(4)
2005	FC Ural Sverdlovsk Oblast	11	(0)
2006	FC Aktobe	13	(2)
2007	FC Baltika Kaliningrad	3	(0)
2009	MAZ-Service Yaroslavl		

International career
2003–2006	Kazakhstan	13	(0)
- * Club domestic league appearances and goals

Renat Vyacheslavovich Dubinskiy (Russian: Ренат Вячеславович Дубинский; born 6 May 1979) is a retired Kazakh professional footballer.

== Club career ==
He made his professional debut in the Russian Third League in 1995 for FC Agidel Ufa.

He made his Russian Premier League debut for FC Shinnik Yaroslavl on 16 March 2002 in a game against FC Alania Vladikavkaz and spent 4 seasons in the RPL with Shinnik. He played 1 game in the UEFA Intertoto Cup 2004 for Shinnik.
