= Aleksei Zuev =

Russian footballer

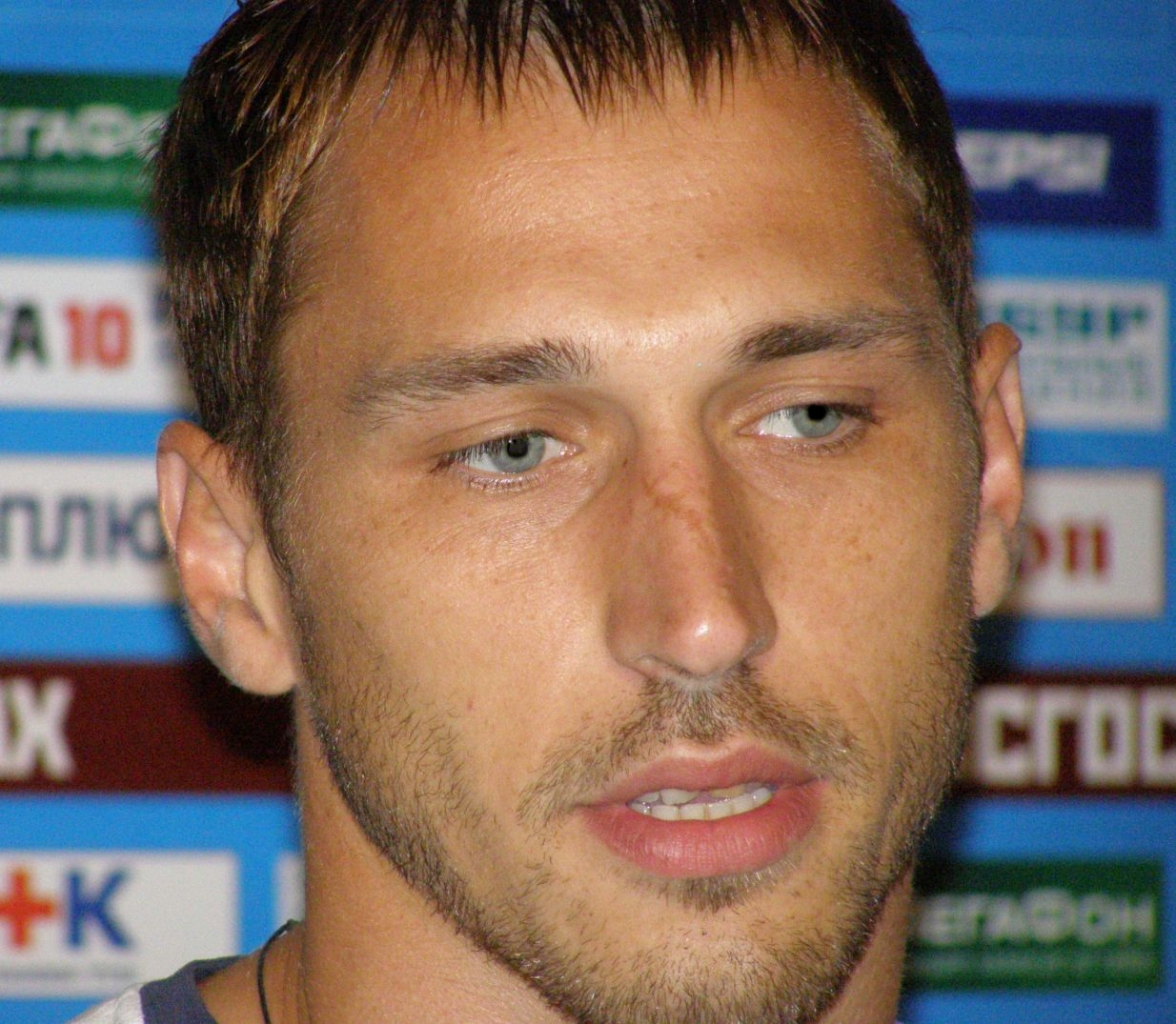

Personal information
- Full name: Aleksei Aleksandrovich Zuev
- Date of birth: 3 February 1981 (age 45)
- Place of birth: Moscow, Russia, USSR
- Height: 1.92 m (6 ft 3 1/2 in)
- Position: Goalkeeper

Youth career
- FC Spartak Schyolkovo

Senior career*
Years	Team	Apps	(Gls)
2000	FC Spartak-Zvezda Shchyolkovo (D4)		
2001–2006	FC Spartak Moscow	12	(0)
2002	→ FC Khimki (on loan)	0	(0)
2008–2009	FC Avangard Podolsk	17	(0)
2009–2010	FC Vityaz Podolsk	11	(0)
- * Club domestic league appearances and goals

Aleksei Aleksandrovich Zuev (Russian: Алексей Александрович Зуев; born 3 February 1981) is a Russian former association football goalkeeper.

== Club career ==
He made two appearances in 2006–07 UEFA Champions League.

== Personal life ==
On 3 March 2007 he was arrested for threatening a man with rubber-bullet gun and driving under the influence. Later blood test confirmed that he was drunk. Next day he was charged with hooliganism.
