= Clemente Rodríguez =

Argentine footballer

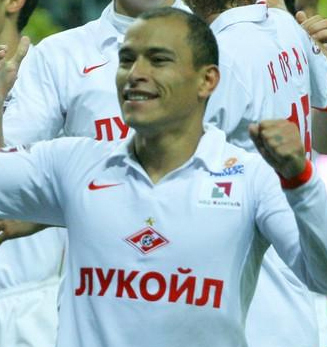
- Rodríguez with Spartak Moscow in 2008

Personal information
- Full name: Clemente Juan Rodríguez
- Date of birth: 31 July 1981 (age 45)
- Place of birth: Buenos Aires, Argentina
- Height: 1.67 m (5 ft 6 in)
- Position: Full-back

Youth career
- –2000: Los Andes

Senior career*
Years	Team	Apps	(Gls)
2000–2004	Boca Juniors	95	(5)
2004–2009	Spartak Moscow	71	(3)
2007	→ Boca Juniors (loan)	14	(2)
2007–2008	→ Espanyol (loan)	17	(0)
2009–2010	Estudiantes	27	(1)
2010–2013	Boca Juniors	73	(2)
2013–2015	São Paulo	3	(0)
2015–2019	Colón	63	(1)
2019–2020	Barracas Central	9	(0)
2020	Ciclon de Tárija		
2020	Deportivo Merlo	7	(0)
Total		379	(14)

International career
2004	Argentina Olympic		
2003–2013	Argentina	20	(0)
Medal record
Men's Football
Representing Argentina
Olympic Games
Gold medal – first place	2004 Athens	Team competition
- * Club domestic league appearances and goals

Clemente Juan Rodríguez (born 31 July 1981) is an Argentine former professional footballer. He was a right-footed player and could play on either flank, especially as a left back.

== Club career ==
Born in Buenos Aires, Rodríguez made his league debut for Boca Juniors in a 2–1 away defeat to Chacarita Juniors on 10 December 2000. He went on to establish himself as an important player in the Boca Juniors team that won a host of national and international tournament in the early 2000s. In 2003, he was part of the Boca team that won the Intercontinental Cup.

In 2004, he signed for Spartak Moscow, but returned to Boca on loan for the 2007 Clausura (spring championship). For the 2007–08 season he joined Spanish side Espanyol on loan.

In August 2009 he returned to Argentina to play for Estudiantes de La Plata. Subsequently, in August 2010, he returned for a third period with Boca Juniors.

On 24 June 2013, São Paulo signed Rodríguez to a two-year contract. On 7 April 2014, after almost one year playing for São Paulo, Rodríguez, along with Fabrício, was removed from the main staff of the club, and sent on loan to Boca Juniors. Rodríguez, who had a contract with the club until June 2015, will therefore no longer play for São Paulo.

Having announced his move to Bolivian club Ciclon de Tárija on 3 September 2020, it was revealed at the end of the same month, that Rodríguez had joined Deportivo Merlo.

== International career ==
Rodríguez was part of the gold medal winning Argentine Olympic football team at the 2004 Summer Olympics and has played for the full Argentina national team on an infrequent basis since 2003. He was called by coach Diego Maradona to play in the 2010 FIFA World Cup.

== Career statistics ==
Appearances and goals by national team and year
National team	Year	Apps	Goals
Argentina	2003	4	0
Argentina	2004	3	0
Argentina	2005	1	0
Argentina	2006	1	0
Argentina	2007	0	0
Argentina	2008	0	0
Argentina	2009	0	0
Argentina	2010	8	0
Argentina	2011	2	0
Argentina	2012	3	0
Argentina	2013	2	0
Argentina	Total	20	0

== Honours ==
Boca Juniors

- Primera División: 2000 Apertura, 2003 Apertura, 2011 Apertura
- Copa Libertadores: 2001, 2003, 2007
- Intercontinental Cup: 2003
- Copa Argentina: 2011–12

Argentina Olympic team

- Summer Olympics Gold Medal: 2004
- CONMEBOL Pre-Olympic Tournament: 2004

Argentina

- Copa América runner-up: 2004
