= Sergei Kabanov =

Russian footballer

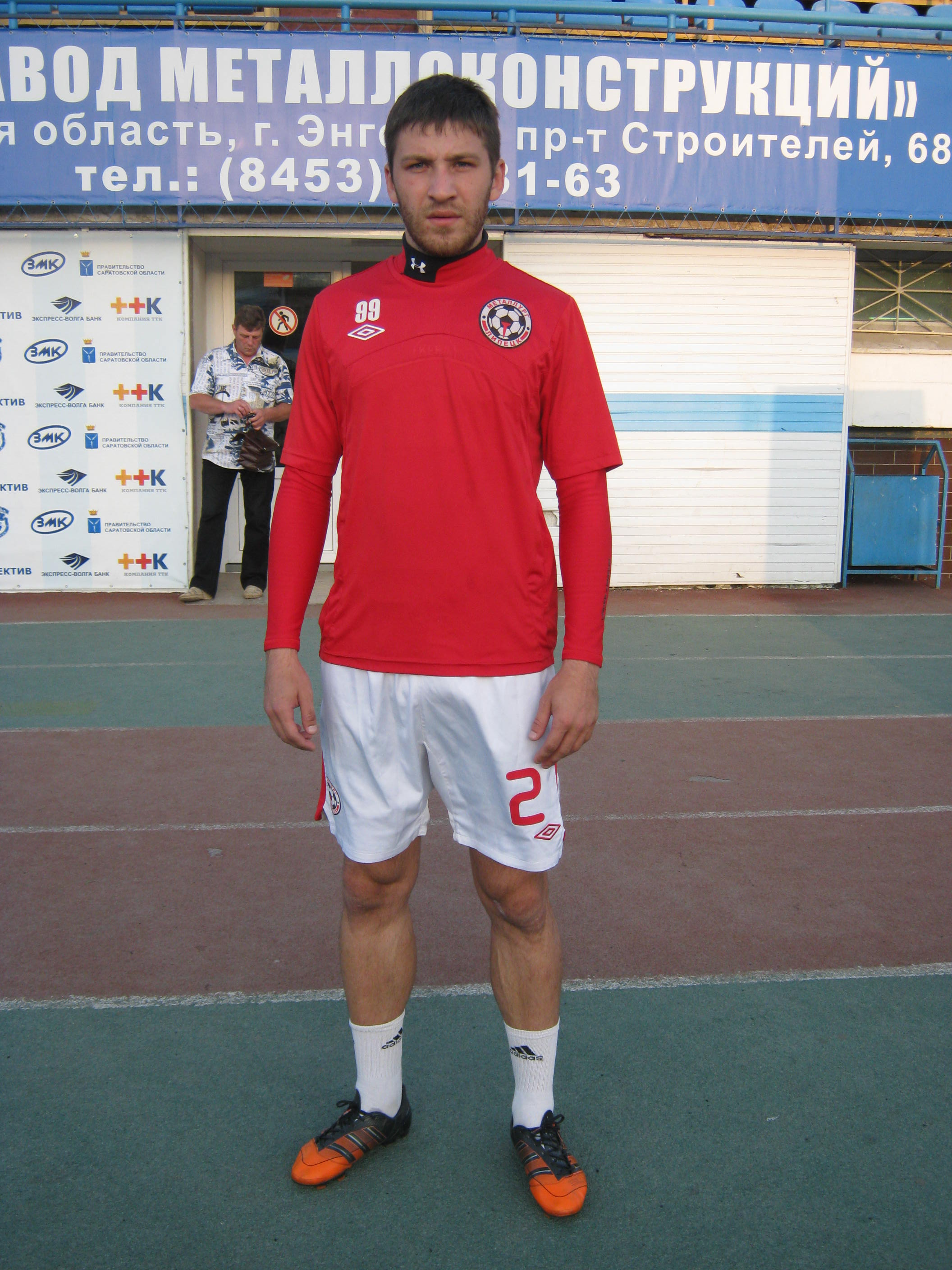

Personal information
- Full name: Sergei Borisovich Kabanov
- Date of birth: 15 March 1986 (age 40)
- Place of birth: Moscow, Russian SFSR
- Height: 1.86 m (6 ft 1 in)
- Position: Defender

Youth career
- FC Spartak Moscow

Senior career*
Years	Team	Apps	(Gls)
2002–2006	FC Spartak Moscow	1	(0)
2004	→ FC Dynamo Stavropol (loan)	8	(1)
2007–2008	FC Alania Vladikavkaz	51	(2)
2008	FC Tom Tomsk	1	(0)
2009	FC Shinnik Yaroslavl	15	(1)
2010	FC Volgar-Gazprom Astrakhan	6	(0)
2010	FC Torpedo Moscow	6	(0)
2011–2012	FC Metallurg Lipetsk	32	(1)
2012	FC Sever Murmansk	14	(1)
2013–2014	FC Zenit Penza	23	(1)
2014	FC Vybor-Kurbatovo Voronezh	7	(0)
- * Club domestic league appearances and goals

Sergei Borisovich Kabanov (Russian: Серге́й Борисович Кабанов; born 15 March 1986) is a former Russian footballer.

== Personal life ==
He is the younger brother of Maksim Kabanov.

== Honours ==
- Russian Premier League runner-up: 2006, 2007
- Russian Cup finalist: 2006
