= Luc Zoa =

Cameroonian footballer

Personal information
- Full name: Luc Owona Zoa
- Date of birth: 23 January 1979 (age 47)
- Place of birth: Yaoundé, Cameroon
- Height: 1.85 m (6 ft 1 in)
- Position: Defender

Senior career*
Years	Team	Apps	(Gls)
1997	Renaissance de Ngoumou		
1998	Victoria United Limbé		
1999	Cintra Yaoundé		
2000−2001	Coyotes de Saltillo		
2001−2003	Orlando Pirates	34	(0)
2004−2005	Spartak Moscow	3	(0)
2005	→ Anzhi Makhachkala (loan)	21	(1)
2006−2007	Anzhi Makhachkala	54	(0)
2011−2012	Persisam Putra Samarinda	26	(1)
Total		138	(2)
- * Club domestic league appearances and goals

Luc Owona Zoa (born January 23, 1979) is a former Cameroonian footballer.

== Career ==
Zoa played as a central defender for C.F. Monterrey's affiliate Coyotes de Saltillo in the Primera A until 2001. He also played in the Premier Soccer League for Orlando Pirates.

Zoa made three Russian Premier League appearances for FC Spartak Moscow, before going on loan to Russian First Division side FC Anzhi Makhachkala.

== Honours ==
=== Club honors ===
Orlando Pirates

- Premier Soccer League (1): 2002–03
