= Aleš Urbánek =

Czech footballer

Personal information
- Full name: Aleš Urbánek
- Date of birth: 25 May 1980 (age 46)
- Place of birth: Slavičín, Czechoslovakia
- Height: 1.80 m (5 ft 11 in)
- Position: Left back

Youth career
- 1990–1991: FC TVD Slavičín
- 1992–1993: MEZ Brumov
- 1993–1994: SK Sanov
- 1994–1995: FC Tescoma Zlín
- 1995–1996: SK LeRK Prostějov

Senior career*
| Years | Team | Apps | (Gls) |
| 1997–1998 | SK LeRK Prostějov | 25 | (1) |
| 1999–2003 | Sigma Olomouc | 124 | (13) |
| 2004 | Spartak Moscow | 7 | (0) |
| 2004–2005 | → Sparta Prague (loan) | 19 | (0) |
| 2005–2006 | → Artmedia Petržalka (loan) | 28 | (0) |
| 2006–2007 | → Slavia Prague (loan) | 10 | (0) |
| 2007–2010 | Artmedia Petržalka | 27 | (2) |
| 2010–2011 | 1. FC Slovácko | 32 | (0) |
| 2011 | Senica | 5 | (0) |
| 2012 | DAC Dunajská Streda | 11 | (0) |
| 2012–2013 | → Ružiná (loan) | 0 | (0) |

International career
| 1999–2001 | Czech Republic U-21 | 12 | (3) |
- * Club domestic league appearances and goals as of 28 July 2012

Aleš Urbánek (born 25 May 1980) is retired Czech footballer.

== Career ==
After leaving Sigma Olomouc, Urbanek played for Spartak Moscow in Russia but left after six months due to lack of playing time.
