= Aleksandr Laktionov (footballer) =

Russian footballer

Personal information
- Full name: Aleksandr Yuryevich Laktionov
- Date of birth: 28 May 1986 (age 40)
- Place of birth: Krasnozyorskoye, Novosibirsk Oblast, Russian SFSR, Soviet Union
- Height: 1.80 m (5 ft 11 in)
- Position: Forward

Senior career*
Years	Team	Apps	(Gls)
2003–2004	Chkalovets-Olimpik Novosibirsk	4	(0)
2005–2007	Spartak Moscow	0	(0)
2006	→ Aktobe (loan)	1	(0)
2007	→ Liepājas Metalurgs (loan)	5	(0)
2008–2009	Sportakademklub Moscow	11	(0)
2008	→ Nara-ShBFR Naro-Fominsk (loan)	11	(1)
2009	Radian-Baikal Irkutsk (amateur)		
2010	Torpedo-ZIL Moscow	29	(7)
2011	Tekstilshchik Ivanovo	20	(4)
2012	Istra	9	(0)
2012–2013	Arsenal Tula	17	(0)
2013	Dolgoprudny	12	(1)
2014	Yakutiya Yakutsk	14	(1)
2015	FC Rosich Moscow		
2016	Veles Moscow (amateur)		

Managerial career
- 2019–2021: Rodina Moscow (assistant)
- 2021: Rodina Moscow
- 2021–2023: Rodina-2 Moscow
- 2023: Rodina-2 Moscow (assistant)
- 2023–2024: Rodina-2 Moscow
- 2024: Rodina Moscow (assistant)
- 2024–2026: Rodina-2 Moscow
- * Club domestic league appearances and goals

Aleksandr Yuryevich Laktionov (Russian: Александр Юрьевич Лактионов; born 28 May 1986) is a football coach and a former midfielder from Russia.

== Career ==
Laktionov started his career at Spartak Moscow in 2005. In 2006, he was sent on loan to FC Aktobe on Kazakhstan and he was a part of their squad in the 2006 CIS Cup. In July 2007 he signed for Latvian Virslīga club Liepājas Metalurgs on loan, playing five games in the 2007 season.

== Personal life ==
His cousin Denis Laktionov was also a footballer who played for the Russia national team.
