= FC Chkalovets-Olimpik Novosibirsk =

- Full name: Football Club Chkalovets-Olimpik Novosibirsk
- Founded: 1999
- Dissolved: 2008

FC Chkalovets-Olimpik Novosibirsk (Russian: «Чкаловец-Олимпик» (Новосибирск)) was a Russian football team from Novosibirsk. It played professionally in the Russian Second Division from 2000 to 2003. Their best result was 6th place in the East Zone in 2000.
