= 2008 FC Spartak Moscow season =

Spartak Moscow
2008 season
- Manager: Stanislav Cherchesov (until September); Michael Laudrup (from 12 September)
- Stadium: Luzhniki Stadium
- Premier League: 8th
- Russian Cup: Progressed to 2009 season
- UEFA Champions League: Third Qualifying Round vs Dynamo Kyiv
- UEFA Cup: Group Stage
- Top goalscorer: League: Four Players (6); All: Nikita Bazhenov (8)

The 2008 FC Spartak Moscow season was the club's 17th season in the Russian Premier League season. Spartak finished the season in 8th while progressing to the Quarterfinals of the 2008–09 Russian Cup which took place during the 2009 season. In Europe, Spartak were knocked out of the UEFA Champions League by Dynamo Kyiv at the Third Qualifying round before dropping into the 2008–09 UEFA Cup where they finished 4th in their group.

== Season events ==
On 12 September, Spartak announced the appointment of Michael Laudrup as their new manager.

== Squad ==
As of match played 18 December 2008

No.	Name	Nationality	Position	Date of birth (age)	Signed from	Signed in	Contract ends	Apps.	Goals
Goalkeepers
12	Ivan Komissarov	(Russia)	GK	28 May 1988 (aged 20)	Youth Team	2005		0	0
16	Yevgeniy Gubin	(Russia)	GK	25 January 1989 (aged 19)	Youth Team	2005		0	0
22	Stipe Pletikosa	(Croatia)	GK	8 January 1979 (aged 29)	Shakhtar Donetsk	2007		73	0
35	Soslan Dzhanayev	(Russia)	GK	13 March 1987 (aged 21)	KAMAZ	2008		2	0
46	Azamat Jioyev	(Russia)	GK	6 January 1991 (aged 17)	Youth Team	2008		0	0
Defenders
3	Martin Stranzl	(Austria)	DF	16 June 1980 (aged 28)	VfB Stuttgart	2006		46	2
4	Malik Fathi	(Germany)	DF	29 October 1983 (aged 25)	Hertha BSC	2008	2011	27	4
7	Martin Jiránek	(Czech Republic)	DF	25 May 1979 (aged 29)	Reggina	2004		123	2
14	Clemente Rodríguez	(Argentina)	DF	31 July 1981 (aged 27)	Boca Juniors	2004		83	5
15	Radoslav Kováč	(Czech Republic)	DF	27 November 1979 (aged 29)	Sparta Prague	2005		133	13
33	Ilya Gultyayev	(Russia)	DF	5 September 1988 (aged 20)	Youth Team	2006		0	0
48	Yevgeni Makeyev	(Russia)	DF	24 July 1989 (aged 19)	Youth Team	2008		0	0
49	Roman Shishkin	(Russia)	DF	27 January 1987 (aged 21)	Youth Team	2004		86	1
53	Mikhail Badyautdinov	(Russia)	DF	11 October 1989 (aged 19)	Youth Team	2008		0	0
54	Aleksandr Karakin	(Russia)	DF	6 March 1991 (aged 17)	Youth Team	2008		0	0
56	Konstantin Kadeyev	(Russia)	DF	17 January 1989 (aged 19)	Youth Team	2008		0	0
59	Andrei Ivanov	(Russia)	DF	8 October 1988 (aged 20)	Youth Team	2006		24	0
65	Irakli Chezhiya	(Georgia (country))	DF	22 May 1992 (aged 16)	Youth Team	2008		0	0
70	Ignas Dedura	(Lithuania)	DF	6 January 1978 (aged 30)	Skonto	2004		45	4
88	Egor Filipenko	(Belarus)	DF	10 April 1988 (aged 20)	BATE Borisov	2008		17	0
Midfielders
5	Mozart	(Brazil)	MF	8 November 1980 (aged 28)	Reggina	2005		100	11
8	Aleksandr Pavlenko	(Russia)	MF	20 January 1985 (aged 23)	Lausanne-Sport	2001		138	16
19	Cristian Maidana	(Argentina)	MF	24 January 1987 (aged 21)	Banfield	2008		31	3
21	Igor Gorbatenko	(Russia)	MF	13 February 1989 (aged 19)	Krylia Sovetov-SOK Dimitrovgrad	2008		0	0
23	Vladimir Bystrov	(Russia)	MF	31 January 1984 (aged 24)	Zenit St.Petersburg	2005	2008	113	14
27	Serghei Covalciuc	(Moldova)	MF	20 January 1982 (aged 26)	Karpaty Lviv	2004		79	3
30	Ivan Saenko	(Russia)	MF	17 October 1983 (aged 25)	1. FC Nürnberg	2008		15	1
31	Sergei Parshivlyuk	(Russia)	MF	18 March 1989 (aged 19)	Youth Team	2007		29	0
37	Yehor Luhachov	(Ukraine)	MF	24 December 1988 (aged 19)	Lokomotyv Kyiv	2006		2	0
38	Artur Maloyan	(Russia)	MF	4 February 1989 (aged 19)	Youth Team	2007		5	0
41	Artak Aleksanyan	(Armenia)	MF	10 March 1991 (aged 17)	Youth Team	2008		0	0
43	Aleksandr Zotov	(Russia)	MF	27 August 1990 (aged 18)	Youth Team	2008		4	0
45	Aleksandr Kozhevnikov	(Russia)	MF	18 April 1990 (aged 18)	Youth Team	2008		0	0
47	Dmitri Malyaka	(Russia)	MF	15 January 1990 (aged 18)	Youth Team	2008		0	0
57	Maksim Grigoryev	(Russia)	MF	6 July 1990 (aged 18)	Youth Team	2008		2	0
58	Dmitri Tumenko	(Russia)	MF	4 May 1989 (aged 19)	Youth Team	2008		0	0
61	Igor Kireyev	(Russia)	MF	17 February 1992 (aged 16)	Youth Team	2008		0	0
90	Vladislav Ryzhkov	(Russia)	MF	28 February 1990 (aged 18)	Youth Team	2008		8	2
96	Konstantin Sovetkin	(Russia)	MF	19 February 1989 (aged 19)	Youth Team	2008		6	0
Forwards
11	Welliton	(Brazil)	FW	22 October 1986 (aged 22)	Goiás	2007		24	10
17	Artyom Fomin	(Russia)	FW	8 July 1988 (aged 20)	Youth Team	2006		0	0
18	Aleksandr Prudnikov	(Russia)	FW	26 February 1989 (aged 19)	Youth Team	2007		42	6
32	Nikita Bazhenov	(Russia)	FW	1 February 1985 (aged 23)	Saturn Ramenskoye	2004		94	19
40	Artem Dzyuba	(Russia)	FW	22 August 1988 (aged 20)	Youth Team	2006		49	8
44	Pavel Yakovlev	(Russia)	FW	7 April 1991 (aged 17)	Youth Team	2008		0	0
62	Vladimir Obukhov	(Uzbekistan)	FW	8 February 1992 (aged 16)	Youth Team	2008		0	0
Away on loan
29	Amir Bazhev	(Russia)	MF	15 October 1988 (aged 20)	Youth Team	2006		1	0
34	Renat Sabitov	(Russia)	DF	13 June 1985 (aged 23)	Saturn Ramenskoye	2007		21	0
36	Fyodor Kudryashov	(Russia)	DF	5 April 1987 (aged 21)	Sibiryak Bratsk	2005		12	0
55	Oleg Dineyev	(Russia)	MF	30 October 1987 (aged 21)	Youth Team	2007		4	0
	Quincy Owusu-Abeyie	(Netherlands)	FW	15 April 1986 (aged 22)	Arsenal	2006		32	1
Players that left Spartak Moscow during the season
6	Florin Șoavă	(Romania)	MF	24 July 1978 (aged 30)	Rapid București	2004	2008	64	1
9	Yegor Titov	(Russia)	MF	29 May 1976 (aged 32)	Youth Team	1995		445	106
10	Roman Pavlyuchenko	(Russia)	FW	15 December 1981 (aged 27)	Rotor Volgograd	2003		180	82
25	Maksym Kalynychenko	(Ukraine)	MF	26 January 1979 (aged 29)	Dnipro Dnipropetrovsk	2000		196	32
42	Sergei Harlamov	(Russia)	DF	24 January 1991 (aged 17)	Youth Team	2008	2008	0	0
52	Yevgeni Andreyev	(Russia)	MF	11 March 1988 (aged 20)	Youth Team	2005		0	0

=== On loan ===
Note: Flags indicate national team as defined under FIFA eligibility rules; some limited exceptions apply. Players may hold more than one non-FIFA nationality.

No.	Pos.	Nation	Player
29	MF	RUS	Amir Bazhev (at SKA Rostov)
34	DF	RUS	Renat Sabitov (at Khimki)
36	DF	RUS	Fyodor Kudryashov (at Khimki)

No.	Pos.	Nation	Player
55	MF	RUS	Oleg Dineyev (at Khimki)
—	FW	NED	Quincy Owusu-Abeyie (at Birmingham City)

=== Left club during season ===
Note: Flags indicate national team as defined under FIFA eligibility rules; some limited exceptions apply. Players may hold more than one non-FIFA nationality.

No.	Pos.	Nation	Player
6	MF	ROU	Florin Șoavă (to Khimki)
9	MF	RUS	Yegor Titov (to Khimki)
10	FW	RUS	Roman Pavlyuchenko (to Tottenham Hotspur)

No.	Pos.	Nation	Player
25	MF	UKR	Maksym Kalynychenko (to Dnipro Dnipropetrovsk)
52	MF	RUS	Yevgeni Andreyev (to Irtysh Omsk)

== Transfers ==
=== In ===
Date	Position	Nationality	Name	From	Fee	Ref.
Winter 2008	GK	(Russia)	Soslan Dzhanayev	KAMAZ	Undisclosed	
Winter 2008	DF	(Belarus)	Egor Filipenko	BATE Borisov	Undisclosed	
Winter 2008	MF	(Argentina)	Cristian Maidana	Banfield	Undisclosed	
Winter 2008	MF	(Russia)	Igor Gorbatenko	Krylia Sovetov-SOK Dimitrovgrad	Undisclosed	
12 March 2008	DF	(Germany)	Malik Fathi	Hertha BSC	Undisclosed	
August 2008	MF	(Russia)	Ivan Saenko	1. FC Nürnberg	Undisclosed	

=== Out ===
Date	Position	Nationality	Name	To	Fee	Ref.
September 2008	FW	(Russia)	Roman Pavlyuchenko	Tottenham Hotspur	Undisclosed	
Summer 2008	MF	(Romania)	Florin Șoavă	Khimki	Undisclosed	
Summer 2008	MF	(Russia)	Yevgeni Andreyev	Irtysh Omsk	Undisclosed	

=== Loans out ===
Date from	Position	Nationality	Name	To	Date to	Ref.
22 June 2007	DF	(Argentina)	Clemente Rodríguez	Espanyol	Summer 2008	
2 September 2007	FW	(Netherlands)	Quincy Owusu-Abeyie	Celta Vigo	Summer 2008	
19 June 2008	DF	(Russia)	Renat Sabitov	Khimki	End of Season	
July 2008	DF	(Russia)	Fyodor Kudryashov	Khimki	End of Season	
6 August 2008	FW	(Netherlands)	Quincy Owusu-Abeyie	Birmingham City	January 2009	
27 August 2008	DF	(Russia)	Amir Bazhev	SKA Rostov	End of Season	
Summer 2008	DF	(Russia)	Oleg Dineyev	Khimki	End of Season	

=== Released ===
Date	Position	Nationality	Name	Joined	Date
Summer 2008	MF	(Russia)	Yegor Titov	Khimki	11 August 2008
Summer 2008	MF	(Ukraine)	Maksym Kalynychenko	Dnipro Dnipropetrovsk	8 August 2008
31 December 2008	DF	(Russia)	Aleksandr Karakin	Dynamo Moscow	
31 December 2008	MF	(Armenia)	Artak Aleksanyan	Pyunik	

== Competitions ==
=== Premier League ===
==== Results by round ====
Round	1	2	3	4	5	6	7	8	9	10	11	12	13	14	15	16	17	18	19	20	21	22	23	24	25	26	27	28	29	30
Ground	A	H	A	H	A	A	H	A	H	A	H	A	H	A	H	A	H	A	H	H	A	H	A	H	A	H	A	H	A	H
Result	D	W	D	D	L	W	D	W	W	D	W	L	L	D	W	W	D	D	D	W	L	L	W	L	D	W	W	L	D	L

Updated to match(es) played on 22 November 2008. Source: See Results
A = Away; H = Home; W = Win; D = Draw; L = Loss

==== Results ====
16 March 2008 1	Zenit St.Petersburg	0 – 0	Spartak Moscow	Saint Petersburg
16:00 MSK (UTC+3)	Pogrebnyak (yellow card) 22'; Šírl (yellow card) 27'; Fayzulin (yellow card) 62'	Report	Mozart (yellow card) 7'; Stranzl (yellow card) 24'; Covalciuc (yellow card) 38'	Stadium: Petrovsky Stadium; Attendance: 22,500; Referee: Aleksandr Gvardis

22 March 2008 2	Spartak Moscow	1 – 0	Tom Tomsk	Moscow
18:30 MSK (UTC+3)	Welliton 31'; Fathi (yellow card) 69'; Prudnikov (yellow card) 82'	Report	Bugayev (yellow card) 16'; Klimov (yellow card) 45+'; Tarasov (yellow card) 72'; Arkhipov (yellow card) 86'	Stadium: Luzhniki Stadium; Attendance: 25,000; Referee: Vitali Doroshenko

29 March 2008 3	Khimki	3 – 3	Spartak Moscow	Khimki
16:45 MSK (UTC+3)	Nizamutdinov 7', 52'; Drozdov (yellow card) 15'; Čeh 30' (yellow card) 51'; Trivunović (yellow card) 68'; Mijailović (yellow card) 76'; Nikiforov (yellow card) 90'	Report	Fathi (yellow card) 2'; Welliton 5' (yellow card) 90'; Dedura (yellow card) 26' (goal) 90+'; Mozart (yellow card) 30' (yellow-red card) 90+'; Pavlenko (yellow card) 33'; Parshivlyuk (yellow card) 39'; Jiránek (yellow card) 55'; Pavlyuchenko 70' (pen.)	Stadium: Rodina Stadium; Attendance: 10,000; Referee: Igor Egorov

6 April 2008 4	Spartak Moscow	1 – 1	Amkar Perm	Moscow
19:00 MSK (DST) (UTC+4)	Pavlyuchenko 61'	Report	Sirakov (yellow card) 73'; Belorukov (yellow card) 82'; Injac 90'	Stadium: Luzhniki Stadium; Attendance: 31,000; Referee: Vladimir Pettay

13 April 2008 5	Dynamo Moscow	4 – 3	Spartak Moscow	Moscow
16:00 MSK (DST) (UTC+4)	Kolodin (yellow card) 3'; Genkov 15', 68' (yellow card) 17'; Danny 32', 70'	Report	Bystrov 16'; Welliton (yellow card) 30' (goal) 78'; Stranzl (yellow card) 34'; Pavlyuchenko (yellow card) 41' (yellow-red card) 45'; Pavlenko (yellow card) 49' (goal) 64'	Stadium: Dynamo Stadium; Attendance: 30,000; Referee: Stanislav Sukhina

19 April 2008 6	Spartak Nalchik	1 – 2	Spartak Moscow	Nalchik
19:00 MSK (DST) (UTC+4)	Geteriev 39'; Džudović (yellow card) 57'; Gogua (yellow card) 68'; Mashukov (yellow card) 90'	Report	Pletikosa (yellow card) 40'; Maidana 42' (yellow card) 76'; Sabitov (yellow card) 50'; Welliton 57'; Bazhenov (yellow card) 70'	Stadium: Spartak Stadium; Attendance: 13,200; Referee: Vladislav Bezborodov

27 April 2008 7	Spartak Moscow	1 – 1	FC Moscow	Moscow
16:00 MSK (DST) (UTC+4)	Fathi (yellow card) 13' (yellow-red card) 90+'; Pavlenko 55'	Report	Adamov (yellow card) 67'; Bracamonte 69'	Stadium: Luzhniki Stadium; Attendance: 23,000; Referee: Aleksei Nikolaev

3 May 2008 8	Rubin Kazan	0 – 3	Spartak Moscow	Kazan
MSK (DST) (UTC+4)	Semak (yellow card) 30'; Kvirkvelia (yellow card) 62'; Balyaikin (yellow card) 78'	Report	Welliton 20' (yellow card) 30'; Mozart (yellow card) 24'; Bazhenov 65'; Pavlenko 69'	Stadium: Central Stadium; Attendance: 28,500; Referee: Nikolai Ivanov

7 May 2008 9	Spartak Moscow	4 – 2	Shinnik Yaroslavl	Moscow
MSK (DST) (UTC+4)	Mozart 14' (pen.); Silva 34' (o.g.); Welliton 64'; Pavlyuchenko 79'	Report	Monaryov 11'; Đorđević (yellow card) 15' (yellow-red card) 45+'; Laizāns (yellow card) 19'; Silva 61'; Khazov (yellow card) 75'; Stepanov (yellow card) 76'; Kudryashov (red card) 78'	Stadium: Lokomotiv Stadium; Attendance: 10,000; Referee: Vitali Doroshenko

11 May 2008 10	Krylia Sovetov	1 – 1	Spartak Moscow	Samara
16:00 MSK (DST) (UTC+4)	Escobar 40' (yellow card) 71'	Report	Maidana 45'; Covalciuc (yellow card) 60'; Welliton (yellow card) 64'; Stranzl (yellow card) 71'; Bazhenov (yellow card) 75'	Stadium: Metallurg Stadium; Attendance: 33,000; Referee: Stanislav Sukhina

15 May 2008 11	Spartak Moscow	1 – 0	Saturn Ramenskoye	Moscow
19:00 MSK (DST) (UTC+4)	Kováč (yellow card) 35'; Bazhenov (yellow card) 41'; Pavlyuchenko 90' (pen.)	Report	Karyaka (yellow card) 66'; Nakhushev (yellow card) 72'; Husin (yellow card) 89'	Stadium: Lokomotiv Stadium; Attendance: 12,000; Referee: Aleksei Nikolaev

6 July 2008 12	Terek Grozny	3 – 1	Spartak Moscow	Grozny
14:00 MSK (DST) (UTC+4)	Iliev (yellow card) 21'; Dzhabrailov 53'; Bouli 57'; Kuzmichyov 66'; Kulik (yellow card) 82'	Report	Kalynychenko 36'; Pavlyuchenko (yellow card) 90'	Stadium: Sultan Bilimkhanov Stadium; Attendance: 9,650; Referee: Stanislav Sukhina

12 July 2008 13	Spartak Moscow	1 – 5	CSKA Moscow	Moscow
16:00 MSK (DST) (UTC+4)	Mozart (yellow card) 50'; Kováč (yellow card) 63'; Bazhenov 68'	Report	Vágner Love 15', 34', 44'; Krasić 51'; Erkin 77'	Stadium: Luzhniki Stadium; Attendance: 45,000; Referee: Yuri Baskakov

19 July 2008 14	Lokomotiv Moscow	2 – 2	Spartak Moscow	Moscow
16:00 MSK (DST) (UTC+4)	Bilyaletdinov 23' (yellow card) 52'; Sychev 42'; Rodolfo (yellow card) 60'; Traoré (yellow card) 77'	Report	Bazhenov (yellow card) 65' (goal) 90+'; Pavlyuchenko (yellow card) 70' (goal) 72'; Kováč (yellow card) 73'; Prudnikov (yellow card) 87'	Stadium: Lokomotiv Stadium; Attendance: 23,783; Referee: Igor Zakharov

27 July 2008 15	Spartak Moscow	3 – 0	Luch-Energiya Vladivostok	Moscow
18:00 MSK (DST) (UTC+4)	Kováč 39'; Pavlyuchenko (penalty missed) 55'; Prudnikov 66'; Mozart 89' (pen.)	Report	Lukačević (yellow card) 33'; Streltsov (yellow card) 65'; Vujović (yellow card) 74'; Čech (red card) 87'	Stadium: Luzhniki Stadium; Attendance: 14,500; Referee: Vladislav Bezborodov

2 August 2008 16	Tom Tomsk	0 – 1	Spartak Moscow	Tomsk
15:00 MSK (DST) (UTC+4)	Kharitonov (yellow card) 10'; Vejić (yellow card) 56'; Stoica (yellow card) 59'; Kontsedalov (yellow card) 78'; Arkhipov (yellow card) 82'	Report	Fathi 10'; Prudnikov (yellow card) 65'; Pletikosa (yellow card) 71'	Stadium: Trud Stadium; Attendance: 15,000; Referee: Vladimir Pettay

9 August 2008 17	Spartak Moscow	1 – 1	Khimki	Moscow
19:00 MSK (DST) (UTC+4)	Pavlyuchenko 20'; Filipenko (yellow card) 50'	Report	Șoavă (yellow card) 45'; Blatnjak 71'	Stadium: Luzhniki Stadium; Attendance: 10,000; Referee: Aleksandr Gvardis

17 August 2008 18	Amkar Perm	1 – 1	Spartak Moscow	Perm
17:00 MSK (DST) (UTC+4)	Volkov 15' (yellow card) 15'; Belorukov (yellow card) 44'	Report	Bazhenov 9'; Maidana (yellow card) 60'; Filipenko (yellow card) 84'; Mozart (yellow card) 90+'	Stadium: Zvezda Stadium; Attendance: 18,500; Referee: Alexei Kovalev

23 August 2008 19	Spartak Moscow	1 – 1	Dynamo Moscow	Moscow
18:00 MSK (DST) (UTC+4)	Jiránek (yellow card) 21'; Sovetkin (yellow card) 73'; Dzyuba 79'; Saenko (yellow card) 86'; Kováč (yellow card) 90'	Report	Kerzhakov 23'; Granat (yellow card) 77'; Danny (yellow card) 85'; Tanasijević (yellow card) 90+'	Stadium: Luzhniki Stadium; Attendance: 19,000; Referee: Maksim Layushkin

31 August 2008 20	Spartak Moscow	2 – 1	Spartak Nalchik	Moscow
20:00 MSK (DST) (UTC+4)	Fathi (yellow card) 26' (goal) 61'; Jiránek (yellow card) 32'; Saenko (yellow card) 55'; Shishkin (yellow card) 87'; Dzhanayev (yellow card) 90+'; Prudnikov 90+'	Report	Yatchenko (yellow card) 44'; Frunză (yellow card) 50'; Filatov (yellow card) 59'; Džudović (yellow card) 68'; Kisenkov (yellow card) 74'; Gogua 90+'	Stadium: Luzhniki Stadium; Attendance: 6,000; Referee: Stanislav Sukhina

13 September 2008 21	FC Moscow	2 – 1	Spartak Moscow	Moscow
14:00 MSK (DST) (UTC+4)	Nababkin (yellow card) 21'; Bystrov (yellow card) 32'; Bracamonte 53' (pen.); Ivanov 63'; Goore (yellow card) 90+'	Report	Mozart (penalty missed) 4' (yellow card) 58'; Ryzhkov 15'; Filipenko (yellow card) 26'; Kováč (yellow card) 26'; Saenko (yellow card) 66'	Stadium: Eduard Streltsov Stadium; Attendance: 7,000; Referee: Igor Zakharov

21 September 2008 22	Spartak Moscow	0 – 1	Rubin Kazan	Moscow
18:00 MSK (DST) (UTC+4)	Saenko (yellow card) 24'; Bystrov (yellow card) 90+'	Report	Rebrov 15'; Bukharov (yellow card) 27'; Ryazantsev (yellow card) 70'; Kvirkvelia (yellow card) 76'	Stadium: Luzhniki Stadium; Attendance: 17,000; Referee: Nikolai Ivanov

27 September 2008 23	Shinnik Yaroslavl	1 – 2	Spartak Moscow	Yaroslavl
15:00 MSK (DST) (UTC+4)	Monaryov 61'; Boyarintsev (yellow card) 65'; Polovinchuk (yellow card) 74'	Report	Rodríguez 21'; Fathi 39'	Stadium: Shinnik Stadium; Attendance: 17,900; Referee: Stanislav Sukhina

4 October 2008 24	Spartak Moscow	0 – 1	Krylia Sovetov	Moscow
MSK (DST) (UTC+4)	Bystrov (yellow card) 30' (yellow-red card) 80'; Parshivlyuk (yellow card) 38'; Kováč (yellow card) 48'; Mozart (yellow card) 65' (yellow-red card) 88'; Fathi (yellow card) 76'	Report	Booth (yellow card) 70'; Ivanov 74'	Stadium: Luzhniki Stadium; Attendance: 15,500; Referee: Aleksandr Gvardis

18 October 2008 25	Saturn Ramenskoye	0 – 0	Spartak Moscow	Ramenskoye
19:00 MSK (DST) (UTC+4)	Zelão (yellow card) 27'; Kovel (yellow card) 90+'	Report	Saenko (yellow card) 32'; Dedura (yellow card) 50'; Kováč (yellow card) 90+'	Stadium: Saturn Stadium; Attendance: 13,200; Referee: Vladimir Pettay

25 October 2008 26	Spartak Moscow	3 – 1	Terek Grozny	Moscow
16:00 MSK (DST) (UTC+4)	Pavlenko 45+1' (pen.); Bazhenov 58'; Kováč 61'	Report	Kuzmichyov (yellow card) 14' (goal) 74'; Amelyanchuk (yellow card) 45+1'; Mărgăritescu (yellow card) 68'	Stadium: Luzhniki Stadium; Attendance: 11,000; Referee: Vitali Doroshenko

1 November 2008 27	CSKA Moscow	0 – 1	Spartak Moscow	Moscow
16:00 MSK (UTC+3)	Zhirkov (yellow card) 84' (yellow-red card) 84'; Šemberas (yellow card) 90'	Report	Rodríguez (yellow card) 41'; Bazhenov 56'; Parshivlyuk (yellow card) 67'	Stadium: Luzhniki Stadium; Attendance: 60,000; Referee: Aleksei Nikolaev

8 November 2008 28	Spartak Moscow	0 – 1	Lokomotiv Moscow	Moscow
MSK (UTC+3)	Prudnikov (yellow card) 26'; Kováč (yellow card) 75'	Report	Mujiri 6'; Baša (yellow card) 9'	Stadium: Luzhniki Stadium; Attendance: 21,000; Referee: Stanislav Sukhina

16 November 2008 29	Luch-Energiya Vladivostok	2 – 2	Spartak Moscow	Vladivostok
14:00 MSK (UTC+3)	Kulyomin (yellow card) 56'; Gvazava 67'; Bulyga 83'	Report	Pavlenko 4'; Maidana 89'	Stadium: Dynamo Stadium; Attendance: 7,500; Referee: Vitali Doroshenko

22 November 2008 30	Spartak Moscow	1 – 3	Zenit St.Petersburg	Moscow
14:00 MSK (UTC+3)	Fathi (yellow card) 29'; Covalciuc (yellow card) 32'; Pavlenko 47'	Report	Pogrebnyak 5'; Danny 19', 45+1'; Anyukov (yellow card) 23'	Stadium: Luzhniki Stadium; Attendance: 30,000; Referee: Igor Egorov

==== League table ====
Pos	Team	Pld	W	D	L	GF	GA	GD	Pts	Qualification or relegation
6	Krylia Sovetov Samara	30	12	12	6	46	28	+18	48 (Note: Zenit St. Petersburg ahead of Krylia Sovetov on head-to-head points; Zenit St. Petersburg–Krylia Sovetov 1–1, Krylia Sovetov–Zenit St. Petersburg 0–3.)	Qualification to Europa League third qualifying round (Note: Since both finalists of the 2008–09 Russian Cup qualified for the 2009–10 UEFA Champions League, Krylia Sovetov earned a spot in the third qualifying round of the 2009–10 UEFA Europa League.)
7	Lokomotiv Moscow	30	13	8	9	37	32	+5	47	
8	Spartak Moscow	30	11	11	8	43	39	+4	44	
9	FC Moscow	30	9	11	10	34	36	−2	38	
10	Terek Grozny	30	9	8	13	28	42	−14	35	

Source: RFPL (in Russian)
Rules for classification: 1st points; 2nd matches won; 3rd head-to-head (points, matches won, goal difference, goals scored, away goals scored); 4th goal difference; 5th goals scored; 6th away goals scored; 7th position in previous season or decision game

=== Russian Cup ===
6 August 2008 Last 32	Dynamo Bryansk	1 – 2	Spartak Moscow	Bryansk
18:30 MSK (DST) (UTC+4)	Kulumbegov 14' (pen.); Tolstykh (yellow card) 39' (yellow-red card) 68'; Spirin (yellow card) 46'; Sannikov (yellow card) 79'; Larin (yellow card) 83'	Report	Dzyuba 4' (pen.), 31'; Luhachov (yellow card) 5'; Shishkin (yellow card) 34' (yellow-red card) 80'; Dzhanayev (yellow card) 74'; Prudnikov (yellow card) 89'	Stadium: Dynamo Stadium; Attendance: 10,000; Referee: Nikolai Ivanov

24 September 2008 Last 16	Shinnik Yaroslavl	1 – 2	Spartak Moscow	Yaroslavl
18:30 MSK (DST) (UTC+4)	Kudryashov 57'; Yashin (yellow card) 81'	Report	Maidana (yellow card) 42'; Ryzhkov 45'; Prudnikov 49'	Stadium: Shinnik; Attendance: 11,200; Referee: Yuri Klyuchnikov (Rostov-on-Don)

The Quartfinal took place during the 2009 season.

=== UEFA Champions League ===
==== Qualifying rounds ====
13 August 2008 Third Qualifying Round 1st leg (Spartak Moscow–Dynamo Kyiv rivalry)	Spartak Moscow (Russia)	1 – 4	(Ukraine) Dynamo Kyiv	Moscow, Russia
20:00 MSK (DST) (UTC+4)	Bazhenov 5'; Kováč (yellow card) 69'	Report	Nesmachniy (yellow card) 22'; Bangoura 28', 47' (yellow card) 72'; Ninković (yellow card) 31'; Milevskyi 45', 86'	Stadium: Luzhniki Stadium; Attendance: 32,600; Referee: Martin Hansson (Sweden)

27 August 2008 Third Qualifying Round 2nd leg	Dynamo Kyiv (Ukraine)	4 – 1 (8 – 2 agg.)	(Russia) Spartak Moscow	Kyiv, Ukraine
21:45 MSK (DST) (UTC+4)	Aliyev 4'; El Kaddouri (yellow card) 7'; Bangoura 24'; Yussuf (yellow card) 37'; Milevskyi 49', 78'	Report	Pavlenko (yellow card) 45'; Dzyuba 47'	Stadium: Valeriy Lobanovskyi Dynamo Stadium; Attendance: 15,000; Referee: Roberto Rosetti (Italy)

=== UEFA Cup ===
==== First round ====
18 September 2008 1st leg	Baník Ostrava (Czech Republic)	0 – 1	(Russia) Spartak Moscow	Ostrava, Spain
20:45 MSK (DST) (UTC+4)	Řezník (yellow card) 67'	Report	Kováč (yellow card) 42'; Fathi 56'; Bystrov (yellow card) 68'; Pletikosa (yellow card) 90'	Stadium: Bazaly; Attendance: 4,120; Referee: Aleksandar Stavrev (Macedonia)

2 October 2008 2nd leg	Spartak Moscow (Russia)	1 – 1 (2 – 1 agg.)	(Czech Republic) Baník Ostrava	Moscow, Russia
18:00 MSK (DST) (UTC+4)	Bazhenov 3'; Kováč (yellow card) 59'	Report	Otepka 32'; Neuwirth (yellow card) 74'; Bolf (yellow card) 85'	Stadium: Luzhniki Stadium; Attendance: 18,000; Referee: Tony Asumaa (Finland)

==== Group stage ====
Team	Pld	W	D	L	GF	GA	GD	Pts
(Italy) Udinese	4	3	0	1	6	4	+2	9
(England) Tottenham Hotspur	4	2	1	1	7	4	+3	7
(Netherlands) NEC	4	2	0	2	6	5	+1	6
(Russia) Spartak Moscow	4	1	1	2	5	6	−1	4
(Croatia) Dinamo Zagreb	4	1	0	3	4	9	−5	3

6 November 2008 1	Spartak Moscow (Russia)	1 – 2	(Italy) Udinese	Moscow, Russia
20:00 MSK (UTC+3)	Rodríguez 17'	Report	Quagliarella 12', 60' (pen.); Pasquale (yellow card) 40' (yellow-red card) 87'; Flores (yellow card) 90'	Stadium: Luzhniki Stadium; Attendance: 12,000; Referee: Kristinn Jakobsson (Iceland)

27 November 2008 2	Dinamo Zagreb (Croatia)	0 – 1	(Russia) Spartak Moscow	Zagreb, Croatia
22:45 MSK (UTC+3)	Vrdoljak (yellow card) 44'; Bišćan (yellow card) 58'; Mandžukić (yellow card) 90'	Report	Parshivlyuk (yellow card) 48'; Kováč (yellow card) 68'; Saenko 75' (yellow card) 90'	Stadium: Maksimir Stadium; Attendance: 12,000; Referee: Thorsten Kinhöfer (Germany)

3 December 2008 3	Spartak Moscow (Russia)	1 – 2	(Netherlands) NEC	Moscow, Russia
20:00 MSK (UTC+3)	Covalciuc 2'; Zotov (yellow card) 16'; Jiránek (yellow card) 27'; Ivanov (yellow card) 52'	Report	Sibum (yellow card) 35'; Van Beukering 84'; Schöne 87'	Stadium: Luzhniki Stadium; Attendance: 12,000; Referee: Nicolai Vollquartz (Denmark)

18 December 2008 4	Tottenham Hotspur (England)	2 – 2	(Russia) Spartak Moscow	London, England
22:45 MSK (UTC+3)	Modrić 67'; Huddlestone 74'	Report	Dzyuba 23', 33'	Stadium: White Hart Lane; Attendance: 28,906; Referee: Pedro Proença (Portugal)

== Squad statistics ==
As of match played 18 December 2008

=== Appearances and goals ===
No.	Pos	Nat	Player	Total		Premier League		2008-09 Russian Cup		UEFA Champions League		UEFA Cup	
No.	Pos	Nat	Player	Apps	Goals	Apps	Goals	Apps	Goals	Apps	Goals	Apps	Goals
3	DF	(Austria) AUT	Martin Stranzl	19	0	16+1	0	1	0	1	0	0	0
4	DF	(Germany) GER	Malik Fathi	27	4	21	3	0	0	1	0	5	1
5	MF	(Brazil) BRA	Mozart	26	2	19+2	2	1	0	2	0	2	0
7	DF	(Czech Republic) CZE	Martin Jiránek	33	0	26	0	0	0	2	0	5	0
8	MF	(Russia) RUS	Aleksandr Pavlenko	26	6	16+4	6	0+1	0	0+1	0	3+1	0
11	FW	(Brazil) BRA	Welliton	10	6	9+1	6	0	0	0	0	0	0
14	DF	(Argentina) ARG	Clemente Rodríguez	16	2	8+2	1	1	0	0	0	5	1
15	DF	(Czech Republic) CZE	Radoslav Kováč	28	2	18+3	2	1	0	2	0	4	0
18	FW	(Russia) RUS	Aleksandr Prudnikov	28	3	10+11	2	2	1	0	0	4+1	0
19	MF	(Argentina) ARG	Cristian Maidana	31	3	17+7	3	2	0	1+1	0	1+2	0
22	GK	(Croatia) CRO	Stipe Pletikosa	38	0	30	0	0	0	2	0	6	0
23	MF	(Russia) RUS	Vladimir Bystrov	29	1	18+6	1	0	0	2	0	2+1	0
27	MF	(Moldova) MDA	Serghei Covalciuc	21	1	14+3	0	1	0	0	0	3	1
30	MF	(Russia) RUS	Ivan Saenko	15	1	5+3	0	1	0	0+1	0	5	1
31	MF	(Russia) RUS	Sergei Parshivlyuk	27	0	17+1	0	1+1	0	1	0	5+1	0
32	FW	(Russia) RUS	Nikita Bazhenov	31	8	18+4	6	1+1	0	2	1	4+1	1
35	GK	(Russia) RUS	Soslan Dzhanayev	2	0	0	0	2	0	0	0	0	0
37	MF	(Ukraine) UKR	Yehor Luhachov	2	0	0+1	0	1	0	0	0	0	0
38	MF	(Russia) RUS	Artur Maloyan	5	0	0+2	0	0	0	0	0	2+1	0
40	FW	(Russia) RUS	Artem Dzyuba	21	6	6+10	1	1	2	1+1	1	1+1	2
43	MF	(Russia) RUS	Aleksandr Zotov	4	0	1	0	0	0	0	0	1+2	0
49	DF	(Russia) RUS	Roman Shishkin	20	0	11+2	0	1	0	2	0	4	0
57	MF	(Russia) RUS	Maksim Grigoryev	2	0	0	0	0	0	0	0	0+2	0
59	DF	(Russia) RUS	Andrei Ivanov	15	0	6+6	0	1	0	1	0	0+1	0
70	DF	(Lithuania) LTU	Ignas Dedura	9	1	6	1	1	0	0+1	0	1	0
88	DF	(Belarus) BLR	Egor Filipenko	17	0	10+1	0	2	0	1+1	0	2	0
90	MF	(Russia) RUS	Vladislav Ryzhkov	8	2	3+2	1	1	1	0	0	1+1	0
96	MF	(Russia) RUS	Konstantin Sovetkin	6	0	3+1	0	0+2	0	0	0	0	0
Players away from the club on loan:
29	MF	(Russia) RUS	Amir Bazhev	1	0	0	0	0+1	0	0	0	0	0
34	DF	(Russia) RUS	Renat Sabitov	3	0	2+1	0	0	0	0	0	0	0
36	DF	(Russia) RUS	Fyodor Kudryashov	1	0	0+1	0	0	0	0	0	0	0
55	MF	(Russia) RUS	Oleg Dineyev	1	0	0+1	0	0	0	0	0	0	0
Players who appeared for Spartak Moscow but left during the season:
9	MF	(Russia) RUS	Yegor Titov	9	0	6+3	0	0	0	0	0	0	0
10	FW	(Russia) RUS	Roman Pavlyuchenko	15	6	12+2	6	0	0	1	0	0	0
25	MF	(Ukraine) UKR	Maksym Kalynychenko	2	1	2	1	0	0	0	0	0	0

=== Goal scorers ===
Place	Position	Nation	Number	Name	Premier League	2008-09 Russian Cup	UEFA Champions League	UEFA Cup	Total
1	FW	(Russia)	32	Nikita Bazhenov	6	0	1	1	8
2	FW	(Brazil)	11	Welliton	6	0	0	0	6
2	FW	(Russia)	10	Roman Pavlyuchenko	6	0	0	0	6
2	MF	(Russia)	8	Aleksandr Pavlenko	6	0	0	0	6
2	FW	(Russia)	40	Artem Dzyuba	1	2	1	2	6
6	DF	(Germany)	4	Malik Fathi	3	0	0	1	4
7	MF	(Argentina)	19	Cristian Maidana	3	0	0	0	3
7	FW	(Russia)	18	Aleksandr Prudnikov	2	1	0	0	3
9	MF	(Brazil)	5	Mozart	2	0	0	0	2
9	DF	(Czech Republic)	15	Radoslav Kováč	2	0	0	0	2
9	MF	(Russia)	90	Vladislav Ryzhkov	1	1	0	0	2
9	DF	(Argentina)	14	Clemente Rodríguez	1	0	0	1	2
13	DF	(Lithuania)	70	Ignas Dedura	1	0	0	0	1
13	MF	(Russia)	23	Vladimir Bystrov	1	0	0	0	1
13	MF	(Ukraine)	25	Maksym Kalynychenko	1	0	0	0	1
13	MF	(Russia)	30	Ivan Saenko	0	0	0	1	1
13	MF	(Moldova)	27	Serghei Covalciuc	0	0	0	1	1
13				Own goal	1	0	0	0	1
TOTALS					43	4	2	7	56

=== Clean sheets ===
Place	Position	Nation	Number	Name	Premier League	2008-09 Russian Cup	UEFA Champions League	UEFA Cup	Total
1	GK	(Croatia)	22	Stipe Pletikosa	8	0	0	2	10
TOTALS					8	0	0	2	10

=== Disciplinary record ===
Number	Nation	Position	Name	Premier League		2008-09 Russian Cup		UEFA Champions League		UEFA Cup		Total	
Number	Nation	Position	Name	Booked	Sent off (straight red)	Booked	Sent off (straight red)	Booked	Sent off (straight red)	Booked	Sent off (straight red)	Booked	Sent off (straight red)
3	(Austria)	DF	Martin Stranzl	3	0	0	0	0	0	0	0	3	0
4	(Germany)	DF	Malik Fathi	7	1	0	0	0	0	0	0	7	1
5	(Brazil)	MF	Mozart	9	2	0	0	0	0	0	0	9	2
7	(Czech Republic)	DF	Martin Jiránek	3	0	0	0	0	0	1	0	4	0
8	(Russia)	MF	Aleksandr Pavlenko	2	0	0	0	1	0	0	0	3	0
11	(Brazil)	FW	Welliton	4	0	0	0	0	0	0	0	4	0
14	(Argentina)	DF	Clemente Rodríguez	1	0	0	0	0	0	0	0	1	0
15	(Czech Republic)	DF	Radoslav Kováč	8	0	0	0	1	0	3	0	12	0
18	(Russia)	FW	Aleksandr Prudnikov	4	0	1	0	0	0	0	0	5	0
19	(Argentina)	MF	Cristian Maidana	2	0	1	0	0	0	0	0	3	0
22	(Croatia)	GK	Stipe Pletikosa	2	0	0	0	0	0	1	0	3	0
23	(Russia)	MF	Vladimir Bystrov	3	1	0	0	0	0	1	0	4	1
27	(Moldova)	MF	Serghei Covalciuc	3	0	0	0	0	0	0	0	3	0
30	(Russia)	MF	Ivan Saenko	5	0	0	0	0	0	1	0	6	0
31	(Russia)	MF	Sergei Parshivlyuk	3	0	0	0	0	0	1	0	4	0
32	(Russia)	FW	Nikita Bazhenov	4	0	0	0	0	0	0	0	4	0
35	(Russia)	GK	Soslan Dzhanayev	1	0	1	0	0	0	0	0	2	0
37	(Ukraine)	MF	Yehor Luhachov	0	0	1	0	0	0	0	0	1	0
43	(Russia)	MF	Aleksandr Zotov	0	0	0	0	0	0	1	0	1	0
49	(Russia)	DF	Roman Shishkin	1	0	2	1	0	0	0	0	3	1
59	(Russia)	DF	Andrei Ivanov	0	0	0	0	0	0	1	0	1	0
70	(Lithuania)	DF	Ignas Dedura	2	0	0	0	0	0	0	0	2	0
88	(Belarus)	DF	Egor Filipenko	3	0	0	0	0	0	0	0	3	0
96	(Russia)	MF	Konstantin Sovetkin	1	0	0	0	0	0	0	0	1	0
Players away on loan:
34	(Russia)	DF	Renat Sabitov	1	0	0	0	0	0	0	0	1	0
Players who left Spartak Moscow season during the season:
10	(Russia)	FW	Roman Pavlyuchenko	4	1	0	0	0	0	0	0	4	1
Total				76	5	6	1	2	0	10	0	94	6
