= 2009 FC Spartak Moscow season =

Spartak Moscow
2009 season
- Manager: Michael Laudrup (until 15 April); Valeri Karpin (from 15 April)
- Stadium: Luzhniki Stadium
- Premier League: 2nd
- 2008–09 Russian Cup: Quarterfinal vs Dynamo Moscow
- 2009–10 Russian Cup: Round of 16 vs FC Moscow
- Top goalscorer: League: Welliton (21); All: Welliton (21)

The 2009 FC Spartak Moscow season was the club's 18th season in the Russian Premier League season. Spartak finished the season in 2nd place, reaching the quarterfinals of the 2008–09 Russian Cup, where they were knocked out by Dynamo Moscow, and the Last 16 of the 2009–10 Russian Cup where FC Moscow knocked them out.

== Season events ==
On 15 April, Michael Laudrup was sacked as manager, with Valeri Karpin being appointed as his replacement.

== Squad ==
As of match played 29 November 2009

No.	Name	Nationality	Position	Date of birth (age)	Signed from	Signed in	Contract ends	Apps.	Goals
Goalkeepers
1	Soslan Dzhanayev	(Russia)	GK	13 March 1987 (aged 22)	KAMAZ	2008		29	0
22	Stipe Pletikosa	(Croatia)	GK	8 January 1979 (aged 30)	Shakhtar Donetsk	2007		79	0
36	Azamat Jioyev	(Russia)	GK	6 January 1991 (aged 18)	Youth Team	2008		0	0
41	Ivan Komissarov	(Russia)	GK	28 May 1988 (aged 21)	Youth Team	2005		0	0
60	Sergei Pesyakov	(Russia)	GK	28 May 1988 (aged 21)	Shinnik Yaroslavl	2009		0	0
Defenders
3	Martin Stranzl	(Austria)	DF	16 June 1980 (aged 29)	VfB Stuttgart	2006		65	3
4	Malik Fathi	(Germany)	DF	29 October 1983 (aged 26)	Hertha BSC	2008	2011	46	7
6	Renat Sabitov	(Russia)	DF	13 June 1985 (aged 24)	Saturn Ramenskoye	2007		41	0
13	Fyodor Kudryashov	(Russia)	DF	5 April 1987 (aged 22)	Sibiryak Bratsk	2005		19	0
16	Yevgeni Makeyev	(Russia)	DF	24 July 1989 (aged 20)	Youth Team	2008		22	3
20	Ignas Dedura	(Lithuania)	DF	6 January 1978 (aged 31)	Skonto	2004		50	4
25	Martin Jiránek	(Czech Republic)	DF	25 May 1979 (aged 30)	Reggina	2004		154	3
43	Irakli Chezhiya	(Georgia (country))	DF	22 May 1992 (aged 17)	Youth Team	2008		0	0
45	Konstantin Kadeyev	(Russia)	DF	17 January 1989 (aged 20)	Youth Team	2008		0	0
56	Marat Hiyasov	(Russia)	DF	26 April 1992 (aged 17)	Youth Team	2009		0	0
58	Egor Filipenko	(Belarus)	DF	10 April 1988 (aged 21)	BATE Borisov	2008		22	1
Midfielders
2	Cristian Maidana	(Argentina)	MF	24 January 1987 (aged 22)	Banfield	2008		32	3
5	Rafael Carioca	(Brazil)	MF	18 June 1989 (aged 20)	Grêmio	2009	2013	25	0
7	Denis Boyarintsev	(Russia)	MF	6 February 1978 (aged 31)	Shinnik Yaroslavl	2009		113	14
10	Ivan Saenko	(Russia)	MF	17 October 1983 (aged 26)	1. FC Nürnberg	2008		29	2
12	Alex	(Brazil)	MF	25 March 1982 (aged 27)	Internacional	2009	2013	31	12
15	Sergei Parshivlyuk	(Russia)	MF	18 March 1989 (aged 20)	Youth Team	2007		51	1
17	Serghei Covalciuc	(Moldova)	MF	20 January 1982 (aged 27)	Karpaty Lviv	2004		97	3
18	Ibson	(Brazil)	MF	7 November 1983 (aged 26)	Porto	2009	2012	5	0
24	Vladislav Ryzhkov	(Russia)	MF	28 February 1990 (aged 19)	Youth Team	2008		15	2
26	Anton Khodyrev	(Russia)	MF	26 January 1992 (aged 17)	Youth Team	2009		0	0
27	Aleksandr Zotov	(Russia)	MF	27 August 1990 (aged 19)	Youth Team	2008		4	0
28	Dmitri Malyaka	(Russia)	MF	15 January 1990 (aged 19)	Youth Team	2008		0	0
30	Maksim Grigoryev	(Russia)	MF	6 July 1990 (aged 19)	Youth Team	2008		6	0
32	Artemi Maleyev	(Russia)	MF	4 May 1991 (aged 18)	Youth Team	2009		0	0
35	Aleksandr Kozhevnikov	(Russia)	MF	18 April 1990 (aged 19)	Youth Team	2008		0	0
37	Yehor Luhachov	(Ukraine)	MF	24 December 1988 (aged 20)	Lokomotyv Kyiv	2006		2	0
38	Igor Kireyev	(Russia)	MF	17 February 1992 (aged 17)	Youth Team	2008		0	0
39	Igor Gorbatenko	(Russia)	MF	13 February 1989 (aged 20)	Krylia Sovetov-SOK Dimitrovgrad	2008		2	0
48	Filip Ozobić	(Croatia)	MF	8 April 1991 (aged 18)	Youth Team	2009		0	0
49	Jano Ananidze	(Georgia (country))	MF	10 October 1992 (aged 17)	Youth Team	2009		10	3
51	Dmitri Kayumov	(Russia)	MF	11 May 1992 (aged 17)	Youth Team	2009		0	0
52	Oleg Dineyev	(Russia)	MF	30 October 1987 (aged 22)	Youth Team	2007		4	0
54	Dmitri Tumenko	(Russia)	MF	4 May 1989 (aged 20)	Youth Team	2008		0	0
Forwards
11	Welliton	(Brazil)	FW	22 October 1986 (aged 23)	Goiás	2007		54	31
21	Nikita Bazhenov	(Russia)	FW	1 February 1985 (aged 24)	Saturn Ramenskoye	2004		117	21
34	Aleksandr Kozlov	(Russia)	FW	19 March 1993 (aged 16)	Youth team	2009		0	0
40	Vladimir Obukhov	(Uzbekistan)	FW	8 February 1992 (aged 17)	Youth Team	2008		0	0
44	Pavel Yakovlev	(Russia)	FW	7 April 1991 (aged 18)	Youth Team	2008		17	4
46	Dmitri Khlebosolov	(Belarus)	FW	7 October 1990 (aged 19)	Baranovichi	2009		0	0
50	Artyom Fomin	(Russia)	FW	8 July 1988 (aged 21)	Youth Team	2006		0	0
55	Quincy Owusu-Abeyie	(Netherlands)	FW	15 April 1986 (aged 23)	Arsenal	2006		39	3
57	Artyom Nozdrunov	(Russia)	FW	1 June 1992 (aged 17)	Youth team	2009		0	0
81	Eldar Nizamutdinov	(Russia)	FW	31 May 1981 (aged 28)	loan from Khimki	2009	2009	5	1
Away on loan
8	Aleksandr Pavlenko	(Russia)	MF	20 January 1985 (aged 24)	Lausanne-Sport	2001		149	16
9	Artem Dzyuba	(Russia)	FW	22 August 1988 (aged 21)	Youth Team	2006		58	10
19	Artur Maloyan	(Russia)	MF	4 February 1989 (aged 20)	Youth Team	2007		9	1
29	Amir Bazhev	(Russia)	MF	15 October 1988 (aged 21)	Youth Team	2006		1	0
31	Konstantin Sovetkin	(Russia)	MF	19 February 1989 (aged 20)	Youth Team	2008		6	0
33	Ilya Gultyayev	(Russia)	DF	5 September 1988 (aged 21)	Youth Team	2006		1	0
59	Andrei Ivanov	(Russia)	DF	8 October 1988 (aged 21)	Youth Team	2006		24	0
	Roman Shishkin	(Russia)	DF	27 January 1987 (aged 22)	Youth Team	2004		86	1
	Aleksandr Prudnikov	(Russia)	FW	26 February 1989 (aged 20)	Youth Team	2007		42	6
Players that left Spartak Moscow during the season
14	Clemente Rodríguez	(Argentina)	DF	31 July 1981 (aged 28)	Boca Juniors	2004		92	5
15	Radoslav Kováč	(Czech Republic)	DF	27 November 1979 (aged 30)	Sparta Prague	2005		133	13
16	Yevgeniy Gubin	(Russia)	GK	25 January 1989 (aged 20)	Youth Team	2005		0	0
23	Vladimir Bystrov	(Russia)	MF	31 January 1984 (aged 25)	Zenit St.Petersburg	2005		133	18
47	Maxim Potapov	(Russia)	DF	21 May 1991 (aged 18)	Youth Team	2009		0	0

=== On loan ===
Note: Flags indicate national team as defined under FIFA eligibility rules; some limited exceptions apply. Players may hold more than one non-FIFA nationality.

No.	Pos.	Nation	Player
8	MF	RUS	Aleksandr Pavlenko (at Rostov)
9	FW	RUS	Artem Dzyuba (at Tom Tomsk)
19	MF	RUS	Artur Maloyan (at Anzhi Makhachkala)
29	MF	RUS	Amir Bazhev (at Salyut-Energiya)
31	MF	RUS	Konstantin Sovetkin (at Anzhi Makhachkala)

No.	Pos.	Nation	Player
33	FW	RUS	Ilya Gultyayev (at Tom Tomsk)
59	DF	RUS	Andrei Ivanov (at Tom Tomsk)
—	DF	RUS	Roman Shishkin (at Krylia Sovetov)
—	FW	RUS	Aleksandr Prudnikov (at Sparta Prague)

=== Left club during season ===
Note: Flags indicate national team as defined under FIFA eligibility rules; some limited exceptions apply. Players may hold more than one non-FIFA nationality.

No.	Pos.	Nation	Player
14	DF	ARG	Clemente Rodríguez (to Estudiantes)
15	DF	CZE	Radoslav Kováč (to West Ham United)
16	GK	RUS	Yevgeniy Gubin

No.	Pos.	Nation	Player
23	MF	RUS	Vladimir Bystrov (to Zenit St.Petersburg)
47	MF	RUS	Maxim Potapov

== Transfers ==
=== In ===
Date	Position	Nationality	Name	From	Fee	Ref.
15 December 2008	MF	(Brazil)	Rafael Carioca	Grêmio	Undisclosed	
25 December 2008	MF	(Russia)	Denis Boyarintsev	Shinnik Yaroslavl	Undisclosed	
27 February 2009	MF	(Brazil)	Alex	Internacional	Undisclosed	
Winter 2009	FW	(Belarus)	Dmitri Khlebosolov	Baranovichi	Undisclosed	
14 July 2009	GK	(Russia)	Sergei Pesyakov	Shinnik Yaroslavl	Undisclosed	
14 July 2009	MF	(Brazil)	Ibson	Porto	Undisclosed	

=== Loans in ===
Date	Position	Nationality	Name	From	Fee	Ref.
31 August 2009	MF	(Russia)	Eldar Nizamutdinov	Khimki	End of Season	

=== Out ===
Date	Position	Nationality	Name	To	Fee	Ref.
8 August 2009	MF	(Russia)	Vladimir Bystrov	Zenit St.Petersburg	Undisclosed	
14 August 2009	DF	(Czech Republic)	Radoslav Kováč	West Ham United	Undisclosed	

=== Loans out ===
Date from	Position	Nationality	Name	To	Date to	Ref.
Winter 2009	DF	(Russia)	Andrei Ivanov	Tom Tomsk	End of Seaaon	
Winter 2009	DF	(Russia)	Roman Shishkin	Krylia Sovetov	End of Seaaon	
Winter 2009	FW	(Russia)	Aleksandr Prudnikov	Terek Grozny	Summer 2009	
16 January 2009	MF	(Argentina)	Cristian Maidana	Recreativo de Huelva	Summer 2009	
30 January 2009	DF	(Czech Republic)	Radoslav Kováč	West Ham United	Summer 2009	
30 July 2009	MF	(Russia)	Amir Bazhev	Salyut-Energiya	End of Season	
7 August 2009	FW	(Russia)	Artem Dzyuba	Tom Tomsk	End of Season	
19 August 2009	MF	(Russia)	Artur Maloyan	Anzhi Makhachkala	End of Season	
19 August 2009	MF	(Russia)	Konstantin Sovetkin	Anzhi Makhachkala	End of Season	
27 August 2009	MF	(Russia)	Aleksandr Pavlenko	Rostov	End of Season	
1 September 2009	DF	(Russia)	Ilya Gultyayev	Tom Tomsk	End of Season	
Summer 2009	FW	(Russia)	Aleksandr Prudnikov	Sparta Prague	19 December 2009	

=== Released ===
Date	Position	Nationality	Name	Joined	Date
Summer 2009	GK	(Russia)	Yevgeniy Gubin		
Summer 2009	MF	(Russia)	Maxim Potapov		
10 August 2009	DF	(Argentina)	Clemente Rodríguez	Estudiantes	11 August 2009
31 December 2009	DF	(Lithuania)	Ignas Dedura	Salyut Belgorod	
31 December 2009	DF	(Russia)	Marat Hiyasov		
31 December 2009	MF	(Moldova)	Serghei Covalciuc	Tom Tomsk	
31 December 2009	MF	(Russia)	Amir Bazhev	Salyut Belgorod	
31 December 2009	MF	(Russia)	Denis Boyarintsev	Saturn Ramenskoye	
31 December 2009	FW	(Russia)	Artyom Fomin	Kairat	

== Competitions ==
=== Premier League ===
==== Results by round ====
Round	1	2	3	4	5	6	7	8	9	10	11	12	13	14	15	16	17	18	19	20	21	22	23	24	25	26	27	28	29	30
Ground	H	A	H	A	H	A	H	H	A	H	A	H	A	H	A	H	A	H	A	H	A	A	H	A	H	A	H	A	H	A
Result	D	L	W	L	W	W	L	W	D	W	L	W	W	D	W	W	W	W	W	L	D	L	W	W	W	W	W	L	L	L

Updated to match(es) played on 29 November 2009. Source: See Results
A = Away; H = Home; W = Win; D = Draw; L = Loss

==== Results ====
15 March 2009 1	Spartak Moscow	1 – 1	Zenit St.Petersburg	Moscow
14:00 MSK (UTC+3)	Saenko 2'; Bystrov (yellow card) 51'; Parshivlyuk (yellow card) 52'	Report	Pogrebnyak 17'; Tymoshchuk (yellow card) 31'; Denisov (yellow card) 53'; Fayzulin (yellow card) 74'	Stadium: Luzhniki Stadium; Attendance: 50,000; Referee: Stanislav Sukhina

21 March 2009 2	Kuban Krasnodar	1 – 0	Spartak Moscow	Krasnodar
14:00 MSK (UTC+3)	Kasaev (yellow card) 29'; Traoré 31' (penalty missed) 51'; Khagush (yellow card) 48'; Ushenin (yellow card) 69'; Tlisov (yellow card) 90+'	Report	Alex (penalty missed) 20'; Saenko (yellow card) 24'; Sabitov (yellow card) 43'; Welliton (yellow card) 63'; Fathi (yellow card) 64'; Grigoryev (yellow card) 71'	Stadium: Kuban Stadium; Attendance: 28,000; Referee: Vladislav Bezborodov

5 April 2009 3	Spartak Moscow	2 – 0	Spartak Nalchik	Moscow
19:00 MSK (DST) (UTC+4)	Alex 44'; Welliton 49'; Ryzhkov (yellow card) 74'	Report	Yatchenko (yellow card) 60'; Kontsedalov (yellow card) 67'	Stadium: Luzhniki Stadium; Attendance: 14,000; Referee: Ildus Biglov

11 April 2009 4	FC Moscow	3 – 1	Spartak Moscow	Moscow
14:00 MSK (DST) (UTC+4)	Česnauskis 2'; Epureanu 17'; Vukić (yellow card) 27'; Okoronkwo (yellow card) 31'; Tarasov (yellow card) 36' (goal) 69'; Stavpets (yellow card) 90+'	Report	Alex (yellow card) 24' (goal) 87' (pen.); Fathi (yellow card) 45'; Parshivlyuk (yellow card) 69'	Stadium: Eduard Streltsov Stadium; Attendance: 9,600; Referee: Vladimir Pettay

18 April 2009 5	Spartak Moscow	2 – 0	Terek Grozny	Moscow
17:30 MSK (DST) (UTC+4)	Bystrov (yellow card) 48' (goal) 73'; Makeyev (yellow card) 59'; Welliton 82'	Report	Mishchenko (red card) 57'; Amelyanchuk (yellow card) 74'; Smirnov (yellow card) 81'	Stadium: Lokomotiv Stadium; Attendance: 10,300; Referee: Nikolai Ivanov

25 April 2009 6	Rubin Kazan	0 – 2	Spartak Moscow	Kazan
14:00 MSK (DST) (UTC+4)	Domínguez (yellow card) 39'; Sibaya (yellow card) 43'; Navas (yellow card) 46'	Report	Alex (yellow card) 40'; Stranzl 50'; Welliton (yellow card) 53' (goal) 62'; Covalciuc (yellow card) 55'; Boyarintsev (yellow card) 68'; Fathi (yellow card) 70'; Pavlenko (yellow card) 90+'	Stadium: Central Stadium; Attendance: 25,000; Referee: Vladislav Bezborodov

2 May 2009 7	Spartak Moscow	0 – 2	Dynamo Moscow	Moscow
14:00 MSK (DST) (UTC+4)	Makeyev (yellow card) 22'; Pavlenko (yellow card) 52'	Report	Fernández 28'; Kokorin 90'	Stadium: Luzhniki Stadium; Attendance: 30,000; Referee: Yuri Baskakov

11 May 2009 8	Spartak Moscow	4 – 0	Saturn Ramenskoye	Moscow
16:30 MSK (DST) (UTC+4)	Makeyev 7'; Dzyuba 21'; Welliton 26', 72'; Boyarintsev (yellow card) 48'	Report	Karyaka (yellow card) 38'; Halilović (yellow card) 60'	Stadium: Luzhniki Stadium; Attendance: 11,000; Referee: Vladimir Pettay

17 May 2009 9	Tom Tomsk	1 – 1	Spartak Moscow	Tomsk
12:30 MSK (DST) (UTC+4)	Kharitonov (yellow card) 7' (goal) 26'; Michkov (yellow card) 49'	Report	Bystrov (yellow card) 17'; Dzyuba 32'; Boyarintsev (yellow card) 88'	Stadium: Trud Stadium; Attendance: 14,000; Referee: Nikolai Ivanov

23 May 2009 10	Spartak Moscow	5 – 1	Amkar Perm	Moscow
16:30 MSK (DST) (UTC+4)	Welliton 10', 88' (yellow card) 18'; Alex 51', 86'; Bazhenov 80'	Report	Kushev (yellow card) 23'; Grishin (yellow card) 32'; Starkov 90'	Stadium: Luzhniki Stadium; Attendance: 10,000; Referee: Vladimir Kazmenko

29 May 2009 11	Lokomotiv Moscow	2 – 1	Spartak Moscow	Moscow
MSK (DST) (UTC+4)	Gatagov (yellow card) 20'; Rodolfo 23'; Sychev (yellow card) 25' (yellow-red card) 51'; Minchenkov 37'; Fininho (yellow card) 46' (yellow-red card) 90+'; Glushakov (yellow card) 80'	Report	Alex 44'; Bystrov (yellow card) 54'; Welliton (yellow card) 65'; Carioca (yellow card) 74' (yellow-red card) 80'; Jiránek (yellow card) 79'	Stadium: Lokomotiv Stadium; Attendance: 28,100; Referee: Aleksei Nikolaev

13 June 2009 12	Spartak Moscow	1 – 0	Khimki	Moscow
16:30 MSK (DST) (UTC+4)	Fathi 29' (yellow card) 30'; Maloyan (yellow card) 63'; Pavlenko (yellow card) 70'	Report	Ibragimov (yellow card) 37'; Zinovyev (yellow card) 53'	Stadium: Luzhniki Stadium; Attendance: 10,500; Referee: Eduard Malyi

11 July 2009 13	Rostov	0 – 1	Spartak Moscow	Rostov-on-Don
21:00 MSK (DST) (UTC+4)	Gațcan (yellow card) 22'; Lebedenko (yellow card) 67'; Petrović (yellow card) 76'	Report	Sabitov (yellow card) 45+'; Welliton 71'	Stadium: Olimp-2; Attendance: 15,800; Referee: Alexei Kovalev

19 July 2009 14	Spartak Moscow	1 – 1	Krylia Sovetov	Moscow
16:00 MSK (DST) (UTC+4)	Bystrov (yellow card) 51' (goal) 87'; Alex (yellow card) 53'; Stranzl (yellow card) 74'; Dzhanayev (yellow card) 86'	Report	Kalachev 27'; Ajinjal (yellow card) 48'; Shishkin (yellow card) 90+'	Stadium: Luzhniki Stadium; Attendance: 17,000; Referee: Vladislav Bezborodov

26 July 2009 15	CSKA Moscow	1 – 2	Spartak Moscow	Moscow
16:00 MSK (DST) (UTC+4)	Šemberas 13' (yellow card) 25'; Akinfeev (yellow card) 90'	Report	Alex 24', 65' (pen.); Makeyev (yellow card) 33'; Covalciuc (yellow card) 40' (yellow-red card) 67'; Welliton (yellow card) 90'	Stadium: Luzhniki Stadium; Attendance: 58,000; Referee: Aleksandr Kolobaev

1 August 2009 16	Spartak Moscow	4 – 0	Kuban Krasnodar	Moscow
16:00 MSK (DST) (UTC+4)	Tlisov 21' (o.g.); Parshivlyuk (yellow card) 41'; Welliton 53', 60'; Alex (yellow card) 60'; Makeyev (yellow card) 75'; Bystrov 88'	Report	Traoré (yellow card) 11'; Kasaev (yellow card) 20'	Stadium: Luzhniki Stadium; Attendance: 12,000; Referee: Ildus Biglov

8 August 2009 17	Spartak Nalchik	2 – 4	Spartak Moscow	Nalchik
18:45 MSK (DST) (UTC+4)	Leandro (penalty missed) 17'; Kisenkov 45+'; Asildarov 56'; Bikmaev (yellow card) 65'; Amisulashvili (yellow card) 77'	Report	Sabitov (yellow card) 3'; Welliton 6', 11', 90' (pen.); Bystrov 75'; Covalciuc (yellow card) 84'; Dzhanayev (yellow card) 86'	Stadium: Spartak Stadium; Attendance: 12,000; Referee: Nikolai Ivanov

16 August 2009 18	Spartak Moscow	2 – 1	FC Moscow	Moscow
21:00 MSK (DST) (UTC+4)	Welliton (yellow card) 31'; Bystrov (yellow card) 31'; Yakovlev 45+'; Makeyev 88'	Report	Sheshukov (yellow card) 31'; Tarasov (yellow card) 31'; Samedov (yellow card) 31'; Vukić 50'	Stadium: Luzhniki Stadium; Attendance: 17,000; Referee: Aleksei Nikolaev

23 August 2009 19	Terek Grozny	2 – 3	Spartak Moscow	Grozny
21:00 MSK (DST) (UTC+4)	Zabavník (yellow card) 39'; Gogua (yellow card) 44'; Kutarba 62'; Dzhabrailov (yellow card) 65'; Lakhiyalov 90+2'	Report	Sabitov (yellow card) 15'; Yakovlev (yellow card) 17' (goal) 25'; Welliton 29', 33'; Makeyev (yellow card) 86'	Stadium: Sultan Bilimkhanov Stadium; Attendance: 3,500; Referee: Alexei Kovalev

30 August 2009 20	Spartak Moscow	0 – 3	Rubin Kazan	Moscow
16:00 MSK (DST) (UTC+4)	Makeyev (yellow card) 16'; Dedura (yellow card) 50'; Parshivlyuk (yellow card) 71'	Report	Semak 33'; Domínguez 39' (pen.); Ryazantsev (yellow card) 54'; Bukharov 58'; Navas (yellow card) 70'; Balyaikin (yellow card) 90+'	Stadium: Luzhniki Stadium; Attendance: 48,000; Referee: Stanislav Sukhina

13 September 2009 21	Dynamo Moscow	1 – 1	Spartak Moscow	Khimki
14:00 MSK (DST) (UTC+4)	Ropotan 8' (yellow card) 82'; Tanasijević (yellow card) 15'; Fernández (yellow card) 81'; Kowalczyk (yellow card) 84'; Kerzhakov (yellow card) 90'	Report	Filipenko (yellow card) 23'; Welliton (yellow card) 26'; Jiránek (yellow card) 38'; Bazhenov 74'	Stadium: Arena Khimki; Attendance: 15,758; Referee: Vladimir Pettay

19 September 2009 22	Saturn Ramenskoye	2 – 1	Spartak Moscow	Ramenskoye
14:00 MSK (DST) (UTC+4)	Loskov 30' (yellow card) 37'; Nakhushev (yellow card) 33'; Topić 53'	Report	Bazhenov (yellow card) 42'; Alex 52' (pen.); Covalciuc (yellow card) 77'; Jiránek (yellow card) 84'; Welliton (yellow card) 86'	Stadium: Saturn Stadium; Attendance: 13,500; Referee: Vyacheslav Popov

27 September 2009 23	Spartak Moscow	5 – 0	Tom Tomsk	Moscow
18:30 MSK (DST) (UTC+4)	Jiránek (yellow card) 9' (goal) 15'; Yakovlev 25' (yellow card) 55'; Filipenko 39'; Sabitov (yellow card) 43'; Carioca (yellow card) 56'; Nizamutdinov 66'; Owusu-Abeyie 84'	Report	D.N.Smirnov (yellow card) 30'; Yanotovsky (yellow card) 37'	Stadium: Luzhniki Stadium; Attendance: 11,000; Referee: Alexei Kovalev

4 October 2009 24	Amkar Perm	1 – 2	Spartak Moscow	Perm
12:00 MSK (DST) (UTC+4)	Kushev 24'; Fedoriv (yellow card) 64'	Report	Nizamutdinov (yellow card) 52'; Owusu-Abeyie (yellow card) 54'; Welliton 55'; Fathi 71'; Yakovlev (yellow card) 80'; Covalciuc (yellow card) 82'	Stadium: Zvezda Stadium; Attendance: 17,800; Referee: Eduard Malyi

18 October 2009 25	Spartak Moscow	3 – 0	Lokomotiv Moscow	Moscow
14:00 MSK (DST) (UTC+4)	Ananidze 40'; Welliton 63'; Sabitov (yellow card) 64'; Owusu-Abeyie 84'	Report	Odemwingie (yellow card) 20'; Asatiani (yellow card) 41'	Stadium: Luzhniki Stadium; Attendance: 37,000; Referee: Yuri Baskakov

24 October 2009 26	Khimki	0 – 3	Spartak Moscow	Khimki
16:15 MSK (DST) (UTC+4)	Starkov (yellow card) 6'; Rotenberg (yellow card) 47'; Semochko (yellow card) 57'	Report	Carioca (yellow card) 2'; Welliton 10', 88'; Parshivlyuk 44'	Stadium: Arena Khimki; Attendance: 7,300; Referee: Aleksandr Kolobaev

1 November 2009 27	Spartak Moscow	5 – 1	Rostov	Moscow
14:00 MSK (UTC+3)	Alex 19', 59'; Carioca (yellow card) 28'; Yakovlev 39'; Ananidze 76'; Welliton 82'	Report	Lengyel (yellow card) 19'; Sheriyev (yellow card) 36'; Gațcan 51' (yellow card) 83'	Stadium: Luzhniki Stadium; Attendance: 15,000; Referee: Eduard Malyi

7 November 2009 28	Krylia Sovetov	2 – 1	Spartak Moscow	Samara
17:00 MSK (UTC+3)	Stranzl 11' (o.g.); Bobyor 14'; Leilton (yellow card) 70'; Ivanov (yellow card) 89'	Report	Jiránek (yellow card) 10'; Parshivlyuk (yellow card) 13'; Welliton (yellow card) 29'; Kudryashov (yellow card) 61'; Alex 90+'	Stadium: Metallurg Stadium; Referee: Aleksandr Gvardis

21 November 2009 29	Spartak Moscow	2 – 3	CSKA Moscow	Moscow
14:00 MSK (UTC+3)	Alex 6' (pen.) (yellow card) 90'; Stranzl (yellow card) 38'; Welliton 65'; Covalciuc (yellow card) 85'	Report	Akinfeev (yellow card) 6'; A.Berezutski (yellow card) 39'; Dzagoev 45'; Necid 49', 88' (yellow card) 90'	Stadium: Lokomotiv Stadium; Attendance: 60,000; Referee: Yuri Baskakov

29 November 2009 30	Zenit St.Petersburg	2 – 1	Spartak Moscow	Saint Petersburg
14:00 MSK (UTC+3)	Huszti (yellow card) 5' (yellow-red card) 44'; Bystrov (yellow card) 24'; Anyukov (yellow card) 45'; Zyryanov 45+'; Lombaerts 50'	Report	Boyarintsev (yellow card) 43'; Makeyev (yellow card) 70'; Fathi 83' (yellow card) 85'; Alex (yellow card) 90'	Stadium: Petrovsky Stadium; Attendance: 22,500; Referee: Stanislav Sukhina

==== League table ====
Pos	Team	Pld	W	D	L	GF	GA	GD	Pts	Qualification or relegation
1	Rubin Kazan (C)	30	19	6	5	62	21	+41	63	Qualification to Champions League group stage
2	Spartak Moscow	30	17	4	9	61	33	+28	55	Qualification to Champions League group stage
3	Zenit St. Petersburg	30	15	9	6	48	27	+21	54	Qualification to Champions League third qualifying round (Note: Winners of 2009–10 Russian Cup, Zenit, qualified for the Champions League, that means the loser finalists Sibir Novosibirsk will play in third qualifying round of the UEFA Europa League.)
4	Lokomotiv Moscow	30	15	9	6	43	30	+13	54	Qualification to Europa League play-off round
5	CSKA Moscow	30	16	4	10	48	30	+18	52	Qualification to Europa League play-off round

Source: RFPL (in Russian)
Rules for classification: 1st points; 2nd matches won; 3rd head-to-head (points, matches won, goal difference, goals scored, away goals scored); 4th goal difference; 5th goals scored; 6th away goals scored; 7th position in previous season or decision game
(C) Champions

=== Russian Cup ===
==== 2008-09 ====
15 April 2009 Quarterfinal	Spartak Moscow	0 – 3	Dynamo Moscow	Moscow
20:00 MSK (DST) (UTC+4)	Sabitov (yellow card) 22'; Covalciuc (yellow card) 23'	Report	K.Kombarov (yellow card) 19'; Denisov (yellow card) 26'; Dimidko (yellow card) 59'; Kerzhakov 63'; Khokhlov 77'; Smolov 89'	Stadium: Luzhniki Stadium; Attendance: 23,000; Referee: Aleksandr Kolobaev

==== 2009-10 ====
15 July 2009 Last 32	Krasnodar	1 – 2	Spartak Moscow	Krasnodar
20:00 MSK (DST) (UTC+4)	Tsukanov (yellow card) 59' (goal) 90+3'; Oleinik (yellow card) 63'; Miroshnichenko (yellow card) 81'	Report	Ryzhkov (yellow card) 49'; Maloyan (yellow card) 64' (goal) 74'; Pavlenko (yellow card) 81'; Boyarintsev (yellow card) 85'; Ananidze 90'	Stadium: Kuban Stadium; Attendance: 16,000; Referee: Ildus Biglov

5 August 2009 Round of 16	Spartak Moscow	1 – 2	FC Moscow	Moscow
19:00 MSK (DST) (UTC+4)	Makeyev 9'; Covalciuc (red card) 42'; Alex (yellow card) 84'	Report	Tarasov (yellow card) 14'; Česnauskis (yellow card) 22' (goal) 27'; Strelkov 75'	Stadium: Luzhniki Stadium; Attendance: 14,000; Referee: Maksim Layushkin

== Squad statistics ==
As of match played 29 November 2009

=== Appearances and goals ===
No.	Pos	Nat	Player	Total		Premier League		2008-09 Russian Cup		2009-10 Russian Cup	
No.	Pos	Nat	Player	Apps	Goals	Apps	Goals	Apps	Goals	Apps	Goals
1	GK	(Russia) RUS	Soslan Dzhanayev	27	0	26	0	0	0	1	0
2	MF	(Argentina) ARG	Cristian Maidana	1	0	0	0	0	0	1	0
3	DF	(Austria) AUT	Martin Stranzl	19	1	19	1	0	0	0	0
4	DF	(Germany) GER	Malik Fathi	19	3	13+3	3	1	0	2	0
5	MF	(Brazil) BRA	Rafael Carioca	25	0	22+1	0	0	0	2	0
6	DF	(Russia) RUS	Renat Sabitov	20	0	12+6	0	1	0	0+1	0
7	MF	(Russia) RUS	Denis Boyarintsev	20	0	11+8	0	0	0	1	0
10	MF	(Russia) RUS	Ivan Saenko	14	1	12+1	1	0+1	0	0	0
11	FW	(Brazil) BRA	Welliton	30	21	28	21	1	0	1	0
12	MF	(Brazil) BRA	Alex	31	12	29	12	1	0	1	0
13	DF	(Russia) RUS	Fyodor Kudryashov	7	0	7	0	0	0	0	0
15	MF	(Russia) RUS	Sergei Parshivlyuk	22	1	21	1	0	0	1	0
16	DF	(Russia) RUS	Yevgeni Makeyev	22	3	17+3	2	1	0	1	1
17	MF	(Moldova) MDA	Serghei Covalciuc	18	0	12+4	0	1	0	1	0
18	MF	(Brazil) BRA	Ibson	5	0	3+2	0	0	0	0	0
20	DF	(Lithuania) LTU	Ignas Dedura	5	0	2+2	0	0	0	1	0
21	FW	(Russia) RUS	Nikita Bazhenov	23	2	10+12	2	1	0	0	0
22	GK	(Croatia) CRO	Stipe Pletikosa	6	0	4	0	1	0	1	0
24	MF	(Russia) RUS	Vladislav Ryzhkov	7	0	2+2	0	0+1	0	1+1	0
25	DF	(Czech Republic) CZE	Martin Jiránek	31	1	29	1	1	0	1	0
30	MF	(Russia) RUS	Maksim Grigoryev	4	0	1+2	0	0	0	1	0
39	MF	(Russia) RUS	Igor Gorbatenko	2	0	0+2	0	0	0	0	0
44	FW	(Russia) RUS	Pavel Yakovlev	17	4	11+4	4	0	0	0+2	0
49	MF	(Georgia (country)) GEO	Jano Ananidze	10	3	5+4	2	0	0	1	1
55	FW	(Netherlands) NED	Quincy Owusu-Abeyie	7	2	1+6	2	0	0	0	0
58	DF	(Belarus) BLR	Egor Filipenko	5	1	4+1	1	0	0	0	0
81	FW	(Russia) RUS	Eldar Nizamutdinov	5	1	2+3	1	0	0	0	0
Players away from the club on loan:
8	MF	(Russia) RUS	Aleksandr Pavlenko	11	0	1+9	0	0	0	1	0
9	FW	(Russia) RUS	Artem Dzyuba	9	2	6+2	2	0+1	0	0	0
19	MF	(Russia) RUS	Artur Maloyan	4	1	1+2	0	0	0	1	1
33	DF	(Russia) RUS	Ilya Gultyayev	1	0	0	0	0	0	0+1	0
Players who appeared for Spartak Moscow but left during the season:
14	DF	(Argentina) ARG	Clemente Rodríguez	9	0	3+4	0	1	0	1	0
23	MF	(Russia) RUS	Vladimir Bystrov	20	4	16+2	4	1	0	1	0

=== Goal scorers ===
Place	Position	Nation	Number	Name	Premier League	2008-09 Russian Cup	2009-10 Russian Cup	Total
1	FW	(Brazil)	11	Welliton	21	0	0	21
2	MF	(Brazil)	12	Alex	12	0	0	12
3	MF	(Russia)	23	Vladimir Bystrov	4	0	0	4
3	FW	(Russia)	44	Pavel Yakovlev	4	0	0	4
5	DF	(Germany)	4	Malik Fathi	3	0	0	3
5	DF	(Russia)	16	Yevgeni Makeyev	2	0	1	3
5	MF	(Georgia (country))	49	Jano Ananidze	2	0	1	3
8	FW	(Russia)	9	Artem Dzyuba	2	0	0	2
8	FW	(Russia)	21	Nikita Bazhenov	2	0	0	2
8	DF	(Netherlands)	55	Quincy Owusu-Abeyie	2	0	0	2
11	MF	(Russia)	10	Ivan Saenko	1	0	0	1
11	DF	(Austria)	3	Martin Stranzl	1	0	0	1
11	DF	(Czech Republic)	25	Martin Jiránek	1	0	0	1
11	DF	(Belarus)	58	Egor Filipenko	1	0	0	1
11	FW	(Russia)	81	Eldar Nizamutdinov	1	0	0	1
11	MF	(Russia)	15	Sergei Parshivlyuk	1	0	0	1
11	MF	(Russia)	19	Artur Maloyan	0	0	1	1
11				Own goal	1	0	0	1
TOTALS					61	0	3	64

=== Clean sheets ===
Place	Position	Nation	Number	Name	Premier League	2008-09 Russian Cup	2009-10 Russian Cup	Total
1	GK	(Russia)	1	Soslan Dzhanayev	9	0	0	9
2	GK	(Croatia)	22	Stipe Pletikosa	1	0	0	1
TOTALS					10	0	0	10

=== Disciplinary record ===
Number	Nation	Position	Name	Premier League		2008-09 Russian Cup		2009-10 Russian Cup		Total	
Number	Nation	Position	Name	Booked	Sent off (straight red)	Booked	Sent off (straight red)	Booked	Sent off (straight red)	Booked	Sent off (straight red)
1	(Russia)	GK	Soslan Dzhanayev	2	0	0	0	0	0	2	0
3	(Austria)	DF	Martin Stranzl	2	0	0	0	0	0	2	0
4	(Germany)	DF	Malik Fathi	5	0	0	0	0	0	5	0
5	(Brazil)	MF	Rafael Carioca	5	1	0	0	0	0	5	1
6	(Russia)	DF	Renat Sabitov	6	0	1	0	0	0	7	0
7	(Russia)	MF	Denis Boyarintsev	4	0	1	0	0	0	5	0
10	(Russia)	MF	Ivan Saenko	1	0	0	0	0	0	1	0
11	(Brazil)	FW	Welliton	9	0	0	0	0	0	9	0
12	(Brazil)	MF	Alex	6	0	1	0	0	0	7	0
13	(Russia)	DF	Fyodor Kudryashov	1	0	0	0	0	0	1	0
15	(Russia)	MF	Sergei Parshivlyuk	5	0	0	0	0	0	5	0
16	(Russia)	DF	Yevgeni Makeyev	7	0	0	0	0	0	7	0
17	(Moldova)	MF	Serghei Covalciuc	7	1	1	0	0	1	8	2
20	(Lithuania)	DF	Ignas Dedura	1	0	0	0	0	0	1	0
21	(Russia)	FW	Nikita Bazhenov	1	0	0	0	0	0	1	0
24	(Russia)	MF	Vladislav Ryzhkov	1	0	1	0	0	0	2	0
25	(Czech Republic)	DF	Martin Jiránek	5	0	0	0	0	0	5	0
30	(Russia)	MF	Maksim Grigoryev	1	0	0	0	0	0	1	0
44	(Russia)	FW	Pavel Yakovlev	3	0	0	0	0	0	3	0
55	(Netherlands)	FW	Quincy Owusu-Abeyie	1	0	0	0	0	0	1	0
58	(Belarus)	DF	Egor Filipenko	1	0	0	0	0	0	1	0
81	(Russia)	FW	Eldar Nizamutdinov	1	0	0	0	0	0	1	0
Players away on loan:
8	(Russia)	MF	Aleksandr Pavlenko	3	0	1	0	0	0	4	0
19	(Russia)	MF	Artur Maloyan	1	0	1	0	0	0	2	0
Players who left Spartak Moscow season during the season:
23	(Russia)	MF	Vladimir Bystrov	6	0	0	0	0	0	6	0
Total				85	2	2	0	5	1	92	3
