= Yevgeni Andreyev =

Yevgeni Andreyev may refer to:

- Yevgeny Andreyev (colonel) (1926–2000), Air Force Colonel, parachute tester, Hero of the Soviet Union (1962).
- Yevgeni Andreyev (volleyball), Kazakhstani volleyball player who participated in the 2006 FIVB Men's World Championship
- Yevgeni Andreyev (footballer) (born 1988), Russian footballer
