= Nizamutdinov =

Nizamutdinov (Russian: Низамутдинов) is a masculine surname of Tatar origin, its feminine counterpart is Nizamutdinova. It is derived from the Arabic name Nizam-ud-deen (good order of the faith), meaning literally “of Nizamutdin”. Notable people with the surname include:

- Eldar Nizamutdinov (born 1981), Russian footballer
