= 2011 UEFA European Under-21 Championship qualification Group 8 =

Football tournament qualification stage

The teams competing in Group 7 of the 2011 UEFA European Under-21 Championships qualifying competition were Belgium, France, Malta, Slovenia and Ukraine.

== Standings ==
| Team | Pld | W | D | L | GF | GA | GD | Pts | (Ukraine) | (Belgium) | (France) | (Slovenia) | (Malta) |
|---|---|---|---|---|---|---|---|---|---|---|---|---|---|
| Ukraine | 8 | 4 | 4 | 0 | 13 | 5 | +8 | 16 | — | 1–1 | 2–2 | 0–0 | 1–0 |
| Belgium | 8 | 4 | 3 | 1 | 8 | 5 | +3 | 15 | 0–2 | — | 0–0 | 2–0 | 1–0 |
| France | 8 | 4 | 3 | 1 | 12 | 6 | +6 | 15 | 2–2 | 0–1 | — | 1–0 | 2–0 |
| Slovenia | 8 | 2 | 2 | 4 | 6 | 10 | −4 | 8 | 0–2 | 2–2 | 1–3 | — | 1–0 |
| Malta | 8 | 0 | 0 | 8 | 0 | 13 | −13 | 0 | 0–3 | 0–1 | 0–2 | 0–2 | — |

== Matches ==
31 March 2009
15:30 CET

| Malta | 0–2 | Slovenia |
|---|---|---|
| | Report | Mihelič 33', 65' (pen.) |

Hibernians Ground, Paola
Referee: Petur Reinert (Faroe Islands)

9 June 2009
17:00 CET

| Ukraine | 1–0 | Malta |
|---|---|---|
| Konoplianka 66' | Report |

Borex Stadium, Borodianka
Referee: Nikolay Yordanov (Bulgaria)

4 September 2009
18:00 CET

| Malta | 0–1 | Belgium |
|---|---|---|
| | Report | Kitoko 33' |

Ta' Qali National Stadium, Ta' Qali
Referee: Igor Satchi (Moldova)
5 September 2009
15:00 CET

| Slovenia | 1–3 | France |
|---|---|---|
| Marčeta 69' | Report | Modeste 18'; Bakar 43'; Škarabot 90+1' (o.g.) |

Ob Jezeru, Velenje
Referee: Michael Lerjeus (Sweden)

8 September 2009
20:00 CET

| Belgium | 2–0 | Slovenia |
|---|---|---|
| Nainggolan 56'; Lukaku 77' | Report |

Het Kuipje, Westerlo
Referee: Petteri Kari (Finland)
8 September 2009
20:45 CET

| France | 2–2 | Ukraine |
|---|---|---|
| Modeste 3'; Sakho 26' | Report | Chesnakov 44', 63' |

Stade Jean Laville, Gueugnon
Referee: Pavel Olsiak (Slovakia)

9 October 2009
19:00 CET

| Ukraine | 1–1 | Belgium |
|---|---|---|
| Zozulya 69' | Report | Mujangi Bia 67' |

Valeri Lobanovsky Stadium, Kyiv
Referee: Stephan Studer (Switzerland)
9 October 2009
20:50 CET

| Malta | 0–2 | France |
|---|---|---|
| | Report | Modeste 54'; Aït-Fana 77' |

Ta' Qali National Stadium, Ta' Qali
Referee: Huw Jones (Wales)

13 October 2009
20:50 CET

| Belgium | 0–0 | France |
|---|---|---|
| | Report |

Le Canonnier, Mouscron
Referee: Thorsten Kinhöfer (Germany)
14 October 2009
18:00 CET

| Slovenia | 0–2 | Ukraine |
|---|---|---|
| | Report | Morozyuk 34'; Lugachyov 44' |

Arena Petrol, Celje
Referee: Charlie Richmond (Scotland)

13 November 2009
16:00 CET

| Slovenia | 1–0 | Malta |
|---|---|---|
| Črnčič 48' | Report |

Športni Park, Nova Gorica
Referee: Anastassios Kakos (Greece)
13 November 2009
20:00 CET

| Belgium | 0–2 | Ukraine |
|---|---|---|
| | Report | Holodyuk 36', 73' |

Stayen, Sint-Truiden
Referee: Stuart Attwell (England)

17 November 2009
19:50 CET

| France | 1–0 | Slovenia |
|---|---|---|
| Sankharé 90+3' | Report |

Stade Auguste-Delaune II, Reims
Referee: Meir Levi (Israel)

3 March 2010
16:00 CET

| Belgium | 1–0 | Malta |
|---|---|---|
| Kums 74' (pen.) | Report |

Daknamstadion, Lokeren
Referee: Rene Eisner (Austria)

29 May 2010
18:00 CET

| Malta | 0–3 | Ukraine |
|---|---|---|
| | Report | Rakytsky 88' (pen.); Yarmolenko 89'; Fedorchuk 90+4' |

Ta' Qali National Stadium, Ta' Qali
Referee: Lars Christoffersen (Denmark)

11 August 2010
18:15 CET

| France | 0–1 | Belgium |
|---|---|---|
| | Report | Mokulu 8' |

Stade de la Rabine, Vannes
Referee: Luca Banti (Italy)

3 September 2010
16:00 CET

| Slovenia | 2–2 | Belgium |
|---|---|---|
| Mihelič 63' (pen.); Vučkić 81' | Report | Mununga 44'; Dequevy 60' |

Ob Jezeru, Velenje
Referee: Jan Valašek (Slovakia)
3 September 2010
18:00 CET

| Ukraine | 2–2 | France |
|---|---|---|
| Butko 54'; Rakytsky 58' (pen.) | Report | Bakar 62'; Rivière 74' |

Obolon Stadium, Kyiv
Referee: Milorad Mažić (Serbia)

7 September 2010
17:00 CET

| France | 2–0 | Malta |
|---|---|---|
| Kitambala 58'; Yanga-M'Biwa 66' | Report |

Stade de la Licorne, Amiens
Referee: Artur Soares Dias (Portugal)
7 September 2010
17:00 CET

| Ukraine | 0–0 | Slovenia |
|---|---|---|
| | Report |

Obolon Stadium, Kyiv
Referee: Raymond Crangle (Northern Ireland)

== Goalscorers ==
As of 3 September, there have been 37 goals scored over 18 games, for an average of 2.05 goals per game.

| Goals | Player | Country |
|---|---|---|
| 3 | Anthony Modeste | France |
| 3 | Rene Mihelič | Slovenia |
| 2 | Djamel Bakar | France |
| 2 | Volodymyr Chesnakov | Ukraine |
| 2 | Oleh Holodyuk | Ukraine |
| 2 | Yaroslav Rakytsky | Ukraine |

1 goal

Belgium
- Joeri Dequevy
- Ritchie Kitoko
- Sven Kums
- Romelu Lukaku
- Benjamin Mokulu
- Geoffrey Mujangi Bia
- Joachim Mununga
- Radja Nainggolan

France
- Karim Aït-Fana
- Emmanuel Rivière
- Mamadou Sakho
- Younousse Sankharé

Slovenia
- Leon Črnčič
- Danijel Marčeta
- Haris Vučkić

Ukraine
- Bohdan Butko
- Valeriy Fedorchuk
- Yevhen Konoplianka
- Yegor Lugachyov
- Mykola Morozyuk
- Andriy Yarmolenko
- Roman Zozulya

Own Goals

- (Slovenia) Matija Škarabot (for France)
