= Artem Dzyuba =

Russian footballer (born 1988)

Artyom Dzyuba
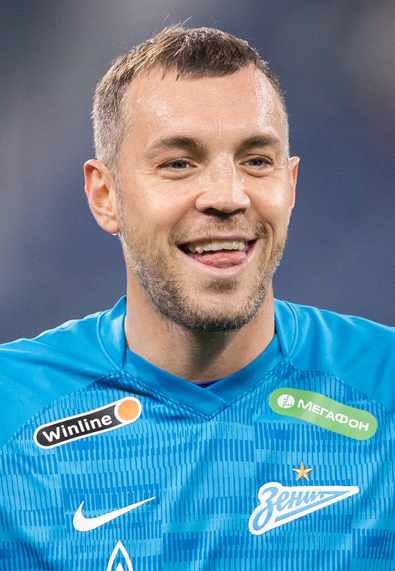
- Dzyuba with Zenit Saint Petersburg in 2021

Personal information
- Full name: Artyom Sergeyevich Dzyuba
- Date of birth: 22 August 1988 (age 38)
- Place of birth: Moscow, Russian SFSR, Soviet Union
- Height: 1.97 m (6 ft 6 in)
- Position: Striker

Youth career
- 1997–2002: Spartak Moscow
- 2002–2003: Sports School Football Depot
- 2003–2008: Spartak Moscow

Senior career*
Years	Team	Apps	(Gls)
2006–2015	Spartak Moscow	126	(26)
2009	→ Tom Tomsk (loan)	10	(3)
2010–2011	→ Tom Tomsk (loan)	24	(10)
2013–2014	→ Rostov (loan)	28	(17)
2015	→ Rostov (loan)	12	(1)
2015–2022	Zenit Saint Petersburg	181	(85)
2018	→ Arsenal Tula (loan)	10	(6)
2022	Adana Demirspor	4	(1)
2023–2024	Lokomotiv Moscow	32	(12)
2024–2026	Akron Tolyatti	48	(17)
Total		474	(178)

International career
2006	Russia U18	10	(8)
2007	Russia U19	12	(7)
2007–2010	Russia U21	9	(4)
2011	Russia B	2	(0)
2011–2025	Russia	56	(31)
- * Club domestic league appearances and goals as of 23 May 2026

Artem (or Artyom) Sergeyevich Dzyuba (Russian: Артём Сергеевич Дзюба, pronounced [ɐˈrtʲɵm sʲɪrˈɡʲe(j)ɪvʲɪdʑ ˈdzʲubə]; born 22 August 1988) is a Russian former professional footballer who played as a striker.

He began his career with Spartak Moscow, debuting in 2006 and making 166 appearances and scoring 38 goals. He also had two loans each at Tom Tomsk and Rostov, winning the 2013–14 Russian Cup with the latter. In 2015, he joined Zenit, winning 10 trophies with the club, including four Russian Premier League titles. He is the record holder for most goals scored in the Russian Premier League with 177. He is also the record holder for most goals scored by a Russian player for club and country with 248.

Dzyuba made his senior international debut for Russia in 2011. He represented the nation at UEFA Euro 2016, the 2018 FIFA World Cup and UEFA Euro 2020 and is the country's top scorer with 31 goals.

== Club career ==
Dzyuba was born in Moscow, Russian SFSR, Soviet Union, on 22 August 1988. His father, Sergey, is from Poltava Oblast, Ukraine and worked as a policeman, while his mother, Svetlana, is from Tsivilsk, Chuvashia and worked at a grocery store in Moscow, where she met his father.

He attended Spartak Moscow's football school and started playing for the team's reserves in 2005. In 2006, he first played for the first team in a Russian Cup match against FC Ural, replacing Roman Pavlyuchenko in the 85th minute. He had his first substitute appearance in the Russian Premier League in the 12th round against Saturn Moscow. He had 7 substitute appearances in that season, but did not score.

On 7 August 2009, Tom Tomsk signed the striker on loan until December 2009. In the 2013–14 Russian Premier League, Dzyuba scored 17 goals while loaned to Rostov.

=== Zenit ===
In 2015, he was signed for Zenit Saint Petersburg by André Villas-Boas. In the 2015–16 UEFA Champions League, Dzyuba managed to score a total of six goals in five consecutive matches. On 31 January 2018, he joined Arsenal Tula on loan for the remainder of the 2017–18 season. He became the joint top scorer of the 2019–20 Russian Premier League with 17 goals, tied with his teammate Sardar Azmoun. That season he also provide the most assists for a second season in a row. On 25 July 2020, he scored a late penalty to hand Zenit the 2019–20 Russian Cup. On 7 August 2020, he scored the first goal in a 2–1 victory over Lokomotiv Moscow to win the 2020 Russian Super Cup. On 2 May 2021, he scored twice as Zenit secured their third title in a row in a 6–1 victory over second-place FC Lokomotiv Moscow. On the last match day of the 2020–21 league season on 16 May 2021, he scored 4 goals against FC Tambov, bringing his total to 20 and overtaking his teammate Sardar Azmoun (who had 19 goals) as the top goal scorer. On 16 October 2021 in a game against FC Arsenal Tula he scored his 100th goal for Zenit. On 29 October 2021 in a game against FC Dynamo Moscow, he scored his 144th goal in the Russian Premier League, becoming the league's record holder for the number of goals scored.

On 22 May 2022, Zenit announced that Dzyuba would leave the club when his contract expired in July. In July 2022, Dzyuba began training with FC Rubin Kazan to maintain fitness. Dzyuba ultimately refused a contract offer from the club.

=== Adana Demirspor ===
On 18 August 2022, Turkish Süper Lig team Adana Demirspor announced the signing of Artem Dzyuba. His contract was annulled on 3 November 2022.

=== Lokomotiv Moscow ===
On 8 February 2023, Artem Dzyuba signed a contract with Lokomotiv Moscow until the end of the 2022–23 season. On the same day, Lokomotiv signed Igor Smolnikov, who at that point played over 100 games as Dzyuba's teammate at Zenit and the national team. In his league debut for Lokomotiv on 4 March 2023, he scored a hat-trick in a 3–1 away victory over FC Rostov.

On 25 May 2023, Dzyuba extended his contract with Lokomotiv for the 2023–24 season, with an option for 2024–25.

On 29 May 2024, Lokomotiv announced that Dzyuba left the club as his contract expired.

=== Akron Tolyatti ===
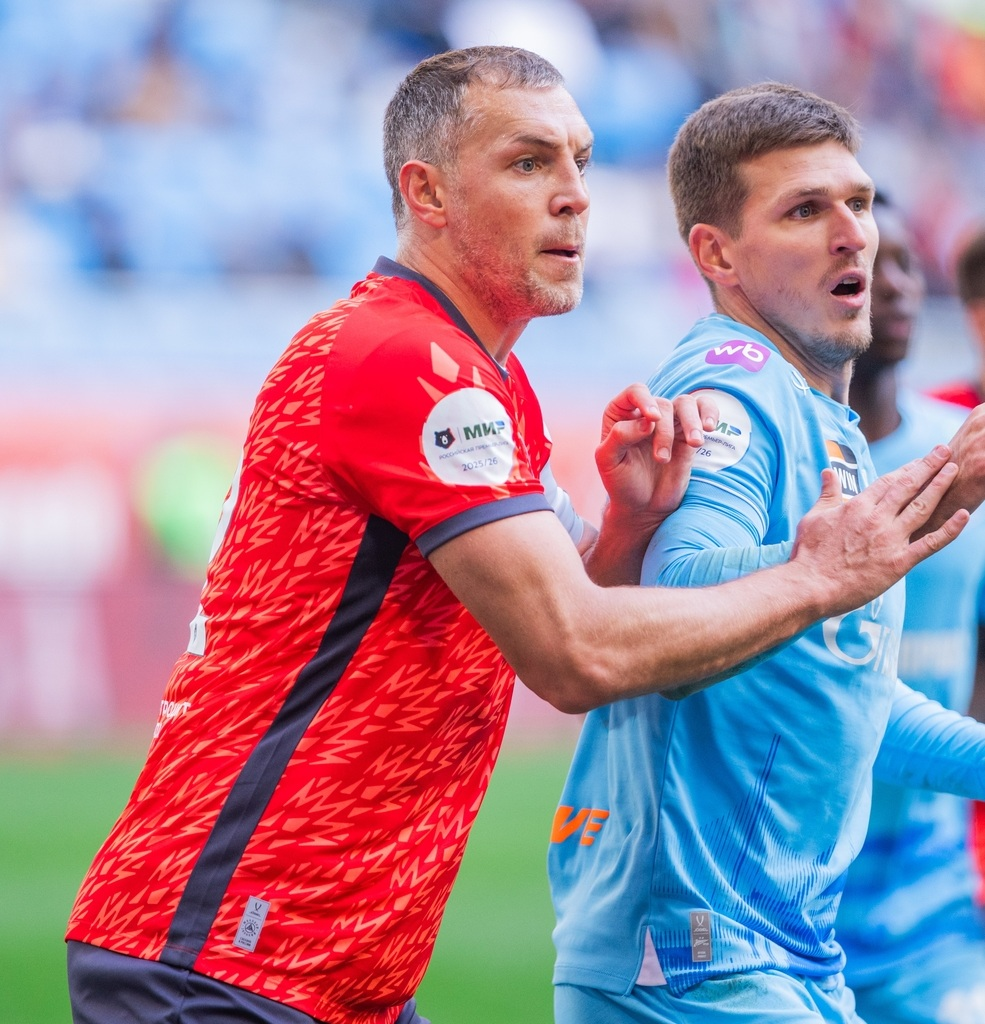
Artem Dzyuba with Akron in 2025.

On 12 September 2024, Dzyuba signed a contract for the 2024–25 season with Russian Premier League newcomers Akron Tolyatti. On 7 December 2024, Dzyuba scored the winning goal in Akron's away 2–1 victory over his former club and the defending champions, Zenit St. Petersburg. On 9 March 2025, Dzyuba scored his 234th career goal for club and country, setting a record for most goals by a Russian player, overtaking Aleksandr Kerzhakov.

On 1 June 2025, Dzyuba signed a new one-season contract with Akron. He left Akron at the end of the 2025–26 season.

He ended his professional career in 2026.

== International career ==
Dzyuba was a part of the Russia U21 side that was competing in the 2011 European Under-21 Championship qualification. He made his national team debut on 11 November 2011 in a friendly against Greece. He was called up to the provisional squad for UEFA Euro 2012. He was not included on the finalized squad that Dick Advocaat chose for the competition.

After the 2014 World Cup, which Dzyuba also missed with Fabio Capello preferring Aleksandr Kokorin and Aleksandr Kerzhakov instead, he started to be called up regularly during the UEFA Euro 2016 qualifying. He scored his first goal against Liechtenstein on 8 September 2014, his side's final goal in a 4–0 rout of the minnows at the Arena Khimki. Exactly a year later, he scored four goals in a 7–0 win over the same opponents in the reverse fixture; he ended the campaign as Russia's top goalscorer with eight goals as they qualified for UEFA Euro 2016.

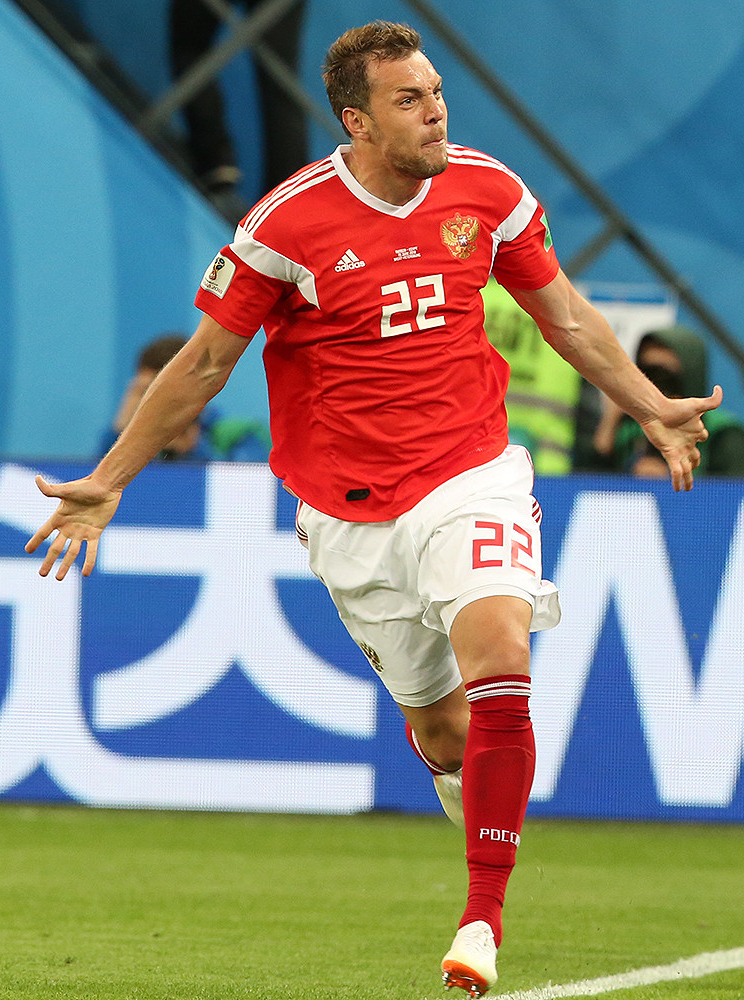
Dzyuba playing with Russia at the 2018 FIFA World Cup.

On 11 May 2018, he was included in Russia's extended 2018 FIFA World Cup squad, and on 3 June, he was included in the final edition. He came on as a substitute in the opening game on 14 June and scored the third goal of a 5–0 win over Saudi Arabia. He continued his impressive performance by scoring a goal in the second match that Russia beat Egypt 3–1, sending Russia to the knockout stage for the first time. In the match against Spain in the Round of 16 on 1 July, he converted a penalty minutes before half-time, making the score 1–1. Dzyuba was then substituted in the second half and Russia eventually won the game 4–3 on penalties.

After the retirement of Sergei Ignashevich and Igor Akinfeev from the national team, Dzyuba became the team's captain. On 9 June 2019, he scored four goals in a UEFA Euro 2020 qualifying match against San Marino which ended in a 9–0 home rout, with Russia recording their biggest ever win while he took his international tally up to 20 goals. On 10 October, he scored his 23rd international goal, overhauling fellow Roman Pavlyuchenko in the tally.

On 8 November 2020, Dzyuba was dropped from the national team ahead of the Nations League matches against Moldova, Turkey, and Serbia, after an explicit video depicting him masturbating leaked and went viral.

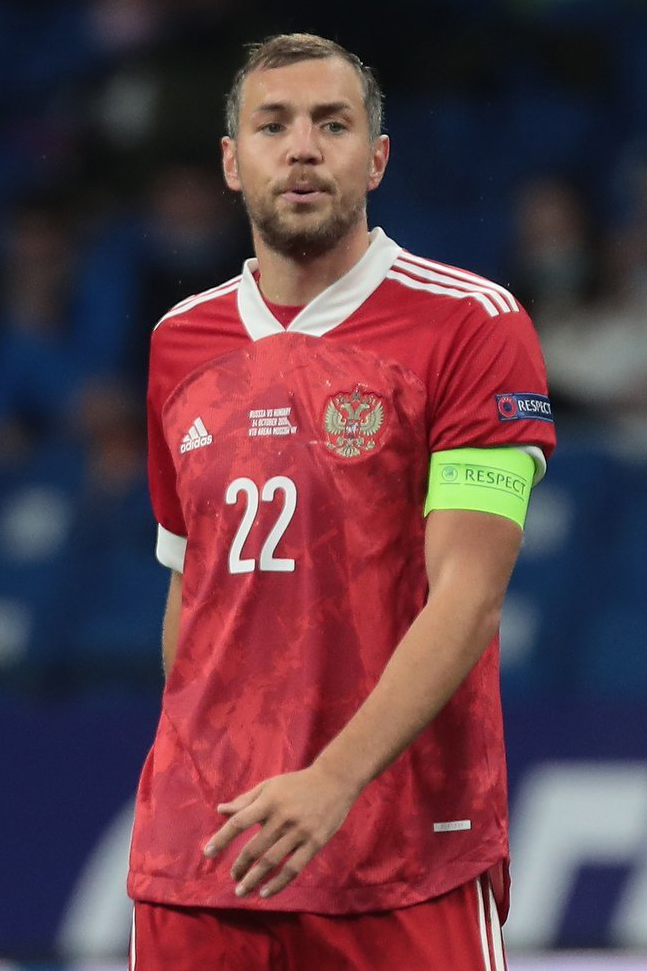
Artem Dzyuba with Russia in 2020.

On 11 May 2021, he was included in the preliminary extended 30-man squad for UEFA Euro 2020. On 2 June 2021, he was included in the final squad. He played the full match in Russia's opening game against Belgium on 12 June 2021 as Russia lost 3–0. He played 83 minutes in Russia's second game against Finland on 16 June 2021 as Russia won 1–0, and assisted on Aleksei Miranchuk's winning goal. On 21 June, he played all 90 minutes of Russia's final game against Denmark, scoring Russia's only goal from a penalty kick. They lost 4–1, and Russia were eliminated from the competition. However, with that goal against Denmark, he equaled Aleksandr Kerzhakov's record of 30 goals as all-time top scorer of the national team.

After a four-year break from international duty, Dzyuba was re-called for the friendlies against Grenada and Zambia in March 2025. He scored his 31st international goal against Grenada, overtaking Kerzhakov on the all-time national team goalscorer list.

== Personal life ==
Dzyuba has three sons with his wife Kristina.

On 2 March 2022, Dzyuba and several other Russian players were tagged in an Instagram video by Ukrainian footballer Andriy Yarmolenko who criticized them for being silent during the Russian invasion of Ukraine. In the video, Yarmolenko said "I know that some of you like to show your balls on camera but now it is time for you to show your balls in real life", referring to Dzyuba's viral sex tape. Dzyuba subsequently wrote an Instagram post stating that he is proud of his country. He refused to condemn Russia's actions in Ukraine and maintained that the people of Russia are victims of double standards and racial discrimination. In March 2023, Dzyuba was added to Myrotvorets' list of people who are considered, by the authors of the website, to be "enemies of Ukraine".

== Career statistics ==
=== Club ===
As of match played 23 May 2026

Appearances and goals by club, season and competition
Club	Season	League			National cup (Note: Includes Russian Cup, Turkish Cup)		Europe		Other		Total	
Club	Season	Division	Apps	Goals	Apps	Goals	Apps	Goals	Apps	Goals	Apps	Goals
Spartak Moscow	2006	Russian Premier League	5	0	2	0	1	0	—		8	0
Spartak Moscow	2007	Russian Premier League	16	1	4	2	6	2	1 (Note: Appearance in Russian Super Cup)	0	27	5
Spartak Moscow	2008	Russian Premier League	16	1	1	2	5	3	—		22	6
Spartak Moscow	2009	Russian Premier League	8	2	1	0	—		—		9	2
Spartak Moscow	2010	Russian Premier League	2	0	—		—		—		2	0
Spartak Moscow	2011–12	Russian Premier League	41	11	3	1	8	2	—		52	14
Spartak Moscow	2012–13	Russian Premier League	25	4	1	0	6	0	—		32	4
Spartak Moscow	2014–15	Russian Premier League	13	7	1	0	—		—		14	7
Spartak Moscow	Total		126	26	13	5	26	7	1	0	166	38
Tom Tomsk (loan)	2009	Russian Premier League	10	3	—		—		—		10	3
Tom Tomsk (loan)	2010	Russian Premier League	24	10	1	1	—		—		25	11
Tom Tomsk (loan)	Total		34	13	1	1	0	0	0	0	35	14
Rostov (loan)	2013–14	Russian Premier League	28	17	3	2	—		—		31	19
Rostov (loan)	2014–15	Russian Premier League	11	1	—		—		1 (Note: Appearances in relegation play-offs)	0	12	1
Rostov (loan)	Total		39	18	3	2	0	0	1	0	43	20
Zenit Saint Petersburg	2015–16	Russian Premier League	30	15	5	2	8	6	1	0	44	23
Zenit Saint Petersburg	2016–17	Russian Premier League	26	13	1	0	6	1	1	0	34	14
Zenit Saint Petersburg	2017–18	Russian Premier League	15	1	1	0	8	1	—		24	2
Zenit Saint Petersburg	2018–19	Russian Premier League	27	8	1	0	9	5	—		37	13
Zenit Saint Petersburg	2019–20	Russian Premier League	28	17	2	2	6	2	1	0	37	21
Zenit Saint Petersburg	2020–21	Russian Premier League	27	20	1	0	5	1	1	1	34	22
Zenit Saint Petersburg	2021–22	Russian Premier League	28	11	2	1	8	1	1	0	39	13
Zenit Saint Petersburg	Total		181	85	13	5	50	17	5	1	249	108
Arsenal Tula (loan)	2017–18	Russian Premier League	10	6	—		—		—		10	6
Adana Demirspor	2022–23	Süper Lig	4	1	1	0	—		—		5	1
Lokomotiv Moscow	2022–23	Russian Premier League	11	8	2	0	—		—		13	8
Lokomotiv Moscow	2023–24	Russian Premier League	21	4	5	0	—		—		26	4
Lokomotiv Moscow	Total		32	12	7	0	—		—		39	12
Akron Tolyatti	2024–25	Russian Premier League	22	9	2	1	—		—		24	10
Akron Tolyatti	2025–26	Russian Premier League	26	8	0	0	—		2	0	28	8
Akron Tolyatti	Total		48	17	2	1	0	0	2	0	52	18
Career total			474	178	40	14	76	24	9	1	599	217

=== International ===
Russia
Year	Apps	Goals
2011	1	0
2012	1	0
2013	1	0
2014	5	2
2015	7	6
2016	7	3
2017	0	0
2018	10	4
2019	10	9
2020	5	2
2021	8	4
2025	1	1
Total	56	31

Scores and results list Russia's goal tally first.

List of international goals scored by Artem Dzyuba
No.	Date	Venue	Cap	Opponent	Score	Result	Competition
1.	8 September 2014	Arena Khimki, Khimki, Russia	4	Liechtenstein	4–0	4–0	UEFA Euro 2016 qualifying
2.	12 October 2014	Otkritie Arena, Moscow, Russia	6	Moldova	1–0	1–1	UEFA Euro 2016 qualifying
3.	5 September 2015	Otkritie Arena, Moscow, Russia	10	Sweden	1–0	1–0	UEFA Euro 2016 qualifying
4.	8 September 2015	Rheinpark Stadion, Vaduz, Liechtenstein	11	Liechtenstein	1–0	7–0	UEFA Euro 2016 qualifying
5.	8 September 2015	Rheinpark Stadion, Vaduz, Liechtenstein	11	Liechtenstein	3–0	7–0	UEFA Euro 2016 qualifying
6.	8 September 2015	Rheinpark Stadion, Vaduz, Liechtenstein	11	Liechtenstein	4–0	7–0	UEFA Euro 2016 qualifying
7.	8 September 2015	Rheinpark Stadion, Vaduz, Liechtenstein	11	Liechtenstein	7–0	7–0	UEFA Euro 2016 qualifying
8.	9 October 2015	Zimbru Stadium, Chișinău, Moldova	12	Moldova	2–0	2–1	UEFA Euro 2016 qualifying
9.	5 June 2016	Stade Louis II, Fontvieille, Monaco	18	Serbia	1–0	1–1	Friendly
10.	9 October 2016	Krasnodar Stadium, Krasnodar, Russia	22	Costa Rica	2–3	3–4	Friendly
11.	9 October 2016	Krasnodar Stadium, Krasnodar, Russia	22	Costa Rica	3–3	3–4	Friendly
12.	14 June 2018	Luzhniki Stadium, Moscow, Russia	24	Saudi Arabia	3–0	5–0	2018 FIFA World Cup
13.	19 June 2018	Saint Petersburg Stadium, Saint Petersburg, Russia	25	Egypt	3–0	3–1	2018 FIFA World Cup
14.	1 July 2018	Luzhniki Stadium, Moscow, Russia	27	Spain	1–1	1–1	2018 FIFA World Cup
15.	7 September 2018	Şenol Güneş Stadium, Trabzon, Turkey	29	Turkey	2–1	2–1	2018–19 UEFA Nations League B
16.	24 March 2019	Astana Arena, Nur-Sultan, Kazakhstan	34	Kazakhstan	3–0	4–0	UEFA Euro 2020 qualifying
17.	8 June 2019	Mordovia Arena, Saransk, Russia	35	San Marino	2–0	9–0	UEFA Euro 2020 qualifying
18.	8 June 2019	Mordovia Arena, Saransk, Russia	35	San Marino	5–0	9–0	UEFA Euro 2020 qualifying
19.	8 June 2019	Mordovia Arena, Saransk, Russia	35	San Marino	6–0	9–0	UEFA Euro 2020 qualifying
20.	8 June 2019	Mordovia Arena, Saransk, Russia	35	San Marino	9–0	9–0	UEFA Euro 2020 qualifying
21.	6 September 2019	Hampden Park, Glasgow, Scotland	37	Scotland	1–1	2–1	UEFA Euro 2020 qualifying
22.	10 October 2019	Luzhniki Stadium, Moscow, Russia	39	Scotland	1–0	4–0	UEFA Euro 2020 qualifying
23.	10 October 2019	Luzhniki Stadium, Moscow, Russia	39	Scotland	3–0	4–0	UEFA Euro 2020 qualifying
24.	13 October 2019	GSP Stadium, Nicosia, Cyprus	40	Cyprus	3–0	5–0	UEFA Euro 2020 qualifying
25.	3 September 2020	VTB Arena, Moscow, Russia	43	Serbia	1–0	3–1	2020–21 UEFA Nations League B
26.	3 September 2020	VTB Arena, Moscow, Russia	43	Serbia	3–1	3–1	2020–21 UEFA Nations League B
27.	24 March 2021	National Stadium, Ta' Qali, Malta	48	Malta	1–0	3–1	2022 FIFA World Cup qualification
28.	27 March 2021	Fisht Olympic Stadium, Sochi, Russia	49	Slovenia	1–0	2–1	2022 FIFA World Cup qualification
29.	27 March 2021	Fisht Olympic Stadium, Sochi, Russia	49	Slovenia	2–0	2–1	2022 FIFA World Cup qualification
30.	21 June 2021	Parken Stadium, Copenhagen, Denmark	55	Denmark	1–2	1–4	UEFA Euro 2020
31.	19 March 2025	VTB Arena, Moscow, Russia	56	Grenada	3–0	5–0	Friendly

== Honours ==
Rostov

- Russian Cup: 2013–14

Zenit Saint Petersburg

- Russian Premier League: 2018–19, 2019–20, 2020–21, 2021–22
- Russian Cup: 2015–16, 2019–20
- Russian Super Cup: 2015, 2016, 2020, 2021

Individual

- Spartak Small Golden Boar Award: 2006
- Russian Premier League Player of the Month: July 2013, August 2014, July 2015, August 2018, April 2019, September 2021, March 2023
- Russian Premier League Goal of the Month: April 2023
- FC Rostov Fans' Player of the Year: 2013–14
- Futbol Footballer of the Year: 2018
- RFU Footballer of the Year: 2018–19
- Sport-Express Footballer of the Year: 2018–19
- Russian Premier League Forward of the Season: 2018–19, 2020–21
- RB Awards – Sportsman of the Year 2020
- Russian Premier League Top scorer: 2019–20 (17 goals), 2020–21 (20 goals)
- Russian Premier League Top assist provider: 2018–19, 2019–20
- Best scorer in the Russian Premier League history.
