= Juan Carlos Escobar =

Colombian footballer (born 1982)

Personal information
- Full name: Juan Carlos Escobar Rodríguez
- Date of birth: October 30, 1982 (age 43)
- Place of birth: Cali, Colombia
- Height: 1.84 m (6 ft 0 in)
- Position: Defensive midfielder

Senior career*
Years	Team	Apps	(Gls)
2002	Deportes Quindío	11	(1)
2002	Deportivo Pereira	0	(0)
2003	Atlético Huila	13	(1)
2004–2007	Deportes Tolima	86	(7)
2007–2011	Krylia Sovetov Samara	46	(1)
2009	→ Cúcuta Deportivo (loan)	13	(1)
2010	→ Deportivo Cali (loan)	10	(0)
2012	Deportes Tolima	8	(1)
2012	América de Cali	12	(0)
2013	Patriotas FC	6	(0)
2013	Alianza Petrolera	6	(0)
2014	Deportivo Pasto	21	(0)
2015	Uniautónoma	5	(0)

International career
2006–2009	Colombia	8	(0)
- * Club domestic league appearances and goals

Juan Carlos Escobar Rodríguez (born 30 October 1982) is a Colombian former football defensive midfielder.
