= Artur Kulumbegov =

Russian footballer

Personal information
- Full name: Artur Akhsarovich Kulumbegov
- Date of birth: 6 August 1982 (age 44)
- Place of birth: Ordzhonikidze, Russian SFSR
- Height: 1.75 m (5 ft 9 in)
- Position: Midfielder

Youth career
- Yunost Vladikavkaz
- FC Lokomotiv Moscow

Senior career*
| Years | Team | Apps | (Gls) |
| 2000 | FC Saturn-2 Ramenskoye | 8 | (0) |
| 2001–2005 | FC Dynamo Makhachkala | 136 | (10) |
| 2005–2007 | FC Spartak-MZhK Ryazan | 61 | (14) |
| 2007 | FC Alania Vladikavkaz | 8 | (1) |
| 2008 | FC Zvezda Irkutsk | 8 | (0) |
| 2008–2010 | FC Dynamo Bryansk | 69 | (1) |
| 2011–2012 | FC Dynamo Stavropol | 26 | (9) |
| 2012 | FC Lokomotiv Liski | 3 | (0) |
| 2013 | FC Biolog-Novokubansk Progress | 11 | (1) |
- * Club domestic league appearances and goals

Artur Akhsarovich Kulumbegov (Russian: Артур Ахсарович Кулумбегов; born 6 August 1982) is a former Russian professional football player.

== Club career ==
He played 6 seasons in the Russian Football National League for 5 different teams.
