= Aleksandr Karakin =

Russian footballer (1991–2023)

Personal information
- Full name: Aleksandr Sergeyevich Karakin
- Date of birth: 6 March 1991
- Place of birth: Moscow, Russian SFSR, USSR
- Date of death: 12 May 2023 (aged 32)
- Place of death: Moscow, Russia
- Height: 1.82 m (6 ft 0 in)
- Position: Defender

Youth career
- FC Torpedo Moscow
- FC Spartak Moscow

Senior career*
Years	Team	Apps	(Gls)
2008	FC Spartak Moscow	0	(0)
2009–2010	FC Dynamo Moscow	0	(0)
2011–2012	FC Khimki	6	(0)
2013–2014	FC Prialit Reutov		
- * Club domestic league appearances and goals

Aleksandr Sergeyevich Karakin (Russian: Александр Серге́евич Каракин; 6 March 1991 – 12 May 2023) was a Russian footballer who played as a defender.

== Career ==
Karakin made his Russian Football National League debut for FC Khimki on 22 August 2011 in a game against Gazovik Orenburg.

== Death ==
Karakin died in a traffic collision on 12 May 2023, at the age of 32.
