= Amir Bazhev =

Russian professional footballer

Personal information
- Full name: Amir Khautiyevich Bazhev
- Date of birth: 15 October 1988 (age 38)
- Place of birth: Argudan, Kabardino-Balkaria, Russian SFSR
- Height: 1.79 m (5 ft 10 in)
- Position: Midfielder

Youth career
- –2001: Bedik Argudan
- 2001–2003: FC Spartak Moscow

Senior career*
Years	Team	Apps	(Gls)
2004–2009	FC Spartak Moscow	0	(0)
2007	→ FC Spartak-MZhK Ryazan (loan)	20	(2)
2008	→ FC SKA Rostov-on-Don (loan)	13	(2)
2009	→ FC Salyut-Energia Belgorod (loan)	15	(6)
2010–2012	FC Salyut Belgorod	71	(19)
2013	FC Fakel Voronezh	7	(3)
2013	FC Zenit Penza	20	(2)
2014–2017	PFC Spartak Nalchik	82	(16)
2017–2018	FC Luch-Energiya Vladivostok	24	(1)
2018	PFC Spartak Nalchik	16	(4)
2020–2021	Al-Ahli		
2021–2022	PFC Spartak Nalchik	15	(2)

International career
2004	Russia U16	8	(5)
2005	Russia U17	8	(6)
2006	Russia U18	2	(3)
- * Club domestic league appearances and goals

Amir Khautiyevich Bazhev (Russian: Амир Хаутиевич Бажев; born 15 October 1988) is a Russian former professional footballer who played as a midfielder.

== Club career ==
Bazhev made his professional debut in the Russian First Division in 2007 for FC Spartak-MZhK Ryazan. He played in one Russian Cup game for the main FC Spartak Moscow squad.
