= Renat Sabitov =

Russian footballer

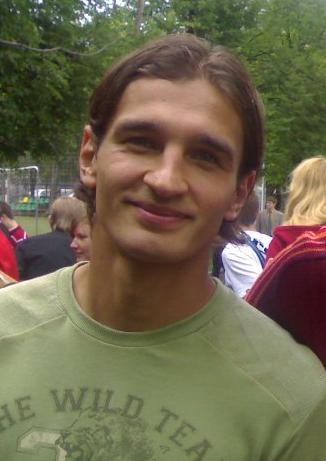

Personal information
- Full name: Renat Harisovich Sabitov
- Date of birth: 13 June 1985 (age 41)
- Place of birth: Moscow, Soviet Union
- Height: 1.86 m (6 ft 1 in)
- Positions: Defensive midfielder; centre back

Team information
- Current team: FC Kosmos Dolgoprudny (assistant coach)

Youth career
- Chertanovo Education Center

Senior career*
Years	Team	Apps	(Gls)
2002–2003	FC Khimki	0	(0)
2004–2006	FC Saturn Ramenskoye	29	(1)
2007–2010	FC Spartak Moscow	53	(0)
2008	→ FC Khimki (loan)	17	(0)
2011	FC Tom Tomsk	27	(0)
2012	FC Sibir Novosibirsk	9	(0)
2012–2015	FC Tom Tomsk	56	(2)
2015–2016	FC Sokol Saratov	35	(0)
2016–2018	FC Mordovia Saransk	53	(1)
2018–2019	FC Sokol Saratov	15	(1)
2019–2020	FSC Dolgoprudny	16	(1)
2020–2021	FC Olimp-Dolgoprudny	14	(1)
2021–2022	FC Olimp-Dolgoprudny-2	0	(0)

International career
2005–2006	Russia U-21	7	(0)

Managerial career
- 2022: FC Olimp-Dolgoprudny-2
- 2022–: FC Kosmos Dolgoprudny
- * Club domestic league appearances and goals

Renat Kharisovich Sabitov (Russian: Ренат Харисович Сабитов; born 13 June 1985) is a Russian football coach and a former player of Tatar origin. He is an assistant coach with FC Kosmos Dolgoprudny. Previously, he played for Saturn and Spartak Moscow. Contrary to popular belief, he is not son or relative of coach Ravil Sabitov.

== Club career ==
Born in Moscow, he came into football through Chertanovo football school. In 2001, he signed for FC Khimki's amateur team and played the next two years in the Russian Amateur Football League. In beginning of 2004, he signed for Saturn Moscow Oblast, but had played his first match only on 22 May 2005 (vs. Krylya Sovetov). About that time, Sabitov started playing for the Russia U21 team. His contract with Saturn was about to end on 15 February 2007, but in December 2006, he refused to renew it and was subsequently bought by Spartak for approximately $200,000 to be able to start pre-season training with his new team immediately.

== Career statistics ==
As of 26 July 2010

Club	Div	Season	League		Cup		Europe		Total	
Club	Div	Season	Apps	Goals	Apps	Goals	Apps	Goals	Apps	Goals
(Russia) Saturn Ramenskoye	D1	2005	16	0	1	0	—		17	0
(Russia) Saturn Ramenskoye	D1	2006	13	1	7	1	—		20	2
(Russia) Saturn Ramenskoye	Total		29	1	8	1	0	0	37	2
(Russia) Spartak Moscow	D1	2007	15	0	3	0	1	0	19	0
(Russia) Spartak Moscow	D1	2008	3	0	0	0	1	0	4	0
(Russia) Spartak Moscow	Total		18	0	3	0	2	0	23	0
(Russia) FC Khimki	D1	2008	16	0	1	0	—		17	0
(Russia) FC Khimki	Total		16	0	1	0	0	0	17	0
(Russia) Spartak Moscow	D1	2009	18	0	2	0	—		20	0
(Russia) Spartak Moscow	D1	2010	10	0	1	0	0	0	11	0
(Russia) Spartak Moscow	Total		28	0	3	0	0	0	31	0
Career total			91	1	15	1	2	0	108	2
