= Vladislav Ryzhkov =

Russian footballer

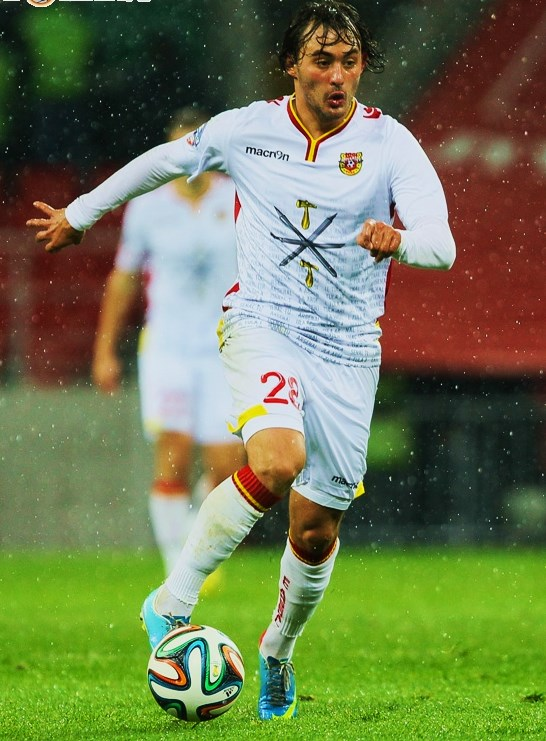

Personal information
- Full name: Vladislav Alekseyevich Ryzhkov
- Date of birth: 28 February 1990 (age 36)
- Place of birth: Voronezh, Soviet Union
- Height: 1.75 m (5 ft 9 in)
- Position: Midfielder

Youth career
- 2006–2008: Spartak Moscow

Senior career*
Years	Team	Apps	(Gls)
2008–2010	Spartak Moscow	9	(1)
2010	→ Shinnik Yaroslavl (loan)	17	(0)
2010–2011	Zhemchuzhina Sochi	20	(5)
2011	Kuban Krasnodar	1	(0)
2012	Volga Nizhny Novgorod	6	(0)
2013	Sibir Novosibirsk	33	(5)
2014–2018	Arsenal Tula	65	(7)
2017–2018	→ Tambov (loan)	22	(1)
2018	Sibir Novosibirsk	11	(0)
2019	Vitebsk	12	(1)
2019–2020	Urozhay Krasnodar	13	(1)

International career
2009	Russia U-21	2	(1)
- * Club domestic league appearances and goals

Vladislav Alekseyevich Ryzhkov (Russian: Владислав Алексеевич Рыжков; born 28 February 1990) is a Russian former footballer.

== Club career ==
He made his debut for the FC Spartak Moscow first team on 31 August 2008 when he came on as a substitute with 2 minutes left to play in a game against FC Spartak Nalchik. He started the next game against FC Moscow on 13 September 2008 and scored a goal in that game.

== International career ==
Ryzhkov was a part of the Russia U-21 side that was competing in the 2011 European Under-21 Championship qualification.
