= Ignas Dedura =

Lithuanian footballer (born 1978)

Personal information
- Date of birth: 6 January 1978 (age 48)
- Place of birth: Kaunas, Lithuanian SSR, Soviet Union
- Height: 1.90 m (6 ft 3 in)
- Position: Centre-back

Senior career*
Years	Team	Apps	(Gls)
1997–2000	FBK Kaunas	105	(13)
2001	Torpedo-ZIL	10	(0)
2001–2004	Skonto FC	79	(8)
2004–2009	Spartak Moscow	42	(3)
2010	Salyut Belgorod	7	(0)
2011–2012	FK Ekranas	59	(6)
2013–2019	Kauno Žalgiris	94	(5)
2020	FC Hegelmann		

International career
1997–2010	Lithuania	47	(1)
- * Club domestic league appearances and goals

Ignas Dedura (born 6 January 1978) is a Lithuanian former professional footballer who played as a centre-back.

== Club career ==
Dedura began his career at FBK Kaunas in 1997, scoring 13 goals in 105 appearances, before moving to Russia in 2001 where he played for Torpedo-ZIL. He only made ten appearances for the club and later that year he moved to Latvian club Skonto FC where he stayed until 2004, making 79 appearances and scoring eight goals. In 2004, together with his manager Aleksandrs Starkovs, he moved once again to Russia, this time to play for Spartak Moscow where he played until 2009. After unsuccessful spell with Salyut Belgorod in 2010, in February 2011 Dedura returned to Lithuania and signed a two-year deal with FK Ekranas. In both of those seasons Deduras was a regular player in the team, as well as winning the league in both of those years. At the end of his second season he didn't extend his contract due to the club having financial issues and not being able to pay the wages. In winter 2013 Dedura joined very young I lyga, which was a 2nd tier of Lithuanian football pyramid, side Kauno Žalgiris. After being revealed, the defender expressed his desire to become a coach one day, as he was also instantly promoted to being a captain and a playing coach.

== International career ==
Dedura played for the Lithuania national team.
