= Nikolai Ivanov (football referee) =

Russian football referee (born 1964)

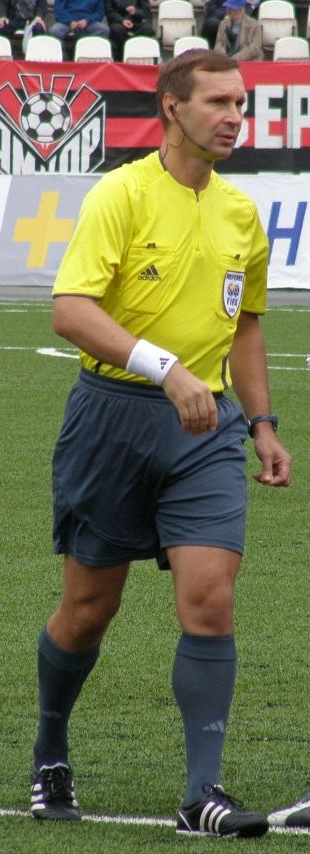
- Born: Nikolai Vladimirovich Ivanov; January 24, 1964 (age 62); Leningrad, RSFSR, USSR
- Years active: 2000 — present

Nikolai Vladimirovich Ivanov (Russian: Николай Владимирович Иванов; born January 24, 1964, in Leningrad (now Saint Petersburg)) is a Russian football referee. He has been a FIFA international referee since 2000. He lives in Saint Petersburg and is educated as an engineer. He has refereed games in the UEFA Champions League, UEFA Cup and qualifiers for 2006 FIFA World Cup, 2010 FIFA World Cup and UEFA Euro 2008.
