= Alexei Kovalev (referee) =

Russian footballer and referee

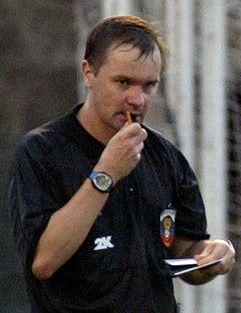
Kovalev in 2007

Alexei Borisovich Kovalev (Russian: Алексе́й Бори́сович Ковалёв; born 10 August 1973 in Tambov, USSR) is a Russian former football referee. In his youth, he was a football player. He played as a midfielder for the amateur team FC Lokomotiv Tambov.

Kovalev began his refereeing career in 1993 and, since 2006, he officiated matches in the Russian championship, at a regional level. He is the Chairman of the Board of Tambov Football Federation referees. in 2008, Kovalev took third place in the contest Golden mantle, awarded to the best referees of Russia. He retired as a referee in 2016.
