= Yevgeni Andreyev (footballer) =

Russian professional football player

Personal information
- Full name: Yevgeni Stepanovich Andreyev
- Date of birth: 11 March 1988 (age 38)
- Place of birth: Elista, Russian SFSR
- Height: 1.79 m (5 ft 10 1/2 in)
- Position: Midfielder

Senior career*
Years	Team	Apps	(Gls)
2005–2008	FC Spartak Moscow	0	(0)
2008–2010	FC Irtysh Omsk	64	(14)
2011–2013	FC Torpedo Moscow	39	(0)
2013	FC Zenit Penza	5	(0)
2013–2015	FC Irtysh Omsk	33	(2)
2015	FC Novokuznetsk	16	(0)
2016	FC Nosta Novotroitsk	22	(2)
2017	FC Syzran-2003	17	(1)
2018–2019	FC Tekstilshchik Ivanovo	36	(3)
2020	FC Luki-Energiya Velikiye Luki	0	(0)

International career
2006	Russia U-18	7	(1)
2007	Russia U-19	4	(0)
- * Club domestic league appearances and goals

Yevgeni Stepanovich Andreyev (Russian: Евгений Степанович Андреев; born 11 March 1988) is a Russian former professional football player.

== Club career ==
He made his Russian Football National League debut for FC Irtysh Omsk on 27 March 2010 in a game against FC Nizhny Novgorod.

== Honours ==
- Russian Second Division, Zone East best midfielder: 2009.
