= Artur Maloyan =

Russian footballer (born 1989)

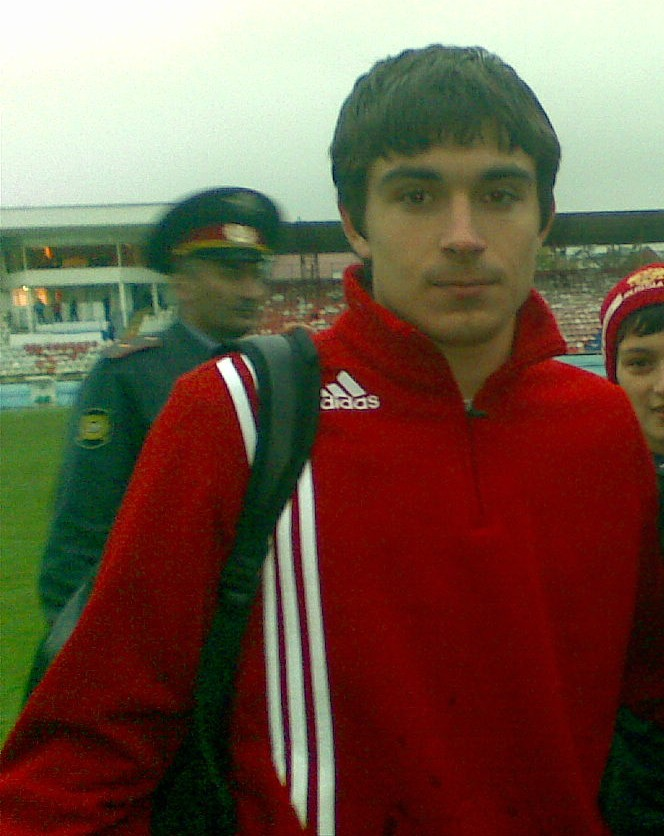

Personal information
- Full name: Artur Mikhaylovich Maloyan
- Date of birth: 4 February 1989 (age 37)
- Place of birth: Krasnodar, Soviet Union
- Height: 1.80 m (5 ft 11 in)
- Position: Attacking midfielder

Youth career
- 2005–2008: Spartak Moscow

Senior career*
Years	Team	Apps	(Gls)
2008–2012	Spartak Moscow	5	(0)
2009	→ Anzhi Makhachkala (loan)	12	(1)
2010	→ Ural Sverdlovsk Oblast (loan)	23	(3)
2011	→ Dynamo Bryansk (loan)	11	(1)
2013–2016	Shinnik Yaroslavl	63	(11)
2014–2015	→ Arsenal Tula (loan)	22	(3)
2016	Mordovia Saransk	3	(0)
2016–2018	Yenisey Krasnoyarsk	47	(7)
2018	→ Tyumen (loan)	15	(1)
2019	Urozhay Krasnodar	9	(2)
2019–2020	Alania Vladikavkaz	18	(4)
2021	FC Forte Taganrog	32	(7)

International career
2009	Russia U21	1	(0)
- * Club domestic league appearances and goals

Artur Mikhaylovich Maloyan (Armenian: Արթուր Մալոյան, Russian: Арту́р Миха́йлович Малоя́н; born on 4 February 1989) is a Russian former professional footballer who played as an attacking midfielder.

== Club career ==
=== Spartak Moscow ===
Maloyan made his debut for the main Spartak squad in the Russian Premier League game against Luch-Energiya Vladivostok on 16 November 2008.

=== Anzhi ===
Maloyan played in the Russian First Division season 2009 for Anzhi Makhachkala on loan from Spartak Moscow.

=== Tyumen ===
Maloyan joined Tyumen on loan for the 2018–19 season. In November 2018 his loan contract was terminated, and he returned to Yenisey Krasnoyarsk, but was not allowed to train with the main squad there either.

=== Urozhay ===
On 31 January 2019, Maloyan signed a 2.5-year contract with Urozhay Krasnodar.

== International career ==
Maloyan made his debut for the Russia U21 national team against Andorra U21 on 1 April 2009.
