= Nikita Bazhenov =

Russian footballer

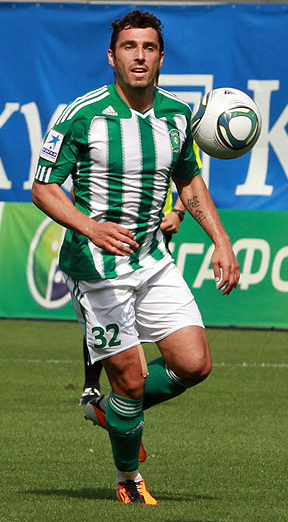
- Bazhenov with Tom Tomsk in 2011

Personal information
- Full name: Nikita Aleksandrovich Bazhenov
- Date of birth: 1 February 1985 (age 41)
- Place of birth: Bolshoye Bunkovo, Noginsky District, Moscow Oblast, Russian SFSR
- Height: 1.78 m (5 ft 10 in)
- Position: Striker

Youth career
- Torpedo Lyubertsy

Senior career*
Years	Team	Apps	(Gls)
2001–2004	FC Saturn Moscow Oblast	12	(5)
2004–2010	FC Spartak Moscow	104	(17)
2011–2016	FC Tom Tomsk	125	(18)
2017	FSC Dolgoprudny	13	(9)
2018	FC Okzhetpes	24	(16)
2019–2020	FSC Dolgoprudny	15	(8)
2020–2021	FC Olimp-Dolgoprudny	13	(4)
2021–2022	FC Olimp-Dolgoprudny-2	13	(2)

International career^{‡}
2002	Russia U-17	2	(0)
2003–2004	Russia U-19	15	(5)
2004–2006	Russia U-21	14	(7)
2008	Russia	1	(0)
- * Club domestic league appearances and goals ‡ National team caps and goals as of 2

Nikita Aleksandrovich Bazhenov (Russian: Никита Александрович Баженов; born 1 February 1985) is a Russian former association footballer who played as a striker.

== Club career ==
He made one appearance in 2006–07 UEFA Champions League.

== International career ==
Bazhenov made his debut for Russia on 20 August 2008 in a friendly against the Netherlands.

== Career statistics ==
As of 14 September 2010

Club	Div	Season	League		Cup		Europe		Total	
Club	Div	Season	Apps	Goals	Apps	Goals	Apps	Goals	Apps	Goals
Saturn Ramenskoye	D1	2004	12	5	—		—		12	5
Spartak Moscow	D1	2004	11	1	—		—		11	1
Spartak Moscow	D1	2005	10	1	3	1	—		13	2
Spartak Moscow	D1	2006	11	3	5	0	4	0	20	3
Spartak Moscow	D1	2007	16	4	4	1	4	1	24	6
Spartak Moscow	D1	2008	22	6	2	0	7	2	31	8
Spartak Moscow	D1	2009	22	2	1	0	—		23	2
Spartak Moscow	D1	2010	10	0	1	1	1	1	12	3
Career total			124	22	16	3	16	4	146	29
