= Andrei Ivanov (footballer, born 1988) =

Russian footballer

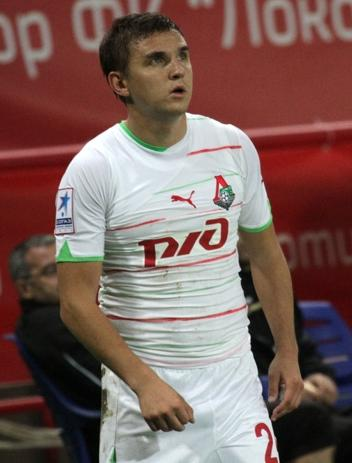
- Ivanov with Lokomotiv Moscow in 2011

Personal information
- Full name: Andrei Alekseyevich Ivanov
- Date of birth: 8 October 1988 (age 38)
- Place of birth: Moscow, Russia
- Height: 1.78 m (5 ft 10 in)
- Position: Left back

Youth career
- FC Spartak Moscow

Senior career*
Years	Team	Apps	(Gls)
2004–2010	FC Spartak Moscow	32	(0)
2009–2010	→ FC Tom Tomsk (loan)	32	(0)
2011–2013	FC Lokomotiv Moscow	2	(0)
2012	→ FC Tom Tomsk (loan)	2	(0)
2012–2013	→ FC Rostov (loan)	4	(0)
2014–2016	FC Sibir Novosibirsk	65	(2)
2016–2017	FC SKA-Khabarovsk	19	(0)
2017–2018	FC Torpedo Moscow	8	(0)

International career
2007	Russia U-19	8	(0)
2008–2010	Russia U-21	5	(0)
2011	Russia-2	1	(0)
- * Club domestic league appearances and goals

Andrei Alekseyevich Ivanov (Russian: Андрей Алексеевич Иванов; born 8 October 1988) is a Russian former footballer. He played as a left back.

== Club career ==
A product of the Spartak Moscow youth academy, Ivanov made his debut in the Russian Premier League on 26 December 2006 against Krylia Sovetov Samara. In 2009, he was loaned to Tom Tomsk until the end of the season. Next year, he went to Tomsk again on a one-year loan deal again, but was returned by the Moscow club in the mid-season to be in the starting lineup of the red-whites.

On 11 January 2011 Ivanov signed for Lokomotiv. A year later, after failing to make a fixture in the starting XI, he moved on loan to FC Tom Tomsk. The next season Ivanov spent also on loan, this time at FC Rostov. In the summer of 2013, he returned to Lokomotiv, but did not make his way into the first squad, featuring only for youth team. So, on 18 February 2014 his contract with Lokomotiv was terminated by mutual consent.

== Career statistics ==
As of 18 February 2014

Club	Div	Season	League		Cup		Europe		Total	
Club	Div	Season	Apps	Goals	Apps	Goals	Apps	Goals	Apps	Goals
(Russia) Spartak Moscow	D1	2006	1	0	—		—		1	0
(Russia) Spartak Moscow	D1	2007	7	0	1	0	3	0	11	0
(Russia) Spartak Moscow	D1	2008	12	0	1	0	2	0	15	0
(Russia) Spartak Moscow	D1	2010	12	0	0	0	2	0	14	0
(Russia) Spartak Moscow	Total		32	0	2	0	7	0	41	0
(Russia) Tom Tomsk	D1	2009	19	0	1	0	—		20	0
(Russia) Tom Tomsk	D1	2010	13	0	1	0	—		14	0
(Russia) Tom Tomsk	D1	2011-12	2	0	0	0	—		2	0
(Russia) Tom Tomsk	Total		34	0	2	0	0	0	36	0
(Russia) Lokomotiv Moscow	D1	2011-12	2	0	1	1	1	0	4	1
(Russia) Lokomotiv Moscow	Total		2	0	1	1	1	0	4	1
(Russia) Rostov	D1	2012-13	4	0	1	0	—		5	0
(Russia) Rostov	Total		4	0	1	0	0	0	5	0
Career total			72	0	6	1	8	0	86	1
