= Konstantin Sovetkin =

Russian footballer

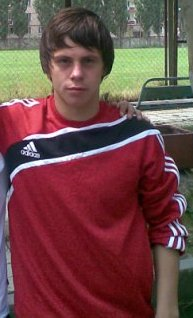

Personal information
- Full name: Konstantin Mikhailovich Sovetkin
- Date of birth: 19 February 1989 (age 37)
- Place of birth: Moscow, Soviet Union
- Height: 1.69 m (5 ft 7 in)
- Position: Midfielder

Youth career
- ?–2006: FC Spartak Moscow

Senior career*
Years	Team	Apps	(Gls)
2007–2012	Spartak Moscow	4	(0)
2009	→ Anzhi Makhachkala (loan)	2	(0)
2011–2012	→ Volga Ulyanovsk (loan)	24	(0)
2013	FC Metallurg-Oskol Stary Oskol	30	(2)
2014–2015	FC Spartak Kostroma	32	(0)
- * Club domestic league appearances and goals

Konstantin Mikhailovich Sovetkin (Russian: Константин Михайлович Советкин; born 19 February 1989) is a Russian former footballer.

== Career ==
A product of FC Spartak Moscow's youth system, Sovetkin made his Russian Premier League debut with Spartak's senior side in 2008. Spartak manager Stanislav Cherchesov had promoted Sovetkin to the senior side after the club suffered a 1–5 defeat to PFC CSKA Moscow.
