= Yehor Luhachov =

Ukrainian footballer

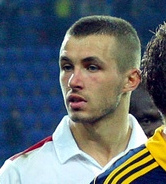

Personal information
- Full name: Yehor Yuriyovych Luhachov
- Date of birth: 24 December 1988 (age 37)
- Place of birth: Sumy, Ukrainian SSR
- Height: 1.78 m (5 ft 10 in)
- Position: Midfielder

Youth career
- 2001–2002: Sportiv School #15 Kyiv
- 2002–2003: FC Kyiv-Skhid Kyiv
- 2003: FC Dynamo Kyiv
- 2003–2004: FC Lokomotyv Kyiv

Senior career*
Years	Team	Apps	(Gls)
2005–2010	FC Spartak Moscow	1	(0)
2010	→ FC Arsenal Kyiv (loan)	3	(0)
2011–2012	FC Arsenal Kyiv	0	(0)
2013–2014	FC Poltava	16	(1)
2014	→ FC Hirnyk-Sport Komsomolsk (loan)	2	(0)
2014–2015	FC Hirnyk-Sport Komsomolsk	17	(0)
2015	FC Kolos Kovalivka	7	(0)

International career^{‡}
2003	Ukraine-15	4	(0)
2003–2004	Ukraine-16	10	(1)
2004–2005	Ukraine-17	14	(2)
2005–2006	Ukraine-18	9	(4)
2006–2007	Ukraine-19	6	(0)
2008–2011	Ukraine-21	5	(1)
- * Club domestic league appearances and goals as of 20 March 2015 ‡ National team caps and goals as of 20 March 2015

Yehor Luhachov (Ukrainian: Єгор Юрійович Лугачов; born 24 December 1988) is a retired Ukrainian footballer.

== Career ==
He played for FC Hirnyk-Sport Komsomolsk. He also played for the Ukraine national under-21 football team.

He made his debut for Spartak on 27 July 2008 when he came on as a last minute substitute in a game against FC Luch-Energiya Vladivostok.
