= Eldar Nizamutdinov =

Russian footballer

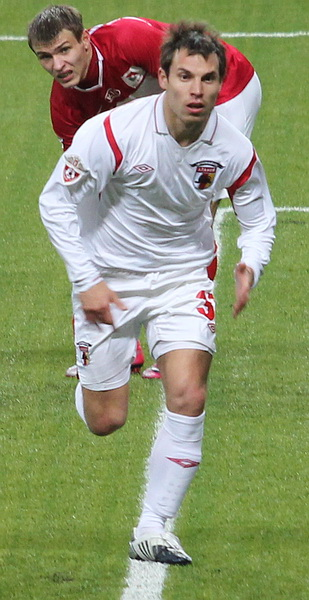
- Nizamutdinov in 2010

Personal information
- Full name: Eldar Felekhdinovich Nizamutdinov
- Date of birth: 31 May 1981 (age 45)
- Place of birth: Kostroma, Soviet Union
- Height: 1.71 m (5 ft 7 1/2 in)
- Position: Forward

Team information
- Current team: FC Volga Ulyanovsk (assistant coach)

Senior career*
| Years | Team | Apps | (Gls) |
| 2000–2001 | FC Spartak Kostroma | 12 | (0) |
| 2002 | FC Volochanin-89 Vyshny Volochyok | 36 | (17) |
| 2003 | FC Rotor Volgograd | 7 | (1) |
| 2003 | FC Ural Sverdlovsk Oblast | 14 | (4) |
| 2004 | FC Arsenal Tula | 35 | (1) |
| 2005 | FC Baltika Kaliningrad | 30 | (17) |
| 2006–2007 | FC Nosta Novotroitsk | 56 | (30) |
| 2008–2010 | FC Khimki | 45 | (10) |
| 2009 | → FC Spartak Moscow (loan) | 5 | (1) |
| 2010 | → FC Alania Vladikavkaz (loan) | 23 | (1) |
| 2011–2015 | FC Shinnik Yaroslavl | 125 | (30) |
| 2015–2016 | FC Yenisey Krasnoyarsk | 30 | (6) |
| 2016–2024 | FC Shinnik Yaroslavl | 211 | (48) |
| 2024 | FC Sokol Kazan | 7 | (0) |

Managerial career
- 2026–: FC Volga Ulyanovsk (assistant)
- * Club domestic league appearances and goals

Eldar Felekhdinovich Nizamutdinov (Russian: Эльдар Фэлэхдинович Низамутдинов; born 31 May 1981) is a Russian football coach and a former striker with Tatar roots. He is an assistant coach with FC Volga Ulyanovsk.

== Club career ==
He made his Russian Premier League debut for FC Rotor Volgograd on 6 April 2003 in a game against FC Alania Vladikavkaz.

In 2009, he was loaned to FC Spartak Moscow in the Russian Premier League.

== Honours ==
- Russian Second Division Zone Ural/Povolzhye top scorer: 2006 (14 goals).
