= 2010 FC Spartak Moscow season =

Spartak Moscow
2010 season
- Manager: Valeri Karpin
- Stadium: Luzhniki Stadium
- Premier League: 4th
- Russian Cup: Progressed to the Round of 16 in 2011–12 season
- UEFA Champions League: Progressed to the UEFA Europa League in the 2011–12 season
- Top goalscorer: League: Welliton (19); All: Welliton (19)

The 2010 FC Spartak Moscow season was the club's 19th season in the Russian Premier League season.

Spartak finished the season in 4th place, qualifying for the 2011–12 UEFA Europa League Play-off rounds. After entering the 2010–11 UEFA Champions League at the group stage, Spartak finished third behind Chelsea and Marseille, progressing to the Round of 32 of the 2010–11 UEFA Europa League due to take place during the 2011–12 season. In the 2010–11 Russian Cup, Spartak progressed to the Round of 16, also taking place during the 2011–12 season.

== Squad ==
As of match played 8 December 2010

No.	Name	Nationality	Position	Date of birth (age)	Signed from	Signed in	Contract ends	Apps.	Goals
Goalkeepers
28	Nikolai Zabolotny	(Russia)	GK	16 April 1990 (aged 20)	Youth Team	2010		0	0
30	Sergei Pesyakov	(Russia)	GK	28 May 1988 (aged 22)	Shinnik Yaroslavl	2009		6	0
36	Azamat Jioyev	(Russia)	GK	6 January 1991 (aged 19)	Youth Team	2008		0	0
42	Sergei Chernyshuk	(Russia)	GK	22 February 1992 (aged 18)	Youth Team	2010		0	0
56	Aleksandr Belenov	(Russia)	GK	13 September 1986 (aged 24)	Salyut Belgorod	2010	2014	1	0
81	Andriy Dykan	(Ukraine)	GK	16 July 1977 (aged 33)	Terek Grozny	2010		18	0
Defenders
3	Martin Stranzl	(Austria)	DF	16 June 1980 (aged 30)	VfB Stuttgart	2006		84	3
6	Renat Sabitov	(Russia)	DF	13 June 1985 (aged 25)	Saturn Ramenskoye	2007		62	0
16	Yevgeni Makeyev	(Russia)	DF	24 July 1989 (aged 21)	Youth Team	2008		51	3
17	Marek Suchý	(Czech Republic)	DF	29 March 1988 (aged 22)	Slavia Prague	2010		32	1
18	Andrei Ivanov	(Russia)	DF	8 October 1988 (aged 22)	Youth Team	2006		38	0
19	Nicolás Pareja	(Argentina)	DF	19 January 1984 (aged 26)	Espanyol	2010		16	0
34	Artyom Filatov	(Russia)	DF	4 February 1993 (aged 17)	Youth Team	2010		0	0
40	Konstantin Ryabov	(Russia)	DF	28 February 1992 (aged 18)	Youth Team	2010		0	0
43	Irakli Chezhiya	(Georgia (country))	DF	22 May 1992 (aged 18)	Youth Team	2008		0	0
47	Anton Ukolov	(Russia)	DF	9 March 1993 (aged 17)	Youth Team	2010		0	0
54	Ivan Khomukha	(Russia)	DF	14 July 1994 (aged 16)	Youth Team	2010		0	0
57	Nikolai Fadeyev	(Russia)	DF	9 May 1993 (aged 17)	Youth Team	2010		0	0
58	Aleksandr Putsko	(Russia)	DF	24 February 1993 (aged 17)	Youth Team	2010		0	0
65	Denis Kutin	(Russia)	DF	5 October 1993 (aged 17)	Youth Team	2010		0	0
77	Kirill Kombarov	(Russia)	DF	22 January 1987 (aged 23)	Dynamo Moscow	2010		1	0
99	Dmitri Kombarov	(Russia)	DF	22 January 1987 (aged 23)	Dynamo Moscow	2010		20	1
Midfielders
2	Cristian Maidana	(Argentina)	MF	24 January 1987 (aged 23)	Banfield	2008		44	3
5	Aleksandr Sheshukov	(Russia)	MF	15 April 1983 (aged 27)	FC Moscow	2010		34	1
7	Ibson	(Brazil)	MF	7 November 1983 (aged 27)	Porto	2009	2012	39	4
8	Nikola Drinčić	(Montenegro)	MF	7 September 1984 (aged 26)	Amkar Perm	2010	2013	7	0
10	Ivan Saenko	(Russia)	MF	17 October 1983 (aged 27)	1. FC Nürnberg	2008		39	2
12	Alex	(Brazil)	MF	25 March 1982 (aged 28)	Internacional	2009	2013	58	16
15	Sergei Parshivlyuk	(Russia)	MF	18 March 1989 (aged 21)	Youth Team	2007		76	1
20	Aleksandr Zotov	(Russia)	MF	27 August 1990 (aged 20)	Youth Team	2008		9	0
23	Igor Kireyev	(Russia)	MF	17 February 1992 (aged 18)	Youth Team	2008		1	0
26	Anton Khodyrev	(Russia)	MF	26 January 1992 (aged 18)	Youth Team	2009		4	0
27	Jano Ananidze	(Georgia (country))	MF	10 October 1992 (aged 18)	Youth Team	2009		35	5
31	Konstantin Sovetkin	(Russia)	MF	19 February 1989 (aged 21)	Youth Team	2008		6	0
32	Artemi Maleyev	(Russia)	MF	4 May 1991 (aged 19)	Youth Team	2009		0	0
33	Dmitri Malyaka	(Russia)	MF	15 January 1990 (aged 20)	Youth Team	2008		0	0
37	Dmitri Kayumov	(Russia)	MF	11 May 1992 (aged 18)	Youth Team	2009		0	0
39	Maksim Grigoryev	(Russia)	MF	6 July 1990 (aged 20)	Youth Team	2008		6	0
44	Maksim Terentyev	(Russia)	MF	26 February 1993 (aged 17)	Youth team	2010		0	0
48	Filip Ozobić	(Croatia)	MF	8 April 1991 (aged 19)	Youth Team	2009		2	0
51	Pavel Solomatin	(Russia)	MF	4 April 1993 (aged 17)	Youth team	2010		0	0
59	Alexandr Ilyin	(Russia)	MF	5 February 1993 (aged 17)	Youth team	2010		0	0
61	Vladimir Zubarev	(Russia)	MF	5 January 1993 (aged 17)	Youth team	2010		0	0
62	Pavel Sergeyev	(Russia)	MF	20 June 1993 (aged 17)	Youth team	2010		0	0
64	Aiden McGeady	(Republic of Ireland)	MF	4 April 1986 (aged 24)	Celtic	2010	2014	17	2
67	Dmitri Tumenko	(Russia)	MF	4 May 1989 (aged 21)	Youth Team	2008		0	0
Forwards
9	Ari	(Brazil)	FW	1 December 1985 (aged 25)	AZ	2010		28	9
11	Welliton	(Brazil)	FW	22 October 1986 (aged 24)	Goiás	2007		85	50
21	Nikita Bazhenov	(Russia)	FW	1 February 1985 (aged 25)	Saturn Ramenskoye	2004		131	22
31	Nikolai Ivannikov	(Russia)	FW	16 February 1992 (aged 18)	loan from Akademiya Tolyatti	2010		0	0
41	Vladimir Obukhov	(Russia)	FW	8 February 1992 (aged 18)	Youth Team	2008		0	0
49	Aleksandr Kozlov	(Russia)	FW	19 March 1993 (aged 17)	Youth team	2009		15	0
55	Dmitri Khlebosolov	(Belarus)	FW	7 October 1990 (aged 20)	Baranovichi	2009		0	0
89	Aleksandr Prudnikov	(Russia)	FW	26 February 1989 (aged 21)	Youth Team	2007		42	6
Away on loan
1	Soslan Dzhanayev	(Russia)	GK	13 March 1987 (aged 23)	KAMAZ	2008		41	0
13	Fyodor Kudryashov	(Russia)	DF	5 April 1987 (aged 23)	Sibiryak Bratsk	2005		28	0
14	Pavel Yakovlev	(Russia)	FW	7 April 1991 (aged 19)	Youth Team	2008		24	4
19	Artur Maloyan	(Russia)	MF	4 February 1989 (aged 21)	Youth Team	2007		9	1
22	Stipe Pletikosa	(Croatia)	GK	8 January 1979 (aged 31)	Shakhtar Donetsk	2007		79	0
24	Artem Dzyuba	(Russia)	FW	22 August 1988 (aged 22)	Youth Team	2006		60	10
29	Pavel Golyshev	(Russia)	MF	7 July 1987 (aged 23)	FC Moscow	2010		1	0
38	Yehor Luhachov	(Ukraine)	MF	24 December 1988 (aged 21)	Lokomotyv Kyiv	2006		2	0
58	Egor Filipenko	(Belarus)	DF	10 April 1988 (aged 22)	BATE Borisov	2008		22	1
	Ivan Komissarov	(Russia)	GK	28 May 1988 (aged 22)	Youth Team	2005		0	0
	Malik Fathi	(Germany)	DF	29 October 1983 (aged 27)	Hertha BSC	2008	2011	46	7
	Rafael Carioca	(Brazil)	MF	18 June 1989 (aged 21)	Grêmio	2009	2013	25	0
	Igor Gorbatenko	(Russia)	MF	13 February 1989 (aged 21)	Krylia Sovetov-SOK Dimitrovgrad	2008		2	0
	Aleksandr Pavlenko	(Russia)	MF	20 January 1985 (aged 25)	Lausanne-Sport	2001		149	16
	Vladislav Ryzhkov	(Russia)	MF	28 February 1990 (aged 20)	Youth Team	2008		15	2
Players that left Spartak Moscow during the season
4	Roman Shishkin	(Russia)	DF	27 January 1987 (aged 23)	Youth Team	2004		86	1
25	Martin Jiránek	(Czech Republic)	DF	25 May 1979 (aged 31)	Reggina	2004		164	4
35	Aleksandr Kozhevnikov	(Russia)	MF	18 April 1990 (aged 20)	Youth Team	2008		0	0
45	Konstantin Kadeyev	(Russia)	DF	17 January 1989 (aged 21)	Youth Team	2008		0	0
52	Oleg Dineyev	(Russia)	MF	30 October 1987 (aged 23)	Youth Team	2007		4	0
55	Quincy Owusu-Abeyie	(Netherlands)	FW	15 April 1986 (aged 24)	Arsenal	2006		39	3

=== On loan ===
Note: Flags indicate national team as defined under FIFA eligibility rules; some limited exceptions apply. Players may hold more than one non-FIFA nationality.

No.	Pos.	Nation	Player
1	GK	RUS	Soslan Dzhanayev (at Terek Grozny)
4	DF	GER	Malik Fathi (at Mainz 05)
13	DF	RUS	Fyodor Kudryashov (at Tom Tomsk)
14	FW	RUS	Pavel Yakovlev (at Krylia Sovetov)
19	MF	RUS	Artur Maloyan (at Ural Sverdlovsk Oblast)
22	GK	CRO	Stipe Pletikosa (at Tottenham Hotspur)
24	FW	RUS	Artem Dzyuba (at Tom Tomsk)

No.	Pos.	Nation	Player
29	MF	RUS	Pavel Golyshev (at Alania Vladikavkaz)
38	MF	UKR	Yehor Luhachov (at Arsenal Kyiv)
58	DF	BLR	Egor Filipenko (at Sibir Novosibirsk)
—	MF	BRA	Rafael Carioca (at Vasco da Gama)
—	MF	RUS	Igor Gorbatenko (at Ural Sverdlovsk Oblast)
—	MF	RUS	Aleksandr Pavlenko (at Rostov)

=== Left club during season ===
Note: Flags indicate national team as defined under FIFA eligibility rules; some limited exceptions apply. Players may hold more than one non-FIFA nationality.

No.	Pos.	Nation	Player
4	DF	RUS	Roman Shishkin (to Lokomotiv Moscow)
25	DF	CZE	Martin Jiránek (to Birmingham City)
35	DF	RUS	Aleksandr Kozhevnikov (to Dynamo Bryansk)

No.	Pos.	Nation	Player
45	DF	RUS	Konstantin Kadeyev (to Dynamo Bryansk)
52	MF	RUS	Oleg Dineyev (to Dynamo Bryansk)
55	FW	NED	Quincy Owusu-Abeyie (to Al Sadd)

== Transfers ==
=== In ===
Date	Position	Nationality	Name	From	Fee	Ref.
5 February 2010	FW	(Brazil)	Ari	AZ	Undisclosed	
13 January 2010	MF	(Montenegro)	Nikola Drinčić	Amkar Perm	Undisclosed	
27 February 2010	MF	(Russia)	Aleksandr Sheshukov	FC Moscow	Free	
16 March 2010	MF	(Russia)	Pavel Golyshev	FC Moscow	Free	
4 May 2010	DF	(Czech Republic)	Marek Suchý	Slavia Prague	Undisclosed	
30 July 2010	DF	(Argentina)	Nicolás Pareja	Espanyol	Undisclosed	
13 August 2010	MF	(Republic of Ireland)	Aiden McGeady	Celtic	Undisclosed	
14 August 2010	GK	(Russia)	Aleksandr Belenov	Salyut Belgorod	Undisclosed	
16 August 2010	DF	(Russia)	Dmitri Kombarov	Dynamo Moscow	Undisclosed	
16 August 2010	DF	(Russia)	Kirill Kombarov	Dynamo Moscow	Undisclosed	
27 August 2010	GK	(Ukraine)	Andriy Dykan	Terek Grozny	Undisclosed	

=== Loans in ===
Date	Position	Nationality	Name	From	Fee	Ref.
29 November 2009	DF	(Czech Republic)	Marek Suchý	Slavia Prague	4 May 2010	
Summer 2010	FW	(Russia)	Nikolai Ivannikov	Slavia Prague	End of Season	

=== Out ===
Date	Position	Nationality	Name	To	Fee	Ref.
31 March 2010	FW	(Netherlands)	Quincy Owusu-Abeyie	Al Sadd	Undisclosed	
6 July 2010	DF	(Russia)	Roman Shishkin	Lokomotiv Moscow	Undisclosed	
31 August 2010	DF	(Czech Republic)	Martin Jiránek	Birmingham City	Undisclosed	
Summer 2010	DF	(Russia)	Konstantin Kadeyev	Dynamo Bryansk	Undisclosed	
Summer 2010	DF	(Russia)	Aleksandr Kozhevnikov	Dynamo Bryansk	Undisclosed	
Summer 2010	MF	(Russia)	Oleg Dineyev	Dynamo Bryansk	Undisclosed	

=== Loans out ===
Date from	Position	Nationality	Name	To	Date to	Ref.
10 January 2010	MF	(Brazil)	Rafael Carioca	Vasco da Gama	End of Season	
29 January 2010	FW	(Netherlands)	Quincy Owusu-Abeyie	Portsmouth	31 March 2010	
1 February 2010	DF	(Germany)	Malik Fathi	Mainz 05	Summer 2010	
March 2010	MF	(Russia)	Aleksandr Pavlenko	Rostov	End of Season	
Winter 2010	GK	(Russia)	Ivan Komissarov	Tom Tomsk	Summer 2011	
Winter 2010	MF	(Russia)	Artur Maloyan	Ural Sverdlovsk Oblast	End of Season	
Winter 2010	MF	(Russia)	Igor Gorbatenko	Ural Sverdlovsk Oblast	End of Season	
Summer 2010	DF	(Belarus)	Egor Filipenko	Sibir Novosibirsk	End of Season	
Summer 2010	MF	(Ukraine)	Yehor Luhachov	Arsenal Kyiv	End of Season	
Summer 2010	FW	(Russia)	Artem Dzyuba	Tom Tomsk	End of Season	
Summer 2010	FW	(Russia)	Pavel Yakovlev	Krylia Sovetov	End of Season	
August 2010	DF	(Russia)	Fyodor Kudryashov	Tom Tomsk	End of Season	
28 August 2010	GK	(Russia)	Soslan Dzhanayev	Terek Grozny	31 December 2012	
31 August 2010	GK	(Croatia)	Stipe Pletikosa	Tottenham Hotspur	Summer 2011	
31 August 2010	DF	(Germany)	Malik Fathi	Mainz 05	Summer 2010	
20 August 2010	MF	(Russia)	Pavel Golyshev	Alania Vladikavkaz	End of Season	

=== Released ===
Date	Position	Nationality	Name	Joined	Date
31 December 2010	GK	(Russia)	Azamat Dzhioyev	Anzhi Makhachkala	
31 December 2010	DF	(Austria)	Martin Stranzl	Borussia Mönchengladbach	1 January 2011
31 December 2010	DF	(Russia)	Artyom Filatov		
31 December 2010	DF	(Russia)	Andrei Ivanov	Lokomotiv Moscow	
31 December 2010	DF	(Russia)	Konstantin Ryabov		
31 December 2010	DF	(Russia)	Renat Sabitov	Tom Tomsk	
31 December 2010	DF	(Russia)	Anton Ukolov		
31 December 2010	MF	(Montenegro)	Nikola Drinčić	Krasnodar	25 February 2011
31 December 2010	MF	(Russia)	Pavel Golyshev	Tom Tomsk	
31 December 2010	MF	(Russia)	Maksim Grigoryev	MITOS Novocherkassk	
31 December 2010	MF	(Russia)	Aleksandr Ilyin	Dynamo Moscow	
31 December 2010	MF	(Russia)	Dmitri Malyaka	MITOS Novocherkassk	
31 December 2010	MF	(Russia)	Ivan Saenko	Retired	
31 December 2010	MF	(Russia)	Pavel Solomatin	Karelia Petrozavodsk	
31 December 2010	MF	(Russia)	Maksim Terentyev	Mordovia Saransk	
31 December 2010	MF	(Russia)	Dmitri Tumenko	Neftekhimik Nizhnekamsk	
31 December 2010	MF	(Ukraine)	Yehor Luhachov	Arsenal Kyiv	
31 December 2010	FW	(Russia)	Nikita Bazhenov	Tom Tomsk	

== Competitions ==
=== Premier League ===
==== Results by round ====
Round	1	2	3	4	5	6	7	8	9	10	11	12	13	14	15	16	17	18	19	20	21	22	23	24	25	26	27	28	29	30
Ground	H	A	H	A	H	A	H	A	H	A	H	A	H	A	H	H	A	H	A	H	A	H	A	H	A	H	A	H	A	A
Result	L	D	W	D	W	D	D	W	W	L	W	L	L	D	L	W	W	W	L	W	W	D	W	W	D	W	D	D	L	D

Updated to match(es) played on 28 November 2010. Source: See Results
A = Away; H = Home; W = Win; D = Draw; L = Loss

==== Results ====
14 March 2010 1	Spartak Moscow	0 – 1	Dynamo Moscow	Moscow
19:00 MSK (UTC+3)	Sheshukov (yellow card) 27' (yellow-red card) 85'; Welliton (yellow card) 37'; Kudryashov (yellow card) 74'; Jiránek (yellow card) 86'	Report	Semshov (yellow card) 55' (goal) 72'; Fernández (yellow card) 74'	Stadium: Luzhniki Stadium; Attendance: 43,000; Referee: Sergei Karasev

21 March 2010 2	Zenit St.Petersburg	1 – 1	Spartak Moscow	Saint Petersburg
14:00 MSK (UTC+3)	Shirokov (yellow card) 37'; Kerzhakov (yellow card) 82'; Lombaerts 88'	Report	Welliton 12'; Makeev (yellow card) 56'; Parshivlyuk (yellow card) 70'; Suchý (yellow card) 80'	Stadium: Petrovsky Stadium; Attendance: 19,450; Referee: Stanislav Sukhina

28 March 2010 3	Spartak Moscow	2 – 1	Lokomotiv Moscow	Moscow
14:00 MSK (DST) (UTC+4)	Suchý (yellow card) 8' (goal) 11'; Ari 18'; Ibson (yellow card) 21'; Makeyev (yellow card) 83'; Bazhenov (yellow card) 89'	Report	Asatiani (yellow card) 12'; Aliyev 28'; Charles (yellow card) 29'; Sychev (yellow card) 39'	Stadium: Olympic Stadium; Attendance: 40,000; Referee: Maksim Layushkin

4 April 2010 4	Tom Tomsk	2 – 2	Spartak Moscow	Tomsk
11:30 MSK (DST) (UTC+4)	Kornilenko 8' (pen.) (yellow card) 23'; Klimov 39' (yellow card) 87'; Covalciuc (yellow card) 83'; Skoblyakov (yellow card) 86'	Report	Sheshukov (yellow card) 9'; Welliton (yellow card) 21' (goal) 29'; Ibson 47'; Ari (yellow card) 62'; Alex (yellow card) 90'	Stadium: Trud Stadium; Attendance: 14,500; Referee: Vladislav Bezborodov

10 April 2010 5	Spartak Moscow	2 – 1	Terek Grozny	Moscow
16:15 MSK (DST) (UTC+4)	Ferreira 58' (o.g.); Welliton 88'	Report	Yatchenko (yellow card) 9'; Asildarov 15'; Amelyanchuk (yellow card) 35'; Kobenko (yellow card) 42'	Stadium: Lokomotiv Stadium; Attendance: 17,100; Referee: Vladimir Pettay

18 April 2010 6	Saturn Ramenskoye	0 – 0	Spartak Moscow	Ramenskoye
16:15 MSK (DST) (UTC+4)	Nakhushev (yellow card) 90+'	Report		Stadium: Saturn Stadium; Attendance: 14,200; Referee: Aleksandr Kolobaev

25 April 2010 7	Spartak Moscow	0 – 0	Spartak Nalchik	Moscow
14:00 MSK (DST) (UTC+4)	Saenko (yellow card) 62'; Alex (yellow card) 63' (yellow-red card) 90'	Report	Kontsedalov (red card) 25'; Gogua (yellow card) 40'; Kisenkov (yellow card) 88'	Stadium: Luzhniki Stadium; Attendance: 18,000; Referee: Nikolai Ivanov

2 May 2010 8	Amkar Perm	0 – 2	Spartak Moscow	Perm
18:30 MSK (DST) (UTC+4)	Grishin (yellow card) 31'; Peev (yellow card) 73'	Report	Ari 39'; Parshivlyuk (yellow card) 44'; Welliton 50'	Stadium: Zvezda Stadium; Attendance: 13,700; Referee: Igor Egorov

6 May 2010 9	Spartak Moscow	3 – 0	Anzhi Makhachkala	Moscow
21:00 MSK (DST) (UTC+4)	Welliton 42', 67'; Alex 86'	Report		Stadium: Lokomotiv Stadium; Attendance: 19,000; Referee: Aleksandr Gvardis

10 May 2010 10	Alania Vladikavkaz	5 – 2	Spartak Moscow	Vladikavkaz
14:00 MSK (DST) (UTC+4)	Marenich 5'; Gabulov 9', 69'; Kirillov (yellow card) 25'; Florescu (yellow card) 51'; Khubulov (yellow card) 78' (goal) 88'; Ivanov (yellow card) 83'; Oganyan 90'; Gnanou (yellow card) 90'	Report	Welliton 7' (penalty missed) 90'; Makeyev (yellow card) 13'; Florescu 30' (o.g.); Kozlov (yellow card) 52'	Stadium: Republican Spartak Stadium; Attendance: 20,000; Referee: Vladimir Pettay

21 July 2010 11	Spartak Moscow	5 – 3	Sibir Novosibirsk	Moscow
21:00 MSK (DST) (UTC+4)	Ari 5', 52'; Ananidze 23', 67'; Ibson (yellow card) 44'; Jiránek 76'; Zotov (yellow card) 90'	Report	Molosh (yellow card) 62'; Antipenko 70'; Čížek 73'; Astafyev 84'	Stadium: Luzhniki Stadium; Attendance: 11,000; Referee: Vyachelsav Popov

9 July 2010 12	Rostov	1 – 0	Spartak Moscow	Rostov-on-Don
21:00 MSK (DST) (UTC+4)	Kulchy 13'; Gațcan (yellow card) 63' (yellow-red card) 81'; Anđelković (yellow card) 87'; Amelchenko (yellow card) 90'	Report	Kudryashov (yellow card) 5'; Suchý (yellow card) 45'; Sheshukov (yellow card) 89'	Stadium: Olimp-2; Attendance: 14,500; Referee: Igor Egorov

17 July 2010 13	Spartak Moscow	0 – 1	Rubin Kazan	Moscow
21:00 MSK (DST) (UTC+4)	Sheshukov (yellow card) 54'; Suchý (yellow card) 84'; Kudryashov (yellow card) 86' (yellow-red card) 90'	Report	Noboa 3' (yellow card) 30'; Karadeniz (yellow card) 23'; Navas (yellow card) 53'	Stadium: Luzhniki Stadium; Attendance: 16,000; Referee: Stanislav Sukhina

25 July 2010 14	Krylia Sovetov	0 – 0	Spartak Moscow	Samara
20:30 MSK (DST) (UTC+4)	Ajinjal (yellow card) 63'; Budylin (yellow card) 68'	Report	Sheshukov (yellow card) 23' (yellow-red card) 90+'	Stadium: Metallurg Stadium; Attendance: 16,500; Referee: Nikolai Ivanov

1 August 2010 15	Spartak Moscow	1 – 2	CSKA Moscow	Moscow
19:00 MSK (DST) (UTC+4)	Suchý (yellow card) 13'; Zotov (yellow card) 44'; V.Berezutski 71' (o.g.)	Report	Mamayev (yellow card) 43'; Shchennikov (yellow card) 75'; Ignashevich 82'; Vágner Love 90'	Stadium: Luzhniki Stadium; Attendance: 55,000; Referee: Aleksandr Kolobaev

27 October 2010 16	Spartak Moscow	1 – 0	Zenit St.Petersburg	Moscow
20:30 MSK (UTC+3)	Makeev (yellow card) 40'; Welliton (yellow card) 62'; Pareja (yellow card) 66'; Suchý (yellow card) 69'; D. Kombarov 88' (pen.)	Report	Danny (yellow card) 36'; Luković (yellow card) 78'; Denisov (yellow card) 90'	Stadium: Luzhniki Stadium; Attendance: 27,100; Referee: Igor Egorov

15 August 2010 17	Lokomotiv Moscow	2 – 3	Spartak Moscow	Moscow
21:20 MSK (DST) (UTC+4)	Asatiani (yellow card) 12'; Aliyev 20'; Maicon (yellow card) 59'; Sychev 87'; Rodolfo (yellow card) 90'	Report	Welliton 18', 31', 65'; Alex (yellow card) 74'; Parshivlyuk (yellow card) 84'	Stadium: Lokomotiv Stadium; Attendance: 23,123; Referee: Aleksei Nikolaev

21 August 2010 18	Spartak Moscow	4 – 2	Tom Tomsk	Moscow
16:00 MSK (DST) (UTC+4)	Welliton (yellow card) 29' (goal) 52', 55', 58'; Ivanov (yellow card) 68'; Bazhenov (yellow card) 81'; Alex 87'; Pesyakov (red card) 90'	Report	Klimov (yellow card) 20'; Jokić (yellow card) 34'; Khatazhyonkov (yellow card) 34'; Kim (yellow card) 55'; Kornilenko 66', 90' (pen.)	Stadium: Luzhniki Stadium; Attendance: 14,000; Referee: Eduard Malyi

28 August 2010 19	Terek Grozny	2 – 0	Spartak Moscow	Grozny
16:00 MSK (DST) (UTC+4)	Asildarov 49'; Utsiyev 83'; Essame (yellow card) 90'	Report		Stadium: Sultan Bilimkhanov Stadium; Attendance: 9,500; Referee: Vladislav Bezborodov

11 September 2010 20	Spartak Moscow	2 – 1	Saturn Ramenskoye	Moscow
17:30 MSK (DST) (UTC+4)	Welliton 7', 74' (yellow card) 53'; Parshivlyuk (yellow card) 83'	Report	Kirichenko 21'; Angbwa (yellow card) 41'; Evseev (yellow card) 45'; Parfenov (yellow card) 53'; Mahmudov (yellow card) 73'	Stadium: Luzhniki Stadium; Attendance: 13,500; Referee: Vyacheslav Kharlamov

19 September 2010 21	Spartak Nalchik	0 – 2	Spartak Moscow	Nalchik
MSK (DST) (UTC+4)	Golić (yellow card) 50'; Leandro (penalty missed) 54'	Report	Ari 20', 78'; Sheshukov (yellow card) 28'; McGeady (yellow card) 37'; Suchý (yellow card) 83'	Stadium: Spartak Stadium; Attendance: 12,000; Referee: Stanislav Sukhina

25 September 2010 22	Spartak Moscow	2 – 2	Amkar Perm	Moscow
MSK (DST) (UTC+4)	Welliton 37'; Suchý (yellow card) 68'; McGeady 77'	Report	Novaković 23'; Cherenchikov 54'; Usminskiy (yellow card) 90+'	Stadium: Luzhniki Stadium; Attendance: 12,700; Referee: Mikhail Vilkov

3 October 2010 23	Anzhi Makhachkala	0 – 1	Spartak Moscow	Makhachkala
16:15 MSK (DST) (UTC+4)		Report	Sheshukov 22'	Stadium: Dynamo Stadium; Attendance: 11,000; Referee: Igor Egorov

16 October 2010 24	Spartak Moscow	3 – 0	Alania Vladikavkaz	Moscow
MSK (DST) (UTC+4)	Ari 24'; Alex 39'; Ivanov 53' (o.g.); Pareja (yellow card) 84'; Maidana (yellow card) 90'	Report	Bulgaru (yellow card) 38'; Gnanou (yellow card) 76'	Stadium: Luzhniki Stadium; Attendance: 10,500; Referee: Stanislav Sukhina

23 October 2010 25	Sibir Novosibirsk	0 – 0	Spartak Moscow	Novosibirsk
13:45 MSK (DST) (UTC+4)	Šumulikoski (yellow card) 8'; Belyayev (yellow card) 90'	Report	McGeady (yellow card) 36'; Sheshukov (yellow card) 41'; Ivanov (yellow card) 71'; Zotov (yellow card) 85'	Stadium: Spartak Stadium; Attendance: 12,000; Referee: Vitali Meshkov

30 October 2010 26	Spartak Moscow	2 – 1	Rostov	Moscow
19:30 MSK (UTC+3)	Khodyrev (yellow card) 9'; Welliton 39'; Sheshukov (yellow card) 79'; McGeady 90' (pen.)	Report	Khagush 24'; Gațcan (yellow card) 31'; Ghionea (yellow card) 42'; Okoronkwo (yellow card) 90'	Stadium: Luzhniki Stadium; Attendance: 10,900; Referee: Aleksandr Gvardis

8 November 2010 27	Rubin Kazan	1 – 1	Spartak Moscow	Kazan
20:00 MSK (UTC+3)	Kaleshin (yellow card) 54'; Kornilenko (yellow card) 75' (goal) 90+4'	Report	Welliton 41'; Sheshukov (yellow card) 45'	Stadium: Central Stadium; Attendance: 20,450; Referee: Vladislav Bezborodov

14 November 2010 28	Spartak Moscow	0 – 0	Krylia Sovetov	Moscow
19:00 MSK (UTC+3)	Pareja (yellow card) 89'; McGeady (yellow card) 90+'	Report	Ivanov (yellow card) 27'; Lobos (yellow card) 88'; Leilton (yellow card) 89'	Stadium: Luzhniki Stadium; Attendance: 12,554; Referee: Vyachelsav Popov

20 November 2010 29	CSKA Moscow	3 – 1	Spartak Moscow	Moscow
14:00 MSK (UTC+3)	Doumbia (yellow card) 28' (goal) 66'; Šemberas (yellow card) 37' (yellow-red card) 51'; Honda 57'; Vágner Love 90' (yellow card) 90'; Ignashevich (yellow card) 90'	Report	Ivanov (yellow card) 9'; Sheshukov (yellow card) 15'; Ibson 17' (yellow card) 77'	Stadium: Arena Khimki; Attendance: 14,800; Referee: Aleksei Nikolaev

28 November 2010 30	Dynamo Moscow	1 – 1	Spartak Moscow	Moscow
14:00 MSK (UTC+3)	Khokhlov 38'; Granat (yellow card) 50'; Ropotan (red card) 68'	Report	Sheshukov (yellow card) 23'; Welliton 28'; McGeady (red card) 78'	Stadium: Arena Khimki; Attendance: 12,378; Referee: Aleksandr Kolobaev

==== League table ====
Pos	Team	Pld	W	D	L	GF	GA	GD	Pts	Qualification or relegation
2	CSKA Moscow	30	18	8	4	51	22	+29	62	Qualification to Champions League group stage
3	Rubin Kazan	30	15	13	2	37	16	+21	58	Qualification to Champions League third qualifying round
4	Spartak Moscow	30	13	10	7	43	33	+10	49	Qualification to Europa League play-off round
5	Lokomotiv Moscow	30	13	9	8	34	29	+5	48	Qualification to Europa League play-off round
6	Spartak Nalchik	30	12	8	10	40	37	+3	44	

Source: RFPL (in Russian)
Rules for classification: 1st points; 2nd matches won; 3rd head-to-head (points, matches won, goal difference, goals scored, away goals scored); 4th goal difference; 5th goals scored; 6th away goals scored; 7th position in previous season or decision game

=== Russian Cup ===
13 July 2010 Round of 32	Metallurg Lipetsk	0 – 1	Spartak Moscow	Lipetsk
19:00 MSK (DST) (UTC+4)	Khripunkov (yellow card) 55'	Report	Alex 54' (pen.); Zotov (yellow card) 76'	Stadium: Metallurg Stadium; Attendance: 14,000; Referee: Vitali Meshkov

The Round of 16 took place during the 2011–12 season.

=== UEFA Champions League ===
==== Group stage ====
Pos	Team	Pld	W	D	L	GF	GA	GD	Pts	Qualification
1	(England) Chelsea	6	5	0	1	14	4	+10	15	Advance to knockout phase
2	(France) Marseille	6	4	0	2	12	3	+9	12	Advance to knockout phase
3	(Russia) Spartak Moscow	6	3	0	3	7	10	−3	9	Transfer to Europa League
4	(Slovakia) Žilina	6	0	0	6	3	19	−16	0	

15 September 2010 1	Marseille (France)	0 – 1	(Russia) Spartak Moscow	Marseille, France
22:45 MSK (DST) (UTC+4)	Brandão (yellow card) 61'	Report	Alex (yellow card) 55'; Azpilicueta 81' (o.g.)	Stadium: Stade Vélodrome; Attendance: 45,729; Referee: Florian Meyer (Germany)

28 September 2010 2	Spartak Moscow (Russia)	3 – 0	(Slovakia) Žilina	Moscow, Russia
20:30 MSK (DST) (UTC+4)	Ari 34', 61'; Ibson 89'	Report	Guldan (yellow card) 17'; Pečalka (yellow card) 41'	Stadium: Luzhniki Stadium; Attendance: 37,000; Referee: Martin Hansson (Sweden)

19 October 2010 3	Spartak Moscow (Russia)	0 – 2	(England) Chelsea	Moscow, Russia
20:30 MSK (DST) (UTC+4)	Suchý (yellow card) 56'	Report	Zhirkov 23' (yellow card) 88'; Anelka 43'	Stadium: Luzhniki Stadium; Attendance: 70,012; Referee: Carlos Velasco Carballo (Spain)

3 November 2010 4	Chelsea (England)	4 – 1	(Russia) Spartak Moscow	London, England
22:45 MSK (UTC+3)	Mikel (yellow card) 38'; Anelka 49'; Drogba 62' (pen.); Ivanović 66', 90+2'	Report	D.Kombarov (yellow card) 43'; Ivanov (yellow card) 66'; Bazhenov 86'	Stadium: Stamford Bridge; Attendance: 40,477; Referee: Cüneyt Çakır (Turkey)

23 November 2010 5	Spartak Moscow (Russia)	0 – 3	(France) Marseille	Moscow, Russia
20:30 MSK (UTC+3)	Sheshukov (yellow card) 31'; Welliton (red card) 64'; Ibson (yellow card) 67'	Report	Mbia (yellow card) 13'; Valbuena 18'; Rémy 54'; Brandão 68'	Stadium: Luzhniki Stadium; Attendance: 43,217; Referee: Wolfgang Stark (Germany)

8 December 2010 6	Žilina (Slovakia)	1 – 2	(Russia) Spartak Moscow	Žilina, Slovakia
22:45 MSK (UTC+3)	Guldan (yellow card) 25'; Bello (yellow card) 45'; Poliaček (yellow card) 45'; Majtán 48'; Piaček (yellow card) 49'; Pečalka (yellow card) 75'	Report	Alex 54'; Ibson 61' (red card) 77'; K.Kombarov (yellow card) 66'	Stadium: Štadión pod Dubňom; Attendance: 7,208; Referee: Kevin Blom (Netherlands)

== Squad statistics ==
As of match played 8 December 2010

=== Appearances and goals ===
No.	Pos	Nat	Player	Total		Premier League		2010-11 Russian Cup		UEFA Champions League	
No.	Pos	Nat	Player	Apps	Goals	Apps	Goals	Apps	Goals	Apps	Goals
2	MF	(Argentina) ARG	Cristian Maidana	12	0	4+6	0	1	0	0+1	0
3	DF	(Austria) AUT	Martin Stranzl	19	0	14+1	0	1	0	2+1	0
5	MF	(Russia) RUS	Aleksandr Sheshukov	29	1	22+1	1	0	0	6	0
6	DF	(Russia) RUS	Renat Sabitov	21	0	11+7	0	1	0	0+2	0
7	MF	(Brazil) BRA	Ibson	34	4	27+1	2	0	0	5+1	2
8	MF	(Montenegro) MNE	Nikola Drinčić	7	0	2+2	0	0	0	0+3	0
9	FW	(Brazil) BRA	Ari	28	9	18+6	7	0	0	3+1	2
10	MF	(Russia) RUS	Ivan Saenko	10	0	8+2	0	0	0	0	0
11	FW	(Brazil) BRA	Welliton	31	19	24+1	19	1	0	5	0
12	MF	(Brazil) BRA	Alex	27	4	21+1	3	1	0	4	1
15	MF	(Russia) RUS	Sergei Parshivlyuk	25	0	21	0	1	0	3	0
16	DF	(Russia) RUS	Yevgeni Makeyev	29	0	19+3	0	1	0	6	0
17	DF	(Czech Republic) CZE	Marek Suchý	32	1	25	1	1	0	6	0
18	DF	(Russia) RUS	Andrei Ivanov	14	0	11+1	0	0	0	1+1	0
19	DF	(Argentina) ARG	Nicolás Pareja	16	0	10+1	0	0	0	5	0
20	MF	(Russia) RUS	Aleksandr Zotov	5	0	2+2	0	1	0	0	0
21	FW	(Russia) RUS	Nikita Bazhenov	14	1	4+8	0	1	0	0+1	1
23	MF	(Russia) RUS	Igor Kireyev	1	0	0+1	0	0	0	0	0
26	MF	(Russia) RUS	Anton Khodyrev	4	0	2+1	0	0+1	0	0	0
27	MF	(Georgia (country)) GEO	Jano Ananidze	25	2	12+11	2	0	0	0+2	0
30	GK	(Russia) RUS	Sergei Pesyakov	6	0	5	0	1	0	0	0
48	MF	(Croatia) CRO	Filip Ozobić	2	0	0+1	0	0	0	0+1	0
49	FW	(Russia) RUS	Aleksandr Kozlov	15	0	0+12	0	0+1	0	1+1	0
56	GK	(Russia) RUS	Aleksandr Belenov	1	0	1	0	0	0	0	0
64	MF	(Republic of Ireland) IRL	Aiden McGeady	17	2	11	2	0	0	6	0
81	GK	(Ukraine) UKR	Andriy Dykan	18	0	12	0	0	0	6	0
77	DF	(Russia) RUS	Kirill Kombarov	1	0	0	0	0	0	1	0
99	DF	(Russia) RUS	Dmitri Kombarov	20	1	13+1	1	0	0	6	0
Players away from the club on loan:
1	GK	(Russia) RUS	Soslan Dzhanayev	12	0	12	0	0	0	0	0
13	DF	(Russia) RUS	Fyodor Kudryashov	9	0	8+1	0	0	0	0	0
14	FW	(Russia) RUS	Pavel Yakovlev	7	0	1+5	0	0+1	0	0	0
24	FW	(Russia) RUS	Artem Dzyuba	2	0	0+2	0	0	0	0	0
29	MF	(Russia) RUS	Pavel Golyshev	1	0	0+1	0	0	0	0	0
Players who appeared for Spartak Moscow but left during the season:
25	DF	(Czech Republic) CZE	Martin Jiránek	10	1	10	1	0	0	0	0

=== Goal scorers ===
Place	Position	Nation	Number	Name	Premier League	2010-11 Russian Cup	UEFA Champions League	Total
1	FW	(Brazil)	11	Welliton	19	0	0	19
2	FW	(Brazil)	9	Ari	7	0	2	9
3	MF	(Brazil)	12	Alex	3	1	1	5
3				Own goal	4	0	1	5
5	MF	(Brazil)	7	Ibson	2	0	2	4
6	MF	(Georgia (country))	27	Jano Ananidze	2	0	0	2
6	MF	(Republic of Ireland)	64	Aiden McGeady	2	0	0	2
8	DF	(Czech Republic)	17	Marek Suchý	1	0	0	1
8	DF	(Czech Republic)	25	Martin Jiránek	1	0	0	1
8	DF	(Russia)	99	Dmitri Kombarov	1	0	0	1
8	MF	(Russia)	5	Aleksandr Sheshukov	1	0	0	1
8	FW	(Russia)	21	Nikita Bazhenov	0	0	1	1
TOTALS					43	1	7	51

=== Clean sheets ===
Place	Position	Nation	Number	Name	Premier League	2010-11 Russian Cup	UEFA Champions League	Total
1	GK	(Ukraine)	81	Andriy Dykan	6	0	2	8
2	GK	(Russia)	1	Soslan Dzhanayev	4	0	0	4
3	GK	(Russia)	30	Sergei Pesyakov	1	1	0	2
TOTALS					11	1	0	3

=== Disciplinary record ===
Number	Nation	Position	Name	Premier League		2010-11 Russian Cup		UEFA Champions League		Total	
Number	Nation	Position	Name	Booked	Sent off (straight red)	Booked	Sent off (straight red)	Booked	Sent off (straight red)	Booked	Sent off (straight red)
2	(Argentina)	MF	Cristian Maidana	1	0	0	0	0	0	1	0
5	(Russia)	MF	Aleksandr Sheshukov	13	2	0	0	1	0	14	2
7	(Brazil)	MF	Ibson	3	0	0	0	1	1	4	1
9	(Brazil)	FW	Ari	1	0	0	0	0	0	1	0
10	(Russia)	MF	Ivan Saenko	1	0	0	0	0	0	1	0
11	(Brazil)	FW	Welliton	5	0	0	0	0	1	5	1
12	(Brazil)	MF	Alex	4	1	0	0	1	0	5	1
15	(Russia)	MF	Sergei Parshivlyuk	4	0	0	0	0	0	4	0
16	(Russia)	DF	Yevgeni Makeyev	4	0	0	0	0	0	4	0
17	(Czech Republic)	DF	Marek Suchý	8	0	0	0	1	0	9	0
18	(Russia)	DF	Andrei Ivanov	3	0	0	0	1	0	4	0
19	(Argentina)	DF	Nicolás Pareja	3	0	0	0	0	0	3	0
20	(Russia)	MF	Aleksandr Zotov	3	0	1	0	0	0	4	0
21	(Russia)	FW	Nikita Bazhenov	2	0	0	0	0	0	2	0
26	(Russia)	MF	Anton Khodyrev	1	0	0	0	0	0	1	0
30	(Russia)	GK	Sergei Pesyakov	0	1	0	0	0	0	0	1
49	(Russia)	FW	Aleksandr Kozlov	1	0	0	0	0	0	1	0
64	(Republic of Ireland)	MF	Aiden McGeady	3	1	0	0	0	0	3	1
77	(Russia)	DF	Kirill Kombarov	0	0	0	0	1	0	1	0
99	(Russia)	DF	Dmitri Kombarov	0	0	0	0	1	0	1	0
Players away on loan:
13	(Russia)	DF	Fyodor Kudryashov	4	1	0	0	0	0	4	1
Players who left Spartak Moscow season during the season:
25	(Czech Republic)	DF	Martin Jiránek	1	0	0	0	0	0	1	0
Total				65	6	1	0	7	2	73	8
