= List of Russian football transfers summer 2010 =

This is a list of Russian football transfers in the summer transfer window 2010 by club. Only transfers of the 2010 Russian Premier League are included.

== Russian Premier League 2010 ==
=== Alania Vladikavkaz ===
In: Note: Flags indicate national team as defined under FIFA eligibility rules; some limited exceptions apply. Players may hold more than one non-FIFA nationality.

No.	Pos.	Nation	Player
5	MF	ROU	Gheorghe Florescu (from (Denmark) Midtjylland, previously on loan)
13	DF	MDA	Simeon Bulgaru (from (Denmark) Viborg)
21	MF	RUS	Inal Pukhayev (from Amkar Perm)
30	FW	NGR	Baba Collins (on loan from (Denmark) Midtjylland)
70	MF	RUS	Pavel Golyshev (on loan from Spartak Moscow)
75	MF	UZB	Marat Bikmaev (from Spartak Nalchik)
90	FW	RUS	Aleksandr Tikhonovetsky (on loan from Nizhny Novgorod)
91	MF	RUS	Aleksandr Dzalayev (from Dnepr Smolensk)
92	GK	RUS	Alan Khaliyev
95	FW	LBR	Dioh Williams (on loan from (Denmark) AGF)
97	FW	RUS	Atsamaz Burayev (from Avtodor Vladikavkaz)
99	FW	RUS	Aleksandr Alkhazov (from Krylia Sovetov Samara)

Out: Note: Flags indicate national team as defined under FIFA eligibility rules; some limited exceptions apply. Players may hold more than one non-FIFA nationality.

No.	Pos.	Nation	Player
6	MF	NGR	Sani Kaita (end of loan from (France) AS Monaco)
10	MF	BIH	Zajko Zeba (to (Bosnia and Herzegovina) Željezničar Sarajevo)
19	MF	RUS	Vitali Chochiyev (to Salyut Belgorod)
27	MF	RUS	Georgi Bazayev
32	DF	ANG	Francisco Zuela (end of loan from Kuban Krasnodar)
48	MF	RUS	Oleg Tigiev
55	FW	RUS	Alan Alborov
79	FW	UKR	Serhiy Kuznetsov (end of loan from (Ukraine) Karpaty Lviv)

=== Amkar Perm ===
In: Note: Flags indicate national team as defined under FIFA eligibility rules; some limited exceptions apply. Players may hold more than one non-FIFA nationality.

No.	Pos.	Nation	Player
9	FW	JPN	Seiichiro Maki (from (Japan) JEF Chiba)
39	FW	UKR	Ilya Mikhalyov (from (Ukraine) Shakhtar Donetsk)
45	MF	RUS	Aleksei Skvortsov
70	MF	RUS	Nika Piliyev (on loan from CSKA Moscow)
71	MF	RUS	Gor Oganesyan (from Moscow)
73	MF	RUS	Brian Idowu
83	MF	SLO	Luka Žinko (from (Cyprus) APOP Kinyras Peyias)
86	MF	RUS	Artyom Vasilyev
90	MF	RUS	Maksim Magurov
93	MF	RUS	Yevgeni Smorodin
99	FW	MKD	Stevica Ristić (from (Uzbekistan) Bunyodkor)

Out: Note: Flags indicate national team as defined under FIFA eligibility rules; some limited exceptions apply. Players may hold more than one non-FIFA nationality.

No.	Pos.	Nation	Player
6	MF	UKR	Denys Dedechko (to Krasnodar)
16	GK	RUS	Yevgeni Serikov (to Istra)
22	FW	RUS	Azamat Kurachinov
25	FW	BRA	Jean Carlos (on loan to (Brazil) Ceará)
27	DF	RUS	Mikhail Makagonov (on loan to Dynamo Saint Petersburg)
30	FW	RUS	Timofei Berdyshev (to Neftekhimik Nizhnekamsk)
31	FW	BRA	Vito (released)
32	MF	RUS	Vadim Gagloyev (on loan to Tyumen)
41	GK	RUS	Maksim Shumailov (on loan to Tyumen)
51	MF	RUS	Inal Pukhayev (to Alania Vladikavkaz)
63	FW	RUS	Damir Sadikov (on loan to Tyumen)
87	MF	RUS	Roman Chernyshev (to Sportakademklub Moscow)
—	MF	BRA	William (to Dynamo Bryansk, previously on loan at Shinnik Yaroslavl)

=== Anzhi Makhachkala ===
In: Note: Flags indicate national team as defined under FIFA eligibility rules; some limited exceptions apply. Players may hold more than one non-FIFA nationality.

No.	Pos.	Nation	Player
3	DF	LAT	Oskars Kļava (from (Latvia) Liepājas Metalurgs)
10	FW	RUS	Ilya Kukharchuk (from Rubin Kazan)
16	FW	RUS	Dmitri Vasilyev
22	FW	UKR	Miroslav Slavov (from (France) Bordeaux)
23	MF	RUS	Shamil Burziyev (from Fakel Voronezh)
25	FW	NGR	Isah Eliakwu (from (Italy) Varese 1910)
28	FW	RUS	Igor Strelkov (on loan from Krylia Sovetov Samara)
37	GK	UKR	Leonid Musin (free agent)
55	DF	RUS	Badavi Guseynov (from Dagdizel Kaspiysk)
77	DF	GEO	Otar Khizaneishvili (from (Germany) FC Augsburg)

Out: Note: Flags indicate national team as defined under FIFA eligibility rules; some limited exceptions apply. Players may hold more than one non-FIFA nationality.

No.	Pos.	Nation	Player
2	DF	GEO	Dato Kvirkvelia (end of loan from Rubin Kazan)
10	MF	GEO	Gocha Khojava (to Volga Nizhny Novgorod)
25	FW	RUS	Vardan Mazalov (released)
32	FW	GEO	Revazi Barabadze
70	MF	RUS	Eldar Mamayev (to Ural Sverdlovsk Oblast)
71	MF	RUS	Yevgeni Shcherbakov (to Chita)
94	DF	RUS	Ruslan Perepelyukov
—	DF	GEO	Giorgi Navalovski (to Volga Nizhny Novgorod, previously on loan at (Azerbaijan) Inter Baku)
—	FW	GEO	Sandro Iashvili (previously on loan at (Georgia (country)) Olimpi Rustavi)
—	FW	BRA	William (to (Portugal) Vitória, previously unregistered)

=== CSKA Moscow ===
In: Note: Flags indicate national team as defined under FIFA eligibility rules; some limited exceptions apply. Players may hold more than one non-FIFA nationality.

No.	Pos.	Nation	Player
8	FW	CIV	Seydou Doumbia (from (Switzerland) Young Boys)
9	FW	BRA	Vágner Love (end of loan at (Brazil) Flamengo)
21	MF	SRB	Zoran Tošić (from (England) Manchester United)
66	DF	RUS	Igor Dragunov
79	FW	RUS	Konstantin Bazelyuk
88	MF	RUS	Leonid Rodionov
90	DF	RUS	Anton Polyutkin
93	MF	RUS	Gela Zaseyev

Out: Note: Flags indicate national team as defined under FIFA eligibility rules; some limited exceptions apply. Players may hold more than one non-FIFA nationality.

No.	Pos.	Nation	Player
17	MF	SRB	Miloš Krasić (to (Italy) Juventus)
19	MF	CZE	Luboš Kalouda (on loan to Volgar-Gazprom Astrakhan)
20	FW	BRA	Guilherme (end of loan from (Ukraine) Dynamo Kyiv)
23	MF	RUS	Nika Piliyev (on loan to Amkar Perm)
29	FW	NIG	Ouwo Moussa Maazou (on loan to (France) Bordeaux, previously on loan at (France) AS Monaco)
31	DF	RUS	Andrei Vasyanovich (on loan to Spartak Nalchik)
45	MF	RUS	Anton Rukavishnikov
55	DF	RUS	Iskandar Dzhalilov (to Rubin Kazan)
91	FW	RUS	Anton Zabolotny (to Volgar-Gazprom Astrakhan)
—	MF	BRA	Daniel Carvalho (to (Brazil) Atlético Mineiro, previously on loan at (Qatar) Al-Arabi)
—	MF	TUR	Caner Erkin (to (Turkey) Fenerbahçe, previously on loan at (Turkey) Galatasaray)
—	GK	RUS	Veniamin Mandrykin (on loan to Dynamo Bryansk, previously on loan at Spartak Nalchik)
—	MF	RUS	Maksim Fyodorov (on loan to Dynamo Bryansk, previously on loan at Akademiya Togliatti)
—	MF	RUS	Aleksandr Kudryavtsev (on loan to Tyumen, previously on loan at Shinnik Yaroslavl)
—	FW	BRA	Ricardo Jesus (on loan to Spartak Nalchik, previously on loan at (Greece) AEL)

=== Dynamo Moscow ===
In: Note: Flags indicate national team as defined under FIFA eligibility rules; some limited exceptions apply. Players may hold more than one non-FIFA nationality.

No.	Pos.	Nation	Player
2	DF	RUS	Vladimir Kisenkov (from Spartak Nalchik)
18	MF	CRO	Tomislav Dujmović (from Lokomotiv Moscow)
22	FW	GER	Kevin Kurányi (from (Germany) Schalke 04)
26	FW	SVK	Martin Jakubko (from Saturn Moscow Oblast)
32	DF	SRB	Marko Lomić (from (Serbia) Partizan)
40	FW	KOR	Lee Min-Kyu
44	MF	RUS	Grigori Yevstegneyev
94	MF	RUS	Dmitri Zhivoglyadov
95	MF	RUS	Artyom Katashevsky
—	DF	KOR	Her Min-Young

Out: Note: Flags indicate national team as defined under FIFA eligibility rules; some limited exceptions apply. Players may hold more than one non-FIFA nationality.

No.	Pos.	Nation	Player
7	MF	RUS	Kirill Kombarov (to Spartak Moscow)
9	MF	RUS	Dmitri Kombarov (to Spartak Moscow)
11	FW	RUS	Fedor Smolov (on loan to (Netherlands) Feyenoord)
27	MF	RUS	Sergei Terekhov (on loan to Khimki)
91	MF	RUS	Viktor Svezhov (on loan to Tom Tomsk)
—	DF	RUS	Aleksandr Denisov (to Dynamo Bryansk, previously on loan)
—	MF	RUS	Aleksandr Dimidko (to Dynamo Bryansk, previously on loan at SKA-Energiya Khabarovsk)
—	MF	URU	Luis Aguiar (on loan to (Portugal) Braga, previously on loan at the same team)

=== Krylia Sovetov Samara ===
In: Note: Flags indicate national team as defined under FIFA eligibility rules; some limited exceptions apply. Players may hold more than one non-FIFA nationality.

No.	Pos.	Nation	Player
23	MF	BLR	Denis Kovba (from (Czech Republic) Sparta Prague)
27	MF	RUS	Sergey Kuznetsov (on loan from Khimki)
45	DF	RUS	Vladimir Rzhevsky (from (Belarus) BATE Borisov)
47	MF	RUS	Aleksei Khrushchyov
53	MF	RUS	Anton Sosnin (on loan from Zenit Saint Petersburg)
66	MF	BIH	Danijel Majkić (from (Bosnia and Herzegovina) Velež Mostar)
72	MF	RUS	Sergei Nakhlyostkin
73	FW	RUS	Artyom Pinyayev
75	GK	RUS	Mikhail Oparin
80	FW	SLO	Dragan Jelić (on loan from (Slovenia) Maribor)
82	MF	MKD	Artim Položani (from (North Macedonia) Vardar)
88	MF	COL	Juan Carlos Escobar (end of loan at (Colombia) Deportivo Cali)
91	FW	RUS	Pavel Yakovlev (on loan from Spartak Moscow)

Out: Note: Flags indicate national team as defined under FIFA eligibility rules; some limited exceptions apply. Players may hold more than one non-FIFA nationality.

No.	Pos.	Nation	Player
11	FW	RUS	Igor Strelkov (on loan to Anzhi Makhachkala)
15	DF	RUS	Pavel Ivashentsev
18	FW	RUS	Aleksandr Alkhazov (to Alania Vladikavkaz)
20	FW	RUS	Aleksandr Salugin (to Volga Nizhny Novgorod)
24	FW	RUS	Maksim Kretov
25	MF	RUS	Artur Rylov (on loan to Spartak Nalchik)
26	MF	RUS	Maksim Chistyakov (released)
28	MF	RUS	Ruslan Gazzayev (to Taganrog)
35	GK	RUS	Ruslan Yonchev (released)
55	FW	RUS	Pavel Kiryanov (to Nika Moscow)
56	DF	RUS	Aleksandr Khramov (on loan to Gornyak Uchaly)
57	MF	RUS	Valeri Kruntyayev (released)
68	FW	RUS	Andrei Chasovskikh (released)
81	MF	RUS	Yevgeni Popkov (released)
90	FW	MNE	Bogdan Milić (released, previously at (Netherlands) ADO Den Haag)
—	MF	RUS	Yevgeni Pesegov (on loan to Gazovik Orenburg, previously on loan at Nizhny Novgorod)

=== Lokomotiv Moscow ===
In: Note: Flags indicate national team as defined under FIFA eligibility rules; some limited exceptions apply. Players may hold more than one non-FIFA nationality.

No.	Pos.	Nation	Player
10	MF	RUS	Dmitri Loskov (from Saturn Moscow Oblast)
28	DF	SVK	Ján Ďurica (end of loan at (Germany) Hannover 96)
49	DF	RUS	Roman Shishkin (from Spartak Moscow)

Out: Note: Flags indicate national team as defined under FIFA eligibility rules; some limited exceptions apply. Players may hold more than one non-FIFA nationality.

No.	Pos.	Nation	Player
3	DF	RUS	Oleg Kuzmin (to Rubin Kazan)
5	MF	CRO	Tomislav Dujmović (to Dynamo Moscow)
9	FW	NGR	Peter Odemwingie (to (England) West Bromwich Albion)
18	MF	RUS	Vladislav Ignatyev (on loan to Kuban Krasnodar)
36	DF	RUS	Makhmadnaim Sharifi (to (Austria) Kapfenberger SV)
45	FW	RUS	Aleksandr Minchenkov (on loan to Dynamo Bryansk)
69	DF	RUS	Sergei Yefimov (on loan to Dynamo Bryansk)
75	DF	RUS	Pavel Novitskiy (to Nika Moscow)
—	GK	ITA	Ivan Pelizzoli (to (Italy) Cagliari Calcio, previously on loan at (Italy) AlbinoLeffe)

=== FC Rostov ===
In: Note: Flags indicate national team as defined under FIFA eligibility rules; some limited exceptions apply. Players may hold more than one non-FIFA nationality.

No.	Pos.	Nation	Player
23	MF	BUL	Chavdar Yankov (on loan from (Ukraine) Metalurh Donetsk)
55	MF	RUS	Aleksandr Tumasyan
56	MF	RUS	David Tkebuchava

Out: Note: Flags indicate national team as defined under FIFA eligibility rules; some limited exceptions apply. Players may hold more than one non-FIFA nationality.

No.	Pos.	Nation	Player
6	DF	CZE	Roman Lengyel (to (Czech Republic) Dynamo České Budějovice)
27	GK	RUS	Maksim Kabanov (on loan to Salyut Belgorod)
43	FW	RUS	Kirill Zaika (on loan to Taganrog)
46	FW	RUS	Konstantin Yavorskiy
47	DF	RUS	Vladimir Shamara (on loan to Taganrog)
51	DF	RUS	Stanislav Engovatov (to Dynamo Vologda)
52	DF	RUS	Andrei Semenchuk
87	FW	RUS	Yevgeni Lutsenko (on loan to Salyut Belgorod)

=== Rubin Kazan ===
In: Note: Flags indicate national team as defined under FIFA eligibility rules; some limited exceptions apply. Players may hold more than one non-FIFA nationality.

No.	Pos.	Nation	Player
2	DF	RUS	Oleg Kuzmin (from Lokomotiv Moscow)
21	FW	MDA	Alexandru Antoniuc (from (Moldova) Zimbru Chişinău)
25	DF	GEO	Dato Kvirkvelia (end of loan at Anzhi Makhachkala)
26	FW	RUS	Aleksei Medvedev (from Sibir Novosibirsk)
27	DF	ITA	Salvatore Bocchetti (from (Italy) Genoa)
28	FW	NGR	Obafemi Martins (from (Germany) VfL Wolfsburg)
44	GK	LTU	Giedrius Arlauskis (from (Romania) Unirea Urziceni)
51	DF	GEO	Avtandil Bratchuli
84	MF	RUS	Iskandar Dzhalilov (from CSKA Moscow)
85	MF	RUS	Marat Sitdikov (from Rubin-2 Kazan)
87	MF	BRA	Carlos Eduardo (from (Germany) TSG Hoffenheim)
88	FW	BLR	Sergei Kornilenko (on loan from Zenit Saint Petersburg)

Out: Note: Flags indicate national team as defined under FIFA eligibility rules; some limited exceptions apply. Players may hold more than one non-FIFA nationality.

No.	Pos.	Nation	Player
7	MF	RUS	Sergei Semak (to Zenit Saint Petersburg)
10	FW	TUR	Fatih Tekke (to (Turkey) Beşiktaş)
11	FW	RUS	Aleksandr Bukharov (to Zenit Saint Petersburg)
20	FW	UZB	Bahodir Nasimov (on loan to (Azerbaijan) Neftchi Baku)
30	GK	RUS	Yevgeni Cheremisin (on loan to Dynamo Saint Petersburg)
33	DF	ESP	Jordi (on loan to (Spain) Real Valladolid)
43	MF	RUS	Aleksei Kotlyarov (on loan to Khimki)
49	MF	UZB	Vagiz Galiulin (on loan to Sibir Novosibirsk)
67	FW	UZB	Davron Mirzayev (on loan to Khimki)
68	FW	RUS	Ilya Kukharchuk (to Anzhi Makhachkala)
82	DF	RUS	Mikhail Mischenko (on loan to (Latvia) Ventspils)
99	FW	TUR	Hasan Kabze (to (France) Montpellier)

=== Saturn Moscow Oblast ===
In: Note: Flags indicate national team as defined under FIFA eligibility rules; some limited exceptions apply. Players may hold more than one non-FIFA nationality.

No.	Pos.	Nation	Player
22	MF	ARM	Zhora Hovhannisyan
25	MF	SVK	Kamil Kopúnek (on loan from (Slovakia) Spartak Trnava)
30	GK	RUS	Aleksandr Makarov (end of loan at Dynamo Saint Petersburg)
40	MF	RUS	Yevgeni Degtyaryov (from Saturn-2 Moscow Oblast)
72	MF	RUS	Vladimir Torshentsev (previously on loan at Saturn-2 Moscow Oblast)
73	FW	RUS	Anton Trubitsin
74	FW	RUS	Temuri Bukiya
75	MF	RUS	Viktor Lipin
76	FW	RUS	Konstantin Savichev
90	GK	RUS	Aleksandr Romanov (end of loan at Saturn-2 Moscow Oblast)

Out: Note: Flags indicate national team as defined under FIFA eligibility rules; some limited exceptions apply. Players may hold more than one non-FIFA nationality.

No.	Pos.	Nation	Player
10	MF	RUS	Dmitri Loskov (to Lokomotiv Moscow)
13	MF	RUS	Dmitri Kudryashov (to Luch-Energiya Vladivostok)
19	DF	SLO	Denis Halilović (on loan to (Netherlands) Willem II Tilburg)
20	FW	SVK	Martin Jakubko (to Dynamo Moscow)
31	MF	UKR	Yevhen Levchenko (to (Netherlands) Willem II Tilburg)
43	MF	RUS	Andrei Savchenko (to Saturn-2 Moscow Oblast)
48	MF	RUS	Daniil Mots (on loan to Saturn-2 Moscow Oblast)
63	DF	RUS	Yevgeni Malkov (on loan to Dynamo Saint Petersburg)
65	GK	RUS	Mikhail Filippov (on loan to Saturn-2 Moscow Oblast)
80	GK	RUS	Aleksei Skornyakov (on loan to Znamya Truda Orekhovo-Zuyevo)
92	MF	RUS	Artyom Pershin (to Dynamo Saint Petersburg)
—	DF	RUS	Vladimir Poluyakhtov (to Dynamo Saint Petersburg, previously on loan at Saturn-2 Moscow Oblast)
—	MF	RUS	Anton Kozlov (on loan to Khimki, previously on loan at Avangard Kursk)

=== Sibir Novosibirsk ===
In: Note: Flags indicate national team as defined under FIFA eligibility rules; some limited exceptions apply. Players may hold more than one non-FIFA nationality.

No.	Pos.	Nation	Player
2	DF	RUS	Adessoye Oyewole (on loan from Ural Sverdlovsk Oblast)
6	DF	FRA	Steeve Joseph-Reinette (on loan from (Bulgaria) Slavia Sofia)
12	FW	POL	Bartłomiej Grzelak (from (Poland) Legia Warszawa)
25	MF	MKD	Veliče Šumulikoski (from (England) Preston North End)
28	MF	COL	Roger Cañas (from (Latvia) Tranzit)
40	GK	CZE	Petr Vašek (on loan from (Czech Republic) Slovácko)
49	MF	UZB	Vagiz Galiulin (on loan from Rubin Kazan)
62	FW	RUS	Gia Kulumbegashvili
80	MF	RUS	Sergei Korotkov (from Sibir-LFL)
96	MF	RUS	Ivan Stain (from Akademiya Togliatti)

Out: Note: Flags indicate national team as defined under FIFA eligibility rules; some limited exceptions apply. Players may hold more than one non-FIFA nationality.

No.	Pos.	Nation	Player
8	MF	RUS	Aleksandr Makarenko (on loan to Zhemchuzhina-Sochi)
10	FW	BLR	Gennady Bliznyuk (released)
13	FW	RUS	Aleksei Medvedev (to Rubin Kazan)
20	MF	RUS	Aleksandr Shulenin (to Volga Nizhny Novgorod)
61	DF	RUS	Roman Amirkhanov (to Spartak Nalchik)
66	MF	RUS	Aleksandr Mineyev (to SKA-Energiya Khabarovsk)
79	FW	RUS	Vitali Sidorov
98	DF	RUS	Denis Gudayev (on loan to Radian-Baikal Irkutsk)

=== Spartak Moscow ===
In: Note: Flags indicate national team as defined under FIFA eligibility rules; some limited exceptions apply. Players may hold more than one non-FIFA nationality.

No.	Pos.	Nation	Player
18	DF	RUS	Andrei Ivanov (end of loan at Tom Tomsk)
19	DF	ARG	Nicolás Pareja (from (Spain) Espanyol)
34	DF	RUS	Artyom Filatov
54	DF	RUS	Ivan Khomukha
56	GK	RUS	Aleksandr Belenov (from Salyut Belgorod)
60	MF	RUS	Vladimir Zubarev
64	MF	IRL	Aiden McGeady (from (Scotland) Celtic)
65	DF	RUS	Denis Kutin (from Chertanovo Moscow)
67	MF	RUS	Dmitri Tumenko (end of loan at Dynamo Bryansk)
77	MF	RUS	Kirill Kombarov (from Dynamo Moscow)
81	GK	UKR	Andriy Dikan (from Terek Grozny)
89	FW	RUS	Aleksandr Prudnikov (end of loan at Tom Tomsk)
99	MF	RUS	Dmitri Kombarov (from Dynamo Moscow)

Out: Note: Flags indicate national team as defined under FIFA eligibility rules; some limited exceptions apply. Players may hold more than one non-FIFA nationality.

No.	Pos.	Nation	Player
1	GK	RUS	Soslan Dzhanayev (on loan to Terek Grozny)
4	DF	RUS	Roman Shishkin (to Lokomotiv Moscow)
13	DF	RUS	Fyodor Kudryashov (on loan to Tom Tomsk)
14	FW	RUS	Pavel Yakovlev (on loan to Krylia Sovetov Samara)
22	GK	CRO	Stipe Pletikosa (on loan to (England) Tottenham Hotspur)
25	DF	CZE	Martin Jiránek (to (England) Birmingham City)
29	MF	RUS	Pavel Golyshev (on loan to Alania Vladikavkaz)
35	DF	RUS	Aleksandr Kozhevnikov (to Dynamo Bryansk)
38	MF	UKR	Yegor Lugachyov (on loan to (Ukraine) Arsenal Kyiv)
45	DF	RUS	Konstantin Kadeyev (to Dynamo Bryansk)
52	MF	RUS	Oleg Dineyev (to Dynamo Bryansk)
74	DF	GER	Malik Fathi (on loan to (Germany) Mainz 05)
—	MF	RUS	Vladislav Ryzhkov (to Zhemchuzhina-Sochi, previously on loan at Shinnik Yaroslavl)

=== Spartak Nalchik ===
In: Note: Flags indicate national team as defined under FIFA eligibility rules; some limited exceptions apply. Players may hold more than one non-FIFA nationality.

No.	Pos.	Nation	Player
19	DF	RUS	Roman Amirkhanov (from Sibir Novosibirsk)
25	DF	BIH	Bojan Marković (on loan from (Bosnia and Herzegovina) Čelik Zenica)
28	MF	SRB	Jovan Golić (on loan from (Serbia) Inđija)
29	DF	MNE	Milan Jovanović (from (Austria) Rapid Wien)
38	DF	RUS	Andrei Vasyanovich (on loan from CSKA Moscow)
41	MF	RUS	Maksim Kovalskiy
42	MF	RUS	Amirkhan Shavayev
43	MF	RUS	Artur Rylov (on loan from Krylia Sovetov Samara)
60	FW	BRA	Ricardo Jesus (on loan from CSKA Moscow)
73	GK	LAT	Aleksandrs Koliņko (from (Latvia) Ventspils)
88	DF	RUS	Aleksandr Khokhlov (on loan from Zenit Saint Petersburg)
99	MF	RUS	Aslan Dyshekov (from Irtysh Omsk)

Out: Note: Flags indicate national team as defined under FIFA eligibility rules; some limited exceptions apply. Players may hold more than one non-FIFA nationality.

No.	Pos.	Nation	Player
2	DF	RUS	Vladislav Khatazhyonkov (to Tom Tomsk)
5	DF	GEO	Aleksandr Amisulashvili (to (Turkey) Kayserispor)
6	DF	RUS	Ivan Lapin (end of loan from Zenit Saint Petersburg)
9	MF	UZB	Marat Bikmaev (to Alania Vladikavkaz)
14	FW	COD	Patrick Etshini (end of loan)
15	FW	SLO	Dejan Rusič (end of loan from (Romania) Timișoara)
16	GK	RUS	Veniamin Mandrykin (end of loan from CSKA Moscow)
18	DF	RUS	Vladimir Kisenkov (to Dynamo Moscow)
26	GK	RUS	Anton Antipov (to Druzhba Maykop)
50	MF	RUS	Valeri Zrumov (on loan to Nara-ShBFR Naro-Fominsk)
—	FW	BRA	Felipe Almeida Félix (to (Portugal) Leixões, previously on loan at (Brazil) Rio Branco)

=== Terek Grozny ===
In: Note: Flags indicate national team as defined under FIFA eligibility rules; some limited exceptions apply. Players may hold more than one non-FIFA nationality.

No.	Pos.	Nation	Player
1	GK	RUS	Soslan Dzhanayev (on loan from Spartak Moscow)
14	DF	CMR	Herve Xavier Zengue (from (Czech Republic) Viktoria Žižkov)
28	FW	BRA	Rodrigo Tiuí (from (Brazil) Atlético Paranaense)
63	MF	RUS	Vadim Belozerov

Out: Note: Flags indicate national team as defined under FIFA eligibility rules; some limited exceptions apply. Players may hold more than one non-FIFA nationality.

No.	Pos.	Nation	Player
6	DF	BRA	Santana (end of loan from (Brazil) Náutico)
24	MF	RUS	Dmitry Alexandrovich Smirnov (on loan to Luch-Energiya Vladivostok)
31	GK	UKR	Andriy Dikan (to from Spartak Moscow)
47	DF	RUS	Khasan Dzhunidov
86	MF	AZE	Kerim Diniyev

=== Tom Tomsk ===
In: Note: Flags indicate national team as defined under FIFA eligibility rules; some limited exceptions apply. Players may hold more than one non-FIFA nationality.

No.	Pos.	Nation	Player
18	DF	RUS	Vladislav Khatazhyonkov (from Spartak Nalchik)
21	DF	SRB	Nikola Petković (on loan from (Germany) Eintracht Frankfurt)
33	MF	JPN	Daisuke Matsui (on loan from (France) Grenoble)
38	DF	RUS	Fyodor Kudryashov (on loan from Spartak Moscow)
52	MF	RUS	Ilya Protasov
75	MF	RUS	Viktor Svezhov (on loan from Dynamo Moscow)
80	MF	RUS	Yevgeni Chernov

Out: Note: Flags indicate national team as defined under FIFA eligibility rules; some limited exceptions apply. Players may hold more than one non-FIFA nationality.

No.	Pos.	Nation	Player
1	GK	RUS	Yegor Ridosh (on loan to Khimik Dzerzhinsk)
4	MF	RUS	Vasili Yanotovsky (to SKA-Energiya Khabarovsk)
7	MF	RUS	Vitali Volkov (to Volga Nizhny Novgorod)
8	FW	RUS	Denis Kiselyov (to Volgar-Gazprom Astrakhan)
14	FW	BLR	Sergei Kornilenko (end of loan from Zenit Saint Petersburg)
15	DF	RUS	Sergei Golyatkin (on loan to SKA-Energiya Khabarovsk)
17	DF	RUS	Andrei Ivanov (end of loan from Spartak Moscow)
19	FW	RUS	Aleksandr Prudnikov (end of loan from Spartak Moscow)
49	MF	RUS	Alexey Yakimov (on loan to Khimik Dzerzhinsk)
51	FW	RUS	Nikita Kozlov
71	MF	RUS	Roman Grokhin
81	MF	HUN	Norbert Németh (to (Hungary) Vasas)

=== Zenit Saint Petersburg ===
In: Note: Flags indicate national team as defined under FIFA eligibility rules; some limited exceptions apply. Players may hold more than one non-FIFA nationality.

No.	Pos.	Nation	Player
3	DF	POR	Bruno Alves (from (Portugal) Porto)
9	FW	RUS	Aleksandr Bukharov (from Rubin Kazan)
24	DF	SRB	Aleksandar Luković (from (Italy) Udinese)
25	MF	RUS	Sergei Semak (from Rubin Kazan)
89	DF	GEO	Solomon Kverkvelia
—	DF	RUS	Ivan Lapin (end of loan at Spartak Nalchik)

Out: Note: Flags indicate national team as defined under FIFA eligibility rules; some limited exceptions apply. Players may hold more than one non-FIFA nationality.

No.	Pos.	Nation	Player
7	DF	CZE	Radek Šírl (to (Czech Republic) Mladá Boleslav)
28	DF	DEN	Michael Lumb (on loan to (Netherlands) Feyenoord)
29	DF	FRA	Sebastien Puygrenier (on loan to (France) AS Monaco, previously on loan at the same team)
35	MF	RUS	Anton Sosnin (on loan to Krylia Sovetov Samara)
37	DF	RUS	Aleksandr Khokhlov (on loan to Spartak Nalchik)
—	FW	BLR	Sergei Kornilenko (on loan to Rubin Kazan, previously on loan at Tom Tomsk)
—	FW	RUS	Pavel Ignatovich (on loan to Khimki, previously unregistered)
