= Tumenko =

Tumenko (Russian: Туменко) is a gender-neutral Slavic surname. Notable people with the surname include:

- Aleksandr Tumenko (born 1983), Russian football player
- Dmitri Tumenko (born 1989), Russian football player
