= Elektrostal =

City in Moscow Oblast, Russia

Elektrostal Электросталь
- City
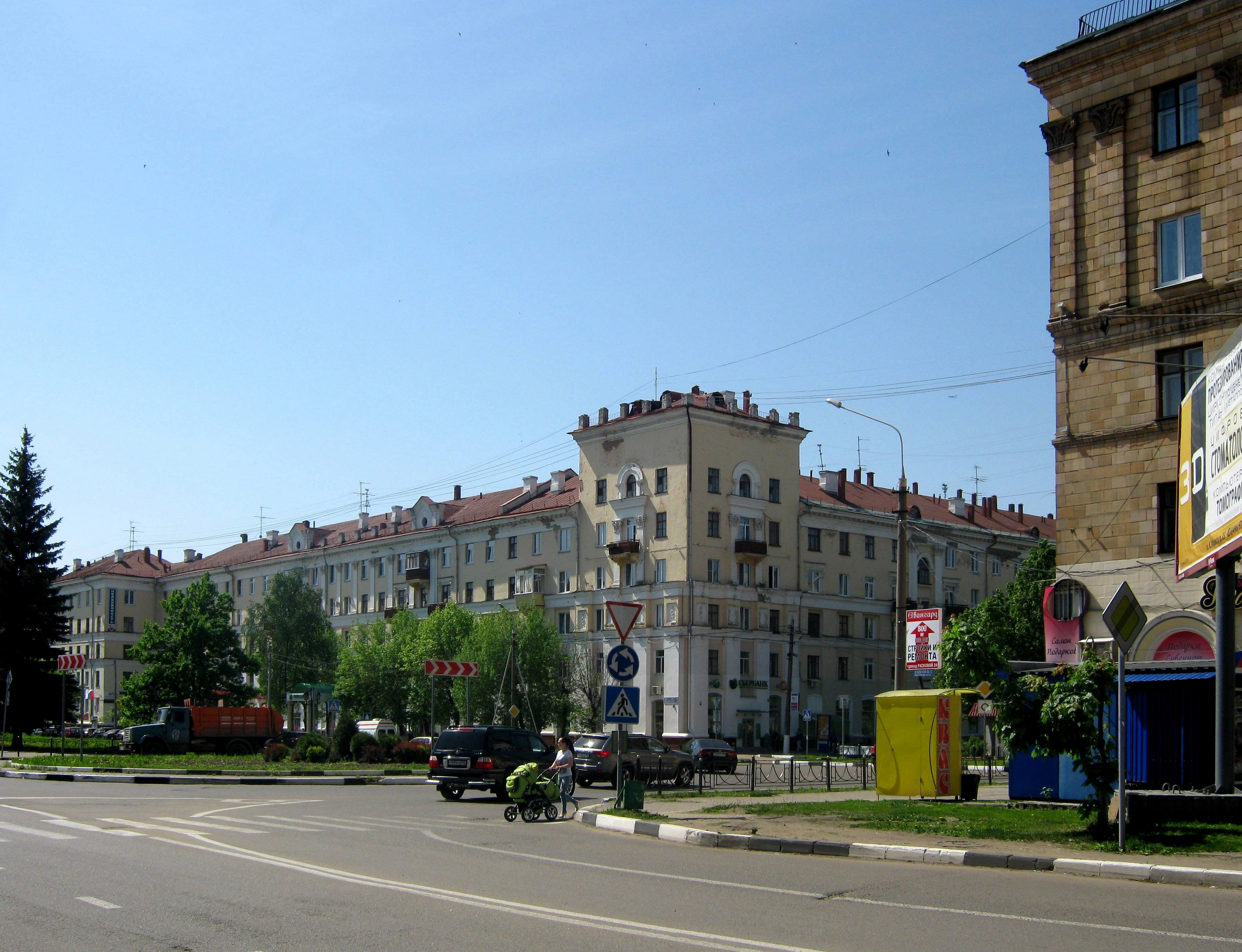
- Intersection of Lenin Avenue, June 2014

- Flag Coat of arms
- Interactive map of Elektrostal
- Location of Elektrostal Elektrostal (Moscow Oblast)
- Coordinates: 55°47′N 38°28′E
- Country: Russia
- Federal subject: Moscow Oblast
- Founded: 1916
- City status since: 1938

Government
  - Head: Tihon Zhdanov
- Elevation: 150 m (490 ft)

Population (2010 Census)
  - Total: 155,196
  - Estimate (2025): 143,048 (−7.8%)
  - Rank: 114th in 2010

Administrative status
  - Subordinated to: Elektrostal City Under Oblast Jurisdiction
  - Capital of: Elektrostal City Under Oblast Jurisdiction

Municipal status
  - Urban okrug: Elektrostal Urban Okrug
  - Capital of: Elektrostal Urban Okrug
- Time zone: UTC+3 (MSK)
- Postal code: 144000—144012
- Dialing code: +7 49657
- OKTMO ID: 46790000001
- Website: www.electrostal.ru

Elektrostal (Russian: Электросталь, pronounced [ɛˌlʲektrɐˈstalʲ]) is a city in Moscow Oblast, Russia, located 58 kilometers (36 mi) east of Moscow. Population: 155,196 (2010 census); 146,294 (2002 census); 152,463 (1989 Soviet census); 135,000 (1977); 123,000 (1970); 97,000 (1959); 43,000 (1939). It was previously known as Zatishye (until 1928).

== Etymology ==
The name Elektrostal originates from the Russian words of Электро (Elektro), lit. 'Electric' and Сталь (Stal), lit. 'Steel'.

It was known as Zatishye (Затишье) until 1928.

== History ==
In 1938, Elektrostal was granted town status.

In 2026 four young men on a bus made insulting remarks to other passengers, to which another young man objected, after which they got off the bus and had an altercation at the bus stop, which resulted in the lone man fatally stabbing one of the four.

== Administrative and municipal status ==
Within the framework of administrative divisions, it is incorporated as Elektrostal City Under Oblast Jurisdiction—an administrative unit with the status equal to that of the districts. As a municipal division, Elektrostal City Under Oblast Jurisdiction is incorporated as Elektrostal Urban Okrug.

== Economy ==
Elektrostal is a center of metallurgy and heavy machinery manufacturing. Major companies include:

- Elektrostal metallurgical factory
- Elektrostal chemical-mechanical factory
- Elektrostal Heavy Engineering Works, JSC is a designer and manufacturer of equipment for producing seamless hot-rolled, cold-rolled and welded steel materials and metallurgical equipment.
- MSZ, also known as Elemash, Russia's largest producer of fuel rod assemblies for nuclear power plants, which are exported to many countries in Europe.
- Wildberries distribution center

The 9th radio center in Elektrostal is home to a high power medium wave transmitter.

The first S-400 Triumf missile defense system was deployed at Elektrostal, becoming fully operational on 1 July 2007.

=== Transportation ===
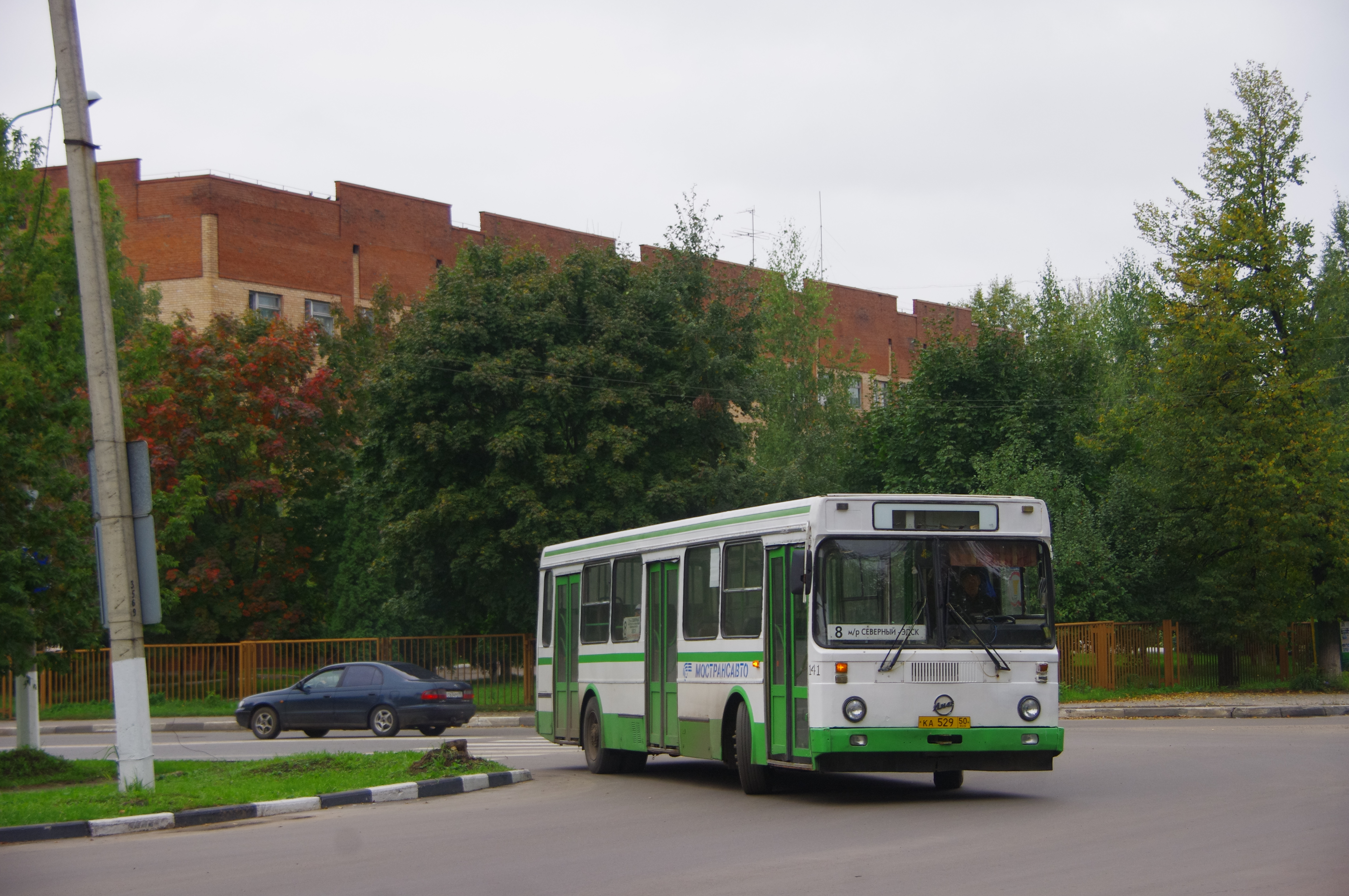
LiAZ-5256 bus

Elektrostal is linked by Elektrichka suburban electric trains to Moscow's Kursky Rail Terminal with a travel time of 1 hour and 20 minutes. Long-distance buses link Elektrostal to Noginsk, Moscow and other nearby towns. Local public transport includes buses.

== Sports ==
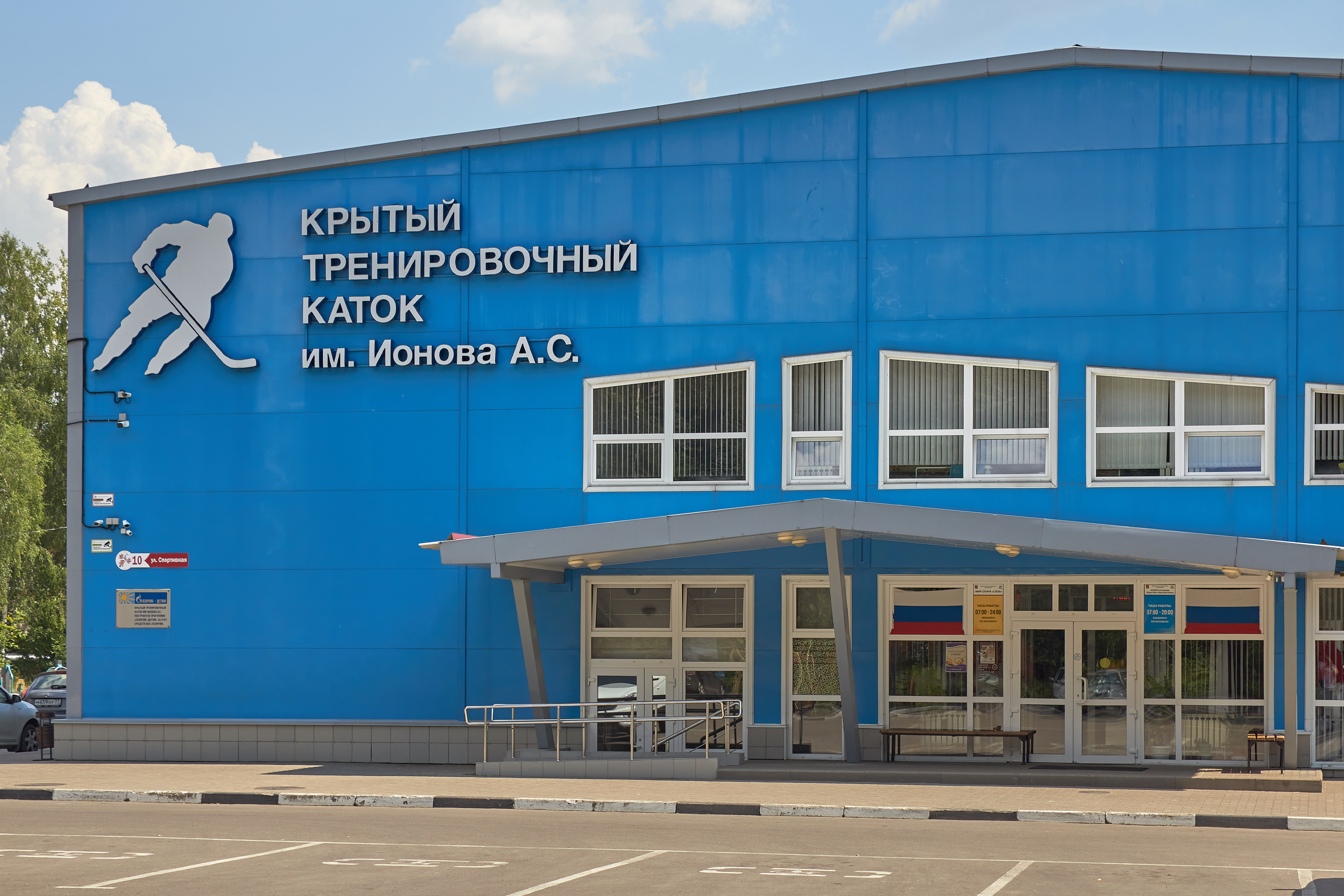
Indoor practice ice rink named after A. Ionov.

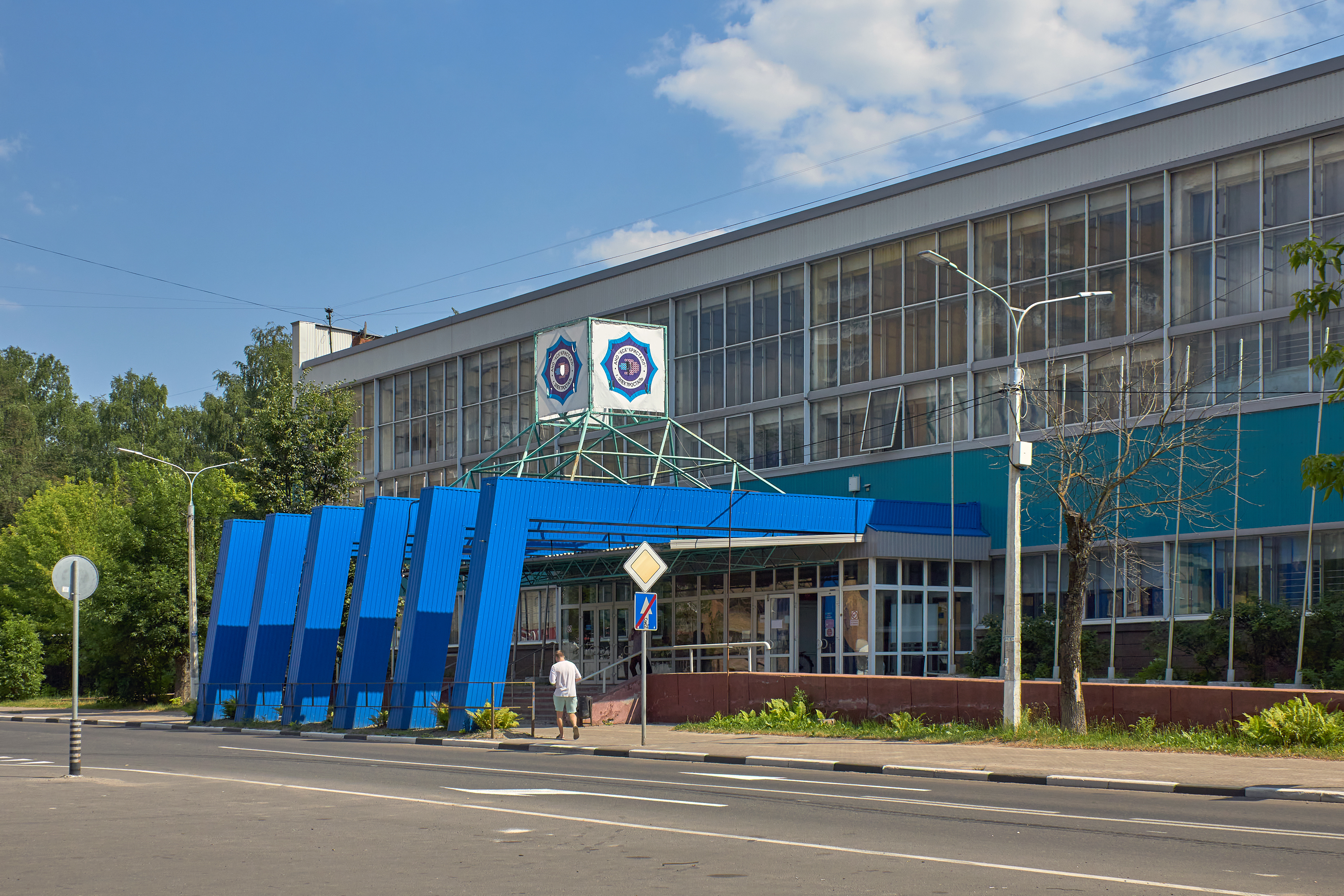
Pool "Kristall" – school of the Olympic reserve: diving, synchronized swimming, swimming.

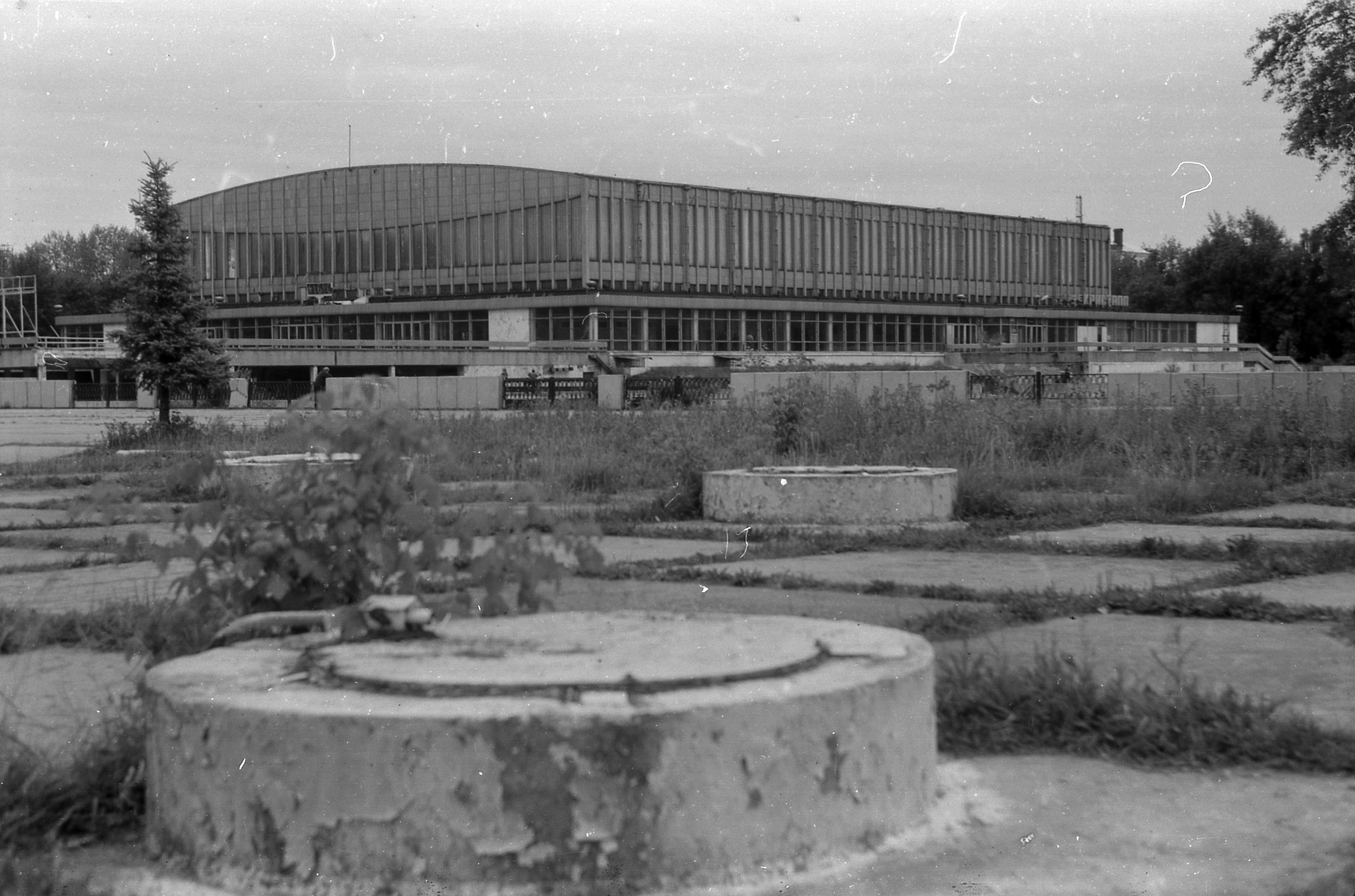
Home arena hockey team Kristall Elektrostal – Ledovyi Dvorets Sporta "Kristall" in 1995.

The city ice hockey team Kristall Elektrostal was established in 1949 and plays in the Junior Hockey League Division B.

== Notable people ==
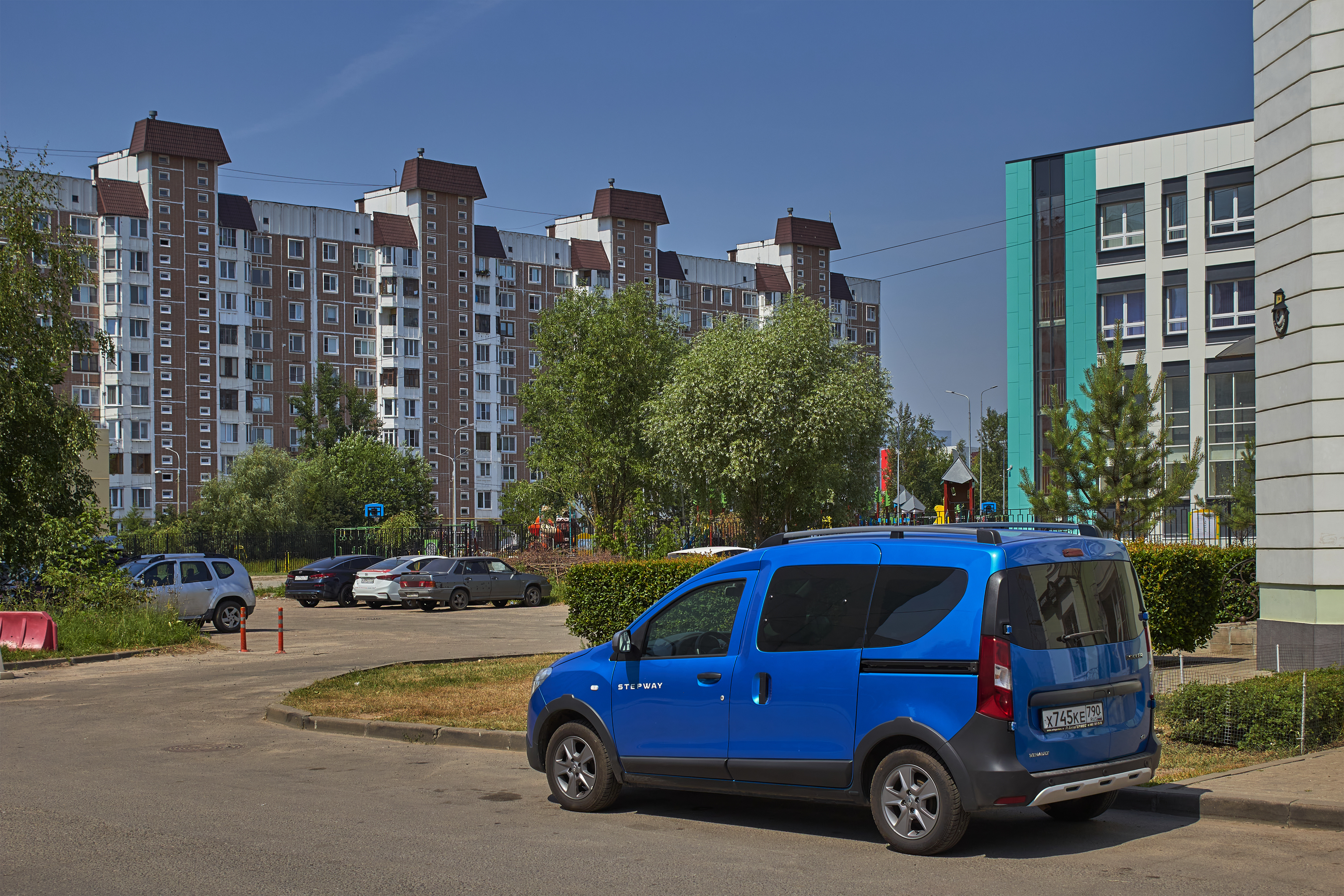
Nikolay Vtorov Street

- Irina Baeva, actress
- Yevgeni Malkov, association football player
- Anastasia Pozdniakova, Olympic diver
- Vitali Proshkin, ice hockey player
- Vladimir Zharkov, ice hockey player
- Nikolay Vtorov, industrialist
- Ivan Sergeyevich Kuznetsov, city architect
- Vyacheslav Zudov, cosmonaut
- Evgeni Kovyrshin, ice hockey player
- Sergei Arekayev, ice hockey player
- Imomali Turdiev, involved in famous criminal case

== International relations ==
Elektrostal is twinned with:

- Pernik, Bulgaria
- Polotsk, Belarus
- Strumica, North Macedonia
