= Anton Khodyrev =

Russian footballer

Personal information
- Full name: Anton Alekseyevich Khodyrev
- Date of birth: 26 January 1992 (age 34)
- Place of birth: Moscow, Russia
- Height: 1.79 m (5 ft 10 in)
- Position: Left back

Youth career
- 2004–2009: FC Spartak Moscow

Senior career*
Years	Team	Apps	(Gls)
2010–2016	FC Spartak Moscow	3	(0)
2012–2013	→ FC Sibir Novosibirsk (loan)	11	(0)
2013–2016	→ FC Spartak-2 Moscow	60	(0)
2016–2017	FC Sokol Saratov	37	(0)
2017	FC Anzhi-Yunior Zelenodolsk	3	(0)
2018	FC Kaluga	9	(0)

International career
2010	Russia U-18	5	(2)
2010–2011	Russia U-19	8	(1)
2012	Russia U-20	3	(0)
2012	Russia U-21	4	(0)
- * Club domestic league appearances and goals

Anton Alekseyevich Khodyrev (Russian: Антон Алексеевич Ходырев; born 26 January 1992) is a Russian former footballer.

== Career ==
Khodyrev made his professional debut for Spartak Moscow on 13 July 2010 in the Russian Cup game against FC Metallurg Lipetsk. His debut in the Russian Premier League came on 30 October 2010 in the starting line-up in a 2–1 win with FC Rostov.
