= Nikolai Ivannikov =

Russian footballer

Personal information
- Full name: Nikolai Nikolayevich Ivannikov
- Date of birth: 16 February 1992 (age 34)
- Place of birth: Lipetsk, Russian SFSR
- Height: 1.70 m (5 ft 7 in)
- Position: Forward

Youth career
- –2005: FC Metallurg Lipetsk
- 2005–2009: Konoplyov football academy

Senior career*
Years	Team	Apps	(Gls)
2009–2010	FC Academia Dimitrovgrad	26	(10)
2010	→ FC Spartak Moscow (loan)	0	(0)
2011	FC Zhemchuzhina-Sochi	2	(0)
2011–2013	FC Gazovik Orenburg	39	(5)
2014	FC Tosno	10	(2)
2014–2015	FC Saturn Ramenskoye	26	(2)
2015–2019	FC Metallurg Lipetsk	91	(24)
2019–2020	FC Akron Tolyatti	38	(8)
2021	FC Metallurg Lipetsk	33	(2)
2022	FC Dynamo Bryansk	12	(4)
2022–2023	FC Metallurg Lipetsk	32	(8)
2023	SC Astrakhan	13	(1)
2024	FC Nosta Novotroitsk	18	(6)

International career
2010	Russia U-18	5	(4)
2010	Russia U-19	8	(4)
- * Club domestic league appearances and goals as of 19 October 2024

Nikolai Nikolayevich Ivannikov (Russian: Николай Николаевич Иванников; born 16 February 1992) is a Russian professional football player.

== Club career ==
He made his Russian Football National League debut for FC Zhemchuzhina-Sochi on 28 April 2011 in a game against FC Fakel Voronezh.
