= Aleksandr Kobzev =

Russian footballer

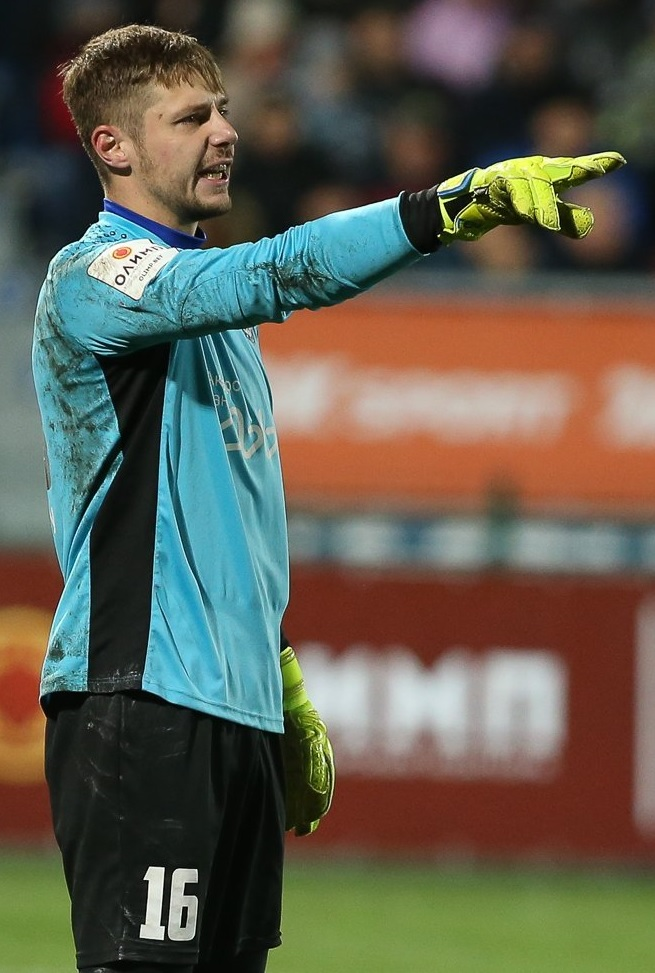
- Kobzev with KAMAZ Naberezhnye Chelny in 2019

Personal information
- Full name: Aleksandr Yuryevich Kobzev
- Date of birth: 4 May 1989 (age 37)
- Place of birth: Lipetsk, Russian SFSR
- Height: 1.82 m (6 ft 0 in)
- Position: Goalkeeper

Team information
- Current team: FC Metallurg Lipetsk
- Number: 16

Youth career
- FC Metallurg Lipetsk

Senior career*
Years	Team	Apps	(Gls)
2009–2016	FC Metallurg Lipetsk	99	(0)
2016–2017	FC Fakel Voronezh	10	(0)
2017	FC Rotor Volgograd	22	(0)
2018	FC Avangard Kursk	4	(0)
2018–2019	FC Mordovia Saransk	33	(0)
2019–2020	FC KAMAZ Naberezhnye Chelny	17	(0)
2020–	FC Metallurg Lipetsk	107	(0)
- * Club domestic league appearances and goals as of 31 October 2026

Aleksandr Yuryevich Kobzev (Russian: Александр Юрьевич Кобзев; born 4 May 1989) is a Russian professional football player who plays for FC Metallurg Lipetsk.

== Club career ==
He made his Russian Football National League debut for FC Fakel Voronezh on 19 November 2016 in a game against FC Tosno.

He played in the 2017–18 Russian Cup final for FC Avangard Kursk on 9 May 2018 in the Volgograd Arena against 2-1 winners FC Tosno.

== Honours ==
- Russian Professional Football League Zone Center Best Player: 2015–16.
