= Yevgeni Makeyev =

Russian footballer (born 1989)

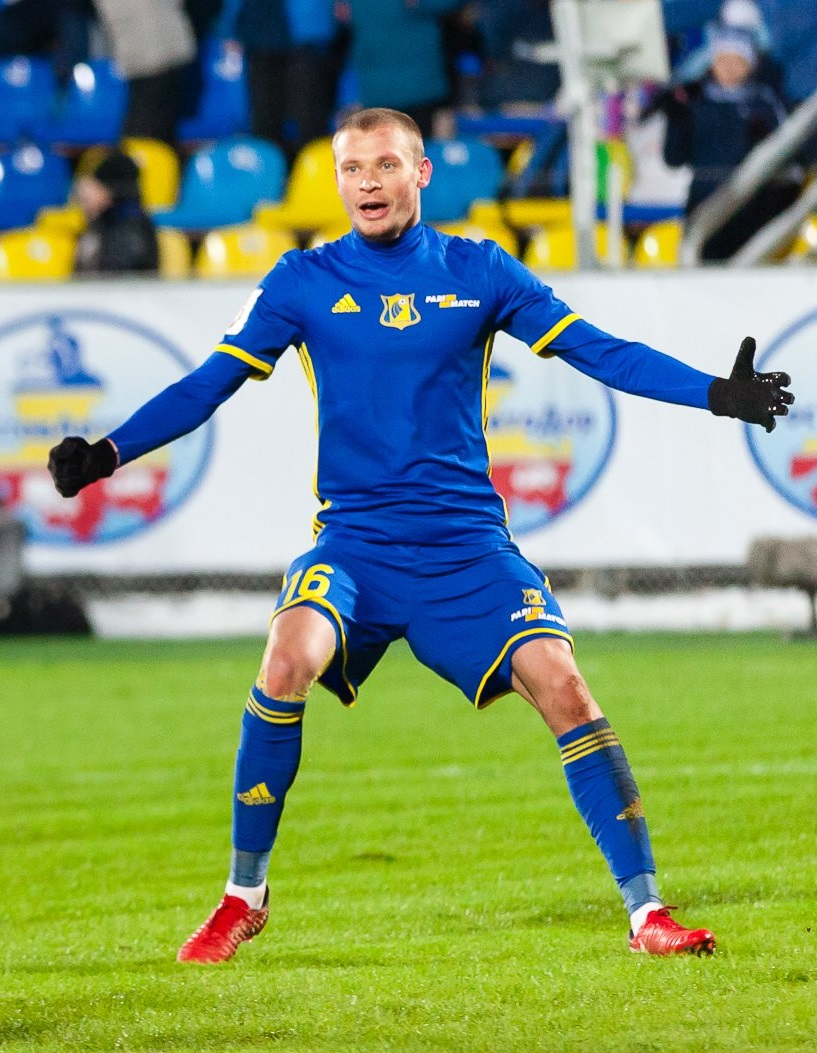
- Makeyev with Rostov in 2017

Personal information
- Full name: Yevgeni Vladimirovich Makeyev
- Date of birth: 24 July 1989 (age 37)
- Place of birth: Cherepovets, Russian SFSR
- Height: 1.82 m (6 ft 0 in)
- Position: Left back

Team information
- Current team: Broke Boys Moscow

Youth career
- Severstal Cherepovets

Senior career*
Years	Team	Apps	(Gls)
2006–2007	Sheksna Cherepovets	42	(2)
2007–2017	Spartak Moscow	165	(3)
2014–2017	→ Spartak-2 Moscow	6	(1)
2017–2018	Rostov	16	(0)
2018	Sochi	7	(0)
2019	Rotor Volgograd	4	(0)
2019–2020	Ararat Yerevan	8	(0)
2021	Metallurg Bekabad	4	(0)
2021–2023	Veles Moscow	64	(2)
2024	Rodina Media (amateur)		
2025–	Broke Boys Moscow (amateur)		

International career
2009–2010	Russia U-21	11	(0)
2011	Russia-2	3	(0)
2011–2015	Russia	3	(0)
- * Club domestic league appearances and goals

Yevgeni Vladimirovich Makeyev or Evgeniy Makeev (Russian: Евгений Владимирович Макеев; born 24 July 1989) is a Russian former association football player who played as a left-back or centre-back. He plays for amateur club Broke Boys Moscow.

== Club career ==
He made his debut in the Russian Premier League on 15 March 2009 in a game against FC Zenit St. Petersburg.

Makeyev is able to play as a wide midfielder on either wing, but he is used mainly as a left back.

He was released from his contract with FC Rostov by mutual consent on 23 August 2018.

On 4 July 2019, he signed a one-year contract with Armenian club FC Ararat Yerevan.

== International career ==
Makeyev was a part of the Russia U-21 side that was competing in the 2011 European Under-21 Championship qualification.

In March 2011, he was called up for the first time to the Russia national football team. He made his national team debut on 29 March 2011 in a friendly against Qatar after coming on as a half time substitute for Yuri Zhirkov. After a period when he was not called up, he played for the national team once again on 18 November 2014 in a friendly against Hungary.

== Personal life ==
His father Vladimir Makeyev played in the Russian First League in the 1990s for FC Zhemchuzhina Sochi, FC Baltika Kaliningrad and FC Chkalovets Novosibirsk.

== Career statistics ==
=== Club ===
As of match played 16 March 2021

Club	Season	League			Cup		Continental		Total	
Club	Season	Division	Apps	Goals	Apps	Goals	Apps	Goals	Apps	Goals
Sheksna Cherepovets	2006	PFL	28	1	1	0	–		29	1
Sheksna Cherepovets	2007	PFL	14	1	1	0	–		15	1
Sheksna Cherepovets	Total		42	2	2	0	0	0	44	2
Spartak Moscow	2007	Russian Premier League	0	0	0	0	0	0	0	0
Spartak Moscow	2008	Russian Premier League	0	0	0	0	0	0	0	0
Spartak Moscow	2009	Russian Premier League	20	2	2	1	–		22	3
Spartak Moscow	2010	Russian Premier League	22	0	1	0	6	0	29	0
Spartak Moscow	2011–12	Russian Premier League	35	1	4	0	7	0	46	1
Spartak Moscow	2012–13	Russian Premier League	22	0	2	0	7	0	31	0
Spartak Moscow	2013–14	Russian Premier League	24	0	2	0	2	0	28	0
Spartak Moscow	2014–15	Russian Premier League	25	0	2	0	–		27	0
Spartak Moscow	2015–16	Russian Premier League	15	0	1	0	–		16	0
Spartak Moscow	2016–17	Russian Premier League	2	0	0	0	1	0	3	0
Spartak Moscow	Total		165	3	14	1	23	0	202	4
Spartak-2 Moscow	2014–15	PFL	1	0	–		–		1	0
Spartak-2 Moscow	2016–17	FNL	5	1	–		–		5	1
Spartak-2 Moscow	Total		6	1	0	0	0	0	6	1
Rostov	2017–18	Russian Premier League	16	0	2	0	–		18	0
Sochi	2018–19	FNL	7	0	0	0	–		7	0
Rotor Volgograd	2018–19	FNL	4	0	2	0	–		4	0
Ararat Yerevan	2019–20	Armenian Premier League	8	0	0	0	–		8	0
Metallurg Bekabad	2021	Uzbekistan Super League	2	0	0	0	–		2	0
Career total			250	6	18	1	23	0	291	7
