= Anatoli Ionov =

Soviet-Russian ice hockey player, coach, and team president (1939–2019)

- Born: May 23, 1939 Noginsk, Russian SFSR, USSR
- Died: May 12, 2019 (aged 79) Elektrostal, Russia
- Height: 5 ft 11 in (180 cm)
- Weight: 174 lb (79 kg; 12 st 6 lb)
- Position: Right wing
- Shot: Left
- Played for: Kristall Elektrostal; Krylya Sovetov Moscow; HC CSKA Moscow
- National team: Soviet Union
- Playing career: 1956–1973

Anatoli Ionov
Medal record

Men's ice hockey

Representing Soviet Union

Olympic Games
| Gold medal – first place | 1968 Grenoble | Team |

World Championships
| Gold medal – first place | 1965 Tampere | Team |
| Gold medal – first place | 1966 Ljubljana | Team |

Anatoli Semyonovich Ionov (Russian: Анатолий Семёнович Ионов; May 23, 1939 – May 12, 2019) was an ice hockey player who played in the Soviet Hockey League. He played for Kristall Elektrostal, Krylya Sovetov Moscow and HC CSKA Moscow. He was part of the Soviet Union team which won the gold medal at the 1968 Winter Olympics. He was inducted into the Russian and Soviet Hockey Hall of Fame in 1965. Following his playing career, he was coach, and later president, of Kristall Elektrostal.

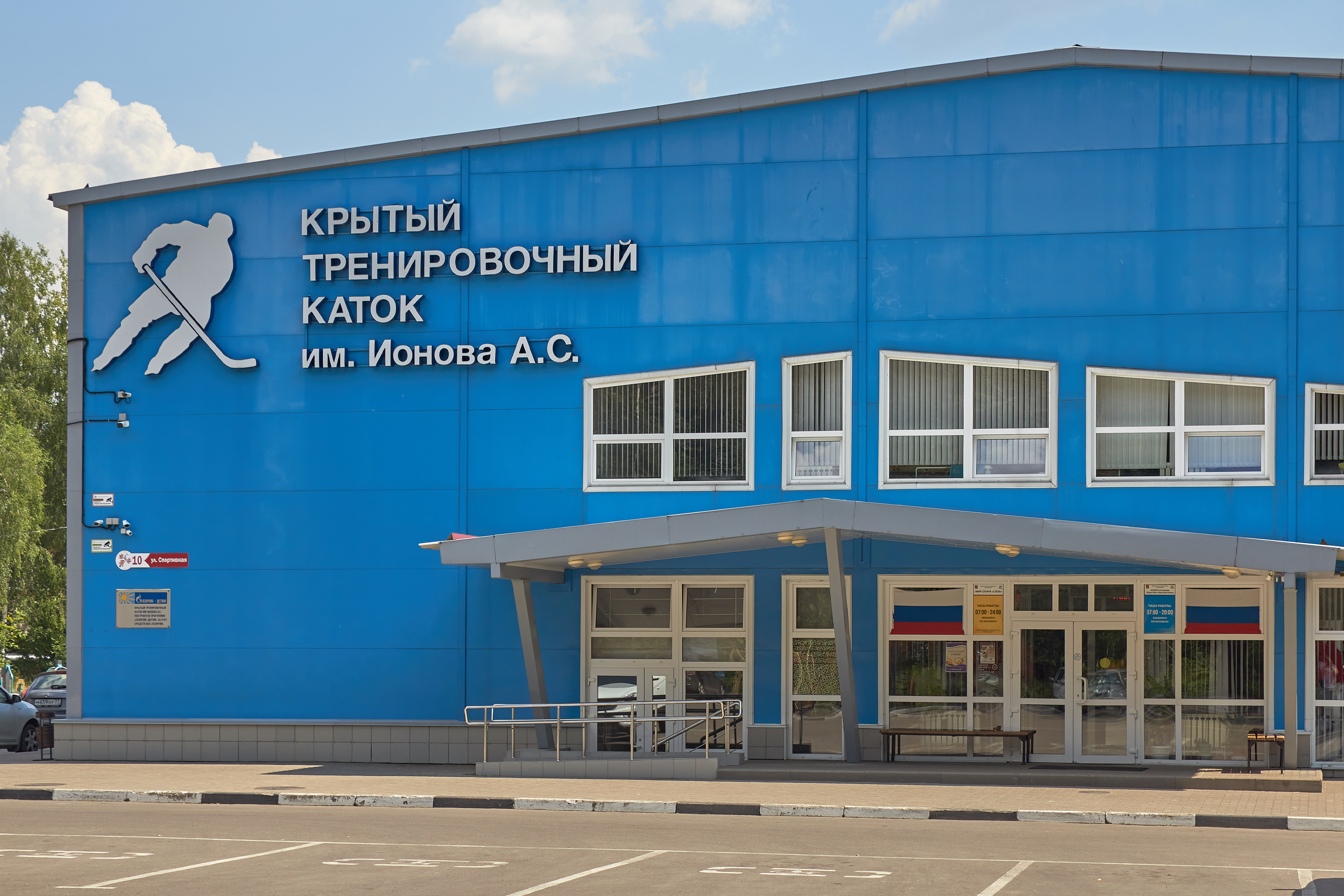
Indoor practice ice rink named after A.Ionov in the city Elektrostal.
