= Sergei Arekayev =

Russian ice hockey player (born 1978)

- Born: September 22, 1978 (age 47) Elektrostal, Russian SFSR, USSR
- Height: 6 ft 2 in (188 cm)
- Weight: 201 lb (91 kg; 14 st 5 lb)
- Position: Right wing
- Shot: Left
- Played for: RSL; HC Spartak Moscow; Ak Bars Kazan; Metallurg Magnitogorsk; Severstal Cherepovets; Mytishchi Khimik; Amur Khabarovsk; KHL; HC MVD; HC Neftekhimik Nizhnekamsk; Amur Khabarovsk
- NHL draft: Undrafted
- Playing career: 1997–2013

Sergei Stanislavovich Arekayev (Russian: Сергей Станиславович Арекаев; born September 22, 1978) is a Russian retired professional ice hockey player.

Arekayev played for seven seasons in the Russian Superleague with 6 different teams. Arekayev then played 98 games in the Kontinental Hockey League (KHL) with HC MVD, HC Neftekhimik Nizhnekamsk and Amur Khabarovsk.
