= Pavel Ivashentsev =

Russian footballer

Personal information
- Full name: Pavel Sergeyevich Ivashentsev
- Date of birth: 17 April 1988 (age 38)
- Height: 1.91 m (6 ft 3 in)
- Positions: Defender; midfielder

Youth career
- FC Rostov

Senior career*
Years	Team	Apps	(Gls)
2005–2006	FC Rostov	0	(0)
2006–2007	FC Taganrog	33	(6)
2008–2009	FC SKA Rostov-on-Don	27	(1)
2009	FC KAMAZ Naberezhnye Chelny	1	(0)
2010	FC Krylia Sovetov Samara	0	(0)
2011	FC Rostov-2018-Elektron Rostov-on-Don		
2013–2015	FC Rostov-2018-Elektron Rostov-on-Don		
- * Club domestic league appearances and goals

Pavel Sergeyevich Ivashentsev (Russian: Павел Серге́евич Ивашенцев; born 17 April 1988) is a former Russian professional football player.

== Club career ==
He played two seasons in the Russian Football National League for FC SKA Rostov-on-Don and FC KAMAZ Naberezhnye Chelny.
