= Roman Chernyshyov =

Russian footballer

Personal information
- Full name: Roman Aleksandrovich Chernyshyov
- Date of birth: 24 July 1987 (age 39)
- Place of birth: Ramenskoye, Russian SFSR
- Height: 1.78 m (5 ft 10 in)
- Position: Midfielder

Youth career
- 2004–2005: FC Saturn Moscow Oblast

Senior career*
Years	Team	Apps	(Gls)
2006	FC Oryol	20	(0)
2007	FC Sportakademklub Moscow	9	(1)
2008	FC Chernomorets Novorossiysk	0	(0)
2008	FC Istra	27	(0)
2009	FC Salyut-Energia Belgorod	0	(0)
2009	FC Sportakademklub Moscow	12	(11)
2010	FC Amkar Perm	0	(0)
2010	FC Sportakademklub Moscow	9	(1)
- * Club domestic league appearances and goals

Roman Aleksandrovich Chernyshyov (Russian: Роман Александрович Чернышёв; born 24 July 1987) is a former Russian professional football player.

== Club career ==
He made his Russian Football National League debut for FC Oryol on 1 April 2006 in a game against FC Salyut-Energiya Belgorod. That was his only season in the FNL.
