= Sergei Khripunkov =

Russian footballer

Personal information
- Full name: Sergei Vladimirovich Khripunkov
- Date of birth: 17 March 1982 (age 44)
- Place of birth: Lipetsk, Russian SFSR
- Height: 1.78 m (5 ft 10 in)
- Position: Midfielder

Team information
- Current team: FC Metallurg Lipetsk (manager)

Youth career
- FC Metallurg Lipetsk

Senior career*
Years	Team	Apps	(Gls)
2000–2002	FC Metallurg Lipetsk	16	(0)
2002	FC Spartak Tambov	10	(0)
2003	FC Sokol-Tsement Lipetsk		
2004	FC Neftyanik Nogliki		
2005–2006	FC Okean Nakhodka	52	(0)
2007	FC Metallurg Lipetsk	3	(0)
2007	FC Dynamo Voronezh	13	(1)
2008	FC Okean Nakhodka	23	(1)
2009	FC Mostovik-Primorye Ussuriysk (amateur)		
2010–2014	FC Metallurg Lipetsk	80	(3)

Managerial career
- 2025: FC Metallurg Lipetsk (reserves)
- 2025–: FC Metallurg Lipetsk
- * Club domestic league appearances and goals

Sergei Vladimirovich Khripunkov (Russian: Серге́й Владимирович Хрипунков; born 17 March 1982) is a Russian professional football coach and a former player who is the manager of FC Metallurg Lipetsk.

== Club career ==
He played in the Russian Football National League for FC Metallurg Lipetsk in 2000.
