= Aleksandr Tumenko =

Russian footballer

Personal information
- Full name: Aleksandr Vladimirovich Tumenko
- Date of birth: 15 July 1983 (age 43)
- Place of birth: Budapest, Hungary
- Height: 1.76 m (5 ft 9 in)
- Position: Midfielder

Youth career
- FC Spartak Moscow

Senior career*
| Years | Team | Apps | (Gls) |
| 2001 | FC Spartak Moscow | 0 | (0) |
| 2002 | FC Fakel-Voronezh Voronezh | 0 | (0) |
| 2002 | FC Mostransgaz Gazoprovod | 21 | (2) |
| 2003–2005 | FC Shinnik Yaroslavl | 4 | (0) |
| 2006–2008 | FC Baltika Kaliningrad | 113 | (8) |
| 2009 | FC MVD Rossii Moscow | 5 | (0) |
| 2010 | FC Petrovka 38 Moscow | | |
| 2013–2014 | FC Prialit Reutov | | |
| 2015 | FC Odintsovo | | |
- * Club domestic league appearances and goals

Aleksandr Vladimirovich Tumenko (Russian: Александр Владимирович Туменко; born 15 July 1983) is a Russian former professional footballer.

== Club career ==
He made his debut in the Russian Premier League in 2004 for FC Shinnik Yaroslavl.

== Personal life ==
He is the brother of Dmitri Tumenko.
