= Yevgeni Malkov =

Russian footballer

Personal information
- Full name: Yevgeni Yuryevich Malkov
- Date of birth: 12 July 1988 (age 38)
- Place of birth: Elektrostal, Soviet Union (now Russia)
- Height: 1.86 m (6 ft 1 in)
- Position: Defender

Youth career
- Vostok Elektrostal

Senior career*
Years	Team	Apps	(Gls)
2008–2010	FC Saturn Moscow Oblast	7	(0)
2010	→ FC Dynamo Saint Petersburg (loan)	12	(0)
2011	FC Saturn-2 Moscow Oblast	6	(1)
2011–2012	FC Vityaz Podolsk	16	(0)
2012–2013	FC Avangard Kursk	10	(0)
- * Club domestic league appearances and goals

Yevgeni Yuryevich Malkov (Russian: Евгений Юрьевич Мальков; born 12 July 1988) is a former Russian football player.

== Club career ==
He made his debut in the Russian Premier League in 2008 for FC Saturn Moscow Oblast.
