= Aleksandr Kozhevnikov (footballer) =

Russian footballer and official

Personal information
- Full name: Aleksandr Igorevich Kozhevnikov
- Date of birth: 18 April 1990 (age 36)
- Place of birth: Krasnoyarsk, Russian SFSR
- Height: 1.77 m (5 ft 9 1/2 in)
- Position: Defender

Team information
- Current team: FC Yenisey Krasnoyarsk (scout)

Youth career
- FC Spartak Moscow

Senior career*
Years	Team	Apps	(Gls)
2007–2010	FC Spartak Moscow	0	(0)
2010	FC Dynamo Bryansk	12	(0)
2011–2012	FC Yenisey Krasnoyarsk	2	(0)
2013	FC Smena Komsomolsk-na-Amure	8	(1)

Managerial career
- 2016–: FC Yenisey Krasnoyarsk (scout)
- * Club domestic league appearances and goals

Aleksandr Igorevich Kozhevnikov (Russian: Александр Игоревич Кожевников; born 18 April 1990) is a Russian professional football official and a former player. He is currently a scout with FC Yenisey Krasnoyarsk.

== Club career ==
He played two seasons in the Russian Football National League for FC Dynamo Bryansk and FC Yenisey Krasnoyarsk.
