= Konstantin Kadeyev =

Russian footballer

Personal information
- Full name: Konstantin Rashidovich Kadeyev
- Date of birth: 17 January 1989 (age 37)
- Place of birth: Moscow, Russian SFSR
- Height: 1.87 m (6 ft 1 1/2 in)
- Position: Defender

Youth career
- FC Spartak Moscow

Senior career*
| Years | Team | Apps | (Gls) |
| 2006–2010 | FC Spartak Moscow | 0 | (0) |
| 2010–2011 | FC Dynamo Bryansk | 15 | (2) |
| 2012 | FC Tyumen | 9 | (0) |
| 2013–2014 | FC Sever Murmansk | 24 | (2) |
| 2014 | FC Zhemchuzhina Yalta | 0 | (0) |
| 2015–2016 | FC Karelia Petrozavodsk | 22 | (3) |
- * Club domestic league appearances and goals

Konstantin Rashidovich Kadeyev (Russian: Константин Рашидович Кадеев; born 17 January 1989) is a former Russian professional football player.

== Club career ==
He made his Russian Football National League debut for FC Dynamo Bryansk on 10 August 2010 in a game against FC Krasnodar.
