= FC Metallurg Lipetsk =

Russian football club

Metallurg Lipetsk
- Full name: Футбольный клуб Металлург Липецк (Metallurg Lipetsk Football Club)
- Nicknames: Stalevary (Metallurgy); Krasno-Chernye (The Red-Blacks)
- Founded: 1957; 69 years ago
- Ground: Metallurg Stadium, Lipetsk
- Capacity: 11,000
- Chairman: Vadim Bannykh
- Manager: Sergei Khripunkov
- League: Russian Second League, Division B, Group 3
- 2026: 5th
- Website: fcmetallurg-lp.ru
Home colours	Away colours	Third colours

FC Metallurg Lipetsk (Russian: Футбольный клуб «Металлург» Липецк) is an association football club in Lipetsk, Russia, formed in 1957. Their home, Metallurg Stadium, is located on Pervomayskaya Street, 59, in Lipetsk.

== History ==
Their best result came in 1997 when they came 2nd in the Russian First Division.

Coach Stanislav Bernikov of Metallurg was attacked by fans after a defeat on 25 September 2006 on his players, they shot at the coach and team with rubber bullets. Three players suffered with injuries and went to hospital; the coach Bernikov was then summarily dismissed.

In 2008, they won the Russian Second Division in the Center Zone and were promoted for 2009 Russian First Division but relegated again to third level after finishing First Division as 19th.

On 10 June 2021, they secured first place in their PFL group and promotion to the second-tier Russian Football National League for the 2021–22 season, for the first time since 2009. The club was relegated back to the third tier after one season.

Colours are red and black hooped shirts, black shorts.

== Notable coaches ==
- Gennadi Styopushkin (2009)
- Soferbi Yeshugov (2007–2008)
- Aleksei Petrushin (2007)
- Stanislav Bernikov (2006)
- Anatoli Davydov (2002–2005)
- Vladimir Yevsyukov (2001)
- Vladimir Dergach (2000)
- Sergei Savchenkov (1999–2000)
- Vladimir Fedotov (1998)
- Yuri Shishlov (1998)
- Vladimir Alekseyevich Mikhaylov (1987–1989)
- Nikolay Kiselyov (1984–1985)

== Current squad ==
As of 11 September 2026, according to the Second League website.

Note: Flags indicate national team as defined under FIFA eligibility rules; some limited exceptions apply. Players may hold more than one non-FIFA nationality.

No.	Pos.	Nation	Player
1	GK	RUS	Nikita Yavorsky
3	DF	RUS	Ilya Korotkikh
5	MF	RUS	Dmitry Pavlov
8	MF	RUS	Dmitry Pakhomov
10	MF	RUS	Savva Potapov
12	DF	RUS	Vsevolod Smirnov
13	MF	RUS	Daniil Grigoryev
14	MF	RUS	Daniil Chernyakov
16	GK	RUS	Aleksandr Kobzev
22	MF	RUS	Ivan Sazonov
23	MF	RUS	Vladislav Agalakov
24	DF	RUS	Shota Chikhradze (on loan from Fakel Voronezh)

No.	Pos.	Nation	Player
25	FW	RUS	Sergey Gorbenko
27	MF	RUS	Matvey Ivashov
28	MF	RUS	Nikita Kononenko
29	MF	RUS	Ilnur Badrtdinov
31	MF	RUS	Zakhar Podzolkov
37	DF	RUS	Maksim Vedeneyev
48	FW	RUS	Roman Vedishchev
69	GK	RUS	Dmitry Bezborodov
70	DF	RUS	Aleksandr Danilov
76	DF	RUS	Yegor Ananyev
77	MF	RUS	Vartan Markaryan
92	FW	RUS	Aleksei Skvortsov

== Notable players ==
Had international caps for their respective countries. Players whose name is listed in bold represented their countries while playing for Metallurg.

Russia/USSR

- (Soviet Union) German Apukhtin
- (Russia) Andrei Chichkin
- (Russia) Yevgeni Dolgov
- (Soviet Union) Eduard Dubinski
- (Russia) Ilshat Faizulin
- (Russia) Sergei Filippenkov
- (Soviet Union) Yury Kovalyov
- (Soviet Union) Boris Razinsky
- (Soviet Union) (Commonwealth of Independent States) (Russia) Oleg Sergeyev
- (Russia) Igor Sklyarov

Former USSR countries

- (Belarus) Dzmitry Aharodnik
- (Belarus) Konstantin Kovalenko
- (Kazakhstan) Oleg Musin
- (Kazakhstan) Sergey Zhunenko
- (Latvia) **Aleksandrs Jeļisejevs**
- (Latvia) **Valentīns Lobaņovs**
- (Latvia) Mihails Ziziļevs
- (Lithuania) Tomas Kančelskis
- (Lithuania) **Saulius Mikalajūnas**
- (Lithuania) Audrius Šlekys
- (Lithuania) Tomas Žiukas
- (Tajikistan) Andrei Manannikov
- (Turkmenistan) Wýaçeslaw Krendelew
- (Uzbekistan) Sergey Lushan
