= Dmitri Tumenko =

Russian footballer

Personal information
- Full name: Dmitri Vladimirovich Tumenko
- Date of birth: 4 May 1989 (age 37)
- Place of birth: Moscow, Russian SFSR
- Height: 1.86 m (6 ft 1 in)
- Position: Midfielder

Youth career
- FC Spartak Moscow

Senior career*
Years	Team	Apps	(Gls)
2006	FC Spartak Moscow		
2007–2011	FC Spartak Moscow	0	(0)
2010	→ FC Dynamo Bryansk (loan)	11	(0)
2011–2012	FC Neftekhimik Nizhnekamsk	7	(1)
2013	FC Kvazar Moscow		
2014	FC Prialit Reutov		
- * Club domestic league appearances and goals

Dmitri Vladimirovich Tumenko (Russian: Дмитрий Владимирович Туменко; born 4 May 1989) is a former Russian professional football player.

== Club career ==
He played in the Russian Football National League for FC Dynamo Bryansk in 2010.

== Personal life ==
He is the younger brother of footballer Aleksandr Tumenko.
