= 2004 FC Spartak Moscow season =

Spartak Moscow
2004 season
- Manager: Nevio Scala (until 30 August); Aleksandrs Starkovs (from 30 August)
- Stadium: Luzhniki Stadium
- Premier League: 8th
- UEFA Cup: Third Round vs Mallorca
- Russian Cup: Round of 32 vs Metallurg Lipetsk
- UEFA Intertoto Cup: Third Round vs Villarreal
- Top goalscorer: League: Roman Pavlyuchenko (10); All: Roman Pavlyuchenko (13)

The 2004 FC Spartak Moscow season was the club's 13th season in the Russian Premier League season. Spartak finished the season in 8th position, and were knocked out of the 2004–05 Russian Cup by Metallurg Lipetsk at the Round of 32 stage. In Europe, Spartak where knockout of the 2003–04 UEFA Cup by Mallorca in the Third Round, whilst reaching the Third Round of the 2004 UEFA Intertoto Cup where they were knocked out by Villarreal.

== Season events ==
Prior to the start of the season, Yegor Titov was handed a 12-month ban from football for failing a drugs test after Russia's 0–0 against Wales on 15 November 2003.

On 30 August, Nevio Scala was sacked as manager of Spartak, with Aleksandrs Starkovs appointed as his replacement.

== Squad ==
As of match played 11 November 2004

No.	Name	Nationality	Position	Date of birth (age)	Signed from	Signed in	Contract ends	Apps.	Goals
Goalkeepers
1	Aleksei Solosin	(Russia)	GK	11 August 1987 (aged 17)	Youth Team	2004		0	0
30	Wojciech Kowalewski	(Poland)	GK	11 May 1977 (aged 27)	Shakhtar Donetsk	2003	2008	51	0
44	Aleksandr Nevokshonov	(Russia)	GK	29 December 1984 (aged 19)	Shinnik Yaroslavl	2003		0	0
46	Aleksei Zuev	(Russia)	GK	3 February 1981 (aged 23)	Spartak-Zvezda Shchyolkovo	2001			
Defenders
2	Yuri Kovtun	(Russia)	DF	5 January 1970 (aged 34)	Dynamo Moscow	1999	2005		
3	Ibra Kébé	(Senegal)	DF	24 December 1978 (aged 25)	ASC Jeanne d'Arc	2001			
5	Adrian Iencsi	(Romania)	DF	15 March 1975 (aged 29)	Rapid București	2004	2006	22	1
7	Dušan Petković	(Serbia and Montenegro)	DF	13 June 1974 (aged 30)	1. FC Nürnberg	2004	2006	19	3
15	Luc Zoa	(Cameroon)	DF	14 April 1986 (aged 18)	Orlando Pirates	2004	2007	3	0
17	Clemente Rodríguez	(Argentina)	DF	31 July 1981 (aged 23)	Boca Juniors	2004		9	0
18	Dmytro Parfenov	(Ukraine)	DF	11 September 1974 (aged 30)	Dnipro Dnipropetrovsk	1998	2005		
20	Ignas Dedura	(Lithuania)	DF	6 January 1978 (aged 26)	Skonto	2004		8	0
26	Nemanja Vidić	(Serbia and Montenegro)	DF	21 October 1981 (aged 23)	Red Star Belgrade	2004		13	2
29	Igor Mitreski	(North Macedonia)	DF	19 February 1979 (aged 25)	Sileks	2001			
31	Gabriel Tamaș	(Romania)	DF	5 November 1983 (aged 21)	Galatasaray	2004	2007	19	0
33	Martin Jiránek	(Czech Republic)	DF	25 May 1979 (aged 25)	Reggina	2004		12	0
43	Vadim Karlashchuk	(Russia)	DF	30 July 1984 (aged 20)	Shinnik Yaroslavl	2003		0	0
49	Roman Shishkin	(Russia)	DF	27 January 1987 (aged 17)	Youth Team	2004		7	0
Midfielders
4	Florin Șoavă	(Romania)	MF	24 July 1978 (aged 26)	Rapid București	2004	2008	34	1
6	Goran Trobok	(Serbia and Montenegro)	MF	6 September 1974 (aged 30)	Partizan	2003		49	1
8	Dmitri Alenichev	(Russia)	MF	20 December 1972 (aged 31)	Porto	2004		184	31
9	Yegor Titov	(Russia)	MF	29 May 1976 (aged 28)	Youth Team	1995		321	81
13	Srđan Stanić	(Serbia and Montenegro)	MF	7 June 1982 (aged 22)	OFK Beograd	2003	2007	14	1
14	Maksym Kalynychenko	(Ukraine)	MF	26 January 1979 (aged 25)	Dnipro Dnipropetrovsk	2000		113	17
25	Aleksandr Pavlenko	(Russia)	MF	20 January 1985 (aged 19)	Lausanne-Sport	2001		79	5
27	Serghei Covalciuc	(Moldova)	MF	20 January 1982 (aged 22)	Karpaty Lviv	2004		14	0
36	Vladimir Leshonok	(Russia)	MF	14 August 1984 (aged 20)	Shinnik Yaroslavl	2004		16	1
39	Aleksei Rebko	(Russia)	MF	23 April 1986 (aged 18)	Youth Team	2001		3	0
40	Aleksandr Samedov	(Russia)	MF	19 July 1984 (aged 20)	Youth Team	2001		45	8
41	Dmitri Torbinski	(Russia)	MF	28 April 1984 (aged 20)	Youth Team	2001		18	0
42	Oleg Dineyev	(Russia)	MF	30 October 1987 (aged 17)	Youth Team	2004			
45	Oleg Ivanov	(Russia)	MF	4 August 1986 (aged 18)	Youth Team	2002		5	0
47	Alexandru Gațcan	(Moldova)	MF	27 March 1984 (aged 20)	Unisport-Auto Chișinău	2004		0	0
	Marcelo Silva	(Brazil)	MF	25 May 1976 (aged 28)	Santos	2002	2004	5	0
Forwards
10	Roman Pavlyuchenko	(Russia)	FW	15 December 1981 (aged 22)	Rotor Volgograd	2003		67	27
28	Mihajlo Pjanović	(Serbia and Montenegro)	FW	13 February 1977 (aged 27)	Red Star Belgrade	2003	2007	31	11
32	Nikita Bazhenov	(Russia)	FW	1 February 1985 (aged 19)	Saturn Ramenskoye	2004		12	1
37	Tarmo Kink	(Estonia)	FW	6 October 1985 (aged 19)	Real Tallinn	2003		6	0
48	Nikolai Tyunin	(Russia)	FW	6 January 1987 (aged 17)	Youth Team	2004		0	0
50	Aleksandr Sonin	(Russia)	FW	6 August 1983 (aged 21)	Saint-Étienne	2001			
99	Fernando Cavenaghi	(Argentina)	FW	21 September 1983 (aged 21)	River Plate	2004		9	1
Away on loan
19	Aleš Urbánek	(Czech Republic)	MF	25 May 1980 (aged 24)	Sigma Olomouc	2004	2007	8	0
23	Pavel Pogrebnyak	(Russia)	FW	8 November 1983 (aged 21)	Youth Team	2002		24	5
26	Aleksandr Sheshukov	(Russia)	MF	15 April 1983 (aged 21)	Spartak Tambov	2002		5	0
34	Artem Kontsevoy	(Belarus)	FW	20 May 1983 (aged 21)	BATE Borisov	2003		10	2
	Sergei Kabanov	(Russia)	DF	15 March 1986 (aged 18)	Youth Team	2002		0	0
	Raman Vasilyuk	(Belarus)	FW	23 November 1978 (aged 25)	Slavia Mozyr	2001			
	Goran Maznov	(North Macedonia)	FW	22 April 1981 (aged 23)	Sloga Jugomagnat	2001			
Players that left Spartak Moscow during the season
8	Aleksandr Danishevsky	(Russia)	FW	23 February 1984 (aged 20)	Youth Team	2001			
11	Danijel Hrman	(Croatia)	MF	7 August 1975 (aged 29)	NK Varteks	2003	2005 (+1)	7	0
16	Giorgi Lomaia	(Georgia (country))	GK	8 August 1979 (aged 25)	Locomotive Tbilisi	2003		4	0
20	Marcelo Sosa	(Uruguay)	MF	2 June 1978 (aged 26)	Danubio	2004	2007	8	0
24	Nikolai Sokolov	(Russia)	FW	18 January 1983 (aged 21)	Lokomotiv Moscow	2003			
32	Mikhail Kostin	(Russia)	MF	10 March 1985 (aged 19)	Youth Team	2003		0	0
35	Kamalutdin Akhmedov	(Russia)	DF	14 April 1986 (aged 18)	Youth Team	2003		9	0

=== On loan ===
Note: Flags indicate national team as defined under FIFA eligibility rules; some limited exceptions apply. Players may hold more than one non-FIFA nationality.

No.	Pos.	Nation	Player
19	MF	CZE	Aleš Urbánek (at Sparta Prague)
23	FW	RUS	Pavel Pogrebnyak (at Khimki)
26	MF	RUS	Aleksandr Sheshukov (at Sokol Saratov)
34	FW	BLR	Artem Kontsevoy (at Chernomorets Novorossiysk)

No.	Pos.	Nation	Player
—	DF	RUS	Sergei Kabanov (at Dynamo Stavropol)
—	FW	BLR	Raman Vasilyuk (at Dynamo Brest)
—	FW	MKD	Goran Maznov (at Baltika Kaliningrad)

=== Left club during season ===
Note: Flags indicate national team as defined under FIFA eligibility rules; some limited exceptions apply. Players may hold more than one non-FIFA nationality.

No.	Pos.	Nation	Player
8	FW	RUS	Aleksandr Danishevsky (to Khimki)
11	MF	CRO	Danijel Hrman (to Dinamo Zagreb)
16	GK	GEO	Giorgi Lomaia (to Khimki)
20	MF	URU	Marcelo Sosa (to Atlético Madrid)

No.	Pos.	Nation	Player
24	FW	RUS	Nikolai Sokolov (to Baltika Kaliningrad)
32	MF	RUS	Mikhail Kostin (to Dynamo Stavropol)
35	DF	RUS	Kamalutdin Akhmedov (to Khimki)

== Transfers ==
=== In ===
Date	Position	Nationality	Name	From	Fee	Ref.
Winter 2004	MF	(Russia)	Vladimir Leshonok	Shinnik Yaroslavl	Undisclosed	
21 January 2004	DF	(Cameroon)	Luc Zoa	Orlando Pirates	Undisclosed	
21 January 2004	DF	(Serbia and Montenegro)	Dušan Petković	1. FC Nürnberg	Undisclosed	
13 February 2004	DF	(Romania)	Gabriel Tamaș	Galatasaray	Undisclosed	
24 February 2004	DF	(Romania)	Adrian Iencsi	Rapid București	Undisclosed	
24 February 2004	MF	(Uruguay)	Marcelo Sosa	Danubio	Undisclosed	
5 March 2004	MF	(Czech Republic)	Aleš Urbánek	Sigma Olomouc	Undisclosed	
11 March 2004	MF	(Romania)	Florin Șoavă	Rapid București	Undisclosed	
27 July 2004	DF	(Argentina)	Clemente Rodríguez	Boca Juniors	Undisclosed	
27 July 2004	FW	(Argentina)	Fernando Cavenaghi	River Plate	Undisclosed	
29 July 2004	FW	(Russia)	Nikita Bazhenov	Saturn Ramenskoye	Undisclosed	
31 August 2004	DF	(Lithuania)	Ignas Dedura	Skonto	Undisclosed	
Summer 2004	DF	(Czech Republic)	Martin Jiránek	Reggina	Undisclosed	
Summer 2004	DF	(Serbia and Montenegro)	Nemanja Vidić	Red Star Belgrade	Undisclosed	
Summer 2004	MF	(Moldova)	Serghei Covalciuc	Karpaty Lviv	Undisclosed	
Summer 2004	MF	(Moldova)	Alexandru Gațcan	Unisport-Auto Chișinău	Undisclosed	
Summer 2004	MF	(Russia)	Dmitri Alenichev	Porto	Undisclosed	

=== Out ===
Date	Position	Nationality	Name	To	Fee	Ref.
7 August 2004	MF	(Uruguay)	Marcelo Sosa	Atlético Madrid	Undisclosed	
Summer 2004	GK	(Georgia (country))	Giorgi Lomaia	Khimki	Undisclosed	
Summer 2004	DF	(Russia)	Kamalutdin Akhmedov	Khimki	Undisclosed	
Summer 2004	MF	(Croatia)	Danijel Hrman	Dinamo Zagreb	Undisclosed	
Summer 2004	MF	(Russia)	Mikhail Kostin	Dynamo Stavropol	Undisclosed	
Summer 2004	FW	(Russia)	Aleksandr Danishevsky	Khimki	Undisclosed	
Summer 2004	FW	(Russia)	Nikolai Sokolov	Baltika Kaliningrad	Undisclosed	

=== Loans out ===
Date from	Position	Nationality	Name	To	Date to	Ref.
Winter 2003	FW	(North Macedonia)	Goran Maznov	Baltika Kaliningrad	End of Season	
Winter 2004	MF	(Russia)	Aleksandr Sheshukov	Sokol Saratov	End of Season	
Winter 2004	FW	(Belarus)	Artem Kontsevoy	Chernomorets Novorossiysk	End of Season	
Summer 2004	DF	(Romania)	Gabriel Tamaș	Dinamo București	End of 2005 Season	
Summer 2004	DF	(Russia)	Sergei Kabanov	Dynamo Stavropol	End of Season	
Summer 2004	MF	(Czech Republic)	Aleš Urbánek	Sparta Prague	Summer 2005	
Summer 2004	FW	(Belarus)	Raman Vasilyuk	Dynamo Brest	End of Season	
Summer 2004	FW	(Russia)	Pavel Pogrebnyak	Khimki	End of Season	

=== Released ===
Date	Position	Nationality	Name	Joined	Date
31 December 2004	GK	(Russia)	Aleksandr Nevokshonov	SKA-Energia Khabarovsk	2006
31 December 2004	DF	(North Macedonia)	Igor Mitreski	Metalurh Zaporizhya	
31 December 2004	DF	(Russia)	Vadim Karlashchuk	Arsenal Kharkiv	
31 December 2004	DF	(Senegal)	Ibra Kébé	Alania Vladikavkaz	
31 December 2004	DF	(Serbia and Montenegro)	Dušan Petković	OFK Beograd	
31 December 2004	MF	(Moldova)	Alexandru Gațcan	Spartak Chelyabinsk	
31 December 2004	MF	(Russia)	Oleg Ivanov	Khimki	
31 December 2004	MF	(Serbia and Montenegro)	Srđan Stanić	Hajduk Kula	
31 December 2004	MF	(Serbia and Montenegro)	Goran Trobok	Shanghai Shenhua	
31 December 2004	MF	(Brazil)	Marcelo Silva	Goiás	24 February 2005
31 December 2004	FW	(Belarus)	Artem Kontsevoy	MTZ-RIPO Minsk	
31 December 2004	FW	(North Macedonia)	Goran Maznov	Rabotnički	
31 December 2004	FW	(Russia)	Aleksandr Sheshukov	Luch-Energiya Vladivostok	

== Competitions ==
=== UEFA Cup ===
26 February 2004 Third Round 1st leg	Spartak Moscow (Russia)	0 – 3	(Spain) Mallorca	Moscow, Russia
19:00 MSK (DST) (UTC+4)		Report	Eto'o 67'; Toni González 81'; Jesús Perera 85'	Stadium: Lokomotiv Stadium; Referee: Alon Yefet (Israel)

3 March 2004 Third Round 2nd leg	Mallorca (Spain)	0 – 1 (3 – 1 agg.)	(Russia) Spartak Moscow	Palma de Mallorca, Spain
23:00 MSK (DST) (UTC+4)		Report	Ivanov (yellow card) 13'; Samedov 44'; Mitreski (yellow card) 87'	Stadium: Son Moix; Referee: Stéphane Bré (France)

=== Premier League ===
==== Results by round ====
Round	1	2	3	4	5	6	7	8	9	10	11	12	13	14	15	16	17	18	19	20	21	22	23	24	25	26	27	28	29	30
Ground	H	A	H	A	H	A	H	A	H	A	H	A	H	A	H	A	H	A	H	A	H	A	H	A	H	A	H	A	H	A
Result	D	D	W	W	W	L	W	L	L	L	L	L	L	D	D	W	W	W	L	L	W	L	W	W	L	D	D	W	L	D

Updated to match(es) played on 11 November 2004. Source: See Results
A = Away; H = Home; W = Win; D = Draw; L = Loss

==== Results ====
13 March 2004 1	Spartak Moscow	2 – 2	Dynamo Moscow	Moscow
16:00 MSK (UTC+3)	Kalynychenko 34'; Tamaș (yellow card) 34'; Parfenov 42' (pen.)	Report	Dyatel 12'; Zbončák 51'	Stadium: Eduard Streltsov Stadium; Attendance: 12,000; Referee: Nikolai Ivanov

19 March 2004 2	Saturn Ramenskoye	2 – 2	Spartak Moscow	Ramenskoye
19:00 MSK (UTC+3)	Medvedev 52'; Onopko (yellow card) 65'; Petković 67' (o.g.)	Report	Pavlyuchenko (yellow card) 18'; Parfenov 21' (pen.); Sosa (yellow card) 25'; Petković (yellow card) 31' (goal) 88'; Pavlenko (yellow card) 59'	Stadium: Saturn Stadium; Attendance: 15,500; Referee: Sergey Fursa

28 March 2004 3	Spartak Moscow	3 – 2	FC Moscow	Moscow
15:00 MSK (DST) (UTC+4)	Parfenov 18' (pen.), 32' (pen.); Șoavă (yellow card) 58'; Pjanović (yellow card) 78'; Samedov 89'	Report	Bracamonte 1' (yellow card) 39'; Budunov (yellow card) 19' (goal) 83'	Stadium: Luzhniki Stadium; Attendance: 10,000; Referee: Igor Zakharov

3 April 2004 4	Rotor Volgograd	2 – 3	Spartak Moscow	Volgograd
16:30 MSK (DST) (UTC+4)	Krivov 5'; Trifonov (yellow card) 16'; Yesipov 45'	Report	Pjanović 13'; Tamaș (yellow card) 17'; Samedov 19'; Kalynychenko 24' (yellow card) 35'; Pavlenko (yellow card) 25'; Pogrebnyak (yellow card) 83'	Stadium: Central Stadium; Attendance: 14,000; Referee: Mikhail Semenov

7 April 2004 5	Spartak Moscow	1 – 0	Shinnik Yaroslavl	Moscow
19:00 MSK (DST) (UTC+4)	Tamaș (yellow card) 24'; Iencsi (yellow card) 58'; Pavlyuchenko 64' (pen.); Pjanović (yellow card) 90+'	Report	Gelson (yellow card) 35'; Lutsenko (yellow card) 45'; Grishin (yellow card) 71'; Dayev (yellow card) 74'	Stadium: Luzhniki Stadium; Attendance: 7,000; Referee: Stanislav Sukhina

11 April 2004 6	Torpedo Moscow	2 – 1	Spartak Moscow	Moscow
17:00 MSK (DST) (UTC+4)	Budylin 5' (pen.); Stepanov (yellow card) 77'; Panov 87'; Osipov (yellow card) 90'; Zyryanov (yellow card) 90+'	Report	Trobok (yellow card) 36'; Pjanović 40'; Iencsi (yellow card) 83'	Stadium: Luzhniki Stadium; Attendance: 21,000; Referee: Aleksandr Kolobaev

18 April 2004 7	Spartak Moscow	6 – 0	Amkar Perm	Moscow
16:00 MSK (DST) (UTC+4)	Tamaș (yellow card) 18'; Iencsi 21'; Samedov 31', 68', 71'; Sosa (yellow card) 31'; Trobok (yellow card) 36'; Mitreski (yellow card) 45'; Pogrebnyak 82'; Popov 87' (o.g.)	Report	Lavrik (yellow card) 30'; Khuzin (yellow card) 65'	Stadium: Luzhniki Stadium; Attendance: 8,500; Referee: Alexander Evstigneev

24 April 2004 8	Rubin Kazan	2 – 0	Spartak Moscow	Kazan
14:00 MSK (DST) (UTC+4)	Aloísio 15'; Dostálek (yellow card) 18'; Sharonov (yellow card) 20'; Konovalov 51' (yellow card) 80'	Report	Mitreski (yellow card) 12'; Sosa (yellow card) 82'	Stadium: Central Stadium; Attendance: 16,000; Referee: Nikolai Ivanov

1 May 2004 9	Spartak Moscow	0 – 3	Zenit St.Petersburg	Moscow
16:00 MSK (DST) (UTC+4)	Petković (yellow card) 39' (penalty missed) 85'; Iencsi (yellow card) 48'; Samedov (yellow card) 83'	Report	Kerzhakov 37'; Horshkov (yellow card) 43'; Spivak 49'; Šírl (yellow card) 55'; Arshavin 60' (yellow card) 83'	Stadium: Luzhniki Stadium; Attendance: 16,152; Referee: Sergey Timofeev

9 May 2004 10	Krylia Sovetov	4 – 2	Spartak Moscow	Samara
16:00 MSK (DST) (UTC+4)	Souza 3'; Karyaka 25', 73', 90'; Kowba (yellow card) 66'; Tetradze (yellow card) 76'	Report	Zoa (yellow card) 13'; Pavlyuchenko 19'; Pogrebnyak 65'; Iencsi (yellow card) 83'	Stadium: Metallurg Stadium; Attendance: 32,000; Referee: Sergey Fursa

15 May 2004 11	Spartak Moscow	0 – 2	CSKA Moscow	Moscow
16:00 MSK (DST) (UTC+4)	Tamaș (yellow card) 18'; Pogrebnyak (yellow card) 58'; Sosa (yellow card) 58'; Șoavă (yellow card) 63'; Samedov (yellow card) 65'	Report	Zoa 8' (o.g.); Olić (yellow card) 30' (goal) 77'; A.Berezutski (yellow card) 62'	Stadium: Luzhniki Stadium; Attendance: 18,500; Referee: Sergey Timofeev

19 May 2004 12	Rostov	3 – 1	Spartak Moscow	Rostov-on-Don
18:00 MSK (DST) (UTC+4)	Shirshov 12'; Akopyants 30'; Kalashnikov (yellow card) 90+'; Pérez 90+'	Report	Pavlyuchenko 42'; Zoa (yellow card) 66'; Iencsi (yellow card) 70'	Stadium: Olimp-2; Attendance: 9,500; Referee: Nikolai Ivanov

23 May 2004 13	Spartak Moscow	0 – 1	Alania Vladikavkaz	Moscow
16:00 MSK (DST) (UTC+4)	Șoavă (yellow card) 33'; Pogrebnyak (yellow card) 81'	Report	Karytska 28'; Varziyev (yellow card) 46'; Tudor (yellow card) 67'	Stadium: Luzhniki Stadium; Attendance: 5,000; Referee: Yuri Klyuchnikov

7 July 2004 14	Lokomotiv Moscow	0 – 0	Spartak Moscow	Moscow
MSK (DST) (UTC+4)	Gurenko (yellow card) 27'; Nizhegorodov (yellow card) 42'	Report	Mitreski (yellow card) 13'; Trobok (yellow card) 25'; Kovtun (yellow card) 50'; Vidić (yellow card) 52' (yellow-red card) 61'; Samedov (yellow card) 78'	Stadium: Lokomotiv Stadium; Attendance: 20,200; Referee: Sergey Lapochkin

7 July 2004 15	Spartak Moscow	1 – 1	Kuban Krasnodar	Moscow
15:00 MSK (DST) (UTC+4)	Petković 48'; Trobok (yellow card) 77'	Report	Vuka 48'; Kaleshin (yellow card) 79'	Stadium: Luzhniki Stadium; Attendance: 5,000; Referee: Alexander Evstigneev

11 July 2004 16	Alania Vladikavkaz	0 – 2	Spartak Moscow	Vladikavkaz
MSK (DST) (UTC+4)	Barasa (yellow card) 61'	Report	Șoavă 60'; Covalciuc (yellow card) 74'; Pavlyuchenko 90+'	Stadium: Republican Stadium; Attendance: 8,000; Referee: Aleksandr Gvardis

18 July 2004 17	Spartak Moscow	1 – 0	Rostov	Moscow
MSK (DST) (UTC+4)	Trobok (yellow card) 44'; Tamaș (yellow card) 49'; Șoavă (yellow card) 78'; Pavlyuchenko 90+'	Report	Coyle (yellow card) 69'	Stadium: Luzhniki Stadium; Attendance: 5,500; Referee: Sergei Marushko

24 July 2004 18	Kuban Krasnodar	1 – 2	Spartak Moscow	Krasnodar
MSK (DST) (UTC+4)	Gerasimov (yellow card) 24'; Matiola (yellow card) 49'; Vuka (yellow card) 56'; Baiano 75' (yellow card) 88'; Kornaukhov (yellow card) 79'	Report	Pavlyuchenko 9'; Tamaș (yellow card) 25'; Trobok 90+'	Stadium: Kuban Stadium; Attendance: 18,000; Referee: Yuri Klyuchnikov

14 August 2004 19	Spartak Moscow	1 – 3	Lokomotiv Moscow	Moscow
16:00 MSK (DST) (UTC+4)	Șoavă (yellow card) 57'; Pavlyuchenko 74'; Kovtun (yellow card) 88'	Report	Evseev (yellow card) 33'; Bilyaletdinov (yellow card) 36' (goal) 59', 76'; Sennikov (yellow card) 52'; Loskov (yellow card) 53'; Pimenov 79'; Asatiani (yellow card) 85'	Stadium: Luzhniki Stadium; Attendance: 12,000; Referee: Valentin Ivanov

21 August 2004 20	Zenit St.Petersburg	2 – 0	Spartak Moscow	Saint Petersburg
16:00 MSK (DST) (UTC+4)	Spivak 12' (pen.) (yellow card) 78'; Radimov 22' (yellow card) 24'; Vještica (yellow card) 83'; Arshavin (yellow card) 84'	Report	Kovtun (yellow card) 12'; Alenichev (yellow card) 35'; Pavlyuchenko (yellow card) 42'; Jiránek (yellow card) 45'; Vidić (yellow card) 56'; Pavlenko (yellow card) 61'	Stadium: Petrovsky Stadium; Attendance: 21,500; Referee: Vladimir Pettay

28 August 2004 21	Spartak Moscow	3 – 1	Krylia Sovetov	Moscow
16:00 MSK (DST) (UTC+4)	Pavlyuchenko 18'; Samedov 27'; Mitreski (yellow card) 31'; Bazhenov 45'	Report	Souza 10'	Stadium: Luzhniki Stadium; Attendance: 8,000; Referee: Stanislav Sukhina

10 September 2004 22	CSKA Moscow	2 – 1	Spartak Moscow	Moscow
19:00 MSK (DST) (UTC+4)	Jarošík 18' (yellow card) 90'; Gusev (yellow card) 53'; A.Berezutski (yellow card) 60'; Aldonin (yellow card) 65'; Olić 89'	Report	Kébé (yellow card) 28' (yellow-red card) 43'; Vidić 32' (yellow card) 90'; Pavlyuchenko (yellow card) 83'; Tamaș (yellow card) 90'	Stadium: Dynamo Stadium; Attendance: 19,000; Referee: Mikhail Khodyrev

20 September 2004 23	Spartak Moscow	2 – 0	Rubin Kazan	Moscow
MSK (DST) (UTC+4)	Pavlyuchenko 27' (pen.) (yellow card) 38'; Pjanović 89'	Report	Baýramow (yellow card) 84'	Stadium: Luzhniki Stadium; Attendance: 4,500; Referee: Yuri Kunitsa

26 September 2004 24	Amkar Perm	0 – 2	Spartak Moscow	Perm
19:00 MSK (DST) (UTC+4)	Sirakov (yellow card) 5'; Ziyati (yellow card) 47'; Kobenko (yellow card) 73'	Report	Samedov (yellow card) 6'; Dedura (yellow card) 18'; Alenichev 32' (pen.), 90+' (pen.); Mitreski (yellow card) 54'; Pjanović (yellow card) 87'	Stadium: Zvezda Stadium; Attendance: 18,500; Referee: Sergey Fursa

2 October 2004 25	Spartak Moscow	1 – 2	Torpedo Moscow	Moscow
16:00 MSK (DST) (UTC+4)	Iencsi (yellow card) 26'; Alenichev 72' (pen.)	Report	Panov (yellow card) 26'; Semshov 37', 57'; Budylin (penalty missed) 82'; Dancia (yellow card) 89'	Stadium: Luzhniki Stadium; Attendance: 10,000; Referee: Igor Zakharov

17 October 2004 26	Shinnik Yaroslavl	1 – 1	Spartak Moscow	Yaroslavl
18:00 MSK (DST) (UTC+4)	Jurić (yellow card) 2'; Spahić 23'; Starostyak (yellow card) 27'	Report	Pavlyuchenko 38'; Șoavă (yellow card) 51'	Stadium: Shinnik Stadium; Attendance: 17,500; Referee: Nikolai Ivanov

23 October 2004 27	Spartak Moscow	1 – 1	Rotor Volgograd	Moscow
16:00 MSK (DST) (UTC+4)	Pjanović 63'	Report	Yesipov (yellow card) 64' (goal) 82' (pen.); Zubko (yellow card) 70'; Trifonov (yellow card) 77'	Stadium: Luzhniki Stadium; Attendance: 5,500; Referee: Alexander Evstigneev

29 October 2004 28	FC Moscow	2 – 3	Spartak Moscow	Moscow
19:00 MSK (UTC+3)	Rebeja (yellow card) 32'; Bracamonte 36'; Kuzmin 62'; Ivanov (yellow card) 75'	Report	Vidić 44'; Samedov (yellow card) 45'; Pjanović (yellow card) 45+' (goal) 47'; Jiránek (yellow card) 53'; Cavenaghi 90+'	Stadium: Eduard Streltsov Stadium; Attendance: 5,000; Referee: Aleksandr Kolobaev

7 November 2004 29	Spartak Moscow	0 – 2	Saturn Ramenskoye	Moscow
MSK (UTC+3)	Pavlyuchenko (yellow card) 13'; Vidić (yellow card) 31'	Report	Montenegro 34'; Medvedev 48'	Stadium: Luzhniki Stadium; Attendance: 7,000; Referee: Yuri Klyuchnikov

11 November 2004 30	Dynamo Moscow	1 – 1	Spartak Moscow	Moscow
MSK (UTC+3)	Beschastnykh 14'; Tanasijević (yellow card) 57'; Batak (yellow card) 90'	Report	Pjanović 26'; Kovtun (yellow card) 43'; Rodríguez (yellow card) 62'; Dedura (yellow card) 83'	Stadium: Dynamo Stadium; Attendance: 14,500; Referee: Alexander Gonchar

==== League table ====
Pos	Team	Pld	W	D	L	GF	GA	GD	Pts
6	Shinnik Yaroslavl	30	12	8	10	29	29	0	44
7	Saturn	30	10	11	9	37	30	+7	41
8	Spartak Moscow	30	11	7	12	43	44	−1	40
9	FC Moscow	30	10	10	10	38	39	−1	40
10	Rubin Kazan	30	7	12	11	32	31	+1	33

Source: RSSSF
Rules for classification: 1st points; 2nd matches won; 3rd head-to-head (points, matches won, goal difference, goals scored, away goals scored); 4th goal difference

=== Russian Cup ===
==== 2004-05 ====
31 July 2004 Round of 32 1st leg	Spartak Moscow	0 – 2	Metallurg Lipetsk	Moscow
18:00 MSK (DST) (UTC+4)		Report	Petukhov 24'; Voydel (yellow card) 42'; Zhukovskiy 45'	Stadium: Luzhniki Stadium; Attendance: 3,000; Referee: Alexander Gonchar

10 August 2004 Round of 32 2nd leg	Metallurg Lipetsk	2 – 1 (3 – 1 agg.)	Spartak Moscow	Lipetsk
18:00 MSK (DST) (UTC+4)	Ivanov (yellow card) 17'; Zhukovskiy (yellow card) 45'; Nagibin 61' (yellow card) 61'	Report	Alenichev (yellow card) 45'; Pavlenko 58'	Stadium: Metallurg Stadium; Attendance: 15,000; Referee: Yury Kunitsa

=== UEFA Intertoto Cup ===
20 June 2004 First Round 1st leg	Spartak Moscow (Russia)	2 – 0	(Lithuania) Atlantas	Moscow, Russia
16:00 MSK (DST) (UTC+4)	Pogrebnyak 6' (pen.) (yellow card) 72'; Leshonok 34'; Kovtun (yellow card) 63'			Stadium: Luzhniki Stadium; Attendance: 2,000; Referee: Michael Svendsen (Denmark)

27 June 2004 First Round 2nd leg	Atlantas (Lithuania)	1 – 0 (1 – 2 agg.)	(Russia) Spartak Moscow	Klaipėda, Lithuania
18:00 MSK (DST) (UTC+4)	Navikas 80'		Kovtun (yellow card) 38'; Trobok (yellow card) 41'	Stadium: Klaipėdos centrinis stadionas Attendance: 3,200; Referee: Dejan Stanišić (Serbia and Montenegro)

3 July 2004 Second Round 1st leg	Spartak Moscow (Russia)	4 – 1	(Croatia) Kamen Ingrad	Moscow, Russia
14:00 MSK (DST) (UTC+4)	Samedov 34'; Petković (yellow card) 67' (goal) 82'; Pogrebnyak 77'; Pavlyuchenko 86' (pen.)		Šaranović 83'	Stadium: Luzhniki Stadium; Attendance: 4,000; Referee: Haim Jakov (Israel)

10 July 2004 Second Round 2nd leg	Kamen Ingrad (Croatia)	0 – 1 (1 – 5 agg.)	(Russia) Spartak Moscow	Velika, Croatia
20:00 MSK (DST) (UTC+4)			Pavlenko (yellow card) 33'; Pavlyuchenko (yellow card) 34'; Pogrebnyak 37'; Shishkin (yellow card) 56'	Stadium: Stadion Kamen Ingrad; Attendance: 2,500; Referee: Loizos Loizou (Cyprus)

17 July 2004 Third Round 1st leg	Villarreal (Spain)	1 – 0	(Russia) Spartak Moscow	Villarreal, Spain
23:00 MSK (DST) (UTC+4)	Battaglia (yellow card) 10'; Anderson 51'; Cazorla (yellow card) 86'; Víctor (yellow card) 87'		Samedov (yellow card) 28'; Kovtun (yellow card) 37'; Mitreski (yellow card) 38'	Stadium: Estadio El Madrigal; Attendance: 7,000; Referee: Matteo Trefoloni (Italy)

24 July 2004 Third Round 2nd leg	Spartak Moscow (Russia)	2 – 2 (2 – 3 agg.)	(Spain) Villarreal	Moscow, Russia
18:00 MSK (DST) (UTC+4)	Pavlyuchenko 11', 36'; Samedov (yellow card) 27'; Shishkin (yellow card) 69'; Akhmedov (yellow card) 87'		Anderson 33'; Roger 53'; Ballesteros (yellow card) 72'; Arruabarrena (yellow card) 78'	Stadium: Luzhniki Stadium; Attendance: 12,000; Referee: Craig Thomson (Scotland)

== Squad statistics ==
As of match played 11 November 2004

=== Appearances and goals ===
No.	Pos	Nat	Player	Total		Premier League		2004-05 Russian Cup		UEFA Cup		UEFA Intertoto Cup	
No.	Pos	Nat	Player	Apps	Goals	Apps	Goals	Apps	Goals	Apps	Goals	Apps	Goals
2	DF	(Russia) RUS	Yuri Kovtun	21	0	12+2	0	1	0	2	0	4	0
3	DF	(Senegal) SEN	Ibra Kébé	3	0	2	0	0	0	1	0	0	0
4	MF	(Romania) ROU	Florin Șoavă	34	1	26+1	1	1	0	0	0	5+1	0
5	DF	(Romania) ROU	Adrian Iencsi	22	1	16+1	1	1	0	0	0	4	0
6	MF	(Serbia and Montenegro) SCG	Goran Trobok	35	1	21+7	1	1	0	2	0	4	0
7	DF	(Serbia and Montenegro) SCG	Dušan Petković	19	3	10+2	2	1	0	2	0	4	1
8	MF	(Russia) RUS	Dmitri Alenichev	15	3	13	3	2	0	0	0	0	0
10	FW	(Russia) RUS	Roman Pavlyuchenko	33	13	22+4	10	2	0	0	0	5	3
13	MF	(Serbia and Montenegro) SCG	Srđan Stanić	1	0	0	0	0	0	0+1	0	0	0
14	MF	(Ukraine) UKR	Maksym Kalynychenko	20	2	10+3	2	0	0	2	0	4+1	0
15	DF	(Cameroon) CMR	Luc Zoa	3	0	3	0	0	0	0	0	0	0
17	DF	(Argentina) ARG	Clemente Rodríguez	9	0	9	0	0	0	0	0	0	0
18	DF	(Ukraine) UKR	Dmytro Parfenov	11	4	8+1	4	0	0	2	0	0	0
20	DF	(Lithuania) LTU	Ignas Dedura	8	0	8	0	0	0	0	0	0	0
25	MF	(Russia) RUS	Aleksandr Pavlenko	31	1	16+7	0	1+1	1	1	0	5	0
26	DF	(Serbia and Montenegro) SCG	Nemanja Vidić	13	2	12	2	1	0	0	0	0	0
27	MF	(Moldova) MDA	Serghei Covalciuc	14	0	7+4	0	0+2	0	0	0	1	0
28	FW	(Serbia and Montenegro) SCG	Mihajlo Pjanović	19	6	10+7	6	0	0	2	0	0	0
29	DF	(North Macedonia) MKD	Igor Mitreski	22	0	12+3	0	1	0	2	0	4	0
30	GK	(Poland) POL	Wojciech Kowalewski	35	0	28	0	1	0	0	0	6	0
32	FW	(Russia) RUS	Nikita Bazhenov	12	1	7+4	1	1	0	0	0	0	0
33	DF	(Czech Republic) CZE	Martin Jiránek	12	0	12	0	0	0	0	0	0	0
36	MF	(Russia) RUS	Vladimir Leshonok	16	1	0+10	0	1	0	0	0	1+4	1
37	FW	(Estonia) EST	Tarmo Kink	4	0	0	0	0+1	0	0+1	0	1+1	0
39	MF	(Russia) RUS	Aleksei Rebko	1	0	0	0	0	0	0	0	0+1	0
40	MF	(Russia) RUS	Aleksandr Samedov	37	8	28+1	6	1	0	2	1	5	1
41	MF	(Russia) RUS	Dmitri Torbinski	1	0	0	0	0+1	0	0	0	0	0
45	MF	(Russia) RUS	Oleg Ivanov	5	0	0+2	0	0	0	1+1	0	0+1	0
46	GK	(Russia) RUS	Aleksei Zuev	1	0	0	0	1	0	0	0	0	0
49	DF	(Russia) RUS	Roman Shishkin	7	0	1	0	1	0	0	0	3+2	0
99	FW	(Argentina) ARG	Fernando Cavenaghi	9	1	7+2	1	0	0	0	0	0	0
Players away from the club on loan:
19	MF	(Czech Republic) CZE	Aleš Urbánek	8	0	0+3	0	1	0	0	0	0+4	0
23	FW	(Russia) RUS	Pavel Pogrebnyak	22	5	7+9	2	0+1	0	0	0	4+1	3
31	DF	(Romania) ROU	Gabriel Tamaș	19	0	13+1	0	2	0	0	0	2+1	0
Players who appeared for Spartak Moscow but left during the season:
11	MF	(Croatia) CRO	Danijel Hrman	1	0	0	0	0	0	1	0	0	0
16	GK	(Georgia (country)) GEO	Giorgi Lomaia	4	0	2	0	0	0	2	0	0	0
20	MF	(Uruguay) URU	Marcelo Sosa	8	0	6+2	0	0	0	0	0	0	0
35	DF	(Russia) RUS	Kamalutdin Akhmedov	9	0	2+2	0	1	0	0	0	4	0

=== Goal scorers ===
Place	Position	Nation	Number	Name	Premier League	2004-05 Russian Cup	UEFA Cup	UEFA Intertoto Cup	Total
1	FW	(Russia)	10	Roman Pavlyuchenko	10	0	0	3	13
2	MF	(Russia)	40	Aleksandr Samedov	6	0	1	1	8
3	FW	(Serbia and Montenegro)	28	Mihajlo Pjanović	6	0	0	0	6
4	FW	(Russia)	23	Pavel Pogrebnyak	2	0	0	3	5
5	DF	(Ukraine)	18	Dmytro Parfenov	4	0	0	0	4
6	MF	(Russia)	8	Dmitri Alenichev	3	0	0	0	3
6	DF	(Serbia and Montenegro)	7	Dušan Petković	2	0	0	1	3
8	MF	(Ukraine)	14	Maksym Kalynychenko	2	0	0	0	2
8	DF	(Serbia and Montenegro)	26	Nemanja Vidić	2	0	0	0	2
10	DF	(Romania)	5	Adrian Iencsi	1	0	0	0	1
10	MF	(Romania)	4	Florin Șoavă	1	0	0	0	1
10	MF	(Serbia and Montenegro)	6	Goran Trobok	1	0	0	0	1
10	FW	(Russia)	32	Nikita Bazhenov	1	0	0	0	1
10	FW	(Argentina)	99	Fernando Cavenaghi	1	0	0	0	1
10	MF	(Russia)	25	Aleksandr Pavlenko	0	1	0	0	1
10	MF	(Russia)	36	Vladimir Leshonok	0	0	0	1	1
10				Own goal	1	0	0	0	1
TOTALS					43	1	1	9	54

=== Clean sheets ===
Place	Position	Nation	Number	Name	Premier League	2004-05 Russian Cup	UEFA Cup	UEFA Intertoto Cup	Total
1	GK	(Poland)	30	Wojciech Kowalewski	7	0	0	2	9
2	GK	(Georgia (country))	16	Giorgi Lomaia	0	0	1	0	1
TOTALS					7	0	1	2	10

=== Disciplinary record ===
Number	Nation	Position	Name	Premier League		2004-05 Russian Cup		UEFA Cup		UEFA Intertoto Cup		Total	
Number	Nation	Position	Name	Yellow card	Red card	Yellow card	Red card	Yellow card	Red card	Yellow card	Red card	Yellow card	Red card
2	(Russia)	DF	Yuri Kovtun	4	0	0	0	0	0	3	0	7	0
3	(Senegal)	DF	Ibra Kébé	2	1	0	0	0	0	0	0	2	1
4	(Romania)	MF	Florin Șoavă	6	0	0	0	0	0	0	0	6	0
5	(Romania)	DF	Adrian Iencsi	6	0	0	0	0	0	0	0	6	0
6	(Serbia and Montenegro)	MF	Goran Trobok	5	0	0	0	0	0	1	0	6	0
7	(Serbia and Montenegro)	DF	Dušan Petković	2	0	0	0	0	0	1	0	3	0
8	(Russia)	MF	Dmitri Alenichev	1	0	1	0	0	0	0	0	2	0
10	(Russia)	FW	Roman Pavlyuchenko	5	0	0	0	0	0	1	0	6	0
14	(Ukraine)	MF	Maksym Kalynychenko	1	0	0	0	0	0	0	0	1	0
15	(Cameroon)	DF	Luc Zoa	2	0	0	0	0	0	0	0	2	0
17	(Argentina)	DF	Clemente Rodríguez	1	0	0	0	0	0	0	0	1	0
20	(Lithuania)	DF	Ignas Dedura	2	0	0	0	0	0	0	0	2	0
25	(Russia)	MF	Aleksandr Pavlenko	3	0	0	0	0	0	1	0	4	0
26	(Serbia and Montenegro)	DF	Nemanja Vidić	5	1	0	0	0	0	0	0	5	1
27	(Moldova)	MF	Serghei Covalciuc	1	0	0	0	0	0	0	0	1	0
28	(Serbia and Montenegro)	FW	Mihajlo Pjanović	4	0	0	0	0	0	0	0	4	0
29	(North Macedonia)	DF	Igor Mitreski	5	0	0	0	1	0	1	0	7	0
33	(Czech Republic)	DF	Martin Jiránek	2	0	0	0	0	0	0	0	2	0
40	(Russia)	MF	Aleksandr Samedov	5	0	0	0	0	0	2	0	7	0
45	(Russia)	MF	Oleg Ivanov	0	0	0	0	1	0	0	0	1	0
49	(Russia)	DF	Roman Shishkin	0	0	0	0	0	0	2	0	2	0
Players away on loan:
23	(Russia)	FW	Pavel Pogrebnyak	3	0	0	0	0	0	1	0	4	0
31	(Romania)	DF	Gabriel Tamaș	8	0	0	0	0	0	0	0	8	0
Players who left Spartak Moscow season during the season:
20	(Uruguay)	MF	Marcelo Sosa	4	0	0	0	0	0	0	0	4	0
35	(Russia)	DF	Kamalutdin Akhmedov	0	0	0	0	0	0	1	0	1	0
Total				77	2	1	0	2	0	14	0	94	2
