= 2003 Commonwealth of Independent States Cup =

CIS Cup, Кубок Содружества 2003

Tournament details
- Host country: Russia
- Dates: 18–26 January 2003
- Teams: 16
- Venue: 2 (in 1 host city)

Final positions
- Champions: (Moldova) Sheriff Tiraspol (1st title)

Tournament statistics
- Matches played: 31
- Goals scored: 90 (2.9 per match)
- Top scorer(s): (Romania) Cristian Tudor (9 goals)

The 2003 Commonwealth of Independent States Cup was the eleventh edition of the competition between the champions of former republics of Soviet Union. It was won by Sheriff Tiraspol for the first time.

== Participants ==
Team	Qualification	Participation
(Russia) Lokomotiv Moscow	2002 Russian Premier League champions ^{1}	1st
(Ukraine) Shakhtar Donetsk	2001–02 Vyshcha Liha champions	2nd
(Belarus) BATE Borisov	2002 Belarusian Premier League champions	2nd
(Lithuania) FBK Kaunas	2002 A Lyga champions	5th
(Latvia) Skonto Riga	2002 Latvian Higher League champions	11th
(Estonia) Flora Tallinn	2002 Meistriliiga champions	4th
(Moldova) Sheriff Tiraspol	2001–02 Moldovan National Division champions	2nd
(Georgia (country)) Torpedo Kutaisi	2001–02 Umaglesi Liga champions	3rd
(Armenia) Pyunik Yerevan	2002 Armenian Premier League champions	4th
(Kazakhstan) Irtysh Pavlodar	2002 Kazakhstan Premier League champions	4th
(Uzbekistan) Pakhtakor Tashkent	2002 Uzbek League champions	2nd
(Tajikistan) Regar-TadAZ Tursunzoda	2002 Tajik League champions	3rd
(Turkmenistan) Şagadam Türkmenbaşy	2002 Ýokary Liga champions	1st
(Kyrgyzstan) SKA-PVO Bishkek	2002 Kyrgyzstan League champions	4th
Azerbaijan U21	Unofficial entry, not eligible to advance past group stage ^{2}	1st
Russia U19	Unofficial entry, not eligible to advance past group stage	4th

- ^{1} Lokomotiv Moscow were represented by reserve/youth players.
- ^{2} Azerbaijan U21 replaced Shamkir (2001–02 Azerbaijan champions) since Azerbaijan Premier League was suspended for 2002–03 season and all clubs were inactive, outside of occasional friendly matches. The team was also reinforced with a few overage players.

== Group stage ==
=== Group A ===
Team	Pld	W	D	L	GF	GA	GD	Pts
(Russia) Lokomotiv Moscow	3	2	1	0	7	2	+5	7
(Georgia (country)) Torpedo Kutaisi	3	2	1	0	6	2	+4	7
(Kazakhstan) Irtysh Pavlodar	3	1	0	2	2	3	−1	3
(Kyrgyzstan) SKA-PVO Bishkek	3	0	0	3	1	9	−8	0

==== Results ====
18 January 2003
19:00

Lokomotiv Moscow (Russia)	1 – 0	(Kazakhstan) Irtysh Pavlodar
Ovchinnikov 60'

Olympic Sport Complex, Moscow
Attendance: 2,000
Referee: Romāns Lajuks (Latvia)
18 January 2003
19:00

Torpedo Kutaisi (Georgia (country))	3 – 0	(Kyrgyzstan) SKA-PVO Bishkek
Ionanidze 34'; Khvadagiani 36'; Poroshyn 79'

Spartak Manege, Moscow
Attendance: 300
Referee: Valery Vyalichka (Belarus)

19 January 2003
19:00

Torpedo Kutaisi (Georgia (country))	2 – 2	(Russia) Lokomotiv Moscow
Ionanidze 13'; Asatiani 70'		Vučićević 41'; Mikuckis 80'

Olympic Sport Complex, Moscow
Attendance: 3,000
Referee: Serhiy Shebek (Ukraine)
19 January 2003
19:00

SKA-PVO Bishkek (Kyrgyzstan)	1 – 2	(Kazakhstan) Irtysh Pavlodar
Sardarov 72'		Kalabukhin 44', 45' (pen.)

Spartak Manege, Moscow
Attendance: 250
Referee: Vladimir Antonov (Moldova)

21 January 2003
19:00

Lokomotiv Moscow (Russia)	4 – 0	(Kyrgyzstan) SKA-PVO Bishkek
Sokolov 5'; Parks 51'; Ovchinnikov 87' (pen.), 90'

Olympic Sport Complex, Moscow
Attendance: 2,000
Referee: Valery Vyalichka (Belarus)
21 January 2003
19:00

Irtysh Pavlodar (Kazakhstan)	0 – 1	(Georgia (country)) Torpedo Kutaisi
		Didava 6'

Spartak Manege, Moscow
Attendance: 500
Referee: Stanislav Sukhina (Russia)

=== Group B ===
Team	Pld	W	D	L	GF	GA	GD	Pts
(Latvia) Skonto Riga	3	2	1	0	6	2	+4	7
(Belarus) BATE Borisov	3	1	2	0	4	2	+2	5
(Tajikistan) Regar-TadAZ Tursunzoda	3	1	0	2	3	6	−3	3
(Armenia) Pyunik Yerevan	3	0	1	2	3	6	−3	1

==== Results ====
18 January 2003
15:00

Skonto Riga (Latvia)	2 – 1	(Armenia) Pyunik Yerevan
Jeļisejevs 15', 60'		Minasyan 75' (pen.)

Olympic Sport Complex, Moscow
Attendance: 900
Referee: Viktor Kolpakov (Kyrgyzstan)
18 January 2003
15:00

Regar-TadAZ Tursunzoda (Tajikistan)	0 – 2	(Belarus) BATE Borisov
		Chumachenko 4'; Skripchenko 86'

Spartak Manege, Moscow
Attendance: 300
Referee: Paulius Malžinskas (Lithuania)

19 January 2003
15:00

BATE Borisov (Belarus)	1 – 1	(Latvia) Skonto Riga
Ryndzyuk 3'		Koļesņičenko 28'

Olympic Sport Complex, Moscow
Attendance: 400
Referee: Aleksandr Borisov (Kazakhstan)
19 January 2003
15:00

Pyunik Yerevan (Armenia)	1 – 3	(Tajikistan) Regar-TadAZ Tursunzoda
Manucharyan 52'		Khojayev 12'; Sotnikov 57'; Zubaydov 84'

Spartak Manege, Moscow
Attendance: 400
Referee: Hannes Kaasik (Estonia)

21 January 2003
15:00

Regar-TadAZ Tursunzoda (Tajikistan)	0 – 3	(Latvia) Skonto Riga
		Verpakovskis 8', 62'; Zemļinskis 69' (pen.)

Olympic Sport Complex, Moscow
Attendance: 500
Referee: Khagani Mamedov (Azerbaijan)
21 January 2003
15:00

Pyunik Yerevan (Armenia)	1 – 1	(Belarus) BATE Borisov
Manucharyan 15'		Ryndzyuk 28' (pen.)

Spartak Manege, Moscow
Attendance: 450
Referee: Allabergen Sapaev (Turkmenistan)

=== Group C ===
- Unofficial table

Team	Pld	W	D	L	GF	GA	GD	Pts
(Uzbekistan) Pakhtakor Tashkent	3	1	2	0	3	1	+2	5
(Lithuania) FBK Kaunas	3	1	2	0	3	2	+1	5
Azerbaijan U21	3	1	1	1	4	4	0	4
(Ukraine) Shakhtar Donetsk	3	0	1	2	2	5	−3	1

- Official table

Team	Pld	W	D	L	GF	GA	GD	Pts
(Uzbekistan) Pakhtakor Tashkent	2	1	1	0	2	0	+2	4
(Lithuania) FBK Kaunas	2	0	2	0	1	1	0	2
(Ukraine) Shakhtar Donetsk	2	0	1	1	1	3	−2	1

==== Results ====
18 January 2003
17:00

Shakhtar Donetsk (Ukraine)	0 – 2	(Uzbekistan) Pakhtakor Tashkent
		Bikmaev 90'; Qosimov 90+3'

Olympic Sport Complex, Moscow
Attendance: 1,500
Referee: Stanislav Sukhina (Russia)
18 January 2003
17:00

FBK Kaunas (Lithuania)	2 – 1	Azerbaijan U21
Bezykornovas 58' (pen.); Puotkalis 85'		Musayev 78'

Spartak Manege, Moscow
Attendance: 250
Referee: Merab Malaguradze (Georgia)

19 January 2003
17:00

Shakhtar Donetsk (Ukraine)	1 – 1	(Lithuania) FBK Kaunas
Popov 77'		Opic 66'

Olympic Sport Complex, Moscow
Attendance: 1,500
Referee: Valentin Ivanov (Russia)
19 January 2003
17:00

Azerbaijan U21	1 – 1	(Uzbekistan) Pakhtakor Tashkent
Gurbanov 65' (pen.)		Hamidullaev 35'

Spartak Manege, Moscow
Attendance: 150
Referee: Allabergen Sapaev (Turkmenistan)

21 January 2003
17:00

FBK Kaunas (Lithuania)	0 – 0	(Uzbekistan) Pakhtakor Tashkent

Olympic Sport Complex, Moscow
Attendance: 900
Referee: Aleksandr Borisov (Kazakhstan)
21 January 2003
17:00

Azerbaijan U21	2 – 1	(Ukraine) Shakhtar Donetsk
Gurbanov 21', 28' (pen.)		Brandão 7'

Spartak Manege, Moscow
Attendance: 400
Referee: Hannes Kaasik (Estonia)

=== Group D ===
- Unofficial table

Team	Pld	W	D	L	GF	GA	GD	Pts
(Moldova) Sheriff Tiraspol	3	2	1	0	14	4	+10	7
Russia U19	3	2	1	0	7	4	+3	7
(Estonia) Flora Tallinn	3	1	0	2	4	6	−2	3
(Turkmenistan) Şagadam Türkmenbaşy	3	0	0	3	1	12	−11	0

- Official table

Team	Pld	W	D	L	GF	GA	GD	Pts
(Moldova) Sheriff Tiraspol	2	2	0	0	11	1	+10	6
(Estonia) Flora Tallinn	2	1	0	1	3	4	−1	3
(Turkmenistan) Şagadam Türkmenbaşy	2	0	0	2	1	10	−9	0

==== Results ====
18 January 2003
13:00

Flora Tallinn (Estonia)	0 – 4	(Moldova) Sheriff Tiraspol
		Tudor 10', 17', 58'; Boreț 22'

Olympic Sport Complex, Moscow
Attendance: 290
Referee: Karen Nalbandyan (Armenia)
18 January 2003
13:00

Şagadam Türkmenbaşy (Turkmenistan)	0 – 2	Russia U19
		Lozhkin 34' (pen.); Korzh 70' (o.g.)

Spartak Manege, Moscow
Attendance: 200
Referee: Kiyomiddin Safarov (Tajikistan)

19 January 2003
13:00

Sheriff Tiraspol (Moldova)	7 – 1	(Turkmenistan) Şagadam Türkmenbaşy
Dadu 25', 45+1', 49'; Pațula 52'; Comleonoc 56'; Boreț 86'; Nesteruc 90+2'		Sadykow 45+2'

Olympic Sport Complex, Moscow
Attendance: 350
Referee: Khagani Mamedov (Azerbaijan)
19 January 2003
13:00

Russia U19	2 – 1	(Estonia) Flora Tallinn
Malakhovskiy 30'; Yanbayev 87'		Rooba 56'

Spartak Manege, Moscow
Attendance: 150
Referee: Rustam Saidov (Uzbekistan)

21 January 2003
13:00

Flora Tallinn (Estonia)	3 – 0	(Turkmenistan) Şagadam Türkmenbaşy
Hamre 15'; Rooba 54'; Novikov 75'

Olympic Sport Complex, Moscow
Attendance: 500
Referee: Merab Malaguradze (Georgia)
21 January 2003
13:00

Sheriff Tiraspol (Moldova)	3 – 3	Russia U19
Georgescu 42'; Tudor 48', 68' (pen.)		Denisov 34'; Vlasov 45'; Shevchenko 83'

Spartak Manege, Moscow
Attendance: 150
Referee: Rustam Saidov (Uzbekistan)

== Final rounds ==
Quarter-finals (22 Jan)
(Moldova)	Sheriff Tiraspol	3
(Lithuania)	FBK Kaunas	0
(Russia)	Lokomotiv Moscow	3
(Belarus)	BATE Borisov	1
(Latvia)	Skonto Riga	2
(Georgia (country))	Torpedo Kutaisi	0
(Uzbekistan)	Pakhtakor Tashkent	3
(Estonia)	Flora Tallinn	0

Semi-finals (24 Jan)
(Moldova)	Sheriff Tiraspol	1
(Russia)	Lokomotiv Moscow	0
(Latvia)	Skonto Riga (p)	2
(Uzbekistan)	Pakhtakor Tashkent	2

Final (26 Jan)
(Moldova)	Sheriff Tiraspol	2
(Latvia)	Skonto Riga	1

=== Quarterfinals ===
22 January 2003
13:00

Sheriff Tiraspol (Moldova)	3 – 0	(Lithuania) FBK Kaunas
Dadu 2'; Tudor 9', 33' (pen.)

Olympic Sport Complex, Moscow
Attendance: 800
Referee: Romāns Lajuks (Latvia)
22 January 2003
15:00

Skonto Riga (Latvia)	2 – 0	(Georgia (country)) Torpedo Kutaisi
Verpakovskis 37'; Morozs 65'

Olympic Sport Complex, Moscow
Attendance: 1,000
Referee: Valentin Ivanov (Russia)
22 January 2003
17:00

Pakhtakor Tashkent (Uzbekistan)	3 – 0	(Estonia) Flora Tallinn
Krokhmal 7', 38'; Djeparov 58'

Olympic Sport Complex, Moscow
Attendance: 500
Referee: Vladimir Antonov (Moldova)
22 January 2003
19:00

Lokomotiv Moscow (Russia)	3 – 1	(Belarus) BATE Borisov
Parks 33'; Sokolov 62'; Vučićević 83'		Byahanski 27'

Olympic Sport Complex, Moscow
Attendance: 2,000
Referee: Paulius Malžinskas (Lithuania)

=== Semifinals ===
24 January 2003
17:00

Skonto Riga (Latvia)	2 – 2	(Uzbekistan) Pakhtakor Tashkent
Jeļisejevs 52', 70'		Koshelev 16'; Krokhmal 80'
Penalties
Koļesņičenko (penalty scored); Verpakovskis (penalty missed); Blagonadeždins (penalty scored); Isakovs (penalty scored)	3 – 1	(penalty scored) Goçgulyýew; (penalty missed) Ashurmatov; (penalty missed) Koshelev; (penalty missed) Nesterov

Olympic Sport Complex, Moscow
Attendance: 1,000
Referee: Serhiy Shebek (Ukraine)
24 January 2003
19:00

Sheriff Tiraspol (Moldova)	1 – 0	(Russia) Lokomotiv Moscow
Tudor 52'

Olympic Sport Complex, Moscow
Attendance: 4,000
Referee: Karen Nalbandyan (Armenia)

=== Final ===
26 January 2003
13:00

Sheriff Tiraspol (Moldova)	2 – 1	(Latvia) Skonto Riga
Tudor 1'; Testemițanu 90'		Zemļinskis 34' (pen.)

Olympic Sport Complex, Moscow
Attendance: 2,500
Referee: Valentin Ivanov (Russia)

== Top scorers ==
Rank	Player	Team	Goals
1	(Romania) Cristian Tudor	(Moldova) Sheriff Tiraspol	9
2	(Moldova) Sergiu Dadu	(Moldova) Sheriff Tiraspol	4
2	(Latvia) Aleksandrs Jeļisejevs	(Latvia) Skonto Riga	4
4	(Latvia) Māris Verpakovskis	(Latvia) Skonto Riga	3
4	(Russia) Sergei Ovchinnikov	(Russia) Lokomotiv Moscow	3
4	(Ukraine) Aleksandr Krokhmal	(Uzbekistan) Pakhtakor Tashkent	3
4	(Azerbaijan) Gurban Gurbanov	Azerbaijan U21	3
