= Aleksandr Pavlenko (footballer, born 1985) =

Russian footballer and official

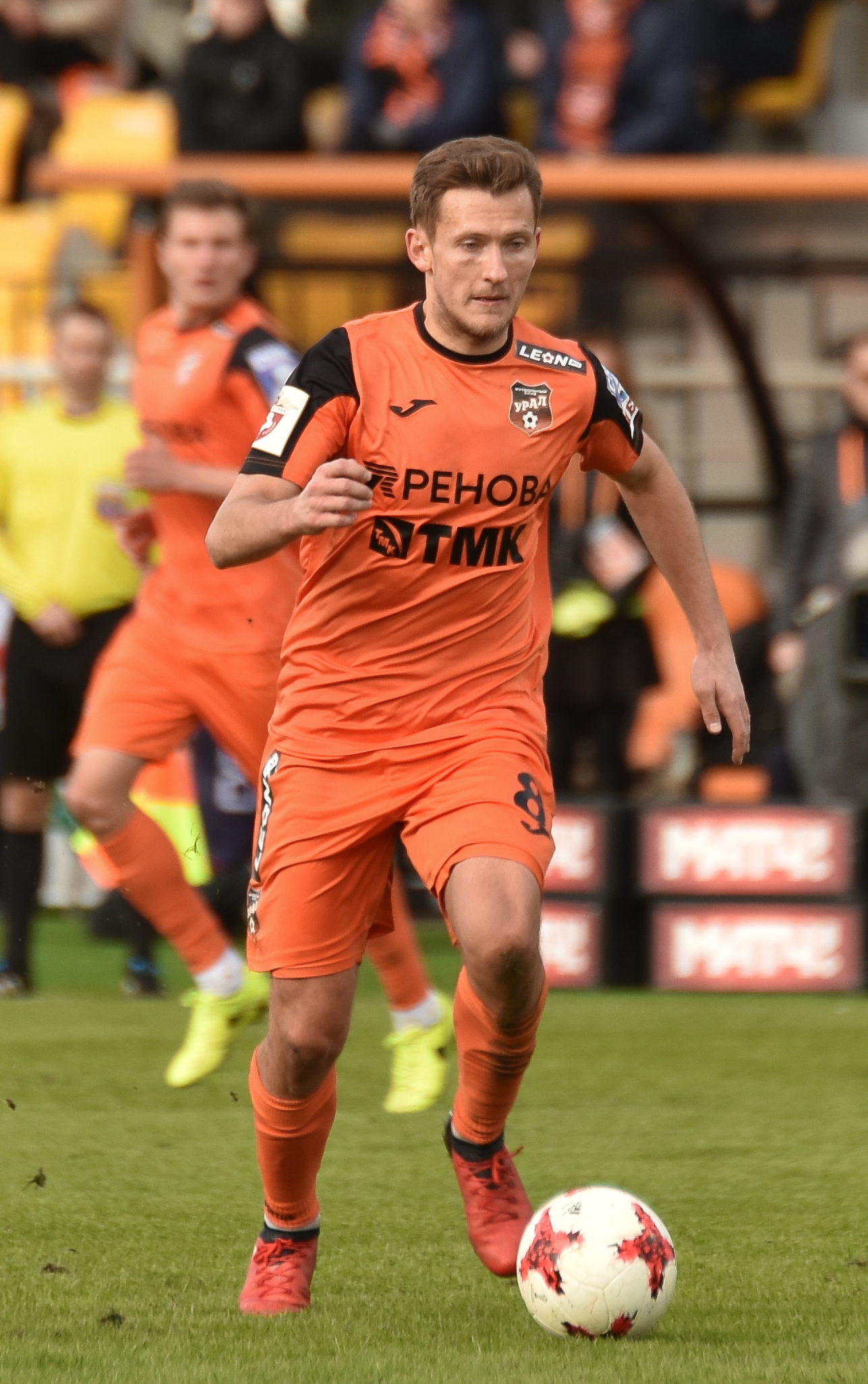
- Pavlenko with FC Ural Yekaterinburg in 2017

Personal information
- Full name: Aleksandr Yevgenyevich Pavlenko
- Date of birth: 20 January 1985 (age 41)
- Place of birth: Ordzhonikidze, Ukrainian SSR (now Ukraine)
- Height: 1.78 m (5 ft 10 in)
- Position: Attacking midfielder

Team information
- Current team: FC Rotor Volgograd (assistant coach)

Youth career
- 1993–1999: DYuSSh Ordzhonikidze
- 1999: FC Dynamo Moscow
- 2000: FC Sportakademklub Moscow
- 2001: FC Lausanne-Sport

Senior career*
Years	Team	Apps	(Gls)
2001–2010	FC Spartak Moscow	110	(11)
2007	→ FC Shinnik Yaroslavl (loan)	38	(7)
2009–2010	→ FC Rostov (loan)	33	(6)
2011–2013	FC Terek Grozny	41	(5)
2013–2014	FC Krylia Sovetov Samara	10	(1)
2014	FC Tosno	17	(3)
2015	FC Luch-Energiya Vladivostok	9	(1)
2015–2016	FC Shinnik Yaroslavl	26	(2)
2016–2017	FC Ural Yekaterinburg	19	(0)
2018	FC Tom Tomsk	11	(2)
2020	FC Rodina Moscow	2	(0)

International career
2003–2006	Russia U-21	21	(3)
2011	Russia-2	2	(0)

Managerial career
- 2018–2019: FC Anzhi Makhachkala (assistant)
- 2020–2024: FC Rodina Moscow (assistant)
- 2020: FC Rodina-2 Moscow
- 2024: FC Rodina-M Moscow
- 2025: FC Rodina-2 Moscow (assistant)
- 2025: FC Torpedo Moscow (assistant)
- 2025–: FC Rotor Volgograd (assistant)
- * Club domestic league appearances and goals

Aleksandr Yevgenyevich Pavlenko (Russian: Александр Евгеньевич Павленко; born 20 January 1985) is a Russian football coach and a former player who is an assistant coach with FC Rotor Volgograd.

== Career ==
Pavlenko started his career at the age of 14 in the youth academy of Dynamo Moscow before moving on to Academica Moscow and then the youth squad of FC Lausanne-Sport in Switzerland. In 2001, at the age of 16, he signed with Spartak Moscow and made his first team debut the same year. In 2002, he became a first team regular gaining his first opportunity to play in the UEFA Champions League.

He lost his regular place in the lineup in 2005 after injuries limited his playing time and consequently was loaned to Shinnik in 2007. He won Russian First Division player of the year accolade for his performances with Shinnik, and his team won promotion to the Premier League. After that, he has returned to Spartak and got back in the starting XI. He managed to beat a long-standing Spartak midfielder Egor Titov for the starting playmaker position at the start of 2008 season. However, in July Pavlenko was hospitalized with unspecified bladder problem. In March 2010 he was loaned until the end of the year to FC Rostov.

== Honours ==
- Russian Premier League champion (2001)
- Russian Cup winner (2003)
- Russian First Division champion (2007)
- Russian First Division player of the year (2007)

== Career statistics ==
As of 4 March 2018

Club	Season	League			Cup		Continental		Other		Total	
Club	Season	Division	Apps	Goals	Apps	Goals	Apps	Goals	Apps	Goals	Apps	Goals
Spartak Moscow	2001	Russian Premier League	5	0	0	0	1	0	–		6	0
Spartak Moscow	2002	Russian Premier League	5	0	2	0	4	0	–		11	0
Spartak Moscow	2003	Russian Premier League	21	2	5	0	4	2	–		30	4
Spartak Moscow	2004	Russian Premier League	23	0	2	1	6	0	1 (Note: One appearance in the Russian Super Cup)	0	32	1
Spartak Moscow	2005	Russian Premier League	14	2	1	0	–		–		15	2
Spartak Moscow	2006	Russian Premier League	12	1	4	2	0	0	–		16	3
Spartak Moscow	2007	Russian Premier League	0	0	1	0	0	0	1 (Note: One appearance in the Russian Super Cup)	0	2	0
Shinnik Yaroslavl	2007	FNL	38	7	1	0	–		–		39	7
Spartak Moscow	2008	Russian Premier League	20	6	1	0	7	1	–		28	7
Spartak Moscow	2009	Russian Premier League	10	0	1	0	–		–		11	0
Spartak Moscow	Total (2 spells)		110	11	17	3	22	3	2	0	151	17
Rostov	2009	Russian Premier League	9	3	–		–		–		9	3
Rostov	2010	Russian Premier League	24	3	2	2	–		–		26	5
Rostov	Total		33	6	2	2	0	0	0	0	35	8
Terek Grozny	2011–12	Russian Premier League	34	5	3	1	–		–		37	6
Terek Grozny	2012–13	Russian Premier League	7	0	2	0	–		–		9	0
Terek Grozny	Total		41	5	5	1	0	0	0	0	46	6
Krylia Sovetov Samara	2013–14	Russian Premier League	10	1	0	0	–		1 (Note: One appearance in relegation play-offs)	0	11	1
Tosno	2014–15	FNL	17	3	1	0	–		–		18	3
Luch-Energiya Vladivostok	2014–15	FNL	9	1	–		–		–		9	1
Shinnik Yaroslavl	2015–16	FNL	26	2	2	0	–		–		28	2
Shinnik Yaroslavl	Total (2 spells)		64	9	3	0	0	0	0	0	67	9
Ural Yekaterinburg	2016–17	Russian Premier League	19	0	2	0	–		–		21	0
Ural Yekaterinburg	2017–18	Russian Premier League	0	0	1	0	–		–		1	0
Ural Yekaterinburg	Total		19	0	3	0	0	0	0	0	22	0
Tom Tomsk	2017–18	FNL	1	0	–		–		–		1	0
Career total			304	36	31	6	22	3	3	0	360	45
