= 2007 in Russian football =

2007 season

The Russian Premier League schedule of competitions and cups from 2007.

== National team ==
| Date | Venue | Opponents | Score^{1} | Comp. | Russia scorers | Report |
|---|---|---|---|---|---|---|
| 8 February | Amsterdam ArenA, Amsterdam (A) | Netherlands | 1–4 | F | Vladimir Bystrov | soccernet |
| 24 March | A. Le Coq Arena, Tallinn (A) | Estonia | 2–0 | ECQ | Aleksandr Kerzhakov, Aleksandr Kerzhakov | uefa |
| 2 June | Petrovsky Stadium, Saint Petersburg (H) | Andorra | 4–0 | ECQ | Aleksandr Kerzhakov (3), Dmitri Sychev | uefa |
| 6 June | Maksimir Stadium, Zagreb (A) | Croatia | 0–0 | ECQ | | uefa |
| 22 August | Lokomotiv Stadium, Moscow (H) | Poland | 2–2 | F | Dmitri Sychev, Roman Pavlyuchenko | soccernet |
| 8 September | Lokomotiv Stadium, Moscow (H) | North Macedonia | 3–0 | ECQ | Vasili Berezutskiy, Andrei Arshavin, Aleksandr Kerzhakov | uefa |
| 12 September | Wembley Stadium, London (A) | England | 0–3 | ECQ | | uefa |
| 17 October | Luzhniki Stadium, Moscow (H) | England | 2–1 | ECQ | Roman Pavlyuchenko (2) | uefa |
| 17 November | Ramat Gan Stadium, Tel Aviv (A) | Israel | 1–2 | ECQ | Diniyar Bilyaletdinov | uefa |
| 21 November | Estadi Comunal, Andorra la Vella (A) | Andorra | 1–0 | ECQ | Dmitri Sychev | uefa |

1. Russia score given first

Key

- H = Home match
- A = Away match
- F = Friendly
- ECQ = UEFA Euro 2008 qualifier

== Leagues ==
=== Premier League ===
| Pos | Team | Pld | W | D | L | GF | GA | GD | Pts | Qualification or relegation |
|---|---|---|---|---|---|---|---|---|---|---|
| 1 | Zenit St. Petersburg (C) | 30 | 18 | 7 | 5 | 54 | 32 | +22 | 61 | Qualification to Champions League group stage |
| 2 | Spartak Moscow | 30 | 17 | 8 | 5 | 50 | 30 | +20 | 59 | Qualification to Champions League third qualifying round |
| 3 | CSKA Moscow | 30 | 14 | 11 | 5 | 43 | 24 | +19 | 53 | Qualification to UEFA Cup first round (Note: Qualified as the winner of 2007–08 Russian Cup) |
| 4 | FC Moscow | 30 | 15 | 7 | 8 | 40 | 32 | +8 | 52 | Qualification to UEFA Cup second qualifying round |
| 5 | Saturn | 30 | 11 | 12 | 7 | 34 | 28 | +6 | 45 | Qualification to Intertoto Cup second round |
| 6 | Dynamo Moscow | 30 | 11 | 8 | 11 | 37 | 35 | +2 | 41 | |
| 7 | Lokomotiv Moscow | 30 | 11 | 8 | 11 | 39 | 42 | −3 | 41 | |
| 8 | Amkar Perm | 30 | 10 | 11 | 9 | 30 | 27 | +3 | 41 | |
| 9 | Khimki | 30 | 9 | 10 | 11 | 32 | 33 | −1 | 37 | |
| 10 | Rubin Kazan | 30 | 10 | 5 | 15 | 31 | 39 | −8 | 35 | |
| 11 | Tom Tomsk | 30 | 8 | 11 | 11 | 37 | 35 | +2 | 35 | |
| 12 | Spartak Nalchik | 30 | 8 | 9 | 13 | 29 | 38 | −9 | 33 | |
| 13 | Krylia Sovetov Samara | 30 | 8 | 8 | 14 | 35 | 46 | −11 | 32 | |
| 14 | Luch-Energiya Vladivostok | 30 | 8 | 8 | 14 | 26 | 39 | −13 | 32 | |
| 15 | Kuban Krasnodar (R) | 30 | 7 | 11 | 12 | 27 | 38 | −11 | 32 | Relegation to First Division |
| 16 | Rostov (R) | 30 | 2 | 12 | 16 | 18 | 44 | −26 | 18 | Relegation to First Division |

Source: RFPL
Rules for classification: 1st points; 2nd matches won; 3rd goal difference; 4th head-to-head (points, matches won, goal difference, goals scored, away goals scored); 5th goals scored; 6th away goals scored; 7th drawing of lots
(C) Champions; (R) Relegated

=== First Division ===
| Pos | Team | Pld | W | D | L | GF | GA | GD | Pts | Promotion or relegation |
|---|---|---|---|---|---|---|---|---|---|---|
| 1 | Shinnik Yaroslavl (C, P) | 42 | 28 | 8 | 6 | 68 | 30 | +38 | 92 | Promotion to Premier League |
| 2 | Terek Grozny (P) | 42 | 28 | 6 | 8 | 69 | 27 | +42 | 90 | Promotion to Premier League |
| 3 | Sibir Novosibirsk | 42 | 25 | 11 | 6 | 80 | 39 | +41 | 86 | |
| 4 | KAMAZ | 42 | 23 | 8 | 11 | 67 | 34 | +33 | 77 | |
| 5 | Ural Sverdlovsk Oblast | 42 | 21 | 14 | 7 | 70 | 33 | +37 | 77 | |
| 6 | Torpedo Moscow | 42 | 21 | 6 | 15 | 75 | 59 | +16 | 69 | |
| 7 | Nosta Novotroitsk | 42 | 16 | 16 | 10 | 63 | 40 | +23 | 64 | |
| 8 | Dynamo Bryansk | 42 | 16 | 11 | 15 | 49 | 52 | −3 | 59 | |
| 9 | Salyut Belgorod | 42 | 17 | 6 | 19 | 44 | 45 | −1 | 57 | |
| 10 | Anzhi Makhachkala | 42 | 16 | 9 | 17 | 41 | 44 | −3 | 57 | |
| 11 | Zvezda Irkutsk | 42 | 16 | 8 | 18 | 60 | 47 | +13 | 56 | |
| 12 | Alania Vladikavkaz | 42 | 15 | 11 | 16 | 56 | 56 | 0 | 56 | |
| 13 | SKA-Khabarovsk | 42 | 14 | 14 | 14 | 50 | 48 | +2 | 56 | |
| 14 | Mashuk-KMV | 42 | 14 | 13 | 15 | 53 | 55 | −2 | 55 | |
| 15 | Baltika Kaliningrad | 42 | 14 | 12 | 16 | 53 | 49 | +4 | 54 | |
| 16 | Metallurg-Kuzbass | 42 | 15 | 8 | 19 | 53 | 70 | −17 | 53 | |
| 17 | SKA Rostov-on-Don | 42 | 14 | 11 | 17 | 50 | 60 | −10 | 53 | |
| 18 | Avangard Kursk (R) | 42 | 15 | 6 | 21 | 50 | 55 | −5 | 51 | Relegation to Second Division |
| 19 | Mordovia Saransk (R) | 42 | 13 | 4 | 25 | 44 | 88 | −44 | 43 | Relegation to Second Division |
| 20 | Tekstilshchik Ivanovo (R) | 42 | 10 | 8 | 24 | 38 | 68 | −30 | 38 | Relegation to Second Division |
| 21 | Sodovik Sterlitamak (R) | 42 | 8 | 10 | 24 | 32 | 65 | −33 | 34 | Relegation to Second Division |
| 22 | Spartak-MZhK Ryazan (R) | 42 | 1 | 4 | 37 | 21 | 101 | −80 | 7 | Relegation to Second Division |

Source: PFL, RSSSF
Rules for classification: 1) points; 2) goal difference; 3) number of goals scored.
(C) Champions; (P) Promoted; (R) Relegated
