= Goran Trobok =

Serbian footballer

Personal information
- Full name: Goran Trobok
- Date of birth: 6 September 1974 (age 52)
- Place of birth: Sarajevo, SFR Yugoslavia
- Height: 1.80 m (5 ft 11 in)
- Position: Defensive midfielder

Youth career
- Romanija Pale
- Sarajevo

Senior career*
Years	Team	Apps	(Gls)
1992	Petrovac	14	(0)
1993–1997	Budućnost Podgorica	117	(5)
1997–2003	Partizan	182	(18)
2003–2004	Spartak Moscow	35	(1)
2005	Shanghai Shenhua	24	(1)
2006	Shinnik Yaroslavl	0	(0)
2006	Budućnost Podgorica	10	(0)
2007	Smederevo	14	(0)
Total		396	(25)

International career
2000–2004	Serbia and Montenegro	10	(0)
2001	Serbia and Montenegro XI	5	(1)
- * Club domestic league appearances and goals

Goran Trobok (Serbian Cyrillic: Горан Тробок; born 6 September 1974) is a Serbian retired footballer who played as a defensive midfielder.

== Early life ==
A Bosnian Serb, Trobok was born in Pale, Bosnia and Herzegovina, but moved to Budva, Montenegro at the age of 17 with the onset of the Bosnian War.

== Club career ==
While playing for Budućnost Podgorica (1993–1997) and Partizan (1997–2003) in the First League of Serbia and Montenegro, Trobok became the most capped player in the competition's history. He also won three national championship titles and two national cups with the Crno-beli.

== International career ==
Between 2000 and 2004, Trobok made 10 official appearances for the Serbia and Montenegro national team (previously known as FR Yugoslavia). He also represented the nation at the Millennium Super Soccer Cup in India, winning the tournament (not officially recognized by FIFA).

== Career statistics ==
Appearances and goals by national team and year
National team	Year	Apps	Goals
FR Yugoslavia	2000	1	0
FR Yugoslavia	2001	2	0
FR Yugoslavia	2002	3	0
Serbia and Montenegro	2003	3	0
Serbia and Montenegro	2004	1	0
Total		10	0

== Honours ==
Partizan

- First League of FR Yugoslavia: 1998–99, 2001–02, 2002–03
- FR Yugoslavia Cup: 1997–98, 2000–01
