= Gelson (footballer, born 1979) =

Brazilian footballer

Personal information
- Full name: Geraldo dos Santos Júnior
- Date of birth: January 10, 1979 (age 47)
- Place of birth: Curitiba, Brazil
- Height: 1.84 m (6 ft 1/2 in)
- Position: Striker

Youth career
- Coritiba Foot Ball Club

Senior career*
| Years | Team | Apps | (Gls) |
| ?–2003 | Coritiba Foot Ball Club | | |
| 2004 | FC Shinnik Yaroslavl | 7 | (1) |
| 2004 | Coritiba Foot Ball Club | | |
| 2005 | Malmö FF | | |
| 2005–2007 | Académica de Coimbra | 34 | (4) |
| 2008 | Veria F.C. | 2 | (1) |
| 2009 | F.C. Aboomoslem | 11 | (2) |
| 2010–2011 | Shahrdari Tabriz | | |
- * Club domestic league appearances and goals

Geraldo dos Santos Júnior commonly known as Gelson (born January 10, 1979) is a former Brazilian footballer.

== Club career ==
He joined Aboomoslem in 2010 but could not help them to stay in the top division.

| Club performance | | | League | | Cup | | Continental | | Total | |
| Season | Club | League | Apps | Goals | Apps | Goals | Apps | Goals | Apps | Goals |
| Iran | | | League | | Hazfi Cup | | Asia | | Total | |
|---|---|---|---|---|---|---|---|---|---|---|
| 2009–10 | Aboomoslem | Persian Gulf Cup | 11 | 2 | | | - | - | | |
| Total | Iran | | 11 | 2 | | | 0 | 0 | | |
| Career total | | | 11 | 2 | | | 0 | 0 | | |

- Assist Goals

| Season | Team | Assists |
|---|---|---|
| 09/10 | Aboomoslem | 1 |
