= Aleksandr Krokhmal =

Turkmen-Kazakh footballer (born 1977)

Personal information
- Full name: Aleksandr Krokhmal
- Date of birth: 22 November 1977 (age 48)
- Place of birth: Ashgabat, Turkmen SSR, Soviet Union
- Height: 1.78 m (5 ft 10 in)
- Position: Forward

Senior career*
Years	Team	Apps	(Gls)
1997	Nisa Aşgabat		
1998	Dagdan Aşgabat		
1999–2003	Borysfen Boryspil	110	(17)
2001	→ Borysfen-2 Boryspil	4	(1)
2003	Pakhtakor Tashkent	16	(6)
2004–2006	Ordabasy	67	(24)
2006–2007	Zhetysu	33	(13)
2008	Megasport	22	(3)

International career^{‡}
2005	Kazakhstan	3	(0)
- * Club domestic league appearances and goals as of 17 December 2015 ‡ National team caps and goals as of 17 December 2015

Aleksandr Krokhmal (born 22 November 1977) is a Turkmenistani-Kazakhstani football striker of Ukrainian and Russian descent who played for the clubs Megasport, Pakhtakor, Borysfen, Ordabasy, Zhetysu.

Krokhmal played three games for the Kazakhstan national football team.

== Career statistics ==
=== International ===
Kazakhstan
Year	Apps	Goals
2005	3	0
Total	3	0
