= Sergei Ovchinnikov (footballer, born 1984) =

Russian footballer

Personal information
- Full name: Sergei Vladimirovich Ovchinnikov
- Date of birth: 7 December 1984 (age 41)
- Place of birth: Girey, Russia
- Height: 1.83 m (6 ft 0 in)
- Position: Forward

Senior career*
Years	Team	Apps	(Gls)
2001	FC Krasnodar-2000 Krasnodar	8	(0)
2002–2003	FC Lokomotiv Moscow	4	(0)
2003–2005	PFC Spartak Nalchik	78	(16)
2006	FC Krasnodar-2000 Krasnodar	11	(1)
2007	FC Mashuk-KMV Pyatigorsk	15	(0)
2007–2009	FC SKA-Energiya Khabarovsk	16	(3)
2009	PFC Spartak Nalchik	1	(0)
2010	FC Gornyak Uchaly	21	(6)
2011	FC Luch-Energiya Vladivostok	4	(0)
2012	FC Gornyak Uchaly	13	(1)
2014	Ulisses FC	14	(1)
- * Club domestic league appearances and goals

Sergei Vladimirovich Ovchinnikov (Russian: Серге́й Влади́мирович Овчи́нников, IPA: [sʲɪrˈɡʲej vlɐˈdʲimʲɪrəvʲɪtɕ ɐˈftɕinʲːɪkəf]; born 7 December 1984) is a Russian former professional footballer.

== Club career ==
He made his debut in the Russian Premier League in 2002 for FC Lokomotiv Moscow.

== Honours ==
- Russian Premier League champion: 2002.
