= Yuri Klyuchnikov (footballer) =

Russian footballer and referee

Personal information
- Full name: Yuri Ivanovich Klyuchnikov
- Date of birth: 20 April 1963 (age 63)
- Place of birth: Saratov, Russian SFSR
- Height: 1.85 m (6 ft 1 in)
- Position: Defender

Youth career
- FC Sokol Saratov

Senior career*
Years	Team	Apps	(Gls)
1981–1983	FC Sokol Saratov	78	(5)
1984–1985	FC SKA Rostov-on-Don	59	(1)
1986	FC Spartak Moscow	1	(0)
1986	FC Sokol Saratov	21	(3)
1987–1993	FC Rostselmash Rostov-on-Don	209	(1)
1993	KajHa Kajaani (Finland)	18	(3)
1994–1995	FC Rostselmash Rostov-on-Don	40	(0)
1995	FC Volgodonsk	8	(0)
1995	FC Istochnik Rostov-on-Don	9	(1)
- * Club domestic league appearances and goals

Yuri Ivanovich Klyuchnikov (Russian: Юрий Иванович Ключников; born 20 April 1963) is a former Russian professional football referee and a player. He made his professional debut in the Soviet Second League in 1982 for FC Sokol Saratov.

== Honours ==
- Soviet Top League bronze: 1986.
