= Cristian Tudor =

Romanian footballer

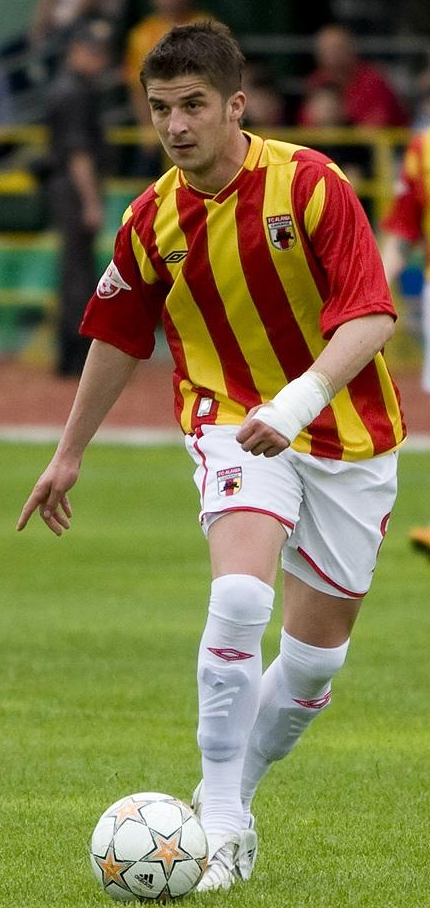

Personal information
- Full name: Cristian Dorin Tudor
- Date of birth: 23 August 1982
- Place of birth: Bistrița, Romania
- Date of death: 23 December 2012 (aged 30)
- Place of death: Bistrița, Romania
- Height: 1.89 m (6 ft 2 in)
- Position: Striker

Youth career
- 1997–1999: Gloria Bistrița

Senior career*
Years	Team	Apps	(Gls)
1999–2001	Gloria Bistrița	9	(1)
2000–2001	→ Pistoiese (loan)	15	(6)
2001–2003	Sheriff Tiraspol	28	(18)
2003–2008	Alania Vladikavkaz	54	(13)
2004–2006	→ FC Moscow (loan)	5	(0)
Total		111	(38)
- * Club domestic league appearances and goals as of N/A

Cristian Dorin Tudor (23 August 1982 – 23 December 2012) was a Romanian football striker.

He died of hepatic cirrhosis.

== Honours ==
=== Club ===
Sheriff Tiraspol

- Divizia Națională: 2001–02, 2002–03, 2003–04
- Moldovan Cup: 2002
- Moldovan Super Cup: 2003
- CIS Cup: 2003

=== Individual ===
- CIS Cup top goalscorer: 2003
