= Ilya Kalashnikov =

Russian footballer and manager

Personal information
- Full name: Ilya Yevgenyevich Kalashnikov
- Date of birth: 10 July 1982 (age 44)
- Place of birth: Petrozavodsk, Russian SFSR
- Height: 1.78 m (5 ft 10 in)
- Position: Midfielder

Youth career
- FC Rostselmash Rostov-on-Don

Senior career*
Years	Team	Apps	(Gls)
2002–2007	FC Rostov	49	(0)
2007–2008	FC SKA Rostov-on-Don	40	(2)
2009	FC Vityaz Podolsk	28	(0)
2010	FC Volgar-Gazprom Astrakhan	10	(0)
2010–2012	FC Salyut Belgorod	40	(0)
2012–2015	FC Zenit Penza	64	(2)
2015–2016	FC MITOS Novocherkassk	21	(1)
2017	FC Akademiya Futbola Rostov-on-Don	6	(0)

Managerial career
- 2018–2019: FC Akademiya Futbola Rostov-on-Don (assistant)
- 2019–2021: FC Rostov (academy)
- 2021–2022: FC Chayka-2 Peschanokopskoye (assistant)
- 2022: FC Chayka Peschanokopskoye (conditioning)
- 2022–2023: Alania Vladikavkaz (fitness)
- 2023: FC Akhmat Grozny (fitness)
- 2023–2026: FC Akron Tolyatti (assistant)
- * Club domestic league appearances and goals

Ilya Yevgenyevich Kalashnikov (Russian: Илья Евгеньевич Калашников; born 10 July 1982) is a Russian professional football manager and a former player.

== Club career ==
He made his debut in the Russian Premier League for FC Rostselmash Rostov-on-Don on 28 September 2002 in a game against FC Saturn Ramenskoye. He played in 5 RPL seasons for Rostov.

== Honours ==
- Russian Cup finalist: 2003.
