= Mikhail Kostin =

Russian footballer

Personal information
- Full name: Mikhail Igorevich Kostin
- Date of birth: 10 March 1985 (age 41)
- Place of birth: Voroshilovhrad, Ukrainian SSR
- Height: 1.80 m (5 ft 11 in)
- Position: Midfielder

Youth career
- 1999–2000: Zorya Luhansk
- 2001–2002: Spartak Moscow

Senior career*
Years	Team	Apps	(Gls)
2003–2004	Spartak Moscow	0	(0)
2004	Dynamo Stavropol	19	(11)
2005	Spartak Chelyabinsk	38	(5)
2006	Ditton Daugavpils	7	(0)
2006	Avangard Kursk	5	(0)
2007	Shinnik Yaroslavl	0	(0)
2008–2009	Metallurg Lipetsk	60	(10)
2010–2011	Dynamo Bryansk	38	(3)
2012	Belshina Bobruisk	11	(0)
2013	Metallurg Lipetsk	5	(2)
- * Club domestic league appearances and goals

Mikhail Igorevich Kostin (Russian: Михаил Игоревич Костин; born 10 March 1985) is a former Russian professional footballer.

== Club career ==
He played five seasons in the Russian Football National League for four clubs.
