= Kamalutdin Akhmedov =

Russian professional footballer

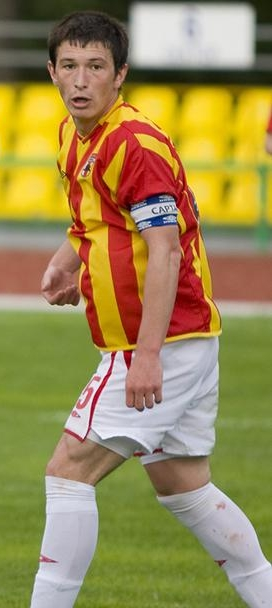
- Kamalutdin Akhmedov (2008)

Personal information
- Full name: Kamalutdin Magomedrasulovich Akhmedov
- Date of birth: 14 April 1986 (age 40)
- Place of birth: Makhachkala, Russian SFSR
- Height: 1.83 m (6 ft 0 in)
- Position: Defender

Youth career
- FC Spartak Moscow

Senior career*
Years	Team	Apps	(Gls)
2002–2004	FC Spartak Moscow	4	(0)
2004	FC Khimki	9	(0)
2005	FC Fakel Voronezh	21	(0)
2006–2009	FC Alania Vladikavkaz	86	(5)
2009	FC Khimki	4	(0)
2010–2016	FC Gazovik Orenburg	103	(12)
2016–2017	FC Tyumen	28	(1)
2019–2020	FC Lada Dimitrovgrad	0	(0)
- * Club domestic league appearances and goals

Kamalutdin Magomedrasulovich Akhmedov (Russian: Камалутдин Магомедрасулович Ахмедов; born 14 April 1986) is a Russian former professional footballer.

== Club career ==
He made his debut in the Russian Premier League in 2004 for FC Spartak Moscow. He played in 4 games in the UEFA Intertoto Cup 2004 for FC Spartak Moscow.

In July 2010 he was involved in a road accident, when the BMW car he was driving (allegedly without a valid driver license and under the influence of alcohol), collided with another car that was stopped at the red light. Four people in the other car were injured. He was arrested and charged with careless driving. His club FC Gazovik Orenburg issued a statement saying they will wait until all the legal issues are resolved before they make a decision about his contract.
