= Dušan Petković (footballer, born 1974) =

Serbian footballer

Personal information
- Full name: Dušan Petković
- Date of birth: 13 June 1974 (age 52)
- Place of birth: Belgrade, SR Serbia, SFR Yugoslavia
- Height: 1.89 m (6 ft 2 in)
- Position: Defender

Youth career
- OFK Beograd

Senior career*
Years	Team	Apps	(Gls)
1992–1995	OFK Beograd	26	(1)
1996	Mallorca	12	(0)
1996–1997	OFK Beograd	16	(3)
1997–1998	Yokohama Marinos	12	(2)
1999–2001	OFK Beograd	32	(4)
2000	→ Spartak Subotica (loan)	9	(1)
2001–2003	VfL Wolfsburg	4	(1)
2002–2003	→ 1. FC Nürnberg (loan)	22	(2)
2004	Spartak Moscow	12	(2)
2005–2006	OFK Beograd	5	(1)
2006–2007	Saturn Ramenskoye	10	(0)
Total		160	(17)

International career
1991	Yugoslavia U18 (Note: Official UEFA matches only)	1	(1)
2000–2004	FR Yugoslavia / Serbia and Montenegro	7	(0)
- * Club domestic league appearances and goals

Dušan Petković (Serbian Cyrillic: Душан Петковић; born 13 June 1974) is a Serbian retired footballer who played as a defender.

== Club career ==
After starting out in his homeland, Petković went on to play professionally in Spain (Mallorca), Japan (Yokohama Marinos), Germany (VfL Wolfsburg and 1. FC Nürnberg), and Russia (Spartak Moscow and Saturn Ramenskoye).

== International career ==
In 1991, Petković was capped for Yugoslavia at under-18 level.

Between 2000 and 2004, Petković was capped seven times for Serbia and Montenegro (previously known as FR Yugoslavia). He was additionally called up to Serbia and Montenegro's 2006 FIFA World Cup squad by manager Ilija Petković, as a replacement for the injured Mirko Vučinić, but withdrew from the roster following media criticism of the fact that it was his father who selected him.

== Personal life ==
Petković is the son of Ilija Petković.

In November 2022, Petković was arrested in Amsterdam, Netherlands as a member of an organized criminal group on charges of cocaine distribution.

== Career statistics ==
=== Club ===
Club	Season	League	
Club	Season	Apps	Goals
OFK Beograd	1991–92	1	0
OFK Beograd	1992–93	7	1
OFK Beograd	1993–94	2	0
OFK Beograd	1994–95	5	0
OFK Beograd	1995–96	11	0
OFK Beograd	Total	26	1
Mallorca	1995–96	12	0
OFK Beograd	1996–97	16	3
Yokohama Marinos	1997	11	2
Yokohama Marinos	1998	1	0
Yokohama Marinos	Total	12	2
OFK Beograd	1999–2000	8	2
OFK Beograd	2000–01	24	2
OFK Beograd	Total	32	4
Spartak Subotica (loan)	1999–2000	9	1
VfL Wolfsburg	2001–02	4	1
1. FC Nürnberg (loan)	2002–03	22	2
Spartak Moscow	2004	12	2
OFK Beograd	2005–06	5	1
Saturn Ramenskoye	2006	9	0
Saturn Ramenskoye	2007	1	0
Saturn Ramenskoye	Total	10	0
Career total		160	17

=== International ===
National team	Year	Apps	Goals
FR Yugoslavia	2000	1	0
FR Yugoslavia	2001	2	0
FR Yugoslavia	2002	0	0
Serbia and Montenegro	2003	0	0
Serbia and Montenegro	2004	4	0
Total		7	0

== Honours ==
Spartak Moscow

- Russian Super Cup runner-up: 2004

OFK Beograd

- Serbia and Montenegro Cup runner-up: 2005–06
