= Denis Zhukovskiy =

Russian footballer

Personal information
- Full name: Denis Yuryevich Zhukovskiy
- Date of birth: 19 July 1980 (age 46)
- Place of birth: Yelets, Lipetsk Oblast, Russian SFSR
- Height: 1.78 m (5 ft 10 in)
- Position: Striker

Senior career*
Years	Team	Apps	(Gls)
1999	FC Yelets (amateur)		
2000–2002	FC Yelets	100	(30)
2003–2005	FC Metallurg Lipetsk	117	(30)
2006	FC Salyut-Energia Belgorod	6	(0)
2006–2007	FC Metallurg Lipetsk	46	(27)
2008	FC Dynamo-Voronezh Voronezh	32	(13)
2009	FC Fakel-Voronezh Voronezh	18	(4)
2009	FC FSA Voronezh	9	(3)
2010	FC Sokol Saratov	11	(3)
- * Club domestic league appearances and goals

Denis Yuryevich Zhukovskiy (Russian: Денис Юрьевич Жуковский; born 19 July 1980) is a former Russian professional football player.

== Club career ==
A product of FC Yelets' youth system, Zhukovskiy began his professional career playing for the club in the Russian Second Division before joining local rivals FC Metallurg Lipetsk where he played in the Russian Football National League and Russian Second Division.

== Honours ==
- Russian Second Division Zone Center top scorer: 2007 (17 goals).
