= 2004 in Russian football =

2004 season

2004 in Russian football was marked with Lokomotiv's second championship, Terek's cup victory, and national team playing at Euro 2004.

== National team ==
Russia national football team participated in the final tournament of Euro 2004, where they finished last in group A. Later they started qualification for the 2006 FIFA World Cup. As of 2006, Russia's 1–7 defeat from Portugal in a qualifier is their worst result in history.

| Date | Venue | Opponents | Score^{1} | Competition | Russia scorers | Match Report |
|---|---|---|---|---|---|---|
| 31 March 2004 | Vasil Levski National Stadium, Sofia (A) | Bulgaria | 2–2 | F | Dmitry Sychev | Sport-Express |
| 28 April 2004 | Ullevaal Stadion, Oslo (A) | Norway | 2–3 | F | Vladislav Radimov, Dmitri Kirichenko | Sport-Express |
| 25 May 2004 | Arnold-Schwarzenegger-Stadion, Graz (A) | Austria | 0–0 | F | | Sport-Express |
| 12 June 2004 | Estádio Algarve, Faro/Loulé (N) | Spain | 0–1 | EC | | uefa |
| 16 June 2004 | Estádio da Luz, Lisbon (A) | Portugal | 0–2 | EC | | uefa |
| 20 June 2004 | Estádio Algarve, Faro/Loulé (N) | Greece | 2–1 | EC | Dmitri Kirichenko, Dmitri Bulykin | uefa |
| 18 August 2004 | Dynamo Stadium, Moscow (H) | Lithuania | 4–3 | F | Dmitri Khokhlov, Andrei Karyaka, Dmitri Bulykin, Dmitri Sychev | Sport-Express |
| 4 September 2004 | Dynamo Stadium, Moscow (H) | Slovakia | 1–1 | WCQ | Dmitri Bulykin | FIFA |
| 9 October 2004 | Stade Josy Barthel, Luxembourg (A) | Luxembourg | 4–0 | WCQ | Dmitri Sychev (3), Andrei Arshavin | FIFA |
| 13 October 2004 | Estádio José Alvalade, Lisbon (H) | Portugal | 1–7 | WCQ | Andrei Arshavin | FIFA |
| 17 November 2004 | Kuban Stadium, Krasnodar (H) | Estonia | 4–0 | WCQ | Andrei Karyaka, Marat Izmailov, Dmitri Sychev, Dmitri Loskov | FIFA |

1. Russia score given first

Key

- H = Home match
- A = Away match
- N = Neutral ground
- F = Friendly
- EC = 2004 European Football Championship, Group A
- WCQ = 2006 FIFA World Cup, European Qualifying, Group 3

== Leagues ==
=== Premier League ===
| Pos | Team | Pld | W | D | L | GF | GA | GD | Pts | Qualification or relegation |
|---|---|---|---|---|---|---|---|---|---|---|
| 1 | Lokomotiv Moscow (C) | 30 | 18 | 7 | 5 | 44 | 19 | +25 | 61 | Qualification to Champions League second qualifying round |
| 2 | CSKA Moscow | 30 | 17 | 9 | 4 | 53 | 22 | +31 | 60 | Qualification to UEFA Cup first round |
| 3 | Krylia Sovetov Samara | 30 | 17 | 5 | 8 | 50 | 41 | +9 | 56 | Qualification to UEFA Cup second qualifying round |
| 4 | Zenit St. Petersburg | 30 | 17 | 5 | 8 | 55 | 37 | +18 | 56 | Qualification to UEFA Cup second qualifying round |
| 5 | Torpedo Moscow | 30 | 16 | 6 | 8 | 53 | 37 | +16 | 54 | |
| 6 | Shinnik Yaroslavl | 30 | 12 | 8 | 10 | 29 | 29 | 0 | 44 | |
| 7 | Saturn | 30 | 10 | 11 | 9 | 37 | 30 | +7 | 41 | |
| 8 | Spartak Moscow | 30 | 11 | 7 | 12 | 43 | 44 | −1 | 40 | |
| 9 | FC Moscow | 30 | 10 | 10 | 10 | 38 | 39 | −1 | 40 | |
| 10 | Rubin Kazan | 30 | 7 | 12 | 11 | 32 | 31 | +1 | 33 | |
| 11 | Amkar Perm | 30 | 6 | 12 | 12 | 27 | 42 | −15 | 30 | |
| 12 | Rostov | 30 | 7 | 8 | 15 | 28 | 42 | −14 | 29 | |
| 13 | Dynamo Moscow | 30 | 6 | 11 | 13 | 27 | 38 | −11 | 29 | |
| 14 | Alania Vladikavkaz | 30 | 7 | 7 | 16 | 28 | 52 | −24 | 28 | |
| 15 | Kuban Krasnodar (R) | 30 | 6 | 10 | 14 | 26 | 42 | −16 | 28 | Relegation to First Division |
| 16 | Rotor Volgograd (R) | 30 | 4 | 10 | 16 | 28 | 53 | −25 | 22 | Relegation to First Division |

Source: RSSSF
Rules for classification: 1st points; 2nd matches won; 3rd head-to-head (points, matches won, goal difference, goals scored, away goals scored); 4th goal difference
(C) Champions; (R) Relegated

=== First Division ===
Terek Grozny and Tom Tomsk were promoted to the Premier League for the first time. Terek set a new record, scoring 100 points in a season.

| Pos | Team | Pld | W | D | L | GF | GA | GD | Pts | Promotion or relegation |
|---|---|---|---|---|---|---|---|---|---|---|
| 1 | Terek Grozny (C, P) | 42 | 32 | 4 | 6 | 70 | 22 | +48 | 100 | Promotion to Premier League |
| 2 | Tom Tomsk (P) | 42 | 27 | 5 | 10 | 70 | 38 | +32 | 86 | Promotion to Premier League |
| 3 | Sokol Saratov | 42 | 25 | 8 | 9 | 69 | 38 | +31 | 83 | |
| 4 | KAMAZ Naberezhnye Chelny | 42 | 19 | 12 | 11 | 52 | 49 | +3 | 69 | |
| 5 | Khimki | 42 | 17 | 10 | 15 | 39 | 33 | +6 | 61 | |
| 6 | Oryol | 42 | 16 | 13 | 13 | 37 | 34 | +3 | 61 (Note: Head-to-head record: Oryol – SKA 1–0, SKA – Oryol 0–2.) | |
| 7 | SKA-Khabarovsk | 42 | 16 | 13 | 13 | 42 | 37 | +5 | 61 | |
| 8 | Anzhi Makhachkala | 42 | 16 | 12 | 14 | 50 | 53 | −3 | 60 | |
| 9 | Metallurg Lipetsk | 42 | 15 | 15 | 12 | 48 | 43 | +5 | 60 | |
| 10 | Lokomotiv Chita | 42 | 17 | 8 | 17 | 47 | 48 | −1 | 59 | |
| 11 | Dynamo Makhachkala | 42 | 16 | 11 | 15 | 44 | 48 | −4 | 59 | |
| 12 | Spartak Nalchik | 42 | 16 | 10 | 16 | 53 | 46 | +7 | 58 | |
| 13 | Arsenal Tula (R) | 42 | 15 | 13 | 14 | 39 | 32 | +7 | 58 | Relegation to Second Division (Note: Arsenal Tula were relegated to Second Division because they didn't get a license for a next season.) |
| 14 | Luch-Energiya Vladivostok | 42 | 15 | 11 | 16 | 50 | 50 | 0 | 56 | |
| 15 | Dynamo Bryansk | 42 | 14 | 13 | 15 | 49 | 51 | −2 | 55 | |
| 16 | Metallurg-Kuzbass Novokuznetsk | 42 | 14 | 10 | 18 | 53 | 53 | 0 | 52 | |
| 17 | Chernomorets Novorossiysk (R) | 42 | 13 | 12 | 17 | 47 | 44 | +3 | 51 | Relegation to Amateur Football League (Note: Chernomorets Novorossiysk were relegated to Amateur Football League because they didn't get a license for a next season.) |
| 18 | Uralan Elista (R) | 42 | 13 | 11 | 18 | 48 | 57 | −9 | 50 | Relegation to Second Division |
| 19 | Neftekhimik Nizhnekamsk (R) | 42 | 11 | 12 | 19 | 38 | 57 | −19 | 45 | Relegation to Second Division |
| 20 | Baltika Kaliningrad (R) | 42 | 10 | 9 | 23 | 37 | 60 | −23 | 39 | Relegation to Second Division |
| 21 | Lisma-Mordovia Saransk (R) | 42 | 5 | 11 | 26 | 24 | 62 | −38 | 26 | Relegation to Second Division |
| 22 | SOYUZ-Gazprom Izhevsk (R) | 42 | 5 | 7 | 30 | 40 | 91 | −51 | 22 | Relegation to Second Division |

Source: PFL, RSSSF
Rules for classification: 1st points; 2nd matches won; 3rd head-to-head (points, matches won, goal difference, goals scored, away goals scored); 4th goal difference; 5th goals scored; 6th away goals scored
(C) Champions; (P) Promoted; (R) Relegated
Notes:

Andrey Fedkov of Terek became the top goalscorer with 38 goals.

=== Second Division ===
The following clubs have earned promotion by winning tournaments in their respective Second Division zones:

- FC Torpedo Vladimir (West)
- FC Fakel Voronezh (Centre)
- FC Dynamo Stavropol (South)
- FC Ural Sverdlovsk Oblast (Ural-Povolzhye)
- FC Chkalovets-1936 Novosibirsk (East)

Prior to start of the 2005 season three clubs (Rotor Volgograd, Torpedo Vladimir, and Arsenal Tula) refused participation in the First Division, and two more clubs (Dynamo Stavropol and Chernomorets Novorossiysk) were denied licences. This made way for the runners-up of all five zones:

- FC Petrotrest Saint Petersburg (West)
- FC Avangard Kursk (Centre)
- FC Volgar-Gazprom Astrakhan (South)
- FC Lukoil Chelyabinsk (Ural-Povolzhye)
- FC Amur Blagoveshchensk (East)

== Cups ==
The Russian Super Cup match between CSKA Moscow and Spartak Moscow was won by CSKA 3–1.

The Russian Cup was won by Terek Grozny, who beat Krylya Sovetov Samara in the final 1–0, with Andrey Fedkov scoring the only goal in the injury time. This was the first time the Cup was won by a team from the First Division.

== UEFA club competitions ==
=== 2003–04 UEFA Champions League ===
Lokomotiv Moscow qualified for the round of 16 of the 2003–04 UEFA Champions League, where they met AS Monaco. Lokomotiv won the home match 2–1, but lost on away goals after Monaco won the second leg 1–0.

=== 2003–04 UEFA Cup ===
Spartak Moscow qualified for the third round of the 2003–04 UEFA Cup, where they lost 3–1 on aggregate to RCD Mallorca.

=== 2004 UEFA Intertoto Cup ===
Spartak Moscow started in the first round of the UEFA Intertoto Cup 2004 and defeated FK Atlantas and NK Kamen Ingrad. Shinnik Yaroslavl started in the second round and defeated FK Teplice. Both Spartak and Shinnik were knocked out in the third round by Villarreal CF and UD Leiria, respectively.

=== 2004–05 UEFA Champions League ===
CSKA Moscow were the only Russian club to play in the 2004–05 UEFA Champions League. They started in the second qualifying round and reached the group stage by beating PFC Neftchi and Rangers F.C. In Group H, they finished third behind Chelsea F.C. and Futebol Clube do Porto but ahead of Paris Saint-Germain F.C. The third position allowed CSKA to qualify for the 2004–05 UEFA Cup, a competition they eventually won.

=== 2004–05 UEFA Cup ===
Terek Grozny (as the Russian Cup winners), Zenit Saint Petersburg and Rubin Kazan started in the second qualifying round of the 2004–05 UEFA Cup. Terek and Zenit qualified for the first round by defeating Lech Poznań and SV Pasching, respectively, while Rubin were knocked out by SK Rapid Wien. In the first round, Terek lost to FC Basel, and Zenit beat Red Star Belgrade and reached the group stage. In the group with Lille OSC, Sevilla FC, Alemannia Aachen, and AEK Athens, Zenit finished fourth and were eliminated.
