= Mario Jurić (footballer) =

Bosnian-Herzegovinian football player (born 1976)

Personal information
- Date of birth: 7 August 1976 (age 50)
- Place of birth: Odžak, SR Bosnia and Herzegovina, SFR Yugoslavia
- Height: 1.83 m (6 ft 0 in)
- Position: Attacking midfielder

Youth career
- 1985-1992: NK Odžak 102

Senior career*
Years	Team	Apps	(Gls)
1992–1995	Vrapče		
1995–1998	Inker Zaprešić		
1998–1999	Šibenik	14	(4)
1999–2004	Dinamo Zagreb	102	(9)
2004–2006	Shinnik Yaroslavl	57	(0)
2006–2007	Spartak Nalchik	6	(1)
2007–2007	Šibenik	12	(2)
2007–2010	Slaven Belupo	96	(12)
2011	Istra Pula	5	(0)

International career
2008	Bosnia and Herzegovina	2	(0)
- * Club domestic league appearances and goals

Mario Jurić (born 7 August 1976) is a Bosnian-Herzegovinian former football player.

== Club career ==
He last played for NK Istra 1961 and retired in 2011 after leaving the club. He played as an offensive midfielder.

== International career ==
He was also called up for the Bosnia and Herzegovina national football team by the head coach Blaž Slišković and Miroslav Blažević in 2008 and made his debut for them in an August 2008 friendly match against Bulgaria. He came on as a second-half substitute for team captain Emir Spahić, but was himself substituted 25 minutes later because of the injury. His second national team appearance was against Belgium.

== Honours ==
Individual

Best player (FC Shinnik Yaroslavl): 2004, 2005.
Won 1.HNL with NK Dinamo Zagreb in 2000. and 2003.
Won Croatian Cup with NK Dinamo Zagreb in 2001. and 2002.
Won Croatian Supercup with NK Dinamo Zagreb in 2002. and 2003.
