= Nikolai Sokolov (footballer, born 1983) =

Russian footballer

Personal information
- Full name: Nikolai Alekseyevich Sokolov
- Date of birth: 18 January 1983 (age 43)
- Place of birth: Tambov, Russian SFSR
- Height: 1.78 m (5 ft 10 in)
- Positions: Forward; midfielder

Youth career
- Molenbeek

Senior career*
| Years | Team | Apps | (Gls) |
| 2000–2001 | Anderlecht | 0 | (0) |
| 2001 | FC Spartak-Orekhovo Orekhovo-Zuyevo | 16 | (3) |
| 2001 | FC Spartak Moscow | 0 | (0) |
| 2002–2003 | FC Lokomotiv Moscow | 0 | (0) |
| 2003–2004 | FC Spartak Moscow | 0 | (0) |
| 2004 | FC Baltika Kaliningrad | 34 | (4) |
| 2005 | FC Khimki | 0 | (0) |
| 2005 | FC Baltika Kaliningrad | 10 | (0) |
| 2006–2007 | FC Ryazan | 42 | (12) |
| 2007 | FC SOYUZ-Gazprom Izhevsk | 6 | (0) |
| 2008 | FC Istra | 13 | (0) |
- * Club domestic league appearances and goals

Nikolai Alekseyevich Sokolov (Russian: Николай Алексеевич Соколов; born 18 January 1983) is a former Russian professional footballer.

== Club career ==
He made his debut for FC Lokomotiv Moscow on 29 March 2003 in a Russian Premier League Cup game against FC Torpedo-Metallurg Moscow and he also appeared in the return leg of the matchup.

He played in the Russian Football National League for FC Baltika Kaliningrad in 2004.
