= 2007–08 Russian Cup =

Tournament details
- Country: Russia

Final positions
- Champions: CSKA Moscow
- Runners-up: Amkar Perm

The 2007–08 Russian Cup was the sixteenth season of the Russian football knockout tournament since the dissolution of Soviet Union. The competition started on 18 April 2007 and finished with the final held on 17 May 2008.

== First round ==
This round featured four Second Division teams and four amateur teams. The games were played on 18 April 2007.

=== Section West ===
Team 1	Score	Team 2
FC Zelenograd (III)	1–0	Kooperator Vichuga (IV)
Maccabi Moscow (IV)	0–3	FC Smolensk (III)

=== Section Center ===
Team 1	Score	Team 2
Znamya Truda Orekhovo-Zuyevo (III)	1–2	Zorky Krasnogorsk (IV)
Saturn Yegoryevsk (III)	5–1	FC Proletari Surazh (IV)

== Second round ==
In this round entered 4 winners from the First Round and the 60 Second Division teams. The matches were played between 15 and 29 April 2007.

=== Section West ===
Team 1	Score	Team 2
Dynamo Saint Petersburg (III)	2–1	Baltika-2 Kaliningrad (III)
Volochanin-Ratmir Vyshny Volochyok (III)	3–1 (a.e.t.)	Zenit-2 Saint Petersburg (III)
Volga Tver (III)	2–0	Sheksna Cherepovets (III)
Spartak Kostroma (III)	1–2	Dynamo Vologda (III)
Torpedo Vladimir (III)	3–0	FC Zelenograd
Sportakademklub Moscow (III)	1–2	FC Reutov (III)
FC Smolensk	0–1	Nara-Desna Naro-Fominsk (III)
Torpedo-RG Moscow (III)	1–0	Spartak Shchyolkovo (III)

=== Section South ===
Team 1	Score	Team 2
Olimpia Volgograd (III)	3–1 (a.e.t.)	Tekstilshchik Kamyshin
Rotor Volgograd (III)	1–0	Sudostroitel Astrakhan (III)
Kavkaztransgaz-2005 Ryzdvyany (III)	0–2	Torpedo Volzhsky (III)
Avtodor Vladikavkaz (III)	1–2	Dynamo Stavropol (III)
FC Taganrog (III)	0–1 (a.e.t.)	Bataysk-2007 Bataysk (III)
Sochi-04 Sochi (III)	2–1	Druzhba Maykop (III)
Spartak-UGP Anapa	1–2	Krasnodar-2000 Krasnodar

=== Section East ===
Team 1	Score	Team 2
Zarya Leninsk-Kuznetsky (III)	0–2	Shakhtyor Prokopyevsk (III)
Amur Blagoveshchensk (III)	3–1 (a.e.t.)	FC Chita (III)
Sakhalin Yuzhno-Sakhalinsk (III)	0–2	Smena Komsomolsk-na-Amure (III)

=== Section Center ===
Team 1	Score	Team 2
Zorky Krasnogorsk	0–1	Lobnya-Alla Lobnya (III)
Nika Moscow (III)	0–1	Vityaz Podolsk (III)
Zvezda Serpukhov (III)	0–2	FC Lukhovitsy (III)
FC Ryazan (III)	0–0 (a.e.t.) (3–1 p)	Saturn Yegoryevsk
FC Yelets (III)	4–0	Don Novomoskovsk (III)
FC Gubkin (III)	0–2	Lokomotiv Liski (III)
Metallurg Lipetsk (III)	0–1	Dynamo Voronezh (III)
Spartak Tambov (III)	1–2	Zenit Penza (III)

=== Section Ural-Povolzhye ===
Team 1	Score	Team 2
Dynamo Kirov (III)	2–0	Volga Nizhny Novgorod (III)
Rubin-2 Kazan (III)	2–2 (a.e.t.) (4–5 p)	Alnas Almetyevsk (III)
Volga Ulyanovsk (III)	3–2	Krylia Sovetov-SOK Dimitrovgrad (III)
SOYUZ-Gazprom Izhevsk (III)	1–1 (a.e.t.) (5–4 p)	Neftekhimik Nizhnekamsk (III)
Zenit Chelyabinsk (III)	2–5 (a.e.t.)	FC Tyumen (III)
Sokol-Saratov Saratov (III)	0–2	Yunit Samara (III)

== Third round ==
In this round entered 32 winners from the Second Round and the 8 remaining Second Division teams. The matches were played between 29 April and 14 May 2007.

=== Section West ===
Team 1	Score	Team 2
Dynamo Saint Petersburg	1–2	Volochanin-Ratmir Vyshny Volochyok
Dynamo Vologda	0–1	Volga Tver
FC Reutov	1–3	Torpedo Vladimir
Nara-Desna Naro-Fominsk	2–1	Torpedo-RG Moscow

=== Section Center ===
Team 1	Score	Team 2
Vityaz Podolsk	1–1 (a.e.t.) (4–5 p)	Lobnya-Alla Lobnya
FC Lukhovitsy	1–0	FC Ryazan
Lokomotiv Liski	2–0	FC Yelets
Zenit Penza	2–1	Dynamo Voronezh

=== Section East ===
Team 1	Score	Team 2
Metallurg Krasnoyarsk (III)	0–0 (a.e.t.) (4–2 p)	Irtysh-1946 Omsk (III)
Shakhtyor Prokopyevsk	0–2	Dynamo Barnaul (III)
Sibiryak Bratsk (III)	0–2	Amur Blagoveshchensk
Smena Komsomolsk-na-Amure	2–1	Okean Nakhodka (III)

=== Section South ===
Team 1	Score	Team 2
Olimpia Volgograd	0–3	Rotor Volgograd
Dynamo Stavropol	5–0	Torpedo Volzhsky
Bataysk-2007 Bataysk	2–1	Sochi-04 Sochi
Krasnodar-2000 Krasnodar	1–2	Chernomorets Novorossiysk (III)

=== Section Ural-Povolzhye ===
Team 1	Score	Team 2
Alnas Almetyevsk	1–0	Dynamo Kirov
Lada Togliatti (III)	2–3 (a.e.t.)	Volga Ulyanovsk
FC Tyumen	2–2 (a.e.t.) (4–2 p)	SOYUZ-Gazprom Izhevsk
Yunit Samara	1–4	Gazovik Orenburg (III)

== Fourth round ==
In this round entered 20 winners from the Third Round teams. The matches were played between 18 May and 2 June 2007.

=== Section West ===
Team 1	Score	Team 2
Volga Tver	1–0	Volochanin-Ratmir Vyshny Volochyok
Nara-Desna Naro-Fominsk	1–1 (a.e.t.) (2–4 p)	Torpedo Vladimir

=== Section Center ===
Team 1	Score	Team 2
Lobnya-Alla Lobnya	2–2 (a.e.t.) (6–7 p)	FC Lukhovitsy
Lokomotiv Liski	0–0 (a.e.t.) (2–4 p)	Zenit Penza

=== Section East ===
Team 1	Score	Team 2
Dynamo Barnaul	0–0 (a.e.t.) (4–5 p)	Metallurg Krasnoyarsk
Smena Komsomolsk-na-Amure	3–2	Amur Blagoveshchensk

=== Section South ===
Team 1	Score	Team 2
Rotor Volgograd	1–1 (a.e.t.) (7–6 p)	Dynamo Stavropol
Chernomorets Novorossiysk	4–0	Bataysk-2007 Bataysk

=== Section Ural-Povolzhye ===
Team 1	Score	Team 2
Volga Ulyanovsk	2–3	Alnas Almetyevsk
Gazovik Orenburg	1–0	FC Tyumen

== Fifth round ==
In this round entered 10 winners from the Fourth Round teams and the 22 First Division teams. The matches were played on 12 and 13 June 2007.

Team 1	Score	Team 2
Torpedo Vladimir	0–0 (a.e.t.) (3–4 p)	Baltika Kaliningrad (II)
Volga Tver	0–0 (a.e.t.) (3–4 p)	Torpedo Moscow (II)
FC Lukhovitsy	6–0	Mordovia Saransk (II)
Shinnik Yaroslavl (II)	1–1 (a.e.t.) (4–3 p)	Tekstilshchik-Telekom Ivanovo (II)
Dynamo Bryansk (II)	1–0	Spartak-MZhK Ryazan (II)
Zenit Penza	1–2	Avangard Kursk (II)
Chernomorets Novorossiysk	2–3	Salyut-Energia Belgorod (II)
SKA Rostov-on-Don (II)	1–0	Mashuk-KMV Pyatigorsk (II)
Terek Grozny (II)	2–0	Alania Vladikavkaz (II)
Rotor Volgograd	2–1	Anzhi Makhachkala (II)
Sodovik Sterlitamak (II)	0–1	Nosta Novotroitsk (II)
Alnas Almetyevsk	1–3	KAMAZ Naberezhnye Chelny (II)
Gazovik Orenburg	0–2	Ural Sverdlovsk Oblast (II)
Metallurg-Kuzbass Novokuznetsk (II)	2–1	Sibir Novosibirsk (II)
Metallurg Krasnoyarsk	3–1 (a.e.t.)	Smena Komsomolsk-na-Amure
SKA-Energiya Khabarovsk (II)	2–2 (a.e.t.) (5–4 p)	Zvezda Irkutsk (II)

== Round of 32 ==
In this round entered 16 winners from the Fifth Round teams and the all Premier League teams. The matches were played on 27 June 2007.

27 June 2007	Baltika Kaliningrad	0–1	CSKA Moscow	Kaliningrad
20:00		Report	Taranov 23'	Stadium: Baltika Stadium; Attendance: 14,660; Referee: Aleksei Kovalyov

27 June 2007	Torpedo Moscow	1–2	FC Khimki	Moscow
19:00	Panov 30'	Report	Shirokov 39', 53'	Stadium: Luzhniki Stadium; Attendance: 3,500; Referee: Vladislav Bezborodov

27 June 2007	FC Lukhovitsy	1–2	Rubin Kazan	Lukhovitsy
19:00	Rybin 84'	Report	Volkov 7'; Gațcan 56'	Stadium: Spartak Stadium; Attendance: 3,200; Referee: Sergei Karasyov

27 June 2007	Shinnik Yaroslavl	1–2 (a.e.t.)	Spartak Nalchik	Yaroslavl
19:00	Khazov 93'	Report	Shumeyko 99'; Balkarov 119'	Stadium: Shinnik Stadium; Attendance: 13,500; Referee: Stanislav Sukhina

27 June 2007	Dynamo Bryansk	1–4	Zenit Saint Petersburg	Bryansk
19:00	Malin 56' (pen.)	Report	Domínguez 16'; Šírl 43'; Tymoshchuk 45+', 90+' (pen.)	Stadium: Dynamo Stadium; Attendance: 10,100; Referee: Aleksandr Gonchar

27 June 2007	Avangard Kursk	0–3	Dynamo Moscow	Kursk
18:30		Report	Kolodin 28' (pen.); Tonkikh 61' (o.g.); Khokhlov 78'	Stadium: Trudovye Rezervy Stadium; Attendance: 10,000; Referee: Sergei Timofeyev

27 June 2007	Salyut-Energia Belgorod	0–0 (a.e.t.) (2–3 p)	Tom Tomsk	Belgorod
18:30		Report		Stadium: Salyut Stadium; Attendance: 10,500; Referee: Radik Akhmadullin
	Penalties
	Yermak (penalty missed); Morozov (penalty scored); Starkov (penalty missed); Yermakov (penalty missed); Kushov (penalty scored)		(penalty scored) Mostovoi; (penalty scored) Tarasov; (penalty missed) Shirko; (penalty missed) Serdyukov; (penalty scored) Bulyga

27 June 2007	SKA Rostov-on-Don	0–3	FC Rostov	Rostov-on-Don
19:00		Report	Buznikin 25'; Horák 67'; Bochkov 69'	Stadium: SKA SKVO Stadium; Attendance: 11,300; Referee: Nikolai Ivanov

27 June 2007	Terek Grozny	1–1 (a.e.t.) (4–3 p)	Spartak Moscow	Lermontov
18:00	Kulik 80'	Report	Torbinski 53'	Stadium: Beshtau Stadium; Attendance: 4,100; Referee: Igor Egorov
	Penalties
	Adiev (penalty scored); Kulik (penalty scored); Martinović (penalty missed); Testemitanu (penalty scored); Tchuissé (penalty scored)		(penalty missed) Bystrov; (penalty scored) Torbinski; (penalty missed) Kováč; (penalty scored) Kalynychenko; (penalty scored) Pavlyuchenko

27 June 2007	Rotor Volgograd	1–4	Amkar Perm	Volgograd
19:00	Veretennikov 36' (pen.)	Report	Kushev 22', 42' (pen.); Belorukov 77'; Volkov 82'	Stadium: Central Stadium; Attendance: 7,000; Referee: Ildus Biglov

27 June 2007	Nosta Novotroitsk	1–1 (a.e.t.) (2–4 p)	FC Moscow	Novotroitsk
17:00	Kuznetsov 29'	Report	Ivanov 74'	Stadium: Metallurg Stadium; Attendance: 6,060; Referee: Yuri Kunitsa
	Penalties
	Nizamutdinov (penalty missed); Molosh (penalty scored); Surodin (penalty missed); Alexeyev (penalty scored)		(penalty scored) Čížek; (penalty scored) Kuzmin; (penalty scored) Jop; (penalty scored) Golyshev

27 June 2007	KAMAZ Naberezhnye Chelny	1–0	Krylia Sovetov Samara	Naberezhnye Chelny
18:00	Zavaliy 45+'	Report		Stadium: KAMAZ Stadium; Attendance: 8,500; Referee: Vitali Doroshenko

27 June 2007	Ural Sverdlovsk Oblast	1–0 (a.e.t.)	Lokomotiv Moscow	Yekaterinburg
17:00	Radkevich 116'	Report		Stadium: Uralmash Stadium; Attendance: 13,000; Referee: Aleksei Reznikov

27 June 2007	Metallurg-Kuzbass Novokuznetsk	1–2	Kuban Krasnodar	Novokuznetsk
14:00	Avsyuk 71'	Report	Gogniyev 7', 90'	Stadium: Metallurg Stadium; Attendance: 4,000; Referee: Aleksandr Kolobayev

27 June 2007	Metallurg Krasnoyarsk	1–0	Luch-Energiya Vladivostok	Krasnoyarsk
14:30	Kunizhev 41'	Report		Stadium: Central Stadium; Attendance: 5,500; Referee: Aleksandr Kabakov

27 June 2007	SKA-Energiya Khabarovsk	1–2	Saturn Moscow Oblast	Khabarovsk
12:00	Grigore 45'	Report	Vlasov 32'; Zaytsev 65' (pen.)	Stadium: Lenin Stadium; Attendance: 10,000; Referee: Maksim Layushkin

== Round of 16 ==
The matches were played on 8 August 2007.

8 August 2007	CSKA Moscow	2–0	FC Khimki	Moscow
19:00	Janczyk 24'; Zhirkov 88'	Report		Stadium: Dynamo Stadium; Attendance: 6,100; Referee: Vitali Doroshenko

8 August 2007	Spartak Nalchik	3–2 (a.e.t.)	Rubin Kazan	Nalchik
20:00	Dzakhmishev 34'; Geteriev 98'; Dyshekov 116'	Report	Paunović 9'; Ayupov 114'	Stadium: Spartak Stadium; Attendance: 8,000; Referee: Yuri Klyuchnikov

8 August 2007	Zenit Saint Petersburg	9–3	Dynamo Moscow	Saint Petersburg
19:30	Tymoshchuk 9' (pen.), 41' (pen.), 74'; Domínguez 51' (pen.), 90+'; Zyryanov 61', 65', 80'; Arshavin 72'	Report	Klimavičius 68'; Genkov 70'; D. Kombarov 83'	Stadium: Petrovsky Stadium; Attendance: 15,000; Referee: Aleksandr Yevstigneyev

8 August 2007	FC Rostov	0–1	Tom Tomsk	Rostov-on-Don
19:00		Report	Serdyukov 7'	Stadium: Olimp – 2 Attendance: 4,500; Referee: Aleksei Sergeyev

8 August 2007	Amkar Perm	3–1	Terek Grozny	Perm
17:00	Grishin 34'; Kushev 42', 48'	Report	Adiev 90+'	Stadium: Zvezda Stadium; Attendance: 8,500; Referee: Vladislav Bezborodov

8 August 2007	KAMAZ Naberezhnye Chelny	0–1	FC Moscow	Naberezhnye Chelny
18:00		Report	Čížek 9'	Stadium: KAMAZ Stadium; Attendance: 9,000; Referee: Igor Egorov

8 August 2007	Kuban Krasnodar	2–3 (a.e.t.)	Ural Sverdlovsk Oblast	Krasnodar
20:00	Tlisov 88'; Zhukov 98' (o.g.)	Report	Mysin 64'; Kozhanov 93' (pen.); Alkhimov 105+'	Stadium: Kuban Stadium; Attendance: 8,000; Referee: Aleksei Kovalyov

8 August 2007	Saturn Moscow Oblast	2–1	Metallurg Krasnoyarsk	Ramenskoye
19:00	Kirichenko 58'; Eremenko 76'	Report	Kachan 90+'	Stadium: Saturn Stadium; Attendance: 8,200; Referee: Georgi Maramygin

== Quarter-finals ==
The matches were played on 16 September and 31 October 2007.

31 October 2007	CSKA Moscow	2–1	Spartak Nalchik	Moscow
18:00	Jô 55'; Carvalho 73'	Report	Kazharov 4'	Stadium: Luzhniki Stadium; Attendance: 5,000; Referee: Aleksei Kovalyov

31 October 2007	Zenit Saint Petersburg	0–0 (a.e.t.) (3–4 p)	Tom Tomsk	Saint Petersburg
19:30		Report		Stadium: Petrovsky Stadium; Attendance: 11,500; Referee: Aleksei Nikolayev
	Penalties
	Radimov (penalty scored); Lebedev (penalty scored); Gorshkov (penalty scored); Ricksen (penalty missed); Čontofalský (penalty missed); Ionov (penalty missed)		(penalty missed) Michkov; (penalty scored) Skoblyakov; (penalty missed) Klimov; (penalty scored) Yevsikov; (penalty scored) Bulyga; (penalty scored) Vejić

16 September 2007	Amkar Perm	2–1	FC Moscow	Perm
16:00	Kobenko 2'; Kushev 51'	Report	Semak 12'	Stadium: Zvezda Stadium; Attendance: 14,500; Referee: Vitali Doroshenko

16 September 2007	Ural Sverdlovsk Oblast	2–1	Saturn Moscow Oblast	Yekaterinburg
15:00	Kozhanov 14', 35'	Report	Karyaka 21'	Stadium: Uralmash Stadium; Attendance: 13,000; Referee: Sergei Matsyura

== Semi-finals ==
The matches were played on 16 April 2008.

16 April 2008	CSKA Moscow	2–1	Tom Tomsk	Moscow
19:00	Krasić 14'; Ignashevich 51'	Report	Klimov 27'	Stadium: Luzhniki Stadium; Attendance: 5,000; Referee: Vitali Doroshenko

16 April 2008	Amkar Perm	1–0	Ural Sverdlovsk Oblast	Perm
17:00	Dujmović 53'	Report		Stadium: Zvezda Stadium; Attendance: 19,000; Referee: Aleksei Nikolayev

== Final ==
The match was played on 17 May 2008.

17 May 2008
15:00 MSD

CSKA Moscow	2–2 (a.e.t.)	Amkar Perm
Vágner Love 65'; Jô 74'	Report	Drinčić 57'; Dujmović 64'
Penalties
Zhirkov (penalty scored); Vágner Love (penalty scored); Jô (penalty scored); Janczyk (penalty scored)	4–1	(penalty missed) Drinčić; (penalty scored) Kushev; (penalty missed) Dujmović

Lokomotiv Stadium, Moscow
Attendance: 24,000
Referee: Stanislav Sukhina (Malakhovka)

CSKA	Amkar

GK	35	(Russia) Igor Akinfeev (c)
DF	2	(Lithuania) Deividas Šemberas
DF	4	(Russia) Sergei Ignashevich	(substituted off) 66'
DF	6	(Russia) Aleksei Berezutski
DF	24	(Russia) Vasili Berezutski
MF	8	(Brazil) Dudu	(yellow card) 5'	(substituted off) 87'
MF	10	(Brazil) Jô
MF	17	(Serbia) Miloš Krasić	(substituted off) 80'
MF	18	(Russia) Yuri Zhirkov	(yellow card) 105'
MF	22	(Russia) Evgeni Aldonin	(substituted off) 61'
FW	9	(Brazil) Vágner Love
Substitutes:
GK	33	(Russia) Yevgeny Pomazan
DF	15	(Nigeria) Chidi Odiah
DF	50	(Russia) Anton Grigoryev
MF	25	(Bosnia and Herzegovina) Elvir Rahimić	(substituted on) 66'
MF	46	(Russia) Alan Dzagoev	(substituted on) 61'
FW	14	(Brazil) Ricardo Jesus
FW	19	(Poland) Dawid Janczyk	(substituted on) 87'
Manager:
(Russia) Valery Gazzaev Assistant referees: Yevgeni Volnin (Vladimir); Viktor Lebedev (Saint Petersburg); Fourth official: Maksim Layushkin (Moscow)

GK	1	(Russia) Vladimir Gabulov
DF	14	(Bulgaria) Zahari Sirakov	(substituted off) 70'
DF	15	(Hungary) Miklós Gaál
DF	21	(Russia) Dmitri Belorukov	(yellow card) 94'
DF	24	(Russia) Aleksei Popov (c)
MF	3	(Russia) Ivan Starkov
MF	7	(Bulgaria) Georgi Peev	(yellow card) 29'	(substituted off) 90'
MF	18	(Montenegro) Nikola Drinčić
MF	22	(Croatia) Tomislav Dujmović
FW	29	(Bulgaria) Martin Kushev
FW	99	(Serbia) Predrag Sikimić	(substituted off) 76'
Substitutes:
GK	42	(Russia) Sergei Narubin
DF	23	(Russia) Ivan Cherenchikov	(substituted on) 70'
DF	69	(Serbia) Marko Milovanović
MF	10	(Belarus) Mikhail Afanasyev	(substituted on) 90'
MF	77	(Russia) Ildar Akhmetzyanov
FW	19	(Russia) Nikolai Zhilyayev
FW	33	(Serbia) Nenad Injac	(substituted on) 76'	(yellow card) 111'
Manager:
(Montenegro) Miodrag Božović

Played in the earlier stages, but were not on the final game squad:

PFC CSKA Moscow: Veniamin Mandrykin (GK), (Brazil) Daniel Carvalho (MF), (Brazil) Eduardo Ratinho (MF), (Turkey) Caner Erkin (MF), Sergei Gorelov (MF), Rolan Gusev (MF), Ivan Taranov (MF), Dmitry Tikhonov (FW), Nikita Burmistrov (FW).

FC Sibir Novosibirsk: Ivan Levenets (GK), Pavel Alikin (DF), (Moldova) Ghenadie Olexici (DF), Vitali Grishin (MF), (Belarus) Andrei Lavrik (MF), Mikhail Makagonov (MF), Andrei Kobenko (MF), (Spain) Antonio Soldevilla (MF), Sergei Volkov (FW), Yevgeny Savin (FW).
