= 2008 PFC CSKA Moscow season =

PFC CSKA Moscow
2008 season
- Manager: Valery Gazzaev
- Russian Premier League: 2nd
- 2007–08 Russian Cup: Winners
- 2008–09 Russian Cup: Progressed to 2009 season
- 2008–09 UEFA Cup: Progressed to 2009 season
- Top goalscorer: League: Vágner Love (20); All: Vágner Love (27)

The 2008 Russian football season, saw CSKA Moscow competed in the Russian Premier League, finishing 2nd behind Rubin Kazan, and in Russian Cup. CSKA won the 2007–08 Russian Cup and progressed to the quarter-finals of the 2008-09 Cup by the end of the 2007 season.

== Squad ==
As of match played 4 December 2008

Number	Name	Nationality	Position	Date of birth (age)	Signed from	Signed in	Contract ends	Apps.	Goals
Goalkeepers
33	Yevgeny Pomazan	(Russia)	GK	31 January 1989 (aged 19)	Kuban Krasnodar	2008		3	0
35	Igor Akinfeev	(Russia)	GK	8 April 1986 (aged 22)	Academy	2003		208	0
51	Sergei Zhideyev	(Russia)	GK	2 April 1987 (aged 21)	Trudovyye Rezervy Moscow	2002		0	0
60	Dmitry Abakumov	(Russia)	GK	8 July 1989 (aged 19)	Fakel Voronezh	2008		0	0
87	Pavel Figon	(Russia)	GK	22 May 1990 (aged 18)	Lokomotiv Moscow Academy	2008		0	0
91	Artur Nigmatullin	(Russia)	GK	17 May 1991 (aged 17)	Luch-Energiya Vladivostok	2008		0	0
Defenders
2	Deividas Šemberas	(Lithuania)	DF	2 August 1978 (aged 30)	Dynamo Moscow	2002		252	0
4	Sergei Ignashevich	(Russia)	DF	14 July 1979 (aged 29)	Lokomotiv Moscow	2004		190	19
6	Aleksei Berezutski	(Russia)	DF	20 June 1982 (aged 26)	Chernomorets Novorossiysk	2001		257	7
15	Chidi Odiah	(Nigeria)	DF	17 December 1983 (aged 24)	Sheriff Tiraspol	2004		87	4
24	Vasili Berezutski	(Russia)	DF	20 June 1982 (aged 26)	Torpedo-ZIL	2002		204	6
36	Anton Vlasov	(Russia)	DF	11 May 1989 (aged 19)	Krylia Sovetov-SOK Dimitrovgrad	2008		0	0
38	Sergei Perunov	(Russia)	DF	4 June 1990 (aged 18)	Nosta Novotroitsk	2008		0	0
40	Nikolai Zaytsev	(Russia)	DF	1 June 1989 (aged 19)	Kuban Krasnodar	2008		0	0
42	Georgi Shchennikov	(Russia)	DF	27 April 1991 (aged 17)	Academy	2008		4	0
47	Batraz Zasseyev	(Russia)	DF	10 September 1991 (aged 17)	Academy	2008		0	0
49	Dmitri Protopopov	(Kazakhstan)	DF	23 January 1988 (aged 20)	Ryazan	2007		0	0
50	Anton Grigoryev	(Russia)	DF	13 December 1985 (aged 22)	Academy	2004		51	0
55	Iskandar Dzhalilov	(Tajikistan)	DF	1 June 1992 (aged 16)	Academy	2008		0	0
62	Ruslan Perepelyukov	(Russia)	DF	15 March 1990 (aged 18)	Academy	2007		0	0
90	Viktor Klimeyev	(Russia)	DF	16 January 1990 (aged 18)	Gazovik Orenburg	2007		0	0
Midfielders
5	Ramón	(Brazil)	MF	24 May 1988 (aged 20)	Corinthians	2007		34	2
11	Pavel Mamayev	(Russia)	MF	17 September 1988 (aged 20)	Torpedo Moscow	2007		29	2
17	Miloš Krasić	(Serbia)	MF	1 November 1984 (aged 24)	Vojvodina	2004		171	18
18	Yuri Zhirkov	(Russia)	MF	20 August 1983 (aged 25)	Spartak Tambov	2004		198	21
20	Luboš Kalouda	(Czech Republic)	MF	20 May 1987 (aged 21)	1.FC Brno	2008		3	0
22	Evgeni Aldonin	(Russia)	MF	22 January 1980 (aged 28)	Rotor Volgograd	2004		210	11
25	Elvir Rahimić	(Bosnia and Herzegovina)	MF	4 April 1976 (aged 32)	Anzhi Makhachkala	2001		292	4
41	Nikolai Zhirkov	(Russia)	MF	3 July 1988 (aged 20)	Academy	2008		0	0
43	Amir Kashiyev	(Russia)	MF	11 December 1989 (aged 18)	Academy	2006		2	0
44	Dmitri Arslanov	(Russia)	MF	10 February 1990 (aged 18)	Academy	2008		0	0
46	Alan Dzagoev	(Russia)	MF	17 June 1990 (aged 18)	Krylia Sovetov-SOK Dimitrovgrad	2008		29	13
48	Igor Dragunov	(Russia)	MF	6 April 1991 (aged 17)	Academy	2008		0	0
48	Dmitriy Manoshkin	(Russia)	MF	28 June 1990 (aged 18)	Lokomotiv Moscow Academy	2008		0	0
56	Maksim Karpov	(Russia)	MF	2 April 1990 (aged 18)	Academy	2008		0	0
58	Viktor Vorobyov	(Russia)	MF	29 January 1990 (aged 18)	Academy	2008		0	0
63	Dmitriy Zameshayev	(Russia)	MF	14 May 1991 (aged 17)	Academy	2008		0	0
64	Yevgeni Sherenkov	(Russia)	MF	27 January 1991 (aged 17)	Academy	2008		0	0
88	Caner Erkin	(Turkey)	MF	4 October 1988 (aged 20)	Manisaspor	2007		38	2
Forwards
9	Vágner Love	(Brazil)	FW	11 June 1984 (aged 24)	Palmeiras	2004		163	88
14	Ricardo Jesus	(Brazil)	FW	16 May 1985 (aged 23)	Spartak Nalchik	2008		13	1
19	Dawid Janczyk	(Poland)	FW	23 September 1987 (aged 21)	Legia Warsaw	2007		22	3
37	Dmitri Ryzhov	(Russia)	FW	26 August 1989 (aged 19)	Krylia Sovetov-SOK Dimitrovgrad	2008		11	0
39	Aleksei Volkov	(Russia)	FW	10 June 1991 (aged 17)	Academy	2008		0	0
45	Aleksandr Kudryavtsev	(Russia)	FW	9 June 1990 (aged 18)	Academy	2008		0	0
52	Anton Zabolotny	(Russia)	FW	13 June 1991 (aged 17)	Metallurg Lipetsk	2004		0	0
59	Sergei Shumilin	(Russia)	FW	21 February 1990 (aged 18)	Acaademy	2008		0	0
61	Ganiyu Oseni	(Nigeria)	FW	19 September 1991 (aged 17)	loan from Prime	2008		0	0
Away on loan
1	Veniamin Mandrykin	(Russia)	GK	30 August 1981 (aged 27)	Alania Vladikavkaz	2002		95	0
7	Daniel Carvalho	(Brazil)	MF	1 March 1983 (aged 25)	Internacional	2003	2009	119	26
42	Dmitry Tikhonov	(Russia)	FW	13 September 1988 (aged 20)	Academy	2004		5	1
	Nikita Burmistrov	(Russia)	FW	6 July 1989 (aged 19)	Academy	2007		6	0
Players that left during the season
8	Dudu	(Brazil)	MF	15 April 1983 (aged 25)	Rennes	2005		107	10
10	Jô	(Brazil)	FW	20 March 1987 (aged 21)	Corinthians	2006		77	44

=== Out on loan ===
Note: Flags indicate national team as defined under FIFA eligibility rules; some limited exceptions apply. Players may hold more than one non-FIFA nationality.

No.	Pos.	Nation	Player
1	GK	RUS	Veniamin Mandrykin (at Tom Tomsk)
7	MF	BRA	Daniel Carvalho (at Internacional)

No.	Pos.	Nation	Player
42	FW	RUS	Dmitry Tikhonov (loan to (Russia) Sportakademklub Moscow)
—	FW	RUS	Nikita Burmistrov (at Luch-Energiya Vladivostok)

== Transfers ==
=== Winter ===
In: Note: Flags indicate national team as defined under FIFA eligibility rules; some limited exceptions apply. Players may hold more than one non-FIFA nationality.

No.	Pos.	Nation	Player
14	FW	BRA	Ricardo Jesus (from (Russia) Spartak Nalchik)
20	MF	CZE	Luboš Kalouda (from (Czech Republic) 1.FC Brno)
33	GK	RUS	Yevgeny Pomazan (from (Russia) Kuban Krasnodar, previously on loan)
36	DF	RUS	Anton Vlasov (from (Russia) Krylya Sovetov-SOK Dimitrovgrad)
37	FW	RUS	Dmitri Ryzhov (from (Russia) Krylya Sovetov-SOK Dimitrovgrad)
40	DF	RUS	Nikolai Zaytsev (from (Russia) Kuban Krasnodar)
46	MF	RUS	Alan Dzagoev (from (Russia) Krylya Sovetov-SOK Dimitrovgrad)
57	MF	RUS	Nikita Andreyev (trial from (Estonia) Levadia Tallinn)
61	FW	NGA	Ganiyu Oseni (loan from (Nigeria) Prime)

Out: Note: Flags indicate national team as defined under FIFA eligibility rules; some limited exceptions apply. Players may hold more than one non-FIFA nationality.

No.	Pos.	Nation	Player
1	GK	RUS	Veniamin Mandrykin (loan to (Russia) Tom Tomsk)
8	MF	RUS	Rolan Gusev (to (Ukraine) Dnipro Dnipropetrovsk)
21	DF	BRA	Ratinho (loan return to (Brazil) Corinthians)
36	MF	RUS	Aleksei Blokha
38	DF	RUS	Oleg Malyukov (to (Russia) Sportakademklub Moscow)
39	DF	RUS	Ivan Taranov (to (Russia) Krylia Sovetov)
41	DF	RUS	Valeriy Safonov (to (Russia) Istra)
42	FW	RUS	Dmitry Tikhonov (loan to (Russia) Sportakademklub Moscow)
44	FW	RUS	Nikita Burmistrov (loan to (Russia) Luch-Energiya)
47	FW	RUS	Igor Kuzmin (to (Russia) Saturn)
48	FW	RUS	Renat Miftahov
54	MF	RUS	Aleksei Vasilyev (to (Russia) Nosta Novotroitsk)
55	DF	RUS	Vadim Gagloyev (to (Russia) Alania Vladikavkaz)
56	MF	RUS	Vladimir Tatarchuk (to (Russia) Krasnodar)

=== Summer ===
In: Note: Flags indicate national team as defined under FIFA eligibility rules; some limited exceptions apply. Players may hold more than one non-FIFA nationality.

No.	Pos.	Nation	Player

Out: Note: Flags indicate national team as defined under FIFA eligibility rules; some limited exceptions apply. Players may hold more than one non-FIFA nationality.

No.	Pos.	Nation	Player
7	MF	BRA	Daniel Carvalho (loan to (Brazil) Internacional)
8	MF	BRA	Dudu (to (Greece) Olympiacos)
10	FW	BRA	Jô (to (England) Manchester City)
53	DF	RUS	Alan Alborov (to (Russia) KAMAZ)

== Competitions ==
=== Russian Premier League ===
==== Results by round ====
Round	1	2	3	4	5	6	7	8	9	10	11	12	13	14	15	16	17	18	19	20	21	22	23	24	25	26	27	28	29	30
Ground	H	A	H	A	H	H	A	A	H	H	A	A	H	A	H	H	A	H	A	A	H	A	H	A	H	A	H	A	H	A
Result	D	W	W	L	L	D	W	D	D	W	L	W	D	L	D	D	D	W	W	D	W	W	W	W	W	W	L	W	W	L

Updated to match(es) played on 22 November 2008. Source: See Results
A = Away; H = Home; W = Win; D = Draw; L = Loss

==== Results ====
15 March 2008 1	CSKA Moscow	1 – 1	Shinnik Yaroslavl	Moscow
14:00 MSK (UTC+3)	V.Berezutski (yellow card) 32'; Jô 63'; Jesus (yellow card) 66'	Report	Basto (yellow card) 22'; Đorđević (yellow card) 23'; Kudryashov (yellow card) 28'; Laizāns 67'; Semochko (yellow card) 90'; Stepanov (yellow card) 90'	Stadium: Luzhniki Stadium; Attendance: 14,500; Referee: Vitali Doroshenko

22 March 2008 2	Krylia Sovetov	0 – 2	CSKA Moscow	Samara
14:00 MSK (UTC+3)	Booth (yellow card) 66'	Report	A.Berezutski 21'; Zhirkov (yellow card) 23'; Šemberas (yellow card) 41'; Dudu (yellow card) 58'; Jô 65'; V.Berezutski (yellow card) 69'; Aldonin (yellow card) 85'	Stadium: Metallurg Stadium; Attendance: 32,500; Referee: Vladislav Bezborodov

30 March 2008 3	CSKA Moscow	1 – 0	Saturn	Moscow
16:00 MSK (UTC+4)	Odiah (yellow card) 70'; Vágner Love 71'	Report	Jakubko (yellow card) 56'; Ďurica (yellow card) 85'	Stadium: Luzhniki Stadium; Attendance: 16,000; Referee: Nikolai Ivanov

5 April 2008 4	Terek Grozny	1 – 0	CSKA Moscow	Grozny
14:00 MSK (UTC+4)	Essame (yellow card) 58'; Kuzmichyov 65'; Zabavník (yellow card) 84'	Report	Šemberas (yellow card) 68'; Ryzhov (yellow card) 80'	Stadium: Akhmat-Arena; Attendance: 10,000; Referee: Aleksandr Gvardis

12 April 2008 5	CSKA Moscow	0 – 1	Spartak Nalchik	Moscow
16:30 MSK (UTC+4)	Odiah (yellow card) 70'; Ryzhov (yellow card) 79'; Akinfeev (yellow card) 90'	Report	Gogua (yellow card) 14'; Kisenkov (yellow card) 19'; Amisulashvili (yellow card) 38'; Kazharov 90+2'	Stadium: Luzhniki Stadium; Attendance: 12,000; Referee: Igor Yegorov

20 April 2008 6	CSKA Moscow	0 – 0	Lokomotiv Moscow	Moscow
16:00 MSK (UTC+4)	Krasić (yellow card) 7'; Aldonin (yellow card) 16'; Odiah (yellow card) 65'	Report	Sychev (yellow card) 13'; Rodolfo (yellow card) 78'; Glushakov (yellow card) 87'	Stadium: Luzhniki Stadium; Attendance: 23,350; Referee: Igor Zakharov

26 April 2008 7	Luch-Energiya	1 – 3	CSKA Moscow	Vladivostok
14:00 MSK (UTC+4)	Vujović (yellow card) 8'; Bulyga 22'; Goore (yellow card) 26'; Bazayev (penalty missed) 29'	Report	Jô 24'; Vágner Love 43'; V.Berezutski (yellow card) 59'; Aldonin 89'	Stadium: Dynamo Stadium; Attendance: 8,500; Referee: Stanislav Sukhina

7 May 2008 9	Tom Tomsk	0 – 0	CSKA Moscow	Tomsk
16:00 MSK (UTC+4)	Jokić (yellow card) 44'; Mandrykin (yellow card) 86'	Report	Aldonin (yellow card) 13'; Ignashevich (yellow card) 56'	Stadium: Trud Stadium; Attendance: 14,000; Referee: Igor Yegorov

11 May 2008 10	CSKA Moscow	4 – 3	Khimki	Moscow
16:30 MSK (UTC+4)	Krasić 8'; Ignashevich 21'; Dzagoev 38'; V.Berezutski (yellow card) 44'; Odiah (yellow card) 64'; Dudu 89' (pen.)	Report	Nizamutdinov 14', 87' (yellow card) 33' (yellow-red card) 90'; Stepanov (yellow card) 36'; Drozdov (yellow card) 37'; Čeh 45+3'; Pershin (yellow card) 75'	Stadium: Dynamo Stadium; Attendance: 9,800; Referee: Aleksei Nikolaev

6 July 2008 12	CSKA Moscow	0 – 2	Dynamo Moscow	Moscow
16:00 MSK (UTC+4)	Ramón (yellow card) 24'; Grigoryev (red card) 60'; Zhirkov (yellow card) 63'; Erkin (yellow card) 65'; Ignashevich (yellow card) 75'; Aldonin (yellow card) 90'	Report	Semshov 12'; Kowalczyk (yellow card) 17'; K.Kombarov (yellow card) 49'; Kolodin 61' (pen.) (yellow card) 61' (yellow-red card) 71'	Stadium: Luzhniki Stadium; Attendance: 15,000; Referee: Maksim Layushkin

12 July 2008 13	Spartak Moscow	1 – 5	CSKA Moscow	Moscow
16:00 MSK (UTC+4)	Mozart (yellow card) 50'; Kováč (yellow card) 63'; Bazhenov 68'	Report	Vágner Love 15', 34', 44'; Krasić 51'; Erkin 77'	Stadium: Luzhniki Stadium; Attendance: 49,000; Referee: Yuri Baskakov

16 July 2008 11	Amkar Perm	3 – 3	CSKA Moscow	Perm
16:30 MSK (UTC+4)	Kushev (yellow card) 33' (yellow-red card) 45'; Volkov 35'; Sirakov (yellow card) 51'; Dujmović 60'; Peev 73'	Report	Vágner Love 23'; Rahimić (yellow card) 40'; Mamayev (yellow card) 56'; Krasić (yellow card) 63' (goal) 65', 69'; Zhirkov (yellow card) 73'	Stadium: Zvezda Stadium; Attendance: 19,500; Referee: Vladislav Bezborodov

20 July 2008 14	CSKA Moscow	0 – 2	Moscow	Moscow
16:00 MSK (UTC+4)	Dzagoev (yellow card) 32'; Šemberas (yellow card) 62'	Report	Ivanov 5'; Česnauskis (yellow card) 31'; Rebko (yellow card) 39'; Čížek 70'	Stadium: Luzhniki Stadium; Attendance: 11,000; Referee: Aleksei Nikolaev

26 July 2008 15	Rubin Kazan	0 – 0	CSKA Moscow	Kazan
14:00 MSK (UTC+4)	Ansaldi (yellow card) 45'; Kabze (yellow card) 57'; Sibaya (yellow card) 70'	Report	Zhirkov (yellow card) 26'; V.Berezutski (yellow card) 63'; A.Berezutski (yellow card) 64'	Stadium: Central Stadium; Attendance: 22,300; Referee: Vladimir Pettay

30 July 2008 8	CSKA Moscow	0 – 0	Zenit St. Petersburg	Moscow
19:00 MSK (UTC+4)	Erkin (yellow card) 21'; Dzagoev (yellow card) 31' (yellow-red card) 78'; Dudu (yellow card) 45+'; Krasić (yellow card) 49'; Akinfeev (yellow card) 57'; Rahimić (yellow card) 70'	Report	Križanac (yellow card) 45+' (yellow-red card) 49'	Stadium: Luzhniki Stadium; Attendance: 16,000; Referee: Igor Egorov

3 August 2008 16	CSKA Moscow	0 – 0	Krylia Sovetov Samara	Moscow
19:00 MSK (UTC+4)	Rahimić (yellow card) 41'; Zhirkov (yellow card) 90'	Report	Oh (red card) 33'; R.Ajinjal (yellow card) 90'; Booth (yellow card) 90'	Stadium: Luzhniki Stadium; Attendance: 8,500; Referee: Nikolai Ivanov

10 August 2008 17	Saturn	0 – 4	CSKA Moscow	Ramenskoye
15:00 MSK (UTC+4)	Evseev (yellow card) 8'; Zelão (yellow card) 32' (yellow-red card) 67'; Nemov (yellow card) 36'; Ďurica (yellow card) 52' (yellow-red card) 83'	Report	Mamayev (yellow card) 11' (goal) 50'; Vágner Love 18', 27'; Šemberas (yellow card) 38'; A.Berezutski (yellow card) 86'; Aldonin 90+3'	Stadium: Saturn Stadium; Attendance: 14,000; Referee: Almir Kayumov

17 August 2008 18	CSKA Moscow	2 – 0	Terek Grozny	Moscow
17:30 MSK (UTC+4)	Dzagoev 47'; Ignashevich 70'	Report	Zabavník (yellow card) 24'; Iliev (yellow card) 27'	Stadium: Luzhniki Stadium; Attendance: 8,000; Referee: Stanislav Sukhina

24 August 2008 19	Spartak Nalchik	0 – 0	CSKA Moscow	Nalchik
18:00 MSK (UTC+4)	Mashukov (yellow card) 34'; Félix (yellow card) 45'; Džudović (yellow card) 73'	Report	Dzagoev (yellow card) 52'; A.Berezutski (yellow card) 77'; Odiah (yellow card) 84'; Grigoryev (yellow card) 86'; Šemberas (yellow card) 86'	Stadium: Spartak Stadium; Attendance: 12,000; Referee: Vladislav Bezborodov

30 August 2008 20	Lokomotiv Moscow	0 – 2	CSKA Moscow	Moscow
16:00 MSK (UTC+4)	Gurenko (yellow card) 5' (yellow-red card) 12'; Spahić (yellow card) 7'	Report	Odiah (yellow card) 6'; Zhirkov (yellow card) 18' (goal) 69'; Dzagoev 22' (yellow card) 62'; Šemberas (yellow card) 23'	Stadium: Lokomotiv Stadium; Attendance: 23,500; Referee: Almir Kayumov

14 September 2008 21	CSKA Moscow	4 – 1	Luch-Energiya	Moscow
20:00 MSK (UTC+4)	Šemberas (yellow card) 10'; Dzagoev 37'; Vágner Love 57'; Krasić 78', 90+1'; Mamayev (yellow card) 88'	Report	Vujović (yellow card) 4'; Kristić (yellow card) 23'; Shevchenko 68'	Stadium: Luzhniki Stadium; Attendance: 9,000; Referee: Vitali Doroshenko

21 September 2008 22	Zenit St. Petersburg	1 – 3	CSKA Moscow	Saint Petersburg
16:00 MSK (UTC+4)	Arshavin (yellow card) 34'; Denisov (yellow card) 37'; Puygrenier (yellow card) 56'; Zyryanov (yellow card) 86'; Pogrebnyak 87'	Report	Dzagoev 3', 63'; Mamayev (yellow card) 37'; Akinfeev (yellow card) 61'; Love 57' (pen.); Grigoryev (yellow card) 77' (yellow-red card) 90+'	Stadium: Petrovsky Stadium; Attendance: 22,000; Referee: Stanislav Sukhina

27 September 2008 23	CSKA Moscow	2 – 1	Tom Tomsk	Moscow
19:30 MSK (UTC+4)	Dzagoev (yellow card) 35' (goal) 52'; Aldonin 57'; Vágner Love (yellow card) 85'	Report	Arkhipov 6'; Pareiko (red card) 41'; Vejić (yellow card) 85'; Maznov (yellow card) 87'; Catînsus (yellow card) 89'	Stadium: Luzhniki Stadium; Attendance: 5,000; Referee: Vladimir Pettay

5 October 2008 24	Khimki	1 – 2	CSKA Moscow	Khimki
15:15 MSK (UTC+4)	Trivunović (yellow card) 26'; Radkov (yellow card) 34'; Sabitov (yellow card) 37'; Čeh (yellow card) 76'; Berezutski 90+5' (o.g.)	Report	Berezutski 34'; Aldonin (yellow card) 35'; Šemberas (yellow card) 55'; Mamayev 68'; Vágner Love (yellow card) 76'; V.Berezutski (yellow card) 87'; Rahimić (yellow card) 87'	Stadium: Rodina Stadium; Attendance: 17,000; Referee: Maksim Layushkin

19 October 2008 25	CSKA Moscow	4 – 1	Amkar Perm	Moscow
16:00 MSK (UTC+4)	Dzagoev 45'; Vágner Love 50', 75' (penalty missed) 50'; Ignashevich 90'	Report	Kushev 38' (yellow card) 45'; Cherenchikov (yellow card) 39' (yellow-red card) 49'; Belorukov (yellow card) 51'	Stadium: Luzhniki Stadium; Attendance: 8,000; Referee: Aleksandr Gvardis

27 October 2008 26	Dynamo Moscow	1 – 3	CSKA Moscow	Moscow
19:00 MSK (UTC+3)	Karpovich (yellow card) 45'; Wilkshire 87'	Report	Ignashevich 7'; Šemberas (yellow card) 38'; Aldonin (yellow card) 39'; Vágner Love 58'; Zhirkov 70'	Stadium: Arena Khimki; Attendance: 25,000; Referee: Stanislav Sukhina

1 November 2008 27	CSKA Moscow	0 – 1	Spartak Moscow	Moscow
16:00 MSK (UTC+3)	Zhirkov (yellow card) 84' (yellow-red card) 84'; Šemberas (yellow card) 90'	Report	Rodríguez (yellow card) 41'; Bazhenov 56'; Parshivlyuk (yellow card) 67'	Stadium: Luzhniki Stadium; Attendance: 60,000; Referee: Aleksei Nikolaev

10 November 2008 28	FC Moscow	1 – 4	CSKA Moscow	Moscow
19:00 MSK (UTC+3)	Bystrov (yellow card) 12'; Jop (yellow card) 35'; Samedov (yellow card) 40'; Vukić (yellow card) 45'; Bracamonte 80'	Report	Vágner Love 6', 23', 54', 61' (yellow card) 52'; Ignashevich (yellow card) 42'; Krasić (yellow card) 65'; V.Berezutski (yellow card) 88'	Stadium: Eduard Streltsov Stadium; Attendance: 6,500; Referee: Maksim Layushkin

16 November 2008 29	CSKA Moscow	4 – 0	Rubin Kazan	Moscow
14:00 MSK (UTC+3)	Rahimić (yellow card) 40'; Vágner Love 54', 76', 80' (yellow card) 77'; Dzagoev (yellow card) 67'; Zhirkov 87'	Report	Balyaikin (yellow card) 7'; Noboa (yellow card) 42'; Sharonov (yellow card) 45'; Kobenko (yellow card) 45'; Adamov (yellow card) 45'	Stadium: Luzhniki Stadium; Attendance: 9,500; Referee: Aleksandr Gvardis

22 November 2008 30	Shinnik Yaroslavl	1 – 0	CSKA Moscow	Yaroslavl
14:00 MSK (UTC+3)	Olexici (yellow card) 9'; Buznikin (penalty missed) 12' 35' (pen.); Silva (yellow card) 47'	Report	Šemberas (yellow card) 41'	Stadium: Shinnik Stadium; Attendance: 11,300; Referee: Ildus Beaglov

==== League table ====
Pos	Team	Pld	W	D	L	GF	GA	GD	Pts	Qualification or relegation
1	Rubin Kazan (C)	30	18	6	6	44	26	+18	60	Qualification to Champions League group stage
2	CSKA Moscow	30	16	8	6	53	24	+29	56	Qualification to Champions League group stage
3	Dynamo Moscow	30	15	9	6	41	29	+12	54	Qualification to Champions League third qualifying round
4	Amkar Perm	30	14	9	7	31	22	+9	51	Qualification to Europa League play-off round
5	Zenit St. Petersburg	30	12	12	6	59	37	+22	48 (Note: Zenit St. Petersburg ahead of Krylia Sovetov on head-to-head points; Zenit St. Petersburg–Krylia Sovetov 1–1, Krylia Sovetov–Zenit St. Petersburg 0–3.)	Qualification to Europa League play-off round

Source: RFPL (in Russian)
Rules for classification: 1st points; 2nd matches won; 3rd head-to-head (points, matches won, goal difference, goals scored, away goals scored); 4th goal difference; 5th goals scored; 6th away goals scored; 7th position in previous season or decision game
(C) Champions

=== Russian Cup ===
==== 2007-08 ====
16 April 2008 Semifinals	CSKA Moscow	2 – 1	Tom Tomsk	Moscow
19:00 MSK (UTC+4)	Krasić 14'; Ignashevich 51'	Report	Tarasov (yellow card) 26'; Klimov 27'; Mladenov (yellow card) 43'; Jokić (yellow card) 50'	Stadium: Luzhniki Stadium; Attendance: 5,000; Referee: Vitali Doroshenko

===== Final =====
17 May 2008
15:00 MSK (UTC+4)

CSKA Moscow	2 – 2 (a.e.t.)	Amkar Perm
Vágner Love 65'; Jô 74'	Report	Drinčić 57'; Dujmović 64'
Penalties
Zhirkov (penalty scored); Vágner Love (penalty scored); Jô (penalty scored); Janczyk (penalty scored)	4 – 1	(penalty missed) Drinčić; (penalty scored) Kushev; (penalty missed) Dujmović

Lokomotiv Stadium, Moscow
Attendance: 24,000
Referee: Stanislav Sukhina

CSKA	Amkar

GK	35	(Russia) Igor Akinfeev (c)
DF	2	(Lithuania) Deividas Šemberas
DF	4	(Russia) Sergei Ignashevich	(substituted off) 66'
DF	6	(Russia) Aleksei Berezutski
DF	24	(Russia) Vasili Berezutski
MF	8	(Brazil) Dudu	(yellow card) 6'	(substituted off) 87'
MF	10	(Brazil) Jô
MF	17	(Serbia) Miloš Krasić	(substituted off) 80'
MF	18	(Russia) Yuri Zhirkov	(yellow card) 105'
MF	22	(Russia) Evgeni Aldonin	(substituted off) 61'
FW	9	(Brazil) Vágner Love
Substitutes:
GK	33	(Russia) Yevgeny Pomazan
DF	15	(Nigeria) Chidi Odiah
DF	50	(Russia) Anton Grigoryev
MF	25	(Bosnia and Herzegovina) Elvir Rahimić	(substituted on) 66'
MF	46	(Russia) Alan Dzagoev	(substituted on) 61'
FW	14	(Brazil) Ricardo Jesus
FW	19	(Poland) Dawid Janczyk	(substituted on) 87'
Manager:
(Russia) Valery Gazzaev Assistant referees: Yevgeni Volnin (Vladimir); Viktor Lebedev (Saint Petersburg); Fourth official: Maksim Layushkin (Moscow)

GK	1	(Russia) Vladimir Gabulov
DF	14	(Bulgaria) Zahari Sirakov	(substituted off) 70'
DF	15	(Hungary) Miklós Gaál
DF	21	(Russia) Dmitri Belorukov	(yellow card) 94'
DF	24	(Russia) Aleksei Popov (c)
MF	3	(Russia) Ivan Starkov
MF	7	(Bulgaria) Georgi Peev	(yellow card) 28'	(substituted off) 90'
MF	18	(Montenegro) Nikola Drinčić
MF	22	(Croatia) Tomislav Dujmović	(yellow card) 90'
FW	29	(Bulgaria) Martin Kushev
FW	99	(Serbia) Predrag Sikimić	(substituted off) 76'
Substitutes:
GK	42	(Russia) Sergei Narubin
DF	23	(Russia) Ivan Cherenchikov	(substituted on) 70'
DF	69	(Serbia) Marko Milovanović
MF	10	(Belarus) Mikhail Afanasyev	(substituted on) 90'
MF	77	(Russia) Ildar Akhmetzyanov
FW	19	(Russia) Nikolai Zhilyayev
FW	33	(Serbia) Nenad Injac	(substituted on) 76'	(yellow card) 111'
Manager:
(Montenegro) Miodrag Božović

==== 2008-09 ====
6 August 2008 Fifth round	Torpedo Vladimir	1 – 4	CSKA Moscow	Vladimir
18:00 MSK (UTC+4)	Dubrovin (yellow card) 39'; A.Tyurgashkin (yellow card) 44'; Vyazmikin 50'; Konyukhov (yellow card) 52'	Report	Grigoryev (yellow card) 16'; Erkin 43'; Janczyk 45'; Jesus 52'; Dzagoev 75'	Stadium: Torpedo Stadium; Attendance: 18,000; Referee: Vitali Doroshenko

24 September 2008 Sixth Round	CSKA Moscow	1 – 0	Baltika Kaliningrad	Moscow
19:00 MSK (UTC+4)	Kalouda (yellow card) 36'; Jesus (yellow card) 44'; V.Berezutski (yellow card) 44'; Mamayev (yellow card) 59'; Rahimić (yellow card) 88'; Dzagoev 90' (pen.); Pomazan (yellow card) 90'	Report	Timofeyev (yellow card) 11'; Bondarenko (yellow card) 44'; Andronic (yellow card) 90'	Stadium: Luzhniki Stadium; Attendance: 3,500; Referee: Aleksei Kovalev

Quarterfinal took place during the 2009 season.

=== UEFA Cup ===
==== First round ====
18 September 2008 First Round 1st leg	Slaven Belupo (Croatia)	1 – 2	(Russia) CSKA Moscow	Koprivnica, Croatia
20:30 MSK (UTC+4)	Posavec (yellow card) 14'; Purić (yellow card) 19'; Jurić 43'	Report	Odiah (yellow card) 16'; Ignashevich (yellow card) 57'; Vágner Love 81', 89' (pen.)	Stadium: Gradski Stadion; Referee: David Malcolm (Northern Ireland)

20 September 2008 First Round 2nd leg	CSKA Moscow (Russia)	1 – 0 (3 – 1 agg.)	(Croatia) Slaven Belupo	Moscow, Russia
22:00 MSK (UTC+3)	A.Berezutski 36'; Grigoryev (yellow card) 54'	Report	Nynkeu (yellow card) 34'; Rogulj (yellow card) 90'	Stadium: Luzhniki Stadium; Referee: Iain Brines (Scotland)

==== Group stage ====
Pos	Team	Pld	W	D	L	GF	GA	GD	Pts	Qualification	CSK	DEP	LPO	NAN	FEY
1	(Russia) CSKA Moscow	4	4	0	0	12	5	+7	12	Advance to knockout stage	—	3–0	2–1	—	—
2	(Spain) Deportivo La Coruña	4	2	1	1	5	4	+1	7	Advance to knockout stage	—	—	—	1–0	3–0
3	(Poland) Lech Poznań	4	1	2	1	5	5	0	5	Advance to knockout stage	—	1–1	—	2–2	—
4	(France) Nancy	4	1	1	2	8	7	+1	4		3–4	—	—	—	3–0
5	(Netherlands) Feyenoord	4	0	0	4	1	10	−9	0		1–3	—	0–1	—	—

Source: RSSSF

23 October 2008 1	CSKA Moscow (Russia)	3 – 0	(Spain) Deportivo La Coruña	Moscow, Russia
20:00 MSK (UTC+4)	Dzagoev 9', 12'; Grigoryev (yellow card) 34'; Šemberas (yellow card) 45'; Vágner Love 61'; Aldonin (yellow card) 73'; V.Berezutski (yellow card) 88'	Report	Lopo (yellow card) 72'; López (yellow card) 81'	Stadium: Luzhniki Stadium; Attendance: 13,060; Referee: Alon Yefet (Israel)

6 November 2008 2	Feyenoord (Netherlands)	1 – 3	(Russia) CSKA Moscow	Rotterdam, Netherlands
21:30 MSK (UTC+3)	Van Bronckhorst 29'; Bahia (yellow card) 44' de Cler (yellow card) 90+2'	Report	Van Bronckhorst 14' (o.g.); Vágner Love 40', 81'; Aldonin (yellow card) 57' (yellow-red card) 84'; Rahimić (yellow card) 90'	Stadium: Feijenoord Stadion; Attendance: 25,000; Referee: Svein Oddvar Moen (Norway)

27 November 2008 3	CSKA Moscow (Russia)	2 – 1	(Poland) Lech Poznań	Moscow, Russia
20:00 MSK (UTC+3)	Zhirkov (yellow card) 29' (goal) 45+1'; Dzagoev 31'; Šemberas (yellow card) 56'; Vágner Love (yellow card) 76'	Report	Štilić 66'; Arboleda (yellow card) 78'	Stadium: Luzhniki Stadium; Attendance: 10,800; Referee: Duarte Gomes (Portugal)

4 December 2008 4	Nancy (France)	3 – 4	(Russia) CSKA Moscow	Tomblaine, France
22:45 MSK (UTC+3)	Zerka 5' (yellow card) 48'; André Luiz (yellow card) 45'; Féret 72'; Camerling 79'; Hélder (yellow card) 85'	Report	Vágner Love 23', 62', 88'; Ramón 33'; Šemberas (yellow card) 45'; Zhirkov (yellow card) 47'; Grigoryev (yellow card) 48'	Stadium: Stade Marcel Picot; Attendance: 14,074; Referee: Zsolt Szabó (Hungary)

== Statistics ==
As of match played 4 December 2008

=== Appearances and goals ===
No.	Pos	Nat	Player	Total		Premier League		2007-08 Russian Cup		2008-09 Russian Cup		UEFA Cup	
No.	Pos	Nat	Player	Apps	Goals	Apps	Goals	Apps	Goals	Apps	Goals	Apps	Goals
2	DF	(Lithuania) LTU	Deividas Šemberas	33	0	24	0	2	0	1	0	5+1	0
4	DF	(Russia) RUS	Sergei Ignashevich	36	5	28	4	2	1	0	0	6	0
5	MF	(Brazil) BRA	Ramón	9	1	3+4	0	0	0	0	0	1+1	1
6	DF	(Russia) RUS	Aleksei Berezutski	32	4	24	2	1	0	2	0	5	2
9	FW	(Brazil) BRA	Vágner Love	33	29	26	20	1	1	0	0	6	8
11	MF	(Russia) RUS	Pavel Mamayev	24	2	16+1	2	0	0	1+1	0	2+3	0
14	FW	(Brazil) BRA	Ricardo Jesus	13	1	4+6	0	1	0	2	1	0	0
15	DF	(Nigeria) NGA	Chidi Odiah	25	0	21+2	0	1	0	0	0	1	0
17	MF	(Serbia) SRB	Miloš Krasić	36	7	28	6	2	1	0	0	6	0
18	MF	(Russia) RUS	Yuri Zhirkov	36	4	28	3	2	0	0	0	5+1	1
19	FW	(Poland) POL	Dawid Janczyk	7	1	1+3	0	0+1	0	2	1	0	0
20	MF	(Czech Republic) CZE	Luboš Kalouda	3	0	0+1	0	0	0	2	0	0	0
22	MF	(Russia) RUS	Evgeni Aldonin	34	3	14+11	3	2	0	2	0	5	0
24	DF	(Russia) RUS	Vasili Berezutski	37	0	28	0	2	0	2	0	5	0
25	MF	(Bosnia and Herzegovina) BIH	Elvir Rahimić	32	0	10+13	0	1+1	0	1	0	2+4	0
33	GK	(Russia) RUS	Yevgeny Pomazan	2	0	0	0	0	0	2	0	0	0
35	GK	(Russia) RUS	Igor Akinfeev	38	0	30	0	2	0	0	0	6	0
37	FW	(Russia) RUS	Dmitri Ryzhov	11	0	1+7	0	0	0	0+2	0	0+1	0
42	DF	(Russia) RUS	Georgi Schennikov	4	0	0	0	0	0	2	0	0+2	0
46	MF	(Russia) RUS	Alan Dzagoev	29	13	18+2	8	0+1	0	0+2	2	4+2	3
50	DF	(Russia) RUS	Anton Grigoryev	23	0	14+2	0	0	0	2	0	5	0
88	MF	(Turkey) TUR	Caner Erkin	24	2	2+16	1	0+1	0	1+1	1	2+1	0
Players that left CSKA Moscow on loan during the season:
7	MF	(Brazil) BRA	Daniel Carvalho	5	0	0+4	0	0+1	0	0	0	0	0
Players who appeared for CSKA Moscow that left during the season:
8	MF	(Brazil) BRA	Dudu	12	1	7+3	1	1+1	0	0	0	0	0
10	FW	(Brazil) BRA	Jô	10	4	8	3	2	1	0	0	0	0

=== Goal scorers ===
Place	Position	Nation	Number	Name	Premier League	2007-08 Russian Cup	2008-09 Russian Cup	UEFA Cup	Total
1	FW	(Brazil)	9	Vágner Love	20	1	0	6	27
2	MF	(Russia)	46	Alan Dzagoev	8	0	2	3	13
3	MF	(Serbia)	17	Miloš Krasić	6	1	0	0	7
4	DF	(Russia)	4	Sergei Ignashevich	4	1	0	0	5
5	FW	(Brazil)	10	Jô	3	1	0	0	4
5	MF	(Russia)	18	Yuri Zhirkov	3	0	0	1	4
7	MF	(Russia)	22	Evgeni Aldonin	3	0	0	0	3
8	DF	(Russia)	6	Aleksei Berezutski	2	0	0	0	2
8	MF	(Russia)	11	Pavel Mamayev	2	0	0	0	2
8	MF	(Turkey)	88	Caner Erkin	1	0	1	0	2
11	MF	(Brazil)	8	Dudu	1	0	0	0	1
11	FW	(Poland)	19	Dawid Janczyk	0	0	1	0	1
11	FW	(Brazil)	14	Ricardo Jesus	0	0	1	0	1
11	MF	(Brazil)	5	Ramón	0	0	0	1	1
11				Own goal	0	0	0	1	1
				TOTALS	53	4	'5	12	74

=== Disciplinary record ===
Number	Nation	Position	Name	Premier League		2007-08 Russian Cup		2008-09 Russian Cup		UEFA Cup		Total	
Number	Nation	Position	Name	Booked	Sent off (straight red)	Booked	Sent off (straight red)	Booked	Sent off (straight red)	Booked	Sent off (straight red)	Booked	Sent off (straight red)
2	(Lithuania)	DF	Deividas Šemberas	11	0	0	0	0	0	3	0	14	0
4	(Russia)	DF	Sergei Ignashevich	3	0	0	0	0	0	0	0	3	0
5	(Brazil)	MF	Ramón	1	0	0	0	0	0	0	0	1	0
6	(Russia)	DF	Aleksei Berezutski	3	0	0	0	0	0	0	0	3	0
9	(Brazil)	FW	Vágner Love	4	0	0	0	0	0	1	0	5	0
11	(Russia)	MF	Pavel Mamayev	4	0	0	0	1	0	0	0	5	0
14	(Brazil)	FW	Ricardo Jesus	1	0	0	0	1	0	0	0	2	0
15	(Nigeria)	DF	Chidi Odiah	6	0	0	0	0	0	0	0	6	0
17	(Serbia)	MF	Miloš Krasić	5	0	0	0	0	0	0	0	5	0
18	(Russia)	MF	Yuri Zhirkov	7	1	1	0	0	0	2	0	10	1
20	(Czech Republic)	MF	Luboš Kalouda	0	0	0	0	1	0	0	0	1	0
22	(Russia)	MF	Evgeni Aldonin	6	0	0	0	0	0	3	1	9	1
24	(Russia)	DF	Vasili Berezutski	7	0	0	0	1	0	1	0	9	0
25	(Bosnia and Herzegovina)	MF	Elvir Rahimić	5	0	0	0	1	0	1	0	7	0
33	(Russia)	GK	Yevgeny Pomazan	0	0	0	0	1	0	0	0	1	0
35	(Russia)	GK	Igor Akinfeev	3	0	0	0	0	0	0	0	3	0
37	(Russia)	FW	Dmitri Ryzhov	2	0	0	0	0	0	0	0	2	0
46	(Russia)	MF	Alan Dzagoev	5	1	0	0	0	0	0	0	5	1
50	(Russia)	DF	Anton Grigoryev	1	2	1	0	0	0	2	0	4	2
88	(Turkey)	MF	Caner Erkin	2	0	0	0	0	0	0	0	2	0
Players who left CSKA Moscow during the season:
8	(Brazil)	MF	Dudu	2	0	1	0	0	0	0	0	3	0
			TOTALS	78	2	2	0	8	0	13	1	99	5
