= Jô =

Brazilian footballer (born 1987)

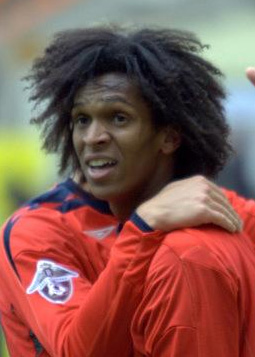
- Jô playing for CSKA Moscow in 2008

Personal information
- Full name: João Alves de Assis Silva
- Date of birth: 20 March 1987 (age 39)
- Place of birth: São Paulo, Brazil
- Height: 1.91 m (6 ft 3 in)
- Position: Forward

Youth career
- 1994–2003: Corinthians

Senior career*
| Years | Team | Apps | (Gls) |
| 2003–2005 | Corinthians | 98 | (14) |
| 2005–2008 | CSKA Moscow | 53 | (30) |
| 2008–2011 | Manchester City | 21 | (1) |
| 2009 | → Everton (loan) | 12 | (5) |
| 2009–2010 | → Everton (loan) | 15 | (0) |
| 2010 | → Galatasaray (loan) | 14 | (3) |
| 2011–2012 | Internacional | 16 | (2) |
| 2012–2015 | Atlético Mineiro | 69 | (17) |
| 2015–2016 | Al Shabab | 13 | (8) |
| 2016 | Jiangsu Suning | 17 | (6) |
| 2017 | Corinthians | 51 | (24) |
| 2018–2020 | Nagoya Grampus | 65 | (30) |
| 2020–2022 | Corinthians | 62 | (15) |
| 2022 | Ceará | 11 | (2) |
| 2023 | Al-Jabalain | 1 | (0) |
| 2024 | Amazonas | 12 | (3) |
| 2024–2025 | Itabirito | 6 | (0) |
| Total | | 531 | (160) |

International career
| 2008 | Brazil U23 | 7 | (3) |
| 2007–2014 | Brazil | 20 | (5) |
Medal record
Men's Football
Representing Brazil
FIFA Confederations Cup
| Winner | 2013 Brazil |
Olympic Games
| Bronze medal – third place | 2008 Beijing | Team |
- * Club domestic league appearances and goals

João Alves de Assis Silva (born 20 March 1987), known as Jô (Brazilian Portuguese: [ʒo]) or João Alves, is a Brazilian former professional footballer who played as a forward.

He has previously played for Corinthians, CSKA Moscow, Manchester City, Everton, Galatasaray, Internacional, Atlético Mineiro and Nagoya Grampus. Jô made his full international debut for Brazil in 2007, and was in the squads which took bronze at the 2008 Olympics and won the 2013 FIFA Confederations Cup, and also played at the 2014 FIFA World Cup.

== Club career ==
=== Corinthians ===
Born in São Paulo, Jô played for Brazilian side Corinthians debuting at the 2003 season at the age of 16, being the youngest football player who ever played and scored a goal for the professional team. He made 54 appearances scoring 23 goals. In late 2005, he was transferred to Russian club CSKA Moscow.

=== CSKA Moscow ===
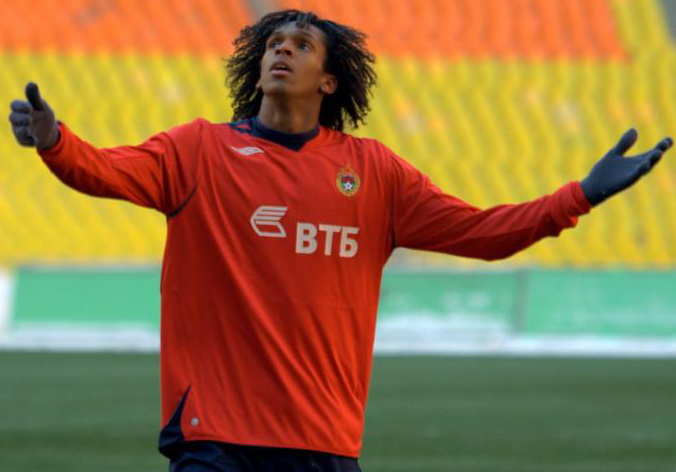
Jô with CSKA Moscow in 2007.

In 2006, Jô became the fourth Brazilian signed by the club within last two years and joined Daniel Carvalho, Vágner Love, and Dudu Cearense.

He scored 14 goals in his first 18 appearances for CSKA Moscow. In the UEFA Champions League, Jô scored two goals in the matches against Inter Milan, one being in a dramatic 4–2 loss at the San Siro. Altogether Jô appeared in 77 games for CSKA Moscow, scoring 44 goals.

=== Manchester City ===
On 31 July 2008, Manchester City signed Jô for an undisclosed value thought to be worth about £19 million, a club record at the time. He scored just one league goal in 4 matches for Manchester City, against Portsmouth, and also scored a brace in the UEFA Cup against Omonia Nicosia. Jô found it difficult to establish himself in the City team and featured in just 6 games at the start of the 2008–09 season.

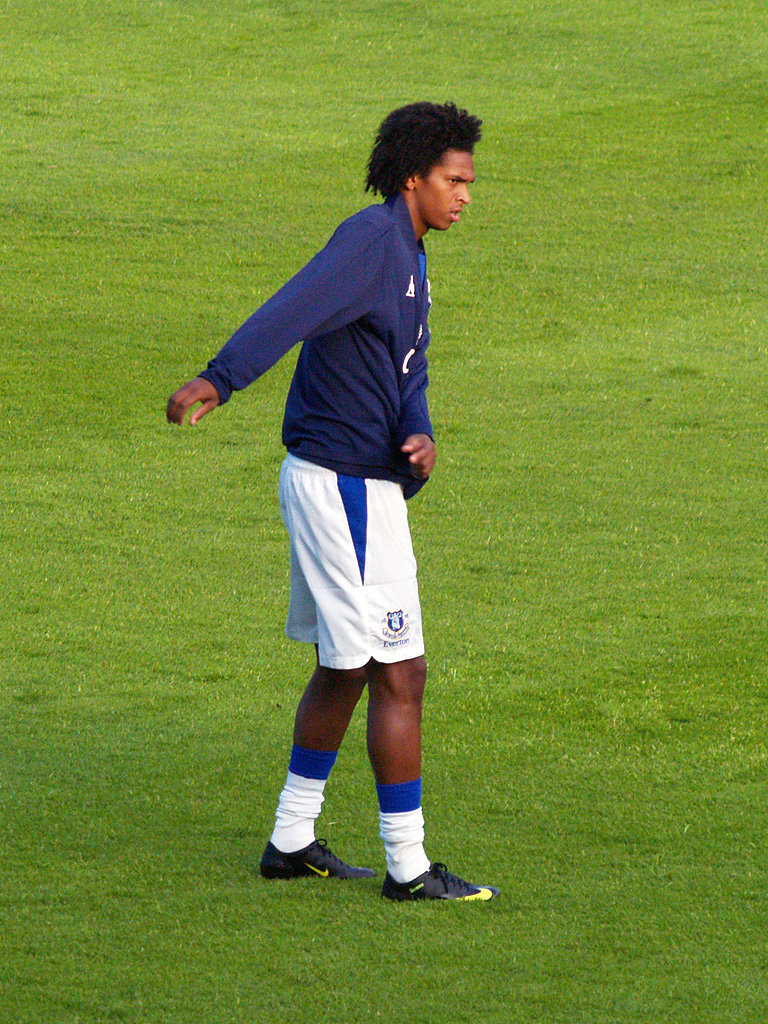
Jô warming up for Everton, before a friendly game against Bury on 10 July 2009.

Jô joined Everton on loan in February 2009, until the end of the 2008–09 season. He made his debut at Goodison Park against Bolton Wanderers, scoring twice in a 3–0 win. He finished the season with five goals from twelve league appearances, though missed out on Everton's run to the 2009 FA Cup Final as he was cup-tied after playing the last 20 minutes of Manchester City's third round defeat to Nottingham Forest.

He returned to Manchester City at the end of the season, but re-joined Everton on a season-long loan for 2009–10, with the option of a permanent move at the end of that period. His first competitive goal in the loan spell was scored against AEK Athens in a Europa League group game, which Everton went on to win 4–0. After returning to Brazil without permission over the Christmas period, Everton manager David Moyes suspended him for a breach of conduct.

After the breach of conduct at Everton, he returned to Manchester City and was loaned to Galatasaray on the very same day. He scored three goals during his loan spell at Galatasaray.

He returned to Manchester City after his loan spell at Galatasaray expired. Jô scored in his first game back against Portland Timbers and was also successful in further pre-season friendlies against New York Red Bulls, Borussia Dortmund and Valencia CF respectively. He then went on to score in the Europa League win against Salzburg and in the League Cup loss to West Bromwich Albion, his fourth and fifth goals for the club.

On 21 November 2010 Jô made a rare start for Manchester City in his team's 4–1 win over Fulham. Jô also featured in Manchester City's 3–1 win away to West Ham before Christmas and scored City's only goal in a 1–1 draw with Juventus in the UEFA Europa League. City won the 2010–11 FA Cup, and despite being left out of the squad for the final, he contributed five appearances earlier in the cup run.

=== Sport Club Internacional ===
On 20 July 2011, following a disappointing spell at Manchester City, only scoring six goals in 41 appearances, Jô decided to return to Brazil and join Sport Club Internacional.

=== Atlético Mineiro ===
In May 2012, Jô signed with fellow Brazilian side Atlético Mineiro, where he formed a striking partnership with Ronaldinho. He won the Campeonato Mineiro and helped the club win its first Copa Libertadores title in 2013, scoring in the final game at Mineirão against Olimpia and finishing as the top scorer in the competition with 7 goals. He also played in both games of Atlético's Recopa Sudamericana win in 2014.

On 4 November 2014, after a string of acts of indiscipline, Jô was reported released from the club by officials. On 10 January 2015, however, he was reinstated to the squad along with Emerson Conceição and André, who had also been suspended, by manager Levir Culpi. On 3 May 2015, after more than 1 year without scoring a single goal, Jô came up as a substitute in the 2015 Campeonato Mineiro final against Caldense and scored the winning goal of the match from an offside position, as Atlético won 2-1 and were crowned champions of the competition for the 43rd time.

=== Al Shabab ===
In July 2015, Jô signed a deal with Emirati club Al Shabab.

=== Jiangsu Suning ===
On 5 February 2016, Jô Joined Jiangsu Suning of the Chinese Super League.

=== Return to Corinthians ===
Jô signed a three-year deal, on 2 November 2016, to mark his return to his first club Corinthians. Despite signing for the club in November 2016, he was only permitted to play from 2017 onwards. In 2017, the Brazilian lived a return full of uncertainties augmented by the media putting pressure on Corinthians that was mocked as being the "fourth force of São Paulo state" and his recent past of exaggerated festivities. However, he answered as a professional player performing many consistent and some delightful matches during season (2017). Jô became known as "Rei dos Clássicos" that could be translated as king of derbys, after scoring decisive goals against all of Corinthians regional rivals.

On 15 November 2017, Jô scored two goals as Corinthians beat Fluminense 3–1. Corinthians obtained its seventh trophy in the competition.

=== Nagoya Grampus ===
On 3 January 2018, Nagoya Grampus announced the signing of Jô. On 24 February, he scored his first goal for the club in a 3–2 win over Gamba Osaka. On 5 August 2018, he scored a hat-trick in a 3-2 win against Gamba Osaka. On 26 August, he scored a hat-trick again in a 4-1 win against Urawa Reds. In August 2018, he scored 10 goals in 5 matches.

=== Later career ===
On 17 June 2020, Corinthians announced the return of Jô for a second spell at the club, with the striker wearing the number 77 in reference to the club’s 1977 Campeonato Paulista title. His third period at Corinthians drew media attention following disciplinary issues, including missed training sessions during the COVID-19 pandemic. In June 2022, after further absences, Jô and the club mutually agreed to terminate his contract.

Later in 2022, he joined Ceará. On 25 January 2023, Jô signed with Saudi Arabian club Al-Jabalain, but the club announced his release five days later.

On 26 February 2023, Jô announced his retirement from professional football at the age of 35. He returned from retirement on 5 January 2024, signing with Amazonas FC, newly promoted to Campeonato Brasileiro Série B. On 30 August 2024, he joined Campeonato Brasileiro Série D side Itabirito FC.

On 13 August 2025, Jô announced his second retirement from professional football.

== International career ==
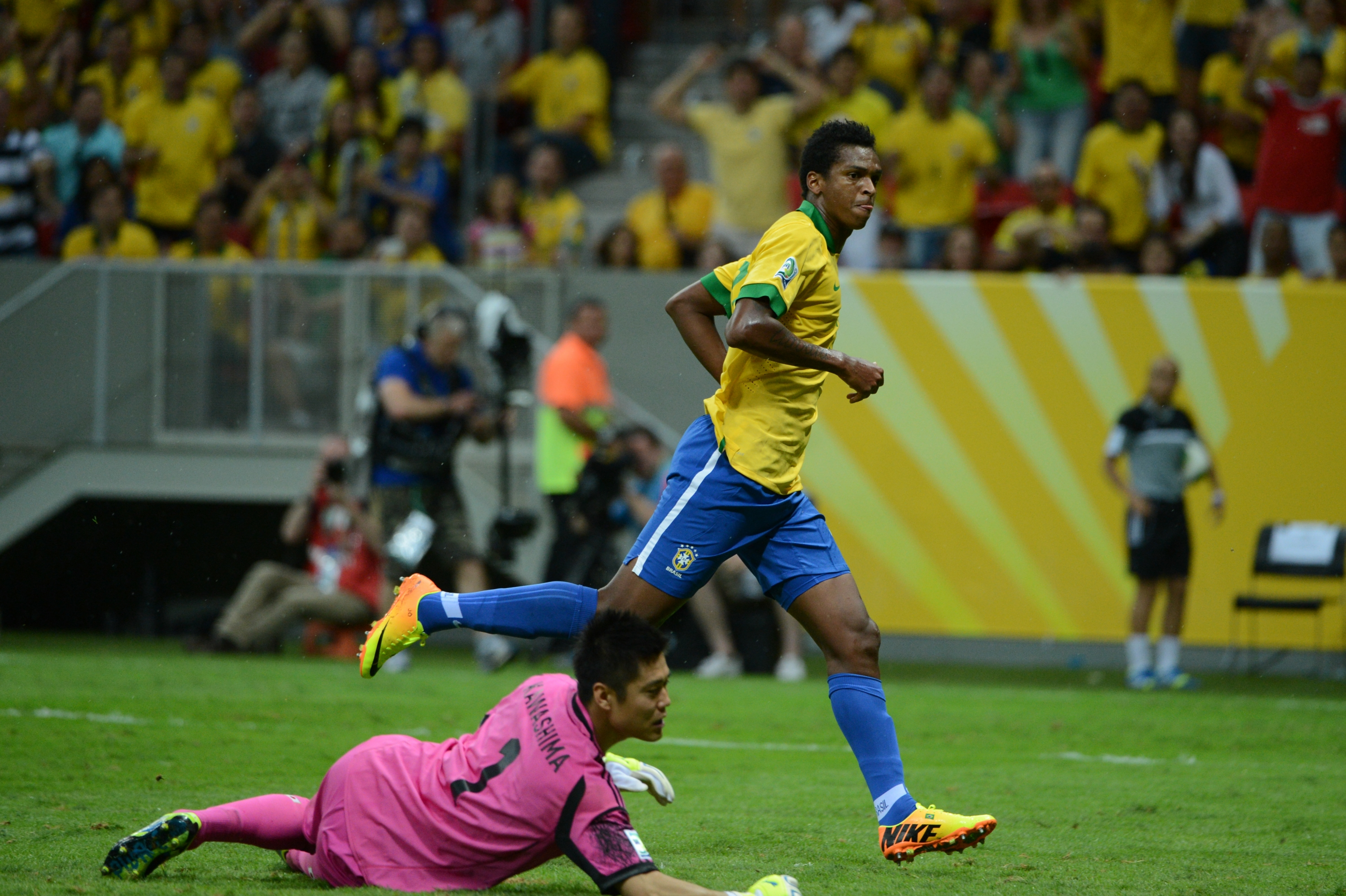
Jô scoring a goal against Japan at the 2013 FIFA Confederations Cup.

Jô received his first call-up to the Brazil national football team in May 2007 and was in the squad to play against England, but did not play. He then made his international debut in a friendly against Turkey, in June 2007 aged 20.

On 7 June 2013, Jô was called to replace Leandro Damião for 2013 FIFA Confederations Cup, who was withdrawn from the original squad due to an injury. In the opening match on 15 June 2013, he scored his first international goal in a 3–0 victory over Japan. He then scored his second goal for Brazil against Mexico on 19 June 2013.

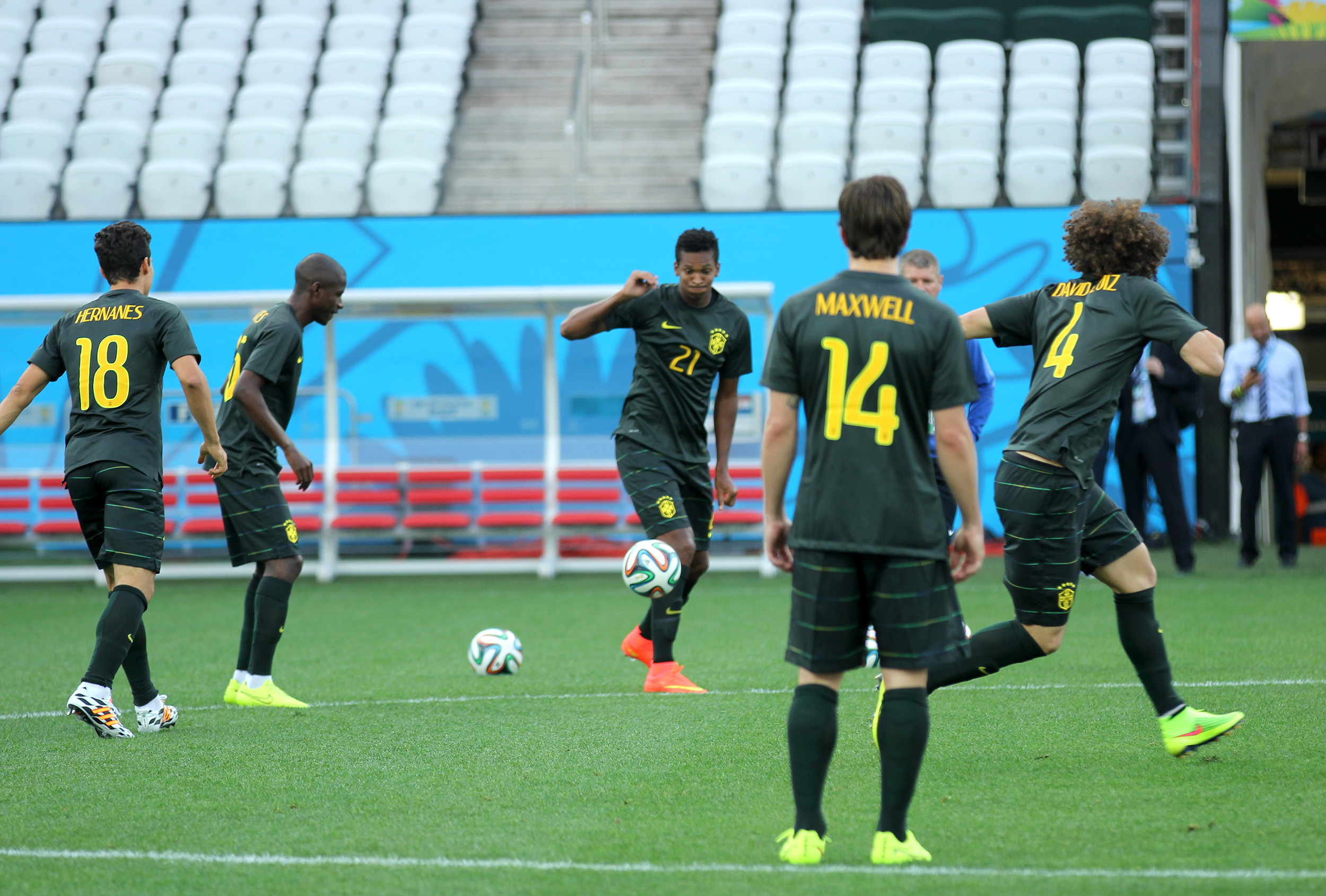
Jô training with Hernanes (left), Ramires, Maxwell and David Luiz before the match against Croatia at the 2014 FIFA World Cup on 11 June.

Jô was selected in the Brazilian squad for the 2014 FIFA World Cup. He made his first appearance in the competition in the second group game, coming on for the last 22 minutes in place of Fred in a goalless draw with Mexico. He made another substitute appearance for the same player in the Round of 16 match against Chile, and played the full 90 minutes of the third-place play-off defeat to the Netherlands.

After Tite was appointed manager of the Brazil national team, Jô believes he can be called up again to Seleção. According to him, it only depends on his working for Corinthians, club where he came back to play for in 2017.

== Career statistics ==
=== Club ===
As of 25 September 2021

Appearances and goals by club, season and competition
| Club | Season | League | | | State league | | National cup (Note: Includes Copa do Brasil, Russian Cup, FA Cup, Turkish Cup, Chinese FA Cup, Emperor's Cup) | | League cup (Note: Includes Football League Cup, UAE League Cup, J.League Cup) | | Continental | | Other | | Total | |
| Club | Season | Division | Apps | Goals | Apps | Goals | Apps | Goals | Apps | Goals | Apps | Goals | Apps | Goals | Apps | Goals |
|---|---|---|---|---|---|---|---|---|---|---|---|---|---|---|---|---|
| Corinthians | 2003 | Série A | 14 | 1 | 0 | 0 | 0 | 0 | – | | 0 | 0 | – | | 14 | 1 |
| Corinthians | 2004 | Série A | 42 | 8 | 5 | 0 | 3 | 2 | – | | 0 | 0 | – | | 50 | 10 |
| Corinthians | 2005 | Série A | 25 | 4 | 12 | 1 | 3 | 1 | – | | 2 | 0 | – | | 42 | 6 |
| Corinthians | Total | | 81 | 13 | 17 | 1 | 6 | 3 | – | | 2 | 0 | – | | 106 | 17 |
| CSKA Moscow | 2006 | Russian Premier League | 18 | 14 | – | | 7 | 7 | – | | 3 (Note: Appearances in UEFA Champions League) | 0 | 1 (Note: Appearance in Russian Super Cup) | 1 | 29 | 22 |
| CSKA Moscow | 2007 | Russian Premier League | 27 | 13 | – | | 4 | 1 | – | | 6 (Note: Four appearances and two goals in UEFA Champions League, two appearances in UEFA Cup) | 2 | 1 | 2 | 38 | 18 |
| CSKA Moscow | 2008 | Russian Premier League | 8 | 3 | – | | 2 | 1 | – | | 0 | 0 | – | | 10 | 4 |
| CSKA Moscow | Total | | 53 | 30 | – | | 13 | 9 | – | | 9 | 2 | 2 | 3 | 77 | 44 |
| Manchester City | 2008–09 | Premier League | 9 | 1 | – | | 1 | 0 | 1 | 0 | 7 (Note: Appearances in UEFA Cup) | 2 | – | | 18 | 3 |
| Manchester City | 2009–10 | Premier League | 0 | 0 | – | | 0 | 0 | 0 | 0 | 0 | 0 | – | | 0 | 0 |
| Manchester City | 2010–11 | Premier League | 12 | 0 | – | | 5 | 0 | 1 | 1 | 6 (Note: Appearances in UEFA Europa League) | 2 | – | | 24 | 3 |
| Manchester City | Total | | 21 | 1 | – | | 6 | 0 | 2 | 1 | 13 | 4 | – | | 42 | 6 |
| Everton (loan) | 2008–09 | Premier League | 12 | 5 | – | | 0 | 0 | 0 | 0 | – | | – | | 12 | 5 |
| Everton (loan) | 2009–10 | Premier League | 15 | 0 | – | | 0 | 0 | 2 | 1 | 7 | 1 | – | | 24 | 2 |
| Everton (loan) | Total | | 27 | 5 | – | | 0 | 0 | 2 | 1 | 7 | 1 | – | | 36 | 7 |
| Galatasaray (loan) | 2009–10 | Süper Lig | 13 | 3 | – | | 2 | 0 | – | | 0 | 0 | – | | 15 | 3 |
| Internacional | 2011 | Série A | 16 | 2 | 0 | 0 | 0 | 0 | – | | 2 (Note: Appearances in Copa Libertadores) | 0 | – | | 18 | 2 |
| Internacional | 2012 | Série A | 0 | 0 | 13 | 3 | 0 | 0 | – | | 5 | 1 | – | | 18 | 4 |
| Internacional | Total | | 16 | 2 | 13 | 3 | 0 | 0 | – | | 7 | 1 | – | | 36 | 6 |
| Atlético Mineiro | 2012 | Série A | 29 | 10 | 0 | 0 | 0 | 0 | – | | 0 | 0 | – | | 29 | 10 |
| Atlético Mineiro | 2013 | Série A | 21 | 6 | 13 | 6 | 2 | 0 | – | | 14 | 7 | 2 (Note: Appearances in FIFA Club World Cup) | 0 | 52 | 19 |
| Atlético Mineiro | 2014 | Série A | 16 | 0 | 9 | 4 | 2 | 0 | – | | 10 | 4 | – | | 37 | 8 |
| Atlético Mineiro | 2015 | Série A | 3 | 1 | 3 | 1 | 0 | 0 | – | | 3 | 0 | – | | 9 | 2 |
| Atlético Mineiro | Total | | 69 | 17 | 25 | 11 | 4 | 0 | – | | 27 | 11 | 2 | 0 | 127 | 39 |
| Al Shabab | 2015–16 | UAE Pro League | 13 | 8 | – | | 0 | 0 | 6 | 8 | – | | – | | 19 | 16 |
| Jiangsu Suning | 2016 | Chinese Super League | 17 | 6 | – | | 3 | 1 | – | | 6 (Note: Appearances in AFC Champions League) | 4 | – | | 26 | 11 |
| Corinthians | 2017 | Série A | 34 | 18 | 17 | 6 | 5 | 1 | – | | 5 (Note: Appearances in Copa Sudamericana) | 0 | – | | 61 | 25 |
| Nagoya Grampus | 2018 | J1 League | 33 | 24 | – | | 1 | 0 | 3 | 1 | – | | – | | 37 | 25 |
| Nagoya Grampus | 2019 | J1 League | 32 | 6 | – | | 0 | 0 | 5 | 2 | – | | – | | 37 | 8 |
| Nagoya Grampus | Total | | 65 | 30 | – | | 1 | 0 | 8 | 3 | – | | – | | 74 | 33 |
| Corinthians | 2020 | Série A | 30 | 6 | 4 | 2 | 0 | 0 | – | | 0 | 0 | – | | 34 | 8 |
| Corinthians | 2021 | Série A | 18 | 5 | 10 | 2 | 4 | 0 | – | | 6 | 1 | – | | 38 | 8 |
| Corinthians | Total | | 48 | 11 | 14 | 4 | 4 | 0 | – | | 6 | 1 | – | | 72 | 16 |
| Career total | | | 457 | 144 | 86 | 25 | 44 | 14 | 18 | 13 | 82 | 24 | 4 | 3 | 691 | 223 |

=== International ===
Appearances and goals by national team and year

| National team | Year | Apps | Goals |
|---|---|---|---|
| Brazil | 2007 | 1 | 0 |
| Brazil | 2008 | 2 | 0 |
| Brazil | 2009 | 0 | 0 |
| Brazil | 2010 | 0 | 0 |
| Brazil | 2011 | 0 | 0 |
| Brazil | 2012 | 0 | 0 |
| Brazil | 2013 | 11 | 5 |
| Brazil | 2014 | 6 | 0 |
| Brazil | Total | 20 | 5 |

Statistics accurate as of match played 12 July 2014

Scores and results list Brazil's goal tally first.

International goals

| No | Date | Venue | Opponent | Score | Result | Competition |
|---|---|---|---|---|---|---|
| 1. | 15 June 2013 | Estádio Nacional Mané Garrincha, Brasília, Brazil | Japan | 3–0 | 3–0 | 2013 FIFA Confederations Cup |
| 2. | 19 June 2013 | Castelão, Fortaleza, Brazil | Mexico | 2–0 | 2–0 | 2013 FIFA Confederations Cup |
| 3. | 7 September 2013 | Estádio Nacional Mané Garrincha, Brasília, Brazil | Australia | 1–0 | 6–0 | Friendly |
| 4. | 7 September 2013 | Estádio Nacional Mané Garrincha, Brasília, Brazil | Australia | 2–0 | 6–0 | Friendly |
| 5. | 10 September 2013 | Gillette Stadium, Foxborough, United States | Portugal | 3–1 | 3–1 | Friendly |

== Honours ==
Corinthians

- Campeonato Brasileiro Série A: 2005, 2017
- Campeonato Paulista: 2017

CSKA Moscow

- Russian Premier League: 2006
- Russian Cup: 2006, 2007–08
- Russian Super Cup: 2006, 2007

Manchester City

- FA Cup: 2010-11

Internacional

- Campeonato Gaúcho: 2012
- Recopa Sudamericana: 2011

Atlético Mineiro

- Copa do Brasil: 2014
- Campeonato Mineiro: 2013, 2015
- Copa Libertadores: 2013
- Recopa Sudamericana: 2014

Brazil U23

- Olympic Men's Football Bronze: 2008

Brazil

- FIFA Confederations Cup: 2013

Individual

- Copa Libertadores Top Scorer: 2013
- Campeonato Paulista Team of the year: 2017
- Bola de Prata: 2017
- Bola de Ouro: 2017
- Campeonato Brasileiro Série A Top Scorer: 2017
- Campeonato Brasileiro Série A Best Player: 2017
- Campeonato Brasileiro Série A Team of the Year: 2017
- J.League Player of the Month: August 2018
- J.League Top Scorer: 2018
- J.League Best XI: 2018
