= Vladislav Rybin =

Russian footballer

Personal information
- Full name: Vladislav Nikolayevich Rybin
- Date of birth: 22 March 1978 (age 48)
- Place of birth: Karsun, Ulyanovsk Oblast, USSR
- Height: 1.73 m (5 ft 8 in)
- Positions: Forward; midfielder

Youth career
- FC Metallurg Tula

Senior career*
Years	Team	Apps	(Gls)
2002–2003	FC Don Novomoskovsk	64	(12)
2004	FC Dynamo Bryansk	38	(0)
2005–2006	FC Don Novomoskovsk	65	(16)
2007–2008	FC Lukhovitsy	46	(8)
2008–2009	FC Zvezda Serpukhov	38	(2)
2010–2013	FC Khimik Novomoskovsk		
2014	FC Shakhtyor Borodinsky		
2015	FC Khimik-2 Novomoskovsk		
- * Club domestic league appearances and goals

Vladislav Nikolayevich Rybin (Russian: Владислав Николаевич Рыбин; born 22 March 1978) is a former Russian professional football player.

== Club career ==
He played in the Russian Football National League for FC Dynamo Bryansk in 2004.
