= Anzor Kunizhev =

Russian footballer

Personal information
- Full name: Anzor Askerbiyevich Kunizhev
- Date of birth: 7 December 1975 (age 50)
- Height: 1.81 m (5 ft 11 1/2 in)
- Position: Forward

Senior career*
Years	Team	Apps	(Gls)
2000	FC Nart Nartkala	19	(8)
2000	PFC Spartak Nalchik	13	(2)
2001	FC Kavkazkabel Prokhladny	37	(20)
2002	FC Terek Grozny	13	(2)
2002–2003	FC Kavkazkabel Prokhladny	53	(28)
2004–2006	PFC Spartak Nalchik	68	(13)
2006	FC Volgar-Gazprom Astrakhan	11	(1)
2007	FC Metallurg Krasnoyarsk	28	(7)
2008	FC Lukhovitsy	18	(6)
2009	FC Mashuk-KMV Pyatigorsk	27	(3)
Total		287	(90)
- * Club domestic league appearances and goals

Anzor Askerbiyevich Kunizhev (Russian: Анзор Аскербиевич Кунижев; born 7 December 1975) is a former Russian professional football player.

== Club career ==
He made his Russian Football National League debut for PFC Spartak Nalchik on 7 August 2000 in a game against FC Zhemchuzhina Sochi. He played 4 seasons in the FNL in his career.
