= Enzo Vagner =

Brazilian footballer (born 2006)

Personal information
- Full name: Enzo Vagner Moraes de Souza
- Date of birth: 28 July 2006 (age 20)
- Height: 1.88 m (6 ft 2 in)
- Position: Forward

Team information
- Current team: Le Mans (on loan from Coritiba)
- Number: 99

Youth career
- Flamengo
- Midtjylland
- 2022–2023: Cruzeiro
- 2023–2025: Sport Recife

Senior career*
Years	Team	Apps	(Gls)
2025	Sport Recife	3	(0)
2026–	Coritiba	4	(0)
2026–	→ Le Mans (loan)	0	(0)
- * Club domestic league appearances and goals as of 17:34, 12 February 2026 (UTC)

Enzo Vagner Moraes de Souza (born 28 July 2006), known as Enzo Vagner or just Enzo, is a Brazilian professional footballer who plays as a forward for Ligue 1 club Le Mans, on loan from Coritiba.

== Career ==
After playing for Flamengo and Midtjylland while his father was playing there, Enzo joined Cruzeiro's youth sides in June 2022, initially for the under-17 team. In August of the following year, he moved to Sport Recife, rejoining his father.

On 30 December 2023, Enzo signed his first professional contract with Sport, agreeing to a two-year deal. He made his first team debut on 11 January 2025, starting in a 1–1 Campeonato Pernambucano away draw against Afogados, as the club fielded an under-20 squad.

On 2 December 2025, Enzo left Sport and signed for Coritiba. On 4 February 2026, after two first team matches, he renewed his link until the end of 2027, and made his Série A debut four days later, coming on as a second-half substitute for Pedro Rocha in a 3–3 away draw against Chapecoense.

On 19 August 2026, Enzo was announced at Ligue 1 side Le Mans on a one-year loan deal.

== Personal life ==
Enzo's father Vágner Love is also a footballer and a forward.

== Career statistics ==
As of 12 February 2026

Appearances and goals by club, season and competition
Club	Season	League			State League		Cup		Continental		Other		Total	
Club	Season	Division	Apps	Goals	Apps	Goals	Apps	Goals	Apps	Goals	Apps	Goals	Apps	Goals
Sport Recife	2025	Série A	0	0	3	0	0	0	—		—		3	0
Coritiba	2026	Série A	1	0	3	0	0	0	—		—		4	0
Career total			1	0	6	0	0	0	0	0	0	0	7	0
