= Ivan Levenets =

Russian footballer

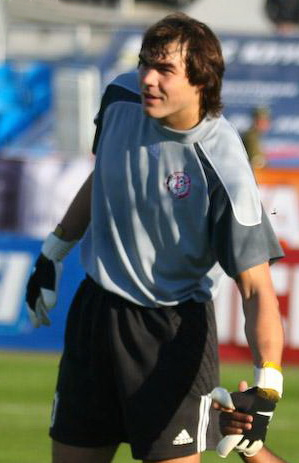
- Levenets in 2007

Personal information
- Full name: Ivan Pavlovich Levenets
- Date of birth: 22 February 1980 (age 46)
- Place of birth: Anapa, Soviet Union
- Height: 1.89 m (6 ft 2 in)
- Position: Goalkeeper

Youth career
- 1995–1998: Zhemchuzhina Sochi

Senior career*
| Years | Team | Apps | (Gls) |
| 1997 | Zhemchuzhina-d Sochi | 5 | (0) |
| 1998 | Anapa | 8 | (0) |
| 1999 | Chernomorets | 2 | (0) |
| 2000 | Chernomorets-2 | 27 | (0) |
| 2001–2003 | Spartak Anapa | 30 | (0) |
| 2004–2007 | Amkar Perm | 58 | (0) |
| 2008–2009 | Lokomotiv Moscow | 12 | (0) |
| Total | | 142 | (0) |
- * Club domestic league appearances and goals

Ivan Pavlovich Levenets (born 22 February 1980) is a Russian former professional footballer who played as a goalkeeper for Lokomotiv Moscow in the Russian Premier League. His previous clubs include FC Amkar Perm, FC Spartak Anapa, Chernomorets Novorossiysk, FC Anapa, Zhemchuzhina Sochi.

== Career statistics ==
Appearances and goals by club, season and competition
| Club | Season | League | | | Cup | | Europe | | Total | |
| Club | Season | Division | Apps | Goals | Apps | Goals | Apps | Goals | Apps | Goals |
|---|---|---|---|---|---|---|---|---|---|---|
| Zhemchuzhina-D Sochi | 1997 | 4th | 5 | 0 | 0 | 0 | 0 | 0 | 5 | 0 |
| Anapa | 1998 | 3rd | 8 | 0 | 0 | 0 | 0 | 0 | 8 | 0 |
| Chernomorets | 1999 | 1st | 2 | 0 | 0 | 0 | 0 | 0 | 2 | 0 |
| Chernomorets-2 | 2000 | 3rd | 27 | 0 | 0 | 0 | 0 | 0 | 27 | 0 |
| Spartak Anapa | 2001 | 3rd | 7 | 0 | 0 | 0 | 0 | 0 | 7 | 0 |
| Spartak Anapa | 2002 | 3rd | 0 | 0 | 0 | 0 | 0 | 0 | 0 | 0 |
| Spartak Anapa | 2003 | 3rd | 23 | 0 | 0 | 0 | 0 | 0 | 23 | 0 |
| Amkar Perm | 2004 | 1st | 0 | 0 | 2 | 0 | 0 | 0 | 2 | 0 |
| Amkar Perm | 2005 | 1st | 14 | 0 | 2 | 0 | 0 | 0 | 16 | 0 |
| Amkar Perm | 2006 | 1st | 14 | 0 | 3 | 0 | 0 | 0 | 17 | 0 |
| Amkar Perm | 2007 | 1st | 30 | 0 | 3 | 0 | 0 | 0 | 33 | 0 |
| Lokomotiv Moscow | 2008 | 1st | 12 | 0 | 0 | 0 | 0 | 0 | 12 | 0 |
| Lokomotiv Moscow | 2009 | 1st | 0 | 0 | 0 | 0 | 0 | 0 | 0 | 0 |
| Career total | | | 142 | 0 | 10 | 0 | 0 | 0 | 140 | 0 |
