= Dmitri Arslanov =

Russian footballer

Personal information
- Full name: Dmitri Rodionovich Arslanov
- Date of birth: 10 February 1990 (age 36)
- Place of birth: Novoorsk, Russian SFSR
- Height: 1.86 m (6 ft 1 in)
- Position: Midfielder

Youth career
- FC Nosta Novotroitsk

Senior career*
Years	Team	Apps	(Gls)
2008	PFC CSKA Moscow	0	(0)
2009	FC Kyzylzhar	9	(1)
2010–2012	FC Nosta Novotroitsk	52	(6)
2013	FC Oktan Perm	12	(1)
2014	FC DSI Komsomolsk-na-Amure		

International career
2006	Russia U16	5	(2)
2007	Russia U17	3	(0)
- * Club domestic league appearances and goals

Dmitri Rodionovich Arslanov (Russian: Дмитрий Родионович Арсланов; born 10 February 1990) is a former Russian professional football player.

== Club career ==
He played in the Kazakhstan Premier League for FC Kyzylzhar in 2009.
