= Mikhail Makagonov =

Russian footballer

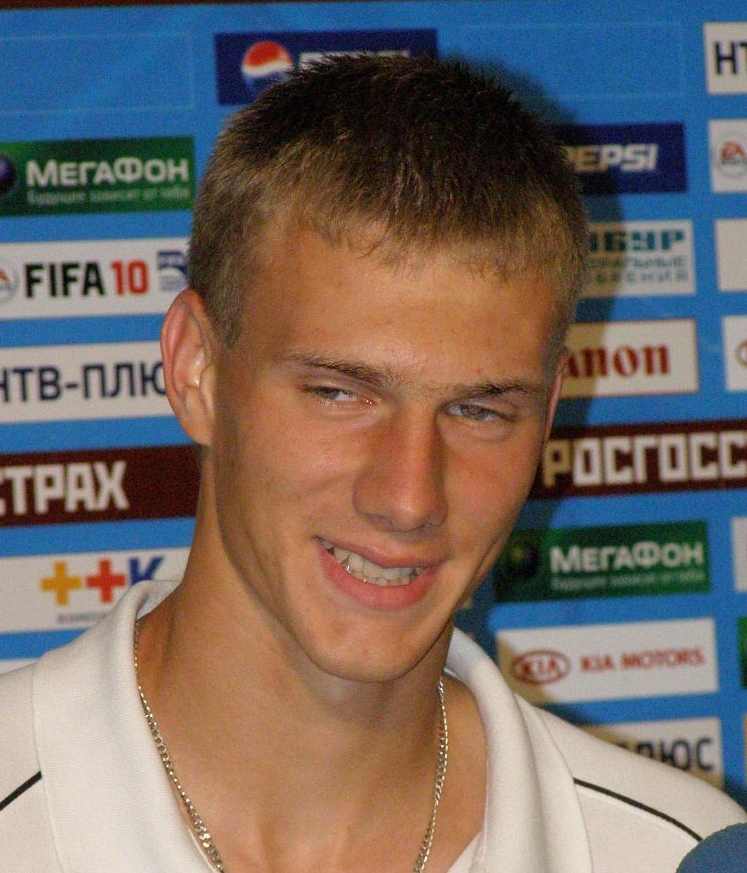

Personal information
- Full name: Mikhail Aleksandrovich Makagonov
- Date of birth: 6 February 1989 (age 37)
- Height: 1.88 m (6 ft 2 in)
- Position: Defender

Youth career
- Chkalovets-Olimpik Novosibirsk

Senior career*
Years	Team	Apps	(Gls)
2007–2012	Amkar Perm	2	(0)
2007	→ Vityaz Podolsk (loan)	6	(0)
2010	→ Dynamo Saint Petersburg (loan)	14	(1)
2011–2012	→ Oktan Perm (loan)	39	(2)
2012–2013	Zenit Izhevsk	23	(1)
2013–2015	Irtysh Omsk	39	(1)
- * Club domestic league appearances and goals

Mikhail Aleksandrovich Makagonov (Russian: Михаил Александрович Макагонов; born 6 February 1989) is a former Russian professional footballer.

== Club career ==
He made his professional debut in the Russian Second Division in 2007 for FC Vityaz Podolsk.
