= Sergei Dubrovin =

Russian footballer and coach

Personal information
- Full name: Sergei Yuryevich Dubrovin
- Date of birth: 25 January 1982 (age 44)
- Place of birth: Tashkent, Uzbek SSR
- Height: 1.78 m (5 ft 10 in)
- Position: Midfielder

Team information
- Current team: Ryazan (assistant coach)

Senior career*
Years	Team	Apps	(Gls)
1999–2000	Torpedo Vladimir	1	(0)
2001	Dinamo Minsk	3	(0)
2002	Uralan Plus Moscow	31	(3)
2003	Lokomotiv Vitebsk	28	(1)
2004–2012	Torpedo Vladimir	240	(6)
2012–2013	Zvezda Ryazan	29	(1)
2013–2016	Torpedo Vladimir	51	(1)

Managerial career
- 2017–2023: Torpedo Vladimir (assistant)
- 2021: Torpedo Vladimir (caretaker)
- 2023: Torpedo Vladimir (caretaker)
- 2023–2024: Torpedo Vladimir
- 2024: Torpedo Vladimir (assistant)
- 2025–: Ryazan (assistant)
- * Club domestic league appearances and goals

Sergei Yuryevich Dubrovin (Russian: Серге́й Юрьевич Дубровин; born 25 January 1982) is a Russian professional football coach and a former player who is an assistant coach with Ryazan.
