= Igor Yermakov =

Russian footballer and coach

Personal information
- Full name: Igor Vasilyevich Yermakov
- Date of birth: 14 June 1977 (age 49)
- Place of birth: Belgorod, Russian SFSR
- Height: 1.78 m (5 ft 10 in)
- Position: Midfielder

Team information
- Current team: FC Salyut Belgorod (assistant coach)

Senior career*
| Years | Team | Apps | (Gls) |
| 1994–1997 | Salyut Belgorod | 107 | (18) |
| 1998–1999 | Fakel Voronezh | 36 | (7) |
| 1999 | Oskol Stary Oskol | | |
| 2000 | Metallurg Lipetsk | 28 | (6) |
| 2001 | Metallurg Krasnoyarsk | 16 | (1) |
| 2001 | Baltika Kaliningrad | 15 | (2) |
| 2002–2003 | Salyut-Energia Belgorod | 67 | (10) |
| 2004 | Darida Minsk Raion | 10 | (0) |
| 2004–2009 | Salyut-Energia Belgorod | 152 | (18) |

Managerial career
- 2010–2012: Salyut Belgorod (assistant)
- 2015–2018: Energomash Belgorod (assistant)
- 2020–: Salyut Belgorod (assistant)
- * Club domestic league appearances and goals

Igor Vasilyevich Yermakov (Russian: Игорь Васильевич Ермаков; born 14 June 1977) is a Russian professional football coach and a former player. He is an assistant coach with FC Salyut Belgorod.

== Club career ==
He played 8 seasons in the Russian Football National League for 5 different clubs.

== Honours ==
- Russian Second Division Zone Center best midfielder: 2004.
