= Ricardo Jesus =

Brazilian footballer

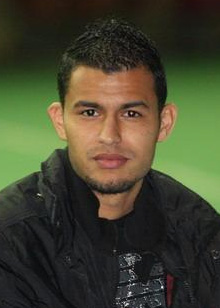

Personal information
- Full name: Ricardo Jesus da Silva
- Date of birth: 16 May 1985 (age 41)
- Place of birth: Campinas, Brazil
- Height: 1.86 m (6 ft 1 in)
- Position: Striker

Senior career*
Years	Team	Apps	(Gls)
2006–2007	Internacional		(0)
2007	Spartak Nalchik	30	(7)
2008–2014	CSKA Moscow	16	(1)
2010	→ AEL (loan)	10	(2)
2010	→ Spartak Nalchik (loan)	6	(0)
2011	→ Ponte Preta (loan)	36	(19)
2012	→ Portuguesa (loan)	9	(2)
2012	→ Avaí (loan)	10	(1)
2013	→ Atlético Goianiense (loan)	24	(6)
2014	Querétaro	18	(6)
2014–2015	Tijuana	10	(2)
2016–2017	Thai Honda Ladkrabang	51	(22)
2017–2018	Al Urooba	0	(0)
2018	Juventude	14	(0)
2019	Tombense	6	(0)
- * Club domestic league appearances and goals

Ricardo Jesus da Silva (born 16 May 1985) is a Brazilian former football striker.

== Career ==
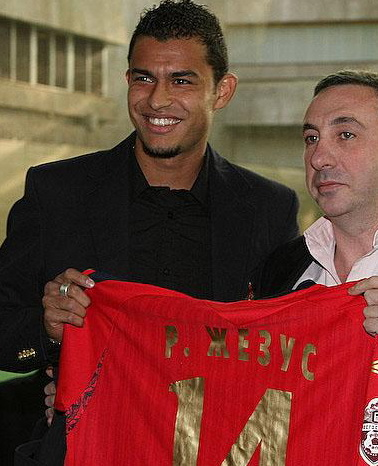
Ricardo Jesus with CSKA Moscow.

Da Silva has played for Sport Club Internacional, PFC Spartak Nalchik and PFC CSKA Moscow.

Several enquiries were made by Italian clubs regarding his availability but CSKA refused to sell.

On 3 January 2010, AEL signed da Silva on loan from PFC CSKA Moscow until the end of the season. He had a very successful spell at Larissa F.C. and became a fans' favourite which led to several Greek teams approaching CSKA to sign the player.

On 21 January 2014, CSKA announced that Da Silva had left them permanently to sign for Querétaro.

== Career honours ==
=== Club ===
CSKA Moscow

- Russian Cup (2): 2007–08, 2008–09
- Russian Super Cup (1): 2009

Thai Honda FC

Thai Division 1 League Champion; 2016

=== Individual ===
- Campeonato Goiano Top Scorer: 2013
