= Vitaliy Shumeyko =

Ukrainian footballer

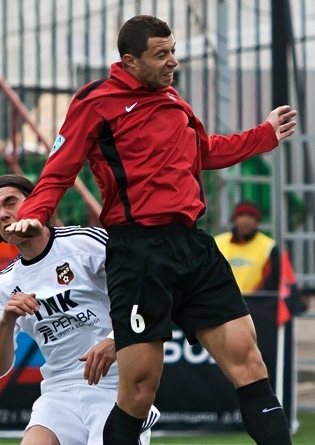

Personal information
- Full name: Vitaliy Leonidovych Shumeyko
- Date of birth: 6 October 1981 (age 45)
- Place of birth: Kryvyi Rih, Soviet Union
- Height: 1.95 m (6 ft 5 in)
- Position: Defender

Senior career*
Years	Team	Apps	(Gls)
1999–2000	FC Kryvbas-2 Kryvyi Rih	4	(0)
2001–2002	FC Elektrometalurh-NZF Nikopol	21	(0)
2002	FC Stal Dniprodzerzhynsk	7	(0)
2003	FC Tytan Armyansk	10	(0)
2004–2006	FC Olkom Melitopol	52	(3)
2006–2007	PFC Olexandria	32	(3)
2007–2009	PFC Spartak Nalchik	22	(3)
2009–2010	FC Atyrau	12	(0)
2010	FC Volgar-Gazprom Astrakhan	5	(1)
2011–2012	FC Khimki	39	(6)
2012–2013	FC Torpedo Moscow	18	(1)
2013	FC Guria Lanchkhuti	1	(0)
- * Club domestic league appearances and goals

Vitaliy Shumeyko (born 6 October 1981) is a former Ukrainian football defender.
