= Vágner Love =

Brazilian footballer (born 1984)

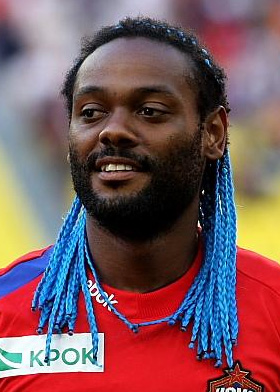
- Vágner Love with CSKA Moscow, 2009

Personal information
- Full name: Vágner Silva de Souza
- Date of birth: 11 June 1984 (age 42)
- Place of birth: Rio de Janeiro, Brazil
- Height: 1.72 m (5 ft 8 in)
- Position: Forward

Youth career
- 2001–2003: Palmeiras

Senior career*
Years	Team	Apps	(Gls)
2002–2004	Palmeiras	42	(27)
2004–2011	CSKA Moscow	158	(79)
2009	→ Palmeiras (loan)	12	(5)
2010	→ Flamengo (loan)	5	(4)
2012–2013	Flamengo	36	(13)
2013	CSKA Moscow	11	(6)
2013–2015	Shandong Luneng	31	(19)
2015–2016	Corinthians	31	(14)
2016	Monaco	12	(4)
2016–2018	Alanyaspor	42	(33)
2018–2019	Beşiktaş	18	(6)
2019–2020	Corinthians	28	(5)
2020–2021	Kairat	36	(14)
2022	Midtjylland	9	(1)
2022–2023	Sport Recife	50	(18)
2024	Atlético Goianiense	6	(1)
2024–2025	Avaí	28	(3)
2025–2026	Retrô	10	(1)
Total		566	(253)

International career^{‡}
2003	Brazil U20	6	(4)
2004–2007	Brazil	20	(4)
Medal record
Men's football
Brazil
Copa América
Winner	2004 Peru
Winner	2007 Venezuela
- * Club domestic league appearances and goals as of 23:59, 24 March 2026 (UTC) ‡ National team caps and goals as of 20 September 2015

Vágner Silva de Souza (born 11 June 1984), known as Vágner Love, is a Brazilian former professional footballer who played as a forward. His nickname name "Love" was given to Vágner while at his first club Palmeiras as he was known for his playboy lifestyle.

He began his career at Palmeiras, making his debut in 2002. He joined Russian club CSKA Moscow in 2004, spending seven years there, as well as another short spell in 2013. Over two spells, Vágner Love scored 124 goals across 256 official games in eight seasons at the club. He won 15 honours, including four league titles and six domestic cups, as well as the 2004–05 UEFA Cup, where he scored in the final to become the youngest player to score in a UEFA Cup final. He represented thirteen other clubs, including Flamengo, Corinthians, Monaco, Beşiktaş, and Alanyaspor. He retired from professional football in 2026 at the age of 41. He scored 403 goals in 892 competitive matches at club level.

Vágner Love played for the Brazil national team between 2004 and 2007, scoring four goals in 20 games, and was part of the squads that won the Copa América in 2004 and 2007.

== Club career ==
=== Palmeiras ===
Vágner Love started his career with Palmeiras. In the 2003 season, he helped them to return to the Série A, the nation's top-flight division, by scoring 19 goals and finishing as Serie B's top scorer.

=== CSKA Moscow ===
In August 2004, Vágner Love transferred to the Russian Premier League club CSKA Moscow, where he joined fellow Brazilian attacking midfielder Daniel Carvalho, who had arrived before the start of season. Upon his arrival, Vagner Love had an immediate impact on the team's performance; on 4 August 2004, his debut game for CSKA Moscow against Neftchi, he came on as a substitute and scored a goal. In the last qualifying round against Glasgow Rangers, Vagner Love scored goals in both legs as CSKA won 3-2 on aggregate and qualified to the Champions League group stage. He also scored 9 goals in the remaining 12 league games, including braces against Rotor Volgograd (3-0), Alania Vladikavkaz (1-4) and FC Moscow (1-4) as the team finished second in a close title race against cross-city rivals Lokomotiv, losing by just one point. He also played in every Champions League group stage game and scored one goal against PSG. In December 2004, CSKA finished third in the group and was relegated to the UEFA Cup knockout stage, where he scored three goals.

At the end of the football season in Russia, Vagner Love was linked with a move to Corinthians due to homesickness and having trouble adjusting to life in Moscow. However, CSKA refused to sell or loan him.

On 18 May 2005, at the age of 20 years, 341 days, Vágner Love scored the final goal in CSKA's 3–1 victory over Sporting CP in the 2005 UEFA Cup Final at the Estádio José Alvalade in Lisbon, making him the youngest player to score in a UEFA Cup final.

He won his second trophy with the Russian club later that month, as CSKA won the 2004–05 Russian Cup. Later that year, the Brazilian striker scored seven times to help his club win the 2005 Russian Premier League title. On 24 November, he scored twice in a 2-1 victory against Levski Sofia, but CSKA were later eliminated from the UEFA Cup group stages.

On 11 March 2006, Vagner participated in the match as CSKA beat crosstown rival Spartak to win the 2006 Russian Super Cup. CSKA's second trophy of 2006 was the Russian Cup, with Vagner scoring in the 3-0 victory against Spartak. CSKA won back-to-back league titles with their 2006 league title, with Vagner scoring nine goals, including a hattrick on 18 November 2006 against Luch-Energia. Despite winning three trophies, Vagner did not score in the Champions League group stage, as CSKA finished third and dropped to the UEFA Cup. He finished the 2006 season with 15 goals in 38 appearances, improving on his previous season total while playing less matches.

Vagner scored and won back-to-back Russian Super Cup titles as CSKA beat Spartak 4-2 to start the 2007 season. Vagner was the club's top scorer in the league, scoring 13 goals as CSKA finished third in the 2007 league season. Despite Vagner's good performances, CSKA had a poor season, being knocked out from the Russian Cup in the sixth round and from the UEFA Cup in the round of 32, also finishing last in their Champions League group, with Vagner scoring three goals in the group stage.

He won his third Russian Cup at the beginning of 2008, scoring during the match and also in the penalty shootout in the final against Amkar Perm.

He was the top scorer in the 2008 season (the first top scorer from outside the former Soviet Union), scoring 20 goals, including hat tricks against Spartak (5-1) and Rubin Kazan (4-0), as well as four goals against FC Moscow (4-1). He was also the top scorer of the 2008–09 UEFA Cup, with 11 goals in 8 games, including a hat-trick in a 4-3 away victory against AS Nancy, despite CSKA's elimination from the competition at the round of 16 stage, losing 2-1 on aggregate at the hands of eventual champion Shakhtar Donetsk.

On 31 May 2009, he won his fourth Russian Cup with the club. In the semi-finals, he scored an important goal and then his penalty in the shootout against Dynamo Moscow to help CSKA progress to the finals. He played in the final against Rubin Kazan as his club won 1-0 with a last minute goal from Evgeni Aldonin.

==== Return to Palmeiras on loan ====
On 28 August 2009, Vágner Love was signed by his former club Palmeiras on a one-year loan deal until 31 July 2010. CSKA press spokesman Sergei Aksenov claimed that Vágner Love left Russia due to "urgent family problems demand(ing) his presence at home in Brazil".

Vágner Love had a respectable return of 5 goals in 12 games for Palmeiras, but his loan spell was ended prematurely after suffering an attack by Palmeiras fans outside a bank in São Paulo on 1 December 2009, just days after scoring in the 37th round of the Brazilian championship, a 3-1 victory against Atletico-MG. This incident, combined with his desire to play for his childhood team Flamengo, led to his spell at the club being ended early on 14 January 2010, with the player stating the primary reason for the move being that he felt unsafe in São Paulo.

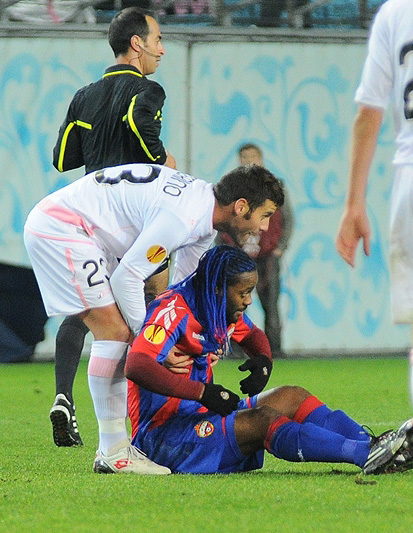
Antonio Nocerino and Vágner Love

=== Flamengo ===
On 15 January 2010, the day after his loan was terminated with Palmeiras, Vágner Love officially signed a short-loan deal with reigning Brazilian champions Flamengo until July 2010. He made his Flamengo debut against Bangu in the Campeonato Carioca on 23 January 2010, scoring two goals.

Vágner Love performed very well playing for Flamengo, scoring 23 goals in 26 matches. His successful strike partnership with Adriano was dubbed by fans as "Império do Amor", or "The Love Empire", in reference to Adriano's nickname "The Emperor" and Vágner Love's artistic surname. The presence of midfielder Dejan Petković in Flamengo's squad made supporters start the year with high expectations—it was widely believed that the Serbian's passing and free-kick abilities, coupled with Adriano's and Vagner's prolific scoring, would produce a top team. However, the team failed to advance past the quarter-finals in the 2010 Copa Libertadores, and finished in the bottom half of the table in the Série A. Shortly after, Adriano revealed he wanted to try playing in Italy again, and Flamengo could not convince CSKA to extend Vágner Love's loan, thus dismantling the once-promising "Love Empire".

In July 2010, Vagner returned to CSKA. He scored two goals in the Europa League group stages, but was unable to make an impact in the later rounds, playing both legs as CSKA lost to FC Porto 3-1 on aggregate. On 11 May 2011, in the Russian Cup semi-finals, Vagner Love scored a goal to tie the match at 3-3 against rivals Spartak, and then scored in the penalty shootout to help his club qualify for the final. In the final less than two weeks later, he won his fifth Russian Cup with the club, playing in the 2-1 victory over Alania Vladikavkaz.

On 25 January 2012, he officially signed with Flamengo. He scored 13 goals in 36 appearances in the 2012 Brazilian Championship, and two goals in the 2012 Copa Libertadores, one of them being a game winner in a home victory over Emelec.

=== Return to CSKA ===
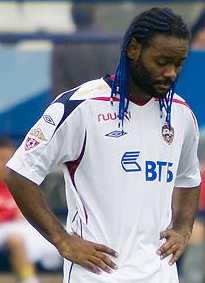
Love playing for CSKA

After a change of presidency, on 12 January 2013, Flamengo did not pay his pendencies of rights with CSKA, and Vágner Love had to leave the club, returning to Russia after a one-year absence. On 16 January, he was "re-presented" in Moscow and signed a three-year contract extension. He continued his goal scoring record with CSKA on his return to the club, and propelled the club to the Premier League title in 2013 after a goalless draw with Kuban Krasnodar on 18 May, the club's first league title since 2006.

=== Shandong Luneng ===
On 24 July 2013, Vágner Love transferred to Chinese Super League side Shandong Luneng in a reported €12 million transfer.

=== Corinthians ===
On 8 February 2015, Vágner Love rescinded his contract with Shandong Luneng and signed with Corinthians in Brazil. He went on to become the top scorer of the club during the national championship as Corinthians went on to win the Série A that year.

=== Monaco ===
On 13 January 2016, Ligue 1 club Monaco announced the signing of Vágner Love on an 18-month deal for a €1 million transfer fee. On 20 March, he opened the scoring in an eventual 2–0 win against Paris Saint-Germain, the Parisian club's first home defeat since May 2014.

=== Alanyaspor ===
On 30 August 2016, Süper Lig club Alanyaspor reached an agreement with Monaco for the transfer of Love. On 31 August 2016, he was officially presented after passed the medical. Having failed to score in his first seven appearances for the club, Love scored 23 goals in 20 matches that followed to earn the Golden Boot award.

=== Beşiktaş ===
On 26 January 2018, Süper Lig club Beşiktaş reached an agreement with fellow Turkish side Alanyaspor for the transfer of Love.

=== Return to Corinthians ===
On 25 January 2019, Love returned to Corinthians on a deal until the end of 2020 after rescinding his contract with Beşiktaş. He rescinded his contract in June 2020.

=== Kairat ===
On 8 July 2020, Kazakhstan Premier League club FC Kairat announced the signing of Vágner Love on a six-month contract, with the option to extend it. On 3 November 2020, Love scored Kairat's first goal, in a 3–1 win over Ordabasy, to clinch their first Kazakhstan Premier League title since 2004. On 5 November 2020, Kairat extended their contract with Vágner Love until the end of the 2021 season.

=== Midtjylland ===
On 20 January 2022, Love signed an agreement to join Midtjylland on a free transfer, with a contract lasting until the end of the 2021/22 season. On 22 May 2022 Midtjylland confirmed, that Love was one out of seven players, whose contracts had come to an end, and therefore would leave the club.

=== Sport Recife ===
On 26 July 2022, Love returned to Brazil after two years, joining Série A side Sport Recife until the end of the year.

On 6 January 2023, the forward renewed his contract with the club for another season.

=== Atlético Goianiense ===
On 5 January 2024, Love signed a one-year contract with recently-promoted Série A club Atlético Goianiense.

=== Retirement ===
On 28 March 2026, Vágner Love officially announced his retirement from professional football in a match between Retrô and Ceará for the Copa do Nordeste. On 26 September 2026, his testimonial game was played in Moscow at the VEB Arena.

== International career ==
Vágner Love earned his first call up for the Brazil national football team for the 2004 Copa América, in a squad without the main stars to give them rest after the end of the 2003–04 season. He made his debut as a substitute in the 4–1 win against Costa Rica, which was his single appearance as Brazil went on to win the competition.

He did not make the final 23-man squad for the 2006 FIFA World Cup in Germany. Following the tournament, Vágner Love was named in new manager Dunga's first squad for the national team and scored his first goal for the Seleção in the same year, against Wales.

The following year, he was included in Brazil's squad for the 2007 Copa América. On 7 July 2007, he scored the final goal in a 6–1 win against Chile in the quarter-finals of the competition. He played his last match for the national team in that year, against Uruguay. Over the course of his international career, he amassed 20 caps and scored 4 goals.

== Personal life ==
Vágner Love's son Enzo is also a footballer and a forward.

== Career statistics ==
=== Club ===
As of match played 26 February 2026

Appearances and goals by club, season and competition
Club	Season	League			State league (Note: Includes Campeonato Paulista, Campeonato Carioca, Campeonato Goiano, Campeonato Pernambucano, Campeonato Catarinense)		National cup (Note: Includes Copa do Brasil, Russian Cup, Chinese FA Cup, Coupe de France, Turkish Cup, Kazakhstan Cup)		Continental		Other		Total	
Club	Season	Division	Apps	Goals	Apps	Goals	Apps	Goals	Apps	Goals	Apps	Goals	Apps	Goals
Palmeiras	2002	Série A	2	0	0	0	–		–		–		2	0
Palmeiras	2003	Série B	29	19	2	0	1	2	–		–		32	21
Palmeiras	2004	Série A	11	8	12	12	7	6	–		–		30	26
Palmeiras	Total		42	27	14	12	8	8	–		–		64	47
CSKA Moscow	2004	Russian Premier League	12	9	–		0	0	9 (Note: Appearances in UEFA Champions League)	4	0 (Note: Appearance in Russian Super Cup)	0	21	13
CSKA Moscow	2005	Russian Premier League	21	7	–		7	0	14 (Note: Appearances in UEFA Cup)	7	1 (Note: Appearance in UEFA Super Cup)	0	43	14
CSKA Moscow	2006	Russian Premier League	23	9	–		7	4	7	2	1	0	38	15
CSKA Moscow	2007	Russian Premier League	23	13	–		1	0	3	3	1	1	28	17
CSKA Moscow	2008	Russian Premier League	26	20	–		1	1	6	8	–		33	29
CSKA Moscow	2009	Russian Premier League	13	3	–		3	1	4	3	1	0	21	7
CSKA Moscow	2010	Russian Premier League	15	9	–		0	0	5 (Note: Appearances in UEFA Europa League)	2	0	0	20	11
CSKA Moscow	2011–12	Russian Premier League	25	9	–		5	1	9 (Note: Six appearances and one goal in UEFA Champions League, three appearances in UEFA Europa League)	1	1	0	40	11
CSKA Moscow	Total		158	79	–		24	7	57	30	5	1	244	117
Palmeiras (loan)	2009	Série A	12	5	0	0	—		0 (Note: Appearance in Copa Libertadores)	0	—		12	5
Flamengo (loan)	2010	Série A	5	4	14	15	—		10	4	—		29	23
Flamengo	2012	Série A	36	13	10	9	—		5	2	—		51	24
CSKA Moscow	2012–13	Russian Premier League	9	5	–		3	1	0	0	–		12	6
CSKA Moscow	2013–14	Russian Premier League	2	1	–		0	0	0	0	1	0	3	1
CSKA Moscow	Total		11	6	–		3	1	0	0	1	0	15	7
Shandong Luneng Taishan	2013	Chinese Super League	10	6	–		0	0	–		–		10	6
Shandong Luneng Taishan	2014	Chinese Super League	21	13	–		7	4	5 (Note: Appearances in AFC Champions League)	5	–		33	22
Shandong Luneng Taishan	Total		31	19	–		7	4	5	5	–		43	28
Corinthians	2015	Série A	31	14	14	2	2	0	3	0	—		50	16
Monaco	2015–16	Ligue 1	12	4	—		1	0	0	0	—		13	4
Alanyaspor	2016–17	Süper Lig	28	23	–		0	0	–		–		28	23
Alanyaspor	2017–18	Süper Lig	14	10	–		2	1	–		–		16	11
Alanyaspor	Total		42	33	–		2	1	–		–		44	34
Beşiktaş	2017–18	Süper Lig	10	3	–		1	0	2	1	–		13	4
Beşiktaş	2018–19	Süper Lig	8	3	–		0	0	8	4	–		16	7
Beşiktaş	Total		18	6	–		1	0	10	5	–		29	11
Corinthians	2019	Série A	28	5	15	1	8	1	10 (Note: Appearance in Copa Sudamericana)	4	–		59	11
Corinthians	2020	Série A	0	0	6	1	–		1	0	–		7	1
Corinthians	Total		28	5	21	2	8	1	11	4	–		62	12
Kairat	2020	Kazakhstan Premier League	14	7	—		0	0	2	3	—		16	10
Kairat	2021	Kazakhstan Premier League	22	7	—		6	5	12 (Note: Four appearances and one goal in UEFA Champions League, two appearances in UEFA Europa League, six appearances and four goals in the UEFA Europa Conference League)	5	2 (Note: Appearances in Kazakhstan Super Cup)	0	42	17
Kairat	Total		36	14	—		6	5	14	8	2	0	58	27
Midtjylland	2021–22	Danish Superliga	9	1	—		0	0	0	0	—		9	1
Sport Recife	2022	Série B	17	7	—		—		—		—		17	7
Sport Recife	2023	Série B	33	11	12	5	3	2	—		11 (Note: Appearances in Copa do Nordeste)	5	59	23
Sport Recife	Total		50	18	12	5	3	2	—		11	5	76	30
Atlético Goianiense	2024	Série A	6	1	15	6	2	0	0	0	—		23	7
Avaí	2024	Série B	24	3	0	0	0	0	0	0	—		24	3
Avaí	2025	Série B	5	0	13	2	0	0	0	0	—		18	2
Avaí	Total		29	3	13	2	0	0	0	0	—		42	5
Retrô	2025	Série C	10	1	0	0	2	0	0	0	—		12	1
Retrô	2026	Série D	0	0	9	3	1	0	0	0	—		10	3
Retrô	Total		10	1	9	3	3	0	0	0	—		22	4
Career total			566	253	122	56	70	29	120	60	14	5	892	403

=== International ===
As of 1 April 2009

Appearances and goals by national team and year
National team	Year	Apps	Goals
Brazil	2004	1	0
Brazil	2005	0	0
Brazil	2006	3	1
Brazil	2007	16	3
Total		20	4

Scores and results list Brazil's goal tally first, score column indicates score after each Vágner Love goal.

List of international goals scored by Vágner Love
No.	Date	Venue	Opponent	Score	Result	Competition
1	5 September 2006	White Hart Lane, London, England	Wales	1–0	2–0	Friendly
2	27 March 2007	Råsunda Stadium, Solna, Sweden	Ghana	1–0	1–0	Friendly
3	7 July 2007	Estadio José Antonio Anzoátegui, Puerto La Cruz, Venezuela	Chile	6–1	6–1	2007 Copa América
4	17 October 2007	Maracanã Stadium, Rio de Janeiro, Brazil	Ecuador	1–0	5–0	2010 FIFA World Cup qualification

== Honours ==
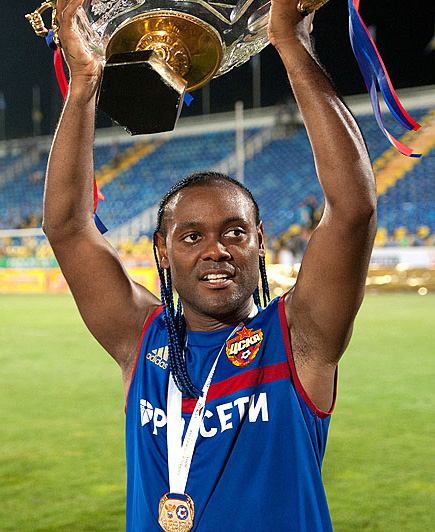
Vágner Love after winning the 2013 Russian Super Cup with CSKA

Palmeiras

- Campeonato Brasileiro Série B: 2003

CSKA Moscow

- Russian Premier League: 2005, 2006, 2012–13, 2013–14
- Russian Cup: 2004–05, 2005–06, 2007–08, 2008–09, 2010–11, 2012–13
- Russian Super Cup: 2006, 2007, 2009, 2013
- UEFA Cup: 2004–05

Shandong Luneng

- Chinese FA Cup: 2014

Corinthians

- Campeonato Brasileiro Série A: 2015
- Campeonato Paulista: 2019

Kairat

- Kazakhstan Premier League: 2020
- Kazakhstan Cup: 2021

Midtjylland

- Danish Cup: 2021–22

Sport

- Campeonato Pernambucano: 2023

Atlético Goianiense

- Campeonato Goiano: 2024

Avaí

- Campeonato Catarinense: 2025

Brazil

- Copa América: 2004, 2007

Individual

- Campeonato Brasileiro Série B top scorer: 2003
- Pan American Games top scorer: 2003
- Campeonato Paulista top scorer: 2004
- Russian Premier League top scorer: 2008
- Sport-Express's Russian Footballer of the Year: 2008
- Russian Premier League Team of the Year: 2008, 2012–13
- UEFA Cup top scorer: 2008–09
- Campeonato Carioca top scorer: 2010
- Russian Premier League Player of the Month: March 2013, May 2013
- Süper Lig top scorer: 2016–17
- Süper Lig Team of the Season: 2016–17
