= Dawid Janczyk =

Polish footballer (born 1987)

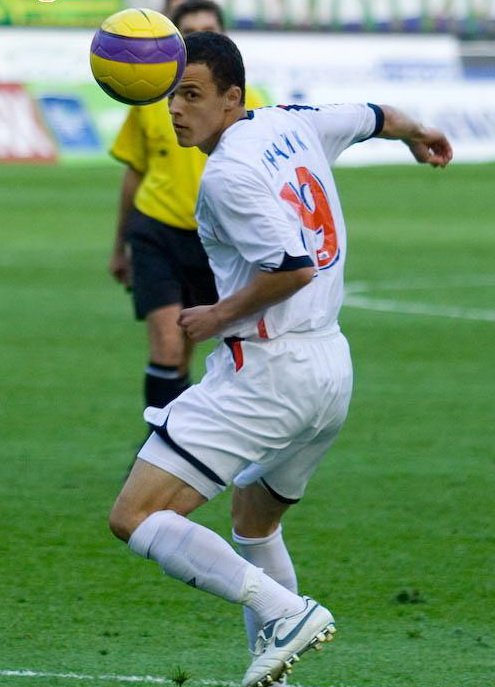
- Janczyk with CSKA Moscow in 2007

Personal information
- Full name: Dawid Janczyk
- Date of birth: 23 September 1987 (age 39)
- Place of birth: Nowy Sącz, Poland
- Height: 1.81 m (5 ft 11 in)
- Position: Striker

Youth career
- Sandecja Nowy Sącz

Senior career*
Years	Team	Apps	(Gls)
2004–2005	Sandecja Nowy Sącz		
2005–2007	Legia Warsaw	42	(9)
2007–2013	CSKA Moscow	14	(2)
2009–2010	→ Lokeren (loan)	31	(14)
2010	→ Germinal Beerschot (loan)	12	(3)
2011	→ Korona Kielce (loan)	7	(0)
2011	→ Oleksandriya (loan)	3	(0)
2014–2015	Piast Gliwice	3	(0)
2014	Piast Gliwice II	13	(4)
2016–2017	Sandecja Nowy Sącz	8	(2)
2018	Weszło Warsaw	0	(0)
2018–2019	Odra Wodzisław	5	(2)
2019	FC Blaubeuren	3	(0)
2020	MKS Ciechanów	0	(0)
2020–2021	LZS Piotrówka	23	(23)
2021	Korona Wilkowice	10	(9)
2022	Górnik 09 Mysłowice	9	(5)
2022–2023	Sadownik Waganiec	9	(3)
2023	GKS Raciborowice	16	(26)
2024	Babia Góra Lipnica Wielka	9	(2)
2024–2025	GKS Raciborowice	7	(2)
2025	Jeziorak Iława	3	(2)

International career
2005	Poland U18	9	(7)
2005–2006	Poland U19	8	(10)
2007	Poland U20	9	(5)
2006–2008	Poland U21	7	(0)
2008–2009	Poland	5	(0)
- * Club domestic league appearances and goals as of 21:30, 30 June 2026 (UTC)

Dawid Janczyk (Polish pronunciation: [ˈdavid ˈjant͡ʂɨk]; born 23 September 1987) is a Polish footballer who plays as a striker.

== Club career ==
Janczyk began his career at Sandecja Nowy Sącz. In 2005, he joined Legia Warsaw in the Ekstraklasa.

On 12 July 2007, he signed a five-year contract with CSKA Moscow, having impressed the club's scout at the 2007 FIFA U-20 World Cup. He scored his first goal for the Russian side on 8 August 2007 in a 2–0 Russian Cup win against FC Khimki. His first league goal came on 2 September 2007 to earn a 1–1 tie against FC Spartak Moscow. On 23 October 2007, he made his first appearance in the UEFA Champions League, coming on in the 76th minute of a 1–2 loss against Internazionale. He won the 2007–08 Russian Cup with CSKA, converting his penalty during the penalty shootout. As of January 2009, all of his appearances in the Russian league have been off the bench.

In January 2009, he joined KSC Lokeren on loan until the end of the season. He scored on his debut for Lokeren on 14 February, leading to a 2–1 win against K.S.V. Roeselare. In March 2009, the loan was extended until the end of the 2009–10 season, with CSKA Moscow having the right to recall Janczyk during the winter. In January 2010, he joined Germinal Beerschot on loan until June 2011 with a buy option.

In November 2010, he and Germinal agreed by mutual consent to end his loan agreement early, the manager having given him no playing time in the 2010–11 season. With CSKA Moscow's consent, he began training at Legia Warsaw. In February 2012, he played in a trial game for Irish side Limerick and scored a goal.

In 2018, he joined the amateur club, Weszło Warsaw. In October 2018, he joined Odra Wodzisław and played until 19 April 2019. After a spell at MKS Ciechanów from February to July 2020, Janczyk moved to Polish amateur club LZS Piotrówka.

== International career ==
He has also represented Poland at the junior level, scoring a hat-trick against Belgium at the 2006 UEFA U-19 Championship. At the 2007 FIFA U-20 World Cup, he notched three goals in four games.

In April 2008, the Poland national team coach Leo Beenhakker named Janczyk in a preliminary group of 31 players for the UEFA Euro 2008. However, Janczyk did not make the cut when the group was reduced to the final squad of 23. He made his first appearance for the Poland during a friendly against Serbia in December 2008.

== Personal life ==
Janczyk and fiancée, Dominika, have a daughter, Wiktoria, born in 2010.

== Career statistics ==
=== International ===
Appearances and goals by national team and year
National team	Year	Apps	Goals
Poland
Poland	2008	1	0
Poland	2009	4	0
Total		5	0

== Honours ==
Legia Warsaw

- Ekstraklasa: 2005–06

CSKA Moscow

- Russian Cup: 2007–08, 2008–09
