= Marko Milovanović (footballer, born 1982) =

Serbian footballer

Personal information
- Full name: Marko Milovanović
- Date of birth: 12 August 1982 (age 44)
- Place of birth: Valjevo, SFR Yugoslavia
- Height: 1.91 m (6 ft 3 in)
- Position: Defender

Senior career*
Years	Team	Apps	(Gls)
2001–2003	Kolubara	21	(0)
2003–2005	Javor Ivanjica	45	(0)
2005–2006	Smederevo	22	(3)
2006	Tavriya Simferopol	4	(0)
2007–2008	Amkar Perm	2	(0)
2009–2011	Javor Ivanjica	79	(2)
2012	Okzhetpes	18	(0)
2013–2014	Kolubara	30	(2)
Total		221	(7)

Managerial career
- 2017: Kolubara
- * Club domestic league appearances and goals

Marko Milovanović (Serbian Cyrillic: Марко Миловановић; born 12 August 1982) is a Serbian former professional footballer who played as a defender.

== Honours ==
Kolubara

- Serbian League Belgrade: 2013–14
