= Nazir Kazharov =

Russian footballer

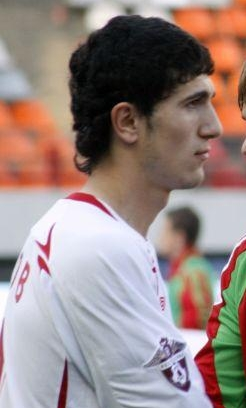

Personal information
- Full name: Nazir Yuryevich Kazharov
- Date of birth: 12 January 1987 (age 39)
- Place of birth: Nartkala, Russian SFSR
- Height: 1.78 m (5 ft 10 in)
- Positions: Forward; midfielder

Youth career
- 2001: FC Aruan Nartkala
- 2002–2004: FC Lokomotiv Moscow

Senior career*
Years	Team	Apps	(Gls)
2005	FC Lokomotiv Kaluga	4	(0)
2005–2006	FC Sportakademklub Moscow	27	(10)
2006	→ Olympique de Marseille (B team) (loan)		
2007–2009	PFC Spartak Nalchik	27	(3)
2009	→ FC Anzhi Makhachkala (loan)	13	(1)
2010	FC Volgar-Gazprom Astrakhan	27	(3)
2011	PFC Spartak Nalchik	4	(0)
2012	FC Chernomorets Novorossiysk	8	(0)
2013–2015	FC Spartak Gelendzhik		
2015–2016	FC Druzhba Maykop	19	(3)
2017–2018	FC Druzhba Maykop	32	(7)
2018	FC Angusht Nazran	4	(0)

International career
2007–2008	Russia U-21	5	(1)
- * Club domestic league appearances and goals

Nazir Yuryevich Kazharov (Russian: Назир Юрьевич Кажаров; born 12 January 1987) is a Russian former footballer.
