= Ghenadie Olexici =

Moldovan footballer

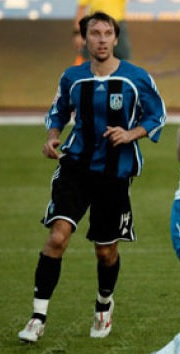
- Olexici with Shinnik Yaroslavl in 2008

Personal information
- Date of birth: 23 August 1978 (age 48)
- Place of birth: Chişinău, Moldavian SSR, Soviet Union
- Height: 1.83 m (6 ft 0 in)
- Position: Defender

Senior career*
Years	Team	Apps	(Gls)
1995–1997	MHM-93 Chișinău	4	(0)
1997–2004	Zimbru Chișinău	100	(6)
2004–2007	Amkar Perm	67	(2)
2008	Zimbru Chișinău	8	(1)
2008–2009	Shinnik Yaroslavl	38	(4)
2010–2011	Milsami Orhei	13	(3)

International career
2001–2007	Moldova	42	(0)
- * Club domestic league appearances and goals

Ghenadie Olexici (born 23 August 1978) is a Moldovan former footballer.

== Club career ==
Olexici signed a one-year contract with FC Alania Vladikavkaz in February 2008, but one month later he joined FC Zimbru Chişinău. He moved to Shinnik in July 2008.

== International career ==
Olexici has made 42 appearances for the senior Moldova national football team. He played 9 games in UEFA Euro 2008 qualifying.
