= Vitali Doroshenko =

Russian footballer and referee

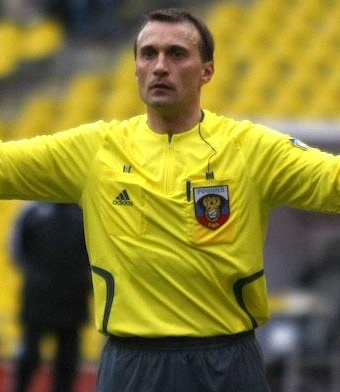

Personal information
- Full name: Vitali Viktorovich Doroshenko
- Date of birth: 4 May 1971 (age 55)
- Place of birth: Yeysk, Russian SFSR
- Height: 1.80 m (5 ft 11 in)
- Positions: Defender; forward

Senior career*
Years	Team	Apps	(Gls)
1990	FC Start Yeysk	22	(1)
1991–1992	FC Kuban Krasnodar	35	(0)
1992	FC Niva Slavyansk-na-Kubani	1	(0)
1993	FC Kuban Krasnodar	28	(0)
1994–1995	FC Olimpiya Komsomolets		
- * Club domestic league appearances and goals

Vitali Viktorovich Doroshenko (Russian: Виталий Викторович Дорошенко; born 4 May 1971 in Yeysk) is a former Russian football player and referee.

== Referee career ==
Assistant referee

- Russian Third League: 1996–1997
- Russian Second Division: 1997–2004
- Russian First Division: 1998–2005
- Russian Football Premier League: 2001–2005

Referee

- Russian Third League: 1997
- Russian Second Division: 1998–2009
- Russian First Division: 2001–2009
- Russian Football Premier League: 2007–2009

== Scandals ==
After the match “Spartak” - “Shinnik” (4:2), which took place as part of the 2008 Russian Football Championship, Doroshenko was accused of conspiracy against the Yaroslavl team and bribery from Spartak. It all started with a complaint from Shinnik representatives to the RFPL. The dissatisfaction of the Yaroslavl team was caused by the removal of Slavolub Djordjevic in the 45th minute and Dmitry Kudryashov in the 79th minute, as well as the assignment of a penalty after a duel between Djordjevic and the hosts' striker Nikita Bazhenov in the 13th minute. At a meeting of the RFU Expert Judicial Commission, complaints about refereeing were considered. This is how the head of the College of Football Referees, Sergei Zuev, commented on this: “We carefully reviewed all the episodes of the match in which, according to representatives of Shinnik, Doroshenko made mistakes. We agreed with a number of complaints from the Yaroslavl team: indeed, the second yellow card for Djordjevic, which led to his removal, was unfounded, since this moment was preceded by an unchecked offside for Welliton. Not everything is clear about the legality of awarding a penalty against Shinnik. At the same time, the claims of Shinnik representatives on five other points were recognized by the ESC as unfounded. In addition, we are absolutely sure that Doroshenko’s mistakes in this match were unbiased and were not caused by his low qualifications. I am confident in Vitaly’s qualifications and do not believe that he should be severely punished because of one unsuccessful match.” As a result, it was decided to remove Doroshenko from refereeing the next match between Terek and Amkar.

Another scandal occurred a year later, within the framework of the 2009 Russian Football Championship, after the match “Siberia” - “Anzhi” (1:2). The management of the Makhachkala club filed a complaint against chief referee Doroshenko on two counts. In the first episode, which led to a goal against Anzhi, Sibir striker Medvedev roughly attacked Anzhi defender Mamaev, after which he scored the ball. At another point, the referee did not award a penalty against Siberia for an obvious violation against Anzhi defender Mamaev. In addition, the Anzhi administration wrote a letter to the PFL, which states that “from the 20th minute until the end of the match, the Sibir players insulted the Anzhi players with obscene language.” According to Siberia General Director Lev Strelkov, the game and the events around it received a very big response.

For gross errors in several matches at once, Vitaly Doroshenko was suspended from refereeing Premier League matches until the end of the season.
