= FC Lukhovitsy =

Russian football club

- Full name: Football Club Lukhovitsy
- Founded: 1968
- League: Amateur Football League, Zone Moscow Oblast, Group B
- 2009: 2nd

FC Lukhovitsy (Russian: «Луховицы») is a Russian football team from Lukhovitsy. It played professionally in 1968–1969 and 1997–2008. Their best result was 3rd place in Zone Center of the Russian Second Division in 2007 and 2008. As of 2009, they play in the Amateur Football League, where they were relegated to because of financial difficulties.

== Team name history ==
- 1968–1991: FC Spartak Lukhovitsy
- 1992–1993: FC Sokol Lukhovitsy
- 1994–2006: FC Spartak Lukhovitsy
- 2007–present: FC Lukhovitsy
