= 2008 FC Luch-Energiya Vladivostok season =

Luch-Energiya Vladivostok
2008 season
- Manager: Zoran Vulić (until 10 October); Semen Altman (from 10 October)
- Stadium: Dynamo Stadium
- Premier League: 16th
- Russian Cup: Round of 32 vs Baltika Kaliningrad
- Top goalscorer: League: Vital Bulyga; Igor Shevchenko (5); All: Vital Bulyga; Igor Shevchenko (5)

The 2008 Luch-Energiya Vladivostok season was the club's 4th season in the Russian Premier League, and their third since 1993. Luch-Energiya Vladivostok finished the season in 16th, being relegated to the First Division for the 2009 season. In the 2008–09 Russian Cup, Luch-Energiya were knocked out at the Round of 32 by Baltika Kaliningrad.

== Season events ==
Prior to the start of the season, Zoran Vulić was appointed as the clubs new manager. After Vulić left his role as manager, Semen Altman was appointed as his replacement on 10 October.

In July, Luch-Energiya signed André Alves, Leandro, Josip Lukačević, Andrei Streltsov and Dragan Stojkić after all impressed on trial during Luch-Energiya's training camp in Austria.

On 28 August, goalkeeper Aleksey Polyakov joined Luch-Energiya on loan from Lokomotiv Moscow until the end of the season.

== Squad ==
As of match played 22 November 2008

No.	Name	Nationality	Position	Date of birth (age)	Signed from	Signed in	Contract ends	Apps.	Goals
Goalkeepers
16	Andrei Fisenko	(Russia)	GK	16 July 1987 (aged 21)	Youth Team	2007		0	0
35	Dragan Stojkić	(Bosnia and Herzegovina)	GK	7 October 1975 (aged 33)	Zagreb	2008		6	0
74	Aleksey Polyakov	(Uzbekistan)	GK	28 February 1974 (aged 34)	loan from Lokomotiv Moscow	2008	2008	6	0
90	Kirill Muzyka	(Russia)	GK	22 November 1990 (aged 18)	Youth Team	2007		2	0
91	Denis Kniga	(Russia)	GK	14 April 1992 (aged 16)	Youth Team	2008		0	0
Defenders
3	Dmitri N. Smirnov	(Russia)	DF	9 November 1980 (aged 28)	Khimki	2006		70	2
4	Rade Novković	(Serbia)	DF	25 June 1980 (aged 28)	Rad	2007		36	0
5	Igor Kralevski	(North Macedonia)	DF	10 November 1978 (aged 30)	Hajduk Split	2007		20	0
12	Danijel Vušković	(Croatia)	DF	5 January 1981 (aged 27)	Solin	2008		1	0
15	Nenad Begović	(Serbia)	DF	6 January 1980 (aged 28)	Kairat	2008		5	0
29	Sergei Chernogayev	(Russia)	DF	20 March 1983 (aged 25)	Torpedo Moscow	2008		15	0
31	Leandro	(Brazil)	DF	26 June 1985 (aged 23)	Kaposvári	2008		19	1
32	Kiril Pavlyuchek	(Belarus)	DF	27 June 1984 (aged 24)	Dinamo Minsk	2008		10	0
34	Matija Kristić	(Croatia)	DF	10 October 1978 (aged 30)	Slaven Belupo	2008		11	0
42	Sergei Semyonov	(Russia)	DF	27 June 1990 (aged 18)	Youth Team	2008		0	0
43	Aleksandr Dyulyukov	(Russia)	DF	30 October 1989 (aged 19)	Youth Team	2008		0	0
49	Roman Kishkaruk	(Russia)	DF	18 November 1989 (aged 19)	Youth Team	2007		1	0
50	Aleksei Kuznetsov	(Russia)	DF	24 June 1989 (aged 19)	Youth Team	2008		0	0
51	Yevgeniy Lieder	(Russia)	DF	28 April 1990 (aged 18)	Youth Team	2008		0	0
52	Artyom Yemelyanov	(Russia)	DF	25 December 1989 (aged 18)	Youth Team	2008		0	0
57	Maksim Nasadyuk	(Russia)	DF	11 February 1989 (aged 19)	Youth Team	2008		1	0
58	Sergei Legrov	(Russia)	DF	23 May 1990 (aged 18)	Youth Team	2008		0	0
61	Maksim Kulyomin	(Russia)	DF	25 May 1989 (aged 19)	Lokomotiv Moscow	2008		3	0
Midfielders
7	Yevgeni Kuznetsov	(Russia)	MF	2 December 1983 (aged 24)	Dynamo Moscow	2004			
11	Vladimir Vujović	(Montenegro)	MF	23 July 1982 (aged 26)	Mogren Budva	2008		17	0
14	Dario Damjanović	(Bosnia and Herzegovina)	MF	23 July 1981 (aged 27)	Hajduk Split	2008		25	1
18	Andrei Streltsov	(Russia)	MF	18 March 1984 (aged 24)	Anzhi Makhachkala	2008		15	0
22	Levan Gvazava	(Georgia (country))	MF	8 July 1980 (aged 28)	Spartak Nalchik	2007		36	4
24	Dmitry A. Smirnov	(Russia)	MF	13 August 1980 (aged 28)	Alania Vladikavkaz	2005			
26	Aleksandr Dantsev	(Russia)	MF	14 October 1984 (aged 24)	Khimki	2008		14	0
37	Josip Lukačević	(Bosnia and Herzegovina)	MF	3 November 1983 (aged 25)	Čelik Zenica	2008		6	0
41	Pavel Aliseyevich	(Russia)	MF	28 September 1989 (aged 19)	Youth Team	2008		0	0
45	Artyom Mikheyev	(Russia)	MF	28 October 1987 (aged 21)	Youth Team	2005			
47	Aleksandr Yashan	(Russia)	MF	22 April 1990 (aged 18)	Youth Team	2008		1	0
48	Dmitri Samoylov	(Russia)	MF	20 April 1990 (aged 18)	Youth Team	2008		1	0
53	Yuri Lebedev	(Russia)	MF	23 June 1989 (aged 19)	Youth Team	2008		1	0
55	Aleksei Ryakhin	(Russia)	MF	11 January 1989 (aged 19)	Youth Team	2008		0	0
59	Aleksandr Salimov	(Russia)	MF	22 April 1989 (aged 19)	Youth Team	2008		0	0
Forwards
8	Vital Bulyga	(Belarus)	FW	12 January 1980 (aged 28)	Tom Tomsk	2008		30	5
9	Vital Lanko	(Belarus)	FW	4 April 1977 (aged 31)	Spartak Nalchik	2007		22	0
25	Igor Shevchenko	(Russia)	FW	2 February 1985 (aged 23)	Krylia Sovetov	2008		25	5
30	André Alves	(Brazil)	FW	15 October 1983 (aged 25)	loan from Kaposvári	2008		13	1
33	Shamil Asildarov	(Russia)	FW	18 May 1983 (aged 25)	Anzhi Makhachkala	2008		10	1
44	Nikita Burmistrov	(Russia)	FW	6 July 1989 (aged 19)	loan from CSKA Moscow	2008		4	0
46	Aleksandr Kulik	(Russia)	FW	27 January 1990 (aged 18)	Youth Team	2008		0	0
54	Dmitriy Shugalei	(Russia)	FW	27 November 1990 (aged 17)	Youth Team	2008		0	0
56	Maksim Kazakov	(Russia)	FW	7 April 1987 (aged 21)	Youth Team	2007		0	0
60	Ilya Pakhmutov	(Russia)	FW	22 October 1989 (aged 19)	Youth Team	2008		0	0
64	Viktor Fomichyov	(Russia)	FW	4 January 1989 (aged 19)	Youth Team	2007		2	0
Away on loan
22	Stanislav Reznikov	(Russia)	MF	8 April 1986 (aged 22)	Chernomorets Novorossiysk	2005			
Players that left Luch-Energiya Vladivostok during the season
1	Aleksandr Chikhradze	(Russia)	GK	17 August 1975 (aged 33)	Spartak Nalchik	2007		5	0
2	Dacosta Goore	(Ivory Coast)	DF	21 December 1984 (aged 23)	ASEC Mimosas	2008		15	0
6	Marian Palát	(Czech Republic)	DF	1 June 1977 (aged 31)	Mladá Boleslav	2007		4	0
10	Aleksandr Tikhonovetsky	(Russia)	FW	11 April 1979 (aged 29)	Chernomorets Novorossiysk	2004			
13	Dmitri Kudinov	(Russia)	DF	25 August 1985 (aged 23)	Torpedo Moscow	2008		0	0
17	Aleksandr Sheshukov	(Russia)	MF	15 April 1983 (aged 25)	Spartak Moscow	2005			
19	Nenad Stojanović	(Serbia)	FW	22 October 1979 (aged 29)	Brussels	2007	2009	12	0
20	Roman Voydel	(Russia)	MF	16 July 1985 (aged 23)	Metallurg Lipetsk	2007		2	0
21	Roman Slavnov	(Russia)	MF	28 April 1982 (aged 26)	Shinnik Yaroslavl	2008		0	0
23	Marek Čech	(Czech Republic)	GK	8 April 1976 (aged 32)	Slovan Liberec	2007	2009	43	0
27	Georgi Bazayev	(Russia)	MF	26 August 1978 (aged 30)	Alania Vladikavkaz	2006		52	9

=== On loan ===
Note: Flags indicate national team as defined under FIFA eligibility rules; some limited exceptions apply. Players may hold more than one non-FIFA nationality.

No. / Pos. / Nation / Player; 22 / MF / RUS / Stanislav Reznikov (to Nosta Novotroitsk)	No. / Pos. / Nation / Player

=== Left club during season ===
Note: Flags indicate national team as defined under FIFA eligibility rules; some limited exceptions apply. Players may hold more than one non-FIFA nationality.

No.	Pos.	Nation	Player
1	GK	RUS	Aleksandr Chikhradze (to MVD Rossii Moscow)
2	DF	CIV	Dacosta Goore (to FC Moscow)
6	DF	CZE	Marian Palát (to Ružomberok)
10	FW	RUS	Aleksandr Tikhonovetsky (to Kuban Krasnodar)
13	DF	RUS	Dmitri Kudinov (to Salyut-Energiya Belgorod)
17	MF	RUS	Aleksandr Sheshukov (to FC Moscow)

No.	Pos.	Nation	Player
19	FW	SRB	Nenad Stojanović (to Vojvodina)
20	MF	RUS	Roman Voydel (to Baltika Kaliningrad)
21	MF	RUS	Roman Slavnov (to Salyut-Energiya Belgorod)
23	GK	CZE	Marek Čech (to Lokomotiv Moscow)
27	MF	RUS	Georgi Bazayev (to Alania Vladikavkaz)

== Transfers ==
=== In ===
Date	Position	Nationality	Name	From	Fee	Ref.
Winter 2008	DF	(Belarus)	Kiril Pavlyuchek	Dinamo Minsk	Undisclosed	
Winter 2008	DF	(Croatia)	Matija Kristić	Slaven Belupo	Undisclosed	
Winter 2008	DF	(Croatia)	Danijel Vušković	Solin	Undisclosed	
Winter 2008	DF	(Ivory Coast)	Dacosta Goore	ASEC Mimosas	Undisclosed	
Winter 2008	DF	(Russia)	Sergei Chernogayev	Torpedo Moscow	Undisclosed	
Winter 2008	DF	(Russia)	Dmitri Kudinov	Torpedo Moscow	Undisclosed	
Winter 2008	DF	(Russia)	Maksim Kulyomin	Lokomotiv Moscow	Undisclosed	
Winter 2008	DF	(Serbia)	Nenad Begović	Kairat	Undisclosed	
Winter 2008	MF	(Montenegro)	Vladimir Vujović	Mogren Budva	Undisclosed	
Winter 2008	MF	(Bosnia and Herzegovina)	Dario Damjanović	Hajduk Split	Undisclosed	
Winter 2008	MF	(Russia)	Roman Slavnov	Shinnik Yaroslavl	Undisclosed	
Winter 2008	FW	(Belarus)	Vital Bulyga	Tom Tomsk	Undisclosed	
Winter 2008	FW	(Russia)	Igor Shevchenko	Krylia Sovetov	Undisclosed	
Summer 2008	MF	(Russia)	Aleksandr Dantsev	Khimki	Undisclosed	
Summer 2008	FW	(Russia)	Shamil Asildarov	Anzhi Makhachkala	Undisclosed	
8 July 2008	GK	(Bosnia and Herzegovina)	Dragan Stojkić	Zagreb	Undisclosed	
8 July 2008	DF	(Brazil)	Leandro	Kaposvári	Undisclosed	
8 July 2008	MF	(Bosnia and Herzegovina)	Josip Lukačević	Čelik Zenica	Undisclosed	
8 July 2008	MF	(Russia)	Andrei Streltsov	Anzhi Makhachkala	Undisclosed	

=== Loans in ===
Date from	Position	Nationality	Name	To	Date to	Ref.
Winter 2008	FW	(Russia)	Nikita Burmistrov	CSKA Moscow	End of Season	
8 July 2008	FW	(Brazil)	André Alves	Kaposvári	End of Season	
28 August 2008	GK	(Uzbekistan)	Aleksey Polyakov	Lokomotiv Moscow	End of Season	

=== Out ===
Date	Position	Nationality	Name	To	Fee	Ref.
Summer 2008	GK	(Czech Republic)	Marek Čech	Lokomotiv Moscow	Undisclosed	
Summer 2008	GK	(Russia)	Aleksandr Chikhradze	MVD Rossii Moscow	Undisclosed	
Summer 2008	DF	(Czech Republic)	Marian Palát	Ružomberok	Undisclosed	
Summer 2008	DF	(Russia)	Dmitri Kudinov	Salyut-Energiya Belgorod	Undisclosed	
Summer 2008	MF	(Russia)	Aleksandr Sheshukov	FC Moscow	Undisclosed	
Summer 2008	MF	(Russia)	Roman Slavnov	Salyut-Energiya Belgorod	Undisclosed	
Summer 2008	FW	(Russia)	Aleksandr Tikhonovetsky	Kuban Krasnodar	Undisclosed	
Summer 2008	FW	(Serbia)	Nenad Stojanović	Vojvodina	Undisclosed	
3 September 2008	DF	(Ivory Coast)	Dacosta Goore	FC Moscow	Undisclosed	

=== Loans out ===
Date from	Position	Nationality	Name	To	Date to	Ref.
Winter 2007	MF	(Russia)	Stanislav Reznikov	Nosta Novotroitsk	End of Season	

=== Released ===
Date	Position	Nationality	Name	Joined	Date

== Competitions ==
=== Premier League ===
==== Results by round ====
Round	1	2	3	4	5	6	7	8	9	10	11	12	13	14	15	16	17	18	19	20	21	22	23	24	25	26	27	28	29	30
Ground	H	A	H	A	H	A	H	A	H	H	A	H	A	H	A	H	A	H	A	H	A	H	A	A	H	A	H	A	H	A
Result	D	L	W	L	D	L	L	D	L	D	D	D	L	W	L	D	W	D	L	D	L	L	D	L	D	L	L	L	D	L

Updated to match(es) played on 22 November 2008. Source: See Results
A = Away; H = Home; W = Win; D = Draw; L = Loss

==== Results ====
16 March 2008 1	Luch-Energiya Vladivostok	1 – 1	FC Moscow	Vladivostok
18:00 VLAT (UTC+10)	Vujović (yellow card) 10'; Gvazava 47'; Novković (yellow card) 66' (yellow-red card) 77'	Report	Bystrov (yellow card) 45'; Čížek (yellow card) 57'; Kuzmin 62'; Adamov (yellow card) 82'	Stadium: Dynamo Stadium; Attendance: 10,200; Referee: Nikolai Ivanov

23 March 2008 2	Rubin Kazan	1 – 0	Luch-Energiya Vladivostok	Kazan
15:30 MSK (UTC+3)	Sheshukov 17' (o.g.); Sibaya (yellow card) 35'; Kvirkvelia (yellow card) 52'; Orekhov (yellow card) 74' (yellow-red card) 88'; Ansaldi (yellow card) 77'; Ryzhikov (yellow card) 90'	Report	Vujović (yellow card) 39'; Gvazava (yellow card) 45'; Goore (yellow card) 61'; Damjanović (yellow card) 88'	Stadium: Central Stadium; Attendance: 15,000; Referee: Yuri Baskakov

29 March 2008 3	Luch-Energiya Vladivostok	1 – 0	Shinnik Yaroslavl	Vladivostok
19:00 VLAT (UTC+10)	D.N.Smirnov (yellow card) 10'; Shevchenko (yellow card) 33'; Tikhonovetsky 45+'	Report	Cherkes (yellow card) 4'; Monaryov (yellow card) 21'; Kudryashov (yellow card) 59'; Semochko (yellow card) 85'	Stadium: Dynamo Stadium; Attendance: 10,000; Referee: Aleksei Nikolaev

6 April 2008 4	Krylia Sovetov	2 – 1	Luch-Energiya Vladivostok	Samara
21:00 VLAT (UTC+10)	Tikhonov (yellow card) 28' (goal) 67'; Belozyorov 90'	Report	Chernogayev (yellow card) 46'; Sheshukov (yellow card) 66'; Shevchenko 81'; Gvazava (yellow card) 89'; Tikhonovetsky (yellow card) 90+'	Stadium: Metallurg Stadium; Attendance: 24,000; Referee: Sergei Karasev

13 April 2008 5	Luch-Energiya Vladivostok	0 – 0	Saturn Ramenskoye	Vladivostok
18:00 VLAT (UTC+10)		Report	Nakhushev (yellow card) 68'; Nemov (yellow card) 90+'	Stadium: Dynamo Stadium; Attendance: 10,000; Referee: Yuri Baskakov

21 April 2008 6	Terek Grozny	2 – 1	Luch-Energiya Vladivostok	Grozny
02:00 VLAT (UTC+10)	Serdyukov (red card) 11'; Kulik 3' (pen.); Kuzmichyov 45+1'; Lopes (yellow card) 58'	Report	Sheshukov (yellow card) 22'; Vujović (yellow card) 29'; Shevchenko (yellow card) 39' (goal) 90'; Čech (yellow card) 45+1'	Stadium: Sultan Bilimkhanov Stadium; Attendance: 9,500; Referee: Almir Kayumov

26 April 2008 7	Luch-Energiya Vladivostok	1 – 3	CSKA Moscow	Vladivostok
18:00 VLAT (UTC+10)	Vujović (yellow card) 8'; Bulyga 22'; Goore (yellow card) 26'; Bazayev (penalty missed) 29'	Report	Jô 24'; Vágner Love 43'; V.Berezutski (yellow card) 59'; Aldonin 89'	Stadium: Dynamo Stadium; Attendance: 8,500; Referee: Stanislav Sukhina

4 May 2008 8	Lokomotiv Moscow	2 – 2	Luch-Energiya Vladivostok	Moscow
02:00 VLAT (UTC+10)	Spahić (yellow card) 8'; Bilyaletdinov 20', 55' (pen.); Gurenko (yellow card) 51'; Asatiani (yellow card) 63'; Samedov (yellow card) 68'	Report	Damjanović (yellow card) 6'; Lanko (yellow card) 54'; Čech (yellow card) 55'; Kuznetsov (yellow card) 66'; Bazayev 80'; Tikhonovetsky 81' (pen.); Goore (yellow card) 85'	Stadium: Lokomotiv Stadium; Attendance: 12,822; Referee: Vladislav Bezborodov

7 May 2008 9	Luch-Energiya Vladivostok	0 – 2	Spartak Nalchik	Vladivostok
19:00 VLAT (UTC+10)	Damjanović (yellow card) 10'; Tikhonovetsky (yellow card) 74'; D.N.Smirnov (yellow card) 86'; Novković (yellow card) 90'	Report	Mashukov (yellow card) 48'; Baiano 58'; Gogua (yellow card) 85'; Kochubei 90+'	Stadium: Dynamo Stadium; Attendance: 8,500; Referee: Maksim Layushkin

11 May 2008 10	Luch-Energiya Vladivostok	0 – 0	Zenit St.Petersburg	Vladivostok
VLAT (UTC+10)		Report		Stadium: Dynamo Stadium; Attendance: 6,500; Referee: Vitali Doroshenko

15 May 2008 11	Tom Tomsk	1 – 1	Luch-Energiya Vladivostok	Tomsk
23:00 VLAT (UTC+10)	Strelkov 32'; Stroyev (yellow card) 34'	Report	Vujović (yellow card) 6'; Tikhonovetsky 8' (yellow card) 23'; D.N.Smirnov (yellow card) 79'	Stadium: Trud Stadium; Attendance: 10,000; Referee: Yuri Baskakov

5 July 2008 12	Luch-Energiya Vladivostok	1 – 1	Khimki	Vladivostok
19:00 VLAT (UTC+10)	Damjanović (yellow card) 39'; Bulyga 54'; Gvazava (yellow card) 81'; Kralevski (yellow card) 83'	Report	Jovanović (yellow card) 2'; Stepanov (yellow card) 21'; Antipenko (yellow card) 63'; Pershin (yellow card) 80'; Nizamutdinov 82' (yellow card) 89'	Stadium: Dynamo Stadium; Attendance: 8,500; Referee: Vladimir Pettay

12 July 2008 13	Amkar Perm	2 – 0	Luch-Energiya Vladivostok	Perm
23:00 VLAT (UTC+10)	Kushev 25'; Dujmović 48'; Gaál (yellow card) 60'; Peev (yellow card) 90'	Report		Stadium: Zvezda Stadium; Attendance: 14,500; Referee: Vyacheslav Kharlamov

20 July 2008 14	Luch-Energiya Vladivostok	1 – 0	Dynamo Moscow	Vladivostok
19:00 VLAT (UTC+10)	Novković (yellow card) 78'; D.N.Smirnov (yellow card) 89'; Shevchenko 90'	Report	Kowalczyk (yellow card) 12'; Fernández (yellow card) 69'; Smolov (yellow card) 70'	Stadium: Dynamo Stadium; Attendance: 7,500; Referee: Yuri Klyuchnikov

28 July 2008 15	Spartak Moscow	3 – 0	Luch-Energiya Vladivostok	Moscow
01:00 VLAT (UTC+10)	Kováč 39'; Pavlyuchenko (penalty missed) 55'; Prudnikov 66'; Mozart 89' (pen.)	Report	Lukačević (yellow card) 33'; Streltsov (yellow card) 65'; Vujović (yellow card) 74'; Čech (red card) 87'	Stadium: Luzhniki Stadium; Attendance: 14,500; Referee: Vladislav Bezborodov

3 August 2008 16	Luch-Energiya Vladivostok	1 – 1	Rubin Kazan	Vladivostok
12:00 MSK (UTC+3)	Alves 22'; Gvazava (yellow card) 23'; Streltsov (yellow card) 35'	Report	Semak (yellow card) 75'; Karadeniz 86'	Stadium: Dynamo Stadium; Attendance: 9,000; Referee: Aleksandr Gvardis

10 August 2008 17	Shinnik Yaroslavl	1 – 2	Luch-Energiya Vladivostok	Yaroslavl
00:30 VLAT (UTC+10)	Semochko (yellow card) 6'; Lazarov (yellow card) 38'; Khazov (yellow card) 40'; Boyarintsev 42'; Vještica (yellow card) 49' (yellow-red card) 60'	Report	Bulyga (penalty missed) 27'; Lukačević (yellow card) 44'; D.N.Smirnov 50'; Shevchenko (yellow card) 52'; D.A.Smirnov 77'	Stadium: Shinnik Stadium; Attendance: 5,000; Referee: Yuri Baskakov

16 August 2008 18	Luch-Energiya Vladivostok	0 – 0	Krylia Sovetov	Vladivostok
19:00 VLAT (UTC+10)	Damjanović (yellow card) 63'	Report	Bobyor (yellow card) 25'; Oh (yellow card) 29'; R.Ajinjal (yellow card) 39'; Savin (yellow card) 75'; Ivanov (yellow card) 90+'	Stadium: Dynamo Stadium; Attendance: 8,000; Referee: Vladislav Bezborodov

25 August 2008 19	Saturn Ramenskoye	2 – 1	Luch-Energiya Vladivostok	Ramenskoye
00:30 VLAT (UTC+10)	Vorobyov (yellow card) 21'; Topić 26', 36'; Zelão (yellow card) 31'; Ivanov (yellow card) 75'	Report	Leandro (yellow card) 20'; Alves (yellow card) 31'; Kristić (yellow card) 35'; Damjanović (yellow card) 59'; Bulyga 66'; Dantsev (yellow card) 78'	Stadium: Saturn Stadium; Attendance: 7,000; Referee: Igor Egorov

31 August 2008 20	Luch-Energiya Vladivostok	1 – 1	Terek Grozny	Vladivostok
19:00 VLAT (UTC+10)	Bulyga (yellow card) 45'; D.A.Smirnov 50'; Novković (yellow card) 83'	Report	Dzhabrailov (yellow card) 35' (goal) 77'; Kuzmichyov (yellow card) 55'; Petre 83'	Stadium: Dynamo Stadium; Attendance: 8,000; Referee: Aleksei Nikolaev

15 September 2008 21	CSKA Moscow	4 – 1	Luch-Energiya Vladivostok	Moscow
03:00 VLAT (UTC+10)	Šemberas (yellow card) 10'; Dzagoev 37'; Vágner Love 57'; Krasić 78', 90+1'; Mamayev (yellow card) 88'	Report	Vujović (yellow card) 4'; Kristić (yellow card) 23'; Shevchenko 68'	Stadium: Luzhniki Stadium; Attendance: 9,000; Referee: Vitali Doroshenko

20 September 2008 22	Luch-Energiya Vladivostok	2 – 3	Lokomotiv Moscow	Vladivostok
19:00 VLAT (UTC+10)	Asildarov 6' (pen.); Gvazava 60'; Novković (yellow card) 90+'	Report	Gurenko (yellow card) 6'; Yanbayev (yellow card) 6'; Sychev 32' (yellow card) 37'; Odemwingie 61'; Sennikov 63'	Stadium: Dynamo Stadium; Attendance: 8,500; Referee: Aleksandr Gvardis

28 September 2008 23	Spartak Nalchik	2 – 2	Luch-Energiya Vladivostok	Nalchik
00:15 VLAT (UTC+10)	Kisenkov 59' (yellow card) 90+'; Kalimullin 78'	Report	Shevchenko 70'; D.N.Smirnov (yellow card) 80'; Pavlyuchek (yellow card) 82'; Damjanović 88'; Dantsev (yellow card) 90+'	Stadium: Spartak Stadium; Attendance: 8,000; Referee: Yuri Baskakov

6 October 2008 24	Zenit St.Petersburg	8 – 1	Luch-Energiya Vladivostok	Saint Petersburg
01:00 VLAT (UTC+10)	Danny 7', 42' (yellow card) 41'; Puygrenier (yellow card) 16'; Arshavin 20'; Tekke (yellow card) 28' (goal) 47', 60', 89'; Shirokov 35'; Domínguez 72'	Report	Bulyga 74'; Dantsev (yellow card) 90+'	Stadium: Petrovsky Stadium; Attendance: 20,000; Referee: Igor Zakharov

18 October 2008 25	Luch-Energiya Vladivostok	0 – 0	Tom Tomsk	Vladivostok
19:00 VLAT (UTC+10)	Pavlyuchek (yellow card) 32'; Shevchenko (yellow card) 41'; D.N.Smirnov (yellow card) 81'	Report	Jokić (yellow card) 17'; Stoica (yellow card) 24'; Yanotovsky (yellow card) 56'; Mandrykin (yellow card) 90+'	Stadium: Dynamo Stadium; Attendance: 8,500; Referee: Nikolai Ivanov

25 October 2008 26	Khimki	3 – 1	Luch-Energiya Vladivostok	Khimki
21:00 VLAT (UTC+10)	Kudryashov (yellow card) 40'; Titov 56'; Antipenko 68'; Trivunović 76'; Jakubko (yellow card) 90'	Report	Leandro 30'; Gvazava (yellow card) 35'; Pavlyuchek (yellow card) 39'; Damjanović (yellow card) 45'; D.A.Smirnov (yellow card) 53'; Bulyga (yellow card) 67'	Stadium: Rodina Stadium; Attendance: 13,000; Referee: Aleksandr Gvardis

2 November 2008 27	Luch-Energiya Vladivostok	0 – 1	Amkar Perm	Vladivostok
19:00 VLAT (UTC+10)	Dantsev (yellow card) 12'; D.N.Smirnov (yellow card) 52' (yellow-red card) 72'; Shevchenko (yellow card) 81'	Report	Kalashnikov (yellow card) 18'; Starkov 19'; Zhilyayev (yellow card) 60'; Kushev (yellow card) 81'	Stadium: Dynamo Stadium; Attendance: 7,000; Referee: Vladimir Pettay

9 November 2008 28	Dynamo Moscow	2 – 0	Luch-Energiya Vladivostok	Moscow
23:30 VLAT (UTC+10)	Genkov (yellow card) 28'; Khokhlov 29'; Kerzhakov (yellow card) 65'; D.Kombarov (yellow card) 77'; Kokorin (yellow card) 80'; Dimidko 82'	Report	Pavlyuchek (yellow card) 47'; Damjanović (yellow card) 64'; Leandro (yellow card) 65'; Polyakov (yellow card) 83'	Stadium: Dynamo Stadium; Attendance: 8,000; Referee: Igor Egorov

16 November 2008 29	Luch-Energiya Vladivostok	2 – 2	Spartak Moscow	Vladivostok
21:00 VLAT (UTC+10)	Kulyomin (yellow card) 56'; Gvazava 67'; Bulyga 83'	Report	Pavlenko 4'; Maidana 89'	Stadium: Dynamo Stadium; Attendance: 7,500; Referee: Vitali Doroshenko

22 November 2008 30	FC Moscow	3 – 0	Luch-Energiya Vladivostok	Moscow
21:00 VLAT (UTC+10)	Ivanov (yellow card) 62'; López 78' (pen.); Vukić 87'; Stavpets 90'	Report	Kristić (yellow card) 41'; D.N.Smirnov (yellow card) 78'	Stadium: Eduard Streltsov Stadium; Attendance: 1,500; Referee: Nikolai Ivanov

==== League table ====
Pos	Team	Pld	W	D	L	GF	GA	GD	Pts	Qualification or relegation
12	Spartak Nalchik	30	8	8	14	30	39	−9	32	
13	Tom Tomsk	30	7	8	15	23	39	−16	29	
14	Khimki	30	6	9	15	34	54	−20	27	
15	Shinnik Yaroslavl (R)	30	5	7	18	25	48	−23	22	Relegation to First Division
16	Luch-Energiya Vladivostok (R)	30	3	12	15	24	53	−29	21	Relegation to First Division

Source: RFPL (in Russian)
Rules for classification: 1st points; 2nd matches won; 3rd head-to-head (points, matches won, goal difference, goals scored, away goals scored); 4th goal difference; 5th goals scored; 6th away goals scored; 7th position in previous season or decision game
(R) Relegated

=== Russian Cup ===
==== 2008-09 ====
7 August 2008 Round of 32	Baltika Kaliningrad	3 – 0	Luch-Energiya Vladivostok	Kaliningrad
02:30 VLAT (UTC+10)	Zebelyan 4', 9', 25' (yellow card) 21'	Report	Vujović (yellow card) 32'; Lanko (yellow card) 68'; Kulyomin (yellow card) 90+'	Stadium: Baltika Stadium; Attendance: 8,200; Referee: Almir Kayumov

== Squad statistics ==
As of match played 22 November 2008

=== Appearances and goals ===
No.	Pos	Nat	Player	Total		Premier League		2008-9 Russian Cup	
No.	Pos	Nat	Player	Apps	Goals	Apps	Goals	Apps	Goals
3	DF	(Russia) RUS	Dmitri N. Smirnov	26	1	26	1	0	0
4	DF	(Serbia) SRB	Rade Novković	22	0	21+1	0	0	0
5	DF	(North Macedonia) MKD	Igor Kralevski	2	0	0+2	0	0	0
7	MF	(Russia) RUS	Yevgeni Kuznetsov	10	0	2+8	0	0	0
8	FW	(Belarus) BLR	Vital Bulyga	30	5	29+1	5	0	0
9	FW	(Belarus) BLR	Vital Lanko	11	0	1+9	0	1	0
11	MF	(Montenegro) MNE	Vladimir Vujović	17	0	13+3	0	1	0
12	DF	(Croatia) CRO	Danijel Vušković	1	0	0+1	0	0	0
15	DF	(Serbia) SRB	Nenad Begović	5	0	1+3	0	1	0
14	MF	(Bosnia and Herzegovina) BIH	Dario Damjanović	25	1	24+1	1	0	0
18	MF	(Russia) RUS	Andrei Streltsov	15	0	11+4	0	0	0
22	MF	(Georgia (country)) GEO	Levan Gvazava	27	3	27	3	0	0
24	MF	(Russia) RUS	Dmitry A. Smirnov	14	2	12+2	2	0	0
25	FW	(Russia) RUS	Igor Shevchenko	25	5	16+9	5	0	0
26	MF	(Russia) RUS	Aleksandr Dantsev	14	0	14	0	0	0
29	DF	(Russia) RUS	Sergei Chernogayev	15	0	8+7	0	0	0
30	FW	(Brazil) BRA	André Alves	13	1	8+5	1	0	0
31	DF	(Brazil) BRA	Leandro	19	1	19	1	0	0
32	DF	(Belarus) BLR	Kiril Pavlyuchek	10	0	9+1	0	0	0
33	FW	(Russia) RUS	Shamil Asildarov	10	1	3+6	1	1	0
34	DF	(Croatia) CRO	Matija Kristić	11	0	10+1	0	0	0
35	GK	(Croatia) CRO	Dragan Stojkić	6	0	6	0	0	0
37	MF	(Bosnia and Herzegovina) BIH	Josip Lukačević	6	0	2+4	0	0	0
44	FW	(Russia) RUS	Nikita Burmistrov	4	0	2+2	0	0	0
45	MF	(Russia) RUS	Artyom Mikheyev	5	0	3+1	0	1	0
47	MF	(Russia) RUS	Aleksandr Yashan	1	0	0	0	1	0
48	MF	(Russia) RUS	Dmitri Samoylov	1	0	0	0	1	0
49	DF	(Russia) RUS	Roman Kishkaruk	1	0	0	0	1	0
53	MF	(Russia) RUS	Yuri Lebedev	1	0	0	0	1	0
57	DF	(Russia) RUS	Maksim Nasadyuk	1	0	0	0	1	0
61	DF	(Russia) RUS	Maksim Kulyomin	3	0	1+1	0	0+1	0
64	FW	(Russia) RUS	Viktor Fomichyov	1	0	0	0	0+1	0
74	GK	(Uzbekistan) UZB	Aleksey Polyakov	6	0	6	0	0	0
90	GK	(Russia) RUS	Kirill Muzyka	1	0	0	0	1	0
Players away from the club on loan:
Players who appeared for Luch-Energiya Vladivostok but left during the season:
2	DF	(Ivory Coast) CIV	Dacosta Goore	15	0	15	0	0	0
10	FW	(Russia) RUS	Aleksandr Tikhonovetsky	10	3	7+3	3	0	0
17	MF	(Russia) RUS	Aleksandr Sheshukov	10	0	10	0	0	0
23	GK	(Czech Republic) CZE	Marek Čech	18	0	18	0	0	0
27	MF	(Russia) RUS	Georgi Bazayev	6	1	4+2	1	0	0

=== Goal scorers ===
Place	Position	Nation	Number	Name	Premier League	2008-09 Russian Cup	Total
1	FW	(Russia)	25	Igor Shevchenko	5	0	5
1	FW	(Belarus)	8	Vital Bulyga	5	0	5
3	FW	(Russia)	10	Aleksandr Tikhonovetsky	3	0	3
3	MF	(Georgia (country))	22	Levan Gvazava	3	0	3
5	MF	(Russia)	24	Dmitri A. Smirnov	2	0	2
6	MF	(Russia)	27	Georgi Bazayev	1	0	1
6	FW	(Brazil)	30	André Alves	1	0	1
6	DF	(Russia)	3	Dmitri N. Smirnov	1	0	1
6	FW	(Russia)	33	Shamil Asildarov	1	0	1
6	MF	(Bosnia and Herzegovina)	14	Dario Damjanović	1	0	1
6	DF	(Brazil)	31	Leandro	1	0	1
Total					24	0	24

=== Clean sheets ===
Place	Position	Nation	Number	Name	Premier League	2008-09 Russian Cup	Total
1	GK	(Czech Republic)	23	Marek Čech	5	0	5
2	GK	(Uzbekistan)	74	Aleksey Polyakov	1	0	1
TOTALS					6	0	6

=== Disciplinary record ===
Number	Nation	Position	Name	Premier League		2008-09 Russian Cup		Total	
Number	Nation	Position	Name	Booked	Sent off (straight red)	Booked	Sent off (straight red)	Booked	Sent off (straight red)
3	(Russia)	DF	Dmitri N. Smirnov	9	1	0	0	9	1
4	(Serbia)	DF	Rade Novković	6	1	0	0	6	1
5	(North Macedonia)	DF	Igor Kralevski	1	0	0	0	1	0
7	(Russia)	MF	Yevgeni Kuznetsov	1	0	0	0	1	0
8	(Belarus)	FW	Vital Bulyga	3	0	0	0	3	0
9	(Belarus)	FW	Vital Lanko	1	0	1	0	2	0
11	(Montenegro)	MF	Vladimir Vujović	7	0	1	0	8	0
14	(Bosnia and Herzegovina)	MF	Dario Damjanović	8	0	0	0	8	0
18	(Russia)	MF	Andrei Streltsov	2	0	0	0	2	0
22	(Georgia (country))	MF	Levan Gvazava	6	0	0	0	6	0
24	(Russia)	MF	Dmitry Smirnov	1	0	0	0	1	0
25	(Russia)	FW	Igor Shevchenko	5	0	0	0	5	0
26	(Russia)	MF	Aleksandr Dantsev	4	0	0	0	4	0
29	(Russia)	DF	Sergei Chernogayev	1	0	0	0	1	0
30	(Brazil)	FW	André Alves	1	0	0	0	1	0
31	(Brazil)	DF	Leandro	2	0	0	0	2	0
32	(Belarus)	DF	Kiril Pavlyuchek	4	0	0	0	4	0
34	(Croatia)	DF	Matija Kristić	3	0	0	0	3	0
37	(Bosnia and Herzegovina)	MF	Josip Lukačević	2	0	0	0	2	0
61	(Russia)	DF	Maksim Kulyomin	1	0	1	0	2	0
74	(Uzbekistan)	GK	Aleksey Polyakov	1	0	0	0	1	0
Players away on loan:
Players who left Luch-Energiya Vladivostok during the season:
2	(Ivory Coast)	DF	Dacosta Goore	3	0	0	0	3	0
10	(Russia)	FW	Aleksandr Tikhonovetsky	3	0	0	0	3	0
17	(Russia)	MF	Aleksandr Sheshukov	2	0	0	0	2	0
23	(Czech Republic)	GK	Marek Čech	2	1	0	0	2	1
Total				79	3	3	0	82	3
