= Yevgeni Kuznetsov =

Yevgeni Kuznetsov may refer to:

- Yevgeni Kuznetsov (footballer, born 1961), Soviet Olympic champion footballer
- Yevgeni Kuznetsov (footballer, born 1983), Russian footballer
- Yevgeni Kuznetsov (footballer, born 2000), Russian footballer
- Evgeny Kuznetsov (born 1992), Russian ice hockey player
- Yevgeni Kuznetsov (mechanic), Russian pioneer of polar aviation
- Yevgeni Kuznetsov (actor) (1916-1973), Soviet actor
- Yevgeny Kuznetsov (politician) (1938–2005), Russian politician, former head of Stavropol Krai
- Yevgeniy Kuznetsov, Kazakhstani bowler who participated in the 2006 Asian Games
- Evgeny Kuznetsov (diver) (born 1990), Russian diver
