= 2008 Russian Premier League =

17th season of top-tier football league in Russia

Russian Premier League
- Season: 2008
- Champions: Rubin Kazan; 1st title
- Relegated: Shinnik Yaroslavl; Luch-Energiya Vladivostok
- Champions League: Rubin Kazan; CSKA Moscow; Dynamo Moscow
- Europa League: Amkar Perm; Zenit St.Petersburg; Krylia Sovetov
- Matches: 240
- Goals: 578 (2.41 per match)
- Top goalscorer: Vágner Love (20)

The 2008 Russian Premier League was the 17th edition of the Russian Football Championship, and the seventh under the current Russian Premier League name. The season started on Friday, 14 March 2008 with a match between Terek and Krylia Sovetov in Grozny. Krylia Sovetov won 3–0. The first goal of the season was scored by Krylia Sovetov's forward Yevgeny Savin.

Due to Russia's participation in UEFA Euro 2008, the season was interrupted from 16 May until 5 July.

The champions were determined on the 27th matchday, 2 November 2008. Rubin claimed their first championship title in Russian Premier League, defeating Saturn 2–1 away, with Savo Milošević scoring in the 89th minute to claim the title for his club. Rubin became the third (and second consecutive) non-Moscow club to become Russian champions.

The last round of matches was played on 22 November 2008.

== Teams ==
As in the previous season, 16 teams played in the 2008 season. After the 2007 season, Kuban Krasnodar and Rostov were relegated to the 2008 Russian First Division. They were replaced by Shinnik Yaroslavl and Terek Grozny, the winners and runners up of the 2007 Russian First Division.

=== Venues ===
Amkar	CSKA	Dynamo	Khimki
Zvezda Stadium	Luzhniki Stadium	Central Stadium	Arena Khimki
Capacity: 20,000	Capacity: 76,000	Capacity: 36,540	Capacity: 18,000
Krylia	Locations of teams in 2008 Russian Premier League Locations of teams in 2008 Russian Premier League, Tomsk & Vladivostok		Lokomotiv
Metallurg Stadium	Locations of teams in 2008 Russian Premier League Locations of teams in 2008 Russian Premier League, Tomsk & Vladivostok		RZD Arena
Capacity: 33,220	Locations of teams in 2008 Russian Premier League Locations of teams in 2008 Russian Premier League, Tomsk & Vladivostok		Capacity: 28,800
Luch-Energia	Locations of teams in 2008 Russian Premier League Locations of teams in 2008 Russian Premier League, Tomsk & Vladivostok		Moscow
Dynamo Stadium	Locations of teams in 2008 Russian Premier League Locations of teams in 2008 Russian Premier League, Tomsk & Vladivostok		Eduard Streltsov Stadium
Capacity: 10,200	Locations of teams in 2008 Russian Premier League Locations of teams in 2008 Russian Premier League, Tomsk & Vladivostok		Capacity: 13,422
Rubin	Locations of teams in 2008 Russian Premier League Locations of teams in 2008 Russian Premier League, Tomsk & Vladivostok		Saturn
Central Stadium	Locations of teams in 2008 Russian Premier League Locations of teams in 2008 Russian Premier League, Tomsk & Vladivostok		Saturn Stadium
Capacity: 30,133	Locations of teams in 2008 Russian Premier League Locations of teams in 2008 Russian Premier League, Tomsk & Vladivostok		Capacity: 16,726
Shinnik	Locations of teams in 2008 Russian Premier League Locations of teams in 2008 Russian Premier League, Tomsk & Vladivostok		Spartak Moscow
Shinnik Stadium	Locations of teams in 2008 Russian Premier League Locations of teams in 2008 Russian Premier League, Tomsk & Vladivostok		Luzhniki Stadium
Capacity: 19,000	Locations of teams in 2008 Russian Premier League Locations of teams in 2008 Russian Premier League, Tomsk & Vladivostok		Capacity: 76,000
Spartak Nalchik	Terek	Tom	Zenit Saint Petersburg
Spartak Stadium	Sultan Bilimkhanov Stadium	Trud Stadium	Petrovsky Stadium
Capacity: 14,400	Capacity: 10,400	Capacity: 14,950	Capacity: 21,725

=== Personnel and kits ===
Team	Location	Head coach	Captain	Kit manufacturer	Shirt sponsor
Amkar Perm	Perm	(Montenegro) Miodrag Božović	(Russia) Aleksei Popov	Adidas	
CSKA	Moscow	(Russia) Valery Gazzaev	(Russia) Igor Akinfeev	Reebok	VTB
Dynamo	Moscow	(Russia) Andrey Kobelev	(Russia) Dmitri Khokhlov	Umbro	Metalloinvest
Khimki	Khimki	(Russia) Sergei Yuran	(Armenia) Roman Berezovsky	Nike	Mezhregionalnaya Developerskaya Kompania
Krylia	Samara	(Russia) Leonid Slutsky	(South Africa) Matthew Booth	Umbro	RosTekhnologii
Lokomotiv	Moscow	(Tajikistan) Rashid Rakhimov	(Russia) Diniyar Bilyaletdinov	Adidas	Russian Railways
Luch-Energia	Vladivostok	(Ukraine) Semen Altman	(Russia) Dmitry Smirnov	Nike	DalEnergo
Moscow	Moscow	(Ukraine) Oleg Blokhin	(Russia) Dmitri Godunok	Umbro	Norilsk Nickel
Rubin	Kazan	(Turkmenistan) Kurban Berdyev	(Russia) Sergei Semak	Nike	ТАИФ
Saturn	Ramenskoye	(Germany) Jürgen Röber	(Russia) Aleksei Igonin	Adidas	
Shinnik	Yaroslavl	(Russia) Sergei Pavlov	(Russia) Denis Boyarintsev	Adidas	
Spartak	Moscow	(Denmark) Michael Laudrup	(Brazil) Mozart	Nike	Lukoil
Spartak	Nalchik	(Russia) Yuri Krasnozhan	(Montenegro) Miodrag Džudović	Nike	
Terek	Grozny	(Ukraine) Vyacheslav Hroznyi	(Russia) Timur Dzhabrailov	Umbro	RAO UES
Tom	Tomsk	(Russia) Valery Nepomnyashchy	(Russia) Valeri Klimov	Adidas	
Zenit	Saint Petersburg	(Netherlands) Dick Advocaat	(Ukraine) Anatoliy Tymoshchuk	Puma	Gazprom

=== Managerial changes ===
Team	Outgoing manager	Manner of departure	Date of vacancy	Position in table	Replaced by	Date of appointment	Position in table
Moscow	(Russia) Leonid Slutsky	Fired	End of 2007 Season	Preseason	(Ukraine) Oleg Blokhin	14 December 2007	Preseason
Amkar	(Tajikistan) Rashid Rakhimov	Joined Lokomotiv	6 December 2007	Preseason	(Montenegro) Miodrag Božović	9 January 2008	Preseason
Krylia	(Russia) Aleksandr Tarkhanov			Preseason	(Russia) Leonid Slutsky	21 December 2007	Preseason
Lokomotiv	(Russia) Anatoliy Byshovets			Preseason	(Tajikistan) Rashid Rakhimov	6 December 2007	Preseason
Luch-Energiya	(Russia) Sergei Pavlov			Preseason	(Croatia) Zoran Vulić	19 December 2007	Preseason
Khimki	(Serbia) Slavoljub Muslin	Fired	14 April 2008	14th	(Russia) Igor Yushchenko (Caretaker)	14 April 2008	14th
Khimki	(Russia) Igor Yushchenko (Caretaker)	End of role	29 May 2008	16th	(Russia) Sergei Yuran	29 May 2008	16th
Tom	(Russia) Valery Petrakov	Mutual termination	1 June 2008	12th	(Belarus) Miroslav Romaschenko	1 June 2008	12th
Saturn	(Russia) Gadzhi Gadzhiyev		8 August 2008	12th	(Germany) Jürgen Röber	21 August 2008	12th
Spartak	(Russia) Stanislav Cherchesov	Fired	14 August 2008	4th	(Russia) Igor Lediakhov (Caretaker)	14 August 2008	4th
Tom	(Belarus) Miroslav Romaschenko	Fired	4 September 2008	12th	(Russia) Vasili Baskakov (Caretaker)	4 September 2008	12th
Tom	(Russia) Vasili Baskakov (Caretaker)	End of role	11 September 2008	12th	(Russia) Valery Nepomnyashchy	11 September 2008	12th
Spartak	(Russia) Igor Lediakhov (Caretaker)	End of role	12 September 2008	3rd	(Denmark) Michael Laudrup	12 September 2008	3rd
Luch-Energiya	(Croatia) Zoran Vulić	10 October 2008		14th	(Ukraine) Semen Altman	10 October 2008	14th

== League table ==
Pos	Team	Pld	W	D	L	GF	GA	GD	Pts	Qualification or relegation
1	Rubin Kazan (C)	30	18	6	6	44	26	+18	60	Qualification to Champions League group stage
2	CSKA Moscow	30	16	8	6	53	24	+29	56	Qualification to Champions League group stage
3	Dynamo Moscow	30	15	9	6	41	29	+12	54	Qualification to Champions League third qualifying round
4	Amkar Perm	30	14	9	7	31	22	+9	51	Qualification to Europa League play-off round
5	Zenit St. Petersburg	30	12	12	6	59	37	+22	48 (Note: Zenit St. Petersburg ahead of Krylia Sovetov on head-to-head points; Zenit St. Petersburg–Krylia Sovetov 1–1, Krylia Sovetov–Zenit St. Petersburg 0–3.)	Qualification to Europa League play-off round
6	Krylia Sovetov Samara	30	12	12	6	46	28	+18	48	Qualification to Europa League third qualifying round (Note: Since both finalists of the 2008–09 Russian Cup qualified for the 2009–10 UEFA Champions League, Krylia Sovetov earned a spot in the third qualifying round of the 2009–10 UEFA Europa League.)
7	Lokomotiv Moscow	30	13	8	9	37	32	+5	47	
8	Spartak Moscow	30	11	11	8	43	39	+4	44	
9	FC Moscow	30	9	11	10	34	36	−2	38	
10	Terek Grozny	30	9	8	13	28	42	−14	35	
11	Saturn	30	7	12	11	26	30	−4	33	
12	Spartak Nalchik	30	8	8	14	30	39	−9	32	
13	Tom Tomsk	30	7	8	15	23	39	−16	29	
14	Khimki	30	6	9	15	34	54	−20	27	
15	Shinnik Yaroslavl (R)	30	5	7	18	25	48	−23	22	Relegation to First Division
16	Luch-Energiya Vladivostok (R)	30	3	12	15	24	53	−29	21	Relegation to First Division

Source: RFPL (in Russian)
Rules for classification: 1st points; 2nd matches won; 3rd head-to-head (points, matches won, goal difference, goals scored, away goals scored); 4th goal difference; 5th goals scored; 6th away goals scored; 7th position in previous season or decision game
(C) Champions; (R) Relegated

== Results ==
Home \ Away	AMK	CSK	DYN	KHI	KRY	LOK	LUE	MOS	RUB	SAT	SHI	SPA	SPN	TER	TOM	ZEN
Amkar Perm		3–3	1–2	3–1	1–0	0–0	2–0	2–0	1–2	1–0	2–0	1–1	0–0	0–0	0–0	1–1
CSKA Moscow	4–1		0–2	4–3	0–0	0–0	4–1	0–2	4–0	1–0	1–1	0–1	0–1	2–0	2–1	0–0
Dynamo Moscow	1–0	1–3		2–0	2–2	4–2	2–0	1–1	0–2	2–1	2–0	4–3	1–0	2–1	2–0	1–0
Khimki	0–3	1–2	1–1		1–0	2–2	3–1	0–2	0–4	2–1	0–0	3–3	2–0	0–1	1–1	1–4
Krylia Sovetov Samara	2–0	0–2	3–3	3–0		2–0	2–1	1–1	2–2	4–0	4–0	1–1	2–0	4–3	3–0	0–3
Lokomotiv Moscow	0–1	0–2	0–1	0–2	2–0		2–2	3–2	0–1	0–0	3–0	2–2	0–0	2–0	2–0	0–3
Luch-Energiya Vladivostok	0–1	1–3	1–0	1–1	0–0	2–3		1–1	1–1	0–0	1–0	2–2	0–2	1–1	0–0	0–0
FC Moscow	0–1	1–4	1–1	2–2	1–1	0–3	3–0		1–2	0–0	2–1	2–1	1–3	0–0	2–1	0–2
Rubin Kazan	1–0	0–0	1–0	2–0	3–0	1–2	1–0	0–1		0–0	1–1	0–3	3–0	1–3	2–1	4–1
Saturn	0–0	0–4	2–0	2–2	0–0	1–2	2–1	0–0	1–2		4–0	0–0	1–1	3–1	2–0	1–1
Shinnik Yaroslavl	1–2	1–0	2–0	3–2	0–0	1–2	1–2	0–1	0–2	0–1		1–2	2–1	1–1	0–1	2–2
Spartak Moscow	1–1	1–5	1–1	1–1	0–1	0–1	3–0	1–1	0–1	1–0	4–2		2–1	3–1	1–0	1–3
Spartak Nalchik	0–1	0–0	0–2	1–2	1–1	0–1	2–2	0–3	2–0	2–1	2–1	1–2		2–0	1–1	2–2
Terek Grozny	0–1	1–0	0–0	1–0	0–3	2–1	2–1	1–1	0–0	1–0	0–0	3–1	2–1		1–3	1–4
Tom Tomsk	0–1	0–0	0–0	3–1	0–4	0–1	1–1	2–1	1–2	0–1	2–1	0–1	1–0	2–0		1–1
Zenit St. Petersburg	2–0	1–3	1–1	1–0	1–1	1–1	8–1	2–1	1–3	2–2	1–3	0–0	3–4	3–1	5–1	

Source: RFPL (in Russian)
Legend: Blue = home team win; Yellow = draw; Red = away team win.

== Season statistics ==
=== Top goalscorers ===
As of matches played on 22 November 2008.

Rank	Player	Club	Goal
1	(Brazil) Vágner Love	CSKA	20
2	(Bosnia and Herzegovina) Marko Topić	Saturn	10
2	(Nigeria) Peter Odemwingie	Lokomotiv	10
2	(Portugal) Danny	Dynamo / Zenit	10
2	(Russia) Eldar Nizamutdinov	Khimki	10
6	(Russia) Diniyar Bilyaletdinov	Lokomotiv	9
7	(Russia) Alan Dzagoev	CSKA	8
7	(Turkey) Fatih Tekke	Zenit	8
7	(Russia) Anton Bobyor	Krylia	8
7	(Argentina) Héctor Bracamonte	Moscow	8
7	(Bulgaria) Martin Kushev	Amkar	8

== Awards ==
On 16 December 2008 Russian Football Union named its list of 33 top players:

Goalkeepers

1. (Russia) Igor Akinfeev (CSKA)
2. (Russia) Sergei Ryzhikov (Rubin)
3. (Russia) Vyacheslav Malafeev (Zenit)

Right backs

1. (Russia) Aleksandr Anyukov (Zenit)
2. (Argentina) Cristian Ansaldi (Rubin)
3. (Russia) Vasili Berezutskiy (CSKA)

Right-centre backs

1. (Russia) Denis Kolodin (Dynamo)
2. (Brazil) Rodolfo (Lokomotiv)
3. (Russia) Dmitri Belorukov (Amkar)

Left-centre backs

1. (Russia) Sergei Ignashevich (CSKA)
2. (Argentina) Leandro Fernández (Dynamo)
3. (Russia) Aleksei Popov (Amkar/Rubin)

Left backs

1. (Czech Republic) Radek Šírl (Zenit)
2. (Russia) Aleksei Berezutskiy (CSKA)
3. (Russia) Renat Yanbaev (Lokomotiv)

Defensive midfielders

1. (Ukraine) Anatoliy Tymoschuk (Zenit)
2. (Russia) Sergei Semak (Rubin)
3. (Russia) Dmitri Khokhlov (Dynamo)

Right wingers

1. (Serbia) Miloš Krasić (CSKA)
2. (Russia) Igor Denisov (Zenit)
3. (Russia) Kirill Kombarov (Dynamo)

Central midfielders

1. (Portugal) Danny (Dynamo/Zenit)
2. (Russia) Igor Semshov (Dynamo)
3. (Russia) Alan Dzagoev (CSKA)

Left wingers

1. (Russia) Yuri Zhirkov (CSKA)
2. (Russia) Konstantin Zyryanov (Zenit)
3. (Russia) Diniyar Bilyaletdinov (Lokomotiv)

Right forwards

1. (Brazil) Vágner Love (CSKA)
2. (Russia) Pavel Pogrebnyak (Zenit)
3. (Russia) Roman Pavlyuchenko (Spartak M.)

Left forwards

1. (Russia) Andrei Arshavin (Zenit)
2. (Bosnia and Herzegovina) Marko Topić (Saturn)
3. (Turkey) Gökdeniz Karadeniz (Rubin)

== Medal squads ==
1. FC Rubin Kazan

Goalkeepers: Sergei Ryzhikov (26), Sergei Kozko (6).
Defenders: Cristian Ansaldi (Argentina) (27 / 1), Roman Sharonov (26 / 1), Dato Kvirkvelia (Georgia (country)) (24 / 3), Stjepan Tomas (Croatia) (19), Lasha Salukvadze (Georgia (country)) (15), Aleksandr Orekhov (10), Aleksei Popov (7), Jefthon (Brazil) (2), Andrei Fyodorov (Uzbekistan) (1), Gabriel Atz (Brazil) (1).
Midfielders: Gökdeniz Karadeniz (Turkey) (27 / 6), Sergei Semak (27 / 5), MacBeth Sibaya (South Africa) (25), Serhii Rebrov (Ukraine) (24 / 5), Aleksandr Ryazantsev (22 / 1), Christian Noboa (Ecuador) (21 / 6), Andrei Kobenko (17 / 2), Yevgeni Balyaikin (10), Aleksei Rebko (3), Vagiz Galiullin (Uzbekistan) (1), Pyotr Gitselov (Sweden) (1).
Forwards: Hasan Kabze (Turkey) (23 / 2), Aleksandr Bukharov (20 / 6), Roman Adamov (13 / 1), Savo Milošević (Serbia) (16 / 3).
(league appearances and goals listed in brackets)

Manager: Kurban Berdyev.

Transferred out during the season: Gabriel Atz (Brazil) (on loan to FC Khimki), Pyotr Gitselov (Sweden) (on loan to FC Rostov), Aleksei Rebko (to FC Moscow).

2. PFC CSKA Moscow

Goalkeepers: Igor Akinfeev (30).
Defenders: Sergei Ignashevich (28 / 4), Vasili Berezutski (28), Aleksei Berezutski (24 / 2), Deividas Šemberas (Lithuania) (24), Chidi Odiah (Nigeria) (23), Anton Grigoryev (16).
Midfielders: Miloš Krasić (Serbia) (28 / 6), Yuri Zhirkov (28 / 3), Evgeni Aldonin (25 / 3), Elvir Rahimić (Bosnia and Herzegovina) (23), Alan Dzagoev (20 / 8), Caner Erkin (Turkey) (18 / 1), Pavel Mamayev (17 / 2), Dudu (Brazil) (10 / 1), Luboš Kalouda (Czech Republic) (1).
Forwards: Vágner Love (Brazil) (26 / 20), Ricardo Jesus (Brazil) (10), Jô (Brazil) (8 / 3), Dmitri Ryzhov (8), Ramón (Brazil) (7), Daniel Carvalho (Brazil) (4), Dawid Janczyk (Poland) (4).
Manager: Valery Gazzaev.

Transferred out during the season: Dudu (Brazil) (to (Greece) Olympiacos), Jô (Brazil) (to (England) Manchester City), Daniel Carvalho (Brazil) (on loan to (Brazil) Internacional).

3. FC Dynamo Moscow

Goalkeepers: Vladimir Gabulov (12), Žydrūnas Karčemarskas (Lithuania) (9), Anton Shunin (9).
Defenders: Leandro Fernández (Argentina) (28 / 4), Denis Kolodin (22 / 1), Jovan Tanasijević (Montenegro) (20 / 1), Marcin Kowalczyk (Poland) (20), Aleksandr Dimidko (12 / 2), Luke Wilkshire (Australia) (11 / 2), Vladimir Granat (11), Arūnas Klimavičius (Lithuania) (9 / 1), Nikita Chicherin (3), Aleksandr Tochilin (3).
Midfielders: Dmitri Kombarov (30 / 1), Igor Semshov (29 / 6), Dmitri Khokhlov (27 / 2), Kirill Kombarov (26 / 1), Danny (Portugal) (18 / 5), Andrei Karpovich (Kazakhstan) (12), Aleksandr Denisov (1).
Forwards: Aleksandr Kerzhakov (27 / 7), Tsvetan Genkov (Bulgaria) (23 / 4), Aleksandr Kokorin (7 / 2), Fyodor Smolov (7 / 1).

Manager: Andrey Kobelev.

Transferred out during the season: Danny (Portugal) (to FC Zenit St. Petersburg), Aleksandr Denisov (on loan to FC Salyut-Energia Belgorod).

== Attendances ==
Rank	Club	Average
1	Krylia Sovetov	21,700
2	Spartak Moscow	21,413
3	Zenit	20,578
4	Rubin	18,434
5	Amkar	16,494
6	PFC CSKA	15,110
7	Lokomotiv Moscow	14,108
8	Dynamo Moscow	13,067
9	Tom	12,820
10	Shinnik	10,300
11	Spartak Nalchik	10,293
12	Saturn	9,193
13	Terek	8,731
14	Luch	8,413
15	Khimki	8,181
16	FC Moscow	4,513
