= Dmitri Samoylov =

Dmitri Samoylov may refer to:

- Dmitry Samoylov (pilot) (1922–2012), credited as a flying ace in the Korean War
- Dmitri Samoylov (footballer, born 1990), Russian football player
- Dmitri Samoylov (footballer, born 1993), Russian football player
