= Yushchenko (surname) =

Yushchenko (Ukrainian: Ющенко) is a Ukrainian surname. Notable people with the surname include:

- Viktor Yushchenko (born 1954), third President of Ukraine (2005–2010)
- Kateryna Yushchenko (born 1961), wife of Viktor Yushchenko
- Kateryna Yushchenko (scientist) (1919–2001), Ukrainian computer scientist
- Igor Yushchenko (born 1969), Russian football coach
