= Kisurin =

Kisurin (Russian: Кисурин) is a Russian masculine surname, its feminine counterpart is Kisurina. Notable people with the surname include:

- Anatoli Kisurin (born 1969), Russian football player
- Evgeni Kisurin (born 1969), Russian basketball player
