= Yashan (name) =

Yashan is both a given name and a surname. Notable people with the name include:

- Yashan Samarasinghe (born 1994), Sri Lankan cricketer
- Aleksandr Yashan (born 1990), Russian footballer
