= List of Bosnia and Herzegovina international footballers born outside Bosnia and Herzegovina =

In this list there are the footballers who played for the Bosnia and Herzegovina senior national football team who are born outside Bosnia and Herzegovina, who played at least one match with the national team. Naturalized Bosnian players are included too.

== List of players ==
-Players in bold are currently playing for Bosnia and Herzegovina

-Last update on 14 November 2026

=== Austria ===
Birthplace	Player	Period	Caps	Goals	Notes	Ref.
Zell am See	Amar Dedić	2022–	32	1		
Salzburg	Jusuf Gazibegović	2021–	23	0		
Wels	Ermin Mahmić	2026–	10	3	He also represented Austria U17, U19 and U21.	
Vienna	Dal Varešanović	2023–	2	0		
Linz	Emir Karić	2025–	1	0	He also represented Austria U19 and U21.	
Salzburg	Salko Hamzić	2026–	1	0	He also represented Austria U19.	

=== Belgium ===
Birthplace	Player	Period	Caps	Goals	Notes	Ref.
Liège	**Deni Milošević**	2018–	11	1	He also represented Belgium U16, U17 and U18.	

=== Brazil ===
Birthplace	Player	Period	Caps	Goals	Notes	Ref.
Ilhéus	Ricardo Baiano	2004	1	0	He is a naturalized citizen of Bosnia and Herzegovina.	

=== Canada ===
Birthplace	Player	Period	Caps	Goals	Notes	Ref.
Toronto	**Luka Kulenović**	2024–	3	0		

=== Croatia ===
Birthplace	Player	Period	Caps	Goals	Notes	Ref.
Dubrovnik (then (Socialist Federal Republic of Yugoslavia) SFR Yugoslavia)	Emir Spahić	2003–2018	94	6		
Zagreb (then (Socialist Federal Republic of Yugoslavia) SFR Yugoslavia)	Jasmin Mujdža	1998–2000	37	0		
Sinj (then (Socialist Federal Republic of Yugoslavia) SFR Yugoslavia)	Mirko Hrgović	2003–2009	29	3		
Imotski	**Ivan Bašić**	2023–	25	1		
Dubrovnik (then (Socialist Federal Republic of Yugoslavia) SFR Yugoslavia)	**Elvis Sarić**	2018–2021	19	1		
Split	**Luka Menalo**	2018–	16	3		
Imotski (then (Socialist Federal Republic of Yugoslavia) SFR Yugoslavia)	Ivan Radeljić	2007–2009	10	0	He also played for Croatia U20	
Zagreb (then (Socialist Federal Republic of Yugoslavia) SFR Yugoslavia)	Mensur Mujdža	2010–2015	9	0	He also played for Croatia U20 and U21.	
Split	**Branimir Cipetić**	2020–	7	0		
Slavonski Brod (then (Socialist Federal Republic of Yugoslavia) SFR Yugoslavia)	**Mario Vrančić**	2015–2017	6	0	He also played for Germany U17, U19 and U20.	
Slavonski Brod (then (Socialist Federal Republic of Yugoslavia) SFR Yugoslavia)	Damir Vrančić	2012	4	0		
Split (then (Socialist Federal Republic of Yugoslavia) SFR Yugoslavia)	Ivan Medvid	2001–2005	3	0	He also played for Croatia U21	
Split	**Hrvoje Barišić**	2021–	1	0	He also played for Croatia U21	
Slavonski Brod (then (Socialist Federal Republic of Yugoslavia) SFR Yugoslavia)	Dario Purić	2010	1	0		
Split (then (Socialist Federal Republic of Yugoslavia) SFR Yugoslavia)	Dragan Stojkić	2002	1	0		

=== Denmark ===
Birthplace	Player	Period	Caps	Goals	Notes	Ref.
Nexø	**Amir Hadžiahmetović**	2020–	37	0		

=== France ===
Birthplace	Player	Period	Caps	Goals	Notes	Ref.
Strasbourg	Sanel Jahić	2008–2012	23	1		
Belfort	Sanjin Prcić	2014–2023	18	0		

=== Germany ===
Birthplace	Player	Period	Caps	Goals	Notes	Ref.
Munich (then West Germany)	Zvjezdan Misimović	2004–2018	85	25	He also played for FR Yugoslavia U18 and U21	
Karlsruhe	**Sead Kolašinac**	2013–	74	1	He also played for Germany U18, U19 and U20.	
Hamburg	**Ermedin Demirović**	2021–	49	4		
Berlin	**Muhamed Bešić**	2010–2022	47	0		
Hamburg (then West Germany)	Zlatan Bajramović	2002–2009	37	3		
Hamm	**Dženis Burnić**	2024–	22	0	He also played for Germany U15, U16, U17, U18, U19, U20 and U21.	
Cologne	**Kerim Alajbegović**	2025–	18	3		
Stuttgart	**Adrian Leon Barišić**	2023–	16	0		
Munich (then West Germany)	Ivica Grlić	2004–2007	16	2		
Erbach im Odenwald	**Denis Huseinbašić**	2024–	7	0	He also played for Germany under-21	
Cologne	**Damir Sadiković**	2021–	1	0		

=== Italy ===
Birthplace	Player	Period	Caps	Goals	Notes	Ref.
Cento	**Dario Šarić**	2022–	10	0		

=== Netherlands ===
Birthplace	Player	Period	Caps	Goals	Notes	Ref.
Leiderdorp	**Said Hamulić**	2023–	6	0		

=== North Macedonia ===
Birthplace	Player	Period	Caps	Goals	Notes	Ref.
Prilep (then (North Macedonia) Republic of Macedonia)	**Haris Hajradinović**	2019–	16	1		

=== Portugal ===
Birthplace	Player	Period	Caps	Goals	Notes	Ref.
Viseu	**Dino Beširović**	2018–	5	0		

=== Serbia ===
Birthplace	Player	Period	Caps	Goals	Notes	Ref.
Novi Pazar (then Serbia and Montenegro)	**Samed Baždar**	2024–	15	1	He also played for Serbia U15, U16, U17, U19, U21 and the Serbian senior national team.	
Subotica (then (Socialist Federal Republic of Yugoslavia) SFR Yugoslavia)	Ninoslav Milenković	2004–2006	15	0		
Šabac (then (Federal Republic of Yugoslavia) FR Yugoslavia)	**Jovo Lukić**	2021–	9	1		
Belgrade (then (Socialist Federal Republic of Yugoslavia) SFR Yugoslavia)	Dušan Kerkez	2004–2006	5	0		
Prijepolje (then (Socialist Federal Republic of Yugoslavia) SFR Yugoslavia)	Almir Gredić	2000–2005	4	0		
Novi Pazar (then (Federal Republic of Yugoslavia) FR Yugoslavia)	**Almedin Ziljkić**	2020–	3	0		
Novi Pazar (then (Socialist Federal Republic of Yugoslavia) SFR Yugoslavia)	Albin Pelak	2002–2005	2	0		
Belgrade (then (Socialist Federal Republic of Yugoslavia) SFR Yugoslavia)	Vladimir Karalić	2007	1	0		
Bečej (then (Socialist Federal Republic of Yugoslavia) SFR Yugoslavia)	Ilija Prodanović	2009	1	0		
Sjenica (then (Federal Republic of Yugoslavia) FR Yugoslavia)	**Ifet Đakovac**	2024–	1	0		

=== Slovenia ===
Birthplace	Player	Period	Caps	Goals	Notes	Ref.
Ljubljana	**Tarik Muharemović**	2024–	21	2		
Jesenice	**Arjan Malić**	2025–	10	0	He also played for the Slovenia U19	
Ljubljana	**Dino Hotić**	2019–	4	0	He also played for the Slovenia U17, U19, U21 and the Slovenian national football B team.	

=== Spain ===
Birthplace	Player	Period	Caps	Goals	Notes	Ref.
San Sebastián	**Kenan Kodro**	2017–	15	2		
Valladolid	**Elvir Koljić**	2018–	4	0		

=== Sweden ===
Birthplace	Player	Period	Caps	Goals	Notes	Ref.
Spånga-Tensta	Benjamin Tahirović	2023–	36	2		
Malmö	Dennis Hadžikadunić	2020–	33	0	He also played for the Sweden U17, U19, U21 and the Swedish senior national team.	
Lund	Armin Gigović	2024–	27	3	He also played for the Sweden U17, U19, U21 and the Swedish senior national team.	
Malmö	Anel Ahmedhodžić	2020–	25	0	He also played for the Sweden U17, U19, U21 and the Swedish senior national team.	
Sölvesborg	Adi Nalić	2021–	9	0	He also played for the Sweden U17, U19, U21 and the Swedish senior national team.	
Stockholm	Zinedin Smajlović	2026–	3	0	He also played for the Sweden U21 national football team	

=== Switzerland ===
Birthplace	Player	Period	Caps	Goals	Notes	Ref.
Brugg	Izet Hajrović	2013–2019	27	6	He also played for Switzerland U20, U21, and the Swiss senior national team.	
Grenchen	**Haris Tabaković**	2023–	16	5	He also played for Switzerland U18, U19 and U21.	
Bellinzona	Danijel Milićević	2016–2017	3	0	He also played for Switzerland U19, U20 and U21.	
Rorschach	Daniel Pavlović	2017–2018	2	0	He also played for Switzerland U19, U20 and U21.	
Suhr	**Eman Košpo**	2025–	1	0	He also played for and Switzerland U15, U16, U17 and U18.	

=== United States ===
Birthplace	Player	Period	Caps	Goals	Notes	Ref.
Appleton	**Esmir Bajraktarević**	2024–	25	1	He also played for United States U19, U23, and the United States senior national team.	

== List by country of birth ==
Country	Total
Croatia	15
Germany	11
Serbia	10
Sweden	6
Switzerland	5
Austria	4
Slovenia	3
France	2
Spain	2
Belgium	1
Brazil	1
Canada	1
Denmark	1
Italy	1
Netherlands	1
North Macedonia	1
Portugal	1
United States	1
