= Kulemin =

Kulemin or Kulyomin (Russian: Кулемин, Кулёмин, from kulema meaning a trap for hunting small animals) is a Russian masculine surname, its feminine counterpart is Kulemina or Kulyomina. It may refer to

- Kirill Kulemin (born 1980), Russian rugby union player
- Maksim Kulyomin (born 1989), Russian footballer
- Nikolay Kulemin (born 1986), Russian ice hockey player
- Vyacheslav Kulyomin (born 1990), Russian ice hockey forward
