= Aleksei Popov (footballer, born 1978) =

Kazakh footballer (born 1978)

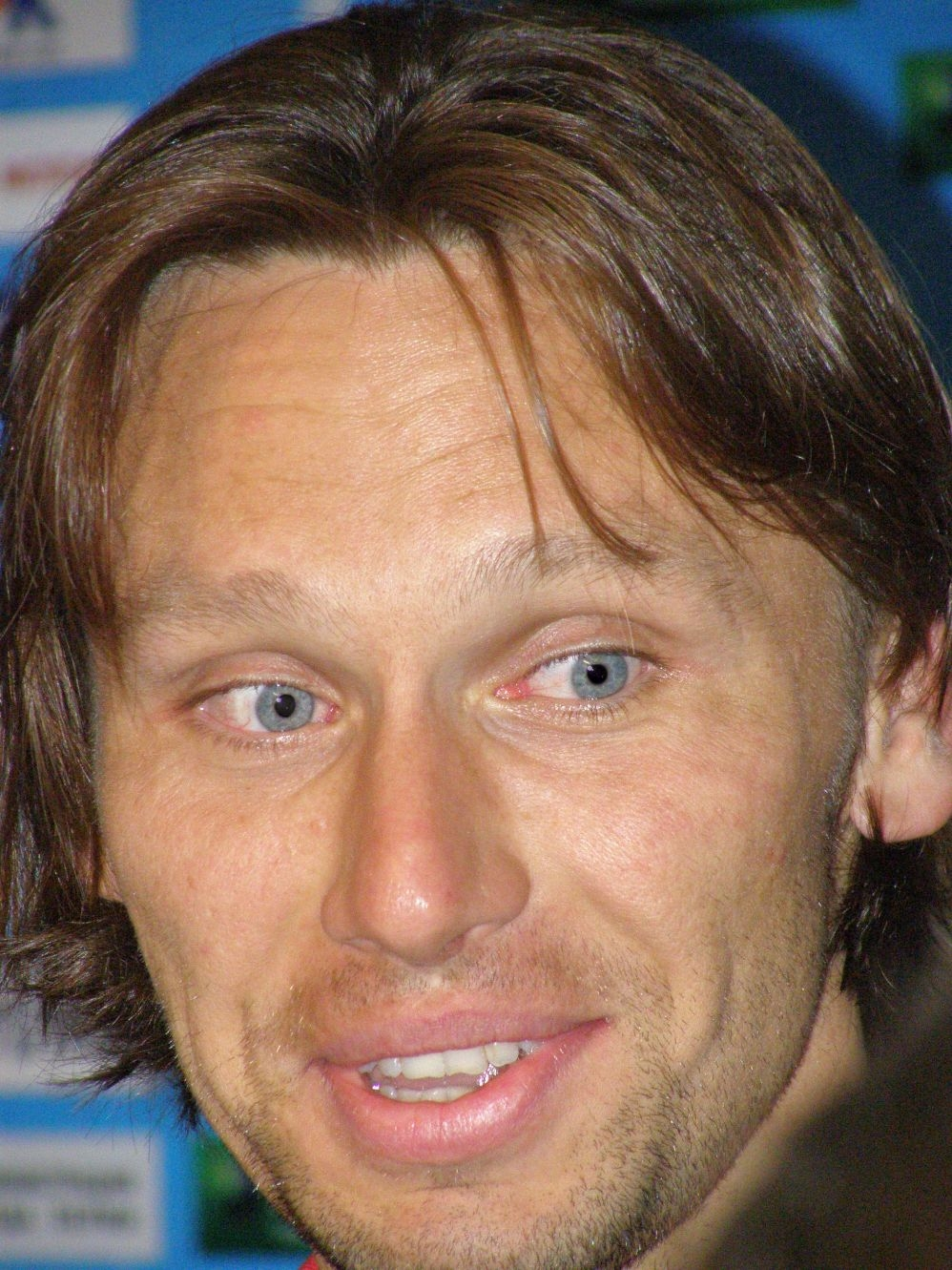

Personal information
- Full name: Aleksei Vladislavovich Popov
- Date of birth: 7 July 1978 (age 48)
- Place of birth: Perm, Russian SFSR
- Height: 1.88 m (6 ft 2 in)
- Position: Centre-back

Youth career
- SDYuShOR Perm

Senior career*
Years	Team	Apps	(Gls)
1995	Zvezda Perm	17	(0)
1996–2008	Amkar Perm	374	(9)
2008–2010	Rubin Kazan	17	(0)
2010–2013	Amkar Perm	53	(0)

International career
2010	Kazakhstan	4	(0)

Managerial career
- 2013–2018: Amkar Perm (U19 assistant)
- 2018–2019: Zvezda Perm (assistant)
- * Club domestic league appearances and goals

Aleksei Vladislavovich Popov (Russian: Алексей Владиславович Попов; born 7 July 1978) is a football coach and a former player. Born in Russia, he played for the Kazakhstan national team.

== Career statistics ==
=== Club ===
As of Match played 11 May 2013

Appearances and goals by club, season and competition
Club	Season	League			National Cup		Continental		Other		Total	
Club	Season	Division	Apps	Goals	Apps	Goals	Apps	Goals	Apps	Goals	Apps	Goals
Zvezda Perm	1995	Russian Second Division	17	0	1	0	–		–		18	0
Amkar Perm	1996	Russian Second Division	12	0	2	0	-		-		14	0
Amkar Perm	1997	Russian Second Division	34	0	1	0	-		-		35	0
Amkar Perm	1998	Russian Second Division	31	1	5	1	-		-		36	2
Amkar Perm	1999	Russian First Division	41	1	1	0	-		-		42	1
Amkar Perm	2000	Russian First Division	32	1	4	0	-		-		36	1
Amkar Perm	2001	Russian First Division	28	1	4	0	-		-		32	1
Amkar Perm	2002	Russian First Division	34	3	1	0	-		-		35	3
Amkar Perm	2003	Russian First Division	41	0	3	0	-		-		44	0
Amkar Perm	2004	Russian Premier League	27	0	6	0	-		-		33	0
Amkar Perm	2005	Russian Premier League	20	0	1	0	-		-		21	0
Amkar Perm	2006	Russian Premier League	24	0	1	0	-		-		25	0
Amkar Perm	2007	Russian Premier League	29	2	4	0	-		-		33	2
Amkar Perm	2008	Russian Premier League	18	0	1	0	-		-		19	0
Amkar Perm	Total		371	9	34	1	-	-	-	-	405	10
Rubin Kazan	2008	Russian Premier League	7	0	1	0	-		-		8	0
Rubin Kazan	2009	Russian Premier League	10	0	0	0	2	0	-		12	0
Rubin Kazan	Total		17	0	1	0	2	0	-	-	19	0
Amkar Perm	2010	Russian Premier League	25	0	2	0	-		-		27	0
Amkar Perm	2011–12	Russian Premier League	19	0	1	0	-		-		20	0
Amkar Perm	2012–13	Russian Premier League	9	0	0	0	-		-		9	0
Amkar Perm	Total		53	0	3	0	-	-	-	-	56	0
Career total			458	9	38	1	2	0	-	-	498	10

=== International ===
Kazakhstan
Year	Apps	Goals
2010	4	0
Total	4	0

Statistics accurate as of match played 12 October 2010

== Honours ==
Amkar Perm

- Russian Second Division Ural (1): 1998
- Russian First Division (1): 2003

Rubin Kazan

- Russian Premier League (2): 2008, 2009
