= Roman Slavnov =

Russian footballer

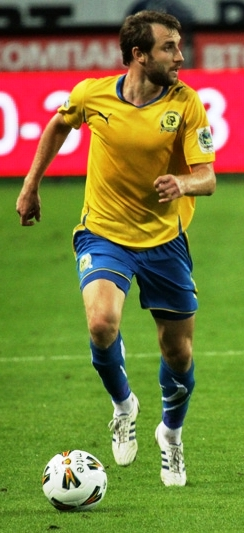

Personal information
- Full name: Roman Aleksandrovich Slavnov
- Date of birth: 28 April 1982 (age 44)
- Place of birth: Moscow, Soviet Union
- Height: 1.78 m (5 ft 10 in)
- Position: Midfielder

Youth career
- FC Spartak Shchyolkovo

Senior career*
Years	Team	Apps	(Gls)
2002–2003	FC Torpedo-Metallurg Moscow	8	(0)
2004–2006	FC Sodovik Sterlitamak	107	(16)
2007	FC Shinnik Yaroslavl	31	(1)
2008	FC Luch-Energiya Vladivostok	0	(0)
2008	FC Salyut-Energia Belgorod	21	(4)
2009–2010	FC KAMAZ Naberezhnye Chelny	43	(2)
2011–2012	FC Luch-Energiya Vladivostok	42	(6)
2012–2014	FC SKA-Energiya Khabarovsk	51	(5)
2014–2016	FC Luch-Energiya Vladivostok	47	(9)
2016	FC Baltika Kaliningrad	14	(1)
- * Club domestic league appearances and goals

Roman Aleksandrovich Slavnov (Russian: Роман Александрович Славнов; born 28 April 1982) is a former Russian professional footballer.

== Club career ==
He made his debut in the Russian Premier League in 2003 for FC Torpedo-Metallurg Moscow.
