= Dmitri Kudinov (footballer, born 1985) =

Russian footballer

Personal information
- Full name: Dmitri Vladimirovich Kudinov
- Date of birth: 25 August 1985 (age 41)
- Height: 1.85 m (6 ft 1 in)
- Position: Defender

Senior career*
Years	Team	Apps	(Gls)
2002–2003	FC Shinnik Yaroslavl	0	(0)
2004	FC Moscow	0	(0)
2005–2007	FC Torpedo Moscow	4	(0)
2006	→ FC Anzhi Makhachkala (loan)	4	(0)
2007	→ FC Avangard Kursk (loan)	9	(3)
2008	FC Luch-Energiya Vladivostok	0	(0)
2008	FC Salyut-Energia Belgorod	21	(2)
2009–2010	FC KAMAZ Naberezhnye Chelny	4	(0)
2010	→ FC Avangard Kursk (loan)	24	(0)
2011–2012	FC SKA-Energiya Khabarovsk	31	(0)
2012–2013	FC Petrotrest Saint Petersburg	19	(0)
2013	FC Dynamo Saint Petersburg	14	(0)
2014	FC Volga Tver	10	(0)
2014–2015	FC Saturn Ramenskoye	20	(1)
2015	FC Domodedovo Moscow	15	(0)
2016	FC Mika	10	(0)
- * Club domestic league appearances and goals

Dmitri Vladimirovich Kudinov (Russian: Дмитрий Владимирович Кудинов; born 25 August 1985) is a Russian former professional footballer.

== Club career ==
He made his debut in the Russian Premier League in 2005 for FC Torpedo Moscow.
