= Sergei Chernogayev =

Russian footballer

Personal information
- Full name: Sergei Yevgenyevich Chernogayev
- Date of birth: 20 March 1983 (age 43)
- Height: 1.75 m (5 ft 9 in)
- Position: Defender

Youth career
- FC Torpedo Moscow

Senior career*
Years	Team	Apps	(Gls)
2000	FC Torpedo-2 Moscow	12	(0)
2001–2003	FC Torpedo Moscow (reserves)		
2001–2007	FC Torpedo Moscow	29	(0)
2003	→ FC Volgar-Gazprom Astrakhan (loan)	18	(1)
2005–2006	→ FC Shinnik Yaroslavl (loan)	22	(1)
2008	FC Luch-Energiya Vladivostok	15	(0)
2009	FC MVD Rossii Moscow	6	(0)
2010	FC Dynamo Saint Petersburg	21	(1)
2011	FC Salyut Belgorod	6	(0)
2011–2012	FC Kaluga	8	(0)

International career
2004–2005	Russia U-21	12	(0)
- * Club domestic league appearances and goals

Sergei Yevgenyevich Chernogayev (Russian: Серге́й Евгеньевич Черногаев; born 20 March 1983) is a Russian former footballer.
