= Aleksandr Sheshukov =

Russian footballer

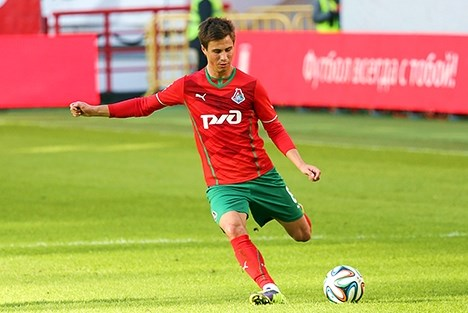
- Sheshukov with Lokomotiv Moscow in 2014

Personal information
- Full name: Aleksandr Sergeyevich Sheshukov
- Date of birth: 15 April 1983 (age 43)
- Place of birth: Omsk, Soviet Union
- Height: 1.80 m (5 ft 11 in)
- Positions: Defensive midfielder; centre-back

Youth career
- SDYuShOR Omsk

Senior career*
Years	Team	Apps	(Gls)
2000	FC Spartak Tambov	9	(0)
2001	→ FC Spartak-Orekhovo (loan)	22	(2)
2002–2003	FC Spartak Moscow	4	(0)
2004	→ FC Sokol-Saratov (loan)	36	(2)
2005–2008	FC Luch-Energiya Vladivostok	85	(3)
2008–2010	FC Moscow	35	(1)
2010–2012	FC Spartak Moscow	43	(1)
2012–2013	FC Rostov	48	(0)
2014–2016	FC Lokomotiv Moscow	24	(0)
2016	FC Arsenal Tula	8	(0)
2017–2018	FC Baltika Kaliningrad	54	(2)
2019–2020	FC Znamya Noginsk (amateur)		
2020–2021	FC Znamya Noginsk	11	(0)

International career
2000	Russia U16		
2003–2005	Russia U21	14	(1)
2011	Russia	1	(0)
- * Club domestic league appearances and goals

Aleksandr Sergeyevich Sheshukov (Russian: Александр Сергеевич Шешуков; born 15 April 1983) is a Russian former footballer who played as a midfielder or defender.

== International career ==
Sheshukov made his debut for the Russia national football team on 7 June 2011 in a friendly against Cameroon.

== Career statistics ==
As of 21 February 2015

Club	Div	Season	League		Cup		Europe		Total	
Club	Div	Season	Apps	Goals	Apps	Goals	Apps	Goals	Apps	Goals
(Russia) Spartak Tambov	D3	2000	9	0	0	0	-		9	0
(Russia) Spartak Tambov	Total		9	0	0	0	0	0	9	0
(Russia) Spartak-Orekhovo	D3	2001	22	2	2	0	-		24	2
(Russia) Spartak-Orekhovo	Total		22	2	2	0	0	0	24	2
(Russia) Spartak Moscow	D1	2002	2	0	0	0	-		2	0
(Russia) Spartak Moscow	D1	2003	2	0	1	0	-		3	0
(Russia) Spartak Moscow	Total		4	0	1	0	0	0	5	0
(Russia) Sokol Saratov	D2	2004	36	2	0	0	-		36	2
(Russia) Sokol Saratov	Total		36	2	0	0	0	0	36	2
(Russia) Luch-Energiya	D2	2005	21	0	2	0	-		23	0
(Russia) Luch-Energiya	D1	2006	28	1	3	1	-		31	2
(Russia) Luch-Energiya	D1	2007	26	2	0	0	-		26	2
(Russia) Luch-Energiya	D1	2008	10	0	0	0	-		10	0
(Russia) Luch-Energiya	Total		85	3	5	1	0	0	90	4
(Russia) FC Moscow	D1	2008	10	0	2	0	2	0	14	0
(Russia) FC Moscow	D1	2009	25	1	4	0	-		29	1
(Russia) FC Moscow	Total		35	1	6	0	2	0	43	1
(Russia) Spartak Moscow	D1	2010	23	1	0	0	6	0	29	1
(Russia) Spartak Moscow	D1	2011–12	20	0	4	0	6	0	30	0
(Russia) Spartak Moscow	Total		43	1	4	0	12	0	59	1
(Russia) FC Rostov	D1	2012–13	27	0	3	0	-		30	0
(Russia) FC Rostov	D1	2013–14	19	0	1	0	-		20	0
(Russia) FC Rostov	Total		46	0	4	0	0	0	50	0
(Russia) Lokomotiv Moscow	D1	2013–14	9	0	-		-		9	0
(Russia) Lokomotiv Moscow	D1	2014–15	10	0	1	0	0	0	11	0
(Russia) Lokomotiv Moscow	Total		19	0	1	0	0	0	20	0
Career total			299	8	23	1	14	0	336	9

== Honours ==
Lokomotiv Moscow

- Russian Cup: 2014–15
