= Roman Melnik =

Russian footballer

Personal information
- Full name: Roman Aleksandrovich Melnik
- Date of birth: 25 May 1977 (age 49)
- Height: 1.73 m (5 ft 8 in)
- Position: Forward

Youth career
- FC Luch Vladivostok

Senior career*
Years	Team	Apps	(Gls)
1992	FC Portovik Vladivostok		
1993–2000	FC Luch Vladivostok	104	(25)
2001	FC Metallurg-ZAPSIB Novokuznetsk	14	(1)
2001–2002	FC Luch Vladivostok	32	(7)
2003	FC Okean Nakhodka	19	(2)
2004	FC Smena Komsomolsk-na-Amure	0	(0)
2004	FC Lokomotiv Ussuriysk (amateur)		
2005	FC Sibiryak Bratsk	23	(4)
2007	FC Aviator Artyom		
2009	FC TINRO Vladivostok		
2009	FC Fortuna Vladivostok		
2009–2010	FC Aviator Artyom		
2010–2011	FC Fortuna Vladivostok		
2011–2012	FC Portovik Vladivostok		
2013	FC Aviator Artyom		
- * Club domestic league appearances and goals

Roman Aleksandrovich Melnik (Russian: Роман Александрович Мельник; born 25 May 1977) is a former Russian football player.
