= Dmitri Smirnov (footballer, born 1980) =

Russian footballer

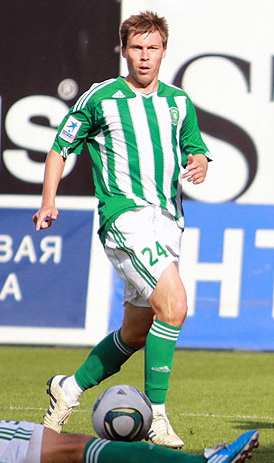

Personal information
- Full name: Dmitri Nikolayevich Smirnov
- Date of birth: 9 November 1980 (age 45)
- Place of birth: Moscow, Soviet Union
- Height: 1.87 m (6 ft 1 1/2 in)
- Position: Defender

Youth career
- FShM Moscow

Senior career*
| Years | Team | Apps | (Gls) |
| 1998–2003 | FC Torpedo-ZIL Moscow | 51 | (1) |
| 2004–2005 | FC Fakel Voronezh | 41 | (8) |
| 2005 | FC Khimki | 15 | (4) |
| 2006–2008 | FC Luch-Energiya Vladivostok | 67 | (2) |
| 2009–2012 | FC Tom Tomsk | 64 | (2) |
| 2012 | FC Torpedo Moscow | 3 | (0) |
- * Club domestic league appearances and goals

Dmitri Nikolayevich Smirnov (Russian: Дмитрий Николаевич Смирнов; born 9 November 1980) is a Russian former footballer. He is not related to Dmitry Alexandrovich Smirnov with whom he played on the same team for several years for FC Torpedo-ZIL Moscow, Luch and Tom. To avoid confusion, he is usually referred to as Dmitri N. Smirnov.
