= Maksim Nasadyuk =

Russian footballer

Personal information
- Full name: Maksim Aleksandrovich Nasadyuk
- Date of birth: 11 February 1989 (age 37)
- Place of birth: Vladivostok, Russian SFSR
- Height: 1.82 m (6 ft 0 in)
- Position: Defender

Senior career*
Years	Team	Apps	(Gls)
2008–2009	FC Luch-Energiya Vladivostok	0	(0)
2010	FC Okean Nakhodka	28	(0)
2011	FC Torpedo Vladivostok		
2012–2014	FC Belogorsk		
2015–2020	FC Luch Vladivostok	110	(3)
2020	FC Zenit Irkutsk	12	(1)
2021	FC Dynamo Vladivostok	19	(0)
- * Club domestic league appearances and goals

Maksim Aleksandrovich Nasadyuk (Russian: Максим Александрович Насадюк; born 11 February 1989) is a Russian former professional football player.

== Club career ==
He made his Russian Football National League debut for FC Luch-Energiya Vladivostok on 18 March 2015 in a game against FC Sibir Novosibirsk.
