= Andrei Fedyakin =

Russian footballer and coach

Personal information
- Full name: Andrei Anatolyevich Fedyakin
- Date of birth: 8 May 1959 (age 67)
- Place of birth: Vladivostok, Russian SFSR
- Height: 1.74 m (5 ft 8 1/2 in)
- Position: Defender

Senior career*
Years	Team	Apps	(Gls)
1979–1982	FC Luch Vladivostok	68	(0)
1985–1996	FC Luch Vladivostok	326	(5)

Managerial career
- 1996–1997: FC Luch Vladivostok (assistant)
- 1998–1999: FC Luch Vladivostok
- 2000: FC Luch Vladivostok (assistant)
- 2002–2003: FC Luch-Energia Vladivostok (assistant)
- 2006–2010: FC Mostovik-Primorye Ussuriysk
- * Club domestic league appearances and goals

Andrei Anatolyevich Fedyakin (Russian: Андрей Анатольевич Федякин; born 8 June 1959) is a Russian professional football coach and a former player.
