= Matija Kristić =

Croatian footballer and manager

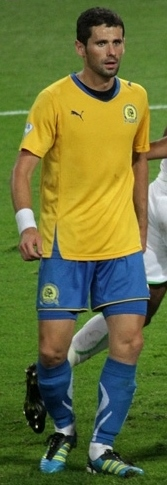

Personal information
- Full name: Matija Kristić
- Date of birth: 10 October 1978 (age 48)
- Place of birth: Varaždin, SFR Yugoslavia
- Height: 1.83 m (6 ft 0 in)
- Position: Defender

Senior career*
Years	Team	Apps	(Gls)
1996–2005	Varteks	125	(7)
1997–1998	→ Sloboda Varaždin (loan)	18	(1)
2005–2006	Zagłębie Lubin	4	(1)
2006–2008	Slaven Belupo	58	(3)
2008–2012	Luch-Energiya Vladivostok	99	(1)
2012–2013	Zelina	23	(6)
2013–2014	SV Neuberg	26	(5)
2014	Zavrč	16	(0)
2015–2017	Međimurje	46	(6)
2023–2024	NK Obreš	19	(7)
Total		434	(37)

Managerial career
- 2018–2019: Međimurje
- 2019: Zelina
- 2020: Podravina
- 2020–2022: Polet
- * Club domestic league appearances and goals

Matija Kristić (born 10 October 1978) is a Croatian professional football manager and former player who played as a defender.

== Club career ==
Kristić had spells in the Polish, Russian and Slovene top flights as well as one with Austrian third tier-side SV Neuberg.
