= Dmitri Samoylov (footballer, born 1990) =

Russian footballer

Personal information
- Full name: Dmitri Sergeyevich Samoylov
- Date of birth: 20 April 1990 (age 36)
- Height: 1.76 m (5 ft 9 1/2 in)
- Position: Striker

Senior career*
Years	Team	Apps	(Gls)
2006–2009	FC Luch-Energiya Vladivostok	6	(0)
2009	FC Smena Komsomolsk-na-Amure	6	(0)
2010	FC Luch-Energiya-M Vladivostok		
2010	FC Mostovik-Primorye Ussuriysk	10	(3)
2011	FC Spasatel Vladivostok		
2011–2013	FC Smena Komsomolsk-na-Amure	48	(5)
2014	FC Smena Komsomolsk-na-Amure	8	(1)
- * Club domestic league appearances and goals

Dmitri Sergeyevich Samoylov (Russian: Дмитрий Серге́евич Самойлов; born 20 April 1990) is a former Russian professional football player.

== Club career ==
He played in the Russian Football National League for FC Luch-Energiya Vladivostok in 2009.
