= Vital Lanko =

Belarusian footballer

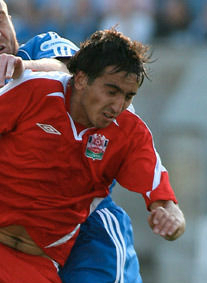

Personal information
- Full name: Vital Alyaksandravich Lanko
- Date of birth: 4 April 1977 (age 49)
- Place of birth: Mogilev, Belarusian SSR, Soviet Union
- Height: 1.85 m (6 ft 1 in)
- Position: Forward

Senior career*
Years	Team	Apps	(Gls)
1995–1997	Torpedo-Kadino Mogilev	47	(0)
1998–1999	Dnepr-Transmash Mogilev	55	(15)
2000	Belshina Bobruisk	26	(6)
2001	Fakel Voronezh	8	(0)
2002	Belshina Bobruisk	0	(0)
2002–2003	Kristall Smolensk	35	(4)
2003	Volyn Lutsk	23	(1)
2004	Uralan Elista	17	(8)
2005	Metallurg-Kuzbass Novokuznetsk	13	(1)
2006–2007	Spartak Nalchik	43	(3)
2007–2008	Luch-Energiya Vladivostok	21	(0)
2009	Salyut-Energia Belgorod	12	(2)
2009	Chernomorets Novorossiysk	13	(1)
2010	Belshina Bobruisk	32	(4)
2011–2012	Torpedo Zhodino	42	(2)
2016	Torpedo Mogilev	2	(0)
Total		387	(47)

International career
1998–1999	Belarus U21	6	(1)
2004–2006	Belarus	6	(0)
- * Club domestic league appearances and goals

Vital Alyaksandravich Lanko (Belarusian: Віталь Аляксандравіч Ланько, Russian: Виталий Александрович Ланько, Vitali Aleksandrovich Lanko; born 4 April 1977) is a former professional Belarusian footballer.

== Career ==
=== International career ===
He made his debut for the national side on 19 February 2004, in friendly match against Romania.

=== Honours ===
Dnepr-Transmash Mogilev

- Belarusian Premier League champion: 1998

Belshina Bobruisk

- Belarusian Cup winner: 2000–01

== Match fixing involvement ==
In July 2020 Lanko was found guilty of being involved in a match-fixing schema in Belarusian Premier League. He was sentenced to 3 years of an open prison (khimiya).
