= Aleksey Polyakov =

Uzbekistani footballer (born 1974)

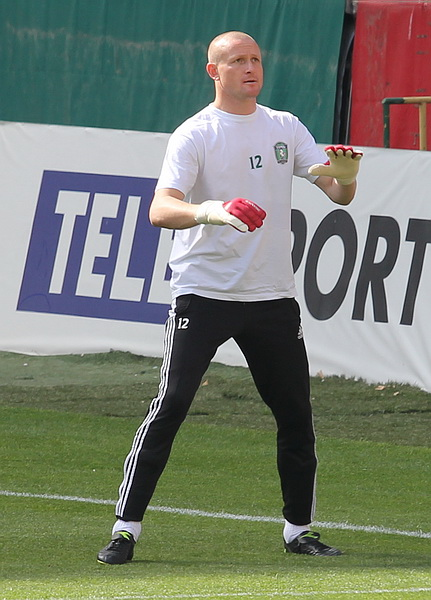

Personal information
- Date of birth: 28 February 1974 (age 52)
- Place of birth: Shebekino, Russia, USSR
- Height: 1.89 m (6 ft 2 in)
- Position: Goalkeeper

Team information
- Current team: Academy FC Lokomotiv Moscow (GK coach)

Youth career
- Salyut

Senior career*
Years	Team	Apps	(Gls)
1993–1994	Salyut Belgorod	53	(0)
1995–1997	Lokomotiv-d Moscow	88	(0)
1998	→ Neftekhimik Nizhnekamsk (loan)	33	(0)
1999	Lokomotiv Moscow	1	(0)
1999–2000	Lokomotiv-2 Moscow	43	(0)
2001–2004	Krylia Sovetov Samara	65	(0)
2005–2009	Lokomotiv Moscow	27	(0)
2008	→ Luch-Energiya Vladivostok (loan)	6	(0)
2009–2010	Tom Tomsk	9	(0)
2011–2012	Lokomotiv-2 Moscow	30	(0)

International career
2001–2005	Uzbekistan	18	(0)

Managerial career
- 2012–2013: FC Lokomotiv-2 Moscow (GK coach)
- 2016–2017: FC Lokomotiv Moscow (U21 GK coach)
- 2017–2019: FC Lokomotiv-Kazanka Moscow (GK coach)
- 2020–2021: FC Torpedo Moscow (GK coach)
- 2021–2023: FC Lokomotiv Moscow (U21 GK coach)
- 2023–: Academy FC Lokomotiv Moscow (GK coach)
- * Club domestic league appearances and goals

Aleksey Nikolayevich Polyakov (Russian: Алексей Николаевич Поляков; born 28 February 1974) is a former football goalkeeper and a goalkeeping coach, currently working with Lokomotiv Moscow's youth team.

Born and raised in Russia, he represented Uzbekistan's national team, having accepted the call from Vladimir Salkov along with the two of his club teammates, Vladimir Maminov and Oleg Pashinin.

== Career ==
Polyakov got 18 caps for the Uzbekistan national team between 2001 and 2005 and was first-choice goalkeeper.

== Career statistics ==
As of 29 November 2008

Season	Team	Country	Division	Apps	Goals
1993	FC Salyut Belgorod	Russia		19	0
1994	FC Salyut Belgorod	Russia		34	0
1995	FC Lokomotiv Moscow	Russia	1	0	0
1996	FC Lokomotiv Moscow	Russia	1	0	0
1997	FC Lokomotiv Moscow	Russia	1	0	0
1998	FC Neftekhimik Nizhnekamsk	Russia		33	0
1999	FC Lokomotiv Moscow	Russia	1	1	0
2000	FC Lokomotiv Moscow	Russia	1	0	0
2001	FC Krylia Sovetov Samara	Russia	1	4	0
2002	FC Krylia Sovetov Samara	Russia	1	21	0
2003	FC Krylia Sovetov Samara	Russia	1	11	0
2004	FC Krylia Sovetov Samara	Russia	1	29	0
2005	FC Lokomotiv Moscow	Russia	1	1	0
2006	FC Lokomotiv Moscow	Russia	1	23	0
2007	FC Lokomotiv Moscow	Russia	1	3	0
2008	FC Lokomotiv Moscow	Russia	1	0	0
2008	FC Luch-Energiya Vladivostok	Russia	1	6	0
2009	FC Tom Tomsk	Russia	1	5	0
