= Vital Bulyga =

Belarusian footballer (born 1980)

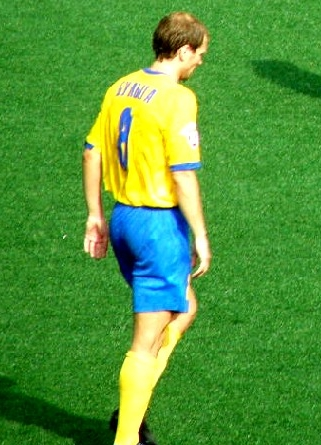
- Bulyga with Luch-Energiya Vladivostok in 2008

Personal information
- Full name: Vitali Nikolaevich Bulyga
- Date of birth: 12 January 1980 (age 46)
- Place of birth: Mogilev, Belarusian SSR, Soviet Union
- Height: 1.75 m (5 ft 9 in)
- Position: Forward

Senior career*
| Years | Team | Apps | (Gls) |
| 1997–2002 | Dnepr-Transmash Mogilev | 88 | (21) |
| 2002–2003 | Krylia Sovetov Samara | 14 | (0) |
| 2003 | Uralan Elista | 11 | (3) |
| 2004 | Amkar Perm | 23 | (2) |
| 2005–2006 | Krylia Sovetov Samara | 51 | (6) |
| 2006–2007 | Tom Tomsk | 35 | (2) |
| 2008 | Luch-Energiya Vladivostok | 30 | (5) |
| 2009 | BATE Borisov | 9 | (1) |
| 2010 | Salyut Belgorod | 25 | (5) |
| 2010 | Shinnik Yaroslavl | 17 | (2) |
| 2011 | Zhemchuzhina-Sochi | 15 | (2) |
| 2011–2012 | Gazovik Orenburg | 25 | (1) |
| 2012 | Belshina Bobruisk | 11 | (4) |
| 2013 | Dnepr Mogilev | 22 | (2) |
| 2015 | Sakhalin Yuzhno-Sakhalinsk | 13 | (2) |
| 2015 | Dinamo Minsk | 9 | (0) |
| 2016 | Belshina Bobruisk | 14 | (6) |
| Total | | 414 | (68) |

International career
| 2000–2001 | Belarus U21 | 13 | (6) |
| 2003–2008 | Belarus | 37 | (8) |

Managerial career
- 2018–2019: Dinamo Minsk (director of sports)
- 2020–2021: Tambov (administrator)
- 2021: Kuban Krasnodar (assistant)
- * Club domestic league appearances and goals

Vital Nikolaevich Bulyga (Belarusian: Віталь Булыга; Russian: Виталий Николаевич Булыга; born 12 January 1980) is a Belarusian football coach and a former player. A forward, he played for the Belarus national team and scored two goals against Germany in a friendly match on 27 May 2008.

== Career statistics ==
Appearances and goals by national team and year
| National team | Year | Apps | Goals |
|---|---|---|---|
| Belarus | 2003 | 2 | 1 |
| Belarus | 2004 | 7 | 3 |
| Belarus | 2005 | 10 | 0 |
| Belarus | 2006 | 4 | 1 |
| Belarus | 2007 | 2 | 1 |
| Belarus | 2008 | 11 | 1 |
| Total | | 36 | 8 |

Scores and results list Belarusia's goal tally first, score column indicates score after each Bulyga goal.

List of international goals scored by Vital Bulyga
| No. | Date | Venue | Opponent | Score | Result | Competition |
|---|---|---|---|---|---|---|
| 1 | 6 September 2003 | Dinamo Stadium, Minsk, Belarus | Czech Republic | 1–0 | 1–3 | Euro 2004 qualifier |
| 2 | 21 February 2004 | GSZ Stadium, Larnaca, Cyprus | Latvia | 1–0 | 4–1 | Cyprus International Football Tournament |
| 3 | 9 October 2004 | Dinamo Stadium, Minsk, Belarus | Moldova | 3–0 | 4–0 | 2006 FIFA World Cup qualification |
| 4 | 13 October 2004 | Stadio Ennio Tardini, Parma, Italy | Italy | 2–3 | 3–4 | 2006 FIFA World Cup qualification |
| 5 | 16 August 2006 | Dinamo Stadium, Minsk, Belarus | Andorra | 2–0 | 3–0 | Friendly |
| 6 | 21 November 2007 | Dinamo Stadium, Minsk, Belarus | Netherlands | 1–0 | 2–1 | Euro 2008 qualifier |
| 7 | 27 May 2008 | Fritz-Walter-Stadion, Kaiserslautern, Germany | Germany | 1–2 | 2–2 | Friendly |
| 8 | 27 May 2008 | Fritz-Walter-Stadion, Kaiserslautern, Germany | Germany | 2–2 | 2–2 | Friendly |

== Honours ==
BATE Borisov

- Belarusian Premier League: 2009
