= Anatoli Kisurin =

Russian footballer

Personal information
- Full name: Anatoli Yevgenyevich Kisurin
- Date of birth: 23 December 1969
- Date of death: 15 April 2014 (aged 44)
- Height: 1.77 m (5 ft 9 1/2 in)
- Positions: Forward; midfielder

Senior career*
Years	Team	Apps	(Gls)
1987	FC Irtysh Omsk	1	(0)
1990	FC Kauchuk Sterlitamak	26	(2)
1990–1992	FC Irtysh Omsk	25	(0)
1993–2000	FC Dynamo Omsk	193	(90)
2001	FC Irtysh Omsk	14	(0)
2002	FC Luch Vladivostok	27	(10)
2003	FC Chkalovets-Olimpik Novosibirsk	17	(2)
2004	FC Amur Blagoveshchensk	5	(0)
- * Club domestic league appearances and goals

Anatoli Yevgenyevich Kisurin (Russian: Анатолий Евгеньевич Кисурин; 23 December 1969 – 15 April 2014) was a Russian professional football player.

== Club career ==
He played in the Russian Football National League for FC Irtysh Omsk in 1992.

== Honours ==
- Russian Second Division Zone Siberia top scorer: 1994 (18 goals).
