= Igor Kralevski =

Macedonian footballer

Personal information
- Full name: Igor Kralevski; Игор Кралевски
- Date of birth: 10 November 1978 (age 47)
- Place of birth: Skopje, SR Macedonia, SFR Yugoslavia
- Height: 1.87 m (6 ft 1 1/2 in)
- Position: Defender

Youth career
- Cementarnica 55

Senior career*
Years	Team	Apps	(Gls)
1998–2001	Cementarnica 55	6	(1)
2001–2002	Makedonija	14	(2)
2002–2005	Rabotnički Kometal	87	(4)
2005–2007	Hajduk Split	12	(0)
2007–2008	Luch-Energiya	20	(0)
2009–2010	Makedonija	14	(1)
2010–2012	Metalurg Skopje	66	(7)
2012–2014	Teteks	28	(0)

International career
2005–2010	Macedonia	3	(0)
- * Club domestic league appearances and goals

Igor Kralevski (Macedonian: Игор Кралевски; born 10 November 1978) is a Macedonian former footballer who played as a defender.

== International career ==
He made his senior debut for Macedonia in a June 2005 FIFA World Cup qualification match away against Armenia and has earned a total of 3 caps, scoring no goals. His final international was a December 2010 friendly match against China.
