= Yevgeni Kuznetsov (footballer, born 2000) =

Russian footballer

Personal information
- Full name: Yevgeni Igorevich Kuznetsov
- Date of birth: 2 June 2000 (age 26)
- Place of birth: Barnaul, Russia
- Height: 1.83 m (6 ft 0 in)
- Position: Midfielder

Senior career*
Years	Team	Apps	(Gls)
2017–2020	FC Dynamo Barnaul	30	(2)
2020–2022	FC Irtysh Omsk	15	(1)
2021	→ FC Chita (loan)	12	(0)
2022–2024	FC Dynamo Barnaul	56	(3)
- * Club domestic league appearances and goals as of 19 October 2024

Yevgeni Igorevich Kuznetsov (Russian: Евгений Игоревич Кузнецов; born 2 June 2000) is a Russian football player.

== Club career ==
He made his debut in the Russian Football National League for FC Irtysh Omsk on 1 August 2020 in a game against FC Yenisey Krasnoyarsk, he substituted Vadim Zubavlenko in the 55th minute.
