= Maksim Kulyomin =

Russian footballer

Personal information
- Full name: Maksim Aleksandrovich Kulyomin
- Date of birth: 25 May 1989 (age 37)
- Place of birth: Ussuriysk, Russian SFSR
- Height: 1.84 m (6 ft 0 in)
- Position: Defender

Senior career*
Years	Team	Apps	(Gls)
2006	FC Lokomotiv Moscow	0	(0)
2007–2010	FC Luch-Energiya Vladivostok	4	(0)
2009	→ FC Sakhalin Yuzhno-Sakhalinsk (loan)	6	(0)
2010	→ FC Mostovik-Primorye Ussuriysk (loan)	25	(0)
2011–2012	FC Smena Komsomolsk-na-Amure	22	(0)
2012	FC Yakutiya Yakutsk	2	(0)
- * Club domestic league appearances and goals

Maksim Aleksandrovich Kulyomin (Russian: Максим Александрович Кулёмин, born 25 May 1989) is a Russian former footballer.

== Club career ==
He made his debut in the Russian Premier League for Luch-Energiya on 16 November 2008 in a game against FC Spartak Moscow.
