= Yevgeni Kuznetsov (footballer, born 1983) =

Russian footballer

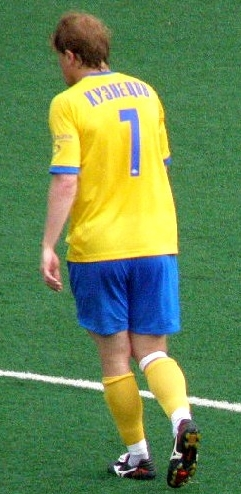
- Kuznetsov with FC Luch-Energiya Vladivostok in 2008

Personal information
- Full name: Yevgeni Nikolayevich Kuznetsov
- Date of birth: 2 December 1983 (age 42)
- Place of birth: Gorky, Russian SFSR, Soviet Union
- Height: 1.79 m (5 ft 10 in)
- Position: Midfielder

Youth career
- Sormovich Nizhny Novgorod

Senior career*
Years	Team	Apps	(Gls)
2001–2002	FC Elektronika Nizhny Novgorod	28	(10)
2003–2004	FC Dynamo Moscow	0	(0)
2003	→ FC Chernomorets Novorossiysk (loan)	2	(0)
2004–2008	FC Luch-Energiya Vladivostok	69	(1)
2009	FC Shinnik Yaroslavl	31	(3)
2010	FC Volga Nizhny Novgorod	10	(0)
2010–2011	FC Baltika Kaliningrad	43	(0)
2012–2013	FC Khimki	32	(1)
2013	FC Fakel Voronezh	8	(0)
2014	FC Zenit Penza	2	(0)
2015–2017	FC Zenit Penza	27	(2)
- * Club domestic league appearances and goals

Yevgeni Nikolayevich Kuznetsov (Russian: Евгений Николаевич Кузнецов; born 2 December 1983) is a Russian former footballer.
