= Marek Čech (Czech footballer) =

Czech footballer (born 1976)

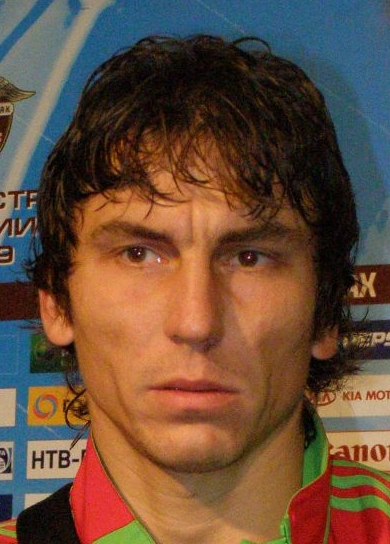
- Čech with Lokomotiv Moscow in 2009

Personal information
- Date of birth: 8 April 1976 (age 50)
- Place of birth: Ostrava, Czechoslovakia
- Height: 1.87 m (6 ft 2 in)
- Position: Goalkeeper

Youth career
- 1984–1990: Slavia Orlová
- 1990–1996: Baník Ostrava

Senior career*
Years	Team	Apps	(Gls)
1996	VTJ Hranice	0	(0)
1997–2001	Baník Ostrava	0	(0)
1998	→ Frýdek-Místek (loan)	3	(0)
1999–2000	→ NH Ostrava (loan)	32	(0)
2000	→ Fotbal Třinec (loan)	14	(0)
2001–2003	Žilina	15	(0)
2003	→ Fotbal Třinec (loan)	0	(0)
2003–2004	Spartak Trnava	36	(0)
2004–2007	Slovan Liberec	58	(0)
2007–2008	Luch-Energiya Vladivostok	43	(0)
2008–2010	Lokomotiv Moscow	24	(0)
2011	Zhemchuzhina-Sochi	19	(0)
2011–2012	Viktoria Plzeň	15	(0)
2012–2014	Sparta Prague	0	(0)
2014	Delhi Dynamos	0	(0)
Total		259	(0)

International career
2006	Czech Republic	1	(0)
- * Club domestic league appearances and goals

Marek Čech (born 8 April 1976) is a Czech former professional footballer who played as a goalkeeper.

== Career ==
Čech started playing football at age 8 for Slavia Orlová, whose first team was then in 4th division. In 1990, he moved to Baník Ostrava, where he did not manage to get a place in the senior team, even though he did sign a contract when he turned 18. Two years later, he had to do his military service and spent this year playing for VTJ Hranice.

When he came back, he was loaned to second-division teams Frýdek-Místek, NH Ostrava and Fotbal Třinec. In Frýdek-Místek he only got to play three games, only in Ostrava did he become a regular. In early 2001, he was surprisingly sold to Slovak club MŠK Žilina but there he was only the number two. At the start of the 2003/04 season, he was briefly loaned to former club Třinec, then sold to Spartak Trnava. There he had no real concurrence and put up good performances, which drew the attention of Slovan Liberec that purchased him in 2004. He was first considered a substitute (behind Zbyněk Hauzr), but quickly became number one and even one of the best goalkeepers in the Czech league, spending 740 minutes without conceding a goal in 2006.

On 15 November 2006, he made his debut for the Czech national team in a friendly against Denmark that ended up in a 1–1 draw. This was, however, to remain his only cap as he was never able to be more than the number 3 goalkeeper, behind Petr Čech and Jaromír Blažek.

On 5 January 2007, he agreed on a contract that linked him for two years with Russian club Luch-Energia Vladivostok. The fee was undisclosed but is believed to have been around 12 million koruna ($600,000). In August 2008, he was sold to Lokomotiv Moscow.

In August 2014, Čech was signed by Delhi Dynamos in the newly formed Indian Super League.

== Honours ==
MŠK Žilina

- Corgoň Liga: 2001–02

Slovan Liberec

- Gambrinus liga: 2005–06
