= Aleksandr Yashan =

Russian footballer

Personal information
- Full name: Aleksandr Vladimirovich Yashan
- Date of birth: 22 April 1990 (age 36)
- Place of birth: Blagoveshchensk, Russian SFSR
- Height: 1.77 m (5 ft 10 in)
- Position: Midfielder

Senior career*
Years	Team	Apps	(Gls)
2007–2009	FC Luch-Energiya Vladivostok	2	(0)
2009	→ FC Okean Nakhodka (loan)	5	(2)
2010	FC Luch-Energiya-M Vladivostok		
2011–2014	FC Amur-2010 Blagoveshchensk	62	(10)
2014–2016	FC Smena Komsomolsk-na-Amure	43	(11)
2016–2017	FC Chita	18	(1)
2018	FC Blagoveshchensk		
- * Club domestic league appearances and goals

Aleksandr Vladimirovich Yashan (Russian: Александр Владимирович Яшан; born 22 April 1990) is a Russian former professional football player.

== Club career ==
He made his Russian Football National League debut for FC Luch-Energiya Vladivostok on 14 May 2009 in a game against FC Nizhny Novgorod. That was his only season in the FNL so far.
