= Aleksandr Tikhonovetsky =

Russian footballer (born 1979)

Personal information
- Full name: Aleksandr Viktorovich Tikhonovetsky
- Date of birth: 11 April 1979 (age 47)
- Place of birth: Nakhodka, Primorsky Krai, Russian SFSR, Soviet Union
- Height: 1.85 m (6 ft 1 in)
- Position: Striker

Team information
- Current team: FC Luch-Energiya Vladivostok (assistant manager)

Senior career*
Years	Team	Apps	(Gls)
1997–1999	FC Okean Nakhodka	73	(7)
2000	FC Luch Vladivostok	21	(9)
2001	PFC CSKA Moscow	1	(0)
2001	FC Luch-Energiya Vladivostok	24	(11)
2002–2003	FC Chernomorets Novorossiysk	47	(4)
2004–2008	FC Luch-Energiya Vladivostok	121	(28)
2008–2009	FC Kuban Krasnodar	21	(8)
2009	FC Luch-Energiya Vladivostok	13	(3)
2010	FC Nizhny Novgorod	22	(13)
2010	→ FC Alania Vladikavkaz (loan)	6	(0)
2011–2013	FC Luch-Energiya Vladivostok	48	(15)

Managerial career
- 2013–2014: FC Luch-Energiya Vladivostok (administrator)
- 2014–2018: FC Luch-Energiya Vladivostok (assistant)
- 2018–2019: FC Luch-Energiya Vladivostok
- 2019–: FC Okean Nakhodka
- * Club domestic league appearances and goals

Aleksandr Viktorovich Tikhonovetsky (Russian: Александр Викторович Тихоновецкий; born 11 April 1979) is a Russian football coach and a former player. He is an assistant coach with FC Luch-Energiya Vladivostok.

== Career ==
Tikhonovetsky made his debut in the Russian Premier League in 2001 with PFC CSKA Moscow.

He is a nephew of former FC Okean Nakhodka and FC Lokomotiv Moscow player Oleg Garin (who is considered the most well known Okean player ever) and until 2004 was known as Aleksandr Garin (Russian: Александр Гарин). After his uncle Oleg mentioned in his autobiography that he thinks Aleksandr's last name has helped him in his football career, Tikhonovetsky changed it, taking his wife's last name.

In 2006, he was disqualified for 8 months for testing positive for marijuana.
