= Kirill Pavlyuchek =

Belarusian footballer

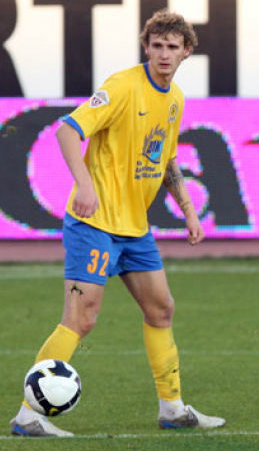

Personal information
- Date of birth: 27 June 1984 (age 42)
- Place of birth: Grodno, Belarusian SSR, Soviet Union
- Height: 1.91 m (6 ft 3 in)
- Position: Defender

Youth career
- 2001–2003: Dinamo Minsk

Senior career*
Years	Team	Apps	(Gls)
2001	Dinamo-2 Minsk	10	(1)
2003–2008	Dinamo Minsk	111	(9)
2008	Luch-Energiya Vladivostok	10	(0)
2009	Neman Grodno	6	(0)
2010	Gomel	27	(9)
2011–2012	Minsk	23	(3)
2012–2013	Dnepr Mogilev	37	(1)
2014	Zimbru Chișinău	23	(2)
2015–2020	Gorodeya	144	(10)
2020–2021	Slavia Mozyr	8	(1)
2021	Smorgon	5	(0)
2022	Krumkachy Minsk	17	(2)
2023	Traktor Minsk	15	(2)

International career
2005–2006	Belarus U21	8	(4)
2008	Belarus	3	(0)
- * Club domestic league appearances and goals as of 20 November 2023

Kirill Pavlyuchek (Belarusian: Кирыл Паўлючак, romanized: Kiryl Pawlyuchak; Russian: Кирилл Павлючек; born 27 June 1984) is a Belarusian former professional footballer.

== Career ==
Pavlyuchek has been called one of the most promising defenders in Belarusian football, and made his debut with the Belarus national football team during 2008 at the Malta International Tournament.

== Honours ==
Dinamo Minsk

- Belarusian Premier League champion: 2004
- Belarusian Cup winner: 2002–03

Gomel

- Belarusian Cup winner: 2010–11

Minsk

- Belarusian Cup winner: 2012–13

Zimbru Chișinău

- Moldovan Cup winner: 2013–14
- Moldovan Super Cup winner: 2014

== Career stats ==
Season	Club	Country	Level	Apps	Goals
2008	FC Luch-Energiya Vladivostok	Russia	I	10	0
2008	FC Dinamo Minsk	Belarus	I	13	2
2007	FC Dinamo Minsk	Belarus	I	17	0
2006	FC Dinamo Minsk	Belarus	I	26	0
2005	FC Dinamo Minsk	Belarus	I	18	2
2004	FC Dinamo Minsk	Belarus	I	19	2
2003	FC Dinamo Minsk	Belarus	I	18	3
