= Dmitry A. Smirnov =

Russian footballer

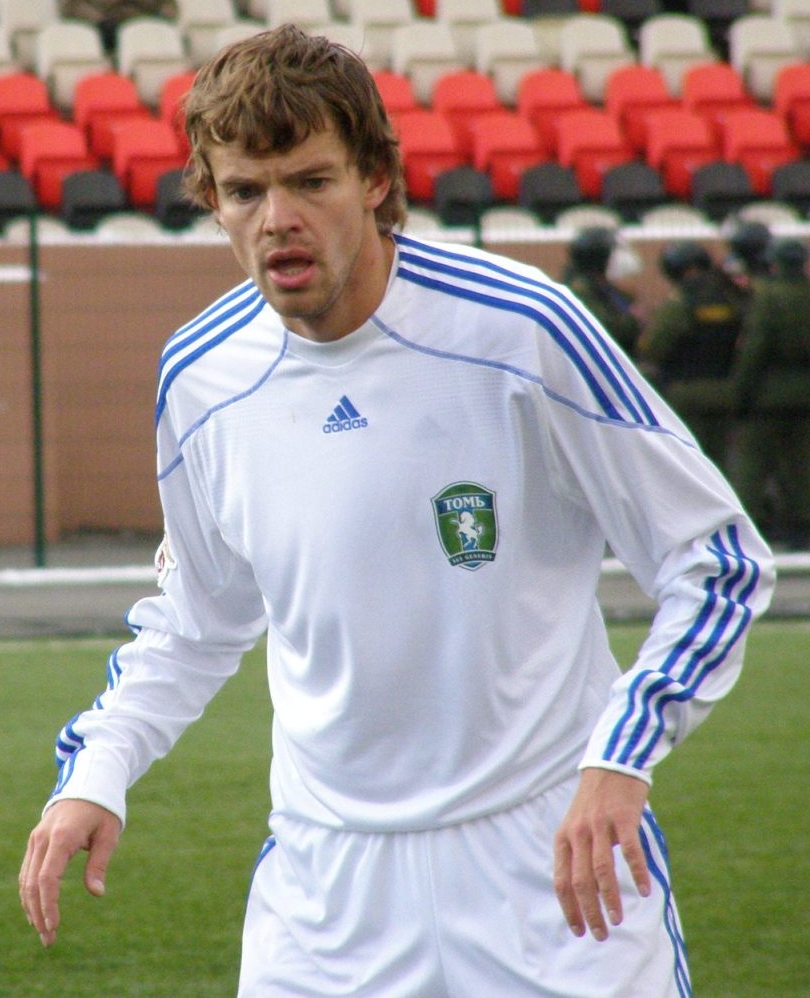

Personal information
- Full name: Dmitry Alexandrovich Smirnov
- Date of birth: 13 August 1980 (age 46)
- Place of birth: Moscow, Russian SFSR
- Height: 1.95 m (6 ft 5 in)
- Position: Midfielder

Team information
- Current team: Ural Yekaterinburg (assistant coach)

Youth career
- 1987–1998: Torpedo Moscow

Senior career*
Years	Team	Apps	(Gls)
1998–2002	Torpedo-ZIL Moscow	27	(7)
2003	Spartak Moscow	17	(2)
2003	Chernomorets Novorossiysk	11	(2)
2004	Alania Vladikavkaz	20	(2)
2005–2008	Luch-Energiya Vladivostok	95	(25)
2009–2011	Terek Grozny	10	(0)
2009	→ Tom Tomsk (loan)	8	(0)
2010	→ Luch-Energiya Vladivostok (loan)	9	(1)
2011	Mordovia Saransk	3	(1)
2011–2012	Volyn Lutsk	2	(0)
2012–2015	Arsenal Tula	41	(6)
2015	Arsenal-2 Tula	10	(1)
2016	Arsenal Tula	10	(0)

Managerial career
- 2019–2023: Strogino Moscow (academy)
- 2024: Rodina Moscow (assist.)
- 2024–2025: Sabah (assist.)
- 2025: 2DROTS Moscow
- 2026–: Ural Yekaterinburg (assist.)
- * Club domestic league appearances and goals

Dmitry Alexandrovich Smirnov (Russian: Дмитрий Александрович Смирнов; born 13 August 1980) is a Russian football coach and a former player. He is an assistant coach for Ural Yekaterinburg.

== Career ==
He holds the record for Luch for most league goals in a year (19 goals in 2005) and left on 7 January 2009 the club and moved to FC Terek Grozny.

=== Coaching ===
On November 27, 2024, it was announced that he had been appointed as an assistant coach at Sabah.

== Personal ==
His father, Aleksandr Smirnov, played in the Soviet Top League for FC Spartak Moscow.

== Characteristics ==
He is not related to Dmitri Nikolayevich Smirnov with whom he played on the same team for several years for FC Torpedo-ZIL Moscow, Luch and Tom. To avoid confusion, he is usually referred to as Dmitri A. Smirnov or Smirnov I.
