= Dragan Stojkić =

Bosnian footballer

Personal information
- Full name: Dragan Stojkić
- Date of birth: October 7, 1975 (age 51)
- Place of birth: Split, Yugoslavia (now Croatia)
- Height: 1.85 m (6 ft 1 in)
- Position: Goalkeeper

Senior career*
Years	Team	Apps	(Gls)
1995–1997	Hajduk Split	1	(0)
1997–1998	Samobor	18	(0)
1998–2000	Slaven Belupo	27	(0)
2000	Široki Brijeg	0	(0)
2000	Hajduk Split	1	(0)
2001	NK Zagreb	9	(0)
2001–2002	Marsonia	21	(0)
2002–2003	Šibenik	15	(0)
2003–2008	NK Zagreb	138	(0)
2008	Luch-Energiya	6	(0)
2009–2011	Ashdod	54	(0)
2011–2012	Hapoel Ashkelon	32	(0)
2013	Zmaj Makarska	1	(0)
2013-2014	Croatia Zmijavci		

International career
2002	Bosnia and Herzegovina	1	(0)
- * Club domestic league appearances and goals as of 19 May 2010

Dragan Stojkić (born October 7, 1975, in Split, Yugoslavia) is a Bosnian-Herzegovinian retired football goalkeeper.

He is considered the best goalkeeper in the Israeli league alongside Hapoel Tel Aviv's Vincent Enyeama. He is best known for his remarkable reflexes and his 1 on 1 abilities. In a local interview Stojkić revealed that he had some offers from the English premier league as he declined them all due to his loyalty to his former club NK Zagreb as he was the club's captain, he also mentioned his intentions of continuing to coach goalies for F.C. Ashdod's youth's department once he retires.

== International career ==
He made one appearance for Bosnia and Herzegovina, coming on as a half time substitute for Tomislav Piplica in a March 2002 friendly match against Macedonia.
