= Igor Yushchenko =

Russian footballer and coach

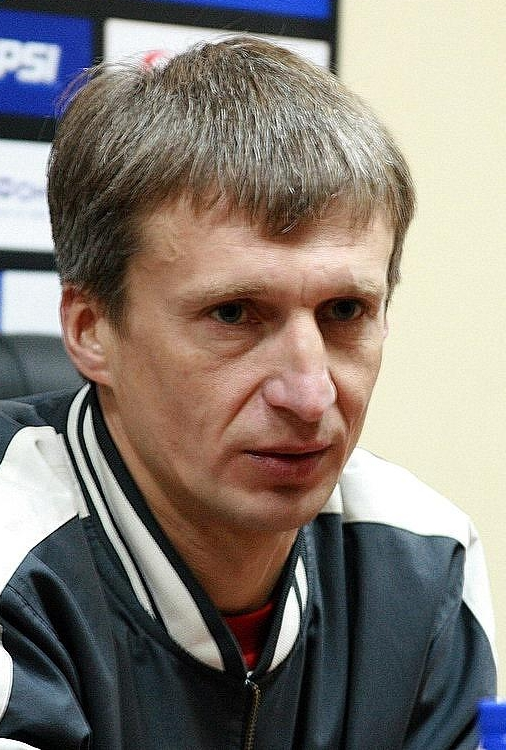
- Igor Yushchenko in 2008

Personal information
- Full name: Igor Nikolayevich Yushchenko
- Date of birth: 9 March 1969 (age 57)
- Place of birth: Khimki, Russian SFSR
- Height: 1.80 m (5 ft 11 in)
- Position: Midfielder

Senior career*
Years	Team	Apps	(Gls)
1986–1987	FC Dynamo Moscow	0	(0)
1988–1989	FC Dynamo-2 Moscow	45	(9)
1988–1990	FC Lokomotiv Moscow	13	(0)
1991–1992	FC Lokomotiv Nizhny Novgorod	34	(4)
1992–1993	FC Chernomorets Novorossiysk	21	(3)
1996–2001	FC Khimki	89	(14)

Managerial career
- 2001: FC Khimki (assistant)
- 2003: FC Khimki (assistant)
- 2006–2008: FC Khimki (assistant)
- 2007: FC Khimki (caretaker)
- 2008: FC Khimki (caretaker)
- 2009: FC Lokomotiv Astana (assistant)
- 2011–2012: Simurq PIK (assistant)
- 2012–2013: FC Sibir Novosibirsk (assistant)
- 2014–2015: FC Baltika Kaliningrad (assistant)
- 2017–2020: FC Zorky Krasnogorsk (assistant)
- 2020–2021: FC Khimki (analyst)
- 2021: FC Khimki (caretaker)
- 2022: FC Khimki-M
- 2022–2023: FC Zorkiy Krasnogorsk
- * Club domestic league appearances and goals

Igor Nikolayevich Yushchenko (Russian: Игорь Николаевич Ющенко; born 9 March 1969) is a Russian professional football coach and a former player.

== Coaching career ==
On 25 October 2021, he was appointed as caretaker manager by Russian Premier League club FC Khimki. His caretaking spell ended on 19 November 2021.
