= Dynamo Stadium (Vladivostok) =

Multi-purpose stadium in Vladivostok, Russia

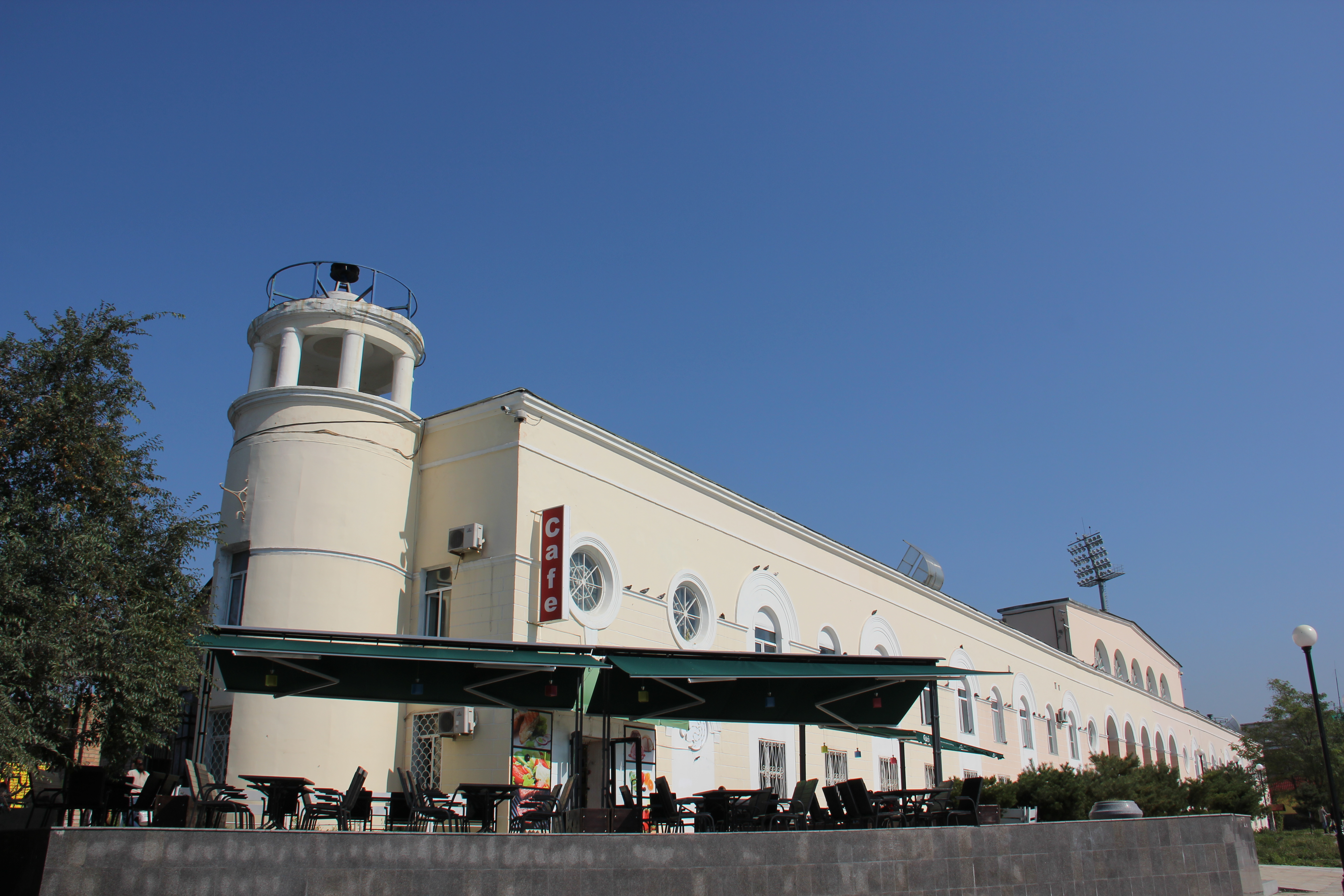
- Dynamo Stadium
- Interactive map of Dynamo Stadium
- Location: 1, Ulitsa Admirala Fokina, Vladivostok
- Coordinates: 43°07′09″N 131°52′44″E
- Capacity: 10,200
- Field size: 105 × 67.4 m

Construction
- Opened: 1957
- Renovated: 2003

Tenant
- Dynamo Vladivostok

The Dynamo Stadium is a multi-purpose stadium in Vladivostok, Russia. It is used mostly for football matches and is the home ground of FC Dynamo Vladivostok. The stadium is situated near the main square and harbour and by one of the beaches of Vladivostok. The pitch has been improved and has had floodlights installed as well. The stadium holds a capacity of 10,200 people.

== See also ==
- List of football stadiums in Russia
- Lists of stadiums
