= FC Luch Vladivostok =

Russian football club

FC Luch
- Full name: Football Club; Luch Vladivostok
- Nickname: Tigri (Tigers)
- Founded: 1958; 68 years ago
- Dissolved: 2020; 6 years ago
- Ground: Dynamo Stadium, Vladivostok
- Capacity: 10,200
- Chairman: Yevgeni Strizhichenko
- Manager: Vacant
- 2019–20: FNL, 16th (relegated)
Home colours	Away colours

FC Luch Vladivostok (Russian: Футбольный клуб "Луч" Владивосток) was an association football club based in Vladivostok. In 2005, Luch won the Russian First Division and played in the Premier League from 2006 to 2008.

The club was called Luch-Energiya from 2003 to 2018, when it was renamed due to sponsorship from Dalenergo, an energy distribution company.

== History ==
Luch has been playing in the Soviet Union championship since 1958. The name Luch means Ray. The club played in the Far East regional tournament of "B-class" teams and eventually won it in 1965, earning promotion to "A-class". Luch played in this regional tournament until league reorganization in 1972.

From 1972 to 1991, Luch played in the Eastern zone of Soviet Second League. The club's best result was a runner-up position in 1984.

In 1992, after the dissolution of Soviet Union, Luch was entitled to play in the Eastern zone of Russian First League and won that tournament. Luch played in Russian Top League in 1993 and was relegated, having finished 15th.

Luch played in Russian First Division from 1994 until relegation in 1997, and in Russian Second Division from 1998 to 2003. In 2003, Luch-Energia finished 1st in the Eastern zone and earned promotion. The club spent another 2 years in First Division, earning promotion to Premier League in 2005. In 2008 Luch finished in the last position and was relegated to the Russian First Division. The club had some financial problems and were forced to sell some of their key players making the club vulnerable at home, formerly considered a fortress on the remote Pacific coast.

Luch-Energia logo

In November 2017, Luch's home game against Khimki was delayed by 15 minutes due to a protest by the club's players over delays in wages and the running of the club. Due to four months without pay some of the players had been evicted from their accommodation and a Luch supporters group supplying food to the players.

Despite finishing in the relegation zone at the end of the 2017–18 season, the club was not relegated as other clubs ahead in the standings failed to obtain the league license for 2018–19.

On 16 July 2018, the club was renamed back to FC Luch.

On 1 April 2020, the government of Primorsky Krai announced that all professional contracts with sports clubs in their region had been cancelled to provide funds to combat the spread the COVID-19 pandemic, with Luch Vladivostok dropping to the Russian Amateur Football League once football returns.

=== Domestic ===
Season	Div.	Pos.	Pl.	W	D	L	GS	GA	P	Cup	Europe	Top scorer (League)	Head Coach
1992	2nd, "East"	1	30	20	4	6	44	14	23	—	—	(Russia) Kasyanenko – 9 (Russia) Dubovik – 9	(Russia) Burchalkin (Russia) Ivchenko
1993	1st	15	34	11	7	16	29	56	29	R256	—	(Russia) Ruslyakov – 7	(Russia) Ivchenko
1993	Releg. tourn.	4	5	2	2	1	11	9	6	R256	—	(Russia) (Tajikistan) Galimov – 4	(Russia) Ivchenko
1994	2nd	12	42	15	11	16	44	53	41	—	—	(Russia) I. Protasov – 9	(Russia) Ig. Saenko
1995	2nd	6	42	20	6	16	51	48	66	R256	—	(Russia) Selenkov – 16	(Russia) Burchalkin
1996	2nd	15	42	14	12	16	39	49	54	R128	—	(Russia) Shkilov – 9	(Russia) Szekecs
1997	2nd	22	42	3	12	27	23	76	21	—	—	(Russia) Selenkov – 5	(Russia) Kobersky
1998	3rd, "East"	7	30	14	6	10	42	24	48	R64	—	(Russia) Melnik – 8	(Russia) Fedyakin
1999	3rd, "East"	7	30	14	7	9	43	32	49	R128	—	(Russia) Melnik – 11	(Russia) Fedyakin
2000	3rd, "East"	4	24	12	3	9	41	26	39	R512	—	(Russia) Tikhonovetsky – 9	(Russia) Karamyan (Russia) Zhuravlyov
2001	3rd, "East"	8	28	9	10	9	31	29	37	R128	—	(Russia) Tikhonovetsky – 8	(Russia) Lukyanov
2002	3rd, "East"	6	30	15	6	9	51	34	51	R512	—	(Russia) Kisurin – 10	(Russia) Tolkin (Russia) Zhuravlyov
2003	3rd, "East"	1	24	16	4	4	53	23	52	R512	—	(Russia) A. Smirnov – 11	(Russia) Zhuravlyov (Russia) Antikhovich
2004	2nd	14	42	15	11	16	50	50	56	R128	—	(Russia) Sokolov – 11 (Cameroon) Atangana – 11	(Russia) Antikhovich (Russia) Pavlov
2005	2nd	1	42	27	11	4	81	32	92	R64	—	(Russia) D.A. Smirnov – 19	(Russia) Pavlov
2006	1st	7	30	12	5	13	37	39	41	R16	—	(Russia) A. Ivanov – 5	(Russia) Pavlov
2007	1st	14	30	8	8	14	26	38	32	R32	—	(Russia) Strelkov – 5	(Russia) Pavlov
2008	1st	16	30	3	12	15	24	53	21	R32	—	(Belarus) Bulyga – 5 (Russia) I. Shevchenko – 5	(Croatia) Vulić (Russia) Altman
2009	2nd	14	38	13	11	14	42	43	50	R32	—	(Ukraine) Dedechko – 9	(Russia) Yemelyanov (Russia) Pobegalov
2010	2nd	12	38	13	13	12	42	42	52	QF	—	(Russia) Satalkin – 9	(Russia) Nazarenko (Spain) Arcos
2011–12	2nd	17	48	11	21	16	37	39	54	R16	—	(Russia) Alkhazov – 10	(Spain) Arcos (Russia) Pavlov
2012–13	3rd, "East"	1	30	18	8	4	48	27	62	R2	—	(Russia) Tikhonovetsky – 14	(Russia) Yemelyanov
2013–14	2nd	8	36	15	10	11	40	25	55	SF	—	(Russia) Asildarov – 5 (Ukraine) Mikhalyov −5	(Russia) Yemelyanov (Russia) Grigoryan
2014–15	2nd	10	34	11	9	14	40	46	42	R32	—	(Russia) Myazin −11	(Russia) Grigoryan (Russia) Ushahin
2015–16	2nd	15	38	12	9	17	31	46	45	R4	—	(Brazil) Nivaldo −6	(Russia) Veretennikov (Russia) Perednya
2016–17	2nd	16	38	9	15	14	27	41	42	R4	—	(Russia) Stolbovoy −5	(Russia) Perednya
2017–18	2nd	18	38	9	13	16	40	52	40	QF	—	(Russia) Geloyan −7 (Russia) Myazin −7	(Lithuania) Ivanauskas (Russia) Grigoryan
2018–19	2nd	13	38	10	17	11	29	28	47	R64	—	(Russia) Pavlenko −4 (Russia) Khleborodov −4 (Russia) Viznovich −4	(Russia) Khuzin
2019–20	2nd	16	27	6	9	12	28	40	27	R16	—	(Russia) Aliyev −8	(Russia) Khuzin (Russia) Ushakhin (Caretaker) (Russia) Petrakov

== Complications ==
Situated in the Far East of the country, their location poses a significant problem for away teams, for example being 9 hours by flight from Moscow. When playing FC Zenit Saint Petersburg at home, a trio of Zenit fans drove 15,000 km across the country only for their car to break down when in Vladivostok, leaving them unable to drive home. These fans thus took the Trans-Siberian Railway back to Saint Petersburg, upon which the club rewarded them with a new car on 1 October 2006.

There has been much controversy about whether the Russian league should be split into Western and Eastern leagues; however, this is yet to happen. Igor Akinfeev said "They should join football league in Japan." after CSKA Moscow lost 0–4 away from home against Vladivostok on 10 June 2007. In addition to this, even their own players admitted it was awkward as they had to travel long distances for away games. Matija Kristić said "It's not as bad for other teams because they only need to travel this distance once a year whereas we have to do it for all away matches". Srđan Radonjić said "It is just crazy, they should have two Russian premier leagues, one for the European teams and another for Asian teams. Vladivostok is 4,000 miles from Moscow."

== Notable players ==
Had international caps for their respective countries. Players whose name is listed in bold represented their countries while playing for Luch-Energiya.

USSR/Russia

- (Soviet Union) Nikolai Gontar
- (Russia) Andrei Chichkin
- (Russia) Anatoli Kanishchev
- (Russia) Andrei Kondrashov
- (Russia) Alan Kusov
- (Russia) Artyom Makarchuk
- (Russia) Ramiz Mamedov
- (Russia) Aleksei Rebko
- (Russia) Aleksandr Sheshukov

Former USSR countries

- (Armenia) Manuk Kakosyan
- (Armenia) **Ruslan Koryan**
- (Armenia) Andrey Movsisyan
- (Belarus) **Vital Bulyha**
- (Belarus) Andrei Kovalenko
- (Belarus) Konstantin Kovalenko
- (Belarus) Vitali Lanko
- (Belarus) **Kirill Pavlyuchek**
- (Belarus) **Sergei Shtanyuk**
- (Belarus) **Gennady Tumilovich**
- (Georgia (country)) **Giorgi Lomaia**
- (Turkmenistan) Wýaçeslaw Krendelew
- (Ukraine) Denys Dedechko
- (Uzbekistan) Andrey Akopyants
- (Uzbekistan) Aleksei Poliakov

Europe

- (Bosnia and Herzegovina) **Dario Damjanović**
- (Bosnia and Herzegovina) **Josip Lukačević**
- (Bosnia and Herzegovina) Dragan Stojkić
- (Czech Republic) Marek Čech
- (Estonia) **Vladimir Voskoboinikov**
- (Latvia) **Jurģis Pučinskis**
- (Latvia) Mihails Ziziļevs
- (North Macedonia) Igor Kralevski
- (Montenegro) Srđan Radonjić
- (Montenegro) Vladimir Vujović

Africa

- (Namibia) George Hummel
