= 2006 FC Luch-Energiya Vladivostok season =

Luch-Energiya Vladivostok
2006 season
- Manager: Sergei Pavlov
- Stadium: Dynamo Stadium
- Premier League: 7th
- Russian Cup: Round of 16 vs Spartak Moscow
- Russian Cup: Round of 32 vs Dynamo Makhachkala
- Top goalscorer: League: Aleksei Ivanov & Dmitry A. Smirnov (5); All: Aleksei Ivanov; Dmitry A. Smirnov (5)

The 2006 Luch-Energiya Vladivostok season was the club's 2nd season in the Russian Premier League, and their first since 1993. Luch-Energiya Vladivostok finished the season in 7th, reached the Round of 16 in the 2005–06 Russian Cup, and in the 2006–07 Russian Cup they were knocked out at the Round of 32 stage by Dynamo Makhachkala.

== Squad ==
As of match played 26 November 2006

No.	Name	Nationality	Position	Date of birth (age)	Signed from	Signed in	Contract ends	Apps.	Goals
Goalkeepers
1	Roman Gerus	(Russia)	GK	14 September 1980 (aged 26)	Chernomorets Novorossiysk	2004			
42	Giorgi Lomaia	(Georgia (country))	GK	8 August 1979 (aged 27)	Khimki	2006		9	0
50	Gennady Tumilovich	(Belarus)	GK	3 September 1971 (aged 35)	Royal Antwerp	2004			
Defenders
2	Konstantin Lobov	(Russia)	DF	2 May 1981 (aged 25)	Zenit St.Petersburg	2004			
4	Dmitri Davydov	(Russia)	DF	11 January 1975 (aged 31)	Metallurg Lipetsk	2005			
5	Aleksandr Cherkes	(Russia)	DF	2 September 1976 (aged 30)	Sokol Saratov	2005			
25	Roman Romanov	(Russia)	DF	5 February 1981 (aged 25)	Zenit-2 St.Petersburg	2006		3	0
30	Dmitri N. Smirnov	(Russia)	DF	9 November 1980 (aged 26)	Khimki	2006		20	0
33	Syarhey Shtanyuk	(Belarus)	DF	13 August 1973 (aged 33)	Metalurh Zaporizhya	2006		19	1
35	Dmytro Semochko	(Ukraine)	DF	25 January 1979 (aged 27)	Dnipro Dnipropetrovsk	2006		27	1
51	Pavel Hannesen	(Russia)	DF	19 February 1986 (aged 20)	Youth Team	2005			
57	Aleksandr Neproikin	(Russia)	DF	21 May 1986 (aged 20)	Youth Team	2005			
59	Dmitri Kabanov	(Russia)	DF	12 December 1985 (aged 20)	Youth Team	2005			
Midfielders
6	Sergey Kuznetsov	(Russia)	MF	7 May 1986 (aged 20)	loan from Lokomotiv Moscow	2006		3	0
7	Yevgeni Kuznetsov	(Russia)	MF	2 December 1983 (aged 22)	Dynamo Moscow	2004			
8	Aleksei Ivanov	(Russia)	MF	1 September 1981 (aged 25)	Khimki	2005			
9	Artyom Beketov	(Russia)	MF	12 June 1984 (aged 22)	Chernomorets Novorossiysk	2004			
11	Maksim Astafyev	(Russia)	MF	8 December 1982 (aged 23)	Zenit St.Petersburg	2004			
13	Vladimir Kazakov	(Russia)	MF	26 November 1972 (aged 33)	Uralan Elista	2005			
15	Beslan Ajinjal	(Russia)	MF	22 June 1974 (aged 32)	Sokol Saratov	2005			
17	Aleksandr Sheshukov	(Russia)	MF	15 April 1983 (aged 23)	Spartak Moscow	2005			
21	Ruslan Ajinjal	(Russia)	MF	22 June 1974 (aged 32)	Terek Grozny	2006		27	2
22	Stanislav Reznikov	(Russia)	MF	8 April 1986 (aged 20)	Chernomorets Novorossiysk	2005			
24	Dmitry A. Smirnov	(Russia)	MF	13 August 1980 (aged 26)	Alania Vladikavkaz	2005			
27	Georgi Bazayev	(Russia)	MF	26 August 1978 (aged 28)	Alania Vladikavkaz	2006		21	4
29	Aleksey Arkhipov	(Russia)	MF	24 March 1983 (aged 23)	Dynamo Moscow	2004			
52	Viktor Sharov	(Russia)	MF	20 January 1986 (aged 20)	Youth Team	2006		0	0
53	Yevgeniy Ivanov	(Russia)	MF	30 November 1984 (aged 21)	Youth Team	2005			
58	Sergei Litvinov	(Russia)	MF	29 September 1986 (aged 20)	Youth Team	2006		0	0
65	Artyom Mikheyev	(Russia)	MF	28 October 1987 (aged 19)	Youth Team	2005			
Forwards
10	Aleksandr Tikhonovetsky	(Russia)	FW	11 April 1979 (aged 27)	Chernomorets Novorossiysk	2004			
12	Andrey Movsisyan	(Armenia)	FW	27 October 1975 (aged 31)	FC Moscow	2006		2	0
14	Roman Monaryov	(Ukraine)	FW	17 January 1980 (aged 26)	KAMAZ	2006		19	2
20	Andrei Ospeshinskiy	(Russia)	FW	26 September 1979 (aged 27)	Khimki	2006		28	3
28	Aleksandr Petukhov	(Russia)	FW	25 April 1980 (aged 26)	Metallurg Lipetsk	2005			
55	Nikita Zamoroka	(Russia)	FW	9 January 1986 (aged 20)	Youth Team	2005			
63	Anton Kasatkin	(Russia)	FW	12 July 1985 (aged 21)	Youth Team	2006		1	0
Away on loan
40	Willer	(Brazil)	MF	18 November 1979 (aged 27)	Dynamo Bryansk	2005			
Players that left Luch-Energiya Vladivostok during the season
3	Nail Minibayev	(Russia)	DF	16 March 1985 (aged 21)	Lada-Tolyatti	2006		1	0
16	Oleg Korolyov	(Russia)	GK	8 February 1975 (aged 31)	Baltika Kaliningrad	2004			
18	Kirill Makarov	(Russia)	FW	7 January 1987 (aged 19)	Zenit-2 St.Petersburg	2006		2	0
19	Maksim Avramov	(Russia)	DF	2 July 1987 (aged 19)	Zenit-2 St.Petersburg	2006		1	0

=== On loan ===
Note: Flags indicate national team as defined under FIFA eligibility rules; some limited exceptions apply. Players may hold more than one non-FIFA nationality.

No. / Pos. / Nation / Player; 40 / MF / BRA / Willer (at Oryol)	No. / Pos. / Nation / Player

=== Left club during season ===
Note: Flags indicate national team as defined under FIFA eligibility rules; some limited exceptions apply. Players may hold more than one non-FIFA nationality.

No.	Pos.	Nation	Player
3	DF	RUS	Nail Minibayev (to Kuban Krasnodar)
16	GK	RUS	Oleg Korolyov (to Kuban Krasnodar)

No.	Pos.	Nation	Player
18	FW	RUS	Kirill Makarov (to Khimki)
19	DF	RUS	Maksim Avramov (to Saturn Ramenskoye)

== Transfers ==
=== In ===
Date	Position	Nationality	Name	From	Fee	Ref.
Winter 2006	GK	(Georgia (country))	Giorgi Lomaia	Khimki	Undisclosed	
Winter 2006	DF	(Russia)	Maksim Avramov	Zenit-2 St.Petersburg	Undisclosed	
Winter 2006	DF	(Russia)	Nail Minibayev	Lada-Tolyatti	Undisclosed	
Winter 2006	DF	(Russia)	Roman Romanov	Zenit-2 St.Petersburg	Undisclosed	
Winter 2006	DF	(Ukraine)	Dmytro Semochko	Dnipro Dnipropetrovsk	Undisclosed	
Winter 2006	DF	(Russia)	Dmitri N. Smirnov	Khimki	Undisclosed	
Winter 2006	MF	(Russia)	Ruslan Ajinjal	Terek Grozny	Undisclosed	
Winter 2006	FW	(Armenia)	Andrey Movsisyan	Moscow	Undisclosed	
Winter 2006	FW	(Russia)	Kirill Makarov	Zenit-2 St.Petersburg	Undisclosed	
Winter 2006	FW	(Russia)	Andrei Ospeshinskiy	Khimki	Undisclosed	
Summer 2006	DF	(Belarus)	Syarhey Shtanyuk	Metalurh Zaporizhya	Undisclosed	
Summer 2006	MF	(Russia)	Georgi Bazayev	Alania Vladikavkaz	Undisclosed	
Summer 2006	FW	(Ukraine)	Roman Monaryov	KAMAZ	Undisclosed	

=== Loans in ===
Date from	Position	Nationality	Name	To	Date to	Ref.
Summer 2006	MF	(Russia)	Sergey Kuznetsov	Lokomotiv Moscow	End of Season	

=== Out ===
Date	Position	Nationality	Name	To	Fee	Ref.
Summer 2006	GK	(Russia)	Oleg Korolyov	Kuban Krasnodar	Undisclosed	
Summer 2006	DF	(Russia)	Maksim Avramov	Saturn Ramenskoye	Undisclosed	
Summer 2006	DF	(Russia)	Nail Minibayev	Kuban Krasnodar	Undisclosed	
Summer 2006	FW	(Russia)	Kirill Makarov	Khimki	Undisclosed	

=== Loans out ===
Date from	Position	Nationality	Name	To	Date to	Ref.
Summer 2006	MF	(Brazil)	Willer	Oryol	End of Season	

=== Released ===
Date	Position	Nationality	Name	Joined	Date
31 December 2006	GK	(Belarus)	Gennady Tumilovich	Dinamo Minsk	
31 December 2006	GK	(Georgia (country))	Giorgi Lomaia	Carl Zeiss Jena	
31 December 2006	GK	(Russia)	Roman Gerus	Rostov	
31 December 2006	DF	(Russia)	Aleksandr Cherkes	Shinnik Yaroslavl	
31 December 2006	DF	(Russia)	Dmitri Davydov	Zenit-2 St.Petersburg	
31 December 2006	DF	(Russia)	Dmitri Kabanov	Amur Blagoveshchensk	
31 December 2006	DF	(Russia)	Aleksandr Neproikin		
31 December 2006	DF	(Russia)	Roman Romanov	Zenit-2 St.Petersburg	
31 December 2006	MF	(Brazil)	Willer	Sūduva	4 April 2007
31 December 2006	MF	(Russia)	Artyom Beketov	Chernomorets Novorossiysk	
31 December 2006	MF	(Russia)	Vladimir Kazakov	Shinnik Yaroslavl	
31 December 2006	MF	(Russia)	Viktor Sharov		
31 December 2006	FW	(Armenia)	Andrey Movsisyan	Terek Grozny	
31 December 2006	FW	(Russia)	Aleksandr Petukhov	Dynamo St.Petersburg	
31 December 2006	FW	(Russia)	Nikita Zamoroka		
31 December 2006	FW	(Ukraine)	Roman Monaryov	Shinnik Yaroslavl	

== Competitions ==
=== Premier League ===
==== Results by round ====
Round	1	2	3	4	5	6	7	8	9	10	11	12	13	14	15	16	17	18	19	20	21	22	23	24	25	26	27	28	29	30
Ground	A	H	A	A	A	H	A	H	A	H	A	H	A	A	H	H	A	H	H	H	A	H	A	H	A	H	A	H	H	A
Result	D	D	L	L	L	W	L	W	L	W	D	W	L	L	W	W	L	W	D	L	L	W	W	W	L	W	L	W	L	D

Updated to match(es) played on 26 November 2006. Source: See Results
A = Away; H = Home; W = Win; D = Draw; L = Loss

==== Results ====
19 March 2006 1	Spartak Moscow	1 – 1	Luch-Energiya Vladivostok	Moscow
01:00 VLAT (UTC+10)	Rodríguez (yellow card) 10'; Titov (yellow card) 66'; Pavlyuchenko (yellow card) 68'; Bystrov 90+'	Report	Astafyev (yellow card) 5' (goal) 55'; Cherkes (yellow card) 88'; Gerus (yellow card) 89'	Stadium: Luzhniki Stadium; Attendance: 15,000; Referee: Vladimir Pettay

26 March 2006 2	Luch-Energiya Vladivostok	1 – 1	Lokomotiv Moscow	Vladivostok
17:00 VLAT (UTC+10)	Arkhipov 42' (yellow card) 43'; Astafyev (yellow card) 64'	Report	Loskov (yellow card) 22'; Starkov 59'; Kingston (yellow card) 86'	Stadium: Dynamo Stadium; Attendance: 10,200; Referee: Alexander Gonchar

2 April 2006 3	Rubin Kazan	1 – 0	Luch-Energia Vladivostok	Kazan
21:00 VLAT (UTC+10)	Domínguez 64' (yellow card) 90' (yellow-red card) 90+'; Gațcan (yellow card) 86'; Jalland (yellow card) 90+'	Report	Arkhipov (yellow card) 48'; D.N.Smirnov (yellow card) 65'; R.Ajinjal (yellow card) 83' (yellow-red card) 90+'; Cherkes (yellow card) 90+'	Stadium: Central Stadium; Attendance: 8,200; Referee: Alexander Kolobaev

8 April 2006 4	FC Moscow	2 – 1	Luch-Energiya Vladivostok	Moscow
23:00 VLAT (UTC+10)	Jop (yellow card) 37'; Kirichenko 64' (pen.); Adamov 86'	Report	B.Ajinjal (yellow card) 7'; Ivanov 25' (yellow card) 36'; Semochko (yellow card) 69'	Stadium: Eduard Streltsov Stadium; Attendance: 5,300; Referee: Sergey Timofeev

15 April 2006 5	Zenit St.Petersburg	3 – 1	Luch-Energiya Vladivostok	Saint Petersburg
03:00 VLAT (UTC+10)	Kerzhakov 12'; Škrtel (yellow card) 16'; Vlasov 66'; Arshavin 71'; Poškus (yellow card) 89'	Report	Ospeshinskiy 27'; Lobov (yellow card) 39'; Astafyev (yellow card) 48'; Arkhipov (yellow card) 82'	Stadium: Petrovsky Stadium; Attendance: 21,000; Referee: Alexey Nikolaev

22 April 2006 6	Luch-Energiya Vladivostok	2 – 0	Torpedo Moscow	Vladivostok
17:00 VLAT (UTC+10)	Ivanov 32', 77'; D.A.Smirnov (yellow card) 73'	Report	Zyryanov (yellow card) 38'; Stepanov (yellow card) 64'; Kantonistov (yellow card) 73'; Kolesnikov (red card) 90'	Stadium: Dynamo Stadium; Attendance: 10,200; Referee: Aleksandr Gvardis

30 April 2006 7	Dynamo Moscow	2 – 1	Luch-Energiya Vladivostok	Moscow
01:00 VLAT (UTC+10)	Romaschenko 12'; Bulykin 24'; Kolodin (yellow card) 31'; Fernández (yellow card) 73'	Report	B.Ajinjal (yellow card) 2'; Kazakov (yellow card) 30'; Tikhonovetsky 61'	Stadium: Dynamo Stadium; Attendance: 6,500; Referee: Nikolai Ivanov

5 July 2006 8	Luch-Energiya Vladivostok	1 – 0	Shinnik Yaroslavl	Vladivostok
17:00 VLAT (UTC+10)	Kazakov (yellow card) 17'; R.Ajinjal (yellow card) 30'; Sheshukov 58'; D.N.Smirnov (yellow card) 63'; Tikhonovetsky (yellow card) 78'; D.A.Smirnov (yellow card) 86'	Report	Horák (yellow card) 22'; Amelyanchuk (yellow card) 68'; Dmytrulin (yellow card) 70'; Nizhegorodov (yellow card) 77'	Stadium: Dynamo Stadium; Attendance: 9,800; Referee: Igor Zakharov

13 May 2006 9	Tom Tomsk	2 – 1	Luch-Energiya Vladivostok	Tomsk
21:00 VLAT (UTC+10)	Dyomkin 36' (yellow card) 88'; Kiselyov 47'; Pareiko (yellow card) 81'; Kulchy (yellow card) 90+'	Report	Arkhipov (yellow card) 6'; D.N.Smirnov (yellow card) 28'; Cherkes (yellow card) 79'; Tikhonovetsky 80'	Stadium: Trud Stadium; Attendance: 14,000; Referee: Alexey Tyumin

12 July 2006 10	Luch-Energiya Vladivostok	2 – 0	Saturn Ramenskoye	Vladivostok
19:00 VLAT (UTC+10)	R.Ajinjal 17'; Astafyev 22'; Sheshukov (yellow card) 32'; Bazayev (yellow card) 41'; D.A.Smirnov (yellow card) 45'; S.Kuznetsov (yellow card) 88'	Report	Nakhushev (yellow card) 24'; Petráš (yellow card) 26'; Vukčević (yellow card) 45'; Igonin (yellow card) 73'	Stadium: Dynamo Stadium; Attendance: 9,800; Referee: Alexey Nikolaev

16 July 2006 11	Amkar Perm	0 – 0	Luch-Energiya Vladivostok	Perm
23:00 VLAT (UTC+10)	Akhmetzyanov (yellow card) 13'; Savin (yellow card) 43'; Volkov (yellow card) 65'	Report	Cherkes (yellow card) 25'; R.Ajinjal (yellow card) 66'; Semochko (yellow card) 72'	Stadium: Zvezda Stadium; Attendance: 12,200; Referee: Alexei Kovalev

23 July 2006 12	Luch-Energiya Vladivostok	4 – 2	Rostov	Vladivostok
19:00 VLAT (UTC+10)	Monaryov 15'; D.A.Smirnov (yellow card) 33'; Tikhonovetsky 49'; Bazayev 61'; Sheshukov (yellow card) 72'; Arkhipov 76' (pen.); Semochko (yellow card) 80'	Report	Vještica (yellow card) 29'; Osinov 37' (penalty missed) 81'; Tanasijević (yellow card) 76'; Dantsev 83'	Stadium: Dynamo Stadium; Attendance: 9,700; Referee: Mikhail Veselovsky

31 July 2006 13	Krylia Sovetov	2 – 1	Luch-Energiya Vladivostok	Samara
01:00 VLAT (UTC+10)	Topić 64'; Husin 68'	Report	Kazakov (yellow card) 11'; Astafyev 16'	Stadium: Metallurg Stadium; Attendance: 20,000; Referee: Alexander Gonchar

4 August 2006 14	CSKA Moscow	2 – 1	Luch-Energiya Vladivostok	Moscow
02:00 VLAT (UTC+10)	Krasić 16'; Rahimić (yellow card) 27'; Olić 69'; Jô (penalty missed) 78'	Report	Tikhonovetsky (yellow card) 22' (yellow-red card) 45'; Semochko (yellow card) 29'; Ospeshinskiy 60'	Stadium: Dynamo Stadium; Attendance: 6,000; Referee: Aleksei Tyumin

13 August 2006 15	Luch-Energiya Vladivostok	1 – 0	Spartak Nalchik	Vladivostok
19:00 VLAT (UTC+10)	Cherkes (yellow card) 49'; R.Ajinjal (yellow card) 56'; B.Ajinjal (yellow card) 68' (goal) 86' (pen.)	Report	Mostovyi (yellow card) 20' (red card) 66'	Stadium: Dynamo Stadium; Attendance: 10,200; Referee: Yuri Baskakov

19 August 2006 16	Luch-Energiya Vladivostok	1 – 0	Spartak Moscow	Vladivostok
19:00 VLAT (UTC+10)	Tikhonovetsky (yellow card) 28'; Arkhipov (yellow card) 45'; Semochko (yellow card) 55'; Monaryov 87'	Report	Shpedt (yellow card) 57'; Rodríguez (yellow card) 90+'	Stadium: Dynamo Stadium; Attendance: 10,000; Referee: Toru Kamikawa

28 August 2006 17	Lokomotiv Moscow	3 – 0	Luch-Energiya Vladivostok	Moscow
VLAT (UTC+10)	Traoré 4'; Sychev 7'; Pashinin (yellow card) 44'; Kingston (yellow card) 84'; O'Connor 86'	Report	Shtanyuk (yellow card) 67'	Stadium: RZD Arena; Attendance: 9,623; Referee: Stanislav Sukhina

10 September 2006 18	Luch-Energiya Vladivostok	2 – 1	Rubin Kazan	Vladivostok
VLAT (UTC+10)	D.A.Smirnov 7', 37'	Report	Sibaya (yellow card) 78'; Gilmullin 79'	Stadium: Dynamo Stadium; Attendance: 9,300; Referee: Mikhail Veselovsky

16 September 2006 19	Luch-Energiya Vladivostok	1 – 1	FC Moscow	Vladivostok
19:00 VLAT (UTC+10)	Shtanyuk 26'; B.Ajinjal (yellow card) 31'; Semochko (yellow card) 83'	Report	Stoica (yellow card) 8'; Melyoshin 32'; Čížek (yellow card) 80'; Kozko (yellow card) 90'	Stadium: Dynamo Stadium; Attendance: 10,000; Referee: Vladimir Pettay

24 September 2006 20	Luch-Energiya Vladivostok	0 – 2	Zenit St.Petersburg	Vladivostok
19:00 VLAT (UTC+10)	Sheshukov (yellow card) 51'; Astafyev (yellow card) 55'; Cherkes (yellow card) 84'	Report	Arshavin 1'; Kim (yellow card) 8'; Shtanyuk 62' (o.g.)	Stadium: Dynamo Stadium; Attendance: 10,200; Referee: Igor Zakharov

3 October 2006 21	Torpedo Moscow	2 – 1	Luch-Energiya Vladivostok	Moscow
01:30 VLAT (UTC+10)	Golubov 20'; Florescu (yellow card) 32'; Tumasyan (yellow card) 55'; Jokić 85'; Borodin (yellow card) 90'	Report	B.Ajinjal 56' (pen.)	Stadium: Luzhniki Stadium; Attendance: 2,000; Referee: Alexei Kovalev

14 October 2006 22	Luch-Energiya Vladivostok	3 – 1	Dynamo Moscow	Vladivostok
19:00 VLAT (UTC+10)	D.A.Smirnov 4'; R.Ajinjal 9'; Bazayev 39'; B.Ajinjal (yellow card) 52'	Report	Khokhlov 8'; Skepskyi (yellow card) 32'; K.Kombarov (yellow card) 73'; Kolodin (yellow card) 75'; Romaschenko (yellow card) 77'	Stadium: Dynamo Stadium; Attendance: 10,000; Referee: Alexander Evstigneev

21 October 2006 23	Shinnik Yaroslavl	1 – 3	Luch-Energiya Vladivostok	Yaroslavl
01:00 VLAT (UTC+10)	Radosavljević (yellow card) 12'; Budiša (yellow card) 16'; Khazov 84'	Report	Arkhipov (yellow card) 13'; Bazayev 17'; Semochko (yellow card) 51' (goal) 80'; Sheshukov (yellow card) 58'; Cherkes (yellow card) 71'; D.A.Smirnov 76'; Astafyev (yellow card) 77'	Stadium: Shinnik Stadium; Attendance: 1,000; Referee: Alexander Gonchar

25 October 2006 24	Luch-Energiya Vladivostok	2 – 1	Tom Tomsk	Vladivostok
19:00 VLAT (UTC+10)	Lobov 9'; Sheshukov (yellow card) 43'; B.Ajinjal (yellow card) 64' (goal) 76' (pen.); Shtanyuk (yellow card) 78'	Report	Onyshchenko (yellow card) 11'; Pogrebnyak (yellow card) 28' (goal) 78' (pen.); Kaleshin (yellow card) 65'	Stadium: Dynamo Stadium; Attendance: 9,800; Referee: Eduard Malyi

30 October 2006 25	Saturn Ramenskoye	1 – 0	Luch-Energiya Vladivostok	Ramenskoye
00:00 VLAT (UTC+10)	Gyan (yellow card) 57'; Lebedenko 77'; Vukčević (yellow card) 90'	Report	D.N.Smirnov (yellow card) 45'; R.Ajinjal (yellow card) 71'; B.Ajinjal (yellow card) 87'	Stadium: Saturn Stadium; Attendance: 7,800; Referee: Vladimir Pettay

4 November 2006 26	Luch-Energiya Vladivostok	3 – 1	Amkar Perm	Vladivostok
18:00 VLAT (UTC+10)	Cherkes (yellow card) 29' (yellow-red card) 40'; Ivanov 35', 78'; B.Ajinjal 45' (pen.) (yellow card) 88'; Sheshukov (yellow card) 50'; Semochko (yellow card) 69'	Report	Kobenko (yellow card) 26' (goal) 65'; Paramonov (yellow card) 35'; Kushev (yellow card) 35'; Sarkisyan (yellow card) 37'; Cherenchikov (red card) 45'; Sirakov (yellow card) 73'; Dujmović (yellow card) 84'	Stadium: Dynamo Stadium; Attendance: 9,200; Referee: Yuri Baskakov

8 November 2006 27	Rostov	1 – 0	Luch-Energiya Vladivostok	Rostov-on-Don
21:00 VLAT (UTC+10)	Osinov 48'	Report		Stadium: Olimp-2; Attendance: 4,300; Referee: Aleksei Sergeyev

12 November 2006 28	Luch-Energiya Vladivostok	3 – 2	Krylia Sovetov	Vladivostok
VLAT (UTC+10)	Semochko (yellow card) 18'; Sheshukov (yellow card) 31'; Bazayev 37'; D.A.Smirnov 45'; Tikhonovetsky 71'; Gerus (yellow card) 90'	Report	Bulyga (yellow card) 46' (goal) 49'; Angbwa (yellow card) 51'; Skvernyuk 58' (yellow card) 67'	Stadium: Dynamo Stadium; Attendance: 9,500; Referee: Yuri Baskakov

18 November 2006 29	Luch-Energiya Vladivostok	0 – 4	CSKA Moscow	Vladivostok
21:00 VLAT (UTC+10)	Semochko (yellow card) 50'; Sheshukov (yellow card) 53'	Report	Carvalho 15'; Vágner Love 25', 49', 62'; Aldonin (yellow card) 67'	Stadium: Dynamo Stadium; Attendance: 10,000; Referee: Aleksandr Gvardis

26 November 2006 30	Spartak Nalchik	0 – 0	Luch-Energiya Vladivostok	Nalchik
23:00 VLAT (UTC+10)	Geperidze (yellow card) 76'; Michkov (yellow card) 82'; Poroshyn (yellow card) 87'	Report	Sheshukov (yellow card) 81'	Stadium: Spartak Stadium; Attendance: 14,000; Referee: Alexander Evstigneev

==== League table ====
Pos	Team	Pld	W	D	L	GF	GA	GD	Pts	Qualification or relegation
5	Rubin Kazan	30	14	7	9	45	35	+10	49	Qualification to Intertoto Cup second round
6	FC Moscow	30	10	13	7	41	37	+4	43	
7	Luch-Energiya Vladivostok	30	12	5	13	37	39	−2	41	
8	Tom Tomsk	30	11	8	11	35	33	+2	41	
9	Krylia Sovetov Samara	30	10	8	12	37	35	+2	38	

Source: RFPL
Rules for classification: 1st points; 2nd matches won; 3rd goal difference; 4th head-to-head (points, matches won, goal difference, goals scored, away goals scored); 5th goals scored; 6th away goals scored; 7th drawing of lots

=== Russian Cup ===
==== 2005-06 ====
5 March 2006 Last 16 1st leg	Luch-Energiya Vladivostok	0 – 1	Spartak Moscow	Moscow
00:00 VLAT (UTC+10)	Sheshukov (yellow card) 48'; Cherkes (yellow card) 85'	Report	Cavenaghi 5'	Stadium: Luzhniki Stadium; Attendance: 8,000; Referee: Aleksandr Gvardis
Note: Match played at the Luzhniki Stadium in Moscow, instead of Luch-Energiya Vladivostok's regular Dynamo Stadium in Vladivostok.

14 March 2006 Last 16 2nd leg	Spartak Moscow	1 – 0 (2 – 0 agg.)	Luch-Energiya Vladivostok	Moscow
01:00 VLAT (UTC+10)	Bystrov (yellow card) 16'; Cavenaghi 46'	Report	D.N.Smirnov (yellow card) 20'; Astafyev 32'	Stadium: Luzhniki Stadium; Attendance: 7,000; Referee: Stanislav Sukhina

==== 2006-07 ====
3 July 2006 Round of 32 1st leg	Dynamo Makhachkala	4 – 0	Luch-Energiya Vladivostok	Makhachkala
01:00 VLAT (UTC+10)	Stolbovoy 10'; Imrekov (yellow card) 25' (goal) 27'; Pinchuk 31'; Agalarov 34' (pen.) (yellow card) 79'; Sadirov (yellow card) 62'; Timofeyev (yellow card) 64'	Report	Petukhov (yellow card) 23'	Stadium: Dynamo Stadium; Attendance: 3,000; Referee: Igor Egorov

20 September 2006 Round of 32 2nd leg	Luch-Energiya Vladivostok	3 – 0 (3 – 4 agg.)	Dynamo Makhachkala	Vladivostok
19:00 VLAT (UTC+10)	Kazakov (yellow card) 15' (goal) 43' (pen.); Sheshukov 47'; Ospeshinskiy 86'	Report	Burziyev (yellow card) 12'; K.Gomlenko (yellow card) 42'; Udoh (yellow card) 55'; Khan (yellow card) 69'; Tonga (yellow card) 89'; Sadirov (yellow card) 90+'	Stadium: Dynamo Stadium; Attendance: 7,000; Referee: Mikhail Veselovski

== Squad statistics ==
As of match played 26 November 2006

=== Appearances and goals ===
No.	Pos	Nat	Player	Total		Premier League		2005-06 Russian Cup		2006-07 Russian Cup	
No.	Pos	Nat	Player	Apps	Goals	Apps	Goals	Apps	Goals	Apps	Goals
1	GK	(Russia) RUS	Roman Gerus	25	0	23	0	2	0	0	0
2	DF	(Russia) RUS	Konstantin Lobov	9	1	5+2	1	0	0	2	0
4	DF	(Russia) RUS	Dmitri Davydov	10	0	7+2	0	0	0	1	0
5	DF	(Russia) RUS	Aleksandr Cherkes	28	0	26	0	2	0	0	0
6	MF	(Russia) RUS	Sergey Kuznetsov	3	0	1+1	0	0	0	1	0
7	MF	(Russia) RUS	Yevgeni Kuznetsov	14	0	2+8	0	0+2	0	2	0
8	MF	(Russia) RUS	Aleksei Ivanov	20	5	17+1	5	2	0	0	0
9	MF	(Russia) RUS	Artyom Beketov	3	0	0+2	0	0	0	1	0
10	FW	(Russia) RUS	Aleksandr Tikhonovetsky	18	4	7+9	4	0+1	0	0+1	0
11	MF	(Russia) RUS	Maksim Astafyev	25	3	15+7	3	2	0	0+1	0
12	FW	(Armenia) ARM	Andrey Movsisyan	2	0	0+1	0	0+1	0	0	0
14	FW	(Ukraine) UKR	Roman Monaryov	19	2	2+15	2	0	0	2	0
15	MF	(Russia) RUS	Beslan Ajinjal	31	4	29	4	2	0	0	0
17	MF	(Russia) RUS	Aleksandr Sheshukov	31	2	28	1	2	0	1	1
20	FW	(Russia) RUS	Andrei Ospeshinskiy	28	3	19+6	2	2	0	0+1	1
21	MF	(Russia) RUS	Ruslan Ajinjal	27	2	25	2	2	0	0	0
22	MF	(Russia) RUS	Stanislav Reznikov	5	0	0+2	0	0+1	0	2	0
24	MF	(Russia) RUS	Dmitry A. Smirnov	26	5	20+5	5	0+1	0	0	0
25	DF	(Russia) RUS	Roman Romanov	3	0	1	0	2	0	0	0
27	MF	(Russia) RUS	Georgi Bazayev	21	4	21	4	0	0	0	0
28	FW	(Russia) RUS	Aleksandr Petukhov	3	0	0+2	0	0	0	1	0
29	MF	(Russia) RUS	Aleksey Arkhipov	26	2	13+10	2	2	0	1	0
30	DF	(Russia) RUS	Dmitri N. Smirnov	20	0	13+4	0	2	0	1	0
33	DF	(Belarus) BLR	Syarhey Shtanyuk	19	1	18	1	0	0	1	0
35	DF	(Ukraine) UKR	Dmytro Semochko	27	1	24+3	1	0	0	0	0
42	GK	(Georgia (country)) GEO	Giorgi Lomaia	9	0	7	0	0	0	2	0
59	DF	(Russia) RUS	Dmitri Kabanov	1	0	0	0	0	0	0+1	0
63	FW	(Russia) RUS	Anton Kasatkin	1	0	0	0	0	0	0+1	0
65	MF	(Russia) RUS	Artem Mekheev	1	0	0	0	0	0	0+1	0
Players away from the club on loan:
Players who appeared for Luch-Energiya Vladivostok but left during the season:
3	DF	(Russia) RUS	Nail Minibayev	1	0	0	0	0	0	1	0
13	MF	(Russia) RUS	Vladimir Kazakov	9	1	7+1	0	0	0	1	1
18	FW	(Russia) RUS	Kirill Makarov	2	0	0+1	0	0	0	1	0
19	DF	(Russia) RUS	Maksim Avramov	1	0	0	0	0	0	1	0

=== Goal scorers ===
Place	Position	Nation	Number	Name	Premier League	2005-06 Russian Cup	2006-07 Russian Cup	Total
1	MF	(Russia)	8	Aleksei Ivanov	5	0	0	5
1	MF	(Russia)	24	Dmitry A. Smirnov	5	0	0	5
3	MF	(Russia)	15	Beslan Ajinjal	4	0	0	4
3	MF	(Russia)	27	Georgi Bazayev	4	0	0	4
3	FW	(Russia)	10	Aleksandr Tikhonovetsky	4	0	0	4
6	MF	(Russia)	11	Maksim Astafyev	3	0	0	3
6	FW	(Russia)	20	Andrei Ospeshinskiy	2	0	1	3
8	MF	(Russia)	21	Ruslan Ajinjal	2	0	0	2
8	MF	(Russia)	29	Aleksey Arkhipov	2	0	0	2
8	FW	(Ukraine)	14	Roman Monaryov	2	0	0	2
8	MF	(Russia)	17	Aleksandr Sheshukov	1	0	1	2
12	DF	(Ukraine)	35	Dmytro Semochko	1	0	0	1
12	DF	(Belarus)	33	Syarhey Shtanyuk	1	0	0	1
12	DF	(Russia)	2	Konstantin Lobov	1	0	0	1
12	MF	(Russia)	13	Vladimir Kazakov	0	0	1	1
Total					37	0	3	40

=== Clean sheets ===
Place	Position	Nation	Number	Name	Premier League	2005-06 Russian Cup	2006-07 Russian Cup	Total
1	GK	(Russia)	1	Roman Gerus	6	0	0	6
2	GK	(Georgia (country))	42	Giorgi Lomaia	1	0	1	2
TOTALS					7	0	1	8

=== Disciplinary record ===
Number	Nation	Position	Name	Premier League		2005-06 Russian Cup		2006-07 Russian Cup		Total	
Number	Nation	Position	Name	Booked	Sent off (straight red)	Booked	Sent off (straight red)	Booked	Sent off (straight red)	Booked	Sent off (straight red)
1	(Russia)	GK	Roman Gerus	2	0	0	0	0	0	2	0
2	(Russia)	DF	Konstantin Lobov	1	0	0	0	0	0	1	0
5	(Russia)	DF	Aleksandr Cherkes	9	1	1	0	0	0	10	1
6	(Russia)	MF	Sergey Kuznetsov	1	0	0	0	0	0	1	0
8	(Russia)	MF	Aleksei Ivanov	1	0	0	0	0	0	1	0
10	(Russia)	FW	Aleksandr Tikhonovetsky	4	1	0	0	0	0	4	1
11	(Russia)	MF	Maksim Astafyev	5	0	0	0	0	0	5	0
13	(Russia)	MF	Vladimir Kazakov	3	0	0	0	1	0	4	0
15	(Russia)	MF	Beslan Ajinjal	7	0	0	0	0	0	7	0
17	(Russia)	MF	Aleksandr Sheshukov	9	0	1	0	0	0	10	0
21	(Russia)	MF	Ruslan Ajinjal	7	1	0	0	0	0	7	1
24	(Russia)	MF	Dmitry A. Smirnov	4	0	0	0	0	0	4	0
27	(Russia)	MF	Georgi Bazayev	1	0	0	0	0	0	1	0
29	(Russia)	MF	Aleksey Arkhipov	6	0	0	0	0	0	6	0
28	(Russia)	FW	Aleksandr Petukhov	0	0	0	0	1	0	1	0
30	(Russia)	DF	Dmitri N. Smirnov	4	0	1	0	0	0	5	0
33	(Belarus)	DF	Syarhey Shtanyuk	2	0	0	0	0	0	2	0
35	(Ukraine)	DF	Dmytro Semochko	10	0	0	0	0	0	10	0
Players away on loan:
Players who left Luch-Energiya Vladivostok during the season:
Total				76	3	3	0	2	0	81	3
