= 2007 FC Luch-Energiya Vladivostok season =

Luch-Energiya Vladivostok
2007 season
- Manager: Sergei Pavlov
- Stadium: Dynamo Stadium
- Premier League: 14th
- Russian Cup: Round of 32 vs Metallurg Krasnoyarsk
- Top goalscorer: League: Igor Strelkov (5); All: Igor Strelkov (5)

The 2007 Luch-Energiya Vladivostok season was the club's 3rd season in the Russian Premier League, and their second since 1993. Luch-Energiya Vladivostok finished the season in 14th, narrowly avoiding relegation on matches won, and were knocked out of the 2007–08 Russian Cup by Metallurg Krasnoyarsk at the Round of 32 stage.

== Squad ==
As of match played 11 November 2007

| No. | Name | Nationality | Position | Date of birth (age) | Signed from | Signed in | Contract ends | Apps. | Goals |
Goalkeepers
| 1 | Aleksandr Chikhradze | (Russia) | GK | 17 August 1975 (aged 32) | Spartak Nalchik | 2007 | | 5 | 0 |
| 23 | Marek Čech | (Czech Republic) | GK | 8 April 1976 (aged 31) | Slovan Liberec | 2007 | 2009 | 25 | 0 |
| 69 | Andrei Fisenko | (Russia) | GK | 16 July 1987 (aged 20) | Youth Team | 2007 | | 0 | 0 |
| 90 | Kirill Muzyka | (Russia) | GK | 22 November 1990 (aged 16) | Youth Team | 2007 | | 1 | 0 |
Defenders
| 2 | Konstantin Lobov | (Russia) | DF | 2 May 1981 (aged 26) | Zenit St.Petersburg | 2004 | | | |
| 3 | Dmytro Semochko | (Ukraine) | DF | 25 January 1979 (aged 28) | Dnipro Dnipropetrovsk | 2006 | | 52 | 2 |
| 4 | Rade Novković | (Serbia) | DF | 25 June 1980 (aged 27) | Rad | 2007 | | 14 | 0 |
| 5 | Igor Kralevski | (North Macedonia) | DF | 10 November 1978 (aged 29) | Hajduk Split | 2007 | | 18 | 0 |
| 6 | Marian Palát | (Czech Republic) | DF | 1 June 1977 (aged 30) | Mladá Boleslav | 2007 | | 4 | 0 |
| 13 | Syarhey Shtanyuk | (Belarus) | DF | 13 August 1973 (aged 34) | Metalurh Zaporizhya | 2006 | | 46 | 1 |
| 25 | Anatoli Skvortsov | (Ukraine) | DF | 24 November 1976 (aged 30) | Shinnik Yaroslavl | 2007 | | 7 | 0 |
| 30 | Dmitri N. Smirnov | (Russia) | DF | 9 November 1980 (aged 27) | Khimki | 2006 | | 44 | 1 |
| 35 | Pavel Hannesen | (Russia) | DF | 19 February 1986 (aged 21) | Youth Team | 2005 | | | |
| 60 | Sergei Fisenko | (Russia) | DF | 16 July 1987 (aged 20) | Youth Team | 2007 | | 0 | 0 |
| 84 | Roman Kishkaruk | (Russia) | DF | 18 November 1989 (aged 17) | Youth Team | 2007 | | 0 | 0 |
Midfielders
| 7 | Yevgeni Kuznetsov | (Russia) | MF | 2 December 1983 (aged 23) | Dynamo Moscow | 2004 | | | |
| 11 | Maksim Astafyev | (Russia) | MF | 8 December 1982 (aged 24) | Zenit St.Petersburg | 2004 | | | |
| 15 | Beslan Ajinjal | (Russia) | MF | 22 June 1974 (aged 33) | Sokol Saratov | 2005 | | | |
| 17 | Aleksandr Sheshukov | (Russia) | MF | 15 April 1983 (aged 24) | Spartak Moscow | 2005 | | | |
| 21 | Ruslan Ajinjal | (Russia) | MF | 22 June 1974 (aged 33) | Terek Grozny | 2006 | | 54 | 2 |
| 22 | Levan Gvazava | (Georgia (country)) | MF | 8 July 1980 (aged 27) | Spartak Nalchik | 2007 | | 9 | 1 |
| 24 | Dmitry A. Smirnov | (Russia) | MF | 13 August 1980 (aged 27) | Alania Vladikavkaz | 2005 | | | |
| 27 | Georgi Bazayev | (Russia) | MF | 26 August 1978 (aged 29) | Alania Vladikavkaz | 2006 | | 46 | 8 |
| 29 | Aleksey Arkhipov | (Russia) | MF | 24 March 1983 (aged 24) | Dynamo Moscow | 2004 | | | |
| 58 | Sergei Litvinov | (Russia) | MF | 29 September 1986 (aged 21) | Youth Team | 2006 | | 0 | 0 |
| 77 | Roman Voydel | (Russia) | MF | 16 July 1985 (aged 22) | Metallurg Lipetsk | 2007 | | 2 | 0 |
| 87 | Artyom Mikheyev | (Russia) | MF | 28 October 1987 (aged 20) | Youth Team | 2005 | | | |
| 99 | Yevgeniy Ivanov | (Russia) | MF | 30 November 1984 (aged 22) | Youth Team | 2005 | | | |
Forwards
| 9 | Vital Lanko | (Belarus) | FW | 4 April 1977 (aged 30) | Spartak Nalchik | 2007 | | 11 | 0 |
| 10 | Aleksandr Tikhonovetsky | (Russia) | FW | 11 April 1979 (aged 28) | Chernomorets Novorossiysk | 2004 | | | |
| 12 | Igor Strelkov | (Russia) | FW | 21 March 1982 (aged 25) | Kuban Krasnodar | 2007 | | 13 | 5 |
| 14 | Semyon Melnikov | (Russia) | FW | 27 January 1985 (aged 22) | loan from Zenit St.Petersburg | 2007 | | 9 | 0 |
| 20 | Andrei Ospeshinskiy | (Russia) | FW | 26 September 1979 (aged 28) | Khimki | 2006 | | 35 | 3 |
| 28 | Nenad Stojanović | (Serbia) | FW | 22 October 1979 (aged 28) | Brussels | 2007 | 2009 | 12 | 0 |
| 31 | Vladimir Merkulov | (Russia) | FW | 9 June 1989 (aged 18) | Youth Team | 2007 | | 0 | 0 |
| 32 | Viktor Fomichyov | (Russia) | FW | 4 January 1989 (aged 18) | Youth Team | 2007 | | 1 | 0 |
| 56 | Maksim Kazakov | (Russia) | FW | 7 April 1987 (aged 20) | Youth Team | 2007 | | 0 | 0 |
| 63 | Anton Kasatkin | (Russia) | FW | 12 July 1985 (aged 22) | Youth Team | 2006 | | 2 | 0 |
Away on loan
| 22 | Stanislav Reznikov | (Russia) | MF | 8 April 1986 (aged 21) | Chernomorets Novorossiysk | 2005 | | | |
Players that left Luch-Energiya Vladivostok during the season
| 8 | Aleksei Ivanov | (Russia) | MF | 1 September 1981 (aged 26) | Khimki | 2005 | | | |
| 33 | Denis Bolshakov | (Russia) | MF | 7 June 1987 (aged 20) | Dynamo Moscow | 2007 | | 3 | 0 |

=== On loan ===
Note: Flags indicate national team as defined under FIFA eligibility rules; some limited exceptions apply. Players may hold more than one non-FIFA nationality.

| No. / Pos. / Nation / Player; 22 / MF / RUS / Stanislav Reznikov (to Nosta Novotroitsk) | No. / Pos. / Nation / Player |

=== Left club during season ===
Note: Flags indicate national team as defined under FIFA eligibility rules; some limited exceptions apply. Players may hold more than one non-FIFA nationality.

| No. / Pos. / Nation / Player; 8 / MF / RUS / Aleksei Ivanov (to Saturn Ramenskoye) | No. / Pos. / Nation / Player; 33 / MF / RUS / Denis Bolshakov (to SKA-Energia Khabarovsk) |

== Transfers ==
=== In ===
| Date | Position | Nationality | Name | From | Fee | Ref. |
|---|---|---|---|---|---|---|
| 4 January 2007 | GK | (Czech Republic) | Marek Čech | Slovan Liberec | Undisclosed | |
| 13 February 2007 | FW | (Serbia) | Nenad Stojanović | Brussels | Undisclosed | |
| Winter 2007 | GK | (Russia) | Aleksandr Chikhradze | Spartak Nalchik | Undisclosed | |
| Winter 2007 | DF | (North Macedonia) | Igor Kralevski | Hajduk Split | Undisclosed | |
| Winter 2007 | DF | (Serbia) | Rade Novković | Rad | Undisclosed | |
| Winter 2007 | MF | (Russia) | Denis Bolshakov | Dynamo Moscow | Undisclosed | |
| Winter 2007 | MF | (Russia) | Roman Voydel | Metallurg Lipetsk | Undisclosed | |
| 20 July 2007 | DF | (Czech Republic) | Marian Palát | Mladá Boleslav | Undisclosed | |
| Summer 2007 | DF | (Ukraine) | Anatoli Skvortsov | Shinnik Yaroslavl | Undisclosed | |
| Summer 2007 | MF | (Georgia (country)) | Levan Gvazava | Spartak Nalchik | Undisclosed | |
| Summer 2007 | FW | (Belarus) | Vital Lanko | Spartak Nalchik | Undisclosed | |
| Summer 2007 | FW | (Russia) | Igor Strelkov | Kuban Krasnodar | Undisclosed | |

=== Loans in ===
| Date from | Position | Nationality | Name | To | Date to | Ref. |
|---|---|---|---|---|---|---|
| Winter 2007 | FW | (Russia) | Semyon Melnikov | Zenit St.Petersburg | Undisclosed | |

=== Out ===
| Date | Position | Nationality | Name | To | Fee | Ref. |
|---|---|---|---|---|---|---|
| Winter 2007 | MF | (Russia) | Denis Bolshakov | SKA-Energia Khabarovsk | Undisclosed | |
| Winter 2007 | MF | (Russia) | Aleksei Ivanov | Saturn Ramenskoye | Undisclosed | |

=== Loans out ===
| Date from | Position | Nationality | Name | To | Date to | Ref. |
|---|---|---|---|---|---|---|
| Winter 2007 | MF | (Russia) | Stanislav Reznikov | Nosta Novotroitsk | End of Season | |

=== Released ===
| Date | Position | Nationality | Name | Joined | Date |
|---|---|---|---|---|---|
| 31 December 2007 | DF | (Belarus) | Syarhey Shtanyuk | Rostov | |
| 31 December 2007 | DF | (Russia) | Sergei Fisenko | | |
| 31 December 2007 | DF | (Russia) | Pavel Hannesen | | |
| 31 December 2007 | DF | (Russia) | Konstantin Lobov | Vityaz Podolsk | |
| 31 December 2007 | DF | (Ukraine) | Dmytro Semochko | Shinnik Yaroslavl | |
| 31 December 2007 | DF | (Ukraine) | Anatoli Skvortsov | Chernomorets Novorossiysk | |
| 31 December 2007 | MF | (Russia) | Beslan Ajinjal | Tom Tomsk | |
| 31 December 2007 | MF | (Russia) | Ruslan Ajinjal | Krylia Sovetov | |
| 31 December 2007 | MF | (Russia) | Aleksey Arkhipov | Vityaz Podolsk | |
| 31 December 2007 | MF | (Russia) | Maksim Astafyev | Rostov | |
| 31 December 2007 | MF | (Russia) | Yevgeniy Ivanov | | |
| 31 December 2007 | MF | (Russia) | Sergei Litvinov | | |
| 31 December 2007 | FW | (Russia) | Anton Kasatkin | | |
| 31 December 2007 | FW | (Russia) | Vladimir Merkulov | | |
| 31 December 2007 | FW | (Russia) | Andrei Ospeshinskiy | | |
| 31 December 2007 | FW | (Russia) | Igor Strelkov | Tom Tomsk | |

== Competitions ==
=== Premier League ===
==== Results by round ====
| Round | 1 | 2 | 3 | 4 | 5 | 6 | 7 | 8 | 9 | 10 | 11 | 12 | 13 | 14 | 15 | 16 | 17 | 18 | 19 | 20 | 21 | 22 | 23 | 24 | 25 | 26 | 27 | 28 | 29 | 30 |
|---|---|---|---|---|---|---|---|---|---|---|---|---|---|---|---|---|---|---|---|---|---|---|---|---|---|---|---|---|---|---|
| Ground | H | A | H | A | H | H | H | H | A | H | A | H | H | H | A | H | A | H | A | A | A | A | H | A | H | A | A | A | H | A |
| Result | L | W | D | L | W | L | L | D | L | D | L | W | W | D | L | W | D | D | L | L | L | L | D | W | W | L | D | L | W | L |

Updated to match(es) played on 11 November 2007. Source: See Results
A = Away; H = Home; W = Win; D = Draw; L = Loss

==== Results ====
| 10 March 2007 1 | Luch-Energiya Vladivostok | 0 – 1 | FC Moscow | Vladivostok |
| 18:00 VLAT (UTC+10) | Lobov (yellow card) 80' | Report | Bracamonte (yellow card) 28' (goal) 35'; Stoica (yellow card) 90' | Stadium: Dynamo Stadium; Attendance: 9,300; Referee: Aleksandr Gvardis |

| 19 March 2007 2 | Saturn Ramenskoye | 0 – 1 | Luch-Energiya Vladivostok | Ramenskoye |
| 00:00 VLAT (UTC+10) | Igonin (yellow card) 65'; Ďurica (yellow card) 71' | Report | Semochko (yellow card) 25'; B.Ajinjal 65' (pen.) (yellow card) 82' | Stadium: Saturn Stadium; Attendance: 9,360; Referee: Yuri Klyuchnikov |

| 1 April 2007 3 | Luch-Energiya Vladivostok | 1 – 1 | Rostov | Vladivostok |
| 18:00 VLAT (UTC+10) | B.Ajinjal 36' (pen.); Sheshukov (yellow card) 89' | Report | Kalachev (yellow card) 25'; Blyznyuk (yellow card) 27'; Pjanović (yellow card) 40'; Dantsev 90' | Stadium: Dynamo Stadium; Attendance: 10,000; Referee: Alexander Evstigneev |

| 9 April 2007 4 | Spartak Moscow | 2 – 1 | Luch-Energiya Vladivostok | Moscow |
| 00:00 VLAT (UTC+10) | Titov 75'; Prudnikov 87' | Report | Novković (yellow card) 32'; Ivanov 63' | Stadium: Luzhniki Stadium; Attendance: 22,000; Referee: Stanislav Sukhina |

| 14 April 2007 5 | Luch-Energiya Vladivostok | 1 – 0 | Amkar Perm | Vladivostok |
| 19:00 VLAT (UTC+10) | Bazayev 36'; D.A.Smirnov (yellow card) 52'; R.Ajinjal (yellow card) 57'; Novković (yellow card) 66'; Shtanyuk (yellow card) 83' | Report | Sirakov (yellow card) 69'; Dujmović (yellow card) 78' (yellow-red card) 83'; Soldevilla (yellow card) 84' | Stadium: Dynamo Stadium; Attendance: 9,700; Referee: Igor Zakharov |

| 22 April 2007 6 | Luch-Energiya Vladivostok | 0 – 1 | Zenit St.Petersburg | Vladivostok |
| 19:00 VLAT (UTC+10) | Semochko (red card) 33'; Novković (yellow card) 63' | Report | Škrtel (yellow card) 58'; Hagen (yellow card) 64'; Zyryanov 81' | Stadium: Dynamo Stadium; Attendance: 10,200; Referee: Valentin Ivanov |

| 28 April 2007 7 | Luch-Energiya Vladivostok | 0 – 1 | Dynamo Moscow | Vladivostok |
| 18:00 VLAT (UTC+10) | Shtanyuk (yellow card) 24' | Report | Tochilin (yellow card) 34'; Karpovich (yellow card) 45+'; Danny 56'; D.Kombarov (yellow card) 79'; Shunin (yellow card) 82' | Stadium: Dynamo Stadium; Attendance: 9,800; Referee: Nikolai Ivanov |

| 5 May 2007 8 | Luch-Energiya Vladivostok | 0 – 0 | Tom Tomsk | Vladivostok |
| 18:00 VLAT (UTC+10) | Shtanyuk (yellow card) 35'; Kralevski (yellow card) 73'; D.A.Smirnov (yellow card) 77' | Report | Skoblyakov (yellow card) 17'; Michkov (yellow card) 62' | Stadium: Dynamo Stadium; Attendance: 8,500; Referee: Alexander Kolobaev |

| 12 May 2007 9 | Krylia Sovetov | 3 – 0 | Luch-Energiya Vladivostok | Samara |
| 23:00 VLAT (UTC+10) | Medvedev 17'; Mujiri 37'; Shvetsov 55' | Report | Tikhonovetsky (yellow card) 45'; Lobov (yellow card) 52' | Stadium: Metallurg Stadium; Attendance: 9,000; Referee: Yuri Baskakov |

| 20 May 2007 10 | Luch-Energiya Vladivostok | 1 – 1 | Kuban Krasnodar | Krasnodar |
| 03:00 VLAT (UTC+10) | Shtanyuk (yellow card) 7'; R.Ajinjal (yellow card) 24'; Bazayev 37' (yellow card) 55'; Semochko (yellow card) 41' | Report | Laizāns 7'; Orekhov (yellow card) 24'; Ivanov (yellow card) 59' | Stadium: Kuban Stadium; Attendance: 24,000; Referee: Igor Egorov |
Note: Match played at the Kuban Stadium in Krasnodar, instead of Luch-Energiya Vladivostok's regular Dynamo Stadium in Vladivostok.

| 26 May 2007 11 | Rubin Kazan | 3 – 0 | Luch-Energia Vladivostok | Kazan |
| 21:00 VLAT (UTC+10) | Gabriel 16'; Baýramow 43', 89' (yellow card) 84'; Vasilyev (yellow card) 64'; Volkov (yellow card) 73' | Report | R.Ajinjal (yellow card) 43'; Novković (yellow card) 52'; B.Ajinjal (penalty missed) 80' | Stadium: Central Stadium; Attendance: 8,000; Referee: Aleksei Sergeyev |

| 10 June 2007 12 | Luch-Energiya Vladivostok | 4 – 0 | CSKA Moscow | Vladivostok |
| 19:00 VLAT (UTC+10) | Tikhonovetsky 5'; Ivanov 15'; R.Ajinjal (yellow card) 57'; Shtanyuk (yellow card) 62'; Bazayev 67', 84' (yellow card) 84'; B.Ajinjal (yellow card) 69' | Report | Vágner Love (yellow card) 42'; A.Berezutski (yellow card) 63'; Ignashevich (yellow card) 90' | Stadium: Dynamo Stadium; Attendance: 10,000; Referee: Alexander Gonchar |

| 16 June 2007 13 | Luch-Energiya Vladivostok | 3 – 0 | Lokomotiv Moscow | Vladivostok |
| 19:00 VLAT (UTC+10) | Ivanov 10', 66'; Sheshukov 88' | Report | Loskov (yellow card) 56'; Gurenko (yellow card) 77'; Spahić (yellow card) 82'; Jakupović (yellow card) 88'; Yefimov (yellow card) 90+' | Stadium: Dynamo Stadium; Attendance: 10,000; Referee: Aleksandr Gvardis |

| 23 June 2007 14 | Luch-Energiya Vladivostok | 1 – 1 | Khimki | Vladivostok |
| 19:00 VLAT (UTC+10) | Tikhonovetsky (yellow card) 60' (goal) 75'; Sheshukov (yellow card) 90' | Report | Stepanov (yellow card) 41'; Shirokov 57' (yellow card) 79'; Antipenko (yellow card) 81' | Stadium: Dynamo Stadium; Attendance: 10,000; Referee: Aleksei Nikolaev |

| 1 July 2007 15 | Spartak Nalchik | 2 – 0 | Luch-Energiya Vladivostok | Nalchik |
| 04:00 VLAT (UTC+10) | Džudović 17' (yellow card) 59'; Gvazava (yellow card) 41'; Samsonov (yellow card) 59'; Pylypchuk 70'; Geteriev (yellow card) 90+' | Report | D.N.Smirnov (yellow card) 19'; Tikhonovetsky (yellow card) 52'; Sheshukov (yellow card) 59'; B.Ajinjal (yellow card) 59'; R.Ajinjal (yellow card) 65' | Stadium: Spartak Stadium; Attendance: 10,000; Referee: Maksim Layushkin |

| 14 July 2007 16 | Luch-Energiya Vladivostok | 2 – 1 | Saturn Ramenskoye | Vladivostok |
| 19:00 VLAT (UTC+10) | Shtanyuk (yellow card) 3'; Čech (yellow card) 65'; Semochko (yellow card) 65'; B.Ajinjal (yellow card) 67'; Tikhonovetsky 71' (pen.); Sheshukov 74' | Report | Igonin (yellow card) 6'; Karyaka (penalty missed) 66' 66'; Eremenko (yellow card) 69' | Stadium: Dynamo Stadium; Attendance: 9,500; Referee: Igor Zakharov |

| 22 July 2007 17 | Rostov | 1 – 1 | Luch-Energiya Vladivostok | Rostov-on-Don |
| 04:00 VLAT (UTC+10) | Mogilevskiy (yellow card) 29'; Vještica (yellow card) 52'; Buznikin (yellow card) 67'; Kalachev 75' | Report | Tikhonovetsky 12'; R.Ajinjal (yellow card) 47'; Shtanyuk (yellow card) 85'; Ivanov (yellow card) 88' | Stadium: Olimp-2; Attendance: 7,000; Referee: Yuri Baskakov |

| 28 July 2007 18 | Luch-Energiya Vladivostok | 1 – 1 | Spartak Moscow | Vladivostok |
| 19:00 VLAT (UTC+10) | D.N.Smirnov 9' (yellow card) 53'; D.A.Smirnov (yellow card) 58'; Kralevski (yellow card) 63'; R.Ajinjal (yellow card) 67' | Report | Kalynychenko (yellow card) 21' (yellow-red card) 90'; Titov (yellow card) 45'; Prudnikov 53'; Kováč (yellow card) 74' | Stadium: Dynamo Stadium; Attendance: 10,200; Referee: Valentin Ivanov |

| 4 August 2007 19 | Amkar Perm | 1 – 0 | Luch-Energiya Vladivostok | Perm |
| 23:30 VLAT (UTC+10) | Kushev 57' (pen.) (yellow card) 64'; Kobenko (yellow card) 72' | Report | Astafyev (yellow card) 16'; Shtanyuk (yellow card) 24'; Strelkov (yellow card) 80' | Stadium: Zvezda Stadium; Attendance: 14,700; Referee: Alexei Kovalev |

| 11 August 2007 20 | Zenit St.Petersburg | 3 – 1 | Luch-Energiya Vladivostok | Saint Petersburg |
| 23:30 VLAT (UTC+10) | Zyryanov 27', 77'; Arshavin 84' | Report | Kralevski (yellow card) 20'; Ajinjal (yellow card) 54'; Strelkov 59'; Semochko (yellow card) 78' | Stadium: Petrovsky Stadium; Attendance: 20,500; Referee: Aleksei Nikolaev |

| 19 August 2007 21 | Dynamo Moscow | 1 – 0 | Luch-Energiya Vladivostok | Moscow |
| 02:00 VLAT (UTC+10) | K.Kombarov 18'; Custódio (yellow card) 52'; Granat (yellow card) 71'; Pimenov (yellow card) 75'; Shunin (yellow card) 78' | Report | R.Ajinjal (yellow card) 14'; Astafyev (yellow card) 70'; Shtanyuk (yellow card) 78' | Stadium: Dynamo Stadium; Attendance: 7,000; Referee: Yuri Klyuchnikov |

| 25 August 2007 22 | Tom Tomsk | 3 – 1 | Luch-Energiya Vladivostok | Tomsk |
| 23:15 VLAT (UTC+10) | Radosavljević 45+'; Skoblyakov 76'; Bugayev (yellow card) 82'; Michkov (yellow card) 88'; Kulchy 90' | Report | Skvortsov (yellow card) 26'; Lanko (yellow card) 40'; Gvazava (yellow card) 61'; Semochko (yellow card) 63'; Klimov 69' (o.g.); Kralevski (yellow card) 79' | Stadium: Trud Stadium; Attendance: 14,500; Referee: Yuri Baskakov |

| 1 September 2007 23 | Luch-Energiya Vladivostok | 0 – 0 | Krylia Sovetov | Vladivostok |
| 19:00 VLAT (UTC+10) | Tikhonovetsky (yellow card) 28'; Semochko (yellow card) 68'; Skvortsov (yellow card) 80' | Report | Bobyor (yellow card) 28'; Łągiewka (yellow card) 58' | Stadium: Dynamo Stadium; Attendance: 9,800; Referee: Igor Egorov |

| 22 September 2007 24 | Kuban Krasnodar | 0 – 1 | Luch-Energiya Vladivostok | Krasnodar |
| VLAT (UTC+10) | Petkov (yellow card) 35'; Lengyel (yellow card) 64'; Kaleshin (yellow card) 69'; Gabulov (yellow card) 83'; Orekhov (yellow card) 83' | Report | Sheshukov (yellow card) 27'; Strelkov 51'; Novković (yellow card) 67'; Semochko (yellow card) 68' | Stadium: Kuban Stadium; Attendance: 9,300; Referee: Aleksei Sergeyev |

| 29 September 2007 25 | Luch-Energia Vladivostok | 2 – 0 | Rubin Kazan | Vladivostok |
| 19:00 VLAT (UTC+10) | Kralevski (yellow card) 9'; Semochko 55'; R.Ajinjal (yellow card) 58'; B.Ajinjal (yellow card) 82'; Strelkov 89' | Report | Sinyov (yellow card) 10'; Calisto (yellow card) 52'; Paunović (yellow card) 57'; Petrović (yellow card) 72'; Kabze (yellow card) 74' | Stadium: Dynamo Stadium; Attendance: 10,000; Referee: Eduard Malyi |

| 7 October 2007 26 | CSKA Moscow | 4 – 0 | Luch-Energia Vladivostok | Moscow |
| 23:00 VLAT (UTC+10) | Jô 19', 65'; Vágner Love 58' (pen.); Dudu 90' | Report | Kralevski (yellow card) 57' | Stadium: Dynamo Stadium; Attendance: 3,500; Referee: Stanislav Sukhina |

| 21 October 2007 27 | Lokomotiv Moscow | 1 – 1 | Luch-Energia Vladivostok | Moscow |
| 02:00 VLAT (UTC+10) | Ivanović (yellow card) 45'; Gurenko (yellow card) 61'; Sychev 82' | Report | Gvazava 4'; Palát (yellow card) 45'; Sheshukov (yellow card) 77' | Stadium: RZD Arena; Attendance: 9,316; Referee: Yuri Klyuchnikov |

| 27 October 2007 28 | Khimki | 3 – 0 | Luch-Energia Vladivostok | Khimki |
| 21:00 VLAT (UTC+10) | Tikhonov 21' (pen.); Stepanov (yellow card) 25'; Mrđa 39', 68'; Jovanović (yellow card) 57' | Report | Gvazava (yellow card) 6'; Sheshukov (yellow card) 30' | Stadium: Rodina Stadium; Attendance: 7,200; Referee: Yuri Baskakov |

| 3 November 2007 29 | Luch-Energiya Vladivostok | 2 – 1 | Spartak Nalchik | Vladivostok |
| 21:00 VLAT (UTC+10) | Strelkov 1', 36'; R.Ajinjal (yellow card) 75' | Report | Jesus 23'; Kisenkov (yellow card) 61' | Stadium: Dynamo Stadium; Attendance: 9,800; Referee: Alexander Kolobaev |

| 11 November 2007 30 | FC Moscow | 3 – 1 | Luch-Energiya Vladivostok | Moscow |
| 21:00 VLAT (UTC+10) | Adamov 4', 85'; Stoica (yellow card) 30'; Krunić 81' | Report | Shtanyuk (yellow card) 33'; Astafyev 50' | Stadium: Eduard Streltsov Stadium; Attendance: 4,000; Referee: Stanislav Sukhina |

==== League table ====
| Pos | Team | Pld | W | D | L | GF | GA | GD | Pts | Qualification or relegation |
|---|---|---|---|---|---|---|---|---|---|---|
| 12 | Spartak Nalchik | 30 | 8 | 9 | 13 | 29 | 38 | −9 | 33 | |
| 13 | Krylia Sovetov Samara | 30 | 8 | 8 | 14 | 35 | 46 | −11 | 32 | |
| 14 | Luch-Energiya Vladivostok | 30 | 8 | 8 | 14 | 26 | 39 | −13 | 32 | |
| 15 | Kuban Krasnodar (R) | 30 | 7 | 11 | 12 | 27 | 38 | −11 | 32 | Relegation to First Division |
| 16 | Rostov (R) | 30 | 2 | 12 | 16 | 18 | 44 | −26 | 18 | Relegation to First Division |

Source: RFPL
Rules for classification: 1st points; 2nd matches won; 3rd goal difference; 4th head-to-head (points, matches won, goal difference, goals scored, away goals scored); 5th goals scored; 6th away goals scored; 7th drawing of lots
(R) Relegated

=== Russian Cup ===
==== 2007-08 ====
| 27 June 2007 Round of 32 | Metallurg Krasnoyarsk | 1 – 0 | Luch-Energiya Vladivostok | Krasnoyarsk |
| 21:30 VLAT (UTC+10) | Kunizhev (yellow card) 2' (goal) 41'; Sitdikov (yellow card) 16' (yellow-red card) 71' | Report | P.Gannesen (yellow card) 44'; A.Kasatkin (yellow card) 86' | Stadium: Central Stadium; Attendance: 5,500; Referee: Aleksandr Kabakov |

== Squad statistics ==
As of match played 11 November 2007

=== Appearances and goals ===
| No. | Pos | Nat | Player | Total | | Premier League | | 2007-08 Russian Cup | |
| No. | Pos | Nat | Player | Apps | Goals | Apps | Goals | Apps | Goals |
|---|---|---|---|---|---|---|---|---|---|
| 1 | GK | (Russia) RUS | Aleksandr Chikhradze | 5 | 0 | 5 | 0 | 0 | 0 |
| 2 | DF | (Russia) RUS | Konstantin Lobov | 9 | 0 | 4+5 | 0 | 0 | 0 |
| 3 | DF | (Ukraine) UKR | Dmytro Semochko | 25 | 1 | 25 | 1 | 0 | 0 |
| 4 | DF | (Serbia) SRB | Rade Novković | 14 | 0 | 11+2 | 0 | 1 | 0 |
| 5 | DF | (North Macedonia) MKD | Igor Kralevski | 18 | 0 | 15+3 | 0 | 0 | 0 |
| 6 | DF | (Czech Republic) CZE | Marian Palát | 4 | 0 | 4 | 0 | 0 | 0 |
| 7 | MF | (Russia) RUS | Yevgeni Kuznetsov | 6 | 0 | 1+4 | 0 | 1 | 0 |
| 9 | FW | (Belarus) BLR | Vital Lanko | 11 | 0 | 9+2 | 0 | 0 | 0 |
| 10 | FW | (Russia) RUS | Aleksandr Tikhonovetsky | 21 | 4 | 14+7 | 4 | 0 | 0 |
| 11 | MF | (Russia) RUS | Maksim Astafyev | 16 | 1 | 7+9 | 1 | 0 | 0 |
| 12 | FW | (Russia) RUS | Igor Strelkov | 13 | 5 | 9+4 | 5 | 0 | 0 |
| 13 | DF | (Belarus) BLR | Syarhey Shtanyuk | 27 | 0 | 27 | 0 | 0 | 0 |
| 14 | FW | (Russia) RUS | Semyon Melnikov | 9 | 0 | 1+7 | 0 | 1 | 0 |
| 15 | MF | (Russia) RUS | Beslan Ajinjal | 29 | 2 | 28+1 | 2 | 0 | 0 |
| 17 | MF | (Russia) RUS | Aleksandr Sheshukov | 26 | 2 | 25+1 | 2 | 0 | 0 |
| 20 | FW | (Russia) RUS | Andrei Ospeshinskiy | 7 | 0 | 1+6 | 0 | 0 | 0 |
| 21 | MF | (Russia) RUS | Ruslan Ajinjal | 27 | 0 | 27 | 0 | 0 | 0 |
| 22 | MF | (Georgia (country)) GEO | Levan Gvazava | 9 | 1 | 5+4 | 1 | 0 | 0 |
| 23 | GK | (Czech Republic) CZE | Marek Čech | 25 | 0 | 25 | 0 | 0 | 0 |
| 24 | MF | (Russia) RUS | Dmitry A. Smirnov | 15 | 0 | 13+2 | 0 | 0 | 0 |
| 25 | DF | (Ukraine) UKR | Anatoli Skvortsov | 7 | 0 | 6+1 | 0 | 0 | 0 |
| 27 | MF | (Russia) RUS | Georgi Bazayev | 25 | 4 | 18+7 | 4 | 0 | 0 |
| 28 | FW | (Serbia) SRB | Nenad Stojanović | 12 | 0 | 7+5 | 0 | 0 | 0 |
| 29 | MF | (Russia) RUS | Aleksey Arkhipov | 4 | 0 | 1+2 | 0 | 1 | 0 |
| 30 | DF | (Russia) RUS | Dmitri N. Smirnov | 24 | 1 | 23+1 | 1 | 0 | 0 |
| 32 | FW | (Russia) RUS | Viktor Fomichyov | 1 | 0 | 0 | 0 | 1 | 0 |
| 35 | DF | (Russia) RUS | Pavel Hannesen | 1 | 0 | 0 | 0 | 1 | 0 |
| 63 | FW | (Russia) RUS | Anton Kasatkin | 1 | 0 | 0 | 0 | 1 | 0 |
| 77 | MF | (Russia) RUS | Roman Voydel | 2 | 0 | 1 | 0 | 1 | 0 |
| 87 | MF | (Russia) RUS | Artyom Mikheyev | 1 | 0 | 0 | 0 | 1 | 0 |
| 90 | GK | (Russia) RUS | Kirill Muzyka | 1 | 0 | 0 | 0 | 1 | 0 |
Players away from the club on loan:
Players who appeared for Luch-Energiya Vladivostok but left during the season:
| 8 | MF | (Russia) RUS | Aleksei Ivanov | 18 | 4 | 18 | 4 | 0 | 0 |
| 33 | MF | (Russia) RUS | Denis Bolshakov | 3 | 0 | 0+2 | 0 | 1 | 0 |

=== Goal scorers ===
| Place | Position | Nation | Number | Name | Premier League | 2007-08 Russian Cup | Total |
|---|---|---|---|---|---|---|---|
| 1 | FW | (Russia) | 12 | Igor Strelkov | 5 | 0 | 5 |
| 2 | MF | (Russia) | 27 | Georgi Bazayev | 4 | 0 | 4 |
| 2 | MF | (Russia) | 8 | Aleksei Ivanov | 4 | 0 | 4 |
| 2 | FW | (Russia) | 10 | Aleksandr Tikhonovetsky | 4 | 0 | 4 |
| 5 | MF | (Russia) | 15 | Beslan Ajinjal | 2 | 0 | 2 |
| 5 | MF | (Russia) | 17 | Aleksandr Sheshukov | 2 | 0 | 2 |
| 7 | DF | (Russia) | 30 | Dmitri N. Smirnov | 1 | 0 | 1 |
| 7 | DF | (Ukraine) | 3 | Dmytro Semochko | 1 | 0 | 1 |
| 7 | MF | (Georgia (country)) | 22 | Levan Gvazava | 1 | 0 | 1 |
| 7 | MF | (Russia) | 11 | Maksim Astafyev | 1 | 0 | 1 |
| 7 | | | | Own goal | 1 | 0 | 1 |
| Total | | | | | 26 | 0 | 26 |

=== Clean sheets ===
| Place | Position | Nation | Number | Name | Premier League | 2007-08 Russian Cup | Total |
|---|---|---|---|---|---|---|---|
| 1 | GK | (Czech Republic) | 23 | Marek Čech | 8 | 0 | 8 |
| TOTALS | | | | | 8 | 0 | 8 |

=== Disciplinary record ===
| Number | Nation | Position | Name | Premier League | | 2007-08 Russian Cup | | Total | |
| Number | Nation | Position | Name | Booked | Sent off (straight red) | Booked | Sent off (straight red) | Booked | Sent off (straight red) |
|---|---|---|---|---|---|---|---|---|---|
| 2 | (Russia) | DF | Konstantin Lobov | 2 | 0 | 0 | 0 | 2 | 0 |
| 3 | (Ukraine) | DF | Dmytro Semochko | 7 | 1 | 0 | 0 | 7 | 1 |
| 4 | (Serbia) | DF | Rade Novković | 5 | 0 | 0 | 0 | 5 | 0 |
| 5 | (North Macedonia) | DF | Igor Kralevski | 6 | 0 | 0 | 0 | 6 | 0 |
| 6 | (Czech Republic) | DF | Marian Palát | 1 | 0 | 0 | 0 | 1 | 0 |
| 9 | (Belarus) | FW | Vital Lanko | 1 | 0 | 0 | 0 | 1 | 0 |
| 10 | (Russia) | FW | Aleksandr Tikhonovetsky | 4 | 0 | 0 | 0 | 4 | 0 |
| 11 | (Russia) | MF | Maksim Astafyev | 2 | 0 | 0 | 0 | 2 | 0 |
| 12 | (Russia) | FW | Igor Strelkov | 1 | 0 | 0 | 0 | 1 | 0 |
| 13 | (Belarus) | DF | Syarhey Shtanyuk | 10 | 0 | 0 | 0 | 10 | 0 |
| 15 | (Russia) | MF | Beslan Ajinjal | 6 | 0 | 0 | 0 | 6 | 0 |
| 17 | (Russia) | MF | Aleksandr Sheshukov | 6 | 0 | 0 | 0 | 6 | 0 |
| 21 | (Russia) | MF | Ruslan Ajinjal | 10 | 0 | 0 | 0 | 10 | 0 |
| 22 | (Georgia (country)) | MF | Levan Gvazava | 2 | 0 | 0 | 0 | 2 | 0 |
| 23 | (Czech Republic) | GK | Marek Čech | 1 | 0 | 0 | 0 | 1 | 0 |
| 24 | (Russia) | MF | Dmitry A. Smirnov | 3 | 0 | 0 | 0 | 3 | 0 |
| 25 | (Ukraine) | DF | Anatoli Skvortsov | 2 | 0 | 0 | 0 | 2 | 0 |
| 27 | (Russia) | MF | Georgi Bazayev | 2 | 0 | 0 | 0 | 2 | 0 |
| 30 | (Russia) | DF | Dmitri N.Smirnov | 2 | 0 | 0 | 0 | 2 | 0 |
| 35 | (Russia) | DF | Pavel Hannesen | 0 | 0 | 1 | 0 | 1 | 0 |
| 63 | (Russia) | FW | Anton Kasatkin | 0 | 0 | 1 | 0 | 1 | 0 |
Players away on loan:
Players who left Luch-Energiya Vladivostok during the season:
| 8 | (Russia) | MF | Aleksei Ivanov | 1 | 0 | 0 | 0 | 1 | 0 |
| Total | | | | 74 | 1 | 2 | 0 | 76 | 1 |
