= Vladimir Merkulov =

Vladimir Merkulov may refer to:

- Vladimir Merkulov (pilot) (1922-2003), Soviet flying ace
- Vladimir Merkulov (athlete) (born 1989), Russian professional football player
