= Merkulov =

Merkulov, or Merkoulov (masculine, Russian: Меркулов) or Merkulova (feminine, Russian: Меркулова) is a Russian surname.

== People with the surname Merkulov ==
=== People in aviation ===
- Vladimir Merkulov (pilot) (1922–2003), Soviet flying ace

=== People in culture ===
- Yuri Merkulov (1901–1979), Soviet artist, one of the founders of the Soviet school of animation

=== People in sports ===
- Robert Merkulov (1931–2022), former Soviet speed skater
- Nina Merkulova (born 1945), former Soviet alpine skier
- Yulia Merkulova (born 1984), Russian volleyball-player
- Vladimir Merkulov (athlete) (born 1989), Russian professional football-player
- Mikhail Merkulov (born 1994), Russian professional football-player
- Alexandra Merkulova (born 1995), Russian rhythmic gymnast
- Georgii Merkulov (born 2000), Russian professional ice hockey-player

=== People in politics ===
- Vsevolod Merkulov (1895–1953), Soviet politician and head of the NKGB
