= Adzhindzhal =

Adzhindzhal is a surname. Notable people with the surname include:

- Beslan Adzhindzhal (born 1974), Russian footballer and coach
- Ruslan Adzhindzhal (born 1974), Russian footballer and coach, identical twin brother of Beslan
