= Aleksei Sergeyev =

Aleksei Sergeyev may refer to:

- Aleksei Alekseyevich Sergeyev (1930-2001), Soviet and Russian politician who ran for vice-president in the 1991 Russian presidential election <!-; see ru:Сергеев, Алексей Алексеевич-->
- Aleksei Ivanovich Sergeyev, Russian politician, vice-governor of St. Petersburg as of 2009
- Aleksei Sergeyev (ice hockey), Russian hockey player who participated in the 2009 Men's Hockey Champions Challenge II
- Aleksei Sergeyev (referee), Russian football referee who officiated in the Russian Cup 2008–09
- Aleksei Sergeyev (footballer) (born 1979), Russian footballer
- Alexei Sergeev Soloist of the Alexandrov Ensemble
