= Igor Strelkov =

Igor Strelkov may refer to:

- Igor Strelkov (footballer) (born 1982), Russian footballer
- Igor Girkin (born 1970), Russian military commander nicknamed "Strelkov"
