= Bazayev =

Bazayev (Cyrillic: Базаев) is a surname. Notable people with that name include:

- Assan Bazayev (born 1981), Kazakhstani xylist
- Dzhambulad Bazayev (born 1979), Russian Ossetian footballer
- Georgi Bazayev (born 1978), Russian footballer.

== See also ==
- Shamil Basayev (1965-2006), Chechen guerrilla leader
