= Dmitri Kabanov =

Dmitri Kabanov may refer to:

- Dmitri Kabanov (footballer) (born 1985), Russian footballer
- Dmitri Kabanov (judoka) (born 1980), Russian judoka
