= Aleksandr Petukhov =

Aleksandr Petukhov may refer to:

- Aleksandr Petukhov (footballer, born 1980), Russian football forward
- Aleksandr Petukhov (footballer, born 1985), Kazakhstani football goalkeeper
