= Vitali Timofeyev =

Russian footballer

Personal information
- Full name: Vitali Valeryevich Timofeyev
- Date of birth: 4 February 1982 (age 44)
- Place of birth: Novocherkassk, Russian SFSR
- Height: 1.76 m (5 ft 9 1/2 in)
- Position: Defender

Youth career
- 1996–1999: Nika Krasny Sulin

Senior career*
| Years | Team | Apps | (Gls) |
| 2000–2002 | SKA Rostov-on-Don | 77 | (15) |
| 2003 | Lisma-Mordovia Saransk | 32 | (1) |
| 2004 | Rotor Volgograd | 1 | (0) |
| 2004–2005 | Mordovia Saransk | 59 | (4) |
| 2006 | Dynamo Makhachkala | 39 | (3) |
| 2007–2010 | Baltika Kaliningrad | 108 | (6) |
| 2007 | → Shakhtyor Soligorsk (loan) | 12 | (1) |
| 2011 | Luch-Energiya Vladivostok | 16 | (0) |
| 2011–2012 | Khimki | 20 | (0) |
| 2012–2013 | Vityaz Podolsk | 21 | (2) |
| 2013–2014 | Sokol Saratov | 24 | (4) |
| 2014–2015 | Zenit Izhevsk | 24 | (4) |
| 2015–2017 | Baltika Kaliningrad | 37 | (0) |
- * Club domestic league appearances and goals

Vitali Valeryevich Timofeyev (Russian: Виталий Валерьевич Тимофеев; born 4 February 1982) is a former Russian professional footballer.

== Club career ==
He made his debut in the Russian Premier League in 2004 for FC Khimki.
