= Anatoli Skvortsov =

Ukrainian-Russian footballer (born 1976)

Personal information
- Full name: Anatoli Aleksandrovich Skvortsov
- Date of birth: 24 November 1976 (age 49)
- Place of birth: Sevastopol, Ukrainian SSR
- Height: 1.81 m (5 ft 11 1/2 in)
- Position: Midfielder

Team information
- Current team: FC TSK Simferopol (youth coach)

Senior career*
Years	Team	Apps	(Gls)
1994	MPKC Mozyr	8	(1)
1995–1996	Chaika Sevastopol	43	(4)
1997	Tavriya Simferopol	1	(0)
1998	Chornomorets Sevastopol	20	(8)
1999	Tavriya Simferopol	5	(0)
1999	Chornomorets Sevastopol	12	(1)
2000–2006	Spartak Nalchik	218	(12)
2007	Shinnik Yaroslavl	20	(1)
2007	Luch-Energiya Vladivostok	7	(0)
2008	Chernomorets Novorossiysk	32	(1)
2009	Sevastopol	10	(0)

Managerial career
- 2009–2015: Sevastopol (reserves)
- 2015: Kafa Feodosia
- * Club domestic league appearances and goals

Anatoli Aleksandrovich Skvortsov (Russian: Анатолий Александрович Скворцов; born 24 November 1976) is a Ukrainian and Russian professional football coach and former player.
