= Louis Udoh =

Nigerian-Russian footballer

Personal information
- Date of birth: 25 August 1974 (age 52)
- Place of birth: Lagos, Nigeria
- Height: 1.73 m (5 ft 8 in)
- Position: Defender

Senior career*
Years	Team	Apps	(Gls)
1996–1997	SV Braunau	11	(0)
1997–1998	FC Admira Wacker Mödling	12	(0)
1998–2000	SV Braunau		
2000–2001	FC Chernomorets Novorossiysk	5	(0)
2000	→ FC Chernomorets-d Novorossiysk (loan)	4	(0)
2002	did not play		
2003–2004	FC SKA-Energiya Khabarovsk	37	(2)
2006	FC Azovets Primorsko-Akhtarsk		
2006	FC Dynamo Makhachkala	18	(0)
2007–2012	FC Rubin Novolokinskaya		
- * Club domestic league appearances and goals

Louis Udoh (Russian: Луис Удо; born 25 August 1974 in Lagos) is a former Nigerian football player. He also holds Russian citizenship.
