= Kirill Muzyka =

Russian footballer

Personal information
- Full name: Kirill Aleksandrovich Muzyka
- Date of birth: 22 November 1990 (age 35)
- Height: 1.84 m (6 ft 1/2 in)
- Position: Goalkeeper

Senior career*
Years	Team	Apps	(Gls)
2006–2011	FC Luch-Energiya Vladivostok	0	(0)
2009–2010	→ FC Tekstilshchik Ivanovo (loan)	16	(0)
2010–2011	→ FC Mostovik-Primorye Ussuriysk (loan)	8	(0)
2012–2016	FC Yakutiya Yakutsk	83	(0)
- * Club domestic league appearances and goals

Kirill Aleksandrovich Muzyka (Russian: Кирилл Александрович Музыка; born 22 November 1990) is a former Russian professional football player.

== Club career ==
He made his professional debut for FC Luch-Energiya Vladivostok on 27 June 2007 in the Russian Cup game against FC Metallurg Krasnoyarsk. He also appeared in the next Russian Cup season on 6 August 2008 against FC Baltika Kaliningrad.
