= Kirill Makarov =

Russian footballer

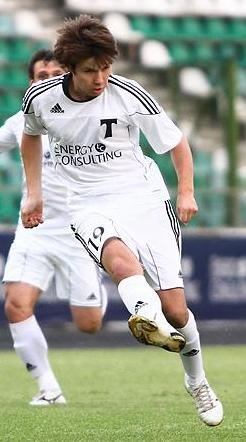

Personal information
- Full name: Kirill Dmitriyevich Makarov
- Date of birth: 7 January 1987 (age 39)
- Place of birth: Leningrad, Russian SFSR
- Height: 1.72 m (5 ft 7 1/2 in)
- Position: Forward

Senior career*
Years	Team	Apps	(Gls)
2005	FC Zenit-2 St. Petersburg	29	(9)
2006	FC Luch-Energiya Vladivostok	1	(0)
2006–2007	FC Khimki	11	(0)
2007	FC Metallurg-Kuzbass Novokuznetsk	26	(1)
2008	FC Zenit-2 St. Petersburg	34	(10)
2009	FC FSA Voronezh	27	(12)
2010	FC Torpedo Moscow	15	(3)
2010	FC Sokol Saratov	9	(0)
2011–2012	FC Metallurg-Kuzbass Novokuznetsk	17	(2)
2013	FC Piter Saint Petersburg	9	(1)
2013	FC Rus Saint Petersburg	11	(1)
- * Club domestic league appearances and goals

Kirill Dmitriyevich Makarov (Russian: Кирилл Дмитриевич Макаров; born 7 January 1987) is a former Russian professional footballer.

== Club career ==
He made his debut in the Russian Premier League in 2006 for FC Luch-Energiya Vladivostok.
