= Roman Romanov (footballer, born 1981) =

Russian footballer

Personal information
- Full name: Roman Nikolayevich Romanov
- Date of birth: 5 February 1981 (age 45)
- Place of birth: Volzhsky, Russian SFSR, Soviet Union
- Height: 1.86 m (6 ft 1 in)
- Position: Defender

Senior career*
Years	Team	Apps	(Gls)
1998–2000	FC Rotor-2 Volgograd	40	(2)
2000–2004	FC Rotor Volgograd	80	(1)
2005	FC Zenit-2 St. Petersburg	16	(1)
2006	FC Luch-Energiya Vladivostok	1	(0)
2007–2008	FC Zenit-2 St. Petersburg	2	(0)
2009	FC Energiya Volzhsky	0	(0)

International career
2000–2002	Russia U-21	7	(0)
- * Club domestic league appearances and goals

Roman Nikolayevich Romanov (Russian: Роман Николаевич Романов; born 5 February 1981) is a Russian former professional footballer.

== Club career ==
He made his professional debut in the Russian Second Division in 1998 for FC Rotor-2 Volgograd.

He made his Russian Premier League debut for FC Rotor Volgograd on 29 July 2000 in a game against FC Lokomotiv Moscow.
