= Rade Novković =

Serbian footballer (born 1980)

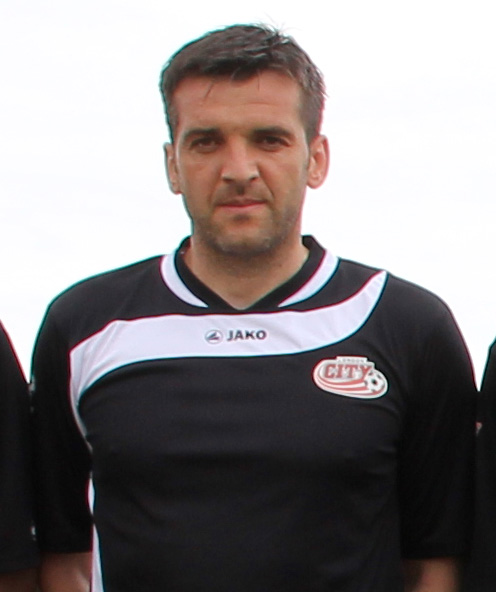
- Novković in 2012

Personal information
- Date of birth: June 25, 1980 (age 46)
- Place of birth: Prijepolje, SFR Yugoslavia
- Height: 1.87 m (6 ft 1 1/2 in)
- Position: Defender

Senior career*
Years	Team	Apps	(Gls)
2001–2003	Jedinstvo Ub	50	(3)
2004–2007	Rad	93	(4)
2007–2009	Luch-Energiya	51	(2)
2010	Sloboda Sevojno	2	(0)
2011–2012	Brantford Galaxy	27	(1)
2012–2015	London City		
- * Club domestic league appearances and goals

Rade Novković (Serbian Cyrillic: Раде Новковић; born June 25, 1980) is a Serbian retired football defender who played in the Second League of FR Yugoslavia, First League of Serbia and Montenegro, Russian Premier League, Serbian SuperLiga, and the Canadian Soccer League.

== Playing career ==
Novković began his career with FK Jedinstvo Ub in the Second League of FR Yugoslavia. In 2004, he moved up to the First League of Serbia and Montenegro to play with FK Rad. In 2007, he went abroad to Russia to sign with FC Luch-Energiya Vladivostok of the Russian Premier League, where he played 51 matches and recorded two goals. He returned to Serbia in 2010 to play in the Serbian SuperLiga with FK Sloboda Point Sevojno.

In 2011, he went overseas to Canada to sign with Brantford Galaxy of the Canadian Soccer League. The following year he was transferred to rivals London City. In 2013, he helped London secure a postseason for the first time since the 2000 CPSL season by finishing seventh in the overall standings. He featured in the quarterfinal match against York Region Shooters, where London won in a penalty shootout. In the next round London faced Kingston FC, but suffered a 4-2 defeat. He concluded his career with London in 2015.
