= Stanislav Khan =

Russian footballer

Personal information
- Full name: Stanislav Eduardovich Khan
- Date of birth: July 1, 1987 (age 39)
- Place of birth: Tashkent, Uzbek SSR
- Height: 1.75 m (5 ft 9 in)
- Position: Midfielder

Youth career
- Tapoich Tashkent

Senior career*
Years	Team	Apps	(Gls)
2004–2005	FC Sokol Saratov	50	(3)
2006	FC Dynamo Makhachkala	25	(3)
2007	FC Chernomorets Novorossiysk	20	(0)
2008	Dinaburg FC	9	(1)
2009	FC Mashuk-KMV Pyatigorsk	30	(2)
2010	FC Dynamo Kirov	9	(1)
2011–2012	FC Torpedo Armavir	26	(0)
2012	FC Zenit Penza	10	(1)
2013	FC Spartak Kostroma	17	(1)
2014	FC Vologda	10	(0)
2014	FC TSK Simferopol	0	(0)
- * Club domestic league appearances and goals

Stanislav Eduardovich Khan (Russian: Станислав Эдуардович Хан; born 1 July 1987) is a former Russian professional footballer.

== Club career ==
He made his Russian Football National League debut for FC Sokol Saratov on 15 August 2004 in a game against FC SKA-Energiya Khabarovsk. He played two more seasons in the FNL for Sokol and FC Dynamo Makhachkala.
