= Nail Minibayev =

Russian footballer and coach

Personal information
- Full name: Nail Girfanovich Minibayev
- Date of birth: 16 March 1985 (age 41)
- Place of birth: Tolyatti, Russian SFSR
- Height: 1.85 m (6 ft 1 in)
- Position: Defender

Team information
- Current team: FS Galaxy Tolyatti (coach)

Youth career
- FC Lada-Tolyatti

Senior career*
Years	Team	Apps	(Gls)
2003	FC Lada-Tolyatti	0	(0)
2003	FC Vityaz Podolsk	12	(0)
2004–2005	FC Saturn Moscow Oblast	0	(0)
2005	FC Lada-Tolyatti	12	(0)
2006	FC Luch-Energiya Vladivostok	0	(0)
2006	FC Kuban Krasnodar	0	(0)
2007	FC Zenit Chelyabinsk	13	(0)
2008–2009	FC Lada-Tolyatti	35	(1)
2010	FC Metallurg-Yenisey Krasnoyarsk	9	(0)

International career
2004	Russia U21	1	(0)

Managerial career
- 2018–: FS Galaxy Tolyatti
- * Club domestic league appearances and goals

Nail Girfanovich Minibayev (Russian: Наиль Гирфанович Минибаев; born 16 March 1985) is a Russian professional football coach and a former player. He works as a coach with Galaxy Tolyatti football school.

== Club career ==
He made his debut for FC Luch-Energiya Vladivostok on 2 July 2006 in a Russian Cup Round of 32 game against FC Dynamo Makhachkala. On 20 September 2006, he appeared in the second leg of the same stage of the same competition for FC Kuban Krasnodar in a game against PFC Krylia Sovetov Samara.
