= Aleksandr Chikhradze =

Russian footballer and coach

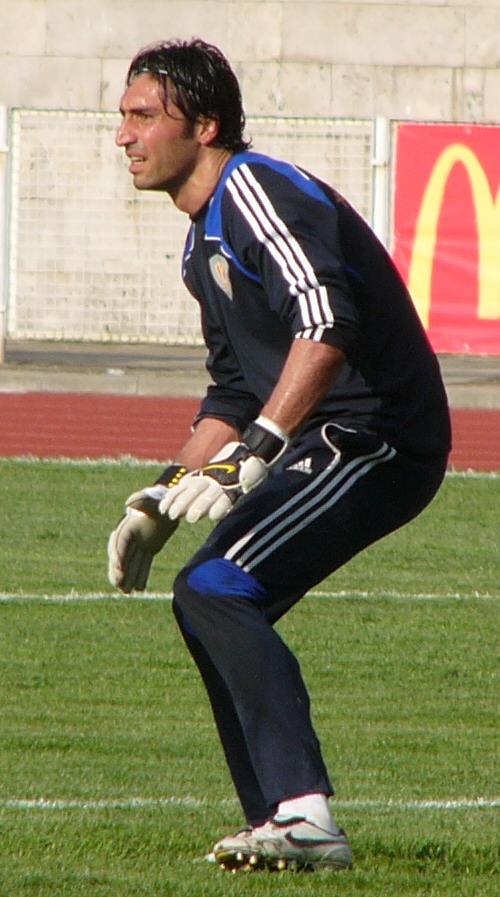

Personal information
- Full name: Aleksandr Lvovich Chikhradze
- Date of birth: 17 August 1975 (age 51)
- Place of birth: Nalchik, Russian SFSR
- Height: 1.88 m (6 ft 2 in)
- Position: Goalkeeper

Team information
- Current team: FC Fakel Voronezh (GK coach)

Senior career*
Years	Team	Apps	(Gls)
1993	FC Avtozapchast Baksan	33	(0)
1994	PFC CSKA-d Moscow	19	(0)
1995–1996	FC Avtozapchast Baksan	34	(0)
1997–1998	PFC Spartak Nalchik	20	(0)
1999–2001	FC Dinamo Tbilisi	10	(0)
2001–2003	PFC Spartak Nalchik	27	(0)
2003	FC Kavkazkabel Prokhladny	6	(0)
2004–2006	PFC Spartak Nalchik	108	(0)
2007–2008	FC Luch-Energiya Vladivostok	5	(0)
2008	FC MVD Rossii Moscow	16	(0)
2009–2010	FC Zhemchuzhina Sochi	48	(0)
2011–2012	FC Chernomorets Novorossiysk	37	(0)
2012–2013	FC Gazovik Orenburg	19	(0)
Total		382	(0)

Managerial career
- 2014–2016: FC Lokomotiv Moscow (reserves GK coach)
- 2017–2020: FC Armavir (GK coach)
- 2021–2023: FC Fakel Voronezh (GK coach)
- 2023–2024: FC Chayka Peschanokopskoye (GK coach)
- 2024–: FC Fakel Voronezh (GK coach)
- * Club domestic league appearances and goals

Aleksandr Lvovich Chikhradze (Russian: Александр Львович Чихрадзе, born 17 August 1975) is a Russian football coach and a former football goalkeeper of Georgian origin who is the goalkeepers' coach with FC Fakel Voronezh.

He was born in Nalchik, and spent much of his career at PFC Spartak Nalchik.

== Honours ==
- Russian Second Division, Zone South best goalkeeper: 2009.
