= Maksim Avramov =

Russian footballer

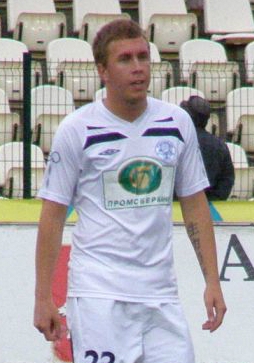

Personal information
- Full name: Maksim Aleksandrovich Avramov
- Date of birth: 2 July 1987 (age 39)
- Height: 1.81 m (5 ft 11 in)
- Position: Defender

Senior career*
| Years | Team | Apps | (Gls) |
| 2004 | SDYuShOR Zenit Saint Petersburg | | |
| 2005 | FC Zenit-2 Saint Petersburg | 28 | (1) |
| 2006 | FC Luch-Energiya Vladivostok | 0 | (0) |
| 2006 | FC Saturn Ramenskoye | 0 | (0) |
| 2007 | FC Metallurg-Kuzbass Novokuznetsk | 3 | (0) |
| 2008 | FC Zenit-2 Saint Petersburg | 15 | (1) |
| 2009 | FC Avangard Podolsk | 4 | (0) |
| 2010 | FC Nevsky Front Saint Petersburg | | |
| 2011 | FC Rusfan Saint Petersburg | | |
| 2012 | FC Nevsky Front Saint Petersburg | | |
- * Club domestic league appearances and goals

Maksim Aleksandrovich Avramov (Russian: Максим Александрович Аврамов; born 2 July 1987) is a former Russian professional football player.

== Club career ==
He made his debut for FC Luch-Energiya Vladivostok on 2 July 2006 in a Russian Cup game against FC Dynamo Makhachkala.

He played in the Russian Football National League for FC Metallurg-Kuzbass Novokuznetsk in 2007.
