= Marián Palát =

Czech footballer (born 1977)

Personal information
- Date of birth: 1 June 1977 (age 49)
- Place of birth: Czechoslovakia
- Height: 1.86 m (6 ft 1 in)
- Position: Defender

Senior career*
Years	Team	Apps	(Gls)
2000–2001	Bohemians 1905	8	(0)
2004–2007	Mladá Boleslav	72	(7)
2007–2008	Vladivostok	4	(0)
2008–2009	Ružomberok		
2009	Viktoria Žižkov	5	(0)
- * Club domestic league appearances and goals

Marián Palát (born 1 June 1977) is a retired Czech football defender. Previously he played in Russia for FC Luch-Energia Vladivostok. Prior to that he played for FK Mladá Boleslav, helping the club reach the third qualifying round of the 2006–07 UEFA Champions League.
