= Vladimir Kazakov =

Russian footballer

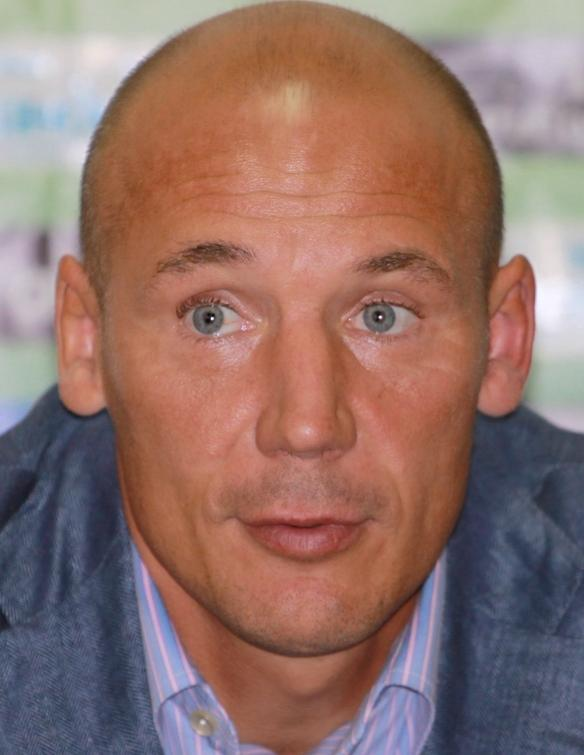

Personal information
- Full name: Vladimir Valeryevich Kazakov
- Date of birth: 26 November 1972 (age 53)
- Place of birth: Murom, Russian SFSR
- Height: 1.70 m (5 ft 7 in)
- Positions: Midfielder; defender

Team information
- Current team: FC Nizhny Novgorod (assistant coach)

Youth career
- FC Dynamo Murom

Senior career*
Years	Team	Apps	(Gls)
1988–1990	FC Dynamo Vologda	80	(5)
1991	FC Zarya Kaluga	35	(4)
1992–1997	FC Lokomotiv Nizhny Novgorod	158	(12)
1998	FC Shinnik Yaroslavl	21	(1)
1999–2000	FC Torpedo Moscow	54	(2)
2001–2002	FC Uralan Elista	57	(9)
2003	FC Torpedo-Metallurg Moscow	13	(0)
2004	FC Uralan Elista	33	(3)
2005–2006	FC Luch-Energiya Vladivostok	48	(10)
2007	FC Shinnik Yaroslavl	33	(1)
2008	FC Nizhny Novgorod	12	(3)
2010	FC Nizhny Novgorod	7	(0)

Managerial career
- 2008: FC Nizhny Novgorod (assistant)
- 2009: FC Khimik Dzerzhinsk
- 2010: FC Nizhny Novgorod (director of sports)
- 2011: FC Nizhny Novgorod
- 2012: FC Lokomotiv-2 Moscow
- 2013: FC Torpedo Moscow
- 2014: FC Torpedo Vladimir (assistant)
- 2015–2016: FC Tosno (assistant)
- 2016–2017: FC Krylia Sovetov Samara (U-21)
- 2017–2018: FC Krylia Sovetov-2 Samara
- 2018–2020: FC Murom
- 2020–2021: FC Tom Tomsk (assistant)
- 2021–: FC Nizhny Novgorod (assistant)
- * Club domestic league appearances and goals

Vladimir Valeryevich Kazakov (Russian: Владимир Валерьевич Казаков; born 26 November 1970) is a Russian professional football coach and a former player. He is an assistant coach with FC Nizhny Novgorod.

== Club career ==
As a player, he made his debut in the Soviet Second League in 1988 for FC Dynamo Vologda.

== Honours ==
- Russian Premier League bronze: 2000.
- Russian First Division best defender: 2005.

== European club competitions ==
- UEFA Intertoto Cup 1997 with FC Lokomotiv Nizhny Novgorod: 2 games.
- UEFA Intertoto Cup 1998 with FC Shinnik Yaroslavl: 2 games.
- UEFA Cup 2000–01 with FC Torpedo Moscow: 2 games.
