= Artyom Beketov =

Russian professional footballer

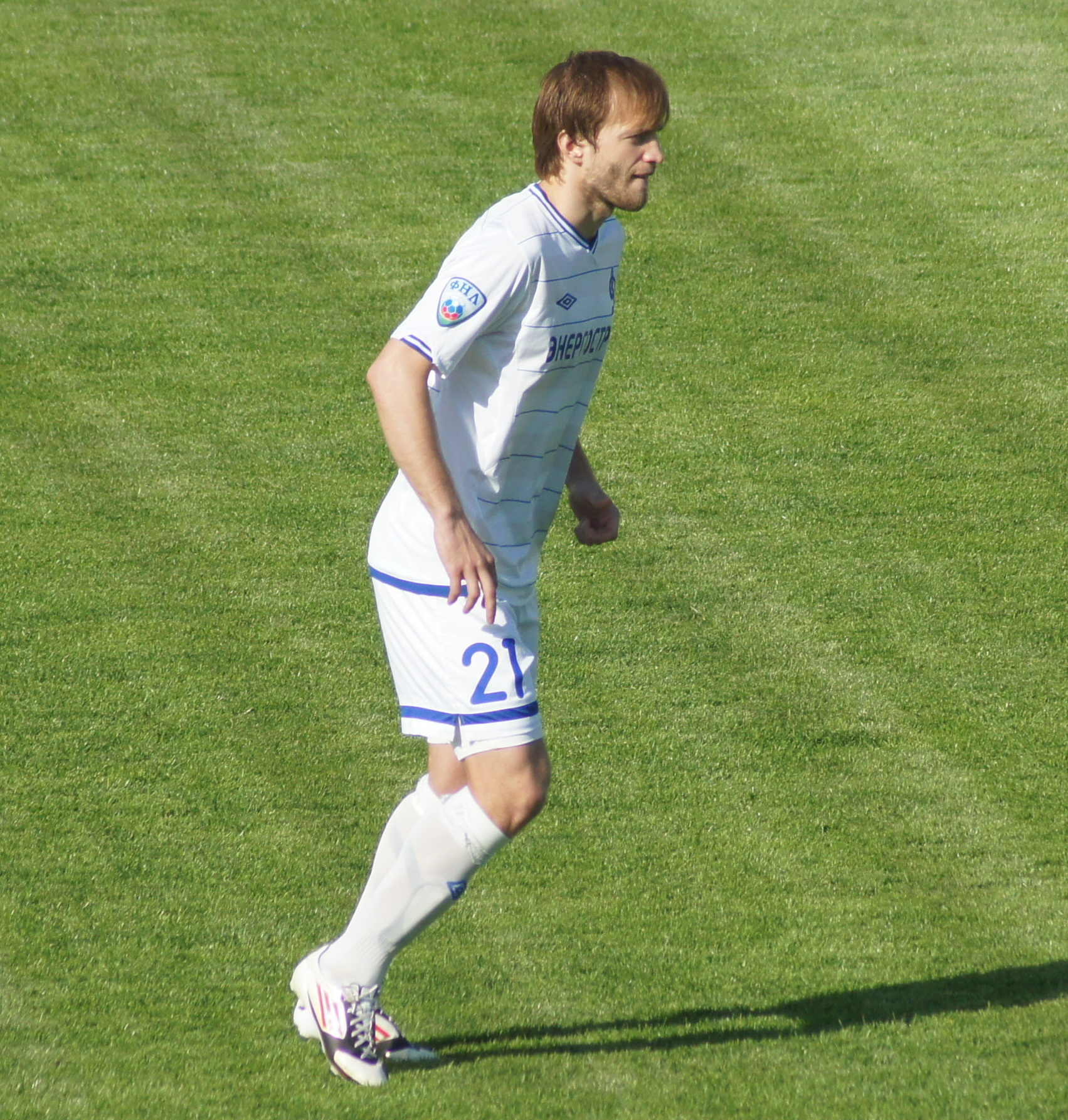
- Artyom Beketov in 2012

Personal information
- Full name: Artyom Viktorovich Beketov
- Date of birth: 12 June 1984 (age 42)
- Place of birth: Dushanbe, Tajik SSR, Soviet Union
- Height: 1.77 m (5 ft 10 in)
- Position: Midfielder

Youth career
- FC Chernomorets Novorossiysk

Senior career*
Years	Team	Apps	(Gls)
2001–2004	FC Chernomorets Novorossiysk	13	(1)
2004–2006	FC Luch-Energiya Vladivostok	47	(2)
2008	FC Chernomorets Novorossiysk	38	(2)
2009	FC Salyut-Energia Belgorod	26	(1)
2010–2011	FC Krasnodar	1	(0)
2011–2012	FC Dynamo Bryansk	16	(0)
2012–2013	FC Volgar Astrakhan	16	(2)
2013	FC Salyut Belgorod	29	(3)
2014–2016	FC Fakel Voronezh	56	(4)
2016–2017	FC Armavir	39	(0)
- * Club domestic league appearances and goals

Artyom Viktorovich Beketov (Russian: Артём Викторович Бекетов; born 12 June 1984) is a Russian former professional footballer.

== Club career ==
He made his debut in the Russian Premier League in 2006 for FC Luch-Energiya Vladivostok.
