= Sergey Kuznetsov (footballer, born 1986) =

Russian footballer

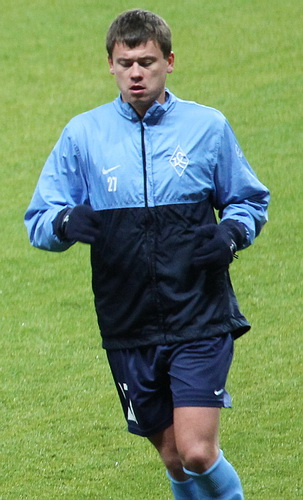

Personal information
- Full name: Sergey Gennadyevich Kuznetsov
- Date of birth: 7 May 1986 (age 40)
- Place of birth: Oryol, Soviet Union
- Height: 1.80 m (5 ft 11 in)
- Position: Midfielder

Youth career
- 2002: FC Nika Moscow
- 2003: FC Saturn Ramenskoye

Senior career*
Years	Team	Apps	(Gls)
2004	FC Luch-Energiya Vladivostok	15	(1)
2005	FC Dynamo Moscow	14	(0)
2006–2008	FC Lokomotiv Moscow	0	(0)
2006	→ FC Luch-Energiya Vladivostok (loan)	2	(0)
2007	→ FC Krylia Sovetov Samara (loan)	9	(0)
2008	→ FC Kuban Krasnodar (loan)	38	(6)
2009	FC Rostov	6	(0)
2010–2011	FC Khimki	19	(5)
2010–2011	→ FC Krylia Sovetov Samara (loan)	27	(2)
2012–2013	FC Mordovia Saransk	16	(0)
2013–2015	FC Arsenal Tula	44	(4)
2015–2017	FC Tom Tomsk	41	(9)
2018	FC Rotor Volgograd	8	(1)

International career
2007	Russia U-21	3	(0)
- * Club domestic league appearances and goals

Sergey Gennadyevich Kuznetsov (Russian: Сергей Геннадьевич Кузнецов; born 7 May 1986) is a former Russian football player.

== Club career ==
He made his debut in the Russian Premier League in 2005 for FC Dynamo Moscow.
