= Aleksandr Cherkes =

Russian footballer

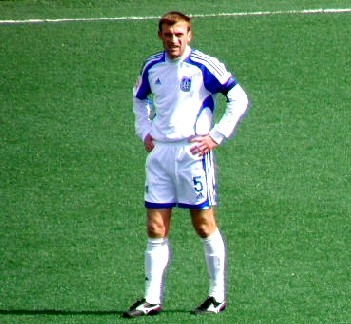

Personal information
- Full name: Aleksandr Alekseyevich Cherkes
- Date of birth: 2 September 1976 (age 50)
- Place of birth: Voronezh, Soviet Union (now Russia)
- Height: 1.80 m (5 ft 11 in)
- Position: Defender

Senior career*
Years	Team	Apps	(Gls)
1998	FC Gazovik Ostrogozhsk		
1999	FC Lokomotiv Liski	16	(0)
1999–2001	FC Fakel Voronezh	53	(0)
2002	FC Sokol Saratov	27	(1)
2003	FC Chernomorets Novorossiysk	24	(0)
2004	FC Sokol Saratov	30	(0)
2005–2006	FC Luch-Energiya Vladivostok	67	(2)
2007–2008	FC Shinnik Yaroslavl	44	(2)
2008–2010	FC Rostov	36	(0)
2011	FC Fakel Voronezh	11	(0)
2011	FC Nizhny Novgorod	17	(0)
2012	FC Lokomotiv-2 Moscow	8	(0)

Managerial career
- 2013: FC Fakel Voronezh (director of sports)
- 2014: FC Vybor-Kurbatovo Voronezh (assistant)
- 2018–2019: FC Rostov II (assistant)
- 2019: FC Rostov II (assistant)
- * Club domestic league appearances and goals

Aleksandr Alekseyevich Cherkes (Russian: Александр Алексеевич Черкес; born 2 September 1976) is a Russian football coach and a former player.

== Playing career ==
He made his debut in the Russian Premier League in 2000 for FC Fakel Voronezh.

On 17 June 2008, Cherkes signed a 2.5-year contract with FC Rostov.

== Personal life ==
His son Yevgeni Cherkes is now a professional footballer.
