= Andrei Ospeshinskiy =

Russian footballer

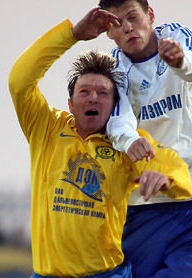

Personal information
- Full name: Andrei Igorevich Ospeshinskiy
- Date of birth: 26 September 1979 (age 47)
- Place of birth: Moscow, Russian SFSR
- Height: 1.86 m (6 ft 1 in)
- Position: Striker

Youth career
- 1986: FC Moskvich Moscow
- 1990: SDYuSShOR #63 Smena Moscow

Senior career*
Years	Team	Apps	(Gls)
1996	FC Smena Moscow	9	(0)
2000–2001	FC Saturn Ramenskoye	21	(0)
2001–2004	FC Uralan Elista	80	(10)
2004–2005	FC Khimki	29	(5)
2006–2007	FC Luch-Energiya Vladivostok	32	(2)
2009	FC MVD Rossii-2 Moscow		
- * Club domestic league appearances and goals

Andrei Igorevich Ospeshinskiy (Russian: Андрей Игоревич Оспешинский; born 26 September 1979) is a former Russian professional footballer.

== Club career ==
He made his professional debut in the Russian Third League in 1996 for FC Smena Moscow.

== Honours ==
- Russian Cup finalist: 2005.
