= Dmytro Semochko =

Ukrainian footballer

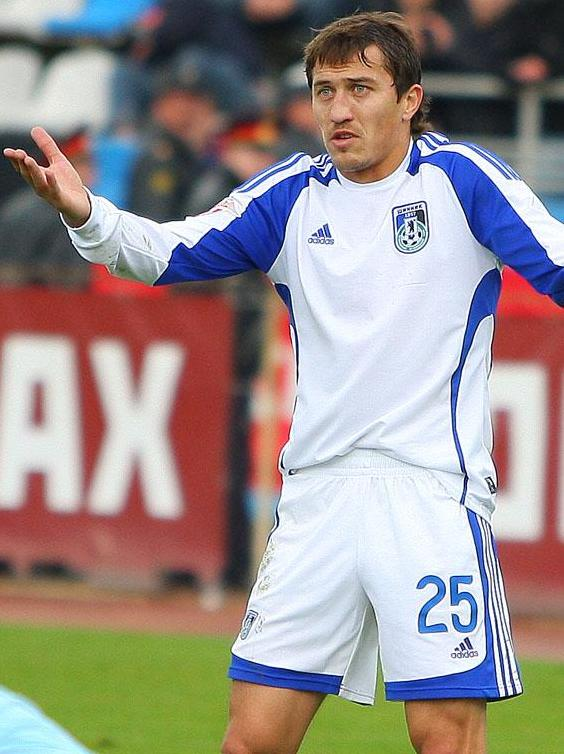
- Semochko in 2008

Personal information
- Full name: Dmytro Dmytrovich Semochko
- Date of birth: 25 January 1979 (age 47)
- Place of birth: Lavrykiv, Lviv Oblast, Ukrainian SSR, Soviet Union
- Height: 1.78 m (5 ft 10 in)
- Position: Defender

Youth career
- Karpaty Lviv

Senior career*
Years	Team	Apps	(Gls)
1997–1999	FC Lviv	86	(19)
1998–1999	→ Karpaty Lviv (loan)	15	(2)
1999	→ Karpaty-2 Lviv (loan)	4	(0)
2000–2003	Uralan Elista	105	(8)
2003–2006	Dnipro Dnipropetrovsk	38	(3)
2004	→ Dnipro-2 Dnipropetrovsk	2	(0)
2006–2007	Luch-Energiya Vladivostok	52	(2)
2008	Shinnik Yaroslavl	27	(0)
2009	Metalist Kharkiv	9	(0)
2009	Khimki	10	(0)
2010	Zakarpattia Uzhhorod	1	(0)
2010	Volyn Lutsk	1	(0)
2010	Nizhny Novgorod	13	(0)
2011–2012	Luch-Energiya Vladivostok	36	(1)
2013–2015	Luch-Energiya Vladivostok	50	(0)
- * Club domestic league appearances and goals

Dmytro Dmytrovych Semochko (Ukrainian: Дмитро Дмитрович Семочко, Russian: Дмитрий Дмитриевич Семочко, romanized: Dmitry Dmitrievich Semochko; born 25 January 1979) is a Ukrainian former professional footballer who played as a defender. He played in the Ukrainian Premier League with Karpaty Lviv, Dnipro Dnipropetrovsk and Metalist Kharkiv and in the Russian Premier League with Uralan Elista, FC Luch Vladivostok and Shinnik Yaroslavl.

== Career ==
Semochko began his football career in Ukraine, playing as a striker for FC Lviv and Karpaty Lviv. In 2000, he moved abroad joining Russian Premier League side Uralan Elista, where he was expected to be a top performer. However, the club finished bottom of the league, suffering a 9–0 defeat to Lokomotiv Moscow during the process. Semochko stayed with Uralan as the club secured an immediate return to the Russian Premier League. He scored the first Russian Premier League goal at the Lokomotiv Stadium, an own goal in FC Elista's 1–0 loss to FC Lokomotiv Moscow on 5 July 2002.
