= Aleksandr Petukhov (footballer, born 1980) =

Russian footballer

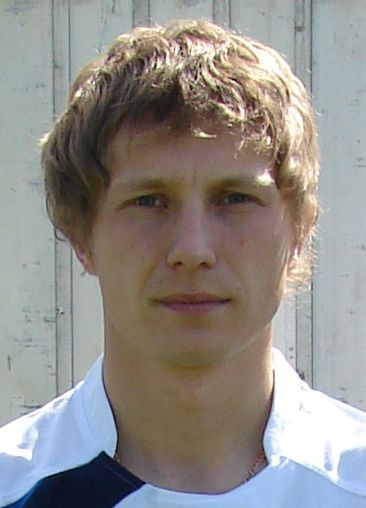

Personal information
- Full name: Aleksandr Aleksandrovich Petukhov
- Date of birth: 25 April 1980 (age 46)
- Place of birth: Leningrad, Russian SFSR
- Height: 1.82 m (5 ft 11 1/2 in)
- Position: Forward

Senior career*
Years	Team	Apps	(Gls)
1997–2001	FC Zenit St. Petersburg (reserves)	87	(30)
1999–2001	FC Zenit St. Petersburg	25	(4)
2002–2005	FC Metallurg Lipetsk	127	(67)
2005–2006	FC Luch-Energiya Vladivostok	20	(2)
2007	FC Dynamo St. Petersburg	11	(3)
2007	FC Tekstilshchik-Telekom Ivanovo	8	(3)
2008	FC Tobol	26	(5)
2009–2012	FC Sever Murmansk	111	(36)
2013	FC Karelia Petrozavodsk	3	(2)
2013–2014	FC Tosno	26	(5)
2014–2015	FC Dynamo Saint Petersburg	23	(1)

International career
1999	Russia U-21	1	(0)
- * Club domestic league appearances and goals

Aleksandr Aleksandrovich Petukhov (Russian: Александр Александрович Петухов; born 25 April 1980) is a Russian former professional football player.

== Club career ==
He made his debut in the Russian Premier League in 1999 for FC Zenit St. Petersburg.

Petukhov played for FC Metallurg Lipetsk in the Russian First Division and Russian Second Division from 2002 until 2005.

== International career ==
In his only game for Russia national under-21 football team against Ukraine on 9 October 1999, Petukhov was a part of a very rare four-players substitution chain. Magomed Adiyev was substituted at half-time by Sergei Osipov, who then was substituted by Petukhov with 13 minutes left in the game due to injury, and then Petukhov was substituted himself 11 minutes later, as coach Leonid Pakhomov was trying to run out the clock and used the substitution on Petukhov as he was the youngest player in the game. Pakhomov apologized to Petukhov for substituting him.

== Honours ==
- Russian Premier League bronze: 2001.
- Russian Cup winner: 1999.
- Russian Second Division Zone Center top scorer: 2002 (32 goals).

== European club competitions ==
- UEFA Cup 1999–2000 with FC Zenit St. Petersburg: 2 games.
- UEFA Intertoto Cup 2000 with FC Zenit St. Petersburg: 3 games, 1 goal.
