= Artyom Mikheyev =

Russian footballer (born 1987)

Personal information
- Full name: Artyom Olegovich Mikheyev
- Date of birth: 28 October 1987 (age 38)
- Height: 1.73 m (5 ft 8 in)
- Position: Midfielder

Senior career*
Years	Team	Apps	(Gls)
2005–2013	FC Luch-Energiya Vladivostok	70	(2)
2011	→ FC Mostovik-Primorye Ussuriysk (loan)	6	(0)
2012	→ FC Smena Komsomolsk-na-Amure (loan)	7	(0)
2013–2014	FC Smena Komsomolsk-na-Amure	19	(2)
- * Club domestic league appearances and goals

Artyom Olegovich Mikheyev (Russian: Артём Олегович Михеев; born 28 October 1987) is a Russian former footballer.

== Club career ==
He made his debut in the Russian Premier League for Luch-Energiya on 2 November 2008 in a game against FC Amkar Perm.
