= Dmitri Kabanov (footballer) =

Russian footballer

Personal information
- Full name: Dmitri Aleksandrovich Kabanov
- Date of birth: 12 December 1985 (age 40)
- Height: 1.84 m (6 ft 1/2 in)
- Position: Defender

Senior career*
| Years | Team | Apps | (Gls) |
| 2005–2007 | FC Luch-Energiya Vladivostok | 0 | (0) |
| 2007 | FC Amur Blagoveshchensk | 12 | (1) |
| 2008–2009 | FC Okean Nakhodka | 28 | (0) |
| 2011 | FC Vladrybport Vladivostok | | |
- * Club domestic league appearances and goals

Dmitri Aleksandrovich Kabanov (Russian: Дмитрий Александрович Кабанов; born 12 December 1985) is a former Russian professional football player.

== Club career ==
He made his debut for FC Luch-Energiya Vladivostok on 2 July 2006 in the Russian Cup game against FC Dynamo Makhachkala.
