= Igor Strelkov (footballer) =

Russian footballer

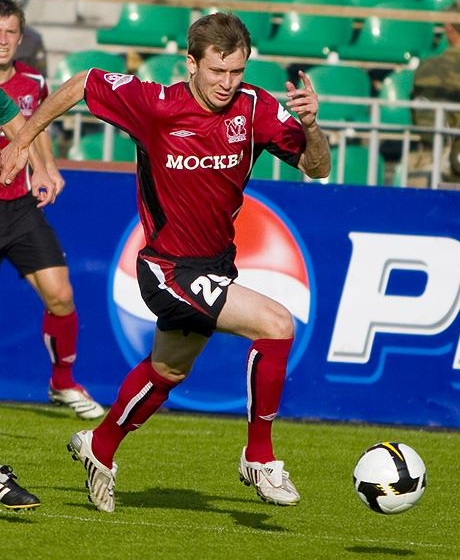
- Igor Strelkov in 2008

Personal information
- Full name: Igor Sergeyevich Strelkov
- Date of birth: 21 March 1982 (age 44)
- Place of birth: Tolyatti, Kuybyshev Oblast, Soviet Union
- Height: 1.82 m (5 ft 11 1/2 in)
- Position: Striker

Senior career*
| Years | Team | Apps | (Gls) |
| 1998–2000 | FC Lada Togliatti | 25 | (6) |
| 2001–2002 | FC Shakhtar Donetsk | 4 | (1) |
| 2001–2002 | → FC Shakhtar-2 Donetsk | 27 | (7) |
| 2002 | FC Lada Togliatti | 13 | (0) |
| 2003–2004 | FC Anzhi Makhachkala | 54 | (10) |
| 2005 | FC Lada Togliatti | 34 | (22) |
| 2006 | FC Kuban Krasnodar | 43 | (12) |
| 2007 | FC Luch-Energiya Vladivostok | 13 | (5) |
| 2008 | FC Tom Tomsk | 10 | (3) |
| 2008–2009 | FC Moscow | 32 | (1) |
| 2010 | FC Krylia Sovetov Samara | 8 | (1) |
| 2010 | → FC Anzhi Makhachkala (loan) | 13 | (1) |
| 2011–2012 | FC Luch-Energiya Vladivostok | 9 | (0) |
- * Club domestic league appearances and goals

Igor Sergeyevich Strelkov (Russian: Игорь Серге́евич Стрелков; born 21 March 1982) is a former Russian footballer.
