= Aleksei Sergeyev (footballer) =

Russian footballer

Personal information
- Full name: Aleksei Sergeyevich Sergeyev
- Date of birth: 5 August 1979 (age 47)
- Place of birth: Chaykovsky, Perm Krai, Russian SFSR
- Height: 1.86 m (6 ft 1 in)
- Position: Defender

Senior career*
Years	Team	Apps	(Gls)
1999–2001	FC Energiya Chaikovsky	68	(2)
2001–2004	FC Gazovik-Gazprom Izhevsk	76	(1)
2005–2006	FC Nosta Novotroitsk	41	(3)
2007	FC Gazovik Orenburg	13	(0)
2008	FC Gornyak Uchaly	26	(0)
2009	FC Tyumen	8	(0)
2009–2010	FC Bashinformsvyaz-Dynamo Ufa	34	(1)
2011–2012	FC Khimik Dzerzhinsk	36	(2)
- * Club domestic league appearances and goals

Aleksei Sergeyevich Sergeyev (Russian: Алексей Серге́евич Сергеев; born 5 August 1979) is a former Russian professional football player.

== Club career ==
He played 4 seasons in the Russian Football National League for FC Gazovik-Gazprom Izhevsk.
