= Aleksey Arkhipov =

Russian footballer

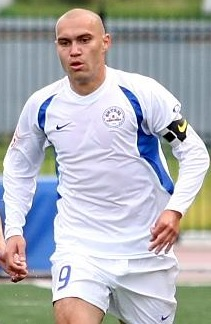
- Aleksey Arkhipov in 2009

Personal information
- Full name: Aleksey Alekseyevich Arkhipov
- Date of birth: 24 March 1983 (age 43)
- Place of birth: Moscow, Russian SFSR
- Height: 1.84 m (6 ft 1/2 in)
- Position: Midfielder

Team information
- Current team: FC Vityaz Podolsk

Youth career
- 1990–1999: SDYuShOR #63 Smena Moscow
- 1999–2001: FC Dynamo Moscow

Senior career*
Years	Team	Apps	(Gls)
2001–2004	FC Dynamo Moscow	1	(0)
2004–2007	FC Luch-Energiya Vladivostok	63	(5)
2008–2009	FC Vityaz Podolsk	44	(7)
2010	FC Krasnodar	0	(0)
2010	→ FC Shinnik Yaroslavl (loan)	12	(1)
2011–2013	FC Vityaz Podolsk	53	(8)
- * Club domestic league appearances and goals

Aleksey Alekseyevich Arkhipov (Russian: Алексей Алексеевич Архипов; born 24 March 1983) is a former Russian footballer.
