= Stanislav Reznikov =

Russian footballer

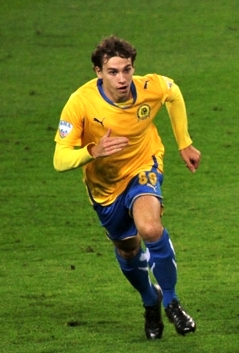
- Reznikov in 2011.

Personal information
- Full name: Stanislav Viktorovich Reznikov
- Date of birth: 8 April 1986 (age 40)
- Place of birth: Novorossiysk, Russian SFSR
- Height: 1.72 m (5 ft 8 in)
- Positions: Midfielder; defender

Youth career
- FC Chernomorets Novorossiysk

Senior career*
Years	Team	Apps	(Gls)
2003	FC Chernomorets Novorossiysk	1	(0)
2004	→ FC Saturn Ramenskoye (loan)	0	(0)
2005–2006	FC Luch-Energiya Vladivostok	10	(0)
2007–2008	→ FC Nosta Novotroitsk (loan)	42	(1)
2009	FC Shinnik Yaroslavl	34	(5)
2010–2011	FC Baltika Kaliningrad	48	(2)
2011–2013	FC Luch-Energiya Vladivostok	35	(0)
2014–2015	FC Nosta Novotroitsk	33	(2)
2016	FC Sakhalin Yuzhno-Sakhalinsk	0	(0)
2016–2019	FC Chernomorets Novorossiysk	84	(10)

International career
2006	Russia U-20	7	(1)
- * Club domestic league appearances and goals

Stanislav Viktorovich Reznikov (Russian: Станислав Ви́кторович Ре́зников; born 8 April 1986) is a Russian former professional footballer.

== Club career ==
He made his debut in the Russian Premier League in 2003 for FC Chernomorets Novorossiysk.

On 7 June 2019, Russian Football Union banned him from football activity for three years after he allegedly accepted a bribe for ensuring that his team FC Chernomorets Novorossiysk lost to FC Chayka Peschanokopskoye.
