= Vladimir Merkulov (pilot) =

Soviet fighter pilot during WW II

- Владимир Иванович Меркулов
- Born: 28 December 1922; Pogorelovo, Oryol Governorate, RSFSR
- Died: 26 November 2003 (aged 80); Kiev, Ukraine
- Military career
- Allegiance: Soviet Union
- Branch: Soviet Air Force
- Service years: 1940—1979
- Rank: General-lieutenant of aviation
- Conflicts: World War II
- Awards: Hero of the Soviet Union

Vladimir Ivanovich Merkulov (Russian: Владимир Иванович Меркулов; 28 December 1922 – 26 November 2003) was a Soviet fighter pilot and flying ace during World War II. Awarded the title Hero of the Soviet Union on 26 October 1944 for his initial victories, by the end of the war his tally reached 29 solo and four shared shootdowns.
