= Vladimir Merkulov (athlete) =

Russian footballer

Personal information
- Full name: Vladimir Igorevich Merkulov
- Date of birth: 9 June 1989 (age 37)
- Height: 1.73 m (5 ft 8 in)
- Position: Striker

Senior career*
Years	Team	Apps	(Gls)
2006–2007	FC Luch-Energiya Vladivostok	0	(0)
2009	FC Luch-Energiya Vladivostok	1	(0)
2010	FC Okean Nakhodka	16	(1)
2011	FC Primregionfond Vladivostok		
- * Club domestic league appearances and goals

Vladimir Igorevich Merkulov (Russian: Владимир Игоревич Меркулов; born 9 June 1989) is a former Russian professional football player.

== Club career ==
He played in the Russian Football National League for FC Luch-Energiya Vladivostok in 2009.
