= Beslan Ajinjal =

Russian footballer

Beslan Ajinjal Беслан Аџьынџьал
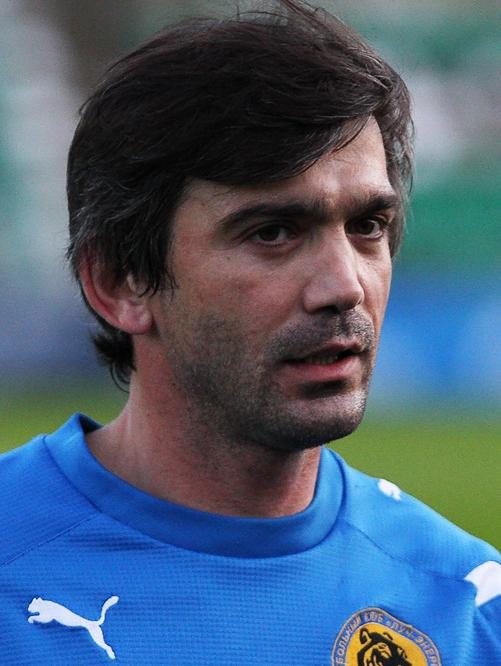
- Adzhindzhal with Luch-Energiya in 2011

Personal information
- Full name: Beslan Alekseyevich Ajinjal
- Date of birth: 22 June 1974 (age 52)
- Place of birth: Gagra, Georgia SSR
- Height: 1.68 m (5 ft 6 in)
- Position: Midfielder

Senior career*
Years	Team	Apps	(Gls)
1991	Dinamo Gagra		
1991	FC Dinamo Sukhumi	17	(0)
1992–1993	FC Druzhba Maykop	62	(6)
1994–1999	FC Baltika Kaliningrad	195	(16)
2000–2001	FC Torpedo-ZIL Moscow	49	(4)
2001–2003	FC Torpedo Moscow	41	(5)
2003–2004	FC Sokol Saratov	55	(19)
2005–2007	FC Luch-Energiya Vladivostok	96	(9)
2008	FC Tom Tomsk	5	(0)
2008	FC Kuban Krasnodar	18	(0)
2009	FC Shinnik Yaroslavl	31	(0)
2010	FC Torpedo Moscow	27	(2)
2011–2012	FC Luch-Energiya Vladivostok	46	(3)
Total		642	(64)

Managerial career
- 2017–2019: FC Baltika Kaliningrad (youth dev. director)
- 2018–2019: Abkhazia
- 2023–2024: FC Druzhba Maykop
- * Club domestic league appearances and goals

Beslan Alekseyevich Ajinjal (Abkhaz: Беслан Аџьынџьал, Russian: Беслан Алексеевич Аджинджал, born 22 June 1974) is a Russian football coach and a former player from Abkhazia.

== Club career ==
Ajinjal started his career at football club at Abkhaz ASSR. After Georgia declared independence in 1991, both brothers left for the Russian club FC Druzhba Maykop.

== Coaching career ==
Ajinjal is currently manager of Abkhazia.

== Personal life ==
He is an identical twin brother of Ruslan Ajinjal.

== Honours ==
- Russian First Division best midfielder: 2004.
- Russian Second Division Zone Centre best midfielder: 2010.
