= Georgi Bazayev =

Russian footballer

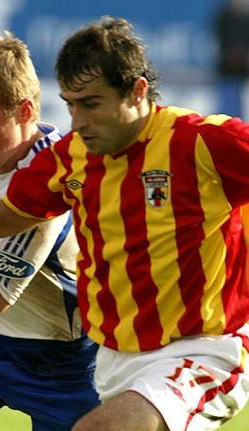
- Georgi Bazayev in 2005

Personal information
- Full name: Georgi Vasilyevich Bazayev
- Date of birth: 26 August 1978 (age 48)
- Place of birth: Rustavi, Soviet Union (now Georgia)
- Height: 1.74 m (5 ft 8 1/2 in)
- Position: Midfielder

Youth career
- FC Alania Vladikavkaz

Senior career*
Years	Team	Apps	(Gls)
1996–1997	FC Spartak Anapa	63	(18)
1998	FC Kuban Krasnodar	30	(3)
1999	FC Vityaz Krymsk	28	(9)
2000–2001	FC Avtodor Vladikavkaz	55	(8)
2001–2006	FC Alania Vladikavkaz	119	(16)
2006–2008	FC Luch-Energiya Vladivostok	52	(9)
2008–2010	FC Alania Vladikavkaz	37	(6)
2011–2012	FC Luch-Energiya Vladivostok	7	(0)
- * Club domestic league appearances and goals

Georgi Vasilyevich Bazayev (Russian: Георгий Васильевич Базаев; born 26 August 1978) is a Russian former professional footballer.

== Club career ==
He made his debut in the Russian Premier League in 2001 for FC Alania Vladikavkaz.

== Personal life ==
He is the brother of Jambulad Bazayev.
