= 2003 FC Spartak Moscow season =

Spartak Moscow
2003 season
- Manager: Oleg Romantsev (until June); Andrey Chernyshov (June–September); Vladimir Fedotov (Caretaker) (from September)
- Stadium: Luzhniki Stadium
- Premier League: 10th
- Russian Cup: Champions
- Russian Cup: Round of 32 vs Kuban Krasnodar
- UEFA Cup: Progressed to 2004 season
- Top goalscorer: League: Roman Pavlyuchenko (10); All: Roman Pavlyuchenko (14)

The 2003 FC Spartak Moscow season was the club's 12th season in the Russian Premier League season. Spartak finished the season in 10th position, qualifying for the 2004 UEFA Intertoto Cup. In the Russian Cup, Spartak won the 2002–03 cup, whilst they were knocked out of the 2003–04 cup at the Round of 32 stage by Kuban Krasnodar. In Europe, Spartak reached the Third Round of the UEFA Cup which also took place during the 2004 season.

== Season events ==
On 7 November, Wojciech Kowalewski made his loan move from Shakhtar Donetsk permanent by signing a five-year contract with Spartak.

== Squad ==
As of match played 27 November 2003

No.	Name	Nationality	Position	Date of birth (age)	Signed from	Signed in	Contract ends	Apps.	Goals
Goalkeepers
1	Szabolcs Sáfár	(Hungary)	GK	20 August 1974 (aged 29)	Austria Salzburg	2003	2005	5	0
22	Abdelillah Bagui	(Morocco)	GK	17 February 1978 (aged 25)	MAS Fez	2003		7	0
30	Wojciech Kowalewski	(Poland)	GK	11 May 1977 (aged 26)	loan from Shakhtar Donetsk	2003	2008	16	0
44	Aleksandr Nevokshonov	(Russia)	GK	29 December 1984 (aged 18)	Shinnik Yaroslavl	2003		0	0
46	Aleksei Zuev	(Russia)	GK	3 February 1981 (aged 22)	Spartak-Zvezda Shchyolkovo	2001			
	Giorgi Lomaia	(Georgia (country))	GK	8 August 1979 (aged 24)	Locomotive Tbilisi	2003		0	0
Defenders
2	Yuri Kovtun	(Russia)	DF	5 January 1970 (aged 33)	Dynamo Moscow	1999	2005		
3	Ibra Kébé	(Senegal)	DF	24 December 1978 (aged 24)	ASC Jeanne d'Arc	2001			
4	Moisés Moura	(Brazil)	DF	25 July 1979 (aged 24)	Paraná	2002		56	2
5	Vladyslav Vashchuk	(Ukraine)	DF	2 January 1975 (aged 28)	Dynamo Kyiv	2003		29	1
17	Russo	(Brazil)	DF	16 June 1976 (aged 27)	Vasco da Gama	2003		2	0
18	Dmytro Parfenov	(Ukraine)	DF	11 September 1974 (aged 29)	Dnipro Dnipropetrovsk	1998	2005		
19	Igor Mitreski	(North Macedonia)	DF	19 February 1979 (aged 24)	Sileks	2001			
20	Aleksandr Belozyorov	(Russia)	DF	27 October 1981 (aged 22)	Lada-Tolyatti	2003		7	1
27	Luizão	(Brazil)	DF	11 November 1980 (aged 23)	loan from Juventus-SP	2003	2003	22	0
35	Kamalutdin Akhmedov	(Russia)	DF	14 April 1986 (aged 17)	Youth Team	2003		0	0
43	Vadim Karlashchuk	(Russia)	DF	30 July 1984 (aged 19)	Shinnik Yaroslavl	2003		0	0
	Sergei Kabanov	(Russia)	DF	15 March 1986 (aged 17)	Youth Team	2002		0	0
Midfielders
6	Goran Trobok	(Serbia and Montenegro)	MF	6 September 1974 (aged 29)	Partizan	2003		14	0
9	Yegor Titov	(Russia)	MF	29 May 1976 (aged 27)	Youth Team	1995		321	81
11	Danijel Hrman	(Croatia)	MF	7 August 1975 (aged 28)	NK Varteks	2003	2005 (+1)	6	0
13	Srđan Stanić	(Serbia and Montenegro)	MF	7 June 1982 (aged 21)	OFK Beograd	2003	2007	13	1
14	Maksym Kalynychenko	(Ukraine)	MF	26 January 1979 (aged 24)	Dnipro Dnipropetrovsk	2000		92	14
21	Artyom Bezrodny	(Russia)	MF	10 February 1979 (aged 24)	Bayer Leverkusen	1998			
25	Aleksandr Pavlenko	(Russia)	MF	20 January 1985 (aged 18)	Lausanne-Sport	2001		47	4
26	Aleksandr Sheshukov	(Russia)	MF	15 April 1983 (aged 20)	Spartak Tambov	2002		5	0
32	Mikhail Kostin	(Russia)	MF	10 March 1985 (aged 18)	Youth Team	2003		0	0
33	Maksim Demenko	(Russia)	MF	21 March 1976 (aged 27)	Rostselmash	2003		22	0
39	Aleksei Rebko	(Russia)	MF	23 April 1986 (aged 17)	Youth Team	2001		2	0
40	Aleksandr Samedov	(Russia)	MF	19 July 1984 (aged 19)	Youth Team	2001		8	0
41	Dmitri Torbinski	(Russia)	MF	28 April 1984 (aged 19)	Youth Team	2001		17	0
45	Oleg Ivanov	(Russia)	MF	4 August 1986 (aged 17)	Youth Team	2002		0	0
Forwards
8	Aleksandr Danishevsky	(Russia)	FW	23 February 1984 (aged 19)	Youth Team	2001			
10	Roman Pavlyuchenko	(Russia)	FW	15 December 1981 (aged 21)	Rotor Volgograd	2003		34	14
23	Raman Vasilyuk	(Belarus)	FW	23 November 1978 (aged 25)	Slavia Mozyr	2001			
24	Nikolai Sokolov	(Russia)	FW	18 January 1983 (aged 20)	Lokomotiv Moscow	2003			
28	Mihajlo Pjanović	(Serbia and Montenegro)	FW	13 February 1977 (aged 26)	Red Star Belgrade	2003	2007	12	5
34	Artem Kontsevoy	(Belarus)	FW	20 May 1983 (aged 20)	BATE Borisov	2003		10	2
37	Tarmo Kink	(Estonia)	FW	6 October 1985 (aged 18)	Real Tallinn	2003		2	0
Away on loan
15	Valeri Abramidze	(Georgia (country))	DF	17 January 1980 (aged 23)	Torpedo Kutaisi	2002	2006	21	0
	Maksim Kabanov	(Russia)	GK	30 December 1982 (aged 20)	Youth Team	2001			
	Marcelo Silva	(Brazil)	MF	25 May 1976 (aged 27)	Santos	2002	2004	5	0
	Goran Maznov	(North Macedonia)	FW	22 April 1981 (aged 22)	Sloga Jugomagnat	2001			
	Pavel Pogrebnyak	(Russia)	FW	8 November 1983 (aged 20)	Youth Team	2002		2	0
	Aleksandr Sonin	(Russia)	FW	6 August 1983 (aged 20)	Saint-Étienne	2001			
Players that left Spartak Moscow during the season
6	Dmitry A. Smirnov	(Russia)	MF	13 August 1980 (aged 23)	Torpedo-ZIL Moscow	2003		19	2
7	Vasili Baranov	(Belarus)	MF	5 October 1972 (aged 31)	Baltika Kaliningrad	1998	2004		
11	Oleh Pestryakov	(Ukraine)	MF	5 August 1974 (aged 29)	loan from Shakhtar Donetsk	2003	2003	3	0
17	Robert	(Brazil)	FW	27 February 1981 (aged 22)	loan from São Caetano	2003	2003	11	2
24	Andrei Streltsov	(Russia)	MF	18 March 1984 (aged 19)	Youth Team	2001			
28	André Dias	(Brazil)	FW	11 March 1981 (aged 22)	loan from Juventus-SP	2003	2003	2	0
42	Okon Flo Essien	(Nigeria)	FW	31 December 1981 (aged 21)	Dolphins	2001			
	Andrejs Rubins	(Latvia)	MF	26 November 1978 (aged 25)	Crystal Palace	2003		0	0
	Guim	(Brazil)	FW	3 April 1977 (aged 26)	loan from Paulista	2003	2003		

=== On loan ===
Note: Flags indicate national team as defined under FIFA eligibility rules; some limited exceptions apply. Players may hold more than one non-FIFA nationality.

No.	Pos.	Nation	Player
15	DF	GEO	Valeri Abramidze (at Uralan Elista)
—	GK	RUS	Maksim Kabanov (at Fakel-Voronezh)
—	MF	BRA	Marcelo Silva (at Atlético Mineiro)

No.	Pos.	Nation	Player
—	FW	MKD	Goran Maznov (at Baltika Kaliningrad)
—	FW	RUS	Pavel Pogrebnyak (at Baltika Kaliningrad)
—	FW	RUS	Aleksandr Sonin (at Arsenal Kyiv)

=== Left club during season ===
Note: Flags indicate national team as defined under FIFA eligibility rules; some limited exceptions apply. Players may hold more than one non-FIFA nationality.

No.	Pos.	Nation	Player
6	MF	RUS	Dmitry A. Smirnov (to Chernomorets Novorossiysk)
17	FW	BRA	Robert (loan return to São Caetano)
24	MF	RUS	Andrei Streltsov (to Rubin Kazan)
28	FW	BRA	André Dias (loan return to Juventus-SP)

No.	Pos.	Nation	Player
42	FW	NGR	Okon Flo Essien (to Dolphins)
—	MF	LAT	Andrejs Rubins (to Shinnik Yaroslavl)
—	FW	BRA	Guim (loan return to Paulista)

== Transfers ==
=== In ===
Date	Position	Nationality	Name	From	Fee	Ref.
Winter 2003	DF	(Ukraine)	Vladyslav Vashchuk	Dynamo Kyiv	Undisclosed	
Winter 2003	MF	(Latvia)	Andrejs Rubins	Crystal Palace	Undisclosed	
Winter 2003	MF	(Russia)	Maksim Demenko	Rostselmash	Undisclosed	
Winter 2003	MF	(Russia)	Dmitry A. Smirnov	Torpedo-ZIL Moscow	Undisclosed	
Winter 2003	MF	(Serbia and Montenegro)	Goran Trobok	Partizan	Undisclosed	
Winter 2003	FW	(Belarus)	Artem Kontsevoy	BATE Borisov	Undisclosed	
Winter 2003	FW	(Russia)	Roman Pavlyuchenko	Rotor Volgograd	Undisclosed	
March 2003	GK	(Morocco)	Abdelillah Bagui	MAS Fez	Undisclosed	
16 June 2003	GK	(Hungary)	Szabolcs Sáfár	Austria Salzburg	Undisclosed	
5 July 2003	FW	(Estonia)	Tarmo Kink	Real Tallinn	Undisclosed	
8 July 2003	MF	(Croatia)	Danijel Hrman	NK Varteks	Undisclosed	
8 July 2003	MF	(Serbia and Montenegro)	Srđan Stanić	OFK Beograd	Undisclosed	
18 August 2003	FW	(Serbia and Montenegro)	Mihajlo Pjanović	Red Star Belgrade	Undisclosed	
27 August 2003	DF	(Brazil)	Russo	Vasco da Gama	Undisclosed	
Summer 2003	GK	(Georgia (country))	Giorgi Lomaia	Locomotive Tbilisi	Undisclosed	
Summer 2003	GK	(Russia)	Aleksandr Nevokshonov	Shinnik Yaroslavl	Undisclosed	
Summer 2003	DF	(Russia)	Aleksandr Belozyorov	Lada-Tolyatti	Undisclosed	
Summer 2003	DF	(Russia)	Vadim Karlashchuk	Shinnik Yaroslavl	Undisclosed	
7 November 2003	GK	(Poland)	Wojciech Kowalewski	Shakhtar Donetsk	Undisclosed	

=== Loans in ===
Date from	Position	Nationality	Name	From	Date to	Ref.
13 March 2003	MF	(Ukraine)	Oleh Pestryakov	Shakhtar Donetsk	July 2003	
14 March 2003	DF	(Brazil)	Luizão	Juventus-SP	End of Season	
14 March 2003	FW	(Brazil)	André Dias	Juventus-SP	Summer 2003	
14 March 2003	FW	(Brazil)	Guim	Paulista	Summer 2003	
14 March 2003	FW	(Brazil)	Robert	São Caetano	Summer 2003	
June 2003	GK	(Poland)	Wojciech Kowalewski	Shakhtar Donetsk	End of the Season	

=== Out ===
Date	Position	Nationality	Name	To	Fee	Ref.
Winter 2003	MF	(Latvia)	Andrejs Rubins	Shinnik Yaroslavl	Undisclosed	
Winter 2003	FW	(Russia)	Vladimir Beschastnykh	Fenerbahçe	Undisclosed	
Winter 2003	FW	(Russia)	Dmitri Sychev	Marseille	Undisclosed	
Summer 2003	MF	(Belarus)	Vasili Baranov	Spartak-Alania Vladikavkaz	Undisclosed	
Summer 2003	MF	(Russia)	Dmitry A. Smirnov	Chernomorets Novorossiysk	Undisclosed	
Summer 2003	MF	(Russia)	Andrei Streltsov	Rubin Kazan	Undisclosed	
Summer 2003	FW	(Nigeria)	Okon Flo Essien	Dolphins	Undisclosed	

=== Loans out ===
Date from	Position	Nationality	Name	To	Date to	Ref.
Winter 2002	GK	(Russia)	Maksim Kabanov	Fakel Voronezh	End of Season	
Winter 2003	MF	(Brazil)	Marcelo Silva	Bahia		
Winter 2003	MF	(Brazil)	Marcelo Silva	Atlético Mineiro	End of Season	
Winter 2003	FW	(North Macedonia)	Goran Maznov	Baltika Kaliningrad	End of Season	
Winter 2003	FW	(Russia)	Pavel Pogrebnyak	Baltika Kaliningrad	End of Season	
Winter 2002	FW	(Russia)	Aleksandr Sonin	Dynamo-2 Kyiv	Summer 2003	
Summer 2003	DF	(Georgia (country))	Valeri Abramidze	Uralan Elista	End of Season	
Summer 2003	FW	(Russia)	Aleksandr Sonin	Arsenal Kyiv	End of Season	

=== Released ===
Date	Position	Nationality	Name	Joined	Date
31 December 2003	GK	(Hungary)	Szabolcs Sáfár	Austria Wien	
31 December 2003	GK	(Morocco)	Abdelillah Bagui	Khimki	
31 December 2003	GK	(Russia)	Maksim Kabanov	Torpedo Moscow	
31 December 2003	DF	(Brazil)	Moisés Moura	Krylia Sovetov	
31 December 2003	DF	(Brazil)	Russo	Sport Recife	
31 December 2003	DF	(Georgia (country))	Valeri Abramidze	Khimki	
31 December 2003	DF	(Ukraine)	Vladyslav Vashchuk	Chornomorets Odesa	
31 December 2003	DF	(Russia)	Aleksandr Belozyorov	Chernomorets Novorossiysk	
31 December 2003	MF	(Russia)	Artyom Bezrodny		
31 December 2003	MF	(Russia)	Maksim Demenko		

== Competitions ==
=== Premier League ===
==== Results by round ====
Round	1	2	3	4	5	6	7	8	9	10	11	12	13	14	15	16	17	18	19	20	21	22	23	24	25	26	27	28	29	30
Ground	A	H	A	H	A	H	A	H	A	H	A	A	H	A	H	A	H	A	H	H	A	H	A	H	A	H	A	H	A	H
Result	D	L	L	D	W	D	L	W	D	W	L	L	L	L	W	W	W	L	L	W	L	L	W	W	L	D	W	D	L	L

Updated to match(es) played on 1 November 2003. Source: See Results
A = Away; H = Home; W = Win; D = Draw; L = Loss

==== Results ====
15 May 2003 1	Torpedo-Metallurg Moscow	0 – 0	Spartak Moscow	Moscow
16:00 MSK (UTC+3)	Khlestov (yellow card) 59'; Rekhviashvili (yellow card) 61' (yellow-red card) 70'; Kazakov (yellow card) 69'; Katić (yellow card) 81'	Report	Kovtun (red card) 63'	Stadium: Eduard Streltsov Stadium; Attendance: 9,500; Referee: Yuri Baskakov

23 March 2003 2	Spartak Moscow	1 – 2	Spartak-Alania Vladikavkaz	Moscow
17:00 MSK (UTC+3)	Pavlyuchenko 34'	Report	Miholaps 20'; Bazayev 65'; Pagayev (yellow card) 87'	Stadium: Eduard Streltsov Stadium; Attendance: 7,000; Referee: Sergey Lapochkin

6 April 2003 3	CSKA Moscow	3 – 2	Spartak Moscow	Moscow
16:00 MSK (DST) (UTC+4)	Rahimić (yellow card) 12'; Laizāns (yellow card) 35'; Semak 49'; Gusev 77' (pen.); Yanovsky (yellow card) 86'; Jarošík 90'	Report	Vashchuk (yellow card) 9'; Titov 33'; Pinheiro (yellow card) 47'; V.Berezutski 57' (o.g.)	Stadium: Dynamo Stadium; Attendance: 26,000; Referee: Valentin Ivanov

13 April 2003 4	Spartak Moscow	1 – 1	Krylia Sovetov	Moscow
17:00 MSK (DST) (UTC+4)	Kovtun (yellow card) 35'; Baranov 64'; Vashchuk (yellow card) 66'	Report	Karyaka 2'; Gaúcho (yellow card) 24'; Souza (yellow card) 90+'	Stadium: Eduard Streltsov Stadium; Attendance: 9,700; Referee: Stanislav Sukhina

19 April 2003 5	Uralan Elista	1 – 2	Spartak Moscow	Elista
18:00 MSK (DST) (UTC+4)	Morquio (yellow card) 25'; Geraschenko (yellow card) 43'; Kolodin (yellow card) 49'; Semochko (yellow card) 58'; Luizão 79' (o.g.); Vranješ (yellow card) 86'; Passoni (yellow card) 87'	Report	Titov 38'; Pavlyuchenko 45'; Kovtun (yellow card) 75'; Luizão (yellow card) 85'	Stadium: Uralan Stadium; Attendance: 7,000; Referee: Aleksandr Gvardis

23 April 2003 6	Spartak Moscow	1 – 1	Zenit St.Petersburg	Moscow
17:00 MSK (DST) (UTC+4)	Pavlyuchenko (yellow card) 16'; Pavlenko 27'; Luizão (yellow card) 36'; Kébé (yellow card) 60'	Report	Spivak 15' (pen.); Hovsepyan (yellow card) 26'; Igonin (yellow card) 74'; Radimov (yellow card) 90'; Vještica (yellow card) 90+'	Stadium: Eduard Streltsov Stadium; Attendance: 8,200; Referee: Alexander Evstigneev

4 May 2003 7	Torpedo Moscow	3 – 0	Spartak Moscow	Moscow
17:00 MSK (DST) (UTC+4)	Budylin 31' (pen.) (yellow card) 49'; Shirko 41', 81'	Report	Pavlenko (yellow card) 42'	Stadium: Luzhniki Stadium; Attendance: 10,000; Referee: Sergey Frantsuzov

11 May 2003 8	Spartak Moscow	3 – 1	Shinnik Yaroslavl	Moscow
17:00 MSK (DST) (UTC+4)	Kalynychenko 27'; Pavlenko (yellow card) 42'; Kovtun 45'; Kébé (yellow card) 50'; Robert 56'; Vashchuk (yellow card) 68'	Report	Rubins 15'; Shevchuk (yellow card) 44'; D.Vy.Vasilyev (yellow card) 65'	Stadium: Luzhniki Stadium; Attendance: 7,000; Referee: Taras Bezubyak

17 May 2003 9	Rotor Volgograd	1 – 1	Spartak Moscow	Volgograd
16:00 MSK (DST) (UTC+4)	Trifonov 30'; Yesipov (yellow card) 60'; Gaidukov (yellow card) 89'	Report	Luizão (yellow card) 40'; Demenko (yellow card) 62'; Mitreski (yellow card) 68'; Pavlyuchenko (yellow card) 76' (goal) 79'	Stadium: Central Stadium; Attendance: 15,200; Referee: Alexey Tyumin

25 May 2003 10	Spartak Moscow	2 – 1	Dynamo Moscow	Moscow
16:00 MSK (DST) (UTC+4)	Kovtun (yellow card) 15' (goal) 42'; D.A.Smirnov 50'; Kalynychenko (yellow card) 67'; Mitreski (red card) 75'	Report	Batak (yellow card) 8'; Covalenco (yellow card) 40'; Korchagin 43'; Vukomanović (yellow card) 59'; Koroman (yellow card) 68'; Mendy (yellow card) 90+'	Stadium: Luzhniki Stadium; Attendance: 20,000; Referee: Mikhail Khodyrev

31 May 2003 11	Rubin Kazan	1 – 0	Spartak Moscow	Kazan
16:00 MSK (DST) (UTC+4)	Sibaya (yellow card) 36'; Kissi (yellow card) 73'; Novotný 87'; Boyarintsev (yellow card) 90'	Report	Abramidze (yellow card) 32'; D.A.Smirnov (yellow card) 58'; Samedov (yellow card) 69'; Vashchuk (yellow card) 90'	Stadium: Central Stadium; Attendance: 22,000; Referee: Sergey Fursa

11 June 2003 12	Lokomotiv Moscow	2 – 1	Spartak Moscow	Moscow
18:00 MSK (DST) (UTC+4)	Ignashevich 16'; Parks (yellow card) 42'; Evseev 44'	Report	Baranov 62'; Moisés (yellow card) 62'; Kovtun (yellow card) 68'; Luizão (yellow card) 87'	Stadium: Lokomotiv Stadium; Attendance: 11,000; Referee: Aleksandr Kolobaev

19 June 2003 13	Spartak Moscow	0 – 1	Saturn-REN TV	Moscow
19:00 MSK (DST) (UTC+4)	Moisés (yellow card) 24'; Pavlenko (yellow card) 90+'	Report	Kornyukhin (yellow card) 24'; Géder (yellow card) 35'; Amoako (yellow card) 41'; Pavlovich 62' (yellow card) 68'; Rebeja (yellow card) 63'	Stadium: Luzhniki Stadium; Attendance: 10,000; Referee: Igor Egorov

23 June 2003 14	Rostov	3 – 2	Spartak Moscow	Rostov-on-Don
19:00 MSK (DST) (UTC+4)	Osinov 16', 86' (pen.); Maslov (yellow card) 74'; Adamov (yellow card) 80'; Kanyenda 90+'; Zwane (yellow card) 90'	Report	Kovtun (yellow card) 18'; Kalynychenko (yellow card) 41'; D.A.Smirnov 81'; Moisés (yellow card) 82'; Pavlyuchenko (yellow card) 86' (goal) 89'	Stadium: Olimp-2; Attendance: 12,500; Referee: Stanislav Sukhina

27 June 2003 15	Spartak Moscow	2 – 1	Chernomorets Novorossiysk	Moscow
19:30 MSK (DST) (UTC+4)	Kontsevoy 6', 45+'; Kovtun (yellow card) 12'; Pavlenko (red card) 80'; Danishevsky (yellow card) 82'	Report	Ayupov (yellow card) 30'; Teryokhin (yellow card) 38'; Varlamov (yellow card) 48'; Gordiyuk (yellow card) 51'; Flávio (red card) 80'; Kamoltsev 83'	Stadium: Luzhniki Stadium; Attendance: 5,000; Referee: Sergey Lapochkin

12 July 2003 16	Chernomorets Novorossiysk	2 – 3	Spartak Moscow	Novorossiysk
19:00 MSK (DST) (UTC+4)	Ivanov (yellow card) 16'; Kamoltsev 19'; Róbson (yellow card) 38'; Gordiyuk 90'	Report	Pavlyuchenko 23', 40'; Stanić (yellow card) 35'; Titov 38'; Mitreski (yellow card) 54'; Belozyorov (yellow card) 55'; Samedov (yellow card) 74'	Stadium: Central Stadium; Attendance: 12,500; Referee: Sergey Timofeev

19 July 2003 17	Spartak Moscow	1 – 0	Rostov	Moscow
MSK (DST) (UTC+4)	Kovtun (yellow card) 45'; Pavlyuchenko 90'	Report	Mnguni (yellow card) 8'; Osinov (yellow card) 56'; Booth (yellow card) 83'	Stadium: Luzhniki Stadium; Attendance: 9,000; Referee: Sergey Lapochkin

26 July 2003 18	Saturn-REN TV	3 – 2	Spartak Moscow	Ramenskoye
18:00 MSK (DST) (UTC+4)	Pavlovich 7', 60'; Amoako (yellow card) 26'; Régis (yellow card) 73'; Muratović 79'; Da Silva (yellow card) 90+'	Report	Moisés (yellow card) 10' (yellow-red card) 37'; Vashchuk 31' (yellow card) 83' (yellow-red card) 88'; Stanić 66'; Danishevsky (yellow card) 79'	Stadium: Saturn Stadium; Attendance: 16,000; Referee: Aleksandr Gvardis

2 August 2003 19	Spartak Moscow	2 – 5	Lokomotiv Moscow	Moscow
16:00 MSK (DST) (UTC+4)	Titov 63'; Belozyorov 89' (yellow card) 90'	Report	Lekgetho (yellow card) 16'; Buznikin 26'; Ashvetia 34', 60' (yellow card) 36'; Maminov 56'; Ignashevich 78'	Stadium: Luzhniki Stadium; Attendance: 14,000; Referee: Yuri Baskakov

7 August 2003 20	Spartak Moscow	3 – 2	Rotor Volgograd	Moscow
19:00 MSK (DST) (UTC+4)	Titov 18'; Kalynychenko 70'; Pavlyuchenko 90+'	Report	Mogilevskiy (yellow card) 18'; Romanov (yellow card) 39'; Yesipov 55', 60'	Stadium: Luzhniki Stadium; Attendance: 5,000; Referee: Mikhail Semenov

17 August 2003 21	Dynamo Moscow	3 – 2	Spartak Moscow	Moscow
18:00 MSK (DST) (UTC+4)	Korchagin 4'; Bulykin 16'; Baltiev (yellow card) 51'; Kharlachyov 88'	Report	Kontsevoy (yellow card) 27'; Kovtun (yellow card) 35'; Moisés 67'; Danishevsky (yellow card) 72'; Titov 82'	Stadium: Dynamo Stadium; Attendance: 14,000; Referee: Aleksandr Kolobaev

23 August 2003 22	Spartak Moscow	0 – 2	Rubin Kazan	Moscow
18:00 MSK (DST) (UTC+4)	Pavlyuchenko (yellow card) 67'; Danishevsky (yellow card) 71'; Kink (yellow card) 82'	Report	Rôni 19', 29'; Sharonov (yellow card) 54'; Sibaya (yellow card) 58'; Calisto (yellow card) 89'	Stadium: Luzhniki Stadium; Attendance: 5,000; Referee: Taras Bezubyak

31 August 2003 23	Shinnik Yaroslavl	1 – 2	Spartak Moscow	Yaroslavl
17:00 MSK (DST) (UTC+4)	Grishin (yellow card) 38'; Karpenko 60'	Report	Titov 7'; Pavlyuchenko 12' (pen.); Vashchuk (yellow card) 23'; Luizão (yellow card) 30'; Kovtun (yellow card) 53'; Kalynychenko (yellow card) 87'	Stadium: Shinnik Stadium; Attendance: 18,000; Referee: Alexander Gonchar

13 September 2003 24	Spartak Moscow	1 – 0	Torpedo Moscow	Moscow
16:00 MSK (DST) (UTC+4)	Luizão (yellow card) 12'; Titov 16'; Kébé (yellow card) 31'; Kowalewski (yellow card) 71'	Report	Leonchenko (penalty missed) 12'; Shirko (yellow card) 86'	Stadium: Luzhniki Stadium; Attendance: 5,000; Referee: Sergey Fursa

19 September 2003 25	Zenit St.Petersburg	2 – 1	Spartak Moscow	Saint Petersburg
19:00 MSK (DST) (UTC+4)	Mareš (yellow card) 20' (goal) 60'; Bystrov 31' (yellow card) 32'; Kerzhakov (yellow card) 52'; Arshavin (yellow card) 65'	Report	Mitreski (yellow card) 18'; Luizão (yellow card) 26'; Pjanović 66'; Kalynychenko (yellow card) 72'; Kovtun (yellow card) 84' (yellow-red card) 88'	Stadium: Petrovsky Stadium; Attendance: 21,000; Referee: Igor Egorov

29 September 2003 26	Spartak Moscow	1 – 1	Uralan Elista	Moscow
18:00 MSK (DST) (UTC+4)	Stanić (yellow card) 20'; Pavlyuchenko 25'	Report	Abramidze (yellow card) 23'; Sakharov (yellow card) 57'; Bulyga 81'	Stadium: Luzhniki Stadium; Attendance: 4,500; Referee: Sergey Timofeev

5 October 2003 27	Krylia Sovetov	0 – 2	Spartak Moscow	Samara
16:00 MSK (DST) (UTC+4)	Gaúcho (yellow card) 82'	Report	Pavlenko 20'; Kébé (yellow card) 81'; Titov 86'; Kalynychenko (yellow card) 90'	Stadium: Metallurg Stadium; Attendance: 35,000; Referee: Sergey Timofeev

20 October 2003 28	Spartak Moscow	0 – 0	CSKA Moscow	Moscow
19:00 MSK (DST) (UTC+4)	Kébé (yellow card) 17'; Mitreski (yellow card) 42'; Trobok (yellow card) 76'	Report	Jarošík (yellow card) 39'; Gusev (yellow card) 55'	Stadium: Luzhniki Stadium; Attendance: 26,000; Referee: Yuri Chebotarev

25 October 2003 29	Spartak-Alania Vladikavkaz	3 – 0	Spartak Moscow	Vladikavkaz
16:00 MSK (DST) (UTC+4)	Tudor 1'; Drozdov (yellow card) 16'; Dadu (yellow card) 30' (goal) 75'; Sarkisyan (yellow card) 80' (goal) 86'	Report	Pavlenko (yellow card) 40'; Torbinski (yellow card) 48'; Kébé (yellow card) 80' (yellow-red card) 82'	Stadium: Republican Stadium; Attendance: 25,000; Referee: Sergey Fursa

1 November 2003 30	Spartak Moscow	0 – 2	Torpedo-Metallurg Moscow	Moscow
16:00 MSK (UTC+3)		Report	Pinto (yellow card) 34'; Bracamonte 40' (pen.); Džiaukštas (yellow card) 71'; Orlov (yellow card) 75'; Leonov (yellow card) 78'; Monaryov 87'	Stadium: Eduard Streltsov Stadium; Attendance: 3,500; Referee: Aleksandr Kolobaev

==== League table ====
Pos	Team	Pld	W	D	L	GF	GA	GD	Pts	Qualification or relegation
8	Torpedo Moscow	30	11	10	9	42	38	+4	43	
9	Krylia Sovetov Samara	30	11	9	10	38	33	+5	42	
10	Spartak Moscow	30	10	6	14	38	48	−10	36	Qualification to Intertoto Cup first round
11	Rostov	30	8	10	12	30	42	−12	34	
12	Rotor Volgograd	30	9	5	16	33	44	−11	32	

Source: RFPL
Rules for classification: 1st points; 2nd matches won; 3rd head-to-head (points, matches won, goal difference, goals scored, away goals scored); 4th goal difference

=== Russian Cup ===
==== 2002-03 ====
19 March 2003 Quarterfinal	Sokol Saratov	2 – 3	Spartak Moscow	Saratov
18:00 MSK (UTC+3)	Prudius (yellow card) 14'; Hrapkowski 28' (pen.); Zapoyaska (yellow card) 40'; Fedkov 88'	Report	Kalynychenko 7'; Pavlyuchenko 32'; Robert 51'	Stadium: Lokomotiv Stadium; Attendance: 15,000; Referee: Alexander Evstigneev

21 May 2003 Semifinal	Lada-Tolyatti	2 – 3 (a.e.t.)	Spartak Moscow	Tolyatti
18:30 MSK (DST) (UTC+4)	A.Serbin 6'; A.Zhdanov (yellow card) 8'; Davydov 29'	Report	Kovtun (yellow card) 6' (goal) 100'; Luizão (yellow card) 28'; Pavlyuchenko 33', 78'; Pavlenko (yellow card) 58'; Abramidze (yellow card) 84'; Kébé (yellow card) 89'	Stadium: Torpedo Stadium; Attendance: 19,500; Referee: Taras Bezubyak

===== Final =====
15 June 2003	Spartak Moscow	1 – 0	Rostov	Moscow
15:00 MSK (DST) (UTC+4)	Titov 28'; Pavlyuchenko (yellow card) 50'	Report	Blyznyuk (yellow card) 90+'	Stadium: Lokomotiv Stadium; Attendance: 25,000; Referee: Igor Egorov

==== 2003-04 ====
9 November 2003 Round of 32 1st leg	Spartak Moscow	1 – 2	Kuban Krasnodar	Moscow
14:00 MSK (UTC+3)	Luizão (yellow card) 5'; Pjanović 8'; Mitreski (red card) 77'	Report	Dyomin (yellow card) 17'; Topchu (yellow card) 21'; Gerasimenko 25'; Matiola (yellow card) 56'; Lysenko 70'	Stadium: Eduard Streltsov Stadium; Attendance: 3,500; Referee: Mikhail Semenov

22 November 2003 Round of 32 2nd leg	Kuban Krasnodar	1 – 1 (3 – 2 agg.)	Spartak Moscow	Krasnodar
14:00 MSK (UTC+3)	Lysenko 21' (yellow card) 80'; Orekhov (yellow card) 50'	Report	Stanić (yellow card) 21'; Kébé (yellow card) 45'; Torbinski (yellow card) 61'; Pjanović 90+'	Stadium: Kuban Stadium; Attendance: 26,500; Referee: Sergey Timofeev

=== UEFA Cup ===
24 September 2003 First Round 1st leg	Spartak Moscow (Russia)	2 – 0	(Denmark) Esbjerg	Moscow, Russia
MSK (DST) (UTC+4)	Pavlenko 14'; Kalynychenko 33'; Pavlyuchenko (yellow card) 58'	Report		Stadium: Dynamo Stadium

15 October 2003 First Round 2nd leg	Esbjerg (Denmark)	1 – 1 (1 – 3 agg.)	(Russia) Spartak Moscow	Aarhus, Denmark
MSK (DST) (UTC+4)	L.Jørgensen 88'	Report	Pavlyuchenko 43' (red card) 64'; Pavlenko (yellow card) 65'; Kalynychenko (yellow card) 71'; Kébé (yellow card) 77'	Stadium: Aarhus Idrætspark
Note: Match played at Aarhus Idrætspark in Aarhus, instead of Esbjerg's regular Esbjerg Stadium, in Esbjerg.

6 November 2003 Second Round 1st leg	Spartak Moscow (Russia)	4 – 0	(Romania) Dinamo București	Moscow, Russia
19:00 MSK (DST) (UTC+4)	Pjanović 23', 62'; Moisés (yellow card) 57'; Kalynychenko 59'; Pavlenko 73'	Report	Semeghin (yellow card) 43'; Badea (yellow card) 53' (red card) 89'	Stadium: Lokomotiv Stadium; Referee: Dick van Egmond (Netherlands)

27 November 2003 Second Round 2nd leg	Dinamo București (Romania)	3 – 1 (3 – 5 agg.)	(Russia) Spartak Moscow	Bucharest, Romania
21:00 MSK (DST) (UTC+4)	Dănciulescu 28', 73' (pen.) (yellow card) 36'; Iordache 58'; Bărcăuan (red card) 87'	Report	Kébé (yellow card) 31'; Torbinski (yellow card) 62'; Kalynychenko (yellow card) 70'; Mitreski (yellow card) 72'; Parfenov 85' (pen.); Pjanović (yellow card) 90'	Stadium: Stadionul Dinamo; Referee: Costas Kapitanis (Cyprus)

== Squad statistics ==
As of match played 27 November 2003

=== Appearances and goals ===
No.	Pos	Nat	Player	Total		Premier League		2002-03 Russian Cup		2003-04 Russian Cup		UEFA Cup	
No.	Pos	Nat	Player	Apps	Goals	Apps	Goals	Apps	Goals	Apps	Goals	Apps	Goals
1	GK	(Hungary) HUN	Szabolcs Sáfár	5	0	5	0	0	0	0	0	0	0
2	DF	(Russia) RUS	Yuri Kovtun	27	3	23	2	2	1	0	0	2	0
3	DF	(Senegal) SEN	Ibra Kébé	24	0	16	0	2	0	2	0	4	0
4	DF	(Brazil) BRA	Moisés Moura	26	1	20	1	1	0	1	0	4	0
5	DF	(Ukraine) UKR	Vladyslav Vashchuk	29	1	22+3	1	1+1	0	0	0	2	0
6	MF	(Serbia and Montenegro) SCG	Goran Trobok	14	0	7	0	1	0	2	0	4	0
8	FW	(Russia) RUS	Aleksandr Danishevsky	21	0	3+12	0	0+2	0	0+1	0	0+3	0
9	MF	(Russia) RUS	Yegor Titov	37	10	29+1	9	2+1	1	0	0	4	0
10	FW	(Russia) RUS	Roman Pavlyuchenko	34	14	26+1	10	3	3	1+1	0	2	1
11	MF	(Croatia) CRO	Danijel Hrman	6	0	4+2	0	0	0	0	0	0	0
13	MF	(Serbia and Montenegro) SCG	Srđan Stanić	13	1	8+3	1	0	0	1	0	0+1	0
14	MF	(Ukraine) UKR	Maksym Kalynychenko	36	5	22+5	2	2+1	1	2	0	4	2
17	DF	(Brazil) BRA	Russo	2	0	0+1	0	0	0	0	0	0+1	0
18	DF	(Ukraine) UKR	Dmytro Parfenov	5	1	1	0	0	0	2	0	2	1
19	DF	(North Macedonia) MKD	Igor Mitreski	23	0	15+1	0	2	0	1	0	3+1	0
20	DF	(Russia) RUS	Aleksandr Belozyorov	7	1	5+2	1	0	0	0	0	0	0
21	MF	(Russia) RUS	Artyom Bezrodny	1	0	0+1	0	0	0	0	0	0	0
22	GK	(Morocco) MAR	Abdelillah Bagui	7	0	6	0	1	0	0	0	0	0
23	FW	(Belarus) BLR	Raman Vasilyuk	1	0	0+1	0	0	0	0	0	0	0
25	MF	(Russia) RUS	Aleksandr Pavlenko	30	4	21	2	3	0	2	0	4	2
26	MF	(Russia) RUS	Aleksandr Sheshukov	3	0	0+2	0	0	0	0+1	0	0	0
27	DF	(Brazil) BRA	Luizão	22	0	16+1	0	3	0	2	0	0	0
28	FW	(Serbia and Montenegro) SCG	Mihajlo Pjanović	12	5	3+3	1	0	0	2	2	3+1	2
30	GK	(Poland) POL	Wojciech Kowalewski	16	0	10	0	0	0	2	0	4	0
33	MF	(Russia) RUS	Maksim Demenko	22	0	16+3	0	2	0	0	0	0+1	0
34	FW	(Belarus) BLR	Artem Kontsevoy	10	2	5+4	2	0	0	0	0	0+1	0
37	FW	(Estonia) EST	Tarmo Kink	2	0	0+2	0	0	0	0	0	0	0
40	MF	(Russia) RUS	Aleksandr Samedov	7	0	2+4	0	0	0	0+1	0	0	0
41	MF	(Russia) RUS	Dmitri Torbinski	7	0	1+2	0	0	0	2	0	2	0
46	GK	(Russia) RUS	Aleksei Zuev	11	0	9	0	2	0	0	0	0	0
Players away from the club on loan:
15	DF	(Georgia (country)) GEO	Valeri Abramidze	10	0	6+3	0	1	0	0	0	0	0
Players who appeared for Spartak Moscow but left during the season:
6	MF	(Russia) RUS	Dmitry A. Smirnov	19	2	14+3	2	1+1	0	0	0	0	0
7	MF	(Belarus) BLR	Vasili Baranov	13	2	10	2	2+1	0	0	0	0	0
11	MF	(Ukraine) UKR	Oleh Pestryakov	3	0	1+2	0	0	0	0	0	0	0
17	FW	(Brazil) BRA	Robert	11	2	4+5	1	2	1	0	0	0	0
28	FW	(Brazil) BRA	André Dias	2	0	0+1	0	0+1	0	0	0	0	0
42	FW	(Nigeria) NGR	Okon Flo Essien	2	0	1+1	0	0	0	0	0	0	0

=== Goal scorers ===
Place	Position	Nation	Number	Name	Premier League	2002-03 Russian Cup	2003-04 Russian Cup	UEFA Cup	Total
1	FW	(Russia)	10	Roman Pavlyuchenko	10	3	0	1	14
2	MF	(Russia)	9	Yegor Titov	9	1	0	0	10
3	MF	(Ukraine)	14	Maksym Kalynychenko	2	1	0	2	5
3	FW	(Serbia and Montenegro)	28	Mihajlo Pjanović	1	0	2	2	5
5	MF	(Russia)	25	Aleksandr Pavlenko	2	0	0	2	4
6	DF	(Russia)	2	Yuri Kovtun	2	1	0	0	3
7	MF	(Belarus)	7	Vasili Baranov	2	0	0	0	2
7	MF	(Russia)	6	Dmitry A. Smirnov	2	0	0	0	2
7	FW	(Belarus)	34	Artem Kontsevoy	2	0	0	0	2
7	FW	(Brazil)	17	Robert	1	1	0	0	2
11	DF	(Ukraine)	5	Vladyslav Vashchuk	1	0	0	0	1
11	MF	(Serbia and Montenegro)	13	Srđan Stanić	1	0	0	0	1
11	DF	(Russia)	20	Aleksandr Belozyorov	1	0	0	0	1
11	DF	(Brazil)	4	Moisés Moura	1	0	0	0	1
11	DF	(Ukraine)	18	Dmytro Parfenov	0	0	0	1	1
11				Own goal	1	0	0	0	1
Total					38	7	2	8	55

=== Clean sheets ===
Place	Position	Nation	Number	Name	Premier League	2002-03 Russian Cup	2003-04 Russian Cup	UEFA Cup	Total
1	GK	(Poland)	30	Wojciech Kowalewski	3	0	0	2	5
2	GK	(Hungary)	1	Szabolcs Sáfár	1	0	0	0	1
2	GK	(Morocco)	22	Abdelillah Bagui	1	0	0	0	1
2	GK	(Russia)	46	Aleksei Zuev	0	1	0	0	1
TOTALS					5	1	0	2	8

=== Disciplinary record ===
Number	Nation	Position	Name	Premier League		2002-03 Russian Cup		2003-04 Russian Cup		UEFA Cup		Total	
Number	Nation	Position	Name	Yellow card	Red card	Yellow card	Red card	Yellow card	Red card	Yellow card	Red card	Yellow card	Red card
2	(Russia)	DF	Yuri Kovtun	11	2	1	0	0	0	0	0	12	2
3	(Senegal)	DF	Ibra Kébé	7	1	1	0	1	0	2	0	11	1
4	(Brazil)	DF	Moisés Moura	6	1	0	0	0	0	1	0	7	1
5	(Ukraine)	DF	Vladyslav Vashchuk	7	1	0	0	0	0	0	0	7	1
6	(Serbia and Montenegro)	MF	Goran Trobok	1	0	0	0	0	0	0	0	1	0
8	(Russia)	FW	Aleksandr Danishevsky	4	0	0	0	0	0	0	0	4	0
10	(Russia)	FW	Roman Pavlyuchenko	4	0	1	0	0	0	1	1	6	1
13	(Serbia and Montenegro)	MF	Srđan Stanić	2	0	0	0	1	0	0	0	3	0
14	(Ukraine)	MF	Maksym Kalynychenko	5	0	0	0	0	0	2	0	7	0
19	(North Macedonia)	DF	Igor Mitreski	4	1	0	0	0	1	1	0	5	2
20	(Russia)	DF	Aleksandr Belozyorov	2	0	0	0	0	0	0	0	2	0
25	(Russia)	MF	Aleksandr Pavlenko	4	1	1	0	0	0	1	0	6	1
27	(Brazil)	DF	Luizão	7	0	1	0	1	0	0	0	9	0
28	(Serbia and Montenegro)	FW	Mihajlo Pjanović	0	0	0	0	0	0	1	0	1	0
30	(Poland)	GK	Wojciech Kowalewski	1	0	0	0	0	0	0	0	1	0
33	(Russia)	MF	Maksim Demenko	1	0	0	0	0	0	0	0	1	0
34	(Belarus)	FW	Artem Kontsevoy	1	0	0	0	0	0	0	0	1	0
37	(Estonia)	FW	Tarmo Kink	1	0	0	0	0	0	0	0	1	0
40	(Russia)	MF	Aleksandr Samedov	2	0	0	0	0	0	0	0	2	0
41	(Russia)	MF	Dmitri Torbinski	1	0	0	0	1	0	1	0	3	0
Players away on loan:
15	(Georgia (country))	DF	Valeri Abramidze	1	0	1	0	0	0	0	0	2	0
Players who left Spartak Moscow season during the season:
6	(Russia)	MF	Dmitry A. Smirnov	1	0	0	0	0	0	0	0	1	0
Total				73	7	6	0	4	1	10	1	93	9
