= Roman Pavlyuchenko =

Russian footballer (born 1981)

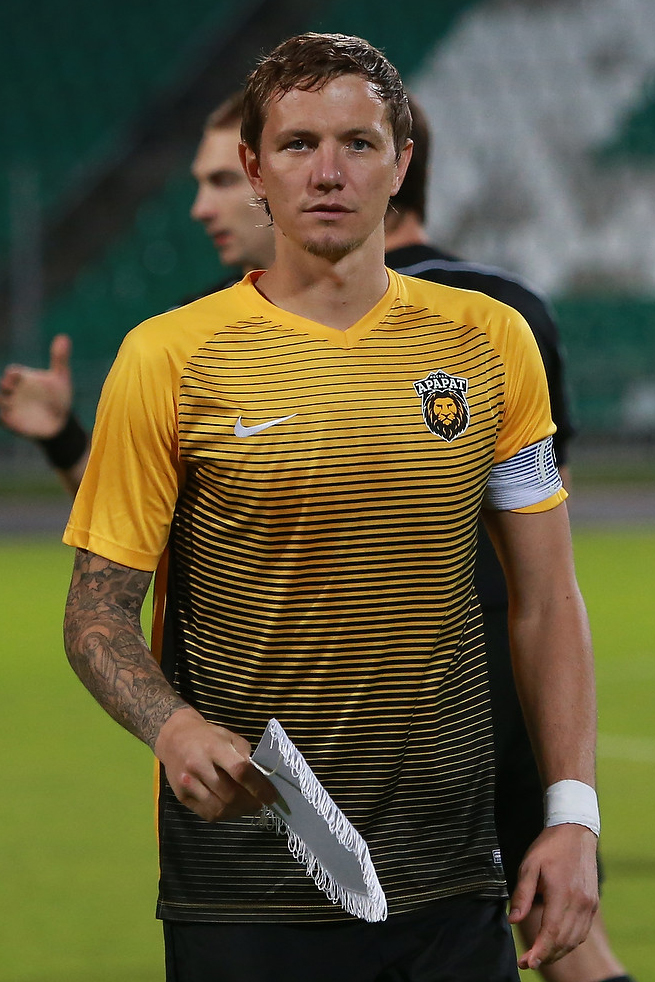
- Pavlyuchenko with Ararat Moscow in 2017

Personal information
- Full name: Roman Anatolyevich Pavlyuchenko
- Date of birth: 15 December 1981 (age 44)
- Place of birth: Mostovskoy, Russian Soviet Federative Socialist Republic, Soviet Union
- Height: 1.88 m (6 ft 2 in)
- Position: Striker

Team information
- Current team: Rodina-2 Moscow (forwards coach)

Youth career
- 1990–1997: Victory Sports School
- 1997–1998: Dynamo Stavropol

Senior career*
| Years | Team | Apps | (Gls) |
| 1998–1999 | Dynamo Stavropol | 31 | (11) |
| 2000–2002 | Rotor Volgograd | 65 | (14) |
| 2000 | → Rotor-2 Volgograd | 13 | (3) |
| 2003–2008 | Spartak Moscow | 141 | (69) |
| 2008–2012 | Tottenham Hotspur | 78 | (21) |
| 2012–2015 | Lokomotiv Moscow | 71 | (15) |
| 2015–2016 | Kuban Krasnodar | 10 | (2) |
| 2016–2017 | Ural Yekaterinburg | 21 | (4) |
| 2017 | Ararat Moscow | 11 | (9) |
| 2020–2022 | Znamya Noginsk | 48 | (32) |
| Total | | 489 | (179) |

International career
| 2001–2003 | Russia U21 | 12 | (5) |
| 2003–2012 | Russia | 51 | (21) |

Managerial career
- 2024–: Rodina-2 Moscow (forwards coach)
Medal record
Men's football
Representing Russia
UEFA European Championship
| Bronze medal – third place | 2008 |
- * Club domestic league appearances and goals

Roman Anatolyevich Pavlyuchenko (Russian: Роман Анатольевич Павлюченко; born 15 December 1981) is a Russian football coach and a former player who played as a striker. He works as a forwards coach with Rodina-2 Moscow.

He started his career at Dynamo Stavropol, and Rotor Volgograd, before transferring to Spartak Moscow in 2003. His performances there earned him a £13.7 million transfer to Tottenham Hotspur of the English Premier League in 2008, where he spent three full seasons before returning to Russia to play for Lokomotiv Moscow. After another full 3 seasons he moved in July 2015, to Kuban Krasnodar.

A full international for a decade following his debut in 2003, Pavlyuchenko earned 51 caps for Russia, and scored 21 international goals. He was named in the Team of the Tournament at Euro 2008, with Russia reaching the semi-finals, and was also in their squad for Euro 2012.

== Early career ==
Pavlyuchenko was born in the village of Mostovskoy, Krasnodar Krai. Pavlyuchenko was raised by his father Anatoly A. V. Pavlyuchenko and his mother Lyubov Vladimirovna. Pavlyuchenko has a sister. A few days after Pavlyuchenko was born, the family moved to Karachay-Cherkessia, the city of Ust-Dzheguta. Pavlyuchenko began his football career when he joined Victory Sports School and stayed there for seven years before joining another youth club, Dynamo Stavropol.

== Club career ==
=== Dynamo Stavropol ===
Pavlyuchenko started his football career at Dynamo Stavropol. Under the guidance of coach Vladimir Tokarev and Vladimir Kitin, Pavlyuchenko did not stand out among the rest of the Dynamo players. But under Fyodor Gagloyev, he was first invited to join pre-season tour with the club. Pavlyuchenko made his debut for the club, coming on as a substitute, in a 1–0 loss against Moscow on 5 April 1999. On 15 May 1999, Pavlyuchenko provided a double assist in a 2–1 win over Chita. In his first season, Pavlyuchenko made 31 appearances and scoring 11 goals. However, the club played was still relegated to the Second Division after the club was last place. Despite this, Pavlyuchenko was named 'Team of the top' junior division for the first version of the newspaper Sport Express.

=== Rotor Volgograd ===
Pavlyuchenko moved to Rotor Volgograd in 2000, although the move was made in the summer of 1999, despite president Rochus Shohu rejecting the offer. In his first match, Pavlyuchenko made his debut for the club against Elista where he received a red card after he punched an opponent player in the face. On 8 July 2000, Pavlyuchenko scored his first goal against Rostov where in his first season, he made 16 appearances and scored 5 goals. The club finished 11th in the league. In his second season, Pavlyuchenko made 28 appearances and scored 5 goals while the club finished 10th in the league. In his third season, Pavlyuchenko made 21 appearances and scored 4 times.

=== Spartak Moscow ===
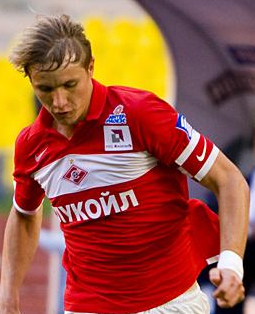
Pavlyuchenko during his time at Spartak Moscow.

Pavlyuchenko moved to Spartak Moscow in the spring of 2003 for €700,000 where the deal between the two clubs was agreed. He was a replacement for Vladimir Beschastnykh, who left for Turkish side Fenerbahçe S.K. On 15 March 2003, Pavlyuchenko made his debut for the club against Moscow. The next game on 22 March 2003, Pavlyuchenko scored his first goal for the club in a 2–1 loss against Alania Vladikavkaz. In his first season, Pavlyuchenko scored 10, making him the best scorer in the team. Also the club placed in 10th place and achieved winning the Russian Cup in a 1–0 win with Pavlyuchenko played for 87 minutes before being substituted. Also, Pavlyuchenko scored in the second leg on 15 October 2003 in a 1–1 draw against Esbjerg of the UEFA Cup which he made his debut in the competition on 24 September 2003. In his second season, Pavlyuchenko made 26 appearances and scored 10 goals which once again he was the most effective player on the team, which took eighth place in the league. In his third season, Pavlyuchenko made 25 appearances and scored 11.

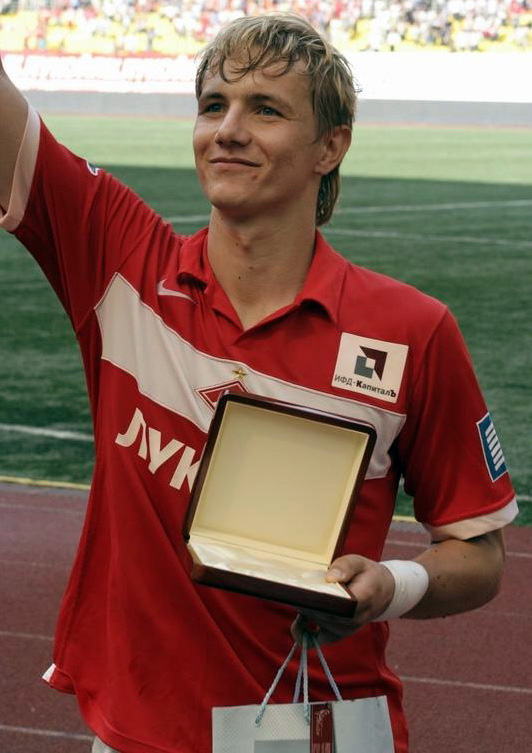
Pavlyuchenko receiving a gift from the club.

In his fourth season, Pavlyuchenko was the top scorer in the league with 18 goals and the first player to do so at Spartak Moscow. This also became the first player in the history of Spartak, who was tournament top scorer after the creation of the Russian Federation in 1992. The club was also close to winning the league but lost out to CSKA Moscow having the same points but with an inferior goal difference. In his fifth season, Pavlyuchenko became a top scorer with 14 goals along with Roman Adamov. With Spartak Moscow he qualified for the UEFA Champions League. Pavlyuchenko was the hero when he scored the winning goal and provided an assist for Mozart in a 2–1 win over Slovan Liberec in the second leg of Champions League Qualification following a first leg 0–0 draw. That win would secure the club Champions League status as Spartak Moscow would play in the group stage and were drawn against Sporting Clube de Portugal, Bayern Munich and Inter Milan. On 18 October 2006, Pavlyuchenko scored the only goal in a 2–1 loss against Inter Milan Matchday 3. On 5 December 2006 Matchday 6, Pavlyuchenko scored the first goal in the game as Spartak Moscow win 3–1 over Sporting Lisbon. This win ensured Spartak Moscow would go to the UEFA Cup after becoming third in the group stage. The following season Spartak faced Celtic in their UEFA Champions League qualifier. The first leg finished 1–1, with Pavlyuchenko scoring Spartak's goal. The second leg also finished 1–1 with Pavlyuchenko scoring again, though he also missed a penalty in normal time. The game went to penalties and Spartak lost. On 19 April 2007, Pavlyuchenko scored his first hat-trick for the club in a 3–0 win over Kuban Krasnodar. In his fourth and last season, Pavlyuchenko made 14 appearances and scored 6.

During his time at Spartak, Pavlyuchenko was the club's most prolific goalscorer, scoring 69 goals in 141 games. His goalscoring, together with his loyalty to the rhombik (the club's emblem), earned him much respect and appreciation from the "Army of Red-White Fans".

=== Tottenham Hotspur ===
In September 2008, Pavlyuchenko signed for Tottenham Hotspur for a fee of £13.7 million.

Pavlyuchenko made his debut for Spurs on 15 September against Aston Villa. He scored his first goal on 24 September 2008, in the 2–1 League Cup 3rd round win against Newcastle United. Pavlyuchenko went on to score his first league goal for the club in the 2–0 victory against Bolton Wanderers on 26 October 2008. On 16 May 2009 in a 2–1 win over Manchester City, Pavlyuchenko was substituted 15 minutes before full-time for Fraizer Campbell. Unhappy at coming off, Pavlyuchenko stormed down the tunnel rather joining his teammates on the bench. His actions were criticised by Harry Redknapp, saying that he let the players and fans down.

"I don't like that, It's not something I like. You're looking to scrap away. The fans are here and paying their money to watch and I think when a player runs down the tunnel without sitting down and watching and getting behind the team, I think that is disrespectful to his team-mates

— Redknapp reaction on Pavlyuchenko actions.

Pavlyuchenko then apologised for his actions, saying it wasn't his best performance and was angry at himself after coming off the pitch and not at the decision to replace him.

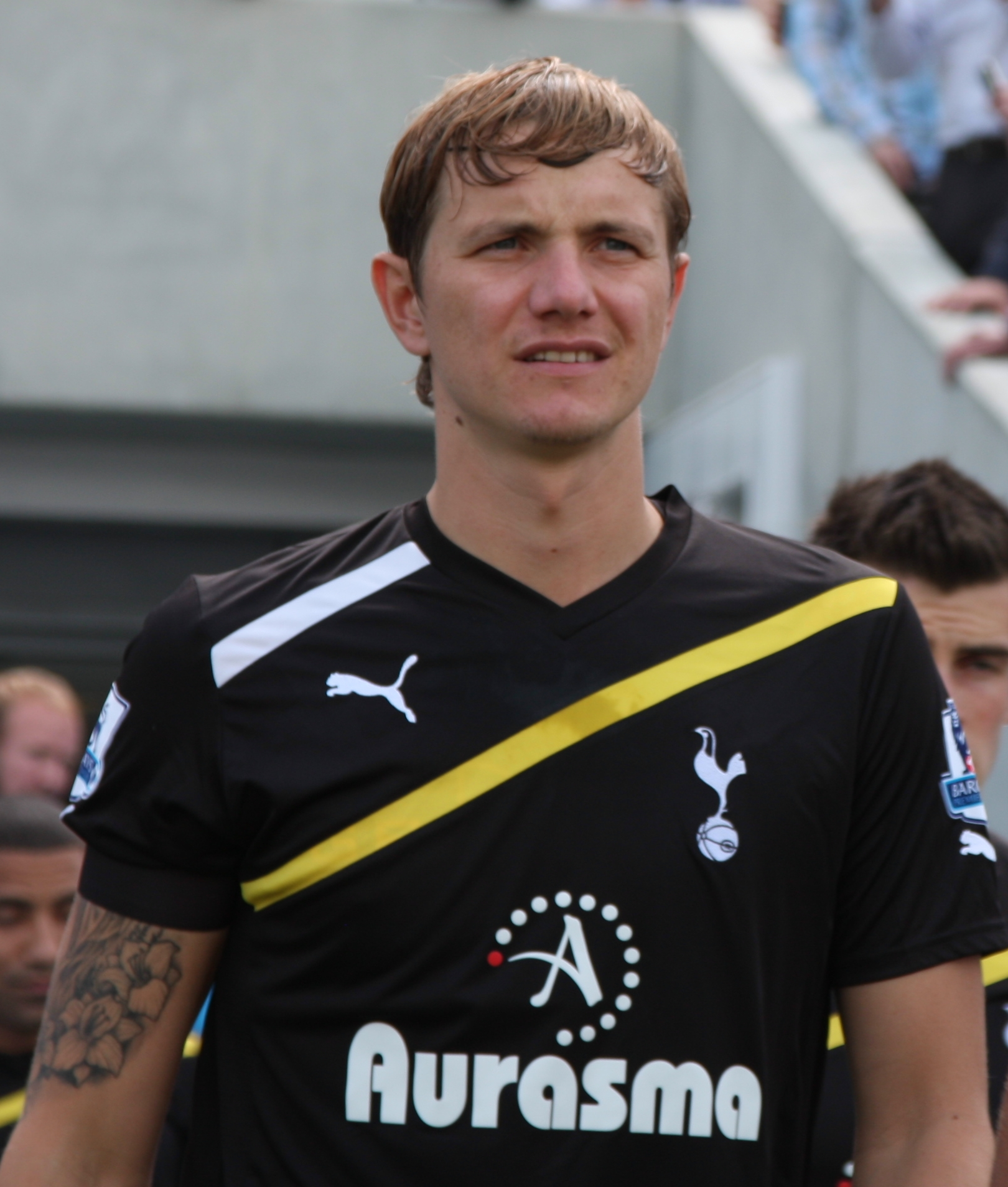
Pavlyuchenko wearing a Tottenham Hotspur shirt.

He has scored in every English domestic cup competition game he has played in, except for the 2009 Football League Cup Final. In the 2009–10 season, Pavlyuchenko was fourth-choice striker for Tottenham, with Harry Redknapp preferring Robbie Keane, Peter Crouch and Jermain Defoe to the Russian which Pavlyuchenko was linked a move away from the club. Pavlyuchenko has been linked with clubs like Lokomotiv Moscow, Zenit Saint Petersburg, Roma, A.C. Milan, Hertha BSC, Birmingham City, West Ham United and Spartak Moscow. However, Pavlyuchenko says that he cannot understand why the club didn't let him leave the club, without any explanation.

Pavlyuchenko came on as a substitute on 21 February against Wigan Athletic and scored his first league goal of the season, a close-range finish to make the score 2–0. He also added a second from a very tight angle during injury time to make it 3–0. Harry Redknapp acknowledged the importance of his performance and remarked on Pavlyuchenko's popularity with the fans in his post-match interview. He made his second start of the season three days later in the FA Cup fifth-round replay against Bolton Wanderers and scored twice, a match Tottenham won 4–0. Redknapp has since gone on to say that the Russian striker has taken his opportunity and may well see further first team action. Pavlyuchenko continued his good form with another goal against Everton on 28 February, and another two goals against Blackburn Rovers on 13 March. He also scored a goal in the quarter-final replay against Fulham at White Hart Lane on 24 March.

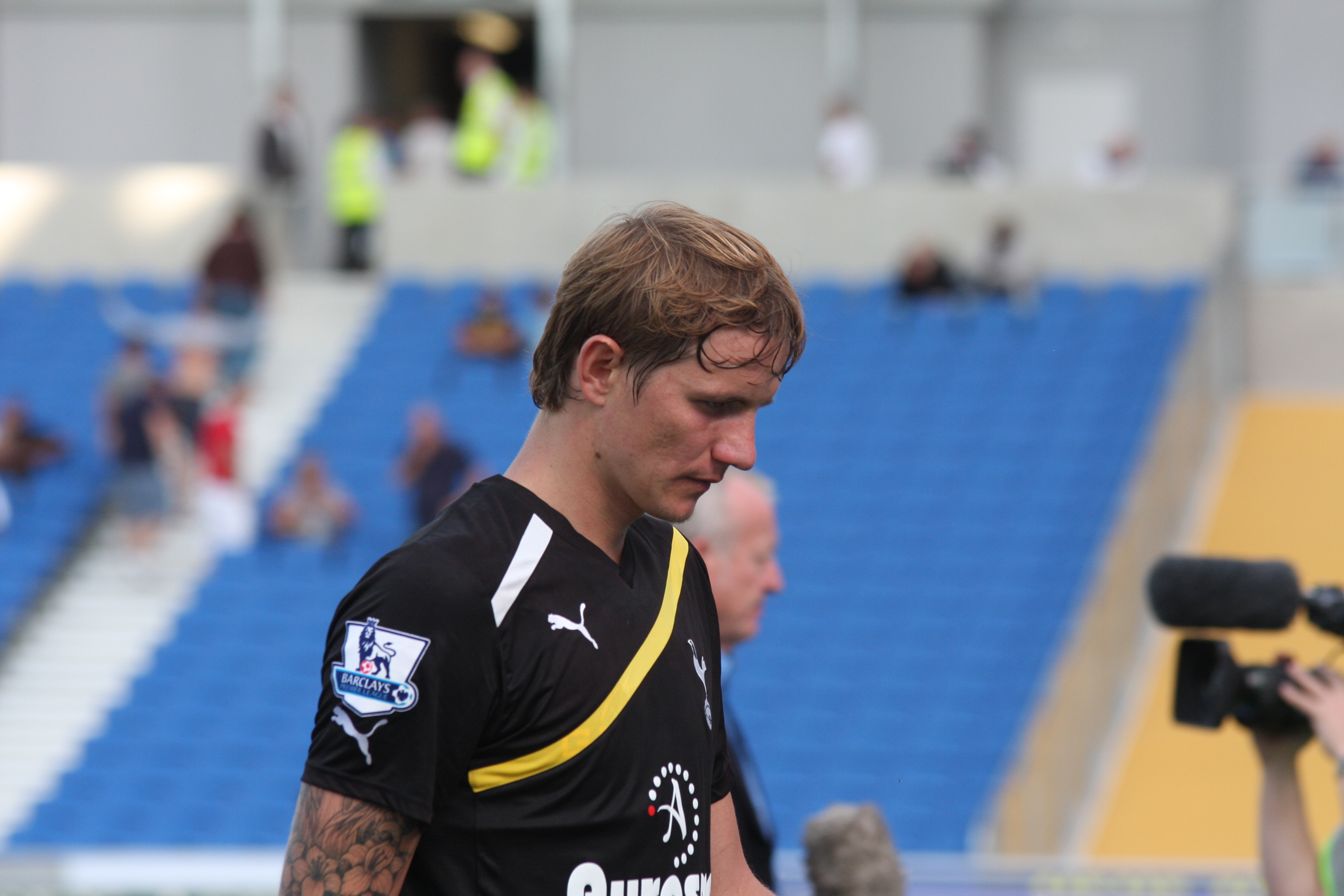
Pavlyuchenko in 2011.

On 17 August, he scored a vital away goal against BSC Young Boys in the Champions League play-off round first leg. Tottenham were losing 3–0 until a Sébastien Bassong header pulled it back to 3–1 and Pavlyuchenko later made it 3–2. In the second leg, Spurs won 4–0 at home, meaning that they would progress into the Champions League group stages. Pavlyuchenko's promising form in this tournament continued with two second-half penalty strikes against FC Twente in Tottenham's second group match, followed by a decisive third goal as Spurs beat cup holders Inter Milan on Matchday 4. On 4 November, Pavlyuchenko scored with a volley in a 4–2 defeat to Bolton Wanderers. The following weekend, he scored again in a home win against Blackburn Rovers. On 6 March 2011, he scored a goal against Wolves. He scored the first goal against West Bromwich Albion on 2–2 draw on April. Pavlyuchenko scored a goal in a London derby against Chelsea in a 1–1 draw. On 22 May, the final day of the season, Pavlyuchenko scored two stunning long-range goals in a 2–1 win against Birmingham City to ensure that Tottenham finished fifth in the Premier League and qualified for the 2011–12 UEFA Europa League. The win also relegated Birmingham to the Championship.

The Russian's Tottenham career up until this point had consisted of constantly being down the pecking order in the 2009–10 season despite having a better goals per minute ratio than all of his fellow strike partners in Jermain Defoe, Peter Crouch and Robbie Keane. The same went for the 2010–11 season when in March Pavlyuchenko had a minutes per goals ratio of 151 compared to competitors Jermain Defoe who had 208, Peter Crouch had 243 and Rafael van der Vaart had 161. On 22 May 2011, Pavlyuchenko scored a brace against Birmingham City, to relegate them to the EFL Championship, on the 38th Match Day. In December of the 2011–12 season, the striker had been restricted to just 18 minutes of Premier League football, until he came on against Sunderland and went on to score the only goal of the game in the 61st minute. This was his third goal of the season having scored against Shamrock Rovers and Rubin Kazan in the Europa League earlier in the season.

=== Lokomotiv Moscow ===
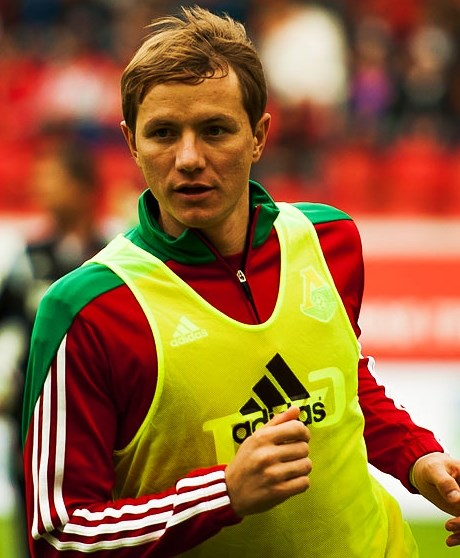
Pavlyuchenko with Lokomotiv Moscow in 2014.

In early 2012, Tottenham unilaterally invoked an option to extend Pavlyuchenko's contract until the end of next season. Reports claim that Pavlyuchenko had been involved in a training ground bust-up with Spurs coach Kevin Bond which led him to leave the club in the January transfer window. This was later denied by his agent. On the transfer deadline, Pavlyuchenko signed a deal with Lokomotiv Moscow for a fee of £8 million with Louis Saha as his replacement. On 3 March 2012, Pavlyuchenko made his debut in his first match back at Russia since 2008 against Kuban Krasnodar in a 2–0 win. On 24 March 2012, Pavlyuchenko scored his first goal in over four years in Russia in a 2–0 win over CSKA Moscow and provided an assist for Felipe Caicedo. After starting first 6 games of the 2012–13 season under the new manager Slaven Bilić, he lost his spot in the starting lineup and was intermittently used as a substitute for the rest of the season. In the 2013–14 season, there was again a change of manager in Lokomotiv, but Pavlyuchenko was still used as a substitute by Leonid Kuchuk.

=== Kuban Krasnodar ===
On 16 July 2015, Kuban Krasnodar announced the signing of Pavlyuchenko. He reunited with former Russia teammate Andrei Arshavin.

=== Ural Yekaterinburg ===
On 25 June 2016, following Kuban's relegation, he signed a one-year deal with FC Ural Yekaterinburg.

=== Ararat Moscow ===
On 30 May 2017, he signed with FC Ararat Moscow and played with the new club in the Russian Professional Football League (third-level). On 17 November 2017, his Ararat contract was dissolved by mutual consent.

=== Znamya Noginsk ===
On 31 August 2018, he joined the fourth-tier Russian Amateur Football League side FC Znamya Noginsk. He announced he will be with the team on part-time basis and play only in home games. He then returned to Ararat for 3 months in 2019 and then back to Znamya, both at amateur fourth-tier. As Znamya was promoted to Russian Professional Football League for the 2020–21 season, he returned to professional-level football at the age of 38. He was joined at Znamya by former Russian internationals Aleksandr Samedov, Renat Yanbayev and Aleksandr Sheshukov. On 21 August 2021, he scored 4 goals in a 5–3 victory over FC Kolomna which was the first time he scored 4 goals in a competitive game in his career. On 19 October 2022 in a game against FC Kosmos Dolgoprudny, Pavlyuchenko was sent off after trying to fight an opponent and swearing at him. Russian Football Union banned him for 8 games for his conduct. Following that, Pavlyuchenko announced his retirement from playing.

== International career ==
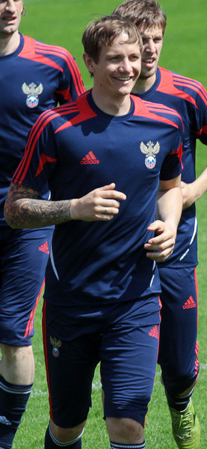
Pavlyuchenko training with the Russian national football team.

Pavlyuchenko made his debut for the Russian national team on 20 August 2003, replacing Dmitriy Sychev at half-time of a 3–1 friendly loss to Israel at Lokomotiv Stadium in Moscow. He did not play again until 3 September 2005, when he started in a 2–0 home win over Liechtenstein in World Cup qualification. He scored his first goal on his third cap on 8 October, the third in a 5–1 win over Luxembourg in World Cup qualification, four minutes after coming on for Andrey Arshavin.

=== Euro 2008 ===
Roman Pavlyuchenko was in the spotlight when he scored both goals in Russia's 2–1 victory in a crucial Euro 2008 qualification match against England. He was named in Guus Hiddink's 23-man squad for UEFA Euro 2008, and scored in warm-up victories against Serbia and Lithuania.

He scored a late consolation goal in Russia's loss to Spain in their opening match of the campaign and the first goal in Russia's third match of the tournament against Sweden to send Russia through at Sweden's expense. He was declared man of the match after the 1–0 game with Greece, although he did not score in the game, and then scored the first goal of the match in Russia's 3–1 quarter final victory over the Netherlands. After the tournament ended, he was named in the 23-man Team of the Tournament.

=== Euro 2012 ===
Pavlyuchenko scored his first international hat-trick on 4 June 2011 in a European qualifier against Armenia in Saint Petersburg.

He was confirmed for the finalized UEFA Euro 2012 squad on 25 May 2012. In their opening match against the Czech Republic on 8 June in Wroclaw, he came off the bench in the 73rd minute and set up his teammate Alan Dzagoev for Russia's third goal. Minutes later he scored Russia's fourth goal, and Russia went on to win 4–1. Pavlyuchenko come on as a substitute against Poland (1–1) and Greece (0–1), which caused the team to be eliminated from the group.

=== Retirement ===
On 24 July 2013, Pavlyuchenko announced his retirement from international duty.

== Coaching career ==
On 11 April 2024, Pavlyuchenko was hired as a forwards' coach by Rodina-2 Moscow.

== Personal life ==
Pavlyuchenko marrired Larisa (née Baranova) in 2000; the couple had known each other since 6th grade when he switched schools. They have three daughters. His sister-in-law is his wife's twin, who also studied in the same school.

In Russia, Pavlyuchenko is a local Duma (city council) deputy in Stavropol, representing United Russia party, although "because of my profession it won't be easy for me to take part directly in the workings of the city council – but I am ready to help with advice and with a concrete contribution to the development possibilities for exercise and sport".

In early 2012, Pavlyuchenko was among several hundreds of Russian celebrities contacted by Vladimir Putin's election campaign to endorse Putin for president ahead of the 2012 Russian presidential election.

== Career statistics ==
=== Club ===
As of match played 1 October 2017

Appearances and goals by club, season and competition
| Club | Season | League | | | Cup | | League Cup | | Europe | | Other | | Total | |
| Club | Season | Division | Apps | Goals | Apps | Goals | Apps | Goals | Apps | Goals | Apps | Goals | Apps | Goals |
|---|---|---|---|---|---|---|---|---|---|---|---|---|---|---|
| Dynamo Stavropol | 1999 | Russian First Division | 31 | 11 | 3 | 0 | – | | – | | – | | 34 | 11 |
| Rotor | 2000 | Russian Top Division | 16 | 5 | 1 | 1 | – | | – | | – | | 17 | 6 |
| Rotor | 2001 | Russian Top Division | 28 | 5 | 0 | 0 | – | | – | | – | | 28 | 5 |
| Rotor | 2002 | Russian Premier League | 21 | 4 | 1 | 0 | – | | – | | – | | 22 | 4 |
| Rotor | Total | | 65 | 14 | 2 | 1 | 0 | 0 | 0 | 0 | 0 | 0 | 67 | 15 |
| Spartak Moscow | 2003 | Russian Premier League | 27 | 10 | 5 | 3 | 1 | 2 | 2 | 1 | – | | 35 | 16 |
| Spartak Moscow | 2004 | Russian Premier League | 26 | 10 | 2 | 0 | – | | 5 | 3 | 1 | 0 | 34 | 13 |
| Spartak Moscow | 2005 | Russian Premier League | 25 | 11 | 1 | 1 | – | | – | | – | | 26 | 12 |
| Spartak Moscow | 2006 | Russian Premier League | 27 | 18 | 6 | 0 | – | | 10 | 3 | 1 | 0 | 44 | 21 |
| Spartak Moscow | 2007 | Russian Premier League | 22 | 14 | 3 | 0 | – | | 8 | 6 | 0 | 0 | 33 | 20 |
| Spartak Moscow | 2008 | Russian Premier League | 14 | 6 | 0 | 0 | – | | 3 | 1 | – | | 17 | 7 |
| Spartak Moscow | Total | | 141 | 69 | 17 | 4 | 1 | 2 | 28 | 14 | 2 | 0 | 189 | 89 |
| Tottenham Hotspur | 2008–09 | Premier League | 28 | 5 | 2 | 3 | 6 | 6 | 0 | 0 | – | | 36 | 14 |
| Tottenham Hotspur | 2009–10 | Premier League | 16 | 5 | 6 | 4 | 2 | 1 | – | | – | | 24 | 10 |
| Tottenham Hotspur | 2010–11 | Premier League | 29 | 10 | 1 | 0 | 1 | 0 | 8 | 4 | – | | 39 | 14 |
| Tottenham Hotspur | 2011–12 | Premier League | 5 | 1 | 2 | 1 | 1 | 0 | 6 | 2 | – | | 14 | 4 |
| Tottenham Hotspur | Total | | 78 | 21 | 11 | 8 | 10 | 7 | 14 | 6 | 0 | 0 | 113 | 42 |
| Lokomotiv Moscow | 2011–12 | Russian Premier League | 9 | 2 | 1 | 0 | – | | 0 | 0 | – | | 10 | 2 |
| Lokomotiv Moscow | 2012–13 | Russian Premier League | 19 | 4 | 1 | 0 | – | | – | | – | | 20 | 4 |
| Lokomotiv Moscow | 2013–14 | Russian Premier League | 24 | 6 | 1 | 0 | – | | – | | – | | 25 | 6 |
| Lokomotiv Moscow | 2014–15 | Russian Premier League | 20 | 3 | 2 | 0 | – | | – | | – | | 22 | 3 |
| Lokomotiv Moscow | Total | | 72 | 15 | 5 | 0 | 0 | 0 | 0 | 0 | 0 | 0 | 77 | 15 |
| Kuban Krasnodar | 2015–16 | Russian Premier League | 10 | 2 | 0 | 0 | – | | – | | – | | 10 | 2 |
| Ural Sverdlovsk Oblast | 2016–17 | Russian Premier League | 21 | 4 | 2 | 0 | – | | – | | – | | 23 | 4 |
| Ararat Moscow | 2017–18 | Russian Professional Football League | 8 | 9 | 2 | 0 | – | | – | | – | | 10 | 8 |
| Znamya Noginsk | 2020-21 | Russian Professional Football League | 23 | 17 | 3 | 1 | – | | – | | – | | 26 | 18 |
| Znamya Noginsk | 2022-23 | Russian Professional Football League | 16 | 12 | 5 | 3 | – | | – | | – | | 21 | 15 |
| Znamya Noginsk | 2022-23 | Russian Second League | 9 | 3 | – | | – | | – | | – | | 9 | 3 |
| Znamya Noginsk | Total | | 48 | 32 | 8 | 4 | – | | – | | – | | 56 | 36 |
| Career total | | | 484 | 177 | 50 | 17 | 11 | 9 | 42 | 20 | 2 | 0 | 579 | 223 |

=== International ===
Scores and results list Russia's goal tally first, score column indicates score after each Pavlyuchenko goal.

List of international goals scored by Roman Pavlyuchenko
| Goal | Date | Venue | Opponent | Score | Result | Competition |
|---|---|---|---|---|---|---|
| 1 | 8 October 2005 | Lokomotiv Stadium, Moscow, Russia | Luxembourg | 3–1 | 5–1 | 2006 FIFA World Cup qualification |
| 2 | 22 August 2007 | Lokomotiv Stadium, Moscow, Russia | Poland | 2–0 | 2–2 | Friendly match |
| 3 | 17 October 2007 | Luzhniki Stadium, Moscow, Russia | England | 1–1 | 2–1 | UEFA Euro 2008 qualification |
| 4 | 17 October 2007 | Luzhniki Stadium, Moscow, Russia | England | 2–1 | 2–1 | UEFA Euro 2008 qualification |
| 5 | 28 May 2008 | Wacker Arena, Burghausen, Germany | Serbia | 2–1 | 2–1 | Friendly match |
| 6 | 4 June 2008 | Wacker Arena, Burghausen, Germany | Lithuania | 3–1 | 4–1 | Friendly match |
| 7 | 10 June 2008 | Tivoli-Neu, Innsbruck, Austria | Spain | 3–1 | 4–1 | UEFA Euro 2008 |
| 8 | 18 June 2008 | Tivoli-Neu, Innsbruck, Austria | Sweden | 1–0 | 2–0 | UEFA Euro 2008 |
| 9 | 21 June 2008 | St. Jakob-Park, Basel, Switzerland | Netherlands | 1–0 | 3–1 | UEFA Euro 2008 |
| 10 | 10 September 2008 | Lokomotiv Stadium, Moscow, Russia | Wales | 1–0 | 2–1 | 2010 FIFA World Cup qualification |
| 11 | 28 March 2009 | Luzhniki Stadium, Moscow, Russia | Azerbaijan | 1–0 | 2–0 | 2010 FIFA World Cup qualification |
| 12 | 12 August 2009 | Lokomotiv Stadium, Moscow, Russia | Argentina | 2–3 | 2–3 | Friendly match |
| 14 | 5 September 2009 | Petrovsky Stadium, Saint Petersburg, Russia | Liechtenstein | 3–0 | 3–0 | 2010 FIFA World Cup qualification |
| 15 | 9 September 2009 | Millennium Stadium, Cardiff, Wales | Wales | 3–1 | 3–1 | 2010 FIFA World Cup qualification |
| 16 | 29 March 2011 | Jassim Bin Hamad Stadium, Doha, Qatar | Qatar | 1–1 | 1–1 | Friendly match |
| 17 | 4 June 2011 | Petrovsky Stadium, Saint Petersburg, Russia | Armenia | 1–1 | 3–1 | UEFA Euro 2012 qualification |
| 18 | 4 June 2011 | Petrovsky Stadium, Saint Petersburg, Russia | Armenia | 2–1 | 3–1 | UEFA Euro 2012 qualification |
| 19 | 4 June 2011 | Petrovsky Stadium, Saint Petersburg, Russia | Armenia | 3–1 | 3–1 | UEFA Euro 2012 qualification |
| 20 | 11 October 2011 | Luzhniki Stadium, Moscow, Russia | Andorra | 3–0 | 6–0 | UEFA Euro 2012 qualification |
| 21 | 8 June 2012 | Municipal Stadium, Wroclaw, Poland | Czech Republic | 4–1 | 4–1 | UEFA Euro 2012 |

== Honours ==
Spartak Moscow

- Russian Cup: 2002–03

Tottenham Hotspur

- Football League Cup runner-up: 2008–09

Lokomotiv Moscow

- Russian Cup: 2014–15

Russia

- UEFA European Championship bronze medalist: 2008

Individual

- Russian Premier League top goalscorer: 2006 (18 goals in 27 matches), 2007 (14 goals in 22 matches)*
- UEFA Euro Team of the Tournament: 2008
- Football League Cup top goalscorer: 2008–09

(* Jointly shared with Roman Adamov)
