= Anton Sakharov =

Russian footballer

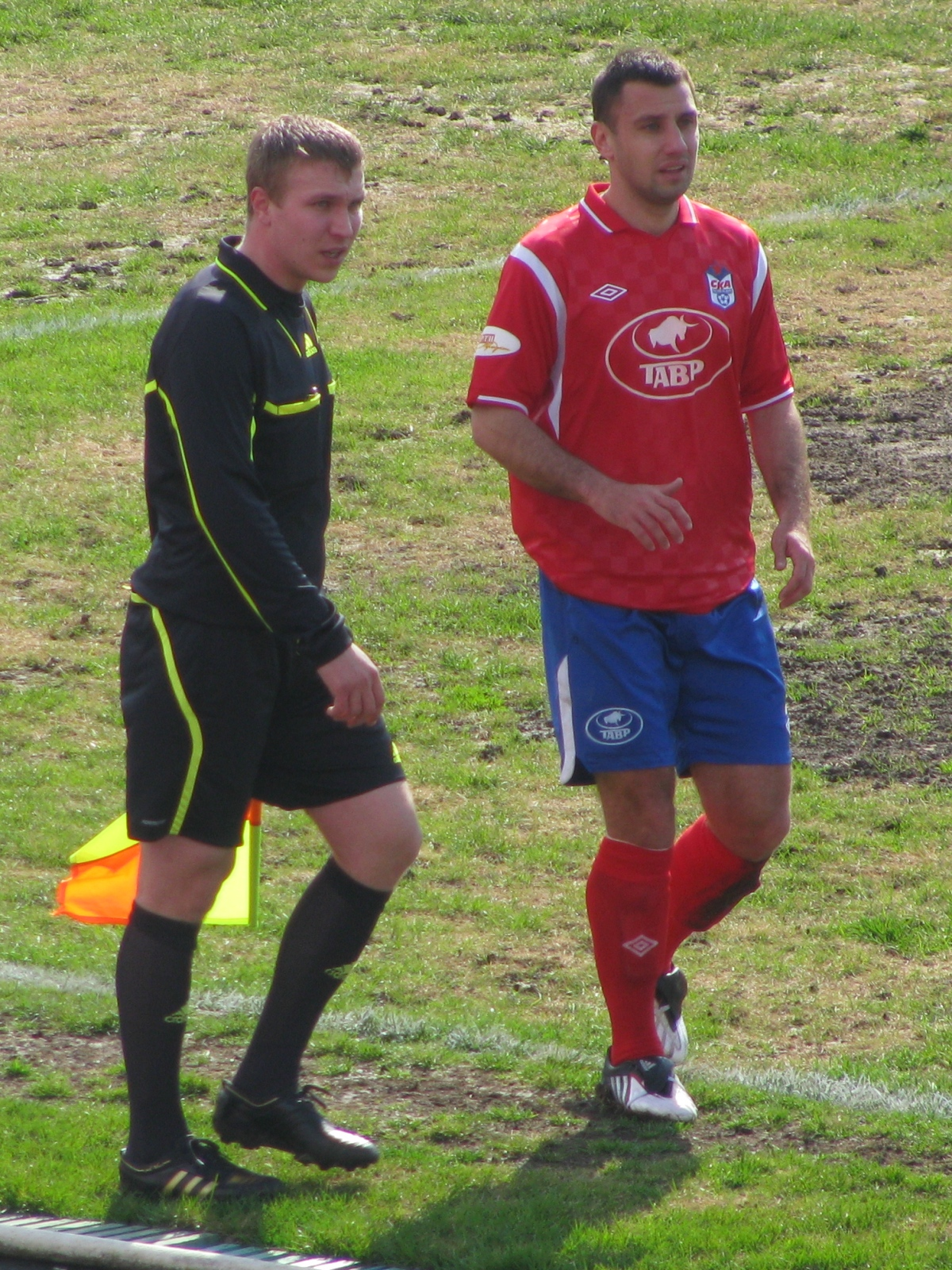
- Anton Sakharov (on the right)

Personal information
- Full name: Anton Aleksandrovich Sakharov
- Date of birth: 20 October 1982 (age 44)
- Place of birth: Volgograd, Soviet Union
- Height: 1.77 m (5 ft 10 in)
- Position: Defender

Youth career
- 1998–1999: Olimpia Volgograd

Senior career*
| Years | Team | Apps | (Gls) |
| 1999–2000 | Olimpia Volgograd | 32 | (1) |
| 2001 | Torpedo Volzhsky | 14 | (0) |
| 2002–2004 | Uralan Elista | 35 | (0) |
| 2005 | Sokol Saratov | 35 | (1) |
| 2006 | Irtysh Pavlodar | 0 | (0) |
| 2007–2008 | BATE Borisov | 22 | (0) |
| 2009 | Chernomorets Novorossiysk | 14 | (0) |
| 2009 | Gazovik Orenburg | 5 | (0) |
| 2010 | SOYUZ-Gazprom Izhevsk | 3 | (0) |
| 2011 | SKA Rostov-on-Don | 17 | (0) |
| 2012 | Energiya Volzhsky | 6 | (0) |
| 2012 | Olimpia Volgograd | 1 | (0) |
- * Club domestic league appearances and goals

Anton Aleksandrovich Sakharov (Russian: Антон Александрович Сахаров; born 20 October 1982 in Volgograd) is a former Russian footballer (defender). He last played in the Russian Second Division for FC Olimpia Volgograd. Sakharov played for Uralan Elista in the Russian Premier League during the 2003 season.
