= Vladyslav Vashchuk =

Ukrainian footballer

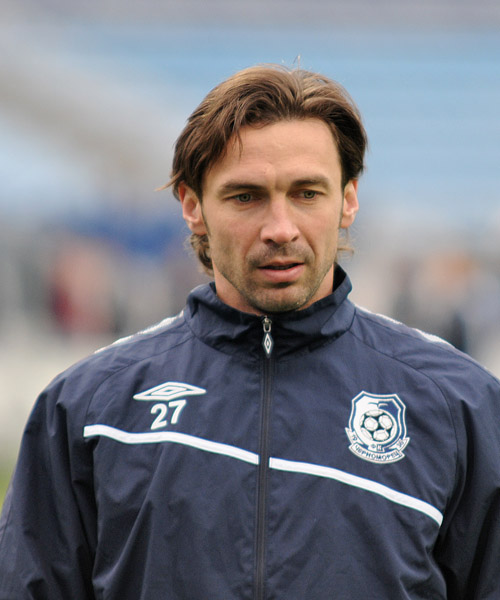
- Vashchuk in 2009

Personal information
- Full name: Vladyslav Viktorovych Vashchuk
- Date of birth: 2 January 1975 (age 51)
- Place of birth: Kyiv, Soviet Union (now Ukraine)
- Height: 1.80 m (5 ft 11 in)
- Position: Centre back

Youth career
- 1988–1992: Dynamo Kyiv

Senior career*
Years	Team	Apps	(Gls)
1992–1993	Dynamo-3 Kyiv	13	(0)
1993–2003	Dynamo Kyiv	200	(8)
2003–2004	Spartak Moscow	25	(1)
2004–2005	Chornomorets Odesa	24	(1)
2005–2008	Dynamo Kyiv	37	(1)
2008–2009	Lviv	18	(2)
2009–2010	Chornomorets Odesa	30	(3)
2010–2011	Volyn Lutsk	24	(1)
Total		361	(17)

International career
1992–1996	Ukraine-21	22	(0)
1996–2007	Ukraine	63	(1)

Managerial career
- 2013: Arsenal Kyiv (sportive director)
- * Club domestic league appearances and goals as of 21 May 2011

Vladyslav Viktorovych Vashchuk (Ukrainian: Владислав Вікторович Ващук; born 2 January 1975) is a retired Ukrainian football defender who last played for FC Volyn Lutsk.

Vashchuk was also a member of the Ukraine national football team playing 63 times. He mainly played in the centre back position and could also be utilized as a sweeper.

== Career ==
=== Club career ===
Vashchuk began his playing days in the Dynamo Kyiv football academy. He made his senior team debut in 1993, and went on to play for them for the next 10 seasons. In 2003, he spent a single season playing in Russia with Spartak Moscow, moving back to Ukraine with FC Chornomorets Odesa for the following, 2004/05 season. After playing 6 games in the 2005/06 season he moved back to Dynamo Kyiv. With Dynamo he won a total of 9 Ukrainian Premier League titles, 6 Ukrainian Cup, and 1 Ukrainian Super Cup. In the summer of 2008 he signed a 1-year deal with newly promoted FC Lviv which only lasted for 6 months. On 11 March 2009 he signed a contract for the remainder of the season with FC Chornomorets Odesa. At the end of the 2008/09 season his contract ran out and he was released as a free agent. Vashchuk then rejoined Chornomorets for the 2009–10 season, but left again at season end.

=== International career ===
Vashchuk began his International career with the Ukraine Under-21 team, making 22 appearances for them. Since 1996 he has played for the senior team. In 2006, he was chosen to play in Ukraine's first ever World Cup finals tournament. Vashchuk received a red card in his first game at the tournament from Swiss referee Massimo Busacca in a controversial decision. A penalty kick was awarded to Spain in the 47th minute because of the alleged infraction, despite multiple camera angles which indicated no physical contact between the players in the penalty area.

== Career statistics ==
=== Club ===
Club	Season	League		Cup		Europe		Total	
Club	Season	Apps	Goals	Apps	Goals	Apps	Goals	Apps	Goals
Dynamo	1993–94	24	0	4	1	-	-	28	1
Dynamo	1994–95	31	3	6	0	7	0	44	3
Dynamo	1995–96	10	0	-	-	-	-	10	0
Dynamo	1996–97	21	2	1	0	2	0	25	2
Dynamo	1997–98	23	1	4	0	9	1	36	2
Dynamo	1998–99	25	1	7	0	13	1	45	2
Dynamo	1999–00	20	1	2	0	12	1	34	2
Dynamo	2000–01	21	0	-	-	8	0	29	0
Dynamo	2001–02	20	0	5	0	8	0	33	0
Dynamo	2002–03	5	0	-	-	-	-	5	0
Spartak	2003	25	1	2	0	2	0	29	1
Chornomorets	2004–05	18	1	-	-	-	-	18	1
Chornomorets	2005–06	6	0	-	-	-	-	6	0
Dynamo	2005–06	24	1	3	0	-	-	27	1
Dynamo	2006–07	13	0	6	1	-	-	19	1
Dynamo	2007–08	17	0	3	0	3	1	23	1
Lviv	2008–09	11	1	1	0	-	-	12	1
Chornomorets	2008–09	8	1	-	-	-	-	8	1
Chornomorets	2009–10	22	2	-	-	-	-	22	2
Volyn	2010–11	24	1	2	0	-	-	26	1
Total for Dynamo		254	9	41	2	62	4	357	15
Career total		368	16	46	2	64	4	478	22

=== International goals ===
No.	Date	Venue	Opponent	Score	Result	Competition
1	31 March 1999	Olimpiyskyi National Sports Complex, Kyiv, Ukraine	Iceland	1–0	1–1	UEFA Euro 2000 qualifying

== Honours ==
- Ukrainian Premier League: 1993–94, 1994–95, 1995–96, 1996–97, 1997–98, 1998–99, 1999–00, 2000–2001, 2006–07
- Ukrainian Cup: 1996, 1998, 1999, 2000, 2006, 2007
- Ukrainian Super Cup: 2006

Met James Richardson (2025)
