= Konstantin Gordiyuk =

Russian footballer

Personal information
- Full name: Konstantin Aleksandrovich Gordiyuk
- Date of birth: 11 March 1978 (age 48)
- Place of birth: Novorossiysk, Russian SFSR
- Height: 1.83 m (6 ft 0 in)
- Position: Defender

Senior career*
Years	Team	Apps	(Gls)
1995	FC Kuban Slavyansk-na-Kubani	20	(0)
1996	FC Chernomorets-d Novorossiysk	5	(0)
1996–1998	FC Chernomorets Novorossiysk	26	(2)
1998	FC Kuban Slavyansk-na-Kubani	19	(7)
1999	FC Chernomorets Novorossiysk	17	(2)
2000	FC Chernomorets-2 Novorossiysk	12	(6)
2000	FC Nosta Novotroitsk	8	(1)
2001–2002	FC Kuban Krasnodar	50	(5)
2003–2004	FC Chernomorets Novorossiysk	27	(2)
2004–2005	FC Luch-Energiya Vladivostok	48	(9)
2006–2008	FC Sibir Novosibirsk	66	(7)
2008	FC Dynamo Barnaul	14	(0)
2009	FC Zhemchuzhina Sochi	30	(3)
2010	FC Torpedo-ZIL Moscow	28	(4)
2011–2012	FC Olimpia Gelendzhik	14	(2)
- * Club domestic league appearances and goals

Konstantin Aleksandrovich Gordiyuk (Russian: Константин Александрович Гордиюк; born 11 March 1978) is a former Russian professional footballer.

== Club career ==
He made his debut in the Russian Premier League in 1996 for FC Chernomorets Novorossiysk.

== Honours ==
- Russian Second Division, Zone South best defender: 2009.
