= Aleksandr Nevokshonov =

Russian footballer

Personal information
- Full name: Aleksandr Petrovich Nevokshonov
- Date of birth: 29 December 1984 (age 41)
- Place of birth: Yelets, Lipetsk Oblast, Russian SFSR
- Height: 1.95 m (6 ft 5 in)
- Position: Goalkeeper

Youth career
- Orlyonok Yelets

Senior career*
Years	Team	Apps	(Gls)
2000–2002	FC Yelets	14	(0)
2003	FC Shinnik Yaroslavl	0	(0)
2003–2004	FC Spartak Moscow	0	(0)
2006–2009	FC SKA-Energiya Khabarovsk	80	(0)
2011–2012	FC Yelets (amateur)		
2012	FK Spartaks Jūrmala	5	(0)
2013	FC Yelets (amateur)		
2015–2017	FC Yelets (amateur)		
- * Club domestic league appearances and goals

Aleksandr Petrovich Nevokshonov (Russian: Александр Петрович Невокшонов; born 29 December 1984) is a former Russian professional football player.

== Club career ==
After his return 2010 to FC Yelets Nevokshonov was transferred to the Latvian Higher League club FK Spartaks Jūrmala. He was mainly used as a reserve keeper, making 5 league appearances during 2 seasons at the club.

He played 3 seasons in the Russian Football National League for FC SKA-Energiya Khabarovsk.
