= Maksim Kabanov =

Russian footballer

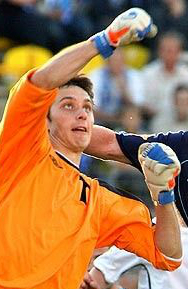
- Maksim Kabanov in action for FC Torpedo Moscow, 2006

Personal information
- Full name: Maksim Borisovich Kabanov
- Date of birth: 30 December 1982 (age 43)
- Place of birth: Moscow, Soviet Union
- Height: 1.92 m (6 ft 4 in)
- Position: Goalkeeper

Youth career
- Spartak Moscow

Senior career*
Years	Team	Apps	(Gls)
2000	FC Spartak-2 Moscow	21	(0)
2001	FC Spartak Moscow	3	(0)
2002–2003	FC Fakel Voronezh	43	(0)
2004–2007	FC Torpedo Moscow	23	(0)
2008–2009	FC SKA-Energiya Khabarovsk	48	(0)
2010	FC Rostov	0	(0)
2010	→ FC Salyut Belgorod (loan)	3	(0)
2011–2013	FC Volgar Astrakhan	52	(0)
2013–2014	FC SKA-Energiya Khabarovsk	11	(0)

International career
2003	Russia U-21	1	(0)
- * Club domestic league appearances and goals

Maksim Borisovich Kabanov (Russian: Максим Борисович Кабанов; born 30 December 1982) is a Russian former footballer.

== Club career ==
A youth product of FC Spartak Moscow, he joined FC Fakel Voronezh on loan in February 2002.

In December 2003, he signed a 5-year contract with FC Torpedo Moscow.

He played 2 games in the UEFA Champions League 2001–02 for FC Spartak Moscow.

== Honours ==
- Russian Premier League champion: 2001.

== Personal life ==
He is the older brother of Sergei Kabanov.
