= Szabolcs Sáfár =

Hungarian footballer

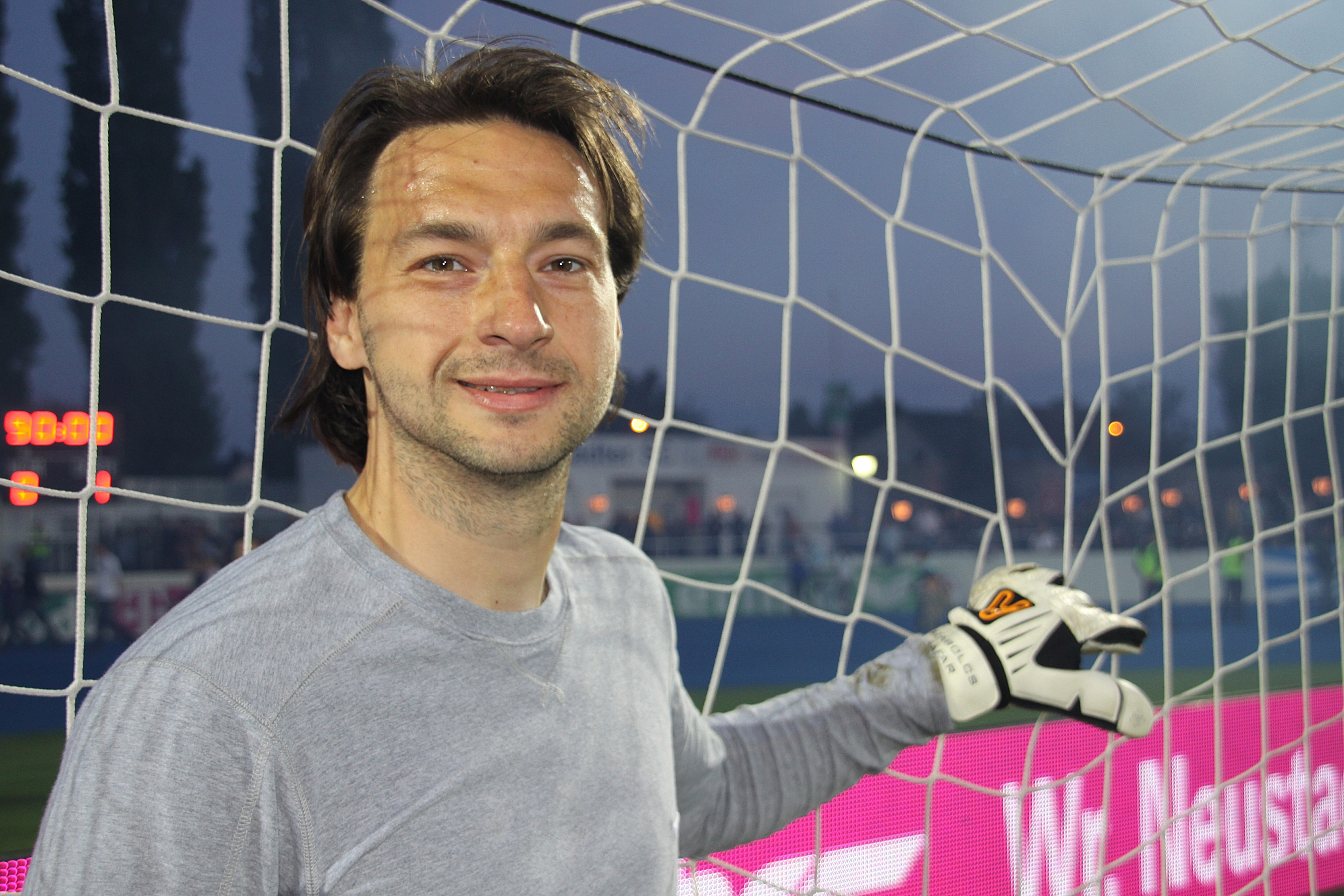

Personal information
- Date of birth: 20 August 1974 (age 52)
- Place of birth: Budapest, Hungary
- Height: 1.89 m (6 ft 2 1/2 in)
- Position: Goalkeeper

Youth career
- –1992: Vasas

Senior career*
Years	Team	Apps	(Gls)
1992–1997	Vasas	111	(0)
1997–2003	Austria Salzburg	183	(0)
2003	Spartak Moskva	5	(0)
2004–2011	Austria Wien	166	(0)
2011–2014	Wacker Innsbruck	95	(0)
2014–2017	SC Ritzing	77	(0)
2017–2019	SK Wullersdorf	43	(0)
Total		680	(0)

International career
1996–2001	Hungary	14	(0)
- * Club domestic league appearances and goals

Szabolcs Sáfár (born 20 August 1974 in Budapest) is a former Hungarian football goalkeeper.

He obtained 14 caps in the Hungary national team, and appeared at the 1996 Summer Olympics in Atlanta, where Hungary progress end in the group stage.

== Coaching career ==
Austria Wien hired Sáfár a goalkeeping coach for their youth section. He is the goalkeeping coach for the U15, U16, U17, and U18 teams.

== Honours ==
Austria Wien

- Austrian Football Bundesliga: 2005-2006
- Austrian Cup: 2004-2005, 2005–06, 2006-2007, 2008-2009
