= Vadim Karlashchuk =

Russian footballer

Personal information
- Full name: Vadim Nikolayevich Karlashchuk
- Date of birth: 30 July 1984 (age 42)
- Place of birth: Volgograd, Russian SFSR
- Height: 1.83 m (6 ft 0 in)
- Positions: Defender; midfielder

Youth career
- FC Olimpia Volgograd

Senior career*
Years	Team	Apps	(Gls)
2001–2002	FC Olimpia Volgograd	1	(0)
2003	FC Shinnik Yaroslavl	0	(0)
2003–2004	FC Spartak Moscow	0	(0)
2005	FC Arsenal Kharkiv	1	(0)
2005	FC Spartak-Molodyozhnaya Moscow		
2007–2008	FC Reutov	31	(0)
2009–2014	FC Astrakhan	147	(8)

International career
2003	Russia U-21	2	(0)
- * Club domestic league appearances and goals

Vadim Nikolayevich Karlashchuk (Russian: Вадим Николаевич Карлащук; born 30 July 1984) is a Russian former professional football player.
