= Luizão (footballer, born 1980) =

Brazilian footballer

Personal information
- Full name: Osvaldo Luiz Pereira
- Date of birth: 8 November 1980 (age 46)
- Place of birth: Bebedouro, Brazil
- Height: 1.82 m (6 ft 0 in)
- Position: Defender

Youth career
- Corinthians

Senior career*
Years	Team	Apps	(Gls)
1999	Atlético Paranaense		
1999	Tanabi		
2000–2001	Juventus		
2001	Santa Cruz	1	(0)
2002–2003	Juventus		
2003	Spartak Moscow	18	(0)
2004–2005	Khimki	0	(0)
2006	Vila Nova		
2006	São Caetano	4	(0)
2007–2008	Juventus		
2008	Náutico		
2009	Rio Claro		
2009–2010	Mogi Mirim	10	(0)
2011	América-RN	6	(1)
2012	ABC		
2012	Icasa	2	(1)
- * Club domestic league appearances and goals

Osvaldo Luiz Pereira (born 8 November 1980), known as Luizão, is a Brazilian former professional footballer.

== Club career ==
He made his debut in the Russian Premier League in 2003 for FC Spartak Moscow.

== Honours ==
- Russian Cup winner: 2003.
