= Róbson Lopes =

Brazilian footballer

Personal information
- Full name: Róbson Lopes da Silva
- Date of birth: 17 January 1975 (age 51)
- Place of birth: Diadema, São Paulo, Brazil
- Height: 1.77 m (5 ft 9 1/2 in)
- Position: Midfielder

Senior career*
Years	Team	Apps	(Gls)
1995	Flamengo	5	(0)
2002	Atlético Paranaense		
2003	FC Chernomorets Novorossiysk	8	(0)
2003	Vasco da Gama		
2007	Bragantino		
2007	América	2	(0)
- * Club domestic league appearances and goals

Róbson Lopes da Silva (born 17 January 1975 in Diadema, São Paulo) is a former Brazilian football player.
