= Abdelillah Bagui =

Moroccan footballer

Abdelilah Bagui
Personal information
- Date of birth: 17 February 1978 (age 48)
- Place of birth: Bensouda, Fes, Morocco
- Height: 1.90 m (6 ft 3 in)
- Position: Goalkeeper

Senior career*
Years	Team	Apps	(Gls)
1996–2003	Maghreb de Fès		
2003	Spartak Moscow	6	(0)
2004	Raja CA		
2005–2006	Rostov	20	(0)
2007–2008	Maghreb de Fès		
2008–2010	Kawkab Marrakech	22	(0)
2010–2011	CRA		
2011–2013	Olympic Safi	12	(0)
2013	KAC Kénitra	3	(0)

International career
1999–2008	Morocco	15	(0)
- * Club domestic league appearances and goals

Abdelilah Bagui (Arabic: عبد الإله باغي; born 17 February 1978) is a Moroccan former footballer.

Bagui played for FC Spartak Moscow and FC Rostov in the Russian Premier League.

== Career statistics ==
=== International ===
Morocco
Year	Apps	Goals
2001	4	0
2002	6	0
2003	3	0
2004	0	0
2005	1	0
2006	0	0
2007	0	0
2008	1	0
Total	15	0

Statistics accurate as of match played 12 January 2008
