= Edik Korchagin =

Russian footballer (born 1979)

Personal information
- Full name: Eduard Sergeevich Korchagin
- Date of birth: 16 January 1979 (age 47)
- Place of birth: Mozdok, Russian SFSR
- Height: 1.79 m (5 ft 10 in)
- Position: Forward

Senior career*
Years	Team	Apps	(Gls)
1994	Iriston Mozdok	5	(3)
1994–1998	Saint-Étienne	0	(0)
1998–2001	MVV Maastricht	27	(4)
2000–2001	→ AB (loan)	18	(4)
2001–2003	PSV Eindhoven	0	(0)
2003–2004	Dynamo Moscow	39	(12)
2005	Shinnik Yaroslavl	16	(1)
2006	Spartak Nalchik	28	(5)
2007–2008	Lokomotiv Moscow	6	(0)
2008	→ Torpedo Moscow (loan)	14	(4)
2009	Zelenograd	13	(3)
2010–2012	Volga Tver	68	(11)
2012–2014	Dolgoprudny	52	(9)
Total		286	(56)

International career
1998–2000	Russia U21	5	(0)
- * Club domestic league appearances and goals

Eduard Sergeyevich Korchagin (Russian: Эрик Серге́евич Корчагин; born 16 January 1979), known as Edik Korchagin, is a Russian former footballer. He played as a forward.
