= 2003 FC Zenit Saint Petersburg season =

FC Zenit Saint Petersburg
2003 season
- Manager: Vlastimil Petržela
- Stadium: Petrovsky Stadium
- Premier League: 2nd
- Russian Cup: Progressed to 2004 season
- Top goalscorer: League: Aleksandr Kerzhakov (13); All: Aleksandr Kerzhakov (16)

The 2003 Zenit St.Petersburg season was the club's ninth season in the Russian Premier League, the highest tier of association football in Russia.

== Squad ==
As of match played 1 November 2003

No.	Name	Nationality	Position	Date of birth (age)	Signed from	Signed in	Contract ends	Apps.	Goals
Goalkeepers
1	Kamil Čontofalský	(Slovakia)	GK	3 June 1978 (aged 25)	Bohemians 1905	2003		4	0
16	Vyacheslav Malafeev	(Russia)	GK	4 March 1979 (aged 24)	Youth Team	1999		124	0
28	Sergei Losev	(Russia)	GK	31 July 1983 (aged 20)	Youth Team	2001			
31	Sergey Ivanov	(Russia)	GK	16 June 1984 (aged 19)	Youth Team	2001			
Defenders
3	Martin Horák	(Czech Republic)	DF	16 September 1980 (aged 23)	Sparta Prague	2003		21	2
5	Aleksei Igonin	(Russia)	DF	18 March 1976 (aged 27)	Youth Team	1995			
8	Pavel Mareš	(Czech Republic)	DF	18 January 1976 (aged 27)	Sparta Prague	2003		26	3
17	Milan Vještica	(Serbia and Montenegro)	DF	15 November 1979 (aged 23)	Vojvodina	2002		42	3
20	Aleksei Katulsky	(Russia)	DF	18 January 1976 (aged 27)	Youth Team	1996			
22	Valeri Tsvetkov	(Russia)	DF	5 November 1977 (aged 25)	Pskov	2000			
25	Daniel Chiriță	(Romania)	DF	24 March 1974 (aged 29)	Shakhtar Donetsk	2002		35	2
30	Maxim Usanov	(Russia)	DF	5 March 1985 (aged 18)	Youth Team	2003		0	0
32	Dmitri Vasilyev	(Russia)	DF	18 April 1983 (aged 20)	Youth Team	2001			
38	Igor Nedorezov	(Russia)	DF	27 June 1981 (aged 22)	FC Pskov	2000			
41	Ivan Lozenkov	(Russia)	DF	14 April 1984 (aged 19)	Youth Team	2003		0	0
44	Nikolai Yefimov	(Russia)	DF	21 March 1984 (aged 19)	Youth Team	2002		0	0
46	Konstantin Lobov	(Russia)	DF	2 May 1981 (aged 22)	Youth Team	1998			
Midfielders
2	Vladislav Radimov	(Russia)	MF	26 November 1975 (aged 27)	Krylia Sovetov	2003		24	3
6	Oleksandr Spivak	(Ukraine)	MF	6 January 1975 (aged 28)	Metalurh Zaporizhya	2000			
9	Radek Šírl	(Czech Republic)	MF	20 March 1981 (aged 22)	Sparta Prague	2003		18	1
10	Andrey Arshavin	(Russia)	MF	29 May 1981 (aged 22)	Youth Team	1999		111	16
18	Valentin Filatov	(Russia)	MF	19 March 1982 (aged 21)	Youth Team	2001			
27	Igor Denisov	(Russia)	MF	17 May 1984 (aged 19)	Youth Team	2002		22	3
29	Sergei Vasyanovich	(Russia)	MF	8 July 1982 (aged 21)	Youth Team	2000			
34	Vladimir Bystrov	(Russia)	MF	31 January 1984 (aged 19)	Youth Team	2001			
35	Viktor Lopatyonok	(Russia)	MF	18 February 1984 (aged 19)	Youth Team	2002		0	0
42	Yaroslav Kanavchenko	(Russia)	MF	21 April 1985 (aged 18)	Youth Team	2002		0	0
43	Oleg Vlasov	(Russia)	MF	10 December 1984 (aged 18)	Metallurg Pikalyovo	2002		0	0
44	Maksim Mosin	(Russia)	MF	16 February 1982 (aged 21)	Youth Team	1999			
45	Konstantin Konoplyov	(Russia)	MF	13 May 1980 (aged 23)	Youth Team	1998			
47	Darius Miceika	(Lithuania)	MF	22 February 1983 (aged 20)	Žalgiris	2002		13	2
48	Stanislav Miloserdov	(Russia)	MF	24 January 1984 (aged 19)	Youth Team	2002		0	0
49	Yevgeny Levandovsky	(Russia)	MF	5 February 1983 (aged 20)	Youth Team	2002		0	0
50	Semyon Melnikov	(Russia)	MF	27 January 1985 (aged 18)	Youth Team	2002		1	0
Forwards
11	Aleksandr Kerzhakov	(Russia)	FW	27 November 1982 (aged 20)	Youth Team	2001		95	40
15	Lukáš Hartig	(Czech Republic)	FW	28 October 1976 (aged 27)	Bohemians 1905	2003		12	1
19	Maksim Astafyev	(Russia)	FW	8 December 1982 (aged 20)	Youth Team	2000			
23	Andrei Nikolayev	(Russia)	FW	30 August 1982 (aged 20)	Sheksna Cherepovets	2001			
24	Predrag Ranđelović	(Serbia and Montenegro)	FW	13 September 1976 (aged 26)	CSKA Moscow	2002		15	4
26	Dmitri Makarov	(Russia)	FW	16 September 1982 (aged 21)	Youth Team	2000			
Away on loan
Left during the season
4	Sargis Hovsepyan	(Armenia)	DF	2 November 1972 (aged 30)	Pyunik	1998			
7	Sergei Osipov	(Russia)	FW	10 July 1978 (aged 25)	Youth Team	1996			

== Transfers ==
=== In ===
Date	Position	Nationality	Name	From	Fee	Ref.
Winter 2003	GK	(Slovakia)	Kamil Čontofalský	Bohemians 1905		
Winter 2003	DF	(Czech Republic)	Martin Horák	Sparta Prague		
Winter 2003	DF	(Czech Republic)	Pavel Mareš	Sparta Prague		
Winter 2003	MF	(Czech Republic)	Radek Šírl	Sparta Prague		
Winter 2003	MF	(Russia)	Vladislav Radimov	Krylia Sovetov		
Winter 2003	FW	(Czech Republic)	Lukáš Hartig	Bohemians 1905		

=== Out ===
Date	Position	Nationality	Name	To	Fee	Ref.
Winter 2003	GK	(Russia)	Aleksandr Makarov	Anzhi Makhachkala		
Winter 2003	DF	(Russia)	Dmitri Davydov	Metallurg Lipetsk		
Winter 2003	DF	(Russia)	Konstantin Lepyokhin	Dynamo St.Petersburg		
Winter 2003	MF	(Belarus)	Barys Haravoy	Torpedo Metallurg		
Winter 2003	MF	(Romania)	Zeno Bundea	Universitatea Craiova		
Winter 2003	MF	(Russia)	Dzhambulad Bazayev	Saturn		
Winter 2003	MF	(Russia)	Aleksei Lazarev	Metallurg Lipetsk		
Winter 2003	MF	(Russia)	Denis Ugarov	Metallurg Lipetsk		
Winter 2003	MF	(Serbia and Montenegro)	Vladimir Mudrinić	Sartid Smederevo		
Winter 2003	FW	(Belarus)	Dzmitry Aharodnik	Metallurg Lipetsk		
Summer 2003	DF	(Armenia)	Sargis Hovsepyan	Torpedo Metallurg		
Summer 2003	FW	(Russia)	Sergei Osipov	Torpedo Moscow		

=== Released ===
Date	Position	Nationality	Name	Joined	Date	Ref.
Winter 2013	DF	(Russia)	Mikhail Yakovenko			
Winter 2013	DF	(Russia)	Dmitri Vasilyev			
Winter 2013	FW	(Russia)	Semyon Melnikov	Dynamo St.Petersburg		

== Competitions ==
=== Overall record ===
Competition	First match	Last match	Starting round	Final position	Record							
Competition	First match	Last match	Starting round	Final position	Pld	W	D	L	GF	GA	GD	Win %
Premier League	15 March 2003	1 November 2003	Matchday 1	2nd	30	16	8	6	48	32	+16	53.33
2003–04 Russian Cup	14 October 2003	see 2004 season	Round of 32	Round of 16	3	2	1	0	8	2	+6	66.67
Total					33	18	9	6	56	34	+22	54.55

Last updated: 1 November 2003
Source: #Competitions

=== Premier League ===
==== Results by round ====
Round	1	2	3	4	5	6	7	8	9	10	11	12	13	14	15	16	17	18	19	20	21	22	23	24	25	26	27	28	29	30
Ground	H	A	H	A	H	A	H	A	H	A	A	A	H	A	H	A	H	A	H	A	H	H	H	A	H	A	H	A	H	A
Result	W	W	D	L	W	D	D	L	W	L	L	W	W	L	W	D	D	W	W	W	L	W	D	W	W	W	W	D	D	W

Updated to match(es) played on 1 November 2003. Source: See Results
A = Away; H = Home; W = Win; D = Draw; L = Loss

==== Results ====
15 March 2003 1	Zenit St.Petersburg	2 – 1	Saturn	Saint Petersburg
16:00 MSK (UTC+3)	Katulsky 20' (yellow card) 54'; Chiriță (yellow card) 37' (yellow-red card) 90'; Hovsepyan (yellow card) 49'; Hartig (yellow card) 52'; Kerzhakov 61' (yellow card) 84'; Šírl (yellow card) 63'	Report	Horshkov (yellow card) 34'; Rogaciov 39' (pen.); Sosnovschi (yellow card) 52'; Géder (yellow card) 73'; Hidalgo (yellow card) 84'	Stadium: Petrovsky Stadium; Attendance: 21,400; Referee: Valentin Ivanov

22 March 2003 2	Lokomotiv Moscow	1 – 2	Zenit St.Petersburg	Moscow
16:00 MSK (UTC+3)	Pimenov 11' (yellow card) 83'; Sennikov (yellow card) 25' (yellow-red card) 82'; Loskov (yellow card) 40'; Maminov (yellow card) 42'; Júlio César (yellow card) 45+'	Report	Spivak (yellow card) 40'; Konoplyov 41'; Hartig (yellow card) 56'; Kerzhakov 63'	Stadium: RZD Arena; Attendance: 6,000; Referee: Igor Egorov

6 April 2003 3	Zenit St.Petersburg	0 – 0	Rostov	Saint Petersburg
16:00 MSK (DST) (UTC+4)	Arshavin (yellow card) 43'; Mareš (yellow card) 63'	Report	Osinov (yellow card) 14'; Rogochiy (yellow card) 24'; Booth (yellow card) 75'; Maksymov (yellow card) 86'	Stadium: Petrovsky Stadium; Attendance: 22,000; Referee: Alexander Kolobaev

12 April 2003 4	Chernomorets Novorossiysk	1 – 0	Zenit St.Petersburg	Novorossiysk
16:00 MSK (DST) (UTC+4)	Levytskyi (yellow card) 16'; Ivanov (yellow card) 21'; Robson Carioca (yellow card) 78'; Varlamov 90+'; Piyuk (yellow card) 90+'	Report	Konoplyov (yellow card) 33'; Vještica (yellow card) 88'; Osipov (yellow card) 90+'	Stadium: Central Stadium; Attendance: 12,500; Referee: Sergei Martynov

19 April 2003 5	Zenit St.Petersburg	1 – 0	Rubin Kazan	Saint Petersburg
16:00 MSK (DST) (UTC+4)	Radimov (yellow card) 23'; Šírl 48' (yellow card) 63'; Horák (yellow card) 62'	Report	Sibaya (yellow card) 21'; Scotti (yellow card) 31'; Čížek (yellow card) 53'; Sinyov (yellow card) 80'	Stadium: Petrovsky Stadium; Attendance: 21,000; Referee: Alexander Gonchar

23 April 2003 6	Spartak Moscow	1 – 1	Zenit St.Petersburg	Moscow
17:00 MSK (DST) (UTC+4)	Pavlyuchenko (yellow card) 16'; Pavlenko 27'; Luizão (yellow card) 36'; Kébé (yellow card) 60'	Report	Spivak 15' (pen.); Hovsepyan (yellow card) 26'; Igonin (yellow card) 74'; Radimov (yellow card) 90'; Vještica (yellow card) 90+'	Stadium: Eduard Streltsov Stadium; Attendance: 8,200; Referee: Alexander Evstigneev

4 May 2003 7	Zenit St.Petersburg	0 – 0	Rotor Volgograd	Saint Petersburg
16:00 MSK (DST) (UTC+4)	Šírl (yellow card) 49'; Hovsepyan (yellow card) 58'	Report	Olenikov (yellow card) 39'; Trifonov (yellow card) 86'	Stadium: Petrovsky Stadium; Attendance: 15,000; Referee: Aleksei Nikolaev

10 May 2003 8	Dynamo Moscow	7 – 1	Zenit St.Petersburg	Moscow
16:00 MSK (DST) (UTC+4))	Koroman 20', 27'; Bulykin 23', 60' (yellow card) 41'; Korchagin 46', 50', 58'; Tochilin (yellow card) 55'	Report	Spivak (yellow card) 62'; Kerzhakov 80'	Stadium: Dynamo Stadium; Attendance: 7,000; Referee: Aleksandr Gvardis

17 May 2003 9	Zenit St.Petersburg	1 – 0	Torpedo Moscow	Saint Petersburg
16:00 MSK (DST) (UTC+4)	Chiriță (yellow card) 10'; Igonin (yellow card) 13'; Osipov (yellow card) 35'; Hovsepyan (yellow card) 43'; Hartig 62'	Report	Makhmutov (yellow card) 38'; Lukhvich (yellow card) 44'; Shirko (yellow card) 45'; Jolović (yellow card) 77'	Stadium: Petrovsky Stadium; Attendance: 17,000; Referee: Igor Egorov

24 May 2003 10	Shinnik Yaroslavl	3 – 0	Zenit St.Petersburg	Yaroslavl
16:00 MSK (DST) (UTC+4)	Vasilyev (yellow card) 17'; Khomukha 26' (pen.); Grishin 62'; Skokov 77'; Kulchy (yellow card) 88'	Report	Šírl (yellow card) 7'; Osipov (yellow card) 18'; Spivak (yellow card) 87'	Stadium: Shinnik Stadium; Attendance: 16,500; Referee: Valentin Ivanov

31 May 2003 11	Uralan Elista	1 – 0	Zenit St.Petersburg	Elista
19:00 MSK (DST) (UTC+4)	Ajinjal 6'; Semochko (yellow card) 52'; Vranješ (yellow card) 54'	Report	Igonin (yellow card) 36'; Hovsepyan (yellow card) 41'; Vještica (yellow card) 42'; Katulsky (yellow card) 57'; Mareš (yellow card) 65'	Stadium: Uralan Stadium; Attendance: 6,000; Referee: Yuri Baskakov

11 June 2003 12	Alania Vladikavkaz	0 – 2	Zenit St.Petersburg	Vladikavkaz
19:00 MSK (DST) (UTC+4)		Report	Spivak 75'; Denisov 90+'	Stadium: Republican Spartak Stadium; Attendance: 10,000; Referee: Mikhail Khodyrev

18 June 2003 13	Zenit St.Petersburg	3 – 0	Torpedo Metallurg	Saint Petersburg
19:00 MSK (DST) (UTC+4)	Spivak (yellow card) 4'; Denisov 11'; Lobov (yellow card) 61'; Makarov 62'; Vlasov 90+'	Report	Biletskyi (yellow card) 31'; Orlov (yellow card) 45'; Komadina (yellow card) 55' (yellow-red card) 66'	Stadium: Petrovsky Stadium; Attendance: 20,500; Referee: Marat Galimov

23 June 2003 14	Krylia Sovetov	2 – 1	Zenit St.Petersburg	Samara
18:00 MSK (DST) (UTC+4)	Poškus (yellow card) 26'; Souza 27'; Tikhonov 29'; Ovie (yellow card) 41'; Vinogradov (yellow card) 85'	Report	Kerzhakov 52'	Stadium: Metallurg Stadium; Attendance: 18,000; Referee: Igor Egorov

28 June 2003 15	Zenit St.Petersburg	4 – 1	CSKA Moscow	Saint Petersburg
16:00 MSK (DST) (UTC+4)	Chiriță 25'; Radimov (yellow card) 26' (goal) 55'; Vještica (yellow card) 39'; Spivak 45' (pen.); Denisov (yellow card) 69'; Kerzhakov 81'	Report	Yanovsky (yellow card) 12' (goal) 23'; Solomatin (yellow card) 30'; Kusov (yellow card) 73'; Kirichenko (yellow card) 74'; Shershun (yellow card) 76'; Yevsikov (yellow card) 90'	Stadium: Petrovsky Stadium; Attendance: 22,500; Referee: Aleksandr Gvardis

11 July 2003 16	CSKA Moscow	2 – 2	Zenit St.Petersburg	Moscow
18:00 MSK (DST) (UTC+4)	Rahimić (yellow card) 16'; Popov 32'; Gogniyev (yellow card) 63'; Solomatin (yellow card) 72'; Geynrikh 79'	Report	Kerzhakov 12'; Lobov (yellow card) 31'; Makarov (yellow card) 54'; Arshavin (yellow card) 55' (yellow-red card) 73'; Nedorezov (yellow card) 61'; Spivak 70'; Radimov (yellow card) 78'	Stadium: Dynamo Stadium; Attendance: 12,500; Referee: Alexander Evstigneev

19 July 2003 17	Zenit St.Petersburg	2 – 2	Krylia Sovetov	Saint Petersburg
16:00 MSK (DST) (UTC+4)	Mareš 18'; Spivak 45+' (pen.); Chiriță (yellow card) 54'	Report	Karyaka (yellow card) 30' (goal) 48', 72'; Kowba (yellow card) 45'; Tikhonov (yellow card) 90'	Stadium: Petrovsky Stadium; Attendance: 21,500; Referee: Mikhail Khodyrev

25 July 2003 18	Torpedo Metallurg	0 – 1	Zenit St.Petersburg	Moscow
19:00 MSK (DST) (UTC+4)	Biletskyi (yellow card) 13'; Leonov (yellow card) 80'	Report	Arshavin (yellow card) 21'; Kerzhakov (yellow card) 27'; Vlasov 88'	Stadium: Eduard Streltsov Stadium; Attendance: 4,000; Referee: Yury Chebotaryov

2 August 2003 19	Zenit St.Petersburg	2 – 1	Alania Vladikavkaz	Saint Petersburg
19:00 MSK (DST) (UTC+4)	Radimov 7', 49' (yellow card) 27'; Chiriță (yellow card) 37'; Denisov (yellow card) 77'	Report	Drozdov (yellow card) 11'; Sarkisyan (yellow card) 25'; Barasa (yellow card) 31'; Sikoyev (yellow card) 83' (goal) 90+'	Stadium: Petrovsky Stadium; Attendance: 21,000; Referee: Alexander Kolobaev

8 August 2003 20	Torpedo Moscow	1 – 2	Zenit St.Petersburg	Moscow
19:00 MSK (DST) (UTC+4)	Shirko (yellow card) 28'; Kormiltsev 41'; Jolović (yellow card) 65'; Oper (yellow card) 78'	Report	Kerzhakov 18' (yellow card) 43' (red card) 90+'; Šírl (yellow card) 49'; Bystrov 88'	Stadium: Luzhniki Stadium; Attendance: 4,000; Referee: Vladimir Pettay

16 August 2003 21	Zenit St.Petersburg	1 – 2	Shinnik Yaroslavl	Saint Petersburg
19:00 MSK (DST) (UTC+4)	Vještica (yellow card) 43' (yellow-red card) 84'; Radimov (yellow card) 43'; Nikolayev 47'	Report	Vasilyev (yellow card) 30'; Kushev (yellow card) 32' (goal) 69'; Kulchy (yellow card) 45'; Khazov 87'	Stadium: Petrovsky Stadium; Attendance: 22,000; Referee: Valentin Ivanov

24 August 2003 22	Zenit St.Petersburg	5 – 1	Uralan Elista	Saint Petersburg
19:00 MSK (DST) (UTC+4)	Kerzhakov 14', 33', 89' (pen.); Lobov (yellow card) 59'; Spivak (penalty missed) 65'; Arshavin 67', 90+'; Denisov (yellow card) 86'	Report	Ajinjal (yellow card) 17'; Dal Canto (yellow card) 37'; Vranješ (yellow card) 41'; Kolodin (yellow card) 48' (yellow-red card) 58' (goal) 54'; Geraschenko (yellow card) 64'; Tsallagov (yellow card) 82'	Stadium: Petrovsky Stadium; Attendance: 16,000; Referee: Mikhail Veselovsky

30 August 2003 23	Zenit St.Petersburg	0 – 0	Dynamo Moscow	Saint Petersburg
16:00 MSK (DST) (UTC+4)	Chiriță (yellow card) 5'; Horák (yellow card) 20'	Report	Mendy (yellow card) 4' (yellow-red card) 11'; Bratić (yellow card) 50'; Lutsenko (yellow card) 84'	Stadium: Petrovsky Stadium; Attendance: 20,000; Referee: Alexey Tyumin

13 September 2003 24	Rotor Volgograd	1 – 4	Zenit St.Petersburg	Volgograd
17:00 MSK (DST) (UTC+4)	Yesipov 61' (pen.)	Report	Mareš (yellow card) 20'; Kerzhakov 32'; Horák 37', 50'; Vještica (yellow card) 56'; Bystrov 78'	Stadium: Central Stadium; Attendance: 14,000; Referee: Yuri Baskakov

19 September 2003 25	Zenit St.Petersburg	2 – 1	Spartak Moscow	Saint Petersburg
19:00 MSK (DST) (UTC+4)	Mareš (yellow card) 20' (goal) 60'; Bystrov 31' (yellow card) 32'; Kerzhakov (yellow card) 52'; Arshavin (yellow card) 65'	Report	Mitreski (yellow card) 18'; Luizão (yellow card) 26'; Pjanović 66'; Kalynychenko (yellow card) 72'; Kovtun (yellow card) 84' (yellow-red card) 88'	Stadium: Petrovsky Stadium; Attendance: 21,000; Referee: Igor Egorov

27 September 2003 26	Rubin Kazan	1 – 2	Zenit St.Petersburg	Kazan
16:00 MSK (DST) (UTC+4)	Sinyov (yellow card) 44'; Fyodorov (yellow card) 56'; Aloísio (yellow card) 59'; Novotný (yellow card) 86' (yellow-red card) 90'; Scotti 86'; Sharonov (yellow card) 89'; Sibaya (yellow card) 90'	Report	Arshavin (yellow card) 44' (yellow-red card) 90'; Nikolayev 47'; Makarov 70'; Spivak (yellow card) 88'	Stadium: Central Stadium; Attendance: 22,000; Referee: Valentin Ivanov

4 October 2003 27	Zenit St.Petersburg	3 – 0	Chernomorets Novorossiysk	Saint Petersburg
18:00 MSK (DST) (UTC+4)	Bystrov 45' (yellow card) 53'; Kerzhakov (yellow card) 84' (goal) 84' (pen.), 87'	Report	Flávio (yellow card) 11' (yellow-red card) 42'	Stadium: Petrovsky Stadium; Attendance: 21,000; Referee: Yuri Baskakov

18 October 2003 28	Rostov	1 – 1	Zenit St.Petersburg	Rostov-on-Don
16:00 MSK (DST) (UTC+4)	Coyle (yellow card) 3'; Adamov 71'	Report	Horák (yellow card) 26'; Spivak 30'	Stadium: Olimp-2; Attendance: 7,000; Referee: Vladimir Pettay

25 October 2003 29	Zenit St.Petersburg	0 – 0	Lokomotiv Moscow	Saint Petersburg
16:00 MSK (DST) (UTC+4)	Radimov (yellow card) 55'; Horák (yellow card) 77'	Report	Sennikov (yellow card) 32' (yellow-red card) 90+'; Pashinin (yellow card) 38'; Izmailov (yellow card) 43'; Evseev (yellow card) 69'	Stadium: Petrovsky Stadium; Attendance: 21,500; Referee: Igor Egorov

1 November 2003 30	Saturn	1 – 3	Zenit St.Petersburg	Ramenskoye
16:00 MSK (UTC+3)	Géder (yellow card) 51'; Bazayev 90+'	Report	Arshavin 3', 37', 45+'	Stadium: Saturn Stadium; Attendance: 12,000; Referee: Sergei Martynov

==== Table ====
Pos	Team	Pld	W	D	L	GF	GA	GD	Pts	Qualification or relegation
1	CSKA Moscow (C)	30	17	8	5	56	32	+24	59	Qualification to Champions League second qualifying round
2	Zenit St. Petersburg	30	16	8	6	48	32	+16	56	Qualification to UEFA Cup second qualifying round
3	Rubin Kazan	30	15	8	7	44	29	+15	53	Qualification to UEFA Cup second qualifying round
4	Lokomotiv Moscow	30	15	7	8	54	33	+21	52	
5	Shinnik Yaroslavl	30	12	11	7	43	34	+9	47	Qualification to Intertoto Cup second round

Source: RFPL
Rules for classification: 1st points; 2nd matches won; 3rd head-to-head (points, matches won, goal difference, goals scored, away goals scored); 4th goal difference
(C) Champions

=== Russian Cup ===
==== 2002–03 ====
14 October 2003 Round of 32 1st leg	KAMAZ	0–2	Zenit	Naberezhnye Chelny
16:00 MSK (DST) (UTC+4)	A.Gaynullin (yellow card) 79'	Report	Nikolayev 21'; Makarov 43'; Lobov (yellow card) 80'; Chiriță (yellow card) 88'	Stadium: KAMAZ Stadium; Attendance: 6,500; Referee: Alexander Evstigneev

5 November 2003 Round of 32 2nd leg	Zenit	6–2 (8–2 agg.)	KAMAZ	Saint Petersburg
19:00 MSK (UTC+3)	Kerzhakov 20', 25', 53'; Mareš 43'; Denisov 46'; Vlasov 74'; Filatov (yellow card) 90'	Report	Gikayev 10'; Bulatov 75'; Panov (yellow card) 86'	Stadium: Petrovsky Stadium; Attendance: 12,000; Referee: Sergey Zuev

9 November 2003 Round of 16 1st leg	Krylia Sovetov	0–0	Zenit	Samara
15:00 MSK (UTC+3)		Report	Denisov (yellow card) 53'; Radimov (yellow card) 90'	Stadium: Metallurg Stadium; Attendance: 15,000; Referee: Aleksei Nikolaev

Round 16 2nd leg took place during the 2004 season.

== Squad statistics ==
As of match played 1 November 2003

=== Appearances and goals ===
No.	Pos	Nat	Player	Total		Premier League		03/04 Russian Cup	
No.	Pos	Nat	Player	Apps	Goals	Apps	Goals	Apps	Goals
1	GK	(Slovakia) SVK	Kamil Čontofalský	4	0	3	0	1	0
2	MF	(Russia) RUS	Vladislav Radimov	24	3	17+4	3	3	0
3	DF	(Czech Republic) CZE	Martin Horák	21	2	20	2	1	0
5	DF	(Russia) RUS	Aleksei Igonin	12	0	7+4	0	0+1	0
6	MF	(Ukraine) UKR	Oleksandr Spivak	28	6	25+1	6	2	0
8	DF	(Czech Republic) CZE	Pavel Mareš	26	3	25	2	1	1
9	MF	(Czech Republic) CZE	Radek Šírl	18	1	16+2	1	0	0
10	MF	(Russia) RUS	Andrey Arshavin	29	5	16+11	5	2	0
11	FW	(Russia) RUS	Aleksandr Kerzhakov	29	16	26+1	13	2	3
15	FW	(Czech Republic) CZE	Lukáš Hartig	12	1	8+4	1	0	0
16	GK	(Russia) RUS	Vyacheslav Malafeev	29	0	27	0	2	0
17	DF	(Serbia and Montenegro) SCG	Milan Vještica	31	0	27+1	0	2+1	0
18	MF	(Russia) RUS	Valentin Filatov	1	0	0	0	0+1	0
19	FW	(Russia) RUS	Maksim Astafyev	4	0	1+3	0	0	0
20	DF	(Russia) RUS	Aleksei Katulsky	20	1	9+8	1	2+1	0
22	DF	(Russia) RUS	Valeri Tsvetkov	10	0	4+4	0	2	0
23	FW	(Russia) RUS	Andrei Nikolayev	8	3	3+3	2	1+1	1
24	FW	(Serbia and Montenegro) SCG	Predrag Ranđelović	3	0	0+3	0	0	0
25	DF	(Romania) ROU	Daniel Chiriță	22	1	20+1	1	0+1	0
26	FW	(Russia) RUS	Dmitri Makarov	14	3	8+4	2	2	1
27	MF	(Russia) RUS	Igor Denisov	21	3	18+1	2	1+1	1
34	MF	(Russia) RUS	Vladimir Bystrov	19	4	12+7	4	0	0
38	DF	(Russia) RUS	Igor Nedorezov	2	0	1	0	1	0
43	MF	(Russia) RUS	Oleg Vlasov	16	3	3+10	2	2+1	1
45	MF	(Russia) RUS	Konstantin Konoplyov	18	1	12+3	1	3	0
46	DF	(Russia) RUS	Konstantin Lobov	12	0	8+1	0	3	0
47	MF	(Lithuania) LTU	Darius Miceika	1	0	0	0	0+1	0
50	FW	(Russia) RUS	Semyon Melnikov	1	0	1	0	0	0
Players who left Zenit during the season:
4	DF	(Armenia) ARM	Sargis Hovsepyan	10	0	10	0	0	0
7	FW	(Russia) RUS	Sergei Osipov	8	0	3+5	0	0	0

=== Goal scorers ===
Place	Position	Nation	Number	Name	Premier League	03/04 Russian Cup	Total
1	FW	(Russia)	11	Aleksandr Kerzhakov	13	3	16
2	MF	(Ukraine)	6	Oleksandr Spivak	6	0	6
3	MF	(Russia)	10	Andrey Arshavin	5	0	5
4	MF	(Russia)	34	Vladimir Bystrov	4	0	4
5	MF	(Russia)	2	Vladislav Radimov	3	0	3
5	MF	(Russia)	27	Igor Denisov	2	1	3
5	DF	(Czech Republic)	8	Pavel Mareš	2	1	3
5	MF	(Russia)	43	Oleg Vlasov	2	1	3
5	DF	(Russia)	23	Andrei Nikolayev	2	1	3
5	FW	(Russia)	26	Dmitri Makarov	2	1	3
11	DF	(Czech Republic)	3	Martin Horák	2	0	2
12	DF	(Russia)	20	Aleksei Katulsky	1	0	1
12	MF	(Russia)	45	Konstantin Konoplyov	1	0	1
12	MF	(Czech Republic)	9	Radek Šírl	1	0	1
12	FW	(Czech Republic)	15	Lukáš Hartig	1	0	1
12	DF	(Romania)	25	Daniel Chiriță	1	0	1
				TOTALS	48	8	56

=== Goal scorers ===
Place	Position	Nation	Number	Name	Premier League	03/04 Russian Cup	Total
1	GK	(Russia)	16	Vyacheslav Malafeev	10	1	11
2	GK	(Czech Republic)	1	Kamil Čontofalský	0	1	1
				TOTALS	10	2	12

=== Disciplinary record ===
Number	Nation	Position	Name	Premier League		03/04 Russian Cup		Total	
Number	Nation	Position	Name	Yellow card	Red card	Yellow card	Red card	Yellow card	Red card
2	(Russia)	DF	Vladislav Radimov	7	0	1	0	8	0
3	(Czech Republic)	DF	Martin Horák	4	0	0	0	4	0
5	(Russia)	DF	Aleksei Igonin	3	0	0	0	3	0
6	(Ukraine)	MF	Oleksandr Spivak	5	0	0	0	5	0
8	(Czech Republic)	DF	Pavel Mareš	4	0	0	0	4	0
9	(Czech Republic)	FW	Radek Šírl	5	0	0	0	5	0
10	(Russia)	MF	Andrey Arshavin	7	2	0	0	7	2
11	(Russia)	FW	Aleksandr Kerzhakov	5	1	0	0	5	1
15	(Czech Republic)	FW	Lukáš Hartig	2	0	0	0	2	0
17	(Serbia and Montenegro)	DF	Milan Vještica	7	1	0	0	7	1
18	(Russia)	MF	Valentin Filatov	0	0	1	0	1	0
20	(Russia)	DF	Aleksei Katulsky	2	0	0	0	2	0
25	(Romania)	DF	Daniel Chiriță	6	1	1	0	7	1
26	(Russia)	FW	Dmitri Makarov	1	0	0	0	1	0
27	(Russia)	MF	Igor Denisov	3	0	1	0	4	0
34	(Russia)	MF	Vladimir Bystrov	2	0	0	0	2	0
38	(Russia)	DF	Igor Nedorezov	1	0	0	0	1	0
45	(Russia)	MF	Konstantin Konoplyov	1	0	0	0	1	0
46	(Russia)	DF	Konstantin Lobov	3	0	1	0	4	0
Players away on loan:
Players who left Zenit St.Petersburg during the season:
4	(Armenia)	DF	Sargis Hovsepyan	5	0	0	0	5	0
7	(Russia)	FW	Sergei Osipov	3	0	0	0	3	0
			TOTALS	76	5	5	0	81	5
