= 2002 FC Zenit Saint Petersburg season =

FC Zenit Saint Petersburg
2002 season
- Manager: Yury Morozov; Mikhail Biryukov; Boris Rappoport
- Stadium: Petrovsky Stadium
- Premier League: 10th
- 01/02 Cup: Runners Up
- 02/03 Cup: Round of 16 vs Lada-Tolyatti
- UEFA Cup: First round vs Grasshopper
- Top goalscorer: League: Aleksandr Kerzhakov (14); All: Aleksandr Kerzhakov (16)

The 2002 Zenit St.Petersburg season was the club's eighth season in the Russian Premier League, the highest tier of association football in Russia.

== Squad ==
As of match played 17 November 2002

No.	Name	Nationality	Position	Date of birth (age)	Signed from	Signed in	Contract ends	Apps.	Goals
Goalkeepers
16	Vyacheslav Malafeev	(Russia)	GK	4 March 1979 (aged 23)	Youth Team	1999		92	0
28	Sergei Losev	(Russia)	GK	31 July 1983 (aged 19)	Youth Team	2001			
31	Sergey Ivanov	(Russia)	GK	16 June 1984 (aged 18)	Youth Team	2001			
33	Aleksandr Makarov	(Russia)	GK	23 August 1978 (aged 24)	Lokomotiv St.Petersburg	2000			
Defenders
2	Daniel Chiriță	(Romania)	DF	24 March 1974 (aged 28)	Shakhtar Donetsk	2002		13	1
4	Sargis Hovsepyan	(Armenia)	DF	2 November 1972 (aged 30)	Pyunik	1998			
5	Aleksei Igonin	(Russia)	DF	18 March 1976 (aged 26)	Youth Team	1995			
7	Milan Vještica	(Federal Republic of Yugoslavia)	DF	15 November 1979 (aged 23)	Vojvodina	2002		11	3
14	Konstantin Lepyokhin	(Russia)	DF	2 October 1975 (aged 27)	Druzhba Maykop	1996			
20	Mikhail Yakovenko	(Russia)	DF	30 May 1980 (aged 22)					
22	Valeri Tsvetkov	(Russia)	DF	5 November 1977 (aged 25)	Pskov	2000			
32	Dmitri Vasilyev	(Russia)	DF	18 April 1983 (aged 19)	Youth Team	2001			
37	Dmitri Davydov	(Russia)	DF	22 January 1975 (aged 27)	Youth Team	1993			
38	Igor Nedorezov	(Russia)	DF	27 June 1981 (aged 21)	FC Pskov	2000			
46	Konstantin Lobov	(Russia)	DF	2 May 1981 (aged 21)	Youth Team	1998			
Midfielders
3	Zeno Bundea	(Romania)	MF	4 October 1977 (aged 25)	Waldhof Mannheim	2002		3	0
6	Oleksandr Spivak	(Ukraine)	MF	6 January 1975 (aged 27)	Metalurh Zaporizhya	2000			
10	Vladimir Mudrinić	(Federal Republic of Yugoslavia)	MF	26 July 1976 (aged 26)	Sartid Smederevo	2002		10	2
13	Denis Ugarov	(Russia)	MF	26 November 1975 (aged 26)	Irtysh Omsk	1999			
15	Andrey Arshavin	(Russia)	MF	29 May 1981 (aged 21)	Youth Team	1999		82	11
17	Sergei Vasyanovich	(Russia)	MF	8 July 1982 (aged 20)	Youth Team	2000			
18	Valentin Filatov	(Russia)	MF	19 March 1982 (aged 20)	Youth Team	2001			
24	Barys Haravoy	(Belarus)	MF	8 April 1974 (aged 28)	Torpedo-MAZ	1999			
27	Igor Denisov	(Russia)	MF	17 May 1984 (aged 18)	Youth Team	2002		1	0
29	Aleksei Lazarev	(Russia)	MF	21 April 1981 (aged 21)	Youth Team	1999			
34	Vladimir Bystrov	(Russia)	MF	31 January 1984 (aged 18)	Youth Team	2001			
35	Viktor Lopatyonok	(Russia)	MF	18 February 1984 (aged 18)	Youth Team	2002		0	0
43	Oleg Vlasov	(Russia)	MF	10 December 1984 (aged 17)	Metallurg Pikalyovo	2002		0	0
44	Maksim Mosin	(Russia)	MF	16 February 1982 (aged 20)	Youth Team	1999			
45	Konstantin Konoplyov	(Russia)	MF	13 May 1980 (aged 22)	Youth Team	1998			
47	Darius Miceika	(Lithuania)	MF	22 February 1983 (aged 19)	Žalgiris	2002		12	2
48	Stanislav Miloserdov	(Russia)	MF	24 January 1984 (aged 18)	Youth Team	2002		0	0
49	Yevgeny Levandovsky	(Russia)	MF	5 February 1983 (aged 19)	Youth Team	2002		0	0
50	Semyon Melnikov	(Russia)	MF	27 January 1985 (aged 17)	Youth Team	2002		0	0
55	Dzhambulad Bazayev	(Russia)	MF	18 August 1979 (aged 23)	Alania Vladikavkaz	2002		11	3
Forwards
8	Sergei Osipov	(Russia)	FW	10 July 1978 (aged 24)	Youth Team	1996			
9	Predrag Ranđelović	(Federal Republic of Yugoslavia)	FW	13 September 1976 (aged 26)	CSKA Moscow	2002		12	4
11	Aleksandr Kerzhakov	(Russia)	FW	27 November 1982 (aged 19)	Youth Team	2001		66	24
19	Maksim Astafyev	(Russia)	FW	8 December 1982 (aged 19)	Youth Team	2000			
23	Andrei Nikolayev	(Russia)	FW	30 August 1982 (aged 20)	Sheksna Cherepovets	2001			
25	Dzmitry Aharodnik	(Belarus)	FW	11 June 1978 (aged 24)	Dnepr-Transmash Mogilev	2000			
26	Dmitri Makarov	(Russia)	FW	16 September 1982 (aged 20)	Youth Team	2000			
Away on loan
Left during the season
30	Yevgeni Tarasov	(Kazakhstan)	FW	25 March 1979 (aged 23)	Kairat	2000			

== Transfers ==
=== In ===
Date	Position	Nationality	Name	From	Fee	Ref.
Winter 2002	DF	(Federal Republic of Yugoslavia)	Milan Vještica	Vojvodina	Undisclosed	
Winter 2002	MF	(Russia)	Oleg Vlasov	Metallurg Pikalyovo	Undisclosed	
Winter 2002	MF	(Federal Republic of Yugoslavia)	Vladimir Mudrinić	Smederevo 1924	Undisclosed	
Winter 2002	FW	(Federal Republic of Yugoslavia)	Predrag Ranđelović	CSKA Moscow	Undisclosed	
Summer 2002	DF	(Romania)	Daniel Chiriță	Shakhtar Donetsk	Undisclosed	
Summer 2002	MF	(Lithuania)	Darius Miceika	Žalgiris	Undisclosed	
Summer 2002	MF	(Romania)	Zeno Bundea	Waldhof Mannheim	Undisclosed	
Summer 2002	MF	(Russia)	Dzhambulad Bazayev	Alania Vladikavkaz	Undisclosed	

=== Out ===
Date	Position	Nationality	Name	To	Fee	Ref.
Summer 2002	FW	(Kazakhstan)	Yevgeni Tarasov	Sokol Saratov	Undisclosed	

== Competitions ==
=== Overall record ===
Competition	First match	Last match	Starting round	Final position	Record							
Competition	First match	Last match	Starting round	Final position	Pld	W	D	L	GF	GA	GD	Win %
Premier League	9 March 2002	17 November 2002	Matchday 1	10th	30	8	9	13	36	42	−6	26.67
2001–02 Russian Cup	3 April 2002	12 May 2002	Quarterfinal	Runners Up	3	2	0	1	2	2	+0	66.67
2002–03 Russian Cup	14 September 2002	19 October 2002	Round of 32	Round of 16	2	1	0	1	4	4	+0	50.00
UEFA Cup	15 August 2002		Qualifying Round	First Round	4	3	0	1	16	4	+12	75.00
Total					39	14	9	16	58	52	+6	35.90

Last updated: 17 November 2002
Source: #Competitions

=== Premier League ===
==== Results by round ====
Round	1	2	3	4	5	6	7	8	9	10	11	12	13	14	15	16	17	18	19	20	21	22	23	24	25	26	27	28	29	30
Ground	A	H	A	H	A	H	A	H	A	H	A	A	H	A	H	A	H	A	H	H	A	H	A	H	A	H	A	H	A	H
Result	L	W	L	D	W	D	L	D	W	W	W	D	W	L	L	L	L	W	W	L	D	D	D	D	L	L	D	L	L	L

Updated to match(es) played on 17 November 2002. Source: See Results
A = Away; H = Home; W = Win; D = Draw; L = Loss

==== Results ====
9 March 2002 1	Anzhi Makhachkala	2 – 0	Zenit St.Petersburg	Makhachkala
MSK (UTC+3)	Hošić (yellow card) 22'; Stojković (yellow card) 28'; Budunov 51'; Prudius 85'	Report		Stadium: Dynamo Stadium; Attendance: 15,000; Referee: Valentin Ivanov

13 March 2002 2	Zenit St.Petersburg	1 – 0	Rotor Volgograd	Saint Petersburg
17:00 MSK (UTC+3)	Arshavin 56' (yellow card) 89'	Report		Stadium: Petrovsky Stadium; Attendance: 20,000; Referee: Alexey Tyumin

17 March 2002 3	CSKA Moscow	1 – 0	Zenit St.Petersburg	Moscow
15:00 MSK (UTC+3)	Laizāns (yellow card) 42'; Kirichenko (yellow card) 57'; Gusev 89'	Report	Mudrinić (yellow card) 38'; Hovsepyan (yellow card) 65'; Vještica (yellow card) 70'	Stadium: Eduard Streltsov Stadium; Attendance: 13,200; Referee: Stanislav Sukhina

23 March 2002 4	Zenit St.Petersburg	2 – 2	Torpedo Moscow	Saint Petersburg
16:00 MSK (UTC+3)	Hovsepyan (yellow card) 8'; Astafyev 17'; Kerzhakov 64'; Haravoy (yellow card) 70'	Report	Sarkisyan (yellow card) 10'; Makhmutov (yellow card) 23'; Lebedenko 69', 75'	Stadium: Petrovsky Stadium; Attendance: 20,000; Referee: Yury Chebotaryov

30 March 2002 5	Rostselmash	1 – 2	Zenit St.Petersburg	Rostov-on-Don
16:00 MSK (UTC+3)	Rogochiy (yellow card) 31'; Karpovich (yellow card) 38'; Hovsepyan 85' (o.g.); Adamu (yellow card) 90'	Report	Kerzhakov 18'; Lepyokhin (yellow card) 65'; Igonin (yellow card) 82'; Katulsky 89'	Stadium: Olimp-2; Attendance: 12,000; Referee: Mikhail Khodyrev

7 April 2002 6	Zenit St.Petersburg	1 – 1	Shinnik Yaroslavl	Saint Petersburg
16:00 MSK (UTC+4)	Astafyev 4'	Report	Bychkov 65'; Skokov (yellow card) 75'; Kulchy (yellow card) 90'	Stadium: Petrovsky Stadium; Attendance: 21,500; Referee: Aleksandr Gvardis

13 April 2002 7	Krylia Sovetov	1 – 0	Zenit St.Petersburg	Samara
17:00 MSK (UTC+4)	Gaúcho 12'; Barasa (yellow card) 70'; Poškus (yellow card) 89'; Karyaka (yellow card) 90'	Report	Haravoy (yellow card) 43'; Arshavin (yellow card) 70'; Igonin (yellow card) 86'	Stadium: Metallurg Stadium; Attendance: 17,000; Referee: Yuri Baskakov

20 April 2002 8	Zenit St.Petersburg	1 – 1	Lokomotiv Moscow	Saint Petersburg
16:00 MSK (UTC+4)	Igonin (yellow card) 37'; Arshavin 46'; Astafyev (yellow card) 58'	Report	Loskov (yellow card) 33'; Izmailov 36'; Nizhegorodov (yellow card) 43' (yellow-red card) 67'; Drozdov (yellow card) 65'	Stadium: Petrovsky Stadium; Attendance: 20,000; Referee: Stanislav Sukhina

28 April 2002 9	Dynamo Moscow	0 – 2	Zenit St.Petersburg	Moscow
19:00 MSK (UTC+4)	Kharlachyov (yellow card) 1'	Report	Arshavin 42'; Kerzhakov 44' (yellow card) 44'	Stadium: Central Stadium; Attendance: 5,500; Referee: Yury Chebotaryov

4 May 2002 10	Zenit St.Petersburg	2 – 0	Sokol Saratov	Saint Petersburg
16:00 MSK (UTC+4)	Tsvetkov 29'; Kerzhakov 70'; Filatov (yellow card) 84'	Report	Baltiev (yellow card) 39'	Stadium: Petrovsky Stadium; Attendance: 21,500; Referee: Sergei Martynov

8 May 2002 11	Moscow	1 – 2	Zenit St.Petersburg	Moscow
16:00 MSK (UTC+4)	Shustikov (yellow card) 22' (yellow-red card) 83'; Smirnov 60'	Report	Kerzhakov 27', 72'; Konoplyov (yellow card) 39'	Stadium: Eduard Streltsov Stadium; Attendance: 5,000; Referee: Aleksandr Gvardis

13 May 2002 12	Uralan Elista	3 – 3	Zenit St.Petersburg	Elista
19:00 MSK (UTC+4)	Semochko (yellow card) 28'; Tsiklauri 29'; Kolodin 43'; Ospeshinskiy (yellow card) 55'; Avakov (yellow card) 76' (goal) 80'; Dzamikhov (yellow card) 84'	Report	Kerzhakov 19', 45', 88'; Arshavin (yellow card) 26'; Igonin (yellow card) 43'; Ranđelović (yellow card) 53'	Stadium: Uralan Stadium; Attendance: 5,500; Referee: Yuri Baskakov

2 July 2002 13	Zenit St.Petersburg	2 – 1	Alania Vladikavkaz	Saint Petersburg
17:00 MSK (UTC+4)	Mudrinić (yellow card) 24'; Tarasov 33'; Kerzhakov 71'	Report	Bestayev (yellow card) 18'; Tarlowski (yellow card) 28' (yellow-red card) 42'; Ashvetia 47'; Paulo Emilio (yellow card) 84'	Stadium: Petrovsky Stadium; Attendance: 18,500; Referee: Alexander Evstigneev

10 July 2002 14	Spartak Moscow	4 – 3	Zenit St.Petersburg	Moscow
17:00 MSK (UTC+4)	Beschastnykh 51' (pen.), 58'; Ananko (yellow card) 63'; Kébé 64'; Sychev 69' (yellow card) 69'	Report	Kerzhakov 5', 60'; Arshavin 47'; Tarasov (yellow card) 78'	Stadium: Luzhniki Stadium; Attendance: 9,000; Referee: Igor Egorov

16 July 2002 15	Zenit St.Petersburg	1 – 2	Saturn-REN TV	Saint Petersburg
19:00 MSK (UTC+4)	Kerzhakov 51'; Igonin (yellow card) 72'	Report	Melyoshin 27'; Lyapkin (yellow card) 59'; Joldić 66'; Tseryuta (yellow card) 68'	Stadium: Petrovsky Stadium; Attendance: 20,500; Referee: Mikhail Khodyrev

24 July 2002 16	Alania Vladikavkaz	1 – 0	Zenit St.Petersburg	Vladikavkaz
19:00 MSK (UTC+4)	Sviderskyi (yellow card) 17'; Ashvetia 42'; Bestayev (yellow card) 88'	Report	Malafeev (yellow card) 22'	Stadium: Republican Spartak Stadium; Attendance: 25,000; Referee: Sergei Martynov

30 July 2002 17	Zenit St.Petersburg	0 – 1	Spartak Moscow	Saint Petersburg
17:00 MSK (UTC+4)	Nedorezov (yellow card) 66'; Mudrinić (yellow card) 68'	Report	Titov (yellow card) 12'; Mitreski (yellow card) 29'; Moura (yellow card) 44'; Kudryashov (yellow card) 70'; Beschastnykh 78'; Ananko (yellow card) 78'; Essien (yellow card) 89'	Stadium: Petrovsky Stadium; Attendance: 21,500; Referee: Stanislav Sukhina

3 August 2002 18	Saturn-REN TV	1 – 2	Zenit St.Petersburg	Ramenskoye
18:00 MSK (UTC+4)	Sosnovschi (yellow card) 52'; Rogaciov 69'; Mikadze (yellow card) 71'; Melyoshin (yellow card) 73'	Report	Mudrinić 56'; Igonin (yellow card) 61'; Kerzhakov 90+' (yellow card) 90+'	Stadium: Saturn Stadium; Attendance: 12,000; Referee: Yuri Baskakov

10 August 2002 19	Zenit St.Petersburg	2 – 1	Uralan Elista	Saint Petersburg
16:00 MSK (UTC+4)	Spivak 72'; Makarov 73'	Report	Filimonov (yellow card) 10'; Kazakov (yellow card) 36'; Bokov (yellow card) 60' (yellow-red card) 90'; Semochko 80'	Stadium: Petrovsky Stadium; Attendance: 17,500; Referee: Aleksandr Gvardis

19 August 2002 20	Zenit St.Petersburg	1 – 2	Dynamo Moscow	Saint Petersburg
17:00 MSK (UTC+4)	Konoplyov (yellow card) 13'; Chiriță (yellow card) 37'; Haravoy (yellow card) 69'; Bazayev 75'; Miceika (yellow card) 81'; Osipov (penalty missed) 85'	Report	Koroman (yellow card) 8' (goal) 33'; Dyatel (yellow card) 50' (goal) 72'; Panov (yellow card) 60' (yellow-red card) 77'; Covalenco (yellow card) 90'	Stadium: Petrovsky Stadium; Attendance: 16,000; Referee: Igor Egorov

24 August 2002 21	Sokol Saratov	2 – 2	Zenit St.Petersburg	Saratov
16:00 MSK (UTC+4)	Fedkov 4'; Valadzyankow 29' (yellow card) 45'; Musin (yellow card) 43' (yellow-red card) 90'; Duyun (yellow card) 52'	Report	Spivak 44' (pen.); Hovsepyan (yellow card) 61'; Miceika (yellow card) 73' (goal) 79'	Stadium: Lokomotiv Stadium; Attendance: 9,500; Referee: Valentin Ivanov

1 September 2002 22	Zenit St.Petersburg	0 – 0	Moscow	Saint Petersburg
19:00 MSK (UTC+4)	Ranđelović (yellow card) 43'; Bundea (yellow card) 47'; Kerzhakov (penalty missed) 88'	Report	Smirnov (yellow card) 22'; Shustikov (yellow card) 30'; Novosadov (yellow card) 56'; Kornaukhov (yellow card) 89'	Stadium: Petrovsky Stadium; Attendance: 18,000; Referee: Yury Chebotaryov

10 September 2002 23	Torpedo Moscow	1 – 1	Zenit St.Petersburg	Moscow
19:00 MSK (UTC+4)	Semshov (red card) 81'; Lukhvich (yellow card) 82'; Leonchenko 89' (pen.)	Report	Spivak 31'; Arshavin (yellow card) 34'; Chiriță (yellow card) 84'	Stadium: Luzhniki Stadium; Attendance: 3,000; Referee: Igor Egorov

23 September 2002 24	Zenit St.Petersburg	2 – 2	Anzhi Makhachkala	Saint Petersburg
19:00 MSK (UTC+4)	Arshavin (yellow card) 23'; Spivak 34' (pen.); Ranđelović 76'	Report	Agalarov (yellow card) 5'; Willer (yellow card) 13' (goal) 29' (pen.); Stojković (yellow card) 19'; Mitrofanov 25'; Armishev (yellow card) 42'; Pelcis (yellow card) 71'; Velička (yellow card) 88'	Stadium: Petrovsky Stadium; Attendance: 13,000; Referee: Mikhail Veselovsky

28 September 2002 25	Rotor Volgograd	2 – 1	Zenit St.Petersburg	Volgograd
17:00 MSK (UTC+4)	Yesipov 5', 17' (pen.); Zubko (yellow card) 70'; Gaidukov (yellow card) 78'; Zernov (yellow card) 87'	Report	Bazayev 53'	Stadium: Central Stadium; Attendance: 10,000; Referee: Valery Shaveyko

6 October 2002 26	Zenit St.Petersburg	0 – 2	CSKA Moscow	Saint Petersburg
16:00 MSK (UTC+4)	Arshavin (yellow card) 57' (yellow-red card) 65'	Report	Yevsikov (yellow card) 38'; Semak (yellow card) 45' (yellow-red card) 55'; Shershun (yellow card) 53' (goal) 66'; Solomatin (yellow card) 58'; Yanovsky 75'	Stadium: Petrovsky Stadium; Attendance: 15,000; Referee: Igor Egorov

26 October 2002 27	Shinnik Yaroslavl	1 – 1	Zenit St.Petersburg	Yaroslavl
16:00 MSK (UTC+4)	Kulchy (yellow card) 46'; Grishin (yellow card) 51'; Shevchuk 55'	Report	Spivak (yellow card) 13'; Osipov (yellow card) 27'; Haravoy (yellow card) 30'; Hovsepyan (yellow card) 55'; Konoplyov 75'; Filatov (yellow card) 86'	Stadium: Shinnik Stadium; Attendance: 9,000; Referee: Yuri Baskakov

2 November 2002 28	Zenit St.Petersburg	0 – 2	Rostselmash	Saint Petersburg
16:00 MSK (UTC+3)	Hovsepyan (yellow card) 26'; Arshavin (yellow card) 87'	Report	Karpovich 12'; Kupriyanov (yellow card) 24'; Akopyants 30'; Kampamba (yellow card) 53'; Maslov (penalty missed) 65'; Kruščić (yellow card) 89'	Stadium: Petrovsky Stadium; Attendance: 9,000; Referee: Alexander Evstigneev

10 November 2002 29	Lokomotiv Moscow	2 – 1	Zenit St.Petersburg	Moscow
17:00 MSK (UTC+3)	Evseev 30', 41' (yellow card) 72'; Drozdov (yellow card) 69'	Report	Chiriță (yellow card) 18'; Lepyokhin (yellow card) 66'; Spivak 80' (pen.); Hovsepyan (yellow card) 90+'; Bazayev (yellow card) 90+'	Stadium: RZD Arena; Attendance: 3,000; Referee: Stanislav Sukhina

17 November 2002 30	Zenit St.Petersburg	1 – 2	Krylia Sovetov	Saint Petersburg
16:00 MSK (UTC+3)	Chiriță 32'; Filatov (yellow card) 70'; Malafeev (yellow card) 87'	Report	Poškus 39'; Bushmanov (yellow card) 45'; Bobyor (yellow card) 61'; Vinogradov 78'; Tikhonov (yellow card) 85'	Stadium: Petrovsky Stadium; Attendance: 10,000; Referee: Mikhail Khodyrev

==== League table ====
Pos	Team	Pld	W	D	L	GF	GA	GD	Pts
8	Dynamo Moscow	30	12	6	12	38	33	+5	42
9	Rotor Volgograd	30	11	5	14	27	34	−7	38
10	Zenit St. Petersburg	30	8	9	13	36	42	−6	33
11	Rostselmash	30	7	10	13	29	49	−20	31
12	Alania Vladikavkaz	30	8	6	16	31	42	−11	30

Source: RFPL
Rules for classification: 1) points; 2) goal difference; 3) number of goals scored.

=== Russian Cup ===
==== 2001/02 ====
3 April 2002 Quarterfinal	Zenit St.Petersburg	1 – 0	Krylia Sovetov	Saint Petersburg
MSK (UTC+3)	Astafyev (yellow card) 62'; Konoplyov (yellow card) 82'; Kerzhakov 90'; Hovsepyan (yellow card) 90'	Report		Stadium: Petrovsky Stadium

24 April 2002 Semifinal	Saturn	0 – 1 (a.e.t.)	Zenit St.Petersburg	Ramenskoye
MSK (UTC+3)		Report	Igonin (yellow card) 12'; Arshavin 100'	Stadium: Saturn Stadium

12 May 2002 Final	CSKA Moscow	2 – 0	Zenit St.Petersburg	Moscow
16:00 MSK (UTC+3)	Solomatin 30' (yellow card) 71'; Yanovsky 52'; Laizāns (yellow card) 76'; Gusev (yellow card) 88'	Report	Astafyev (yellow card) 28'; Katulsky (yellow card) 51'; Tarasov (yellow card) 85'	Stadium: Luzhniki Stadium; Referee: Yu.Chebotarev

==== 2002/03 ====
14 September 2002 Round of 32	Uralmash	1 – 2	Zenit St.Petersburg	Yekaterinburg
MSK (UTC+4)	K.Markov 30'	Report	Osipov 29'; Lepyokhin 85'	Stadium: Central Stadium; Attendance: 14,500; Referee: Aleksei Nikolaev

19 October 2002 Round of 16	Lada-Tolyatti	3 – 2 (a.e.t.)	Zenit St.Petersburg	Tolyatti
MSK (UTC+4)	Belozyorov 11', 62'; Strelkov 92'	Report	Miceika (yellow card) 14'; Bazayev 17'; Spivak 37'; Hovsepyan (yellow card) 87'	Stadium: Torpedo Stadium; Attendance: 8,000; Referee: Alexander Kolobaev

=== UEFA Cup ===
15 August 2002 Qualifying round 1st leg	Encamp (Andorra)	0 – 5	(Russia) Zenit St.Petersburg	Andorra la Vella, Andorra
19:00 MSK (UTC+4)		Report	Arshavin 3', 52'; Spivak 60' (pen.); Makarov 65'; Osipov 75'	Stadium: Estadi Comunal; Referee: Ceri Richards (Wales)

29 August 2002 Qualifying round 2nd leg	Zenit St.Petersburg (Russia)	8 – 0 (13 – 0 agg.)	(Andorra) Encamp	Saint Petersburg, Russia
19:00 MSK (UTC+4)	Osipov 14', 69'; Ranđelović 21', 71', 73'; Spivak 57'; Miceika 86'; Nikolayev 89'	Report	P.Mario (yellow card) 45'; Leonardo (yellow card) 67'; Giráldez (yellow card) 86'	Stadium: Petrovsky Stadium; Referee: Costas Theodotou (Cyprus)

19 September 2002 First round 1st leg	Grasshopper (Switzerland)	3 – 1	(Russia) Zenit St.Petersburg	Zürich, Switzerland
21:30 MSK (UTC+4)	Baturina 6'; Barijho 44'; Eduardo (yellow card) 50'; Núñez 53'	Report	Filatov 33'; Bazayev (yellow card) 36'; Spivak (yellow card) 50'; Tsvetkov (yellow card) 51'	Stadium: Hardturm; Referee: Emil Bozinovski (Macedonia)

3 October 2002 First round 2nd leg	Zenit St.Petersburg (Russia)	2 – 1 (3 – 4 agg.)	(Switzerland) Grasshopper	Saint Petersburg, Russia
19:00 MSK (UTC+4)	Kerzhakov 7', 19'; Miceika (yellow card) 37'; Bazayev (yellow card) 45'; Filatov (yellow card) 57'	Report	Tararache (yellow card) 42'; Smiljanić (yellow card) 84'; Baturina 89'	Stadium: Petrovsky Stadium; Referee: Orhan Erdemir (Turkey)

== Squad statistics ==
As of match played 17 November 2002

=== Appearances and goals ===
No.	Pos	Nat	Player	Total		Premier League		01/02 Russian Cup		02/03 Russian Cup		UEFA Cup	
No.	Pos	Nat	Player	Apps	Goals	Apps	Goals	Apps	Goals	Apps	Goals	Apps	Goals
2	DF	(Romania) ROU	Daniel Chiriță	13	1	9	1	0	0	2	0	2	0
3	MF	(Romania) ROU	Zeno Bundea	3	0	0+2	0	0	0	1	0	0	0
4	DF	(Armenia) ARM	Sargis Hovsepyan	36	0	27	0	3	0	2	0	4	0
5	DF	(Russia) RUS	Aleksei Igonin	21	0	18	0	3	0	0	0	0	0
6	MF	(Ukraine) UKR	Oleksandr Spivak	22	8	14+1	5	0+1	0	2	1	4	2
7	DF	(Federal Republic of Yugoslavia) YUG	Milan Vještica	11	3	6+1	0	1	0	0	0	2+1	3
8	FW	(Russia) RUS	Sergei Osipov	10	1	1+6	0	0	0	2	1	1	0
9	FW	(Federal Republic of Yugoslavia) YUG	Predrag Ranđelović	12	4	7+2	1	0+1	0	0	0	1+1	3
10	MF	(Federal Republic of Yugoslavia) YUG	Vladimir Mudrinić	11	1	8+1	1	0+1	0	0	0	0+1	0
11	FW	(Russia) RUS	Aleksandr Kerzhakov	36	17	29	14	3	1	2	0	2	2
13	MF	(Russia) RUS	Denis Ugarov	18	0	10+3	0	1+1	0	0+1	0	1+1	0
14	DF	(Russia) RUS	Konstantin Lepyokhin	33	1	26	0	3	0	2	1	2	0
15	MF	(Russia) RUS	Andrey Arshavin	37	7	28+2	4	3	1	0	0	4	2
16	GK	(Russia) RUS	Vyacheslav Malafeev	37	0	29	0	3	0	2	0	3	0
18	MF	(Russia) RUS	Valentin Filatov	28	1	18+3	0	1	0	1+1	0	4	1
19	FW	(Russia) RUS	Maksim Astafyev	16	2	8+4	2	3	0	0+1	0	0	0
20	DF	(Russia) RUS	Aleksei Katulsky	18	1	14+2	1	2	0	0	0	0	0
22	DF	(Russia) RUS	Valeri Tsvetkov	34	1	27	1	3	0	1	0	3	0
23	FW	(Russia) RUS	Andrei Nikolayev	4	1	0+3	0	0	0	0	0	0+1	1
24	MF	(Belarus) BLR	Barys Haravoy	32	0	19+4	0	2+1	0	2	0	4	0
25	FW	(Belarus) BLR	Dzmitry Aharodnik	3	0	0+2	0	0	0	0	0	0+1	0
26	FW	(Russia) RUS	Dmitri Makarov	8	2	2+4	1	0	0	0	0	2	1
27	MF	(Russia) RUS	Igor Denisov	1	0	0+1	0	0	0	0	0	0	0
31	GK	(Russia) RUS	Sergey Ivanov	2	0	1	0	0	0	0	0	1	0
34	MF	(Russia) RUS	Vladimir Bystrov	12	0	1+7	0	1	0	0+1	0	0+2	0
37	DF	(Russia) RUS	Dmitri Davydov	2	0	2	0	0	0	0	0	0	0
38	DF	(Russia) RUS	Igor Nedorezov	1	0	0+1	0	0	0	0	0	0	0
45	MF	(Russia) RUS	Konstantin Konoplyov	19	1	12+3	1	1+1	0	0+1	0	1	0
47	MF	(Lithuania) LTU	Darius Miceika	12	2	3+5	1	0	0	1	0	1+2	1
55	MF	(Russia) RUS	Dzhambulad Bazayev	11	3	6+1	2	0	0	2	1	2	0
Players who left Zenit during the season:
30	FW	(Kazakhstan) KAZ	Yevgeni Tarasov	6	1	2+3	1	0+1	0	0	0	0	0

=== Goal scorers ===
Place	Position	Nation	Number	Name	Premier League	01/02 Russian Cup	02/03 Russian Cup	UEFA Cup	Total
1	FW	(Russia)	11	Aleksandr Kerzhakov	14	1	0	2	17
2	MF	(Ukraine)	6	Oleksandr Spivak	5	0	1	2	8
3	MF	(Russia)	15	Andrey Arshavin	4	1	0	2	7
4	FW	(Federal Republic of Yugoslavia)	9	Predrag Ranđelović	1	0	0	3	4
4	FW	(Russia)	8	Sergei Osipov	0	0	1	3	4
6	MF	(Russia)	55	Dzhambulad Bazayev	2	0	1	0	3
7	FW	(Russia)	19	Maksim Astafyev	2	0	0	0	2
8	DF	(Russia)	20	Aleksei Katulsky	1	0	0	0	1
8	DF	(Russia)	22	Valeri Tsvetkov	1	0	0	0	1
8	FW	(Kazakhstan)	30	Yevgeni Tarasov	1	0	0	0	1
8	MF	(Federal Republic of Yugoslavia)	10	Vladimir Mudrinić	1	0	0	0	1
8	FW	(Russia)	26	Dmitri Makarov	1	0	0	1	1
8	MF	(Lithuania)	47	Darius Miceika	1	0	0	1	1
8	MF	(Russia)	45	Konstantin Konoplyov	1	0	0	0	1
8	DF	(Romania)	2	Daniel Chiriță	1	0	0	0	1
8	DF	(Russia)	14	Konstantin Lepyokhin	0	0	1	0	1
8	FW	(Russia)	23	Andrei Nikolayev	0	0	0	1	1
8	MF	(Russia)	18	Valentin Filatov	0	0	0	1	1
				TOTALS	36	2	4	16	58

=== Clean sheets ===
Place	Position	Nation	Number	Name	Premier League	01/02 Russian Cup	02/03 Russian Cup	UEFA Cup	Total
1	GK	(Russia)	16	Vyacheslav Malafeev	4	2	0	1	7
2	GK	(Russia)	31	Sergey Ivanov	0	0	0	1	1
				TOTALS	4	2	0	2	8

=== Disciplinary record ===
Number	Nation	Position	Name	Premier League		01/02 Russian Cup		02/03 Russian Cup		UEFA League		Total	
Number	Nation	Position	Name	Yellow card	Red card	Yellow card	Red card	Yellow card	Red card	Yellow card	Red card	Yellow card	Red card
2	(Romania)	DF	Daniel Chiriță	3	0	0	0	0	0	0	0	3	0
3	(Romania)	MF	Zeno Bundea	1	0	0	0	0	0	0	0	1	0
4	(Armenia)	DF	Sargis Hovsepyan	6	0	1	0	1	0	0	0	8	0
5	(Russia)	DF	Aleksei Igonin	6	0	1	0	0	0	0	0	7	0
6	(Ukraine)	MF	Oleksandr Spivak	1	0	0	0	0	0	1	0	2	0
7	(Federal Republic of Yugoslavia)	DF	Milan Vještica	1	0	0	0	0	0	0	0	1	0
8	(Russia)	FW	Sergei Osipov	1	0	0	0	0	0	0	0	1	0
9	(Federal Republic of Yugoslavia)	FW	Predrag Ranđelović	2	0	0	0	0	0	0	0	2	0
10	(Federal Republic of Yugoslavia)	MF	Vladimir Mudrinić	3	0	0	0	0	0	0	0	3	0
11	(Russia)	FW	Aleksandr Kerzhakov	2	0	0	0	0	0	0	0	2	0
14	(Russia)	DF	Konstantin Lepyokhin	1	0	0	0	0	0	0	0	1	0
15	(Russia)	MF	Andrey Arshavin	8	1	0	0	0	0	0	0	8	1
16	(Russia)	GK	Vyacheslav Malafeev	2	0	0	0	0	0	0	0	2	0
18	(Russia)	MF	Valentin Filatov	3	0	0	0	0	0	1	0	4	0
19	(Russia)	FW	Maksim Astafyev	1	0	2	0	0	0	0	0	3	0
20	(Russia)	DF	Aleksei Katulsky	0	0	1	0	0	0	0	0	1	0
22	(Russia)	DF	Valeri Tsvetkov	0	0	0	0	0	0	1	0	1	0
24	(Belarus)	MF	Barys Haravoy	4	0	0	0	0	0	0	0	4	0
38	(Russia)	DF	Igor Nedorezov	1	0	0	0	0	0	0	0	1	0
45	(Russia)	MF	Konstantin Konoplyov	3	0	1	0	0	0	0	0	4	0
47	(Lithuania)	MF	Darius Miceika	2	0	0	0	1	0	1	0	4	0
55	(Russia)	MF	Dzhambulad Bazayev	1	0	0	0	0	0	2	0	3	0
Players away on loan:
Players who left Zenit St.Petersburg during the season:
30	(Kazakhstan)	FW	Yevgeni Tarasov	1	0	1	0	0	0	0	0	2	0
			TOTALS	53	1	7	0	2	0	6	0	68	1
