= 2001 Russian Top Division =

10th season of top-tier football league in Russia

Russian Top Division
- Season: 2001
- Champions: Spartak Moscow; 9th Russian title
- Relegated: Fakel Voronezh; Chernomorets Novorossiysk
- Matches played: 240
- Goals scored: 607 (2.53 per match)
- Top goalscorer: Dmitri Vyazmikin (18 goals)

Spartak Moscow won their sixth consecutive Russian title, and ninth overall.

However, the season was overshadowed by the death of CSKA and Ukraine goalkeeper Serhiy Perkhun, when he clashed heads with Anzhi striker Budun Budunov during the round 22 match against them on 18 August. Both players were injured, and Perkhun died from a brain haemorrhage caused by the collision on 28 August in the age of 23, 10 days after the match against Anzhi.

== Overview ==
Team	Head coach
FC Spartak Moscow	Oleg Romantsev
FC Lokomotiv Moscow	Yuri Syomin
FC Zenit St. Petersburg	Yuri Morozov
FC Torpedo Moscow	Vitaly Shevchenko
FC Krylia Sovetov Samara	Aleksandr Tarkhanov
FC Saturn Ramenskoye	Vladimir Shevchuk
PFC CSKA Moscow	Pavel Sadyrin (until October); Aleksandr Kuznetsov (caretaker) (from October)
FC Sokol Saratov	Aleksandr Koreshkov
FC Dynamo Moscow	Valery Gazzaev (until April); Aleksandr Novikov (from April)
FC Rotor Volgograd	Pavel Gusev
FC Rostselmash Rostov-on-Don	Sergei Balakhnin (until April); Anatoly Baidachny (from April)
FC Alania Vladikavkaz	Aleksandr Averyanov (until April); Aleksandr Yanovskiy (from April)
FC Anzhi Makhachkala	Gadzhi Gadzhiyev (until July); Aleksandr Markarov (caretaker) (July to November); Leonid Tkachenko (from November)
FC Torpedo-ZIL Moscow	Yevhen Kucherevskyi (Ukraine)
FC Fakel Voronezh	Valeri Nenenko (until May); Aleksandr Averyanov (from May)
FC Chernomorets Novorossiysk	Anatoly Baidachny (until April); Viktor Zernov (April to June); Sergey Andreyev (June to September); Khazret Dyshekov (caretaker) (from September)

== Standings ==
Pos	Team	Pld	W	D	L	GF	GA	GD	Pts	Qualification or relegation
1	Spartak Moscow (C)	30	17	9	4	56	30	+26	60	Qualification to Champions League group stage
2	Lokomotiv Moscow	30	16	8	6	53	24	+29	56	Qualification to Champions League third qualifying round
3	Zenit St. Petersburg	30	16	8	6	52	35	+17	56	Qualification to UEFA Cup qualifying round
4	Torpedo Moscow	30	15	7	8	53	42	+11	52	
5	Krylia Sovetov Samara	30	14	7	9	38	23	+15	49	Qualification to Intertoto Cup second round
6	Saturn	30	13	8	9	45	22	+23	47	
7	CSKA Moscow	30	12	11	7	39	30	+9	47	Qualification to UEFA Cup first round
8	Sokol Saratov	30	12	5	13	31	42	−11	41	
9	Dynamo Moscow	30	10	8	12	43	51	−8	38	
10	Rotor Volgograd	30	8	8	14	38	42	−4	32	
11	Rostselmash	30	8	8	14	29	43	−14	32	
12	Alania Vladikavkaz	30	8	8	14	31	47	−16	32	
13	Anzhi Makhachkala	30	7	11	12	28	34	−6	32	
14	Torpedo-ZIL Moscow	30	7	10	13	22	35	−13	31	
15	Fakel Voronezh (R)	30	8	4	18	30	53	−23	28	Relegation to First Division
16	Chernomorets Novorossiysk (R)	30	5	8	17	19	54	−35	23	Relegation to First Division

Source: rsssf.com
Rules for classification: 1) points; 2) goal difference; 3) number of goals scored.
(C) Champions; (R) Relegated

== Results ==
Home \ Away	ALA	ANZ	CHE	CSK	DYN	FAK	KRY	LOK	ROS	ROT	SAT	SOK	SPA	TOR	TZM	ZEN
Alania Vladikavkaz		2–1	1–0	0–0	3–3	0–1	0–1	1–1	3–0	3–1	0–5	2–0	3–3	2–0	1–1	2–0
Anzhi Makhachkala	3–2		3–1	0–0	1–0	2–2	4–1	1–0	0–1	0–0	1–1	2–0	1–2	0–1	0–2	0–0
Chernomorets Novorossiysk	1–0	0–0		2–0	1–1	1–0	0–0	2–1	1–1	2–3	0–3	1–3	1–2	0–5	0–0	1–4
CSKA Moscow	3–0	1–0	2–1		2–0	5–1	0–3	2–1	0–0	2–1	0–0	4–0	1–1	0–1	1–1	1–1
Dynamo Moscow	2–0	1–1	2–1	3–1		6–2	0–1	1–2	3–1	2–1	2–0	1–1	1–1	0–4	2–1	1–3
Fakel Voronezh	1–0	0–1	0–1	1–1	1–2		1–0	2–0	4–1	3–1	1–0	0–1	0–5	2–2	2–0	1–2
Krylia Sovetov Samara	1–1	0–0	0–0	0–0	3–0	3–1		1–1	3–0	3–0	2–0	1–0	1–2	3–0	2–1	1–0
Lokomotiv Moscow	3–1	4–0	4–0	3–2	4–1	1–0	1–2		0–0	2–0	1–1	3–0	2–1	3–1	1–0	5–1
Rostselmash	3–0	3–2	0–0	0–1	1–1	1–0	2–0	0–0		1–2	1–4	1–2	0–1	5–2	1–0	1–2
Rotor Volgograd	3–0	1–1	3–0	1–1	1–2	4–0	3–1	1–3	1–0		1–0	1–2	3–3	1–1	0–0	0–0
Saturn	1–0	1–0	4–0	1–1	6–1	0–0	2–0	0–0	0–1	2–1		1–2	3–0	0–1	1–0	2–2
Sokol Saratov	4–1	2–0	0–0	0–2	2–1	2–1	1–0	1–2	1–1	1–0	0–2		2–4	0–2	1–0	0–1
Spartak Moscow	1–1	2–1	5–0	1–0	2–1	3–0	1–0	1–0	5–1	1–0	0–0	0–0		2–2	1–1	3–1
Torpedo Moscow	0–1	2–1	3–1	1–3	1–1	3–1	0–4	1–1	2–1	1–1	1–4	6–2	2–0		1–0	3–2
Torpedo-ZIL Moscow	1–1	1–1	2–0	0–2	1–1	3–1	1–0	0–4	0–0	3–2	1–0	1–0	0–2	1–1		0–2
Zenit St. Petersburg	3–0	1–1	2–1	6–1	2–1	2–1	1–1	0–0	3–1	2–1	2–1	1–1	2–1	0–3	4–0	

Legend: Blue = home team win; Yellow = draw; Red = away team win.

== Season statistics ==
=== Top goalscorers ===
As of matches played on 8 November 2001.

Rank	Player	Club	Goals
1	(Russia) Dmitri Vyazmikin	Torpedo Moscow	18
2	(Russia) Andrei Fedkov	Sokol Saratov	14
2	(Nigeria) James Obiorah	Lokomotiv Moscow	14
2	(Moldova) Serghei Rogaciov	Saturn Ramenskoye	14
5	(Russia) Dmitri Kirichenko	Rostselmash	13
6	(Russia) Dmitri Loskov	Lokomotiv Moscow	12
6	(Russia) Vitali Safronov	Fakel Voronezh	12
8	(Brazil) Luis Robson	Spartak Moscow	11
8	(Russia) Yegor Titov	Spartak Moscow	11
8	(Russia) Valery Yesipov	Rotor Volgograd	11

== Awards ==
On 20 November, Russian Football Union named its list of 33 top players:

Goalkeepers

1. (Russia) Ruslan Nigmatullin (Lokomotiv Moscow)
2. (Ukraine) Serhiy Perkhun (CSKA Moscow)
3. (Ukraine) Maxym Levitsky (Spartak Moscow)

Right backs

1. (Russia) Gennadiy Nizhegorodov (Lokomotiv Moscow)
2. (Russia) Dmitri Sennikov (Lokomotiv Moscow)
3. (Russia) Vladimir Kurayev (Saturn)

Centre backs

1. (Russia) Igor Chugainov (Lokomotiv Moscow)
2. (North Macedonia) Igor Mitreski (Spartak Moscow)
3. (Russia) Yevgeni Bushmanov (Krylia Sovetov)

Left backs

1. (Russia) Yuri Kovtun (Spartak Moscow)
2. (South Africa) Jacob Lekgetho (Lokomotiv Moscow)
3. (Russia) Valeri Tsvetkov (Zenit)

Stoppers

1. (Russia) Sergei Ignashevich (Lokomotiv Moscow)
2. (Russia) Aleksei Katulsky (Zenit)
3. (Ukraine) Dmytro Parfenov (Spartak Moscow)

Defensive midfielders

1. (Russia) Marat Izmailov (Lokomotiv Moscow)
2. (Russia) Dmitri Loskov (Lokomotiv Moscow)
3. (Ukraine) Olexandr Gorshkov (Zenit)

Right wingers

1. (Russia) Rolan Gusev (Dynamo Moscow)
2. (Russia) Andrei Arshavin (Zenit)
3. (Russia) Andrei Konovalov (Krylia Sovetov)

Central midfielders

1. (Russia) Yegor Titov (Spartak Moscow)
2. (Russia) Valery Yesipov (Rotor)
3. (Russia) Andrey Tikhonov (Krylia Sovetov)

Left wingers

1. (Russia) Andrei Karyaka (Krylia Sovetov)
2. (Ukraine) Olexandr Spivak (Zenit)
3. (Uzbekistan) Ruslan Agalarov (Anzhi)

Right forwards

1. (Russia) Vladimir Beschastnykh (Spartak Moscow)
2. (Russia) Dmitri Vyazmikin (Torpedo Moscow)
3. (Nigeria) James Obiorah (Lokomotiv Moscow)

Left forwards

1. (Russia) Sergei Semak (CSKA Moscow)
2. (Russia) Ruslan Pimenov (Lokomotiv Moscow)
3. (Russia) Aleksandr Kerzhakov (Zenit)

== Medal squads ==
1. FC Spartak Moscow

Goalkeepers: Maksym Levytskyi (Ukraine) (20), Aleksandr Filimonov (8), Maksim Kabanov (3).
Defenders: Igor Mitreski (North Macedonia) (27), Dmytro Parfenov (Ukraine) (26 / 4), Yuri Kovtun (26 / 1), Jerry-Christian Tchuissé (Cameroon) (22), Dmitri Ananko (13), Oleksandr Hranovskyi (Ukraine) (8 / 1), Dmitri Bugakov (5), Mikhail Kupriyanov (4), Ibra Kébé (Senegal) (4), Igor Stamenovski (North Macedonia) (1), Andrei Streltsov (1).
Midfielders: Yegor Titov (30 / 11), Viktor Bulatov (29 / 2), Vasili Baranov (Belarus) (25 / 5), Eduard Tsykhmeystruk (Ukraine) (15 / 3), Maksym Kalynychenko (Ukraine) (9 / 2), Aleksandr Pavlenko (5), Kahaber Mzhavanadze (Georgia (country)) (4), Nikola Gjoševski (North Macedonia) (4), Lawrence Adjei (Ghana) (1), Yevhen Lysytsyn (Ukraine) (1).
Forwards: Luis Robson (Brazil) (28 / 11), Aleksandr Shirko (15 / 3), Vladimir Beschastnykh (12 / 9), Nikolai Pisarev (9 / 1), Jafar Irismetov (Uzbekistan) (8), Artyom Bezrodny (6 / 1), German Lovchev (5), Raman Vasilyuk (Belarus) (4 / 2), Marcão (Brazil) (3), Okon Flo Essien (Nigeria) (3), Aleksandr Danishevsky (2), Aleksandr Sonin (2).
(league appearances and goals listed in brackets)

Manager: Oleg Romantsev

Transferred out during the season: Aleksandr Shirko (to FC Torpedo Moscow), Nikolai Pisarev (to FC Torpedo-ZIL Moscow), Oleksandr Hranovskyi (Ukraine) (to (Ukraine) FC Karpaty Lviv), Jafar Irismetov (Uzbekistan) (on loan to (Belarus) FC Slavia Mozyr), Aleksandr Filimonov (to (Ukraine) FC Dynamo Kyiv), Dmitri Bugakov (to FC Sokol Saratov), Nikola Gjoševski (North Macedonia) (to (North Macedonia) FK Vardar), Marcão (Brazil) (to (Germany) FC St. Pauli).

2. FC Lokomotiv Moscow

Goalkeepers: Ruslan Nigmatullin (27), Platon Zakharchuk (3).
Defenders: Igor Chugainov (28 / 2), Jacob Lekgetho (South Africa) (25), Yuri Drozdov (24), Sergei Ignashevich (23), Gennadiy Nizhegorodov (21), Dmitri Sennikov (18), Vadim Evseev (13), Milan Obradović (Serbia) (12 / 1), Igor Cherevchenko (Tajikistan) (10), Andrei Lavrik (Belarus) (5), Andrei Solomatin (3), Oleg Pashinin (Uzbekistan) (1).
Midfielders: Dmitri Loskov (29 / 12), Vladimir Maminov (Uzbekistan) (25 / 5), Albert Sarkisyan (Armenia) (16), Yevgeni Kharlachyov (3).
Forwards: Marat Izmailov (29 / 6), James Obiorah (Nigeria) (25 / 14), Maksim Buznikin (25 / 6), Ruslan Pimenov (23 / 3), Zaza Janashia (Georgia (country)) (20 / 2), Nemanja Vučićević (Serbia) (3).

One own goal each scored by Denis Yevsikov and Oleg Kornaukhov (both PFC CSKA Moscow).

Manager: Yuri Syomin

Transferred out during the season: Andrei Solomatin (to PFC CSKA Moscow), Yevgeni Kharlachyov (to FC Dynamo Moscow), Oleg Pashinin (Uzbekistan) (on loan to (Japan) Sanfrecce Hiroshima).

3. FC Zenit St. Petersburg

Goalkeepers: Vyacheslav Malafeev (28), Dmitri Borodin (3).
Defenders: Sargis Hovsepyan (Armenia) (27), Aleksei Katulsky (26 / 3), Aleksei Igonin (22), Valeri Tsvetkov (21), Maksim Demenko (19 / 6), Konstantin Lepyokhin (15 / 2), Igor Nedorezov (2).
Midfielders: Andrei Arshavin (29 / 4), Aleksandr Gorshkov (Ukraine) (28 / 6), Aleksandr Spivak (Ukraine) (27 / 3), Andrey Kobelev (24 / 6), Denis Ugarov (17), Barys Haravoy (Belarus) (14), Sergei Osipov (10 / 1), Konstantin Konoplyov (8), Sergei Vasyanovich (7 / 1), Aleksei Lazarev (2).
Forwards: Aleksandr Kerzhakov (28 / 6), Hennadiy Popovych (Ukraine) (24 / 7), Maksim Astafyev (9 / 3), Yevgeni Tarasov (Kazakhstan) (9 / 3), Dmitri Akimov (2), Dzmitry Aharodnik (Belarus) (2), Aleksandr Petukhov (1).

One own goal scored by Otar Khizaneishvili (Georgia (country)) (FC Rostselmash Rostov-on-Don).

Manager: Yury Morozov.

Transferred out during the season: none.

== See also ==
- 2001 in Russian football
