= Mudrinić =

Mudrinić is a surname. Notable people with the surname include:

- Vladimir Mudrinić (born 1976), Serbian football player and manager
- Ivica Mudrinić (born 1955), Croatian politician
