= Bugakov =

Bugakov (masculine, Russian: Бугаков) or Bugakova (feminine, Russian: Бугакова) is a Russian surname. Notable people with the surname include:

- Danil Bugakov (born 1988), Uzbekistani swimmer
- Dmitri Bugakov (born 1979), Russian footballer
- Mariya Bugakova (born 1985), Uzbekistani swimmer
