= Lepyokhin =

Lepyokhin (Russian: Лепёхин, from лепёшка meaning flatbread) is a Russian masculine surname, its feminine counterpart is Lepyokhina. It may refer to

- Ivan Lepyokhin (1740–1802), Russian naturalist, zoologist and botanist
- Konstantin Lepyokhin (born 1975), Russian football coach and a former player
