= Vyacheslav Malafeev =

Russian footballer (born 1979)

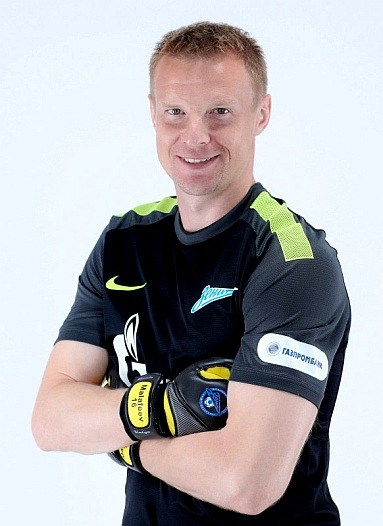
- Malafeev with Zenit Saint Petersburg in 2014

Personal information
- Full name: Vyacheslav Aleksandrovich Malafeev
- Date of birth: 4 March 1979 (age 47)
- Place of birth: Leningrad, Russian SFSR, Soviet Union
- Height: 1.85 m (6 ft 1 in)
- Position: Goalkeeper

Team information
- Current team: FC Zenit Saint Petersburg (assistant director of sports)

Senior career*
Years	Team	Apps	(Gls)
1997–1999	FC Zenit-2 St. Petersburg	54	(0)
1999–2016	FC Zenit St. Petersburg	322	(0)
Total		376	(0)

International career
1999–2000	Russia U-21	4	(0)
2003–2012	Russia	29	(0)

Managerial career
- 2018–: FC Zenit Saint Petersburg (assistant director of sports)
- * Club domestic league appearances and goals

Vyacheslav Aleksandrovich Malafeev (Russian: Вячесла́в Алекса́ндрович Малафе́ев, IPA: [vʲɪtɕɪˈslaf ɐlʲɪkˈsandrəvʲɪtɕ məlɐˈfʲe(j)ɪf]; born 4 March 1979) is a Russian football official and former player who played as a goalkeeper. He is a one-club man, having spent all 17 of his professional seasons with Zenit Saint Petersburg. He also represented the Russian national team, earning 29 caps. He worked as an assistant director of sports for Zenit from 2016 to 2020.

== Club career ==
Vyacheslav Malafeev started attending the Smena football school at the age of nine. In 1997, he began to play for the farm club of FC Zenit, Zenit-2, in the Third Division. He got the chance to play for Zenit in the Premier League in 1999 during the suspension of Roman Berezovsky. Malafeev later became the first choice goalkeeper for Zenit in 2001, after Berezovsky left the club. Malafeev eventually became the first-choice goalkeeper ahead of Kamil Čontofalský and won the UEFA Cup in 2008 after keeping a clean sheet against Rangers in the final.

== International career ==
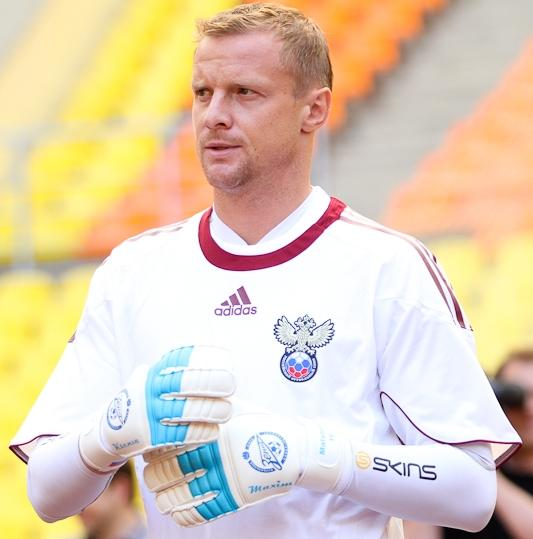
Malafeev with the Russia national team in 2011

On 19 November 2003, Malafeev debuted as a goalkeeper for the national team in a Euro 2004 qualifiers play-off against Wales. He was chosen as the second choice goalkeeper behind Sergei Ovchinnikov and ahead of Igor Akinfeev. Malafeev participated in Euro 2004 coming on after Ovchinnikov's red card against Portugal and starting against Greece.

After Euro 2004, Malafeev, became the first choice goalkeeper for Russia succeeding Ovchinnikov. After a long-term injury in May 2005, Malafeev lost his place in the goal for Zenit and Russia to Kamil Čontofalský and Igor Akinfeev, respectively. In 2007, played in two Euro 2008 qualifiers against Andorra and Croatia after Akinfeev's long-term injury but was relegated to the bench in favor of Vladimir Gabulov. After Zenit's successful UEFA Cup campaign he lost a narrow battle with Igor Akinfeev for the first choice goalkeeper spot in Russia's Euro 2008 squad. Nonetheless, he stayed on as the second choice goalkeeper ahead of Gabulov.

He was the starting goalkeeper in the game that Russia lost to Portugal with a score of 1–7 in the 2006 FIFA World Cup qualifier.

He was confirmed for the finalized UEFA Euro 2012 squad on 25 May 2012. After the UEFA Euro 2012 he announced that he is retiring from the national team to spend more time with his children, but is prepared to be called up in case of emergency such as injuries to other top goalkeepers.

== Career statistics ==
As of 1 June 2015

Club	Season	League			Russian Cup		Europe		Other		Total	
Club	Season	Division	Apps	Goals	Apps	Goals	Apps	Goals	Apps	Goals	Apps	Goals
Zenit Saint Petersburg	1999	Russian Top Division	8	0	0	0	—		—		8	0
Zenit Saint Petersburg	2000	Russian Top Division	12	0	0	0	5	0	—		17	0
Zenit Saint Petersburg	2001	Russian Top Division	28	0	2	0	—		—		30	0
Zenit Saint Petersburg	2002	Russian Premier League	29	0	5	0	3	0	—		37	0
Zenit Saint Petersburg	2003	Russian Premier League	27	0	2	0	—		3	0	32	0
Zenit Saint Petersburg	2004	Russian Premier League	19	0	0	0	7	0	—		26	0
Zenit Saint Petersburg	2005	Russian Premier League	11	0	6	0	—		—		17	0
Zenit Saint Petersburg	2006	Russian Premier League	26	0	5	0	5	0	—		36	0
Zenit Saint Petersburg	2007	Russian Premier League	19	0	5	0	2	0	—		26	0
Zenit Saint Petersburg	2008	Russian Premier League	30	0	1	0	15	0	2 (Note: One appearance in Russian Super Cup, one appearance in UEFA Super Cup)	0	48	0
Zenit Saint Petersburg	2009	Russian Premier League	28	0	1	0	1	0	—		30	0
Zenit Saint Petersburg	2010	Russian Premier League	15	0	2	0	4	0	—		21	0
Zenit Saint Petersburg	2011–12	Russian Premier League	41	0	1	0	7	0	1 (Note: Appearance in Russian Super Cup)	0	50	0
Zenit Saint Petersburg	2012–13	Russian Premier League	26	0	4	0	9	0	1	0	40	0
Zenit Saint Petersburg	2013–14	Russian Premier League	1	0	0	0	1	0	—		2	0
Zenit Saint Petersburg	2014–15	Russian Premier League	2	0	2	0	—		—		4	0
Career total			322	0	36	0	59	0	7	0	418	0

== Personal life ==
Vyacheslav and his wife Marina had two children: Ksenia and Maxim. Marina Malafeeva died in a car crash on the morning of 17 March 2011, aged 37. His second wife is Ekaterina Malafeeva, they married in December 2012 and broke up in September 2021. They also have a child named Alex. In February 2025 he married the Olympic silver medalist and world champion rhythmic gymnast Angelina Shkatova.

== Honours ==
=== Club ===
Zenit

- Russian Premier League: 2007, 2010, 2011–12, 2014–15
- Russian Cup: 1998–99, 2009–10
- Russian Premier League Cup: 2003
- Russian Super Cup: 2008, 2011
- UEFA Cup: 2007–08
- UEFA Super Cup: 2008

=== International ===
Russia

- UEFA European Championship bronze medalist: 2008
