= Sergei Losev =

Russian footballer

Personal information
- Full name: Sergei Vladimirovich Losev
- Date of birth: 31 July 1983 (age 43)
- Place of birth: Leningrad, Soviet Union
- Height: 1.95 m (6 ft 5 in)
- Position: Goalkeeper

Youth career
- DYuSSh Smena-Zenit

Senior career*
Years	Team	Apps	(Gls)
2001–2003	FC Zenit St. Petersburg	0	(0)
2004–2005	FC Tom Tomsk	1	(0)
2006–2007	FC Kuban Krasnodar	1	(0)
2008	FC Dynamo Barnaul	14	(0)
2010–2015	FC Neftekhimik Nizhnekamsk	129	(0)

International career
2005	Russia U-21	2	(0)
- * Club domestic league appearances and goals

Sergei Vladimirovich Losev (Russian: Серге́й Владимирович Лосев; born 31 July 1983) is a Russian former professional football player.

== Club career ==
He made his debut for FC Zenit St. Petersburg on 20 August 2003 in the Russian Premier League Cup semifinal against FC Torpedo Moscow, substituting Vyacheslav Malafeev in added time. Zenit eventually won that cup.

He played 5 seasons in the Russian Football National League for 4 different clubs.
