= Eduard Gikayev =

Russian footballer

Personal information
- Full name: Eduard Sergeyevich Gikayev
- Date of birth: 14 August 1979 (age 47)
- Place of birth: Tbilisi, Georgian SSR
- Height: 1.91 m (6 ft 3 in)
- Position: Defender

Senior career*
Years	Team	Apps	(Gls)
1997	FC Iriston Vladikavkaz	9	(0)
1998	FC Alania-2 Vladikavkaz	39	(1)
1999	FC Iriston Vladikavkaz	30	(2)
2000–2001	FC Avtodor Vladikavkaz	46	(6)
2001–2003	FC Alania Vladikavkaz	12	(0)
2003–2006	FC KAMAZ Naberezhnye Chelny	68	(0)
2006	FC Fakel Voronezh	16	(0)
2007	FC Mashuk-KMV Pyatigorsk	9	(0)
2008	FC Zhemchuzhina-Sochi Sochi	17	(0)
2009–2010	FC Dynamo Bryansk	28	(0)
2010	FC Gubkin	15	(0)
2011–2012	FC Dynamo Vologda	45	(0)
- * Club domestic league appearances and goals

Eduard Sergeyevich Gikayev (Russian: Эдуард Серге́евич Гикаев; born 14 August 1979) is a former Russian professional footballer.

== Club career ==
He made his debut in the Russian Premier League in 2001 for FC Alania Vladikavkaz.
