= Igor Stamenovski =

Macedonian footballer

Personal information
- Date of birth: 16 June 1980 (age 46)
- Place of birth: Delčevo, SFR Yugoslavia
- Height: 1.80 m (5 ft 11 in)
- Position: Defender

Youth career
- Bregalnica Delčevo

Senior career*
| Years | Team | Apps | (Gls) |
| 1997–1999 | Makedonija | | |
| 1999–2000 | Pelister | 12 | (0) |
| 2000 | Velbazhd Kyustendil | 1 | (0) |
| 2001–2003 | Spartak Moscow | 1 | (0) |
| 2004 | Baltika Kaliningrad | 3 | (0) |
- * Club domestic league appearances and goals

Igor Stamenovski (Macedonian: Игор Стаменовски; born 16 June 1980) is a former Macedonian professional footballer.

== Club career ==
He made his debut in the Russian Premier League in 2001 for FC Spartak Moscow.

== Honours ==
- Macedonian Prva Liga bronze: 1998.
- Russian Premier League champion: 2001.
