= Roman Tseryuta =

Russian footballer and manager

Personal information
- Full name: Roman Stanislavovich Tseryuta
- Date of birth: 1 November 1982 (age 43)
- Place of birth: Goryachevodsky, Russian SFSR
- Height: 1.85 m (6 ft 1 in)
- Position: Defender

Team information
- Current team: FC Arsenal Tula (analyst)

Senior career*
| Years | Team | Apps | (Gls) |
| 1998 | FC Mashuk Pyatigorsk | | |
| 1999–2000 | FC Olimpia Volgograd | 23 | (3) |
| 2001–2002 | FC Krasnodar-2000 | 34 | (7) |
| 2002–2003 | FC Saturn-RenTV Ramenskoye | 4 | (0) |
| 2004 | FC Kuban Krasnodar | 0 | (0) |
| 2004 | FC Dynamo Makhachkala | 6 | (0) |
| 2005 | FC Krasnodar-2000 | 11 | (1) |
| 2005 | FC Amur Blagoveshchensk | 10 | (0) |
| 2006 | FC Baltika Kaliningrad | 31 | (1) |
| 2007 | FC Mashuk-KMV Pyatigorsk | 0 | (0) |
| 2007 | FC Dynamo St. Petersburg | 4 | (0) |
| 2008–2009 | FC Krasnodar-2000 | 34 | (2) |
| 2010 | FC Irtysh Omsk | 11 | (0) |
| 2011 | FC Zenit Penza | 6 | (0) |

Managerial career
- 2017: FC Krasnodar-2
- 2020: FC Rostov (chief analyst)
- 2021: FC Krasnodar (U19)
- 2022–2023: FC Krasnodar (U16)
- 2023: FC Krasnodar-2 (assistant)
- 2024–: FC Arsenal Tula (analyst)
- * Club domestic league appearances and goals

Roman Stanislavovich Tseryuta (Russian: Роман Станиславович Церюта; born 1 November 1982) is a Russian professional football manager and a former player who is a coach-analyst with FC Arsenal Tula.

== Club career ==
He made his debut in the Russian Premier League in 2002 for FC Saturn-RenTV Ramenskoye.
