= Tony Coyle (South African soccer) =

South African footballer

Personal information
- Full name: Tony David Coyle
- Date of birth: 29 October 1976 (age 50)
- Height: 1.84 m (6 ft 0 in)
- Position: Central defender

Senior career*
Years	Team	Apps	(Gls)
1998–2003	Wits University	92	(5)
2003–2005	FC Rostov	25	(0)
2006–2007	Supersport United	0	(0)
2007	Orlando Pirates	1	(0)

International career
2002–2004	South Africa	12	(0)
- * Club domestic league appearances and goals

Tony David Coyle (born 29 October 1976) is a South African former soccer player who played as a central defender.
