= Darius Miceika =

Lithuanian footballer

Personal information
- Date of birth: 22 February 1983 (age 43)
- Place of birth: Vilnius, Lithuanian SSR, Soviet Union
- Height: 1.80 m (5 ft 11 in)
- Position: Midfielder

Senior career*
Years	Team	Apps	(Gls)
2000	Polonija Vilnius	5	(0)
2001–2002	Žalgiris Vilnius	26	(4)
2002–2004	Zenit Saint Petersburg	8	(1)
2005–2008	Liepājas Metalurgs	63	(19)
2009	Granit Mikashevichi	13	(1)
2009–2010	Metalurh Zaporizhya	14	(0)
2010	Liepājas Metalurgs	10	(0)
2011–2012	Khimki	37	(2)
2012–2014	SKA-Energiya Khabarovsk	8	(0)
2014	Trakai	28	(4)
2015	Sillamäe Kalev	5	(0)

International career
2005–2009	Lithuania	10	(1)
- * Club domestic league appearances and goals

Darius Miceika (born 22 February 1983) is a Lithuanian former professional footballer. He has played for Lithuanian national team.

== Club career ==
Miceika started his career at Polonija Vilnius in 2000. He then moved to FK Žalgiris Vilnius in 2001 before moving to Russian Premier League club FC Zenit Saint Petersburg in 2002, with whom he won the Russian Premier League Cup in 2003. He moved to Latvia in 2005 with Virslīga club, Liepājas Metalurgs. In his first season at the club, 2005, he scored in the 2–1 Latvian Cup final defeat to FK Ventspils on 25 September. In the 2006 Virslīga season he was third top scorer in the league with 13 goals and second top Liepājas Metalurgs scorer. He scored a hat-trick on 26 April in a 6–1 win over Dižvanagi Rēzekne. In December 2006 he was named joint best midfielder with Skonto player, Vitālijs Astafjevs for the 2006 season in Latvia by the Latvian Football Federation. He spent the first half of 2009 playing for Granit Mikashevichi in the Belarusian Premier League. During the summer transfer window of 2009 he was transferred to FC Metalurh Zaporizhya.

In August 2010 he joined the Latvian champions FK Liepājas Metalurgs once again, that season playing 10 matches and scoring no goals in the LMT Virsliga. After the 2010 season he was released from the club.

== International career ==
Miceika made his debut for Lithuania on 6 September 2006, against Scotland. Brought on as a substitute after 81 minutes, four minutes later he scored a goal, which ended up being his only goal for national team. Despite his goal, Lithuania lost the match 2–1.

=== International goal ===
Scores and results list Lithuania's goal tally first.

No	Date	Venue	Opponent	Score	Result	Competition
1.	6 September 2006	S.Darius and S.Girėnas, Kaunas, Lithuania	Scotland	1–2	1–2	Euro 2008 qualifier

== Honours ==
- FC Zenit Saint Petersburg
  - Russian Premier League runner-up (1): 2003
  - Russian Premier League Cup winner (1): 2003
- FK Liepājas Metalurgs
  - Virslīga winner (1): 2005
  - Virslīga runner-up (3): 2006, 2007, 2008
  - Latvian Cup winner (1): 2006
  - Baltic League winner (1): 2007
