= Daniel Chiriță =

Romanian footballer (born 1974)

Personal information
- Date of birth: 24 March 1974 (age 52)
- Place of birth: Ploiești, Romania
- Height: 1.80 m (5 ft 11 in)
- Position: Defender

Senior career*
| Years | Team | Apps | (Gls) |
| 1992–1998 | Petrolul Ploiești | 165 | (1) |
| 1998 | FC U Craiova | 15 | (0) |
| 1999–2001 | Rapid București | 49 | (4) |
| 2001 | → Național București (loan) | 12 | (2) |
| 2002 | Shakhtar Donetsk | 1 | (0) |
| 2002 | → Shakhtar-2 Donetsk | 4 | (0) |
| 2002–2004 | Zenit Saint Petersburg | 47 | (2) |
| 2005–2006 | Stal Alchevsk | 20 | (0) |
| 2006–2007 | UTA Arad | 43 | (0) |
| 2008–2009 | FC Ploiești | 6 | (0) |
| 2009–2010 | Petrolul Ploiești | 29 | (1) |
| 2010–2011 | AFC Filipeștii de Pădure | | |
| 2011–2012 | CS Ștefănești | | |
| 2016–2017 | Petrolul Ploiești | | |
| Total | | 387 | (10) |

International career
| 1994–1995 | Romania U21 | 9 | (0) |
| 1994 | Romania | 1 | (0) |
- * Club domestic league appearances and goals

Daniel Chiriță (born 24 March 1974) is a Romanian former professional footballer who played as a defender.

== Personal life ==
His son, Alexandru, is also a football player. They played together at AFC Filipeștii de Pădure and CS Ștefănești.

== Honours ==
Petrolul Ploiești

- Cupa României: 1994–95

Rapid București

- Divizia A: 1998–99
- Cupa României: 2001–02
- Supercupa României: 1999

Zenit Saint Petersburg

- Russian Premier League Cup: 2003
