= Dmitri Makarov (footballer) =

Russian footballer

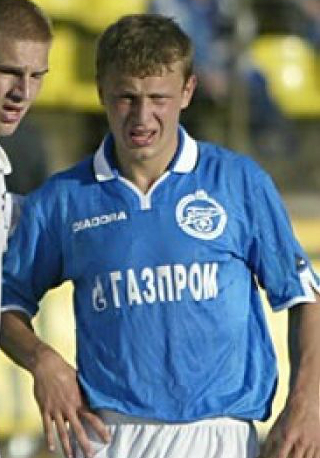
- Makarov in 2002

Personal information
- Full name: Dmitri Alekseyevich Makarov
- Date of birth: 16 September 1982 (age 44)
- Place of birth: Leningrad, Russian SFSR
- Height: 1.78 m (5 ft 10 in)
- Position: Forward

Youth career
- Smena St. Petersburg

Senior career*
Years	Team	Apps	(Gls)
2000	FC Zenit-2 St. Petersburg	14	(1)
2001	FC Lokomotiv-Zenit-2 St. Petersburg	27	(9)
2002–2004	FC Zenit St. Petersburg	26	(3)
2005	FC Amkar Perm	14	(1)

Managerial career
- 2008–2009: FC Zenit St. Petersburg (reserves director)
- * Club domestic league appearances and goals

Dmitri Alekseyevich Makarov (Russian: Дмитрий Алексеевич Макаров; born 16 September 1982) is a former Russian professional footballer.

== Club career ==
He made his professional debut in the Russian Second Division in 2000 for FC Zenit-2 St. Petersburg. He had to retire as player while he was still very young due to serious injury.

== Honours ==
- Russian Premier League runner-up: 2003.
- Russian Premier League Cup winner: 2003.

== European club competitions ==
With FC Zenit St. Petersburg.

- UEFA Cup 2002–03: 2 games, 1 goal.
- UEFA Cup 2004–05: 4 games, 1 goal.
