= Mićo Vranješ =

Serbian footballer

Personal information
- Full name: Mićo Vranješ
- Date of birth: 8 September 1975 (age 51)
- Place of birth: Novi Sad, SFR Yugoslavia
- Height: 1.83 m (6 ft 0 in)
- Position: Defender

Youth career
- Vojvodina

Senior career*
Years	Team	Apps	(Gls)
1993–2000	Vojvodina	87	(5)
2000–2002	CSKA Sofia	37	(1)
2003	Uralan Elista	20	(0)
2004	Pécs	15	(0)
2004–2006	Groclin Dyskobolia	30	(5)
2007	Mladenovac	11	(1)
Total		200	(12)

International career
1997	FR Yugoslavia U21 (Note: Official UEFA matches only)	2	(0)
- * Club domestic league appearances and goals

Mićo Vranješ (Serbian Cyrillic: Мићо Врањеш; born 8 September 1975) is a Serbian retired footballer who played as a defender.

== Club career ==
After playing for Vojvodina, Vranješ moved abroad and joined Bulgarian club CSKA Sofia in 2000. He would also play professionally for Russian club Uralan Elista, Hungarian side Pécs, and Polish outfit Groclin Dyskobolia.

== International career ==
At international level, Vranješ was capped for FR Yugoslavia U21.
