= Viktor Lopatyonok =

Russian footballer (born 1984)

Personal information
- Full name: Viktor Sergeyevich Lopatyonok
- Date of birth: 18 February 1984 (age 42)
- Height: 1.76 m (5 ft 9 1/2 in)
- Positions: Defender; midfielder

Youth career
- DYuSSh Smena-Zenit

Senior career*
Years	Team	Apps	(Gls)
2002–2004	FC Zenit Saint Petersburg	0	(0)
2004	→ FC Zenit-2 Saint Petersburg	26	(0)
2005	FC Petrotrest Saint Petersburg	13	(0)
2005	FC Dynamo Vologda	7	(0)
2006–2007	FC Lipton Saint Petersburg		
- * Club domestic league appearances and goals

Viktor Sergeyevich Lopatyonok (Russian: Виктор Сергеевич Лопатёнок; born 18 February 1984) is a former Russian footballer.

== Club career ==
He played in the Russian Football National League for FC Petrotrest Saint Petersburg in 2005.
