= Dmitri Davydov (footballer, born 1975) =

Russian footballer and manager

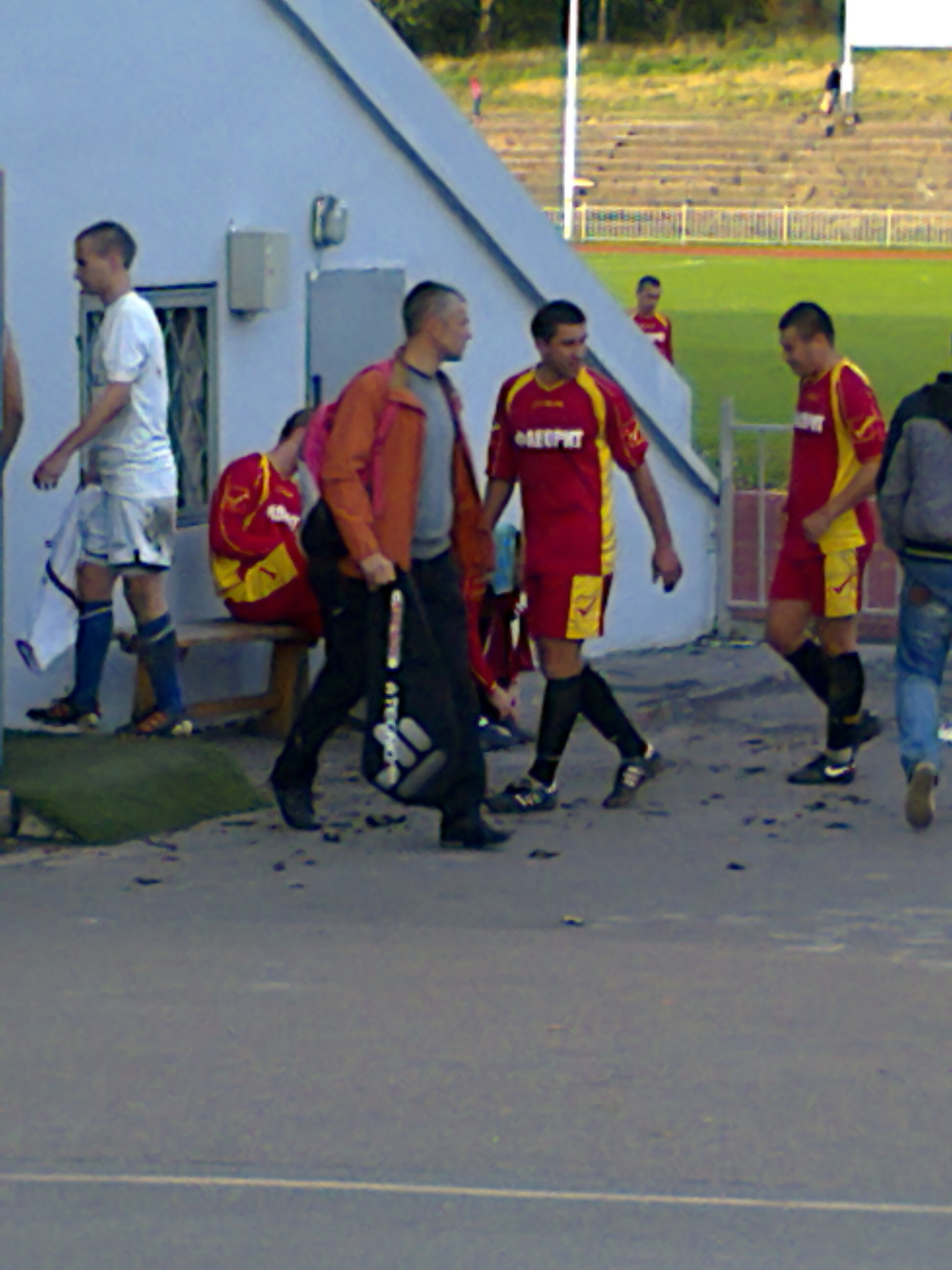

Personal information
- Full name: Dmitri Anatolyevich Davydov
- Date of birth: 22 January 1975 (age 51)
- Height: 1.76 m (5 ft 9 in)
- Position: Centre-back

Team information
- Current team: Zenit-2 Saint Petersburg (assistant coach)

Senior career*
Years	Team	Apps	(Gls)
1993	Zenit-2 Saint Petersburg	19	(0)
1994–2002	Zenit Saint Petersburg	164	(2)
2003–2004	Metallurg Lipetsk	78	(1)
2005–2006	Luch-Energiya Vladivostok	43	(0)
2007	Zenit-2 Saint Petersburg	28	(0)
2008–2010	Dynamo Saint Petersburg	78	(0)

International career
1996–1998	Russia U21	13	(0)

Managerial career
- 2015–2018: Zenit Saint Petersburg (reserves asst)
- 2018–2022: Zenit-2 Saint Petersburg (assistant)
- 2022–2023: Zenit-2 Saint Petersburg
- 2023–: Zenit-2 Saint Petersburg (assistant)
- * Club domestic league appearances and goals

Dmitri Anatolyevich Davydov (Russian: Дмитрий Анатольевич Давыдов; born 22 January 1975) is a Russian professional football manager and a former player. He is an assistant coach with Zenit-2 Saint Petersburg.

== Playing career ==
He made his debut in the Russian Premier League in 1996 for Zenit Saint Petersburg.

== Personal life ==
He is a son of the former Zenit Saint Petersburg player and manager Anatoli Davydov.
