= Valentin Filatov =

Russian footballer

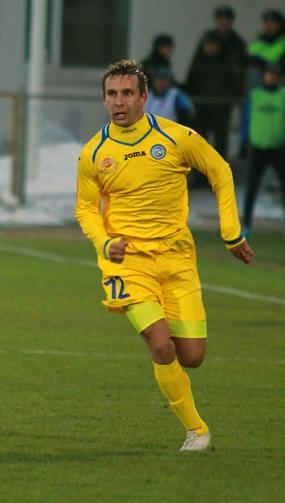
- With Rostov in 2012

Personal information
- Full name: Valentin Vladimirovich Filatov
- Date of birth: 19 March 1982 (age 44)
- Place of birth: Leningrad, Russian SFSR
- Height: 1.76 m (5 ft 9 1/2 in)
- Position: Defender

Youth career
- Zvezda Saint Petersburg

Senior career*
Years	Team	Apps	(Gls)
2001	Lokomotiv-Zenit-2 St. Petersburg	24	(2)
2002–2004	Zenit St. Petersburg	21	(0)
2005	Nosta Novotroitsk	17	(1)
2005	Petrotrest St. Petersburg	14	(1)
2006	Unirea Urziceni	28	(1)
2007–2010	Spartak Nalchik	62	(1)
2011–2012	Rostov	11	(0)
2012–2013	Khimki	18	(0)
2013–2015	Tosno	32	(1)
2015–2016	Dynamo Saint Petersburg	20	(0)
Total		247	(7)
- * Club domestic league appearances and goals as of 8 December 2016

Valentin Vladimirovich Filatov (Russian: Валентин Владимирович Филатов; born 19 March 1982) is a Russian former footballer who played as a defender.

== Personal life ==
On 5 October 2003 Filatov's parents died in a car crash on their way to watch a league game of Zenit St. Petersburg, that led to a long depression for him and a drop-off in performance.
