= Aleksei Katulsky =

Russian footballer

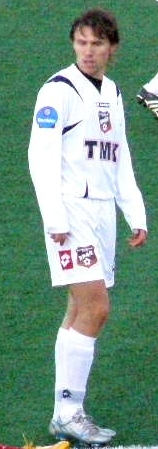

Personal information
- Full name: Aleksei Vladimirovich Katulsky
- Date of birth: 16 August 1977 (age 49)
- Place of birth: Leningrad, Soviet Union
- Height: 1.85 m (6 ft 1 in)
- Position: Defender

Youth career
- FC Smena St. Petersburg

Senior career*
Years	Team	Apps	(Gls)
1996–2000	FC Zenit-2 St. Petersburg	124	(6)
2000–2004	FC Zenit St. Petersburg	89	(5)
2005–2009	FC Ural Sverdlovsk Oblast	176	(9)
2010	FC Volga Nizhny Novgorod	4	(0)
2010–2011	FC Shinnik Yaroslavl	18	(0)
- * Club domestic league appearances and goals

Aleksei Vladimirovich Katulsky (Russian: Алексей Владимирович Катульский; born 16 August 1977) is a former Russian professional footballer.

== Club career ==
He made his debut in the Russian Premier League in 2000 for FC Zenit St. Petersburg.

== Honours ==
- Top-33 year-end best players list: 2000, 2001.
- Russian Premier League runner-up: 2003.
- Russian Premier League bronze: 2001.
- Russian Cup: 1999.
- Russian Premier League Cup: 2003

== European club competitions ==
- UEFA Intertoto Cup 2000 with FC Zenit St. Petersburg: 8 games.
- UEFA Cup 2004–05 with FC Zenit St. Petersburg: 1 game.
