= Semyon Melnikov =

Russian footballer

Personal information
- Full name: Semyon Vladimirovich Melnikov
- Date of birth: 27 January 1985 (age 41)
- Height: 1.85 m (6 ft 1 in)
- Position: Forward

Team information
- Current team: FC Dynamo St. Petersburg (assistant coach)

Youth career
- DYuSSh Smena-Zenit

Senior career*
Years	Team	Apps	(Gls)
2002–2009	FC Zenit St. Petersburg	1	(0)
2007	→ FC Luch-Energiya Vladivostok (loan)	8	(0)
2008–2009	→ FC Vityaz Podolsk (loan)	60	(10)
2010	FC Dynamo St. Petersburg	25	(1)
2011–2012	FC Metallurg-Kuzbass Novokuznetsk	9	(1)
2012–2013	FC Rus Saint Petersburg	18	(3)

Managerial career
- 2020–2023: FC Yadro St. Petersburg (assistant)
- 2023–: FC Dynamo St. Petersburg (assistant)
- 2024: FC Dynamo St. Petersburg (caretaker)
- * Club domestic league appearances and goals

Semyon Vladimirovich Melnikov (Russian: Семён Владимирович Мельников; born 27 January 1985) is a Russian professional football coach and a former player. He is an assistant coach with FC Dynamo St. Petersburg.

== Club career ==
He made his debut in the Russian Premier League in 2007 for FC Luch-Energiya Vladivostok.
