= Sergei Vasyanovich =

Russian footballer

Personal information
- Full name: Sergei Aleksandrovich Vasyanovich
- Date of birth: 8 July 1982 (age 44)
- Height: 1.76 m (5 ft 9 1/2 in)
- Position: Midfielder

Youth career
- Smena St. Petersburg

Senior career*
Years	Team	Apps	(Gls)
2000	FC Zenit-2 St. Petersburg	21	(0)
2001–2003	FC Zenit St. Petersburg	7	(1)
2002–2003	FC Zenit-2 St. Petersburg	33	(5)
2004–2005	FC Metallurg Lipetsk	47	(1)
2006	FC Petrotrest St. Petersburg	20	(5)
- * Club domestic league appearances and goals

Sergei Aleksandrovich Vasyanovich (Russian: Серге́й Александрович Васянович; born 8 July 1982) is a former Russian professional footballer.

== Club career ==
He made his professional debut in the Russian Second Division in 2000 for FC Zenit-2 St. Petersburg.

== Honours ==
- Russian Premier League bronze: 2001.
- Russian Premier League Cup winner: 2003.
