= Vladimir Mudrinić =

Serbian football manager and player

Personal information
- Full name: Vladimir Mudrinić
- Date of birth: 26 July 1976 (age 50)
- Place of birth: Kikinda, SFR Yugoslavia
- Height: 1.89 m (6 ft 2 in)
- Position: Midfielder

Youth career
- OFK Kikinda

Senior career*
Years	Team	Apps	(Gls)
1993–1996	OFK Kikinda	72	(20)
1997–1999	Vojvodina	55	(9)
2000–2001	Sartid Smederevo	62	(17)
2002–2004	Zenit Saint Petersburg	9	(1)
2003–2004	→ Sartid Smederevo (loan)	33	(3)
2004–2008	Red Star Belgrade	37	(1)
2006–2008	→ Smederevo (loan)	53	(10)
2009	Novi Sad	14	(2)
2009	Sevojno	10	(0)
2011–2013	Jedinstvo Užice	48	(10)
2013–2016	Zlatibor Čajetina	24	(9)
Total		417	(82)

Managerial career
- 2016–2018: Zlatibor Čajetina
- 2018–2019: Drina Ljubovija
- * Club domestic league appearances and goals

Vladimir Mudrinić (Serbian Cyrillic: Владимир Мудринић; born 26 July 1976) is a Serbian football manager and former player.

Mudrinić, who played for five clubs in the UEFA Europa League/UEFA Cup (including qualifiers), is best known for his spells at Smederevo (formerly Sartid) and also his ability to score goals from long range, including being a free-kick specialist.

== Playing career ==
Mudrinić made his senior debut with his hometown's OFK Kikinda in the second part of the 1992–93 First League of FR Yugoslavia, aged 16. He spent the next four years with the club, playing alongside future national team players Mladen Krstajić and Dragan Žilić, before transferring to Vojvodina in the winter of 1997. Mudrinić stayed there for three years, reaching the 1998 UEFA Intertoto Cup final. He then moved to Sartid Smederevo in the winter of 2000, together with his teammates Milorad Mrdak and Boris Vasković.

While with the Oklopnici, Mudrinić became one of the best players in the league, securing him a transfer to Russian club Zenit Saint Petersburg in January 2002. He made nine league appearances and scored one goal for the side during the 2002 season. In the winter of 2003, Mudrinić returned to Sartid Smederevo, helping the team win the 2002–03 Serbia and Montenegro Cup. He also played for the club in the 2003–04 season.

In October 2004, Mudrinić signed a contract with Red Star Belgrade. He collected the double in the 2005–06 season under the guidance of Walter Zenga. Over the next two seasons, Mudrinić played on loan at his former club Smederevo, before leaving them following their relegation from the top flight in 2008.

== Managerial career ==
Immediately after hanging up his boots, Mudrinić was appointed as manager of Zlatibor Čajetina. He was replaced by Predrag Ristanović in January 2018. Later that year, Mudrinić took charge of Drina Ljubovija.

== Career statistics ==
Appearances and goals by club, season and competition
Club	Season	League			Cup		Continental		Total	
Club	Season	Division	Apps	Goals	Apps	Goals	Apps	Goals	Apps	Goals
Vojvodina	1996–97	First League of FR Yugoslavia	11	1			0	0	11	1
Vojvodina	1997–98	First League of FR Yugoslavia	21	2			0	0	21	2
Vojvodina	1998–99	First League of FR Yugoslavia	15	5			1	0	16	5
Vojvodina	1999–2000	First League of FR Yugoslavia	8	1			2	0	10	1
Vojvodina	Total		55	9			3	0	58	9
Sartid Smederevo	1999–2000	First League of FR Yugoslavia	20	2	0	0	—		20	2
Sartid Smederevo	2000–01	First League of FR Yugoslavia	26	9	2	1	—		28	10
Sartid Smederevo	2001–02	First League of FR Yugoslavia	16	6			3	3	19	9
Sartid Smederevo	Total		62	17	2	1	3	3	67	21
Zenit Saint Petersburg	2002	Russian Premier League	9	1	1	0	1	0	11	1
Sartid Smederevo (loan)	2002–03	First League of Serbia and Montenegro	10	1	2	0	0	0	12	1
Sartid Smederevo (loan)	2003–04	First League of Serbia and Montenegro	23	2			4	1	27	3
Sartid Smederevo (loan)	Total		33	3	2	0	4	1	39	14
Red Star Belgrade	2004–05	First League of Serbia and Montenegro	17	1	4	0	0	0	21	1
Red Star Belgrade	2005–06	First League of Serbia and Montenegro	20	0	2	0	7	0	29	0
Red Star Belgrade	Total		37	1	6	0	7	0	50	1
Smederevo (loan)	2006–07	Serbian SuperLiga	25	5			—		25	5
Smederevo (loan)	2007–08	Serbian SuperLiga	28	5	1	0	—		29	5
Smederevo (loan)	Total		53	10	1	0	—		54	10
Career total			249	41	12	1	18	4	279	46

== Honours ==
Sartid Smederevo

- Serbia and Montenegro Cup: 2002–03

Red Star Belgrade

- First League of Serbia and Montenegro: 2005–06
- Serbia and Montenegro Cup: 2005–06

Jedinstvo Užice

- Drina Zone League: 2010–11
- Serbian League West: 2011–12

Zlatibor Čajetina

- Zlatibor District League: 2013–14
- Drina Zone League: 2015–16
