= Andrei Nikolayev (footballer, born 1982) =

Russian footballer

Personal information
- Full name: Andrei Aleksandrovich Nikolayev
- Date of birth: 30 August 1982 (age 44)
- Place of birth: Lomonosov, Soviet Union
- Height: 1.81 m (5 ft 11 1/2 in)
- Position: Forward

Youth career
- FC Severstal Cherepovets

Senior career*
Years	Team	Apps	(Gls)
2000	FC Severstal Cherepovets	34	(13)
2001	FC Lokomotiv-Zenit-2 St. Petersburg	37	(8)
2002–2003	FC Zenit St. Petersburg	9	(2)
2004–2005	FC Moscow	11	(2)
2005	→ FC Metallurg-Kuzbass Novokuznetsk (loan)	19	(7)
2006–2007	FC Sibir Novosibirsk	30	(2)
2007	→ FK Rīga (loan)	26	(15)
2008	FC Salyut-Energia Belgorod	16	(1)
2008	FC Metallurg-Kuzbass Novokuznetsk	17	(2)
2009	FC Volgar-Gazprom Astrakhan	32	(5)
2010	FC Nizhny Novgorod	0	(0)
2011	Skonto Riga	3	(0)
- * Club domestic league appearances and goals

Andrei Aleksandrovich Nikolayev (Russian: Андрей Александрович Николаев; born 30 August 1982) is a former Russian professional footballer.

== Club career ==
He made his debut in the Russian Premier League in 2002 for FC Zenit St. Petersburg, and played 1 game, scoring 1 goal in the UEFA Cup 2002–03 for them. In 2006, he was loaned to FK Rīga, playing in the Latvian Higher League. In 2011, he came back to Latvia, signing a contract with Skonto Riga.

== Honours ==
- Russian Premier League runner-up: 2003.
