= Valeri Tsvetkov =

Russian footballer

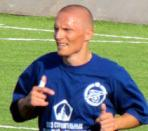

Personal information
- Full name: Valeri Vladimirovich Tsvetkov
- Date of birth: 5 November 1977 (age 48)
- Place of birth: Pskov, Russian SFSR
- Height: 1.72 m (5 ft 7 1/2 in)
- Positions: Defender; midfielder

Senior career*
Years	Team	Apps	(Gls)
1999–2000	FC Pskov	7	(0)
2000–2005	FC Zenit St. Petersburg	74	(2)

Managerial career
- 2013–2014: FC Rus Saint Petersburg (assistant)
- * Club domestic league appearances and goals

Valeri Vladimirovich Tsvetkov (Russian: Валерий Владимирович Цветков; born 5 November 1977) is a Russian professional football coach and a former player. He made his professional debut in the Russian Second Division in 2000 for FC Pskov.

== Honours ==
- Russian Premier League runner-up: 2003
- Russian Premier League bronze: 2001
- Top 33 year-end best players list: 2001
- Russian Cup finalist: 2002
- Russian Premier League Cup winner: 2003

== European club competitions ==
FC Zenit St. Petersburg

- UEFA Intertoto Cup 2000: 8 games
- UEFA Cup 2002–03: 3 games
