= Sergei Osipov (footballer, born 1978) =

Russian footballer

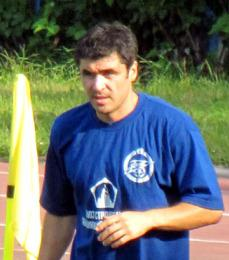

Personal information
- Full name: Sergei Aleksandrovich Osipov
- Date of birth: 10 July 1978 (age 48)
- Place of birth: Leningrad, Russian SFSR
- Height: 1.82 m (5 ft 11 1/2 in)
- Positions: Forward; midfielder

Senior career*
Years	Team	Apps	(Gls)
1996	FC Zenit-d St. Petersburg	29	(1)
1997–2003	FC Zenit St. Petersburg	86	(5)
2003–2005	FC Torpedo Moscow	39	(4)
2005–2008	FC Chornomorets Odesa	22	(1)

International career
1999	Russia U-21	5	(0)
- * Club domestic league appearances and goals

Sergei Aleksandrovich Osipov (Russian: Серге́й Александрович Осипов; born 10 July 1978) is a Russian former professional footballer.

== Club career ==
He made his professional debut in the Russian Third League in 1996 for FC Zenit-d St. Petersburg.

== Honours ==
- 1999: Russian Cup winner
- 2001: Russian Premier League bronze
- 2002: Russian Cup finalist
- 2003: Russian Premier League runner-up and Russian Premier League Cup winner
- 2006: Ukrainian Premier League bronze

== European club competitions ==
- UEFA Intertoto Cup 2000 with FC Zenit St. Petersburg: 5 games.
- UEFA Cup 2002–03 with FC Zenit St. Petersburg: 3 games, 3 goals.
- UEFA Cup 2003–04 with FC Torpedo Moscow: 4 games, 1 goal.
