= Alyaksandar Lukhvich =

Belarusian footballer (born 1970)

Personal information
- Date of birth: 21 February 1970 (age 56)
- Place of birth: Minsk, Belarusian SSR
- Height: 1.82 m (6 ft 0 in)
- Position: Defender

Youth career
- 1987–1990: Dinamo Minsk

Senior career*
Years	Team	Apps	(Gls)
1990–1997	Dinamo Minsk	145	(3)
1997	KAMAZ-Chally Naberezhnye Chelny	14	(1)
1998	Uralan Elista	29	(1)
1999–2004	Torpedo Moscow	144	(9)
2005	Dinamo Minsk	6	(0)
2006	Darida Minsk Raion	24	(0)
Total		362	(14)

International career
1996–2003	Belarus	33	(0)

Managerial career
- 2007–2010: Dinamo Minsk (assistant)
- 2011–2012: Bereza-2010
- 2014–2017: Minsk (assistant/reserves)
- 2017–2019: Minsk
- * Club domestic league appearances and goals

Alyaksandar Lukhvich (Belarusian: Аляксандар Лухвіч; Russian: Александр Анатольевич Лухвич; born 21 February 1970) is a Belarusian professional football coach and a former player.

== Club career ==
Lukhvich made his professional debut in the Soviet Top League in 1990 for FC Dinamo Minsk.

== Honours ==
Dinamo Minsk

- Belarusian Premier League: 1992, 1992–93, 1993–94, 1994–95, 1995, 1997
- Belarusian Cup: 1993–94
