= Dmitri Bugakov =

Russian footballer

Personal information
- Full name: Dmitri Vladimirovich Bugakov
- Date of birth: 19 June 1979 (age 47)
- Place of birth: Lipetsk, Russian SFSR
- Height: 1.84 m (6 ft 0 in)
- Positions: Defender; midfielder

Senior career*
Years	Team	Apps	(Gls)
1997–1998	FC Metallurg Lipetsk	27	(1)
1999–2000	FC Sokol Saratov	44	(0)
2001	FC Spartak Moscow	5	(0)
2001–2005	FC Sokol Saratov	147	(4)
2006	FC Salyut-Energiya Belgorod	34	(0)
2007	FC Metallurg Lipetsk	20	(0)

International career
2000–2001	Russia U-21	8	(0)

Managerial career
- 2018–2024: FC Metallurg Lipetsk (reserves)
- 2024: FC Metallurg Lipetsk (caretaker)
- 2024: FC Metallurg Lipetsk (assistant)
- 2024–2025: FC Metallurg Lipetsk
- * Club domestic league appearances and goals

Dmitri Vladimirovich Bugakov (Russian: Дмитрий Владимирович Бугаков; born 19 June 1979) is a Russian professional football coach and a former player.

== Club career ==
He made his professional debut in the Russian First Division in 1997 for FC Metallurg Lipetsk.

== Honours ==
- Russian Premier League champion: 2001.
