= Sergey Ivanov (footballer, born 1984) =

Russian footballer

Personal information
- Full name: Sergey Yuryevich Ivanov
- Date of birth: 16 June 1984 (age 42)
- Place of birth: Leningrad, Russian SFSR
- Height: 1.93 m (6 ft 4 in)
- Position: Goalkeeper

Youth career
- Smena St. Petersburg

Senior career*
Years	Team	Apps	(Gls)
2000	FC Petrovsky Zamok Moscow		
2001	FC Zenit St. Petersburg	0	(0)
2001	FC Lokomotiv-Zenit-2 St. Petersburg	9	(0)
2002–2004	FC Zenit St. Petersburg	8	(0)
2005	FC Zenit-2 St. Petersburg	1	(0)
2006	FC Spartak Nizhny Novgorod	23	(0)
2007	FC Alania Vladikavkaz	1	(0)
2008	FC Zenit-2 St. Petersburg	15	(0)
2008	FC Vityaz Podolsk	0	(0)

International career
2003–2004	Russia U-21	4	(0)
- * Club domestic league appearances and goals

Serge Yuryevich Ivanov (Russian: Серге́й Ю́рьевич Ивано́в; born 16 June 1984) is a former professional association football player from Russia.

== Club career ==
He made his professional debut in the Russian Second Division in 2001 for FC Lokomotiv-Zenit-2 St. Petersburg. He played 1 game in the UEFA Cup 2002–03 for FC Zenit St. Petersburg.

== Honours ==
- Russian Premier League Cup winner: 2003
