= Aleksei Lazarev =

Russian footballer

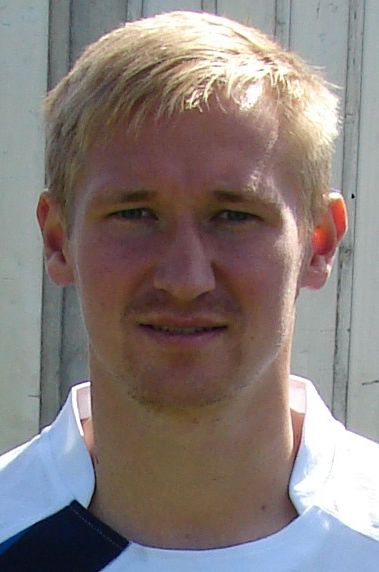

Personal information
- Full name: Aleksei Anatolyevich Lazarev
- Date of birth: 21 April 1981 (age 45)
- Height: 1.75 m (5 ft 9 in)
- Positions: Defender; midfielder

Youth career
- Kirovets-Nadezhda St. Petersburg

Senior career*
Years	Team	Apps	(Gls)
1999–2000	FC Zenit-2 St. Petersburg	54	(2)
2000–2002	FC Zenit St. Petersburg	3	(0)
2003–2005	FC Metallurg Lipetsk	66	(2)
2006–2007	FC Dynamo St. Petersburg	45	(1)
- * Club domestic league appearances and goals

Aleksei Anatolyevich Lazarev (Russian: Алексей Анатольевич Лазарев; born 21 April 1981) is a former Russian professional footballer.

== Club career ==
He made his professional debut in the Russian Second Division in 1999 for FC Zenit-2 St. Petersburg.

== Honours ==
- Russian Premier League bronze: 2001.
