= Aleksei Igonin =

Russian footballer

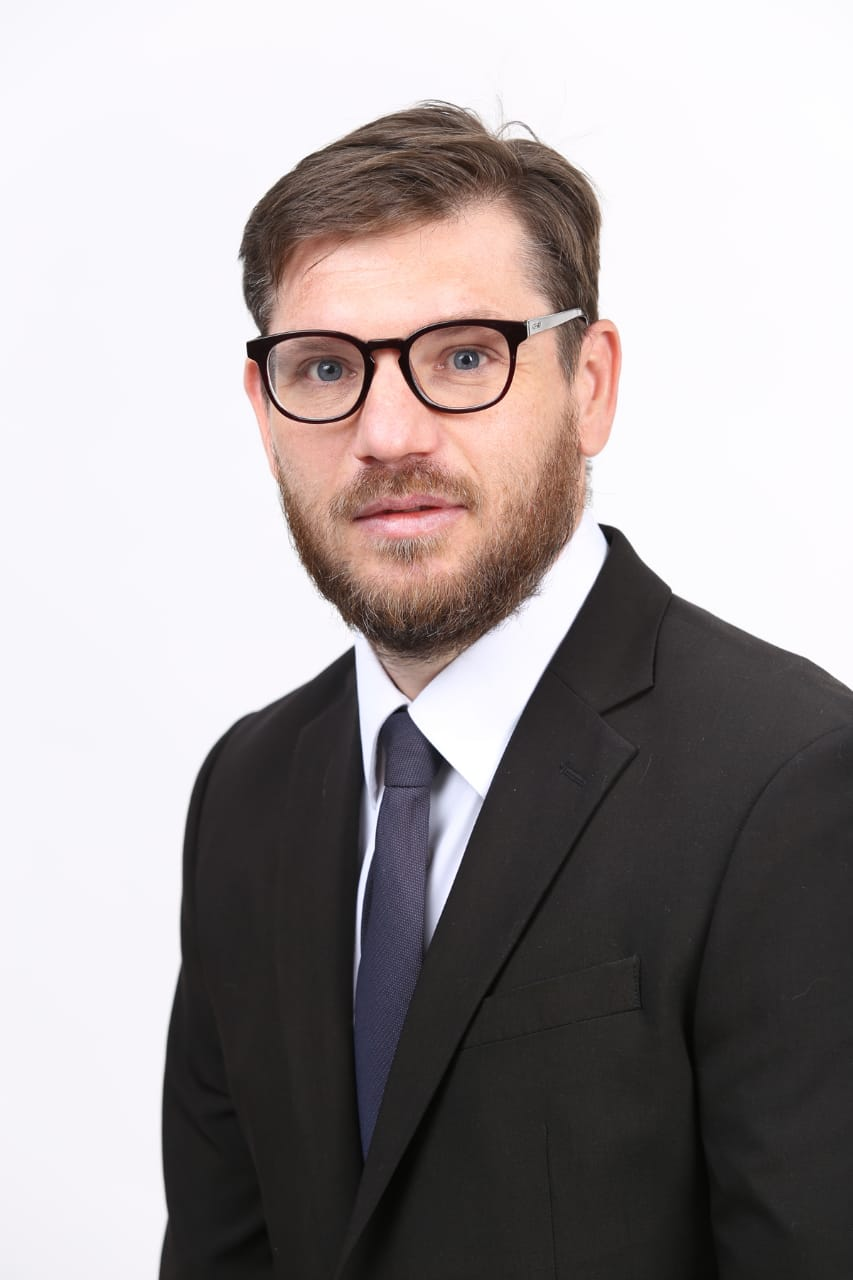

Personal information
- Full name: Aleksei Andreyevich Igonin
- Date of birth: 18 March 1976 (age 50)
- Place of birth: Leningrad, Soviet Union
- Height: 5 ft 10 in (1.78 m)
- Position: Defender

Youth career
- Smena Saint Petersburg
- Zenit Saint Petersburg

Senior career*
Years	Team	Apps	(Gls)
1995–1996	Zenit-d Saint Petersburg	39	(2)
1996–2003	Zenit Saint Petersburg	155	(6)
1999	Zenit-2 Saint Petersburg	2	(1)
2004	Chornomorets Odesa	12	(0)
2004–2010	Saturn Moscow Oblast	142	(1)
2011–2012	Anzhi Makhachkala	5	(0)

International career
1998	Russia	2	(0)
- * Club domestic league appearances and goals

Aleksei Andreyevich Igonin (Russian: Алексей Андреевич Игонин, born 18 March 1976) is a Russian politician and former professional football defender. He has been a Member of the Legislative Assembly of Leningrad Oblast since 2016 and often appears as a commentator on Russian television.

He won two caps for Russia in 1998.
