= Denis Ugarov =

Russian footballer and coach

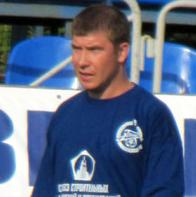

Personal information
- Full name: Denis Vyacheslavovich Ugarov
- Date of birth: 26 November 1975 (age 50)
- Place of birth: Leningrad, Russian SFSR
- Height: 1.73 m (5 ft 8 in)
- Position: Midfielder

Youth career
- FC Zenit St. Petersburg

Senior career*
| Years | Team | Apps | (Gls) |
| 1993 | FC Zenit-2 St. Petersburg | 27 | (0) |
| 1994–1997 | FC Zenit St. Petersburg | 100 | (0) |
| 1998 | FC Lokomotiv St. Petersburg | 13 | (0) |
| 1998 | FC Irtysh Omsk | 16 | (1) |
| 1999–2002 | FC Zenit St. Petersburg | 77 | (0) |
| 2003 | FC Metallurg Lipetsk | 26 | (0) |

Managerial career
- 2005: FC Zenit St. Petersburg (youth team)
- 2008–2009: FC Dynamo Moscow (reserves)
- 2009–2010: FC Dynamo Moscow (assistant)
- 2011–2012: PFC Krylia Sovetov Samara (assistant)
- 2015–2016: Sillamäe Kalev
- * Club domestic league appearances and goals

Denis Vyacheslavovich Ugarov (Russian: Денис Вячеславович Угаров; born 26 November 1975) is a Russian professional football coach and a former player.

== Club career ==
He made his professional debut in the Russian Second Division in 1993 for FC Zenit-2 St. Petersburg.

== Honours ==
- Russian Premier League bronze: 2001.
- Russian Cup winner: 1999.
- Russian Cup finalist: 2002.

== European club competitions ==
With FC Zenit St. Petersburg.

- UEFA Cup 1999–2000: 2 games.
- UEFA Intertoto Cup 2000: 7 games.
- UEFA Cup 2002–03: 2 games.
