= Igor Nedorezov =

Russian footballer (born 1981)

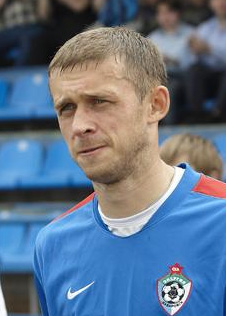

Personal information
- Full name: Igor Olegovich Nedorezov
- Date of birth: 27 June 1981 (age 45)
- Place of birth: Pskov, Russian SFSR
- Height: 1.89 m (6 ft 2 1/2 in)
- Position: Defender

Youth career
- FC Pskov

Senior career*
Years	Team	Apps	(Gls)
1997	FC Mashinostroitel Pskov	13	(0)
1999–2000	FC Pskov	9	(0)
2000–2003	FC Zenit St. Petersburg	17	(0)
2004	FC Luch-Energiya Vladivostok	4	(0)
2005	FC Metallurg Lipetsk	16	(0)
2005–2008	FC Metallurg-Kuzbass Novokuznetsk	114	(2)
2009	FC Volgar-Gazprom Astrakhan	29	(0)
2010–2011	FC SKA-Energiya Khabarovsk	25	(0)
2011–2015	FC Novokuznetsk	76	(2)
2016–2018	FC Pskov-747	45	(2)
- * Club domestic league appearances and goals

Igor Olegovich Nedorezov (Russian: Игорь Олегович Недорезов; born 27 June 1981) is a Russian former professional footballer.

== Club career ==
He made his debut in the Russian Premier League in 2000 for FC Zenit St. Petersburg, and played seven games for them in the 2000 UEFA Intertoto Cup.

== Honours ==
- Russian Premier League runner-up: 2003.
- Russian Premier League bronze: 2001.
