= Boris Gorovoy =

Belarusian footballer and referee

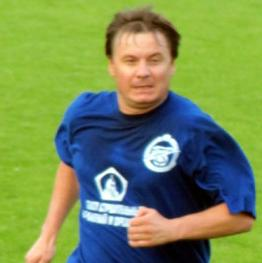

Personal information
- Full name: Boris Olegovich Gorovoy
- Date of birth: 8 April 1974 (age 52)
- Place of birth: Taganrog, RSFSR, Soviet Union
- Height: 1.75 m (5 ft 9 in)
- Positions: Midfielder; forward

Youth career
- Torpedo Taganrog

Senior career*
Years	Team	Apps	(Gls)
1991–1995	Torpedo Taganrog	107	(5)
1992	→ Vedrich Rechitsa (loan)	9	(0)
1995–1997	MPKC Mozyr	60	(5)
1998	Torpedo Minsk	28	(1)
1999–2002	Zenit St. Petersburg	64	(1)
2003	Torpedo-Metallurg Moscow	4	(0)
2003	Volgar-Gazprom Astrakhan	10	(0)
2004	Metalurh Zaporizhya	11	(0)

International career
1995	Belarus U21	1	(0)
1998–2000	Belarus	3	(0)

Managerial career
- 2011–2012: Taganrog (assistant)
- 2012–2015: Taganrog (general director)
- 2022: Dynamo St. Petersburg (assistant)
- 2022: Dynamo St. Petersburg
- 2022–2023: Dynamo St. Petersburg (assistant)
- * Club domestic league appearances and goals

Boris Olegovich Gorovoy (Belarusian: Барыс Алегавіч Гаравы; Russian: Борис Олегович Горовой; born 8 April 1974) is a Belarusian professional football coach and a former player.

== Club career ==
He made his professional debut in the Soviet Second League in 1991 for FC Torpedo Taganrog.

== Referee career ==
Between 2006 and 2009 he worked as a referee in Russian Second Division.

== Honours ==
MPKC Mozyr

- Belarusian Premier League champion: 1996
- Belarusian Cup winner: 1995–96

Zenit Saint Petersburg

- Russian Cup winner: 1998–99

== European club competitions ==
With FC Zenit St. Petersburg.

- UEFA Intertoto Cup 2000: 7 games.
- UEFA Cup 2002–03: 4 games.
