= Konstantin Konoplyov =

Russian footballer

Personal information
- Full name: Konstantin Anatolyevich Konoplyov
- Date of birth: 13 May 1980 (age 46)
- Place of birth: Leningrad, Russia, Soviet Union
- Height: 1.85 m (6 ft 1 in)
- Position: Midfielder

Senior career*
Years	Team	Apps	(Gls)
1998–2004	FC Zenit St. Petersburg	46	(2)
2004	FC Torpedo Moscow	4	(0)
2005	FC Oryol	8	(0)
2005	FC Petrotrest St. Petersburg	11	(1)
2006	FC Volgar-Gazprom Astrakhan	17	(0)
2007	FC Tekstilshchik-Telekom Ivanovo	3	(0)
2008	FC Svarog-SMU303 St. Petersburg		
2009	FC Dynamo St. Petersburg	11	(0)

Managerial career
- 2022–2024: Zenit Saint Petersburg (U21)
- 2025–2026: Zenit-2 Saint Petersburg
- * Club domestic league appearances and goals

Konstantin Anatolyevich Konoplyov (Russian: Константин Анатольевич Коноплёв; born 13 May 1980) is a Russian professional football coach and a former player.

== Club career ==
He made his debut in the Russian Premier League in 2001 for FC Zenit St. Petersburg. He played one game for FC Zenit St. Petersburg in the UEFA Cup 2002–03.

== Honours ==
- Russian Premier League runner-up: 2003.
- Russian Premier League bronze: 2001.
- Russian Cup finalist: 2002.
