= Dzmitry Aharodnik =

Belarusian professional footballer (born 1978)

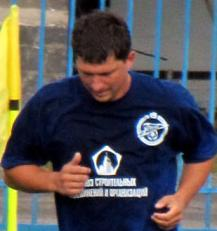

Personal information
- Full name: Dzmitry Barysavich Aharodnik
- Date of birth: 11 June 1978 (age 48)
- Place of birth: Zelva, Byelorussian SSR, Soviet Union (now Belarus)
- Height: 1.86 m (6 ft 1 in)
- Position: Forward

Senior career*
Years	Team	Apps	(Gls)
1994–1995	KPF Slonim	13	(5)
1995–2000	Dnepr-Transmash Mogilev	131	(49)
2000–2002	Zenit St. Petersburg	11	(2)
2003	Metallurg Lipetsk	19	(0)
2003	Dynamo-SPb St. Petersburg	7	(1)
2004	Neman Grodno	13	(2)
2004	Gazovik-Gazprom Izhevsk	19	(2)
2005–2006	Dnepr Mogilev	29	(6)
2007	Veras Nesvizh	16	(2)
2008	Neman Grodno	9	(0)

International career
1998–1999	Belarus U21	9	(1)
2000	Belarus	1	(0)
- * Club domestic league appearances and goals

Dzmitry Barysavich Aharodnik (Belarusian: Дзьмітры Барысавіч Агароднік; Russian: Дмитрий Борисович Огородник; born 11 June 1978 in Zelva) is a retired Belarusian professional footballer. He made his professional debut in the Belarusian Premier League in 1995 for FC Dnepr Mogilev. He played 1 game in the 2002–03 UEFA Cup for FC Zenit St. Petersburg.

== Career ==
Throughout his career, Aharodnik suffered many injuries.

== Honours ==
Dnepr-Transmash Mogilev

- Belarusian Premier League champion: 1998.
