= Konstantin Lepyokhin =

Russian footballer, coach, and club administrator

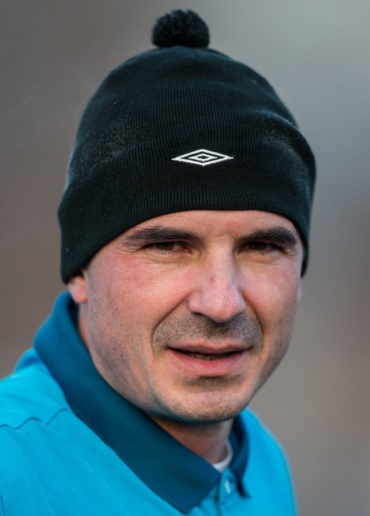
- Konstantin Lepyokhin in 2014

Personal information
- Full name: Konstantin Petrovich Lepyokhin
- Date of birth: 2 October 1975 (age 51)
- Place of birth: Kozlovka, Russian SFSR
- Height: 1.81 m (5 ft 11 1/2 in)
- Positions: Defender; midfielder

Team information
- Current team: FC Druzhba Maykop (administrator)

Youth career
- DYuSSh Maykop

Senior career*
Years	Team	Apps	(Gls)
1993–1996	FC Druzhba Maykop	85	(5)
1995	FC Druzhba-d Maykop	1	(2)
1996–2002	FC Zenit St. Petersburg	134	(7)
1997	FC Zenit-d St. Petersburg	4	(0)
1998	FC Zenit-2 St. Petersburg	15	(2)
2003	FC Dynamo-SPb St. Petersburg	28	(0)
2004	FC Kuban Krasnodar	0	(0)

International career
1995	Russia U-21	4	(0)
1995	Russia U-20	4	(0)

Managerial career
- 2006: FC Zimbru Chișinău (scout)
- 2007–2010: FC Druzhba Maykop (assistant)
- 2010: FC Druzhba Maykop
- 2010–2012: FC Druzhba Maykop (assistant)
- 2012: FC Rus-M St. Petersburg
- 2017–2018: FC Dynamo Bryansk (director)
- 2018–: FC Druzhba Maykop (administrator)
- * Club domestic league appearances and goals

Konstantin Petrovich Lepyokhin (Russian: Константин Петрович Лепёхин; born 2 October 1975) is a Russian professional football coach and a former player. He works as an administrator with FC Druzhba Maykop.

== Club career ==
He made his professional debut in the Russian First Division in 1993 for FC Druzhba Maykop.

He played for the main squad of FC Kuban Krasnodar in the Russian Cup.

== Honours ==
- Russian Premier League bronze: 2001.
- Russian Cup winner: 1999.
- Russian Cup finalist: 2002.

== European club competitions ==
With FC Zenit St. Petersburg.

- UEFA Cup 1999–2000: 1 game.
- UEFA Intertoto Cup 2000: 3 games.
- UEFA Cup 2002–03: 2 games.
