= Russian Premier League Cup =

Football competition in Russia

The Russian Premier League Cup was a football competition organized by the Russian Premier League. It was a knockout competition for all 16 teams of the Premier League. All ties, including the final, were two-legged. The winners of the Cup did not get any special bonuses (such as participation in the UEFA Cup), and the matches were played on the days reserved for national team fixtures. These two factors prevented most clubs from fielding their strongest teams, and matches were played by mixed or reserve teams. Consequently, the competition did not gain much popularity. FC Zenit Saint Petersburg won the only tournament. The league voted in January 2004 to discontinue the cup.

At the semi final stage, FC Zenit Saint Petersburg beat FC Torpedo Moscow, while FC Chernomorets Novorossiysk prevailed over FC Shinnik Yaroslavl. The first leg of the final was played on 9 September at the Petrovsky Stadium in Saint Petersburg. Despite goalkeeper Sergey Ivanov being sent off in the 14th minute, reserve goalkeeper Kamil Čontofalský not only managed to keep a clean sheet, but Zenit managed to score three times while being a player down. The return fixture a month later finished 2–2, for Zenit to win 5–2 on aggregate.

== Final ==
Year	Winner	Score	Runner-up
2003	FC Zenit Saint Petersburg	5–2 (1st leg 3–0) (2nd leg 2–2)	FC Chernomorets Novorossiysk
