= 2014–15 FC Zenit Saint Petersburg season =

Zenit Saint Petersburg
2014–15 season
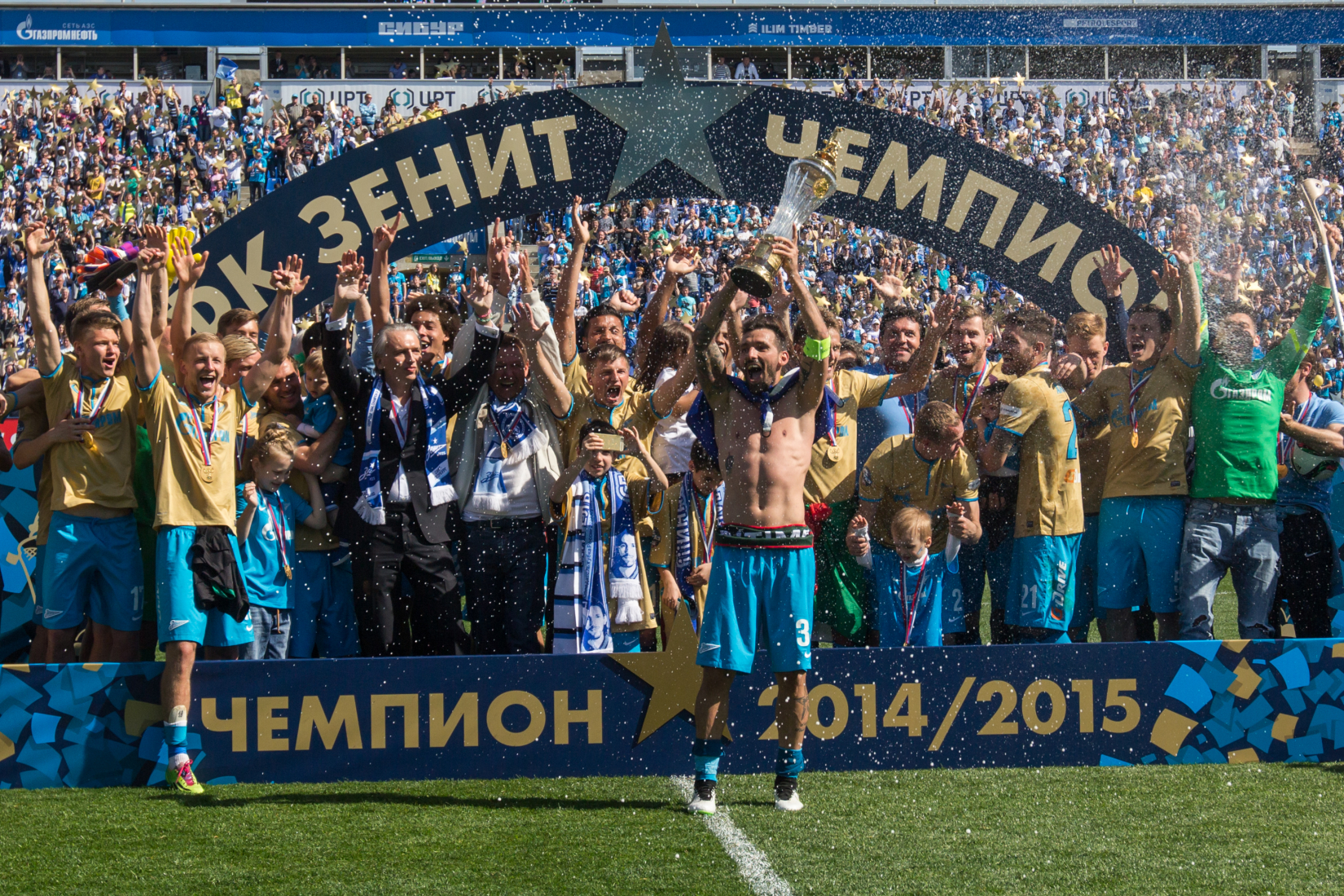
- Zenit win the league, 30 May 2015
- Chairman: Aleksandr Dyukov
- Manager: André Villas-Boas
- Stadium: Petrovsky Stadium
- Russian Premier League: 1st (champions)
- Russian Cup: Last 16 vs Arsenal Tula
- UEFA Champions League: Group stage (3rd)
- UEFA Europa League: Quarter-finals vs Sevilla
- Top goalscorer: League: Hulk (15); All: Hulk (21)
Home colours	Away colours

The 2014–15 Zenit Saint Petersburg season was the 19th successive season that the club participated in the Russian Premier League, the highest tier of football in Russia. During the season, they participated in the Russian Premier League, the Russian Cup, the 2014–15 UEFA Champions League and the 2014–15 UEFA Europa League.

== Squad ==
Note: Flags indicate national team as defined under FIFA eligibility rules; some limited exceptions apply. Players may hold more than one non-FIFA nationality.

No.	Pos.	Nation	Player
1	GK	RUS	Yury Lodygin
2	DF	RUS	Aleksandr Anyukov (2nd vice-captain)
4	DF	ITA	Domenico Criscito
5	MF	RUS	Aleksandr Ryazantsev
6	DF	BEL	Nicolas Lombaerts (1st vice-captain)
7	FW	BRA	Hulk
8	MF	RUS	Pavel Mogilevets
10	FW	RUS	Andrey Arshavin
11	FW	RUS	Aleksandr Kerzhakov
13	DF	POR	Luís Neto
16	GK	RUS	Vyacheslav Malafeev
17	MF	RUS	Oleg Shatov

No.	Pos.	Nation	Player
19	DF	RUS	Igor Smolnikov
20	MF	RUS	Viktor Fayzulin
21	MF	ESP	Javi García
23	FW	VEN	Salomón Rondón
24	DF	ARG	Ezequiel Garay
28	MF	BEL	Axel Witsel
33	DF	SRB	Milan Rodić
35	MF	POR	Danny (captain)
44	MF	UKR	Anatoliy Tymoshchuk
57	DF	RUS	Dzhamaldin Khodzhaniyazov
71	GK	RUS	Yegor Baburin
99	MF	RUS	Ivan Solovyov

=== On loan ===
Note: Flags indicate national team as defined under FIFA eligibility rules; some limited exceptions apply. Players may hold more than one non-FIFA nationality.

No.	Pos.	Nation	Player
58	DF	RUS	Denis Terentyev (ar Tom Tomsk until 30 June 2015)
77	FW	MNE	Luka Đorđević (at Sampdoria until 30 June 2015)

No.	Pos.	Nation	Player
—	DF	ARG	Cristian Ansaldi (at Atlético Madrid until 30 June 2015)

=== Youth team squad ===
Note: Flags indicate national team as defined under FIFA eligibility rules; some limited exceptions apply. Players may hold more than one non-FIFA nationality.

No.	Pos.	Nation	Player
34	FW	RUS	Maximilian Pronichev
37	FW	RUS	Artyom Ponikarov
39	DF	RUS	Dmitri Skopintsev
41	DF	RUS	Andrei Yakovlev
42	MF	RUS	Danila Davidenko
43	FW	RUS	Pavel Nazimov
45	DF	RUS	Artyom Vodyannikov
46	MF	RUS	Zakhar Dilanyan
47	MF	RUS	Valeri Yaroshenko
48	FW	RUS	Aleksei Gasilin
50	DF	RUS	Maksim Karpov
51	GK	RUS	Maksim Rudakov
52	DF	RUS	Andrei Ivanov
53	DF	RUS	Ivan Ivanidi
54	MF	RUS	Daniil Zuyev
55	DF	RUS	Konstantin Lobov
56	DF	RUS	Kirill Kostin
58	DF	RUS	Ilya Zuyev
59	FW	RUS	Aleksei Yegorov
60	MF	RUS	Yevgeni Serenkov
61	GK	RUS	Anton Tsvetkov
62	DF	RUS	Stepan Rebenko

No.	Pos.	Nation	Player
64	DF	RUS	Nikita Novopashin
65	MF	RUS	Danila Yashchuk
67	MF	RUS	Nikita Andreyev
68	MF	RUS	Vyacheslav Zinkov
70	FW	RUS	Dmitri Bogayev
72	DF	RUS	Stepan Zhalobkov
73	MF	RUS	Pavel Osipov
76	FW	RUS	Pavel Kireyenko
78	DF	RUS	Dmitri Chistyakov
79	MF	RUS	Konstantin Troyanov
80	GK	RUS	Mikhail Mzhelsky
82	FW	RUS	Aleksei Makarov
83	GK	RUS	Igor Obukhov
88	MF	RUS	Artyom Popov
90	MF	RUS	Ramil Sheydayev
92	FW	RUS	Pavel Dolgov
94	MF	RUS	Aleksei Yevseyev
95	GK	RUS	Aleksandr Vasyutin
96	DF	RUS	Ilya Kubyshkin
97	MF	RUS	Dmitri Khodakovskiy
98	FW	RUS	Yevgeni Kozlov

== Transfers ==
=== Summer ===
In: Note: Flags indicate national team as defined under FIFA eligibility rules; some limited exceptions apply. Players may hold more than one non-FIFA nationality.

No.	Pos.	Nation	Player
21	MF	ESP	Javi García (from (England) Manchester City)
24	DF	ARG	Ezequiel Garay (from (Portugal) Benfica)
33	DF	SRB	Milan Rodić (end of loan to (Russia) Volga Nizhny Novgorod)
49	DF	RUS	Denis Terentyev (end of loan to (Russia) Tom Tomsk)
57	DF	RUS	Dzhamaldin Khodzhaniyazov (end of loan to (Russia) Amkar Perm)
67	MF	RUS	Nikita Andreyev
77	FW	MNE	Luka Đorđević (end of loan to (Netherlands) Twente)
99	MF	RUS	Ivan Solovyov (end of loan to (Russia) Amkar Perm)
—	FW	RUS	Maximilian Pronichev (from (Germany) Hertha BSC)
—	FW	USA	Eugene Starikov (end of loan to (Russia) Tom Tomsk)

Out: Note: Flags indicate national team as defined under FIFA eligibility rules; some limited exceptions apply. Players may hold more than one non-FIFA nationality.

No.	Pos.	Nation	Player
3	DF	ARG	Cristian Ansaldi (on loan to (Spain) Atlético Madrid)
14	DF	SVK	Tomáš Hubočan (to (Russia) Dynamo Moscow)
18	MF	RUS	Konstantin Zyryanov (to (Russia) Zenit-2 St. Petersburg)
24	DF	SRB	Aleksandar Luković (released)
74	MF	LTU	Ovidijus Verbickas (to (Lithuania) Atlantas)
77	FW	MNE	Luka Đorđević (loan to (Italy) Sampdoria)
86	DF	RUS	Yevgeni Alfyorov (on loan to (Russia) Arsenal Tula)
—	MF	RUS	Roman Shirokov (to (Russia) Spartak Moscow, previously on loan to (Russia) Krasnodar)
—	MF	RUS	Vladimir Bystrov (to (Russia) Krasnodar, previously on loan to (Russia) Anzhi Makhachkala)
—	FW	RUS	Aleksandr Bukharov (to (Russia) Rostov, previously on loan to (Russia) Anzhi Makhachkala)

=== Winter ===
In: Note: Flags indicate national team as defined under FIFA eligibility rules; some limited exceptions apply. Players may hold more than one non-FIFA nationality.

No.	Pos.	Nation	Player

Out: Note: Flags indicate national team as defined under FIFA eligibility rules; some limited exceptions apply. Players may hold more than one non-FIFA nationality.

No.	Pos.	Nation	Player
49	DF	RUS	Denis Terentyev (on loan to (Russia) Tom Tomsk)
63	DF	RUS	Daniil Maykov
75	MF	ARM	Artyom Simonyan (to (Switzerland) Zürich)

== Competitions ==
=== Russian Premier League ===
==== League table ====
Pos	Team	Pld	W	D	L	GF	GA	GD	Pts	Qualification or relegation
1	Zenit St. Petersburg (C)	30	20	7	3	58	17	+41	67	Qualification for the Champions League group stage
2	CSKA Moscow	30	19	3	8	67	27	+40	60	Qualification for the Champions League third qualifying round
3	Krasnodar	30	17	9	4	52	27	+25	60	Qualification for the Europa League third qualifying round
4	Dynamo Moscow	30	14	8	8	53	36	+17	50	
5	Rubin Kazan	30	13	9	8	39	33	+6	48	Qualification for the Europa League third qualifying round

Source: Russian Premier League
Rules for classification: 1) points; 2) number of matches won; 3) head-to-head points; 4) head-to-head wins; 5) head-to-head goal difference; 6) head-to-head goals; 7) number of head-to-head away goals; 8) goal difference; 9) number of goals scored; 10) number of away goals scored
(C) Champions

==== Results by round ====
Round	1	2	3	4	5	6	7	8	9	10	11	12	13	14	15	16	17	18	19	20	21	22	23	24	25	26	27	28	29	30
Ground	A	H	A	H	H	A	H	A	H	A	H	A	H	H	A	A	H	H	A	A	H	A	H	A	H	A	H	A	A	H
Result	W	W	W	W	W	W	W	W	D	D	W	W	L	W	L	W	W	W	D	W	W	W	D	D	W	D	W	D	L	W
Position	2	1	1	1	1	1	1	1	1	1	1	1	1	1	1	1	1	1	1	1	1	1	1	1	1	1	1	1	1	1

Updated to match(es) played on 27 May 2015. Source: Russian Premier League
A = Away; H = Home; W = Win; D = Draw; L = Loss

==== Matches ====
2 August 2014 1	Arsenal Tula	0–4	Zenit Saint Petersburg	Tula
19:00 MSK (UTC+04:00)	Kascelan (yellow card) 49'	Summary	Criscito 9', 69'; Rondón 18'; Hulk 36'; Fayzulin (yellow card) 53'; Neto (yellow card) 90+1'	Stadium: Arsenal Stadium; Attendance: 19,000; Referee: Alexy Nikolaev

9 August 2014 2	Zenit Saint Petersburg	8–1	Torpedo Moscow	Saint Petersburg
17:00 MSK (UTC+04:00)	Smolnikov 26'; Rondón 33', 47'; Hulk (yellow card) 19', (goal) 36' (pen.), 54'; Lombaerts (yellow card) 41'; Shatov 62'; Kerzhakov 72' (pen.), 78'	Summary	Kodoszka (yellow card) 36'; Salugin (yellow card) 82'; Aydov (yellow card) 70', (goal) 86' (pen.)	Stadium: Petrovsky Stadium; Attendance: 9,000; Referee: Igor Nizovtsev

13 August 2014 3	Ural	1–2	Zenit Saint Petersburg	Yekaterinburg
17:30 MSK (UTC+04:00)	Acevedo 36'; Erokhin (yellow card) 90'; Sapeta (yellow card) 90+1'	Summary	Danny 5'; Criscito (yellow card) 50'; Rondón 74'	Stadium: Central Stadium; Attendance: 19,500; Referee: Mikhail Vilkov

16 August 2014 4	Zenit Saint Petersburg	1–0	Ufa	Saint Petersburg
20:00 MSK (UTC+04:00)	Hulk 31' (pen.)	Summary		Stadium: Petrovsky Stadium; Referee: Vitali Meshkov

23 August 2014 5	Zenit Saint Petersburg	2–0	Amkar Perm	Saint Petersburg
17:00 MSK (UTC+04:00)	Shatov 13'; Hulk 22'	Report		Stadium: Petrovsky Stadium; Attendance: 13,063; Referee: Alexey Nikolaev

31 August 2014 6	Lokomotiv Moscow	0–1	Zenit Saint Petersburg	Moscow
18:00 MSK (UTC+04:00)		Summary	García 60'	Stadium: Lokomotiv Stadium; Attendance: 14,747; Referee: Aleksandr Egorov

13 September 2014 7	Zenit Saint Petersburg	3–2	Dynamo Moscow	Saint Petersburg
18:30 MSK (UTC+04:00)	Douglas 28' (o.g.); Arshavin 40'; Criscito (yellow card) 48'; Danny (yellow card) 81'; Smolnikov 89'	Summary	Douglas (yellow card) 6'; Valbuena 18'; Vainqueur (yellow card) 6'; Samba 82'	Stadium: Petrovsky Stadium; Attendance: 14,012; Referee: Mikhail Vilkov

20 September 2014 8	Rostov	0–5	Zenit Saint Petersburg	Rostov-on-Don
14:30MSK (UTC+04:00)	Kanga (yellow card) 30'; Dyakov (yellow card) 62'	Summary	Rondón 11', 57', 73'; Danny (yellow card) 22'; García (yellow card) 26'; Xulu 37' (o.g.); Dyakov 72' (o.g.)	Stadium: Olimp-2; Attendance: 14,253; Referee: Igor Fedotov

27 September 2014 9	Zenit Saint Petersburg	0 – 0	Spartak Moscow	Saint Petersburg
18:30 MSK (UTC+04:00)	Rondón (yellow card) 42'; Fayzulin (yellow card) 72'; Criscito (yellow card) 85'	Summary	Dzyuba (yellow card) 42'; Makeyev (yellow card) 70'; Källström (yellow card) 87'	Stadium: Petrovsky Stadium; Attendance: 19,000; Referee: Igor Nizovtsev

18 October 20104 10	Krasnodar	2 – 2	Zenit Saint Petersburg	Krasnodar
17:00 MSK (UTC+04:00)	Sigurðsson 7'; Mamayev 21'; Granqvist (yellow card) 29'; Kaleshin (yellow card) 55'	Summary	García 38', (yellow card) 58'; Hulk 60'; Garay (red card) 68'	Stadium: Kuban Stadium; Attendance: 9,650; Referee: Timur Arslanbekov

26 October 2014 11	Zenit Saint Petersburg	5 – 0	Mordovia Saransk	Saint Petersburg
19:00 MSK (UTC+3)	Hulk 50'; Kerzhakov 55'; Nakhushev 62' (o.g.); Witsel 67'; Danny 70'; Anyukov (yellow card) 85'	Summary	Le Tallec (yellow card) 47'; Vasin (yellow card) 79'; Shitov (yellow card) 81'; Lutsenko (yellow card) 82'	Stadium: Petrovsky Stadium; Attendance: 17,300; Referee: Aleksei Nikolaev

1 November 2014 12	CSKA Moscow	0 – 1	Zenit Saint Petersburg	Khimki
16:00 MSK (UTC+3)	Wernbloom (yellow card) 23'; Schennikov (yellow card) 86'	Summary	García 7'; Witsel (yellow card) 44'; Criscito (yellow card) 57'; Kerzhakov (yellow card) 72'	Stadium: Arena Khimki; Attendance: 13,500; Referee: Aleksandr Egorov

8 November 2014 13	Zenit Saint Petersburg	1 – 3	Terek Grozny	Saint Petersburg
19:00 MSK (UTC+3)	Ryazantsev 63'	Summary	Aílton 17', 55'; Lebedenko 61'	Stadium: Petrovsky Stadium; Attendance: 15,244; Referee: Vitali Meshkov

22 November 2014 14	Zenit Saint Petersburg	1 – 0	Kuban Krasnodar	Saint Petersburg
19:00 MSK (UTC+3)	Criscito (yellow card) 8'; Hulk 37'	Summary	Kaboré (yellow card) 26'; Kulik (yellow card) 66'	Stadium: Petrovsky Stadium; Attendance: 16,492; Referee: Aleksey Eskov

29 November 2014 15	Mordovia Saransk	1 – 0	Zenit Saint Petersburg	Saransk
18:00 MSK (UTC+3)	Vlasov 29'; Dudiyev (yellow card) 45'	Summary	Smolnikov (yellow card) 28'; Fayzulin (yellow card) 65'; Hulk (yellow card) 70'	Stadium: Start Stadium; Attendance: 6,700; Referee: Aleksei Matyunin

3 December 2014 16	Rubin Kazan	0 – 1	Zenit Saint Petersburg	Kazan
17:45 MSK (UTC+3)	Karadeniz (yellow card) 30'; Georgiev (yellow card) 48'; Portnyagin (yellow card) 78'	Summary	Criscito (yellow card) 51'; Witsel (yellow card) 55', (goal) 68'; Tymoshchuk (yellow card) 81'	Stadium: Kazan Arena; Attendance: 14,340; Referee: Sergey Karasev

6 December 2014 17	Zenit Saint Petersburg	4 – 0	Krasnodar	Saint Petersburg
16:45 MSK (UTC+3)	Garay 12'; Witsel 55'; Danny 61' (yellow card) 81'; Smolnikov 68'	Summary	Mamayev (yellow card) 42'	Stadium: Petrovsky Stadium; Attendance: 17,666; Referee: Mikhail Vilkov

7 March 2015 18	Zenit Saint Petersburg	3 – 0	Ural	Saint Petersburg
19:00 MSK (UTC+3)	Rondón 45', 70', 78'	Summary	Podberyozkin (yellow card) 6'; Khozin (yellow card) 36'; Smolov (yellow card) 85'	Stadium: Petrovsky Stadium; Attendance: 17,606; Referee: Sergey Karasev

15 March 2015 19	Torpedo Moscow	1 – 1	Zenit Saint Petersburg	Ramensky District
16:30 MSK (UTC+3)	Stevanović (yellow card) 88'; Smárason 90+1'	Summary	Hulk 35'	Stadium: Saturn Stadium; Attendance: 6,358; Referee: Mikhail Vilkov

22 March 2015 20	Dynamo Moscow	0 – 1	Zenit Saint Petersburg	Khimki
MSK (UTC+3)		Summary	Smolnikov 17', (yellow card) 34'; Garay (yellow card) 85'	Stadium: Arena Khimki; Attendance: 12,553; Referee: Vitali Meshkov

5 April 2015 21	Zenit Saint Petersburg	2 – 1	CSKA Moscow	Saint Petersburg
13:30 MSK (UTC+3)	Criscito (yellow card) 45+1'; Hulk 62', 73'	Summary	Wernbloom (yellow card) 70'; Strandberg 81'	Stadium: Petrovsky Stadium; Attendance: 18,261; Referee: Sergey Ivanov

8 April 2015 22	Terek Grozny	1 – 2	Zenit Saint Petersburg	Grozny
17:45 MSK (UTC+3)	Semyonov 17'; Komorowski (yellow card) 17'; Kanu (yellow card) 25'; Adílson (yellow card) 54'; Utsiyev (yellow card) 66'	Summary	Neto (yellow card) 17'; Shatov 30'; Rondón 58', (yellow card) 89'; Witsel (yellow card) 66'; Hulk (yellow card) 66'; Anyukov (yellow card) 83'	Stadium: Akhmat-Arena; Attendance: 21,324; Referee: Aleksey Eskov

12 April 2015 23	Zenit Saint Petersburg	1 – 1	Rubin Kazan'	Saint Petersburg
13:30 MSK (UTC+3)	Hulk 48' (pen.); Rondón (yellow card) 54'; Criscito (yellow card) 55' (yellow-red card) 58'; García (yellow card) 66'; Shatov (yellow card) 84'	Summary	Nabiullin 4'; Kislyak (yellow card) 48'; Navas (yellow card) 54'; Cotugno (yellow card) 55'; Kvirkvelia (yellow card) 61'; Georgiev (yellow card) 84'; Akhmetov (yellow card) 90+3'	Stadium: Petrovsky Stadium; Attendance: 17,581; Referee: Sergey Karasev

19 April 2015 24	Kuban Krasnodar	0 – 0	Zenit Saint Petersburg	Krasnodar
18:30 MSK (UTC+3)	Rabiu (yellow card) 10'; Sosnin (yellow card) 59'	Summary	Neto (yellow card) 30'; Hulk (yellow card) 90+2'	Stadium: Kuban Stadium; Attendance: 9,733; Referee: Aleksandr Egorov

26 April 2015 25	Zenit Saint Petersburg	1 – 0	Arsenal Tula	Saint Petersburg
18:30 MSK (UTC+3)	Witsel 17', (yellow card) 36'	Report	Yershov (yellow card) 27'	Stadium: Petrovsky Stadium; Attendance: 16,789; Referee: Vladimir Moskalyov

2 May 2015 26	Spartak Moscow	1 – 1	Zenit Saint Petersburg	Moscow
13:30 MSK (UTC+3)	Tasci (yellow card) 20'; Rômulo 48'; Ebert (yellow card) 52'	Summary	Criscito (yellow card) 17'; Hulk 90+1'	Stadium: Otkrytie Arena; Attendance: 38,704; Referee: Mikhail Vilkov

10 May 2015 27	Zenit Saint Petersburg	3 – 0	Rostov	Saint Petersburg
18:30 MSK (UTC+3)	Shatov 45'; Hulk 45+3'; Lodygin (yellow card) 62'; Rondón 87', (yellow card) 88'	Summary	Bardachow (yellow card) 9'; Kanga (yellow card) 11'; Kalachev (yellow card) 34'; Dyakov (yellow card) 45+3'; Rebko (yellow card) 88'	Stadium: Petrovsky Stadium; Attendance: 17,831; Referee: Sergey Kulikov

17 May 2015 28	Ufa	1 – 1	Zenit Saint Petersburg	Saint Petersburg
16:00 MSK (UTC+3)	Diego (yellow card) 44'; Verkhovtsov (yellow card) 84'; Handžić (yellow card) 87'	Summary	Hulk 32', (yellow card) 65'; Shatov (yellow card) 39'; Danny (yellow card) 43'	Stadium: Petrovsky Stadium; Attendance: 16,925; Referee: Vladimir Moskalyov

23 May 2015 29	Amkar Perm'	1 – 0	Zenit Saint Petersburg	Perm
13:00 MSK (UTC+3)	Kolomeytsev 38'	Summary	Shatov (yellow card) 70'; Hulk (yellow card) 90+1'	Stadium: Zvezda Stadium; Attendance: 12,800; Referee: Sergey Karasev

29 May 2015 30	Zenit Saint Petersburg	1 – 0	Lokomotiv Moscow	Saint Petersburg
13:30 MSK (UTC+3)	Rondón 61'	[ Summary]		Stadium: Petrovsky Stadium

=== Russian Cup ===
24 September 2014 Round of 32	Anzhi Makhachkala	1 – 2	Zenit Saint Petersburg	Kaspiysk
19:00 MSK (UTC+4)	Boli 22'	Summary	Shatov 30'; Rondón 71'	Stadium: Anzhi-Arena; Attendance: 14,500; Referee: Vladimir Moskalyov

29 October 2014 Round of 16	Zenit Saint Petersburg	2 – 3 (a.e.t.)	Arsenal Tula	Saint Petersburg
19:00 MSK (UTC+3)	Arshavin 20'; Rodić 71'	Summary	Kaleshin 80'; Garay 90' (o.g.); Maloyan 104'	Stadium: Petrovsky Stadium; Attendance: 17,625; Referee: Sergey Kulikov

=== UEFA Champions League ===
==== Third qualifying round ====
30 July 2014 First leg	AEL Limassol (Cyprus)	1–0	(Russia) Zenit Saint Petersburg	Larnaca, Cyprus
21:00 MSK (UTC+4)	Cadú (yellow card) 12'; Zézinho (yellow card) 39'; Gikiewicz 64'; Sielis (yellow card) 67'; Eleftheriou (yellow card) 80'	Report	Criscito (yellow card) 22'; Fayzulin (yellow card) 43'; Witsel (red card) 67'	Stadium: Antonis Papadopoulos Stadium; Attendance: 6,700; Referee: Marijo Strahonja (Croatia)

6 August 2014 Second leg	Zenit Saint Petersburg (Russia)	3–0 (3–1 agg.)	(Cyprus) AEL Limassol	Saint Petersburg, Russia
21:00 MSK (UTC+4)	Smolnikov (yellow card) 9'; Rondón 55'; Danny 88'; Kerzhakov 90' (pen.)	Report	Danielzinho (yellow card) 17' (yellow-red card) 27'; Eleftheriou (yellow card) 89'	Stadium: Petrovsky Stadium; Attendance: 15,417; Referee: Alexandru Tudor (Romania)

==== Play-off round ====
20 August 2014 First leg	Standard Liège (Belgium)	0–1	(Russia) Zenit Saint Petersburg	Liège, Belgium
22:45 MSK (UTC+4)	M'Poku (yellow card) 20'; Van Damme (yellow card) 26'; Faty (yellow card) 88'	Report	Shatov 16'; Danny (yellow card) 46'; Smolnikov (yellow card) 74'	Stadium: Stade Maurice Dufrasne; Attendance: 14,435; Referee: Craig Thomson (Scotland)

26 August 2014 Second leg	Zenit Saint Petersburg (Russia)	3–0 (4–0 agg.)	(Belgium) Standard Liège	Saint Petersburg, Russia
20:00 MSK (UTC+4)	Criscito (yellow card) 14'; Rondón 30'; Fayzulin (yellow card) 31' (yellow-red card) 44'; Hulk 54' (pen.), 58', (yellow card) 83'	Report	De Camargo (yellow card) 12'; Van Damme (yellow card) 53'; Ciman (yellow card) 62'; Faty (red card) 89'	Stadium: Petrovsky Stadium; Attendance: 16,017; Referee: Gianluca Rocchi (Italy)

==== Group stage ====
Pos	Team	Pld	W	D	L	GF	GA	GD	Pts	Qualification	MON	LEV	ZEN	BEN
1	(France) Monaco	6	3	2	1	4	1	+3	11	Advance to knockout phase	—	1–0	2–0	0–0
2	(Germany) Bayer Leverkusen	6	3	1	2	7	4	+3	10	Advance to knockout phase	0–1	—	2–0	3–1
3	(Russia) Zenit Saint Petersburg	6	2	1	3	4	6	−2	7	Transfer to Europa League	0–0	1–2	—	1–0
4	(Portugal) Benfica	6	1	2	3	2	6	−4	5		1–0	0–0	0–2	—

Source: UEFA
Rules for classification: Group stage tiebreakers

16 September 2014 1	Benfica (Portugal)	0–2	(Russia) Zenit Saint Petersburg	Lisbon, Portugal
22:45 MSK (UTC+4)	Artur (red card) 18'; Pereira (yellow card) 60'	Report	Hulk 5'; Witsel 22'; García (yellow card) 65'	Stadium: Estádio da Luz; Attendance: 35,294; Referee: Svein Oddvar Moen (Norway)

1 October 2014 2	Zenit Saint Petersburg (Russia)	0-0	(France) Monaco	Saint Petersburg, Russia
20:00 MSK (UTC+4)		Report	Toulalan (yellow card) 38'; Fabinho (yellow card) 81'; Dirar (yellow card) 83'	Stadium: Petrovsky Stadium; Referee: Mark Clattenburg (England)

22 October 2014 3	Bayer Leverkusen (Germany)	2-0	(Russia) Zenit Saint Petersburg	Leverkusen, Germany
22:45 MSK (UTC+4)	Wendell (yellow card) 57' (yellow-red card) 79'; Donati 58'; Papadopoulos 63'	Report	Fayzulin (yellow card) 7'; García (yellow card) 15'; Hulk (yellow card) 16'; Criscito (yellow card) 90+5'; Rondón (yellow card) 90+5'	Stadium: BayArena; Attendance: 27,254; Referee: (Netherlands) Kuipers

4 November 2014 4	Zenit Saint Petersburg (Russia)	1–2	(Germany) Bayer Leverkusen	Saint Petersburg, Russia
20:00 MSK (UTC+3)	Danny (yellow card) 37'; Garay (yellow card) 67'; Witsel (yellow card) 76'; Shatov (yellow card) 82'; Rondón 89'	Report	Son 68', 73'; Donati (yellow card) 79'; Bellarabi (yellow card) 82'	Stadium: Petrovsky Stadium; Attendance: 17,010; Referee: Alberto Undiano Mallenco (Spain)

26 November 2014 5	Zenit Saint Petersburg (Russia)	1-0	(Portugal) Benfica	Saint Petersburg, Russia
20:00 MSK (UTC+3)	Neto (yellow card) 30'; Hulk (yellow card) 36'; Criscito (yellow card) 44'; Danny 79'	Report	Jardel (yellow card) 11'; Samaris (yellow card) 21'; Luisão (yellow card) 36' (yellow-red card) 90+2'	Stadium: Petrovsky Stadium; Attendance: 14,123; Referee: Nicola Rizzoli (Italy)

9 December 2014 6	Monaco (France)	2-0	(Russia) Zenit Saint Petersburg	Monaco
22:45 MSK (UTC+3)	Raggi (yellow card) 26'; Abdennour 63'; Toulalan (yellow card) 81'; Fabinho 89'	Report	Lombaerts (yellow card) 10'; Fayzulin (yellow card) 62'	Stadium: Stade Louis II; Attendance: 11,319; Referee: Damir Skomina (Slovenia)

=== UEFA Europa League ===
==== Round of 32 ====
19 February 2015 First leg	PSV Eindhoven (Netherlands)	0–1	(Russia) Zenit Saint Petersburg	Eindhoven, Netherlands
21:00 MSK (UTC+3)	Depay (yellow card) 84'	Report	Smolnikov (yellow card) 32'; Hulk 64'; Ryazantsev (yellow card) 83'; Garay (yellow card) 84'; Danny (yellow card) 90'	Stadium: Philips Stadion; Attendance: 21,000; Referee: Paolo Tagliavento (Italy)

26 February 2015 Second leg	Zenit Saint Petersburg (Russia)	3–0 (4–0 agg.)	(Netherlands) PSV Eindhoven	Saint Petersburg, Russia
20:00 MSK (UTC+3)	Rondón 29', 67'; Hulk 48'; Shatov (yellow card) 70'	Report	Brenet (yellow card) 20'; Guardado (yellow card) 36'; Wijnaldum (yellow card) 45+2'	Stadium: Petrovsky Stadium; Referee: Cüneyt Çakır (Turkey)

==== Round of 16 ====
12 March 2015 First leg	Zenit Saint Petersburg (Russia)	2–0	(Italy) Torino	Saint Petersburg, Russia
20:00 MSK (UTC+3)	García (yellow card) 34'; Witsel 38'; Criscito 53'; Smolnikov (yellow card) 64'; Ryazantsev (yellow card) 88'	Report	Benassi (yellow card) 12' (yellow-red card) 27'; Glik (yellow card) 87'; Molinaro (yellow card) 90+4'	Stadium: Petrovsky Stadium; Attendance: 17,271; Referee: Jorge Sousa (Portugal)

19 March 2015 Second leg	Torino (Italy)	1–0 (1–2 agg.)	(Russia) Zenit Saint Petersburg	Turin, Italy
23:05 MSK (UTC+3)	Molinaro (yellow card) 20'; Quagliarella (yellow card) 52'; Gazzi (yellow card) 62'; Glik 90'	Report	Tymoshchuk (yellow card) 37'; Criscito (yellow card) 45'; Neto (yellow card) 48'; Danny (yellow card) 52'; Lodygin (yellow card) 58'; Smolnikov (yellow card) 86'; Hulk (yellow card) 89'	Stadium: Stadio Olimpico; Attendance: Referee: Matej Jug (Slovenia)

==== Quarter-final ====
16 April 2015 First leg	Sevilla (Spain)	2–1	(Russia) Zenit Saint Petersburg	Seville, Spain
22:05 MSK (UTC+3)	Bacca 73', (yellow card) 76'; Suárez 88'	Report	Ryazantsev 29', (yellow card) 82'; García (yellow card) 68'; Garay (yellow card) 81'	Stadium: Ramón Sánchez Pizjuán; Attendance: 35,000; Referee: Bas Nijhuis (Netherlands)

23 April 2015 Second leg	Zenit Saint Petersburg (Russia)	2–2 (3–4 agg.)	(Spain) Sevilla	Saint Petersburg, Russia
22:05 MSK (UTC+3)	Neto (yellow card) 5'; Witsel (yellow card) 40'; Rondón 48'; Hulk 72'; Lodigin (yellow card) 90+5'	Report	Bacca 6' (pen.); Iborra (yellow card) 76'; Banega (yellow card) 83'; Gameiro 85'	Stadium: Petrovsky Stadium; Attendance: 24,000; Referee: Nicola Rizzoli (Italy)

== Squad statistics ==
As of match played 23 May 2015

=== Appearances and goals ===
No.	Pos	Nat	Player	Total		Premier League		Russian Cup		Champions League		Europa League	
No.	Pos	Nat	Player	Apps	Goals	Apps	Goals	Apps	Goals	Apps	Goals	Apps	Goals
1	GK	(Russia) RUS	Yuri Lodigin	44	0	28	0	0	0	10	0	6	0
2	DF	(Russia) RUS	Aleksandr Anyukov	28	0	14+3	0	2	0	5+2	0	2	0
4	DF	(Italy) ITA	Domenico Criscito	39	3	24	2	0+1	0	10	0	4	1
5	MF	(Russia) RUS	Aleksandr Ryazantsev	31	1	12+7	1	0+2	0	2+3	0	1+4	0
6	DF	(Belgium) BEL	Nicolas Lombaerts	36	1	20+3	0	1	0	9	0	2+1	1
7	FW	(Brazil) BRA	Hulk	45	21	27+1	15	1+1	0	10	3	5	3
8	MF	(Russia) RUS	Pavel Mogilevets	14	0	0+9	0	1+1	0	0+1	0	0+2	0
10	FW	(Russia) RUS	Andrey Arshavin	21	2	5+9	1	2	1	0+4	0	0+1	0
11	FW	(Russia) RUS	Aleksandr Kerzhakov	21	4	6+8	3	1	0	3+2	1	0+1	0
13	DF	(Portugal) POR	Luís Neto	29	0	14+5	0	2	0	1+1	0	6	0
16	GK	(Russia) RUS	Vyacheslav Malafeev	3	0	1	0	2	0	0	0	0	0
17	MF	(Russia) RUS	Oleg Shatov	44	6	22+4	4	2	1	7+3	1	6	0
19	DF	(Russia) RUS	Igor Smolnikov	35	4	23	4	0	0	6+1	0	5	0
20	MF	(Russia) RUS	Viktor Fayzulin	22	0	11+2	0	1	0	7+1	0	0	0
21	MF	(Spain) ESP	Javi García	35	3	20+3	3	1	0	6	0	5	0
23	FW	(Venezuela) VEN	Salomón Rondón	43	19	16+9	12	1+1	1	9+1	3	6	3
24	DF	(Argentina) ARG	Ezequiel Garay	42	1	25+1	1	1	0	10	0	5	0
28	MF	(Belgium) BEL	Axel Witsel	41	6	25+2	4	1	0	7	1	6	1
33	DF	(Serbia) SRB	Milan Rodić	4	1	0+1	0	2	1	0	0	1	0
35	MF	(Portugal) POR	Danny	42	5	25+2	3	0	0	10	2	5	0
44	MF	(Ukraine) UKR	Anatoliy Tymoshchuk	21	0	4+7	0	1	0	3+1	0	1+4	0
57	DF	(Russia) RUS	Dzhamaldin Khodzhaniyazov	1	0	0	0	0	0	0	0	0+1	0
90	MF	(Russia) RUS	Ramil Sheydayev	5	0	0+5	0	0	0	0	0	0	0
99	MF	(Russia) RUS	Ivan Solovyov	3	0	0+1	0	0	0	1+1	0	0	0
Players away from the club on loan:
Players who appeared for Zenit St. Petersburg no longer at the club:

=== Goalscorers ===
Place	Position	Nation	Number	Name	Russian Premier League	Russian Cup	UEFA Champions League	UEFA Europa League	Total
1	FW	(Brazil)	7	Hulk	15	0	3	3	21
2	FW	(Venezuela)	23	Salomón Rondón	12	1	3	3	19
3	MF	(Belgium)	28	Axel Witsel	4	0	1	1	6
3	MF	(Russia)	17	Oleg Shatov	4	1	1	0	6
5	MF	(Portugal)	35	Danny	3	0	2	0	5
6	DF	(Russia)	19	Igor Smolnikov	4	0	0	0	4
6	FW	(Russia)	11	Aleksandr Kerzhakov	3	0	1	0	4
6				Own goal	4	0	0	0	4
9	MF	(Spain)	21	Javi García	3	0	0	0	3
9	DF	(Italy)	4	Domenico Criscito	2	0	0	1	3
11	FW	(Russia)	10	Andrey Arshavin	1	1	0	0	2
11	MF	(Russia)	5	Aleksandr Ryazantsev	1	0	0	1	2
13	DF	(Argentina)	24	Ezequiel Garay	1	0	0	0	1
13	DF	(Serbia)	33	Milan Rodić	0	1	0	0	1
				TOTALS	57	4	10	9	80

=== Disciplinary record ===
Number	Nation	Position	Name	Russian Premier League		Russian Cup		UEFA Champions League		UEFA Europa League		Total	
Number	Nation	Position	Name	Yellow card	Red card	Yellow card	Red card	Yellow card	Red card	Yellow card	Red card	Yellow card	Red card
1	(Russia)	GK	Yury Lodygin	2	0	0	0	0	0	2	0	4	0
2	(Russia)	DF	Aleksandr Anyukov	2	0	0	0	0	0	0	0	2	0
4	(Italy)	DF	Domenico Criscito	11	1	0	0	4	0	1	0	16	1
5	(Russia)	DF	Aleksandr Ryazantsev	0	0	0	0	0	0	3	0	3	0
6	(Belgium)	DF	Nicolas Lombaerts	2	0	0	0	1	0	0	0	3	0
7	(Brazil)	FW	Hulk	8	0	0	0	3	0	1	0	12	0
11	(Russia)	FW	Aleksandr Kerzhakov	1	0	0	0	0	0	0	0	1	0
13	(Portugal)	DF	Luís Neto	3	0	2	0	1	0	2	0	8	0
17	(Russia)	MF	Oleg Shatov	3	0	0	0	1	0	1	0	5	0
19	(Russia)	DF	Igor Smolnikov	2	0	0	0	2	0	3	0	7	0
20	(Russia)	MF	Viktor Fayzulin	3	0	0	0	5	1	0	0	8	1
21	(Spain)	MF	Javi García	4	0	0	0	2	0	2	0	8	0
23	(Venezuela)	FW	Salomón Rondón	4	0	0	0	1	0	0	0	5	0
24	(Argentina)	DF	Ezequiel Garay	1	1	0	0	1	0	2	0	4	1
28	(Belgium)	MF	Axel Witsel	5	0	0	0	1	1	1	0	7	1
33	(Serbia)	DF	Milan Rodić	0	0	1	0	0	0	0	0	1	0
35	(Portugal)	MF	Danny	4	0	0	0	2	0	2	0	8	0
44	(Ukraine)	MF	Anatoliy Tymoshchuk	1	0	0	0	0	0	1	0	2	0
			TOTALS	56	2	3	0	24	2	21	0	104	4

== Notes ==
- MSK time changed from UTC+4 to UTC+3 permanently on 26 October 2014.
