= 2013–14 FC Zenit Saint Petersburg season =

Zenit Saint Petersburg
2013–14 season
- Chairman: Aleksandr Dyukov
- Manager: Luciano Spalletti (until 11 March 2014); Sergei Semak (caretaker) (11–20 March 2014); André Villas-Boas (from 20 March 2014)
- Stadium: Petrovsky Stadium
- Russian Premier League: 2nd
- Russian Cup: Round of 32
- Russian Super Cup: Runners-up
- UEFA Champions League: Round of 16
- Top goalscorer: League: Hulk (17); All: Hulk (22)
- Highest home attendance: 20,520 vs Terek Grozny; 14 September 2013
- Lowest home attendance: 15,099 vs Borussia Dortmund; 25 February 2014
- Average home league attendance: 18,756
Home colours	Away colours

The 2013–14 Zenit Saint Petersburg season was the 18th successive season that the club played in the Russian Premier League, the highest tier of football in Russia. They finished as runners-up to CSKA Moscow in the Russian Premier League, lost the 2013 Super Cup 3 – 0 to CSKA Moscow, were knocked out of the Russian Cup by Russian Professional Football League side FC Tyumen, and reached the Last 16 of the UEFA Champions League, losing to Borussia Dortmund.

Zenit started the season under the management of Luciano Spalletti, but Spalletti was sacked on 11 March 2014, being replaced by Sergei Semak, in a caretaker capacity, for nine days before André Villas-Boas was appointed manager on 20 March 2014.

== Squad ==
Note: Flags indicate national team as defined under FIFA eligibility rules; some limited exceptions apply. Players may hold more than one non-FIFA nationality.

No.	Pos.	Nation	Player
1	GK	RUS	Yuri Lodigin
3	DF	ARG	Cristian Ansaldi
4	DF	ITA	Domenico Criscito
6	DF	BEL	Nicolas Lombaerts (vice-captain)
7	FW	BRA	Hulk
9	FW	VEN	Salomón Rondón
10	MF	POR	Danny
11	FW	RUS	Aleksandr Kerzhakov
13	DF	POR	Luís Neto
14	DF	SVK	Tomáš Hubočan
16	GK	RUS	Vyacheslav Malafeev

No.	Pos.	Nation	Player
17	MF	RUS	Oleg Shatov
18	MF	RUS	Konstantin Zyryanov
19	DF	RUS	Igor Smolnikov
20	MF	RUS	Viktor Fayzulin
22	DF	RUS	Aleksandr Anyukov (captain)
23	FW	RUS	Andrey Arshavin
28	MF	BEL	Axel Witsel
31	MF	RUS	Aleksandr Ryazantsev
44	MF	UKR	Anatoliy Tymoshchuk
71	GK	RUS	Yegor Baburin

=== On Loan ===
Note: Flags indicate national team as defined under FIFA eligibility rules; some limited exceptions apply. Players may hold more than one non-FIFA nationality.

No.	Pos.	Nation	Player
9	FW	RUS	Aleksandr Bukharov (loan to Anzhi Makhachkala)
15	MF	RUS	Roman Shirokov (loan to Krasnodar)
21	DF	SRB	Milan Rodić (loan to FC Volga Nizhny Novgorod)
34	MF	RUS	Vladimir Bystrov (loan to Anzhi Makhachkala)
57	DF	RUS	Dzhamaldin Khodzhaniyazov (loan to Amkar Perm)

No.	Pos.	Nation	Player
77	FW	MNE	Luka Đorđević (loan to FC Twente)
85	MF	RUS	Pavel Mogilevets (loan to Rubin Kazan)
99	MF	RUS	Ivan Solovyov (loan to Amkar Perm)
—	DF	RUS	Denis Terentyev (loan to Tom Tomsk)
—	FW	USA	Eugene Starikov (loan to Tom Tomsk)

=== Youth Team squad ===
Note: Flags indicate national team as defined under FIFA eligibility rules; some limited exceptions apply. Players may hold more than one non-FIFA nationality.

No.	Pos.	Nation	Player
40	MF	RUS	Pavel Barbashov
41	DF	RUS	Andrei Yakovlev
42	MF	RUS	Danila Davidenko
43	FW	RUS	Pavel Nazimov
45	DF	RUS	Maksim Petrov
46	MF	ARM	Zakhar Dilanyan
47	MF	RUS	Valeri Yaroshenko
48	FW	RUS	Aleksei Gasilin
49	FW	RUS	Aleksei Gudkov
50	DF	RUS	Maksim Karpov
51	GK	RUS	Maksim Rudakov
52	DF	RUS	Andrei Ivanov
53	MF	RUS	Ivan Ivanidi
54	MF	RUS	Aleksandr Zakarlyuka
55	DF	RUS	Konstantin Lobov
56	DF	RUS	Kirill Kostin
58	DF	RUS	Ilya Zuyev
59	FW	RUS	Aleksei Yegorov
60	MF	RUS	Yevgeni Serenkov
61	GK	RUS	Anton Tsvetkov
62	FW	RUS	Stepan Rebenko
63	FW	RUS	Anton Solovyov
64	MF	RUS	Elvin Badalov
65	MF	RUS	Danila Yashchuk
67	DF	RUS	Dmitri Chertishchev
68	MF	RUS	Vyacheslav Zinkov

No.	Pos.	Nation	Player
69	MF	RUS	Sergei Filatenko
70	FW	RUS	Dmitri Bogayev
72	DF	RUS	Stepan Zhalobkov
73	MF	RUS	Pavel Osipov
74	MF	LTU	Ovidijus Verbickas
75	MF	ARM	Artem Simonyan
76	FW	RUS	Pavel Kireyenko
78	DF	RUS	Dmitri Chistyakov
79	MF	RUS	Konstantin Troyanov
80	GK	RUS	Mikhail Mzhelsky
81	MF	RUS	Maksim Batov
82	FW	RUS	Aleksei Makarov
83	GK	RUS	Igor Obukhov
84	DF	RUS	Mikhail Kovalenko
86	DF	RUS	Yevgeni Alfyorov
87	MF	RUS	Aleksei Kayukov
88	FW	RUS	Artyom Popov
89	FW	RUS	Yevgeni Markov
90	MF	RUS	Ramil Sheydayev
92	FW	RUS	Pavel Dolgov
93	MF	RUS	Aleksei Panfilov
94	MF	RUS	Aleksei Yevseyev
95	GK	RUS	Aleksandr Vasyutin
96	DF	RUS	Ilya Kubyshkin
97	MF	RUS	Dmitri Khodakovskiy
98	FW	RUS	Vladislav Yefimov

== Transfers ==
=== Summer ===
In: Note: Flags indicate national team as defined under FIFA eligibility rules; some limited exceptions apply. Players may hold more than one non-FIFA nationality.

No.	Pos.	Nation	Player
1	GK	RUS	Yuri Lodigin (from (Greece) Skoda Xanthi)
3	DF	ARG	Cristian Ansaldi (from (Russia) Rubin Kazan)
17	MF	RUS	Oleg Shatov (from (Russia) Anzhi Makhachkala)
19	DF	RUS	Igor Smolnikov (from (Russia) Krasnodar)
23	FW	RUS	Andrey Arshavin (from (England) Arsenal)
44	MF	UKR	Anatoliy Tymoshchuk (from (Germany) Bayern Munich)
88	FW	SRB	Danko Lazović (end of loan to (Russia) FC Rostov)
99	MF	RUS	Ivan Solovyov (from (Russia) Dynamo Moscow)
—	DF	RUS	Maksim Batov (end of loan to (Russia) Chernomorets Novorossiysk)
—	DF	RUS	Ilya Zuyev (end of loan to (Russia) Tom Tomsk)
—	MF	RUS	Ilya Sagdatullin (end of loan to (Russia) Volgar Astrakhan)
—	FW	USA	Eugene Starikov (end of loan to (Russia) FC Rostov)

Out: Note: Flags indicate national team as defined under FIFA eligibility rules; some limited exceptions apply. Players may hold more than one non-FIFA nationality.

No.	Pos.	Nation	Player
3	DF	POR	Bruno Alves (to (Turkey) Fenerbahçe)
25	MF	RUS	Sergei Semak (retired)
27	MF	RUS	Igor Denisov (to (Russia) Anzhi Makhachkala)
77	FW	MNE	Luka Đorđević (loan to (Netherlands) FC Twente)
—	GK	RUS	Andrei Zaytsev (released)
—	DF	RUS	Igor Cheminava (to (Russia) Dynamo St. Petersburg)
—	DF	RUS	Dmitri Telegin (to (Russia) Dynamo St. Petersburg)
—	DF	RUS	Denis Terentyev (on loan to (Russia) Tom Tomsk)
—	MF	RUS	Yevgeni Bashkirov (to (Russia) Tom Tomsk, previously on loan)
—	FW	USA	Eugene Starikov (on loan to (Russia) Tom Tomsk, previously on loan to (Russia) FC Rostov)
—	FW	RUS	Ilya Yeronin (released)

=== Winter ===
In: Note: Flags indicate national team as defined under FIFA eligibility rules; some limited exceptions apply. Players may hold more than one non-FIFA nationality.

No.	Pos.	Nation	Player
9	FW	VEN	Salomón Rondón (from (Russia) Rubin Kazan)
31	MF	RUS	Aleksandr Ryazantsev (from (Russia) Rubin Kazan)

Out: Note: Flags indicate national team as defined under FIFA eligibility rules; some limited exceptions apply. Players may hold more than one non-FIFA nationality.

No.	Pos.	Nation	Player
9	FW	RUS	Aleksandr Bukharov (loan to (Russia) Anzhi Makhachkala)
15	MF	RUS	Roman Shirokov (loan to (Russia) Krasnodar)
24	DF	SRB	Aleksandar Luković
30	GK	BLR	Yuri Zhevnov
34	MF	RUS	Vladimir Bystrov (loan to (Russia) Anzhi Makhachkala)
57	DF	RUS	Dzhamaldin Khodzhaniyazov (loan to (Russia) Amkar Perm)
85	MF	RUS	Pavel Mogilevets (loan to (Russia) Rubin Kazan)
99	MF	RUS	Ivan Solovyov (loan to (Russia) Amkar Perm)

== Competitions ==
=== Russian Super Cup ===
13 July 2013	CSKA Moscow	3 – 0	Zenit St. Petersburg	Rostov-on-Don
21:30 MSK (UTC+4)	Honda 15', 83'; Ignashevich 36'; Zuber (yellow card) 51'	Report	Neto (yellow card) 34'; Bukharov (yellow card) 84'	Stadium: Olimp – 2 Attendance: 14,500; Referee: Aleksandr Egorov

=== Russian Premier League ===
==== Results by round ====
Round	1	2	3	4	5	6	7	8	9	10	11	12	13	14	15	16	17	18	19	20	21	22	23	24	25	26	27	28	29	30
Ground	A	A	H	A	H	A	H	H	A	A	H	A	H	A	H	A	H	A	H	H	A	H	A	H	H	A	H	A	H	A
Result	W	L	D	W	W	D	W	W	W	W	W	W	W	W	D	L	L	D	W	D	L	W	W	W	W	W	W	D	L	W
Position	4	9	10	5	4	5	2	2	1	1	1	1	1	1	1	1	1	2	1	2	2	2	2	2	1	1	1	1	2	2

Updated to match(es) played on 13 June 2014. Source: Russian Premier League
A = Away; H = Home; W = Win; D = Draw; L = Loss

==== Matches ====
17 July 2013 1	Krasnodar	1 – 2	Zenit St. Petersburg	Krasnodar
20:00 MSK (UTC+4)	Pereyra 46' (yellow card) 66'	Summary	Fayzulin 23'; Danny 37'; Lombaerts (yellow card) 77'	Stadium: Kuban Stadium; Attendance: 16,500; Referee: Timur Arslanbekov

21 July 2013 2	Rubin Kazan'	2 – 1	Zenit St. Petersburg	Kazan
13:30 MSK (UTC+4)	Gökdeniz 51'; Ansaldi (yellow card) 90+3'; Rondón 90+5'	Summary	Danny 6'; Lombaerts (yellow card) 14'; Fayzulin (yellow card) 75'; Zyryanov (yellow card) 81'	Stadium: Central Stadium; Attendance: 15,142; Referee: Vitali Meshkov

26 July 2013 3	Zenit St. Petersburg	1 – 1	Kuban Krasnodar	Saint Petersburg
20:00 MSK (UTC+4)	Arshavin 65'	Summary	Bucur 79' (yellow card) 31'	Stadium: Petrovsky Stadium; Attendance: 20,500; Referee: Sergey Kuznetsov

3 August 2013 4	Volga Nizhny Novgorod	1 – 3	Zenit St. Petersburg	Nizhny Novgorod
13:30 MSK (UTC+4)	Karyaka 21'; Polczak (yellow card) 51'; Ropotan (yellow card) 63'	Summary	Danny 19', 80', 89'; Hulk (yellow card) 25' (yellow-red card) 26'; Shirokov (yellow card) 26'; Khodzhaniyazov (yellow card) 26'	Stadium: Lokomotiv Stadium; Attendance: 13,500; Referee: Evgeny Turbin

17 August 2013 5	Zenit St. Petersburg	3 – 0	Anzhi Makhachkala	Saint Petersburg
18:15 MSK (UTC+4)	Shirokov 25'; Hulk 43'; Smolnikov (yellow card) 56'; Ansaldi 73'	Summary		Stadium: Petrovsky Stadium; Attendance: 19,150; Referee: Aleksandr Egorov

24 August 2013 6	Dynamo Moscow	1 – 1	Zenit St. Petersburg	Moscow
13:30 MSK (UTC+4)	Yusupov (yellow card) 17'; Wilkshire (yellow card) 55'; Dzsudzsák 64'	Summary	Witsel (yellow card) 63'; Ansaldi (yellow card) 65'; Zyryanov (yellow card) 88'; Kerzhakov 90+3'	Stadium: Arena Khimki; Attendance: 12,737; Referee: Aleksey Eskov

1 September 2013 7	Zenit St. Petersburg	2 – 1	Lokomotiv Moscow	Saint Petersburg
13:30 MSK (UTC+4)	Kerzhakov (yellow card) 7'; Neto (yellow card) 14'; Shirokov 43' (pen.); Zyryanov 86'	Report	Ćorluka (yellow card) 7'; Yanbayev (yellow card) 16'; Diarra (red card) 42'; Boussoufa 70' (pen.)	Stadium: Petrovsky Stadium; Attendance: 19,029; Referee: Sergey Ivanov

14 September 2013 8	Zenit St. Petersburg	2 – 0	Terek Grozny	Saint Petersburg
21:15 MSK (UTC+4)	Kerzhakov 21'; Danny 42'	Summary	Aissati (yellow card) 34'; Ivanov (yellow card) 56'; Kudryashov (yellow card) 63'	Stadium: Petrovsky Stadium; Attendance: 20,520; Referee: Vyacheslav Kharlamov

22 September 2013 9	Rostov	0 – 4	Zenit St. Petersburg	Rostov-on-Don
20:30 MSK (UTC+4)		Summary	Danny 50'; Arshavin 67'; Hulk 77'; Fayzulin 85'	Stadium: Olimp – 2 Attendance: 15,000; Referee: Timur Arslanbekov

25 September 2013 10	Krylia Sovetov	1 – 4	Zenit St. Petersburg	Samara, Russia
19:15 MSK (UTC+4)	Goreux 23'; Tsallagov (yellow card) 31'; Caballero (yellow card) 70'	Summary	Lombaerts (yellow card) 34'; Ansaldi (yellow card) 35'; Hulk 47', 61'; Shatov 51', 79'	Stadium: Metallurg Stadium; Attendance: 15,670; Referee: Alexey Nikolaev

28 September 2013 11	Zenit St. Petersburg	4 – 2	Spartak Moscow	Saint Petersburg
19:30 MSK (UTC+4)	Kerzhakov 20'; Hulk 68'; Shatov 81'; Danny 84'	Summary	Källström 29'; Jurado (yellow card) 39'; Makeyev (yellow card) 54'; Carlos (yellow card) 60'; Movsisyan 70'	Stadium: Petrovsky Stadium; Attendance: 19,877; Referee: Aleksandr Egorov

6 October 2013 12	Tom Tomsk	0 – 3	Zenit St. Petersburg	Tomsk
15:45 MSK (UTC+4)		Summary	Hulk 18'; Danny 41'; Witsel 64'	Stadium: Trud Stadium; Attendance: 9,500; Referee: Alexey Eskov

18 October 2013 13	Zenit St. Petersburg	2 – 0	CSKA Moscow	Saint Petersburg
20:00 MSK (UTC+4)	Shirokov 16'; Hulk 45'	Summary	Vitinho (yellow card) 16'; Wernbloom (yellow card) 45'	Stadium: Petrovsky Stadium; Attendance: 18,899; Referee: Vitali Meshkov

26 October 2013 14	Ural Sverdlovsk Oblast	1 – 2	Zenit St. Petersburg	Yekaterinburg
18:00 MSK (UTC+4)	Solosin (yellow card) 10'; Acevedo (yellow card) 34'; Gogniyev 42'; Lungu (yellow card) 70'	Summary	Neto (yellow card) 32'; Shirokov 54', 79'; Danny (yellow card) 77'	Stadium: Central Stadium; Attendance: 23,150; Referee: Igor Nizovtsev

2 November 2013 15	Zenit St. Petersburg	1 – 1	Amkar Perm	Saint Petersburg
18:30 MSK (UTC+4)	Danny 38'	Summary	Phibel 26'; Witsel (yellow card) 90+5'; Hulk (yellow card) 90+5'	Stadium: Petrovsky Stadium; Attendance: 18,734; Referee: Sergey Karasev

10 November 2013 16	Spartak Moscow	4 – 2	Zenit St. Petersburg	Moscow
13:30 MSK (UTC+4)	Movsisyan (yellow card) 1' (goal) 33', 44', 48'; Costa (yellow card) 18'; McGeady (yellow card) 27'; Parshivlyuk (yellow card) 35'; Glushakov 83'	Summary	Kerzhakov 6'; Hulk 64' (yellow card) 85'; Luís Neto (yellow card) 79'; Anyukov (yellow card) 90+3'	Stadium: Lokomotiv Stadium; Referee: Aleksey Eskov

22 November 2013 17	Zenit St. Petersburg	0 – 2	Rostov	Saint Petersburg
19:00 MSK (UTC+4)	Criscito (yellow card) 19'; Fayzulin (yellow card) 85'	Summary	Dyakov 18'; Kalachev 39'	Stadium: Petrovsky Stadium; Attendance: 17,457; Referee: Alexey Nikolaev

1 December 2013 18	Terek Grozny	1 – 1	Zenit St. Petersburg	Grozny
13:50 MSK (UTC+4)	Lebedenko 51'	Summary	Fayzulin (yellow card) 42'; Smolnikov (yellow card) 67'; Witsel 78'	Stadium: Terek Stadium; Attendance: 20,730; Referee: Sergey Ivanov

6 December 2013 19	Zenit St. Petersburg	2 – 1	Ural Sverdlovsk Oblast	Saint Petersburg
20:00 MSK (UTC+4)	Hulk 12'; Lombaerts 75'	Summary	Gogniyev 55'; Tumasyan (yellow card) 78'	Stadium: Petrovsky Stadium; Attendance: 16,775; Referee: Timur Arslanbekov

9 March 2014 20	Zenit St. Petersburg	0 – 0	Tom Tomsk	Saint Petersburg
18:30 MSK (UTC+4)	Neto (yellow card) 85'; Lodigin (yellow card) 90+1'	Summary		Stadium: Petrovsky Stadium; Attendance: 18,205; Referee: Igor Fedotov

15 March 2014 21	CSKA Moscow	1 – 0	Zenit St. Petersburg	Moscow
16:00 MSK (UTC+4)	Milanov 32'	Summary	Smolnikov (yellow card) 79'; Hubočan (yellow card) 90+3'	Stadium: Arena Khimki; Attendance: 14,200; Referee: Mikhail Vilkov

24 March 2014 22	Zenit St. Petersburg	2 – 1	Krylia Sovetov	Saint Petersburg
19:00 MSK (UTC+4)	Hulk 5' (pen.), 52'; Kerzhakov (yellow card) 11'; Anyukov (yellow card) 20'; Fayzulin (yellow card) 58'; Neto (yellow card) 68'; Ryazantsev (yellow card) 85'	Summary	Taranov (yellow card) 4'; Tsallagov 54'	Stadium: Petrovsky Stadium; Attendance: 18,758; Referee: Sergey Karasev

29 March 2104 23	Amkar Perm	1 – 2	Zenit St.Petersburg	Perm
16:00 MSK (UTC+4)	Kanunnikov 18'	Summary	Criscito 49' (yellow card) 84'; Kerzhakov 54'; Lodigin (yellow card) 90+2'	Stadium: Zvezda Stadium; Attendance: 15,500; Referee: Vitali Meshkov

6 April 2014 24	Zenit St. Petersburg	6 – 2	Rubin Kazan'	Saint Petersburg
13:30 MSK (UTC+4)	Hulk 19' (pen.), 35' (pen.); Rondón 68', 78', 90'; Danny 75'	Summary	Azmoun 64'; Eremenko 82' (pen.)	Stadium: Petrovsky Stadium; Attendance: 17,880; Referee: Timur Arslanbekov

12 April 2013 25	Zenit St. Petersburg	4 – 1	Krasnodar	Saint Petersburg
19:30 MSK (UTC+4)	Hulk 21', 64', 90+3'; Criscito (yellow card) 42'; Neto 56'; Witsel (yellow card) 57'; Rondón 81'	Summary	Kaleshin 19'; Joãozinho 52' (yellow card) 41'; Granqvist 65'	Stadium: Petrovsky Stadium; Attendance: 19,375; Referee: Aleksey Eskov

19 April 2014 26	Anzhi Makhachkala	1 – 2	Zenit St. Petersburg	Kaspiysk
18:00 MSK (UTC+4)	Smolov 29'; Grigalava (yellow card) 31'; Bukharov (yellow card) 39'; Bilyaletdinov (yellow card) 41'; Yeshchenko (yellow card) 89'	Summary	Rondón 9'; Danny 62'; Hulk (yellow card) 72'; Criscito (yellow card) 89'	Stadium: Anzhi-Arena; Attendance: 21,200; Referee: Alexey Nikolaev

26 April 2014 27	Zenit St. Petersburg	2 – 0	Volga Nizhny Novgorod	Saint Petersburg
16:30 MSK (UTC+4)	Witsel 25'; Fayzulin 77'	Summary	Polczak (yellow card) 39'; Leandro (yellow card) 40'; Rodić (yellow card) 60'; Minosyan (yellow card) 70'	Stadium: Petrovsky Stadium; Attendance: 20,027; Referee: Igor Fedotov

4 May 2014 28	Lokomotiv Moscow	1 – 1	Zenit St. Petersburg	Moscow
13:30 MSK (UTC+3)	Tkachyov 76'	Report	Neto (yellow card) 19'; Rondón 35'	Stadium: Lokomotiv Stadium; Attendance: 26,500; Referee: Aleksandr Yegorov (injured; from 67th min. Igor Nizovtsev)

11 May 2014 29	Zenit St. Petersburg	0 – 3^{1}	Dynamo Moscow	Saint Petersburg
13:30 MSK (UTC+4)	Danny 6'; Criscito (yellow card) 67'; Kerzhakov 82'	Summary	Yusupov 35'; Denisov (yellow card) 37'; Fernández 57'; Kurányi 71' (yellow card) 63'; Noboa 65'; Dyadyun (yellow card) 83'	Stadium: Petrovsky Stadium; Attendance: 19,089; Referee: Sergey Ivanov

15 May 2014 30	Kuban Krasnodar	1 – 4	Zenit St. Petersburg	Krasnodar
18:30 MSK (UTC+4)	Kaboré (yellow card) 38'; Melgarejo 68'	Summary	Witsel 15'; Rondón 32'; Smolnikov (yellow card) 38'; Shatov 51'; Criscito (yellow card) 79'; Hulk 90+2' (yellow card) 90+3'	Stadium: Kuban Stadium; Attendance: 22,429; Referee: Mikhail Vilkov

==== League table ====
Pos	Team	Pld	W	D	L	GF	GA	GD	Pts	Qualification or relegation
1	CSKA Moscow (C)	30	20	4	6	49	26	+23	64	Qualification for the Champions League group stage
2	Zenit St. Petersburg	30	19	6	5	63	32	+31	63	Qualification for the Champions League third qualifying round
3	Lokomotiv Moscow	30	17	8	5	51	23	+28	59	Qualification for the Europa League play-off round
4	Dynamo Moscow	30	15	7	8	54	37	+17	52	Qualification for the Europa League third qualifying round
5	Krasnodar	30	15	5	10	46	39	+7	50 (Note: Krasnodar ahead of Spartak Moscow on head-to-head points; Krasnodar–Spartak Moscow 4–0, Spartak Moscow–Krasnodar 3–2.)	Qualification for the Europa League second qualifying round

Source: Russian Premier League
Rules for classification: 1) points; 2) number of wins; 3) head-to-head points; 4) number of head-to-head wins; 5) head-to-head goal difference; 6) number of head-to-head goals scored; 7) number of head-to-head away goals scored; 8) goal difference; 9) number of goals scored; 10) number of away goals scored; 11) position in the 2012–13 season (only used until all the regularly scheduled games have been played); 11) extra play-off game or tournament between the teams in question.
(C) Champions

=== Russian Cup ===
30 October 2013 Round of 32	Tyumen	2–0	Zenit Saint Petersburg	Tyumen
18:00 MSK (UTC+4)	Telenkov (yellow card) 27'; Kanayev 32' (pen.); Baburin 45' (pen.); Serdyukov (yellow card) 61'; Morozov (yellow card) 90'	Summary	Anyukov (yellow card) 31'; Criscito (yellow card) 44'; Bukharov (yellow card) 63'	Stadium: Geolog Stadium; Attendance: 13,000; Referee: Vladimir Seldyakov

=== UEFA Champions League ===
==== Third qualifying round ====
30 July 2013 First leg	Nordsjælland (Denmark)	0–1	(Russia) Zenit Saint Petersburg	Farum, Denmark
21:00 MSK (UTC+04:00)	Mtiliga (yellow card) 58'	Report	Kerzhakov 49'; Neto (yellow card) 64'	Stadium: Farum Park; Attendance: 5,417; Referee: Alon Yefet (Israel)

7 August 2013 Second leg	Zenit Saint Petersburg (Russia)	5–0 (6–0 agg.)	(Denmark) Nordsjælland	Saint Petersburg, Russia
20:00 MSK (UTC+04:00)	Shirokov 26', 90+3'; Hulk 50'; Bukharov (yellow card) 58'; Danny 62'; Arshavin 68'; Neto (red card) 72'	Report	Jakobsen (yellow card) 15'; Hansen (yellow card) 27'; Christiansen (yellow card) 51'	Stadium: Petrovsky Stadium; Attendance: 20,072; Referee: Serge Gumienny (Belgium)

==== Play-off round ====
20 August 2013 First leg	Paços de Ferreira (Portugal)	1–4	(Russia) Zenit Saint Petersburg	Paços de Ferreira, Portugal
22:45 MSK (UTC+04:00)	Anunciação (yellow card) 7'; Leão 58'; Ricardo (yellow card) 84'	Report	Shirokov 27', 60', 90'; Anyukov (yellow card) 74'; Degra 85' (o.g.); Hubočan (yellow card) 90+3'	Stadium: Estádio da Mata Real; Attendance: 4,466; Referee: Martin Atkinson (England)

28 August 2013 Second leg	Zenit Saint Petersburg (Russia)	4–2 (8–3 agg.)	(Portugal) Paços de Ferreira	Saint Petersburg, Russia
20:00 MSK (UTC+04:00)	Neto (yellow card) 28'; Danny 38', 48'; Bukharov 66'; Arshavin 78' (pen.); Zyryanov (yellow card) 86'	Report	Santos (yellow card) 53'; Grégory (yellow card) 58'; Manuel José 67'; Carlos 83'	Stadium: Petrovsky Stadium; Attendance: 19,976; Referee: Alberto Undiano Mallenco (Spain)

==== Group stage ====
Pos	Team	Pld	W	D	L	GF	GA	GD	Pts	Qualification	ATM	ZEN	POR	AWI
1	(Spain) Atlético Madrid	6	5	1	0	15	3	+12	16	Advance to knockout phase	—	3–1	2–0	4–0
2	(Russia) Zenit Saint Petersburg	6	1	3	2	5	9	−4	6	Advance to knockout phase	1–1	—	1–1	0–0
3	(Portugal) Porto	6	1	2	3	4	7	−3	5 (Note: Head-to-head points: Porto 4, Austria Wien 1.)	Transfer to Europa League	1–2	0–1	—	1–1
4	Austria Wien	6	1	2	3	5	10	−5	5		0–3	4–1	0–1	—

Source: UEFA
Notes:

18 September 2013 1	Atlético Madrid (Spain)	3–1	(Russia) Zenit Saint Petersburg	Madrid, Spain
22:45 MSK (UTC+04:00)	Miranda 40'; Godín (yellow card) 45'; Turan 64'; Baptistão 80'	Report	Lombaerts (yellow card) 49'; Hulk 58', (yellow card) 79'; Smolnikov (yellow card) 54'; Hubočan (yellow card) 65'	Stadium: Vicente Calderón Stadium; Attendance: 33,855; Referee: William Collum (Scotland)

1 October 2013 2	Zenit Saint Petersburg (Russia)	0–0	Austria Wien	Saint Petersburg, Russia
20:00 MSK (UTC+04:00)	Smolnikov (yellow card) 4'; Witsel (red card) 44'; Hubočan (yellow card) 72'	Report	Royer (yellow card) 23'; Leovac (yellow card) 70'; Ramsebner (yellow card) 73'; Murg (yellow card) 88'	Stadium: Petrovsky Stadium; Attendance: 18,785; Referee: Deniz Aytekin (Germany)

22 October 2013 3	Porto (Portugal)	0–1	(Russia) Zenit Saint Petersburg	Porto, Portugal
22:45 MSK (UTC+04:00)	Herrera (yellow card) 5' (yellow-red card) 6'; González (yellow card) 72'; Martínez (yellow card) 74'	Report	Fayzulin (yellow card) 36'; Shirokov (yellow card) 42'; Kerzhakov 86'; Neto (yellow card) 90+4'	Stadium: Estádio do Dragão; Attendance: 31,109; Referee: Paolo Tagliavento (Italy)

6 November 2013 4	Zenit Saint Petersburg (Russia)	1–1	(Portugal) Porto	Saint Petersburg, Russia
21:00 MSK (UTC+04:00)	Hulk 28'; Shatov (yellow card) 85'; Zyryanov (yellow card) 89'	Report	González 23'; Fernando (yellow card) 56'; Alex Sandro (yellow card) 61'	Stadium: Petrovsky Stadium; Attendance: 17,786; Referee: Tom Harald Hagen (Norway)

26 November 2013 5	Zenit Saint Petersburg (Russia)	1–1	(Spain) Atlético Madrid	Saint Petersburg, Russia
21:00 MSK (UTC+04:00)	Alderweireld 74' (o.g.)	Report	Juanfran (yellow card) 30'; Adrián 53'; García (yellow card) 84'	Stadium: Petrovsky Stadium; Attendance: 17,885; Referee: Martin Atkinson (England)

11 December 2013 6	Austria Wien	4–1	(Russia) Zenit Saint Petersburg	Vienna, Austria
23:45 MSK (UTC+04:00)	Ortlechner (yellow card) 40'; Hosiner 44', 51'; Jun 48'; Dilaver (yellow card) 73'; Kienast 90+3'	Report	Kerzhakov 35'; Shirokov (yellow card) 45+3'; Hulk (yellow card) 81'	Stadium: Ernst-Happel-Stadion^{2} Attendance: 37,500; Referee: Aleksandar Stavrev (Macedonia)

==== Knockout phase ====
===== Round of 16 =====
25 February 2014 First leg	Zenit Saint Petersburg (Russia)	2–4	(Germany) Borussia Dortmund	Saint Petersburg, Russia
21:00 MSK (UTC+04:00)	Anyukov (yellow card) 54'; Shatov 57'; Hulk 69' (pen.); Fayzulin (yellow card) 81'	Report	Mkhitaryan 4'; Reus 5'; Lewandowski 61', 71'; Piszczek (yellow card) 69'	Stadium: Petrovsky Stadium; Attendance: 15,099; Referee: William Collum (Scotland)

19 March 2014 Second leg	Borussia Dortmund (Germany)	1–2 (5–4 agg.)	(Russia) Zenit Saint Petersburg	Dortmund, Germany
23:45 MSK (UTC+4)	Lewandowski (yellow card) 18'; Kehl 38', (yellow card) 55'; Jojić (yellow card) 75'	Report	Hulk 16'; Lombaerts (yellow card) 23'; Rondón 73'	Stadium: Signal Iduna Park; Attendance: 65,829; Referee: Alberto Undiano Mallenco (Spain)

== Squad statistics ==
=== Appearances and goals ===
No.	Pos	Nat	Player	Total		Premier League		Russian Cup		Champions League		Super Cup	
No.	Pos	Nat	Player	Apps	Goals	Apps	Goals	Apps	Goals	Apps	Goals	Apps	Goals
1	GK	(Russia) RUS	Yuri Lodigin	41	0	29	0	0	0	11	0	1	0
3	DF	(Argentina) ARG	Cristian Ansaldi	12	1	6+2	1	0	0	4	0	0	0
4	DF	(Italy) ITA	Domenico Criscito	26	1	17+1	1	1	0	5+2	0	0	0
6	DF	(Belgium) BEL	Nicolas Lombaerts	39	1	27	1	0	0	12	0	0	0
7	MF	(Brazil) BRA	Hulk	34	22	23+1	17	0	0	10	5	0	0
9	FW	(Venezuela) VEN	Salomón Rondón	13	8	8+2	7	0	0	1+1	1	1	0
10	MF	(Portugal) POR	Danny	36	15	25+1	12	0	0	9	3	1	0
11	FW	(Russia) RUS	Aleksandr Kerzhakov	31	8	11+8	5	0	0	6+5	3	1	0
13	DF	(Portugal) POR	Luís Neto	34	0	22+3	0	1	0	6+1	0	1	0
14	DF	(Slovakia) SVK	Tomáš Hubočan	24	0	15	0	0	0	8	0	1	0
16	GK	(Russia) RUS	Vyacheslav Malafeev	2	0	1	0	0	0	1	0	0	0
17	MF	(Russia) RUS	Oleg Shatov	30	5	11+11	4	1	0	6+1	1	0	0
18	MF	(Russia) RUS	Konstantin Zyryanov	28	1	10+8	1	1	0	5+3	0	1	0
19	DF	(Russia) RUS	Igor Smolnikov	29	0	17+2	0	1	0	6+3	0	0	0
20	MF	(Russia) RUS	Viktor Fayzulin	35	3	20+5	3	0	0	8+1	0	0+1	0
22	DF	(Russia) RUS	Aleksandr Anyukov	22	0	14	0	1	0	6	0	1	0
23	FW	(Russia) RUS	Andrey Arshavin	34	4	15+6	2	1	0	3+8	2	1	0
28	MF	(Belgium) BEL	Axel Witsel	43	4	29+1	4	0+1	0	11	0	1	0
31	MF	(Russia) RUS	Aleksandr Ryazantsev	6	0	2+4	0	0	0	0	0	0	0
44	MF	(Ukraine) UKR	Anatoliy Tymoshchuk	24	0	8+9	0	1	0	2+3	0	1	0
71	GK	(Russia) RUS	Yegor Baburin	1	0	0	0	1	0	0	0	0	0
Players away from the club on loan:
9	FW	(Russia) RUS	Aleksandr Bukharov	8	1	3+1	0	1	0	2	1	0+1	0
15	MF	(Russia) RUS	Roman Shirokov	19	10	10	5	1	0	7+1	5	0	0
34	MF	(Russia) RUS	Vladimir Bystrov	21	0	5+10	0	0	0	1+4	0	0+1	0
57	DF	(Russia) RUS	Dzhamaldin Khodzhaniyazov	3	0	2	0	0	0	1	0	0	0
77	FW	(Montenegro) MNE	Luka Đorđević	1	0	0+1	0	0	0	0	0	0	0
85	MF	(Russia) RUS	Pavel Mogilevets	2	0	0	0	0	0	1+1	0	0	0
99	MF	(Russia) RUS	Ivan Solovyov	1	0	0	0	0+1	0	0	0	0	0
Players who appeared for Zenit St. Petersburg no longer at the club:
24	DF	(Serbia) SRB	Aleksandar Luković	3	0	0+1	0	0	0	0+1	0	1	0

=== Top Scorers ===
Place	Position	Nation	Number	Name	Russian Premier League	Russian Cup	UEFA Champions League	Russian Super Cup	Total
1	FW	(Brazil)	7	Hulk	17	0	5	0	22
2	MF	(Portugal)	10	Danny	12	0	3	0	15
3	MF	(Russia)	15	Roman Shirokov	5	0	5	0	10
4	FW	(Venezuela)	9	Salomón Rondón	7	0	1	0	8
4	FW	(Russia)	11	Aleksandr Kerzhakov	5	0	3	0	8
6	MF	(Russia)	17	Oleg Shatov	4	0	1	0	5
7	MF	(Belgium)	28	Axel Witsel	4	0	0	0	4
7	FW	(Russia)	23	Andrey Arshavin	2	0	2	0	4
9	MF	(Russia)	20	Viktor Fayzulin	3	0	0	0	3
10				Own goal	0	0	2	0	2
11	DF	(Belgium)	6	Nicolas Lombaerts	1	0	0	0	1
11	MF	(Russia)	18	Konstantin Zyryanov	1	0	0	0	1
11	DF	(Argentina)	3	Cristian Ansaldi	1	0	0	0	1
11	DF	(Italy)	4	Domenico Criscito	1	0	0	0	1
11	FW	(Russia)	9	Aleksandr Bukharov	0	0	1	0	1
				TOTALS	63	0	23	0	86

=== Disciplinary record ===
Number	Nation	Position	Name	Russian Premier League		Russian Cup		UEFA Champions League		Russian Super Cup		Total	
Number	Nation	Position	Name	Yellow card	Red card	Yellow card	Red card	Yellow card	Red card	Yellow card	Red card	Yellow card	Red card
1	(Russia)	GK	Yuri Lodigin	2	0	0	0	0	0	0	0	2	0
3	(Argentina)	DF	Cristian Ansaldi	2	0	0	0	0	0	0	0	2	0
4	(Italy)	DF	Domenico Criscito	6	0	0	0	1	0	0	0	7	0
6	(Belgium)	DF	Nicolas Lombaerts	3	0	0	0	2	0	0	0	5	0
7	(Brazil)	FW	Hulk	6	1	0	0	2	0	0	0	8	1
9	(Russia)	FW	Aleksandr Bukharov	0	0	1	0	1	0	1	0	3	0
10	(Portugal)	MF	Danny	1	0	0	0	0	0	0	0	1	0
11	(Russia)	FW	Aleksandr Kerzhakov	2	0	0	0	0	0	0	0	2	0
13	(Portugal)	DF	Luís Neto	7	0	0	0	3	1	1	0	11	1
14	(Slovakia)	DF	Tomáš Hubočan	1	0	0	0	3	0	0	0	4	0
15	(Russia)	MF	Roman Shirokov	1	0	0	0	1	0	0	0	2	0
18	(Russia)	MF	Konstantin Zyryanov	2	0	0	0	3	0	0	0	5	0
17	(Russia)	MF	Oleg Shatov	0	0	0	0	2	0	0	0	2	0
19	(Russia)	DF	Igor Smolnikov	4	0	0	0	2	0	0	0	6	0
20	(Russia)	MF	Viktor Fayzulin	4	0	0	0	2	0	0	0	6	0
22	(Russia)	DF	Aleksandr Anyukov	2	0	1	0	2	0	0	0	5	0
28	(Belgium)	MF	Axel Witsel	3	0	0	0	0	1	0	0	3	1
31	(Russia)	MF	Aleksandr Ryazantsev	1	0	0	0	0	0	0	0	1	0
57	(Russia)	DF	Dzhamaldin Khodzhaniyazov	1	0	0	0	0	0	0	0	1	0
			TOTALS	48	1	3	0	24	2	2	0	77	3

== Notes ==
- Match was interrupted in the 86th minute with Dynamo leading 4-2 when Zenit fans ran out of the stands. At first they stood behind the goal line, when the referee decided to take the teams off the field into the dressing rooms and teams began to leave, one of Zenit fans punched Dynamo player Vladimir Granat, the match was then abandoned.
- Austria Wien played their home matches at Ernst-Happel-Stadion, Vienna instead of their regular stadium, Franz Horr Stadium, Vienna.
