= Domenico Criscito =

Italian footballer (born 1986)

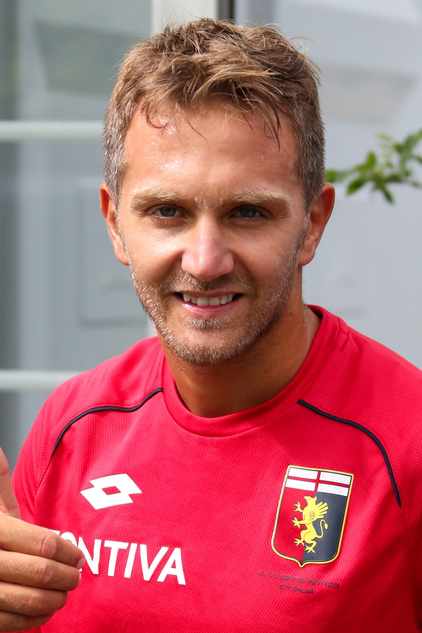
- Criscito with Genoa in 2018

Personal information
- Full name: Domenico Criscito
- Date of birth: 30 December 1986 (age 39)
- Place of birth: Cercola, Italy
- Height: 1.83 m (6 ft 0 in)
- Position: Left-back

Team information
- Current team: Genoa (youth coach)

Youth career
- 1996–2002: Sporting Volla
- 2002–2004: Genoa
- 2004–2006: Juventus

Senior career*
Years	Team	Apps	(Gls)
2003–2004	Genoa	1	(0)
2004–2009	Juventus	8	(0)
2006–2009	→ Genoa (loan)	87	(7)
2009–2011	Genoa	65	(2)
2011–2018	Zenit Saint Petersburg	156	(15)
2018–2022	Genoa	104	(17)
2022	Toronto FC	15	(1)
2023	Genoa	16	(1)
Total		452	(43)

International career
2003	Italy U17	5	(0)
2003–2004	Italy U18	5	(0)
2004–2005	Italy U19	6	(1)
2005–2006	Italy U20	4	(1)
2006–2009	Italy U21	26	(1)
2008	Italy Olympic	4	(0)
2009–2018	Italy	26	(0)
- * Club domestic league appearances and goals

Domenico Criscito (born 30 December 1986) is an Italian former professional footballer who played as a left-back. A versatile player, Criscito was effective both offensively and defensively and was also capable of playing as a wing-back or centre-back, a position which he often occupied in his early career.

Criscito played for Serie A clubs Genoa and Juventus, making over 200 appearances across four spells for the former. He also played for 7 seasons in the Russian Premier League for Zenit Saint Petersburg, making 225 total appearances and winning two league titles. A full international from 2009 to 2018, he played for Italy at the 2010 FIFA World Cup.

== Club career ==
=== Early career ===
A native of southern Italy, Criscito moved up north at age 13 to pursue his football career. He started his professional career at Genoa, for whom he made his debut in Serie B in June 2003 at the age of 16. In the summer of 2004, Genoa sold 50% of Criscito and Francesco Volpe contracts to Juventus for €1.9 million, with 50% contract of Antonio Nocerino was sold to Genoa for €450,000.

=== Juventus ===
Criscito played for Juventus's Primavera team alongside Italy U-21 teammates Claudio Marchisio, Paolo De Ceglie and Sebastian Giovinco, and together they won the 2005–06 Campionato Nazionale Primavera. In the 2006–07 season, he returned to Genoa and established himself as one of the top young defenders in Serie B. In January 2007, Juventus bought its remaining 50% registration rights for €7.5 million. This was paid by the co-ownership of Masiello and Konko to Genoa, and €5.25 million cash. He also signed a new contract with Juventus that would last until 30 June 2011, remaining on loan at Genoa.

Criscito made his Serie A debut for Juventus on 25 August 2007, in Juve's comeback game in Serie A versus Livorno, a crushing 5–1 victory. However, he endured a difficult time at the Turin club. He was deemed "too soft" to be a centre-back after Francesco Totti scored twice in six minutes in the September game, a 2–2 draw, against Roma from his side of the pitch. Criscito was substituted at half-time. After that, he found himself behind Nicola Legrottaglie and Giorgio Chiellini in the pecking order due to their outstanding form.

=== Return to Genoa ===
Not happy to remain on the bench, Criscito opted to return to Genoa on loan in the opening days of the 2007–08 winter transfer window. On 3 July 2008, he was sent on loan to Genoa again for €1 million with the Ligurian club having the option to purchase half of his contract for €5.5 million. In February 2009, he scored his first goal since returning to Genoa, the winner against Palermo. In June 2009, Genoa exercised the option to sign him in a co-ownership for a pre-agreed price. He was very impressive after re-joining Genoa, who were back in Serie A by then, and he retained a place in the starting line-up as Gian Piero Gasperini's first choice left-back. However, he did not rule out a return to Juventus after being linked to a permanent return to replace Fabio Grosso. In September against Napoli, Criscito was shown a straight red card for allegedly swearing at the referee after being penalized for a foul on Christian Maggio, but Gasperini later defended the 23-year-old saying that he was angry at himself, not the referee. The appeal to rescind the red card was turned down, but his ban was reduced to two to three matchdays.

On 25 June 2010, Juventus announced that Criscito's remaining 50% registration rights were sold for another €6 million fee. However co-currently 50% registration rights of Leonardo Bonucci was signed from Genoa via Bari for €8 million.

=== Zenit ===
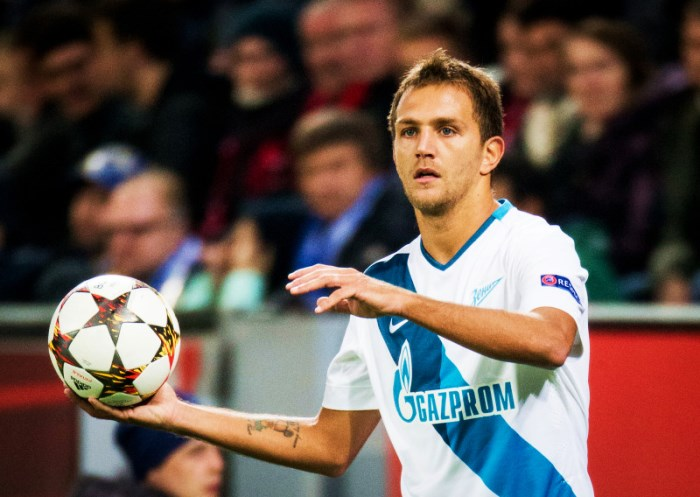
Criscito with Zenit in 2014

On 27 June 2011, Criscito signed for Russian Premier League club Zenit for €11 million fee. He penned a five-year contract with the club. He made his debut for the club on 6 August in a 2–0 away victory against CSKA Moscow, providing an assist for teammate Aleksandr Kerzhakov. He ended the season as a league champion, his first career silverware.

On 12 July 2015, he scored the winning penalty in a 4–2 shoot-out victory in the 2015 Russian Super Cup over Lokomotiv Moscow.

On 8 May 2018, he announced that he would be leaving Zenit upon the expiration of his contract at the end of the 2017–18 season. A game against FC SKA-Khabarovsk was his official farewell game for Zenit.

=== Third spell in Genoa ===
In May 2018, it was reported that Criscito had announced to sign for his former club Genoa via his personal Instagram account. His return was officially announced by the club on 24 May. A few days later he was assigned number 4 shirt.

Criscito's contract with Genoa was terminated by mutual consent on 24 June 2022.

=== Toronto FC ===
On 29 June 2022, Toronto FC announced the signing of Criscito on a TAM contract. The signing followed the arrival of former Italy teammate and good friend, Lorenzo Insigne. A move to the club was initially speculated in March 2022, but fell through. Despite receiving offers to join other Italian clubs, Criscito opted for a move to Canada to avoid playing against Genoa in the future. He made his debut for Toronto FC on 9 July against the San Jose Earthquakes in a 2–2 home draw. In the 2022 Canadian Championship Final against Vancouver Whitecaps FC on 26 July at BC Place, following a 1–1 draw, he converted a penalty in the resulting shoot-out, although Toronto ultimately lost 5–3. He scored his first goal for the club on 17 August, the equalizing goal, from a volley, of a 2–2 home draw against New England Revolution. In November 2022, he announced his retirement.

=== Fourth spell at Genoa and retirement ===
On 27 December 2022, Genoa announced that Criscito would return from retirement and rejoin the club on 2 January 2023. On 19 May 2023, after the 4–3 match win over Bari, he announced his retirement from football at the age of 36, after scoring the winning goal from a penalty kick in the 94th minute and securing Genoa's promotion to Serie A.

== International career ==
On 14 November 2006, Criscito made his debut for the Italy Under-21 squad in a match against the Czech Republic. He appeared in two European Under-21 Championships, in 2007 and 2009, reaching the semi-finals of the latter tournament. In 2008, he also represented Italy at the Summer Olympics.

On 12 August 2009, he made his senior national team debut in a friendly against Switzerland in Basel. After a promising season, he was named in Marcello Lippi's 23-man squad for the 2010 World Cup in South Africa, where he was the starting left-back; Italy were eliminated in the first round of the tournament following a 3–2 loss to Slovakia in their final group match on 24 June.

Criscito was named to Italy's Euro 2012 squad by Cesare Prandelli, but withdrew from the team after he came under investigation due to the Scommessopoli match fixing scandal. Criscito went on to criticize the Italian FA for the decision to drop him despite the limited selection of left-backs. Several months later he was cleared of all charges.

Criscito was unused by Italy between March 2014 and May 2018, when he returned in a 2–1 friendly win over Saudi Arabia under Roberto Mancini. On 4 June, he was sent off for a foul on Ryan Babel in a 1–1 friendly draw with the Netherlands in Turin.

== Style of play ==
Criscito was a tactically versatile player, who was capable of being both an effective attacking and defensive threat as a full-back. He began his career as a left-footed centre-back, but he was moved to the position of left-back while playing for Genoa, where he was also employed as a wing-back or as a wide midfielder on occasion under manager Gian Piero Gasperini in Genoa's 3–4–3 formation. Criscito was described as a quick defender, with good technique, distribution, and man-marking ability.

== Coaching career ==
After retirement, Criscito stayed on at Genoa as a youth coach, first in charge of the Under-14 team, then being promoted as Under-17 coach in 2024.

On 1 November 2025, Criscito was temporarily appointed as assistant coach of Genoa, with technical collaborator Roberto Murgita serving as caretaker, following the departure of head coach Patrick Vieira.

== Personal life ==
Criscito is married to Pamela Chiccoli and they have two sons and one daughter.

== Career statistics ==
=== Club ===
Appearances and goals by club, season and competition
Club	Season	League			Cup		Continental		Other		Total	
Club	Season	Division	Apps	Goals	Apps	Goals	Apps	Goals	Apps	Goals	Apps	Goals
Genoa	2002–03	Serie B	1	0	0	0	–		–		1	0
Juventus	2005–06	Serie A	0	0	0	0	0	0	–		0	0
Juventus	2007–08	Serie A	8	0	1	0	–		–		9	0
Juventus	Total		8	0	1	0	0	0	0	0	9	0
Genoa (loan)	2006–07	Serie B	36	4	3	0	–		–		39	4
Genoa (loan)	2007–08	Serie A	16	0	–		–		–		16	0
Genoa (loan)	2008–09	Serie A	35	3	2	0	–		–		37	3
Genoa (loan)	Total		87	7	5	0	0	0	0	0	92	7
Genoa	2009–10	Serie A	29	2	0	0	6	1	–		35	3
Genoa	2010–11	Serie A	36	0	1	0	–		–		37	0
Genoa	Total		65	2	1	0	6	1	0	0	72	3
Zenit Saint Petersburg	2011–12	Russian Premier League	25	1	1	0	7	0	–		33	1
Zenit Saint Petersburg	2012–13	Russian Premier League	12	2	1	1	4	0	1 (Note: Appearance in Russian Super Cup)	0	18	3
Zenit Saint Petersburg	2013–14	Russian Premier League	18	1	1	0	7	0	–		26	1
Zenit Saint Petersburg	2014–15	Russian Premier League	25	2	1	0	14	1	–		40	3
Zenit Saint Petersburg	2015–16	Russian Premier League	23	1	5	0	6	0	1	0	35	1
Zenit Saint Petersburg	2016–17	Russian Premier League	25	4	0	0	7	1	1	0	33	5
Zenit Saint Petersburg	2017–18	Russian Premier League	28	4	0	0	12	2	–		40	6
Zenit Saint Petersburg	Total		156	15	9	1	57	4	3	0	225	20
Genoa	2018–19	Serie A	35	2	1	0	–		–		36	2
Genoa	2019–20	Serie A	26	8	2	2	–		–		28	10
Genoa	2020–21	Serie A	23	1	1	0	–		–		24	1
Genoa	2021–22	Serie A	20	6	1	1	–		–		21	7
Genoa	Total		104	17	5	3	0	0	0	0	109	20
Toronto FC	2022	MLS	15	1	1	0	–		–		16	1
Genoa	2022–23	Serie B	16	1	1	0	–		–		17	1
Career total			452	43	23	4	63	5	3	0	541	52

=== International ===
Appearances and goals by national team and year
National team	Year	Apps	Goals
Italy	2009	4	0
Italy	2010	8	0
Italy	2011	6	0
Italy	2012	2	0
Italy	2013	1	0
Italy	2014	1	0
Italy	2018	4	0
Total		26	0

== Honours ==
Zenit Saint Petersburg

- Russian Premier League: 2011–12, 2014–15
- Russian Cup: 2015–16
- Russian Super Cup: 2015, 2016

Italy U21

- UEFA European Under-21 Championship bronze: 2009
