= Aleksandr Kerzhakov =

Russian footballer and manager

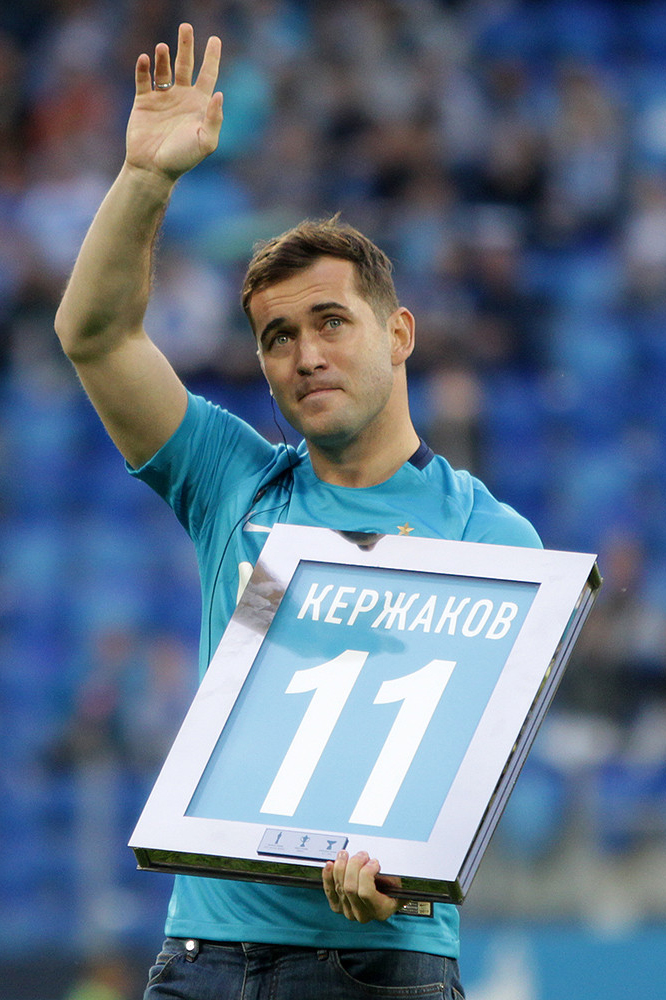
- Kerzhakov in 2017

Personal information
- Full name: Aleksandr Anatolyevich Kerzhakov
- Date of birth: 27 November 1982 (age 43)
- Place of birth: Kingisepp, Leningrad Oblast, Russian SFSR, Soviet Union
- Height: 1.76 m (5 ft 9 in)
- Position: Striker

Senior career*
| Years | Team | Apps | (Gls) |
| 2001–2006 | Zenit Saint Petersburg | 159 | (64) |
| 2006–2008 | Sevilla | 26 | (8) |
| 2008–2010 | Dynamo Moscow | 51 | (19) |
| 2010–2017 | Zenit Saint Petersburg | 129 | (56) |
| 2016 | → Zürich (loan) | 17 | (5) |
| Total | | 382 | (152) |

International career
| 2001–2002 | Russia U21 | 4 | (2) |
| 2002–2016 | Russia | 91 | (30) |

Managerial career
- 2017–2018: Russia U17
- 2018–2019: Russia U18
- 2019–2020: Russia U19
- 2020–2021: Tom Tomsk
- 2021–2022: Nizhny Novgorod
- 2023: Karmiotissa
- 2023: Spartak Subotica
- 2024: Kairat
- * Club domestic league appearances and goals

Aleksandr Anatolyevich Kerzhakov (Russian: Александр Анатольевич Кержаков [ɐlʲɪˈksandr ɐnɐˈtolʲjɪvʲɪtɕ kʲɪrʐɐˈkof]; born 27 November 1982) is a Russian professional football manager and former player who played as a striker.

He used to be the most prolific goalscorer in the history of Russian football from 2013 to 2025, with the number of goals scored in competitive games standing at 233. He is described as a forward who likes to "drop deep to link with the midfield, expecting players to break beyond him" for whom he creates space.

A full international since 2002, Kerzhakov earned 90 caps for Russia and played at two World Cups and two European Championships. In 2014, he surpassed the record held by Vladimir Beschastnykh for most goals for the Russian national team.

== Club career ==
=== Zenit ===
Born in Kingisepp, Leningrad Oblast, he spent the 2000 season at amateur club FC Svetogorets Svetogorsk, helping them win the Northwest regional league by scoring 18 goals.

In 2001 Kerzhakov transferred to FC Zenit Saint Petersburg, debuting in March and scoring his first goal in June against Spartak Moscow. In his first season, Kerzhakov was the second choice striker behind Hennadiy Popovych. However, later in 2001, he helped Zenit finish third in the Russian Premier League and runners-up in 2003. In 2002, Kerzhakov developed a striking partnership with Andrey Arshavin which earned them both call-ups to the Russian national team. That year Kerzhakov represented Russia at the 2002 FIFA World Cup.

In 2003, Czech manager Vlastimil Petržela used Kerzhakov as a first choice striker and he became the top scorer of the Russian Premier League the following season. While under Petržela, Kerzhakov started in all four group games of the 2004–05 UEFA Cup and went on to score a hat trick in a 5–1 victory over AEK Athens. The following season, he was in the starting line up once again in Zenit's second straight UEFA Cup campaign. Zenit qualified for the round of 32 by overcoming Vitória, Beşiktaş, Bolton, and Sevilla. In the knockout stages, Kerzhakov scored against Rosenborg and Olympique de Marseille as Zenit reached the quarterfinals to face Sevilla. Kerzhakov gave his best performance by scoring a goal in the away leg but could not save his team as they lost out 5–2 on aggregate.

=== Sevilla ===
With decreased playing timed following the appointment of Dick Advocaat at Zenit, Kerzhakov transferred to Sevilla in December 2006, signing a five-and-a-half-year contract worth €5 million, as part of the deal of the partnership of the clubs.

Under then manager Juande Ramos, Kerzhakov featured alongside Luís Fabiano and Frédéric Kanouté. He played his first match on 14 January 2007 and scored his first goal on 28 January 2007 in a 4–2 victory against Levante UD. He scored the winning goal against Tottenham in a 4–3 victory in the UEFA Cup quarter-finals on 5 April 2007. Kerzhakov later contributed to Sevilla's victorious run in the 2006–07 UEFA Cup season.

After Juande Ramos moved to Tottenham Hotspur in October 2007, Kerzhakov's playing time decreased under caretaker manager Manuel Jiménez. Being selected behind Luís Fabiano, Frédéric Kanouté, Javier Chevantón, and Arouna Koné, it was speculated that Kerzhakov would quit Sevilla following interest from Tottenham, Manchester United, and Paris Saint-Germain.

According to Russian newspaper Sport-Express, on 30 January 2008, Kerzhakov stated he would stay at Sevilla to help in the La Liga and UEFA Champions League campaigns.

=== Dynamo Moscow ===
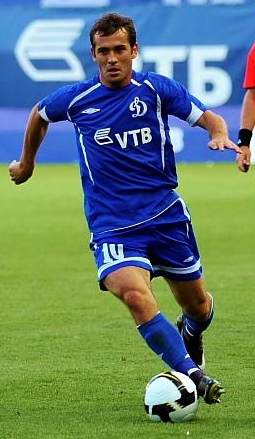
Kerzhakov in action for Dynamo Moscow in 2009

In February 2008, after being left out of Sevilla's Champions League tie against Fenerbahçe, Kerzhakov signed a three-year contract with Russian side Dinamo Moscow. Kerzhakov established himself as a first choice striker with Tsvetan Genkov and Cícero, scoring his first goal against FC Moscow. He finished the 2008 season as the top scorer in the squad with seven goals, helping the club finish in third place and earn a play off spot in the qualifiers for the UEFA Champions League.

During the 2009 season, Kerzhakov maintained his spot as a first choice striker ahead of Aleksandr Kokorin and Fyodor Smolov but Dynamo finished eighth and lost to Celtic and CSKA Sophia in an attempt to qualify for the Champions League and inaugural Europa League.

=== Return to Zenit ===
In January 2010, Kerzhakov rescinded the last year of his contract with Dynamo and returned to his first professional club Zenit St. Petersburg. Under incoming manager Luciano Spalletti, Kerzhakov became the first choice striker in a 4-2-3-1 formation and managed twenty six appearances. He scored his first goal against CSKA Moscow in April 2010 and followed up with two hat tricks against R.S.C. Anderlecht in the UEFA Europa League and Saturn Moscow in the domestic league.

The following season began with a disappointing loss to FC Twente in the round of 16 of the Europa League. However, Kerzhakov went on to score 23 goals in 32 appearances in the Russian Premier League, finishing as the second highest goal scorer behind CSKA Moscow's Seydou Doumbia. Zenit finished first in the regular season and then won the championship group in the spring of 2012 to claim their second league title in two years.

During the 2012–13 season, Kerzhakov was a first choice striker in Spalletti's 4-2-3-1 formation, netting 11 goals in the league, including braces against Amkar Perm, Mordovia Saransk, and Spartak Vladikavkaz. He participated in the UEFA Champions League, scoring his only goal outside the Russian Premier League against Anderlecht. After Zenit failed to make the knockout stage, Kerzhakov played in the UEFA Europa League but failed to score as his club lost to F.C. Basel in the round of 16. With Spalletti purchasing Salomón Rondón midway through the 2013–14 season, Kerzhakov's playing time decreased amid reports of a strained relationship with the Italian manager.

After the arrival of Andre Villas-Boas in March 2014, Kerzhakov in five of the last nine matches of the season as Zenit finished in second place behind CSKA Moscow. The following season, Zenit won the league with Kerzhakov playing in 14 matches and scoring three goals. He also played in the club's Champions League campaign, coming on as a substitute in three of the group stage matches. Kerzhakov started the 2014–15 season with a brace in an 8–1 victory over Torpedo Moscow as Zenit won the first eight matches in the league. Villas-Boas used Kerzhakov as a substitute with speculations of a rift between the two. Villas Boas excluded Kerzhakov from the squad during the 2015–16 season, with the striker making no appearances in the league or European tournaments before being loaned out to FC Zurich.

=== Zurich ===
At Zurich, Sami Hyypiä used Kerzhakov as a striker in a 4-2-3-1 formation. He would go on to score five goals in seventeen appearances in a campaign that ended in the club's relegation from the Swiss Super League.

=== Final season at Zenit ===
Kerzhakov returned to Zenit for the 2016–17 season under Mircea Lucescu. Lucescu used Kerzhakov as a substitute striker, only starting him in the first match of the season. Kerzhakov officially retired on 13 July 2017 and was appointed the coordinator of Zenit's youth and academy teams.

== International career ==
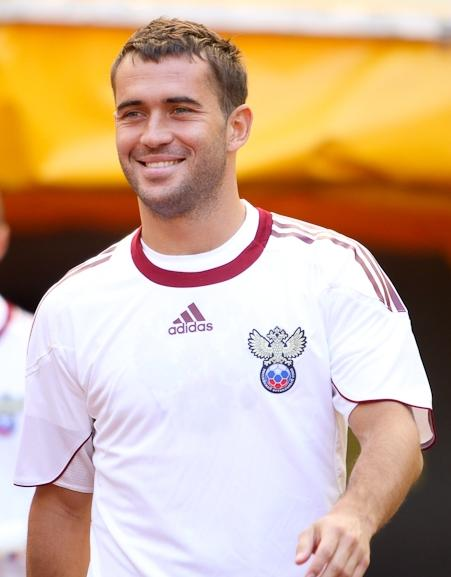
Kerzhakov with the Russia national football team in 2011

=== Early international career ===
Kerzhakov began playing for the Russian U21 team in 2001. He made his senior debut for Russia in a friendly against Estonia on 27 March 2002. Two months later, Oleg Romantsev selected Kerzhakov for the 2002 FIFA World Cup as one of four strikers alongside Vladimir Beschastnykh, Ruslan Pimenov, and Dmitri Sychev. He was on the bench for Russia's first two games against Tunisia and Japan but came on for Valery Karpin against Belgium in the 82nd minute and provided an assist for Sychev in an eventual 3–2 defeat.

After Romanstev's sacking, new manager Valery Gazzaev made Kerzhakov a regular call up in the squad. Just prior to the start of the UEFA Euro 2004 qualifiers, Kerzhakov scored his first goal for Russia in a friendly 1–1 draw against Sweden on 21 August 2002. In 2003, he won the Cyprus International Football Tournament, playing in the final match.

After making eight appearances in the qualification tournament, he was selected by Georgi Yartsev for the final tournament as one of four strikers in the squad behind with Dmitri Bulykin, Dmitri Kirichenko, and Dmitri Sychev. He was on the bench for the games against Spain and Greece, but played a full game against Portugal, as Russia was eliminated from the group stage.

=== 2004–2010 ===
Following Euro 2004, Kerzhakov featured regularly under Yartsev during the 2006 World Cup qualifiers and scored a goal against Liechtenstein in March 2005. Yartsev's successor Yuri Semin, continued to select Kerzhakov as he went on to score three goals including a double against Liechtenstein as Russia failed to qualify for final tournament.

Under Guus Hiddink, Kerzhakov continued his role as the first choice striker but was dropped after limited appearances for Zenit in late 2006. Upon moving to Sevilla, Hiddink overlooked Kerzhakov for a friendly against the Netherlands in February 2007. Being recalled for a UEFA Euro 2008 qualifier against Estonia and scored both goals in a 2–0 victory. In June 2007, Kerzhakov scored a hat-trick in a 4–0 victory over Andorra. He made a further contribution to Russia's Euro 2008 qualification campaign by scoring a goal in a 3–0 victory over North Macedonia in September 2007. Despite being the top scorer for Russia with five goals, Kerzhakov failed to make Hiddink's 23-man squad for the tournament finals.

After an 18-month exclusion, Kerzhakov was recalled in May 2009 for the 2010 FIFA World Cup Qualifier against Finland in Helsinki. He started the game and scored two goals as Russia defeated Finland 3–0 and went on to play for the remainder of the campaign. During the playoff against Slovenia, Kerzhakov was on the bench for first leg but came on at half-time for Roman Pavlyuchenko in the second leg. In the 66th minute, he received a straight red card from Terje Hauge for a deliberate kick at Slovenian goalkeeper Samir Handanović. Slovenia emerged victorious with a 1–0 win and eliminated Russia after an aggregate 2–2 draw on away goals.

=== 2010–2016: Record goalscorer and last appearances ===
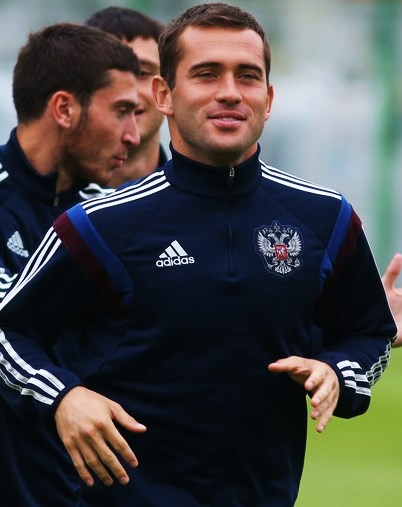
Kerzhakov training for Russia on 3 September 2014, ahead of the game when he broke the record for most goals for Russia

Kerzhakov's red card against Slovenia resulted in a suspension for two qualifiers of the Euro 2012 campaign. Upon being recalled by Dick Advocaat, Kerzhakov scored in the victories over Ireland and Macedonia. He did not score again for the rest of the qualification campaign but managed to make three additional appearances as Russia topped Group B to qualify directly for the final tournament. Advocaat included him in the final tournament squad, but he scored no goals as Russia failed to progress from their group.

After Euro 2012, former England manager Fabio Capello utilized Kerzhakov as the first choice striker after dropping Andrei Arshavin, Roman Pavlyuchenko, and Pavel Pogrebnyak. Kerzhakov appeared in all ten of Russia's qualification matches and finished as the team's top goalscorer with five goals, including the winning goal in a 1–0 defeat of Portugal.

Making Capello's squad for the 2014 FIFA World Cup, Kerzhakov appeared as a 71st-minute substitute for Yuri Zhirkov and scored the team's equalising goal three minutes later in the opening match of the tournament, a 1–1 draw with South Korea. The goal was his 26th for Russia, equaling Vladimir Beschastnykh's record for the national team. Kerzhakov came on as a late substitute for Aleksandr Samedov in Russia's 0–1 defeat to Belgium. He started in the final group match against Algeria before being substituted for Maksim Kanunnikov in a 1–1 draw as Russia were eliminated in the first round.

On 3 September 2014, he became the top scorer for the Russian national team after netting two goals in a 4–0 friendly win over Azerbaijan.

Kerzhakov continued to appear in Capello's squads for the UEFA Euro 2016 qualification campaign. He was on the bench against Sweden and Austria while being substituted at half-time against Liechtenstein and Moldova. Kerzhakov went on to appear as a second-half substitute in the 0–1 home defeat to Austria in what was Capello's last match at Russia coach. Capello's successor, Leonid Slutsky, omitted Kerzhakov from the remaining qualification matches as well as the final tournament. He made his final appearance for the national team in a friendly against Lithuania on 26 March 2016.

== Coaching career ==
On 15 March 2018, the Russian Football Union announced signing a contract with Kerzhakov to manage the Russia national under-17 football team until the end of 2019. The team became Russia national under-18 football team in September 2018 as the players aged and then Russia national under-19 football team. On 24 September 2020, he was hired as manager by the FNL club FC Tom Tomsk. He left Tom at the end of the 2020–21 season. On 17 June 2021, he signed with FC Nizhny Novgorod, which was recently promoted into the Russian Premier League. The club avoided relegation at the end of the 2021–22 season, and on 16 June 2022 Kerzhakov left Nizhny Novgorod. He moved to with his family to Dubai but did not have a job there. On 8 February 2023, Kerzhakov was hired as a manager by Cypriot club Karmiotissa. He left Karmiotissa after one victory in six games under his management on 1 April 2023, moving back to Dubai. In May 2024, he became the manager of Kairat, a club in the Kazakhstan Premier League. On 3 September that year, his contract was terminated by mutual agreement, and Kerzhakov left the club. Under his leadership, Kairat played 12 matches. In these games, the team won six times, drew three times, and lost three times.

== Personal life ==
His younger brother, Mikhail, is a professional footballer who also plays for Zenit Saint Petersburg as a goalkeeper. In 2002, Kerzhakov authored his autobiography titled Up to 16 and older. (Russian: До 16 и старше)

In April 2023, Kerzhakov said that he opposed the invasion of Ukraine, and has left Russia since then.

== Career statistics ==
=== Club ===
Appearances and goals by club, season and competition
| Club | Season | League | | | National cup (Note: Includes Russian Cup, Copa del Rey, Swiss Cup) | | Europe | | Other | | Total | |
| Club | Season | Division | Apps | Goals | Apps | Goals | Apps | Goals | Apps | Goals | Apps | Goals |
|---|---|---|---|---|---|---|---|---|---|---|---|---|
| Zenit Saint Petersburg | 2001 | Russian Top Division | 28 | 6 | 5 | 2 | 0 | 0 | – | | 33 | 8 |
| Zenit Saint Petersburg | 2002 | Russian Premier League | 29 | 14 | 2 | 0 | 2 | 2 | – | | 33 | 16 |
| Zenit Saint Petersburg | 2003 | Russian Premier League | 27 | 13 | 3 | 3 | – | | – | | 30 | 16 |
| Zenit Saint Petersburg | 2004 | Russian Premier League | 29 | 18 | 6 | 6 | 7 (Note: Appearances in UEFA Cup) | 6 | – | | 42 | 30 |
| Zenit Saint Petersburg | 2005 | Russian Premier League | 25 | 7 | 5 | 5 | 8 | 3 | – | | 38 | 15 |
| Zenit Saint Petersburg | 2006 | Russian Premier League | 21 | 6 | 2 | 0 | 6 | 4 | – | | 29 | 10 |
| Zenit Saint Petersburg | Total | | 159 | 64 | 23 | 16 | 23 | 15 | 0 | 0 | 205 | 95 |
| Sevilla | 2006–07 | La Liga | 15 | 5 | 5 | 0 | 8 | 2 | – | | 27 | 7 |
| Sevilla | 2007–08 | La Liga | 11 | 3 | 3 | 0 | 3 (Note: Appearances in UEFA Champions League) | 1 | 2 (Note: One appearance in Supercopa de España, one appearance in UEFA Super Cup) | 0 | 19 | 4 |
| Sevilla | Total | | 26 | 8 | 8 | 0 | 11 | 3 | 2 | 0 | 46 | 11 |
| Dynamo Moscow | 2008 | Russian Premier League | 27 | 7 | 2 | 1 | – | | – | | 29 | 8 |
| Dynamo Moscow | 2009 | Russian Premier League | 24 | 12 | 2 | 2 | 4 | 1 | – | | 30 | 15 |
| Dynamo Moscow | Total | | 51 | 19 | 4 | 3 | 4 | 1 | 0 | 0 | 59 | 23 |
| Zenit Saint Petersburg | 2010 | Russian Premier League | 28 | 13 | 3 | 0 | 5 | 4 | – | | 36 | 17 |
| Zenit Saint Petersburg | 2011–12 | Russian Premier League | 32 | 23 | 3 | 0 | 7 | 1 | – | | 42 | 24 |
| Zenit Saint Petersburg | 2012–13 | Russian Premier League | 23 | 10 | 0 | 0 | 8 (Note: Five appearances and one goal in UEFA Champions League, three appearances in UEFA Europa League) | 1 | 0 | 0 | 31 | 11 |
| Zenit Saint Petersburg | 2013–14 | Russian Premier League | 19 | 6 | 1 | 0 | 11 | 3 | 1 (Note: Appearance in Russian Super Cup) | 0 | 32 | 9 |
| Zenit Saint Petersburg | 2014–15 | Russian Premier League | 14 | 3 | 1 | 0 | 6 (Note: Five appearances and one goal in UEFA Champions League, one appearance in UEFA Europa League) | 1 | – | | 21 | 4 |
| Zenit Saint Petersburg | 2016–17 | Russian Premier League | 13 | 1 | 0 | 0 | 3 (Note: Appearances in UEFA Europa League) | 1 | 1 | 0 | 17 | 2 |
| Zenit Saint Petersburg | Total | | 129 | 56 | 8 | 0 | 40 | 11 | 2 | 0 | 179 | 67 |
| FC Zürich | 2015–16 | Swiss Super League | 17 | 5 | 2 | 2 | 0 | 0 | 0 | 0 | 19 | 7 |
| Career total | | | 382 | 152 | 46 | 21 | 78 | 30 | 4 | 0 | 508 | 203 |

=== International ===
Appearances and goals by national team and year
| National team | Year | Apps | Goals |
|---|---|---|---|
| Russia | 2002 | 7 | 3 |
| Russia | 2003 | 8 | 0 |
| Russia | 2004 | 7 | 0 |
| Russia | 2005 | 10 | 4 |
| Russia | 2006 | 5 | 0 |
| Russia | 2007 | 7 | 6 |
| Russia | 2008 | 0 | 0 |
| Russia | 2009 | 6 | 2 |
| Russia | 2010 | 2 | 2 |
| Russia | 2011 | 5 | 0 |
| Russia | 2012 | 12 | 5 |
| Russia | 2013 | 8 | 2 |
| Russia | 2014 | 11 | 5 |
| Russia | 2015 | 2 | 1 |
| Russia | 2016 | 1 | 0 |
| Total | | 91 | 30 |

Scores and results list Russia's goal tally first, score column indicates score after each Kerzhakov goal.

List of international goals scored by Aleksandr Kerzhakov
| No. | Date | Venue | Opponent | Score | Result | Competition |
|---|---|---|---|---|---|---|
| 1 | 21 August 2002 | Lokomotiv Stadium, Moscow, Russia | Sweden | 1–0 | 1–1 | Friendly match |
| 2 | 7 September 2002 | Lokomotiv Stadium, Moscow, Russia | Republic of Ireland | 3–1 | 4–2 | UEFA Euro 2004 qualification |
| 3 | 16 October 2002 | Central Stadium, Volgograd, Russia | Albania | 1–0 | 4–1 | UEFA Euro 2004 qualification |
| 4 | 26 March 2005 | Rheinpark Stadion, Vaduz, Liechtenstein | Liechtenstein | 1–0 | 2–1 | 2006 FIFA World Cup qualification |
| 5 | 3 September 2005 | Lokomotiv Stadium, Moscow, Russia | Liechtenstein | 1–0 | 2–0 | 2006 FIFA World Cup qualification |
| 6 | 3 September 2005 | Lokomotiv Stadium, Moscow, Russia | Liechtenstein | 2–0 | 2–0 | 2006 FIFA World Cup qualification |
| 7 | 8 October 2005 | Lokomotiv Stadium, Moscow, Russia | Luxembourg | 2–0 | 5–1 | 2006 FIFA World Cup qualification |
| 8 | 24 March 2007 | A. Le Coq Arena, Tallinn, Estonia | Estonia | 1–0 | 2–0 | UEFA Euro 2008 qualification |
| 9 | 24 March 2007 | A. Le Coq Arena, Tallinn, Estonia | Estonia | 2–0 | 2–0 | UEFA Euro 2008 qualification |
| 10 | 2 June 2007 | Petrovsky Stadium, Saint Petersburg, Russia | Andorra | 1–0 | 4–0 | UEFA Euro 2008 qualification |
| 11 | 2 June 2007 | Petrovsky Stadium, Saint Petersburg, Russia | Andorra | 2–0 | 4–0 | UEFA Euro 2008 qualification |
| 12 | 2 June 2007 | Petrovsky Stadium, Saint Petersburg, Russia | Andorra | 3–0 | 4–0 | UEFA Euro 2008 qualification |
| 13 | 8 September 2007 | Lokomotiv Stadium, Moscow, Russia | Macedonia | 3–0 | 3–0 | UEFA Euro 2008 qualification |
| 14 | 10 June 2009 | Helsinki Olympic Stadium, Helsinki, Finland | Finland | 1–0 | 3–0 | 2010 FIFA World Cup qualification |
| 15 | 10 June 2009 | Helsinki Olympic Stadium, Helsinki, Finland | Finland | 2–0 | 3–0 | 2010 FIFA World Cup qualification |
| 16 | 8 October 2010 | Aviva Stadium, Dublin, Ireland | Republic of Ireland | 1–0 | 3–2 | UEFA Euro 2012 qualification |
| 17 | 12 October 2010 | Philip II Arena, Skopje, Macedonia | Macedonia | 1–0 | 1–0 | UEFA Euro 2012 qualification |
| 18 | 25 May 2012 | Lokomotiv Stadium, Moscow, Russia | Uruguay | 1–1 | 1–1 | Friendly match |
| 19 | 1 June 2012 | Letzigrund, Zurich, Switzerland | Italy | 1–0 | 3–0 | Friendly match |
| 20 | 11 September 2012 | National Stadium, Ramat Gan, Israel | Israel | 1–0 | 4–0 | 2014 FIFA World Cup qualification |
| 21 | 11 September 2012 | National Stadium, Ramat Gan, Israel | Israel | 3–0 | 4–0 | 2014 FIFA World Cup qualification |
| 22 | 12 October 2012 | Luzhniki Stadium, Moscow, Russia | Portugal | 1–0 | 1–0 | 2014 FIFA World Cup qualification |
| 23 | 6 September 2013 | Central Stadium, Kazan, Russia | Luxembourg | 3–0 | 4–1 | 2014 FIFA World Cup qualification |
| 24 | 11 October 2013 | Stade Josy Barthel, Luxembourg, Luxembourg | Luxembourg | 4–0 | 4–0 | 2014 FIFA World Cup qualification |
| 25 | 26 May 2014 | Petrovsky Stadium, Saint Petersburg, Russia | Slovakia | 1–0 | 1–0 | Friendly match |
| 26 | 18 June 2014 | Arena Pantanal, Cuiabá, Brazil | South Korea | 1–1 | 1–1 | 2014 FIFA World Cup |
| 27 | 3 September 2014 | Arena Khimki, Khimki, Russia | Azerbaijan | 1–0 | 4–0 | Friendly match |
| 28 | 3 September 2014 | Arena Khimki, Khimki, Russia | Azerbaijan | 2–0 | 4–0 | Friendly match |
| 29 | 18 November 2014 | Groupama Arena, Budapest, Hungary | Hungary | 2–0 | 2–1 | Friendly match |
| 30 | 7 June 2015 | Arena Khimki, Khimki, Russia | Belarus | 4–2 | 4–2 | Friendly match |

== Managerial statistics ==
As of 3 October 2024

| Team | Nat | From | To | Record | | | | | | | |
| Team | Nat | From | To | G | W | D | L | GF | GA | GD | Win % |
|---|---|---|---|---|---|---|---|---|---|---|---|
| Russia U18 | (Russia) | 1 September 2018 | 30 June 2019 | 17 | 8 | 1 | 8 | 31 | 25 | +6 | 47.06 |
| Russia U19 | (Russia) | 1 July 2019 | 24 September 2020 | 9 | 4 | 5 | 0 | 23 | 8 | +15 | 44.44 |
| Tom Tomsk | (Russia) | 24 September 2020 | 9 June 2021 | 28 | 10 | 6 | 12 | 27 | 31 | −4 | 35.71 |
| Nizhny Novgorod | (Russia) | 17 June 2021 | 16 June 2022 | 33 | 10 | 9 | 14 | 28 | 42 | −14 | 30.30 |
| Karmiotissa | (Cyprus) | 8 February 2023 | 1 April 2023 | 7 | 2 | 1 | 4 | 10 | 14 | −4 | 28.57 |
| Spartak Subotica | (Serbia) | 12 June 2023 | 13 November 2023 | 15 | 5 | 1 | 9 | 14 | 25 | −11 | 33.33 |
| Kairat | (Kazakhstan) | 29 May 2024 | 3 September 2024 | 12 | 6 | 3 | 3 | 23 | 18 | +5 | 50.00 |
| Total | | | | 121 | 45 | 26 | 50 | 155 | 163 | −8 | 37.19 |

== Honours ==
Zenit Saint Petersburg

- Russian Premier League: 2010, 2011–12, 2014–15
- Russian Cup: 2009–10
- Russian Premier League Cup: 2003
- Russian Super Cup: 2016

Sevilla

- UEFA Cup: 2006–07
- Copa del Rey: 2006–07
- Supercopa de España: 2007

FC Zürich

- Swiss Cup: 2015–16

Individual

- Russian Premier League top scorer: 2004

== Charity ==
In 2017, he became an ambassador of social Football for Friendship international children's forum. In 2018, he took part in the Football for Friendship programme where he presented the cup to the winners of the final match of the programme's championship.

== Political views ==
Kerzhakov opposed the Russian invasion of Ukraine and connected leaving Russia in 2022 with the opposition to the invasion.
