= Nikita Telenkov =

Russian footballer

Personal information
- Full name: Nikita Igorevich Telenkov
- Date of birth: 29 May 1987 (age 39)
- Place of birth: Brezhnev, Russian SFSR
- Height: 1.77 m (5 ft 10 in)
- Position: Midfielder

Youth career
- Neftekhimik Nizhnekamsk

Senior career*
Years	Team	Apps	(Gls)
2005–2009	Neftekhimik Nizhnekamsk	114	(4)
2010–2013	Volga Ulyanovsk	85	(2)
2013–2019	Tyumen	159	(10)
2020–2021	Nosta Novotroitsk	35	(4)
2022–2023	Zenit-Izhevsk	30	(0)
2023–2025	Nosta Novotroitsk	63	(2)
- * Club domestic league appearances and goals as of 19 October 2025

Nikita Igorevich Telenkov (Russian: Ники́та И́горевич Телéнков; born 29 May 1987) is a Russian professional football player.

== Club career ==
He made his Russian Football National League debut for FC Tyumen on 12 July 2014 in a game against FC Gazovik Orenburg.
