= Georgios Eleftheriou =

Cypriot footballer (born 1984)

Personal information
- Full name: Georgios Eleftheriou
- Date of birth: September 30, 1984 (age 42)
- Place of birth: Nicosia, Cyprus
- Height: 1.67 m (5 ft 5 1/2 in)
- Positions: Right back; right midfielder

Youth career
- APOEL

Senior career*
| Years | Team | Apps | (Gls) |
| 2003–2006 | APOEL | 13 | (1) |
| 2006–2007 | → Digenis Morphou (loan) | 24 | (3) |
| 2007–2008 | Nea Salamina | 15 | (2) |
| 2008–2011 | Doxa Katokopias | 59 | (5) |
| 2011–2016 | AEL Limassol | 72 | (1) |
| 2016–2017 | Nea Salamina | 9 | (0) |
| 2017–2018 | PAEEK | | |
| 2018–2019 | ASIL Lysi | | |

International career
| 2013–2015 | Cyprus | 2 | (0) |
- * Club domestic league appearances and goals

Georgios Eleftheriou (Greek: Γεώργιος Ελευθερίου; born 30 September 1984) is a retired Cypriot defender.

Eleftheriou announced his retirement at the end of the 2018–19 season.
