= Andrei Yakovlev =

Russian footballer

Personal information
- Full name: Andrei Denisovich Yakovlev
- Date of birth: 12 January 1995 (age 31)
- Place of birth: Saint Petersburg, Russia
- Height: 1.79 m (5 ft 10 in)
- Position: Defender

Youth career
- –2007: FC Zenit St. Petersburg
- 2007–2008: Kolomyagi St. Petersburg
- 2008–2009: Smena
- 2009–2010: Kolomyagi St. Petersburg
- 2010–2013: FC Neva-Sport St. Petersburg

Senior career*
Years	Team	Apps	(Gls)
2013–2015	FC Zenit St. Petersburg	0	(0)
2015	→ FC Zenit-2 St. Petersburg	2	(0)
2015	FK Baumit Jablonec	0	(0)
2016	FK Varnsdorf	7	(0)
2016–2017	FC Dynamo Saint Petersburg	0	(0)
2017	FC Spartak Kostroma	17	(0)
2018	FC Khimki	6	(0)
2018	FC Znamya Truda Orekhovo-Zuyevo	6	(1)
2019–2020	FC Tambov	0	(0)
2020	→ FC Zvezda St. Petersburg (loan)	0	(0)
2020–2025	FC Leningradets Leningrad Oblast	125	(6)
2025–2026	FC Zenit-2 St. Petersburg	8	(0)
2026	FC Dynamo Vologda	6	(0)
- * Club domestic league appearances and goals as of 21 June 2026

Andrei Denisovich Yakovlev (Russian: Андрей Денисович Яковлев; born 12 January 1995) is a Russian football player.

== Club career ==
He represented FC Zenit Saint Petersburg in the 2013–14 UEFA Youth League.

He made his debut in the Russian Professional Football League for FC Zenit-2 Saint Petersburg on 30 April 2015 in a game against FC Pskov-747.

He signed a 3-year-contract with FK Baumit Jablonec in June 2015.

He made his Russian Football National League debut for FC Khimki on 10 March 2018 in a game against FC Shinnik Yaroslavl.
