= Andrei Ivanov (footballer, born 1994) =

Russian footballer

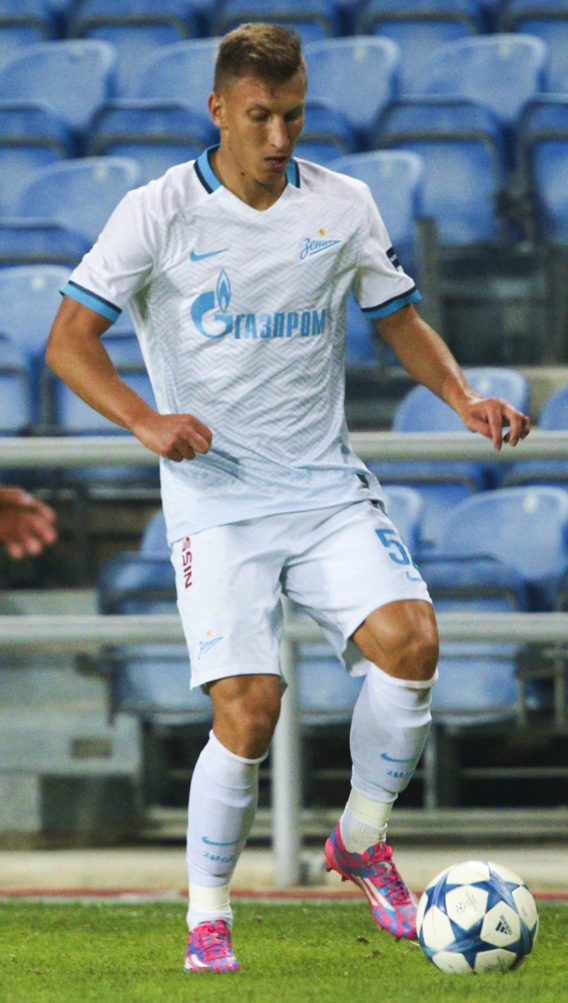
- Ivanov with Zenit in 2016

Personal information
- Full name: Andrei Gennadyevich Ivanov
- Date of birth: 2 September 1994 (age 32)
- Place of birth: Saint Petersburg, Russia
- Height: 1.83 m (6 ft 0 in)
- Position: Defender

Youth career
- Zenit Saint Petersburg

Senior career*
Years	Team	Apps	(Gls)
2012–2017	Zenit Saint Petersburg	1	(0)
2013–2016	→ Zenit-2 Saint Petersburg	74	(1)
2016–2017	→ Mordovia Saransk (loan)	20	(1)
2017–2018	Tom Tomsk	33	(0)
2018–2019	Shinnik Yaroslavl	21	(0)
2019	Gomel	12	(0)
2020	Tom Tomsk	10	(0)
2021	Olimp-Dolgoprudny	10	(0)
2021–2023	Zvezda Saint Petersburg	39	(0)
2023	Aluston-YUBK Alushta		
2023–2024	Sevastopol	35	(1)
2025	Rubin Yalta	11	(0)

International career
2011	Russia U-17	4	(0)
2012	Russia U-18	3	(0)
2013	Russia U-19	1	(0)
- * Club domestic league appearances and goals as of 25 June 2025

Andrei Gennadyevich Ivanov (Russian: Андрей Геннадьевич Иванов; born 2 September 1994) is a Russian football player.

== Club career ==
He made his professional debut in the Russian Professional Football League for FC Zenit-2 St. Petersburg on 15 July 2013 in a game against FC Tosno.

He made his Russian Premier League debut for FC Zenit St. Petersburg on 11 May 2016 in a game against FC Mordovia Saransk.
