= Kirill Kostin =

Russian footballer

Personal information
- Full name: Kirill Alekseyevich Kostin
- Date of birth: 25 March 1994 (age 32)
- Place of birth: Saint Petersburg, Russia
- Height: 1.68 m (5 ft 6 in)
- Position: Right back

Team information
- Current team: Zenit St. Petersburg (fitness coach)

Youth career
- Zenit Saint Petersburg

Senior career*
Years	Team	Apps	(Gls)
2013–2015	Zenit-2 St. Petersburg	60	(5)
2015–2016	União de Leiria	28	(0)
2016–2017	Zenit-2 St. Petersburg	15	(0)
2017–2018	Dynamo St. Petersburg	12	(0)
2019–2020	Chelyabinsk	3	(0)

International career
2009	Russia U15	2	(0)
2010–2011	Russia U17	8	(0)
2011–2012	Russia U18	10	(0)
2012	Russia U19	3	(0)
2015	Russia U21	3	(1)

Managerial career
- 2020–2023: Zenit St. Petersburg (academy fitness coach)
- 2023: Zenit-2 St. Petersburg (fitness coach)
- 2023–2024: Zenit St. Petersburg (U19 fitness coach)
- 2025–2026: Zenit-2 St. Petersburg (fitness coach)
- 2026–: Zenit St. Petersburg (fitness coach)
- * Club domestic league appearances and goals

Kirill Alekseyevich Kostin (Russian: Кирилл Алексеевич Костин; born 25 March 1994) is a Russian football coach and a former player. He is a fitness coach with Zenit St. Petersburg.

== Club career ==
He made his professional debut in the Russian Professional Football League for FC Zenit-2 St. Petersburg on 15 July 2013 in a game against FC Tosno. He made his Russian Football National League debut for Zenit-2 on 31 July 2016 in a game against FC Dynamo Moscow.
