= Ivan Solovyov =

Russian footballer (born 1993)

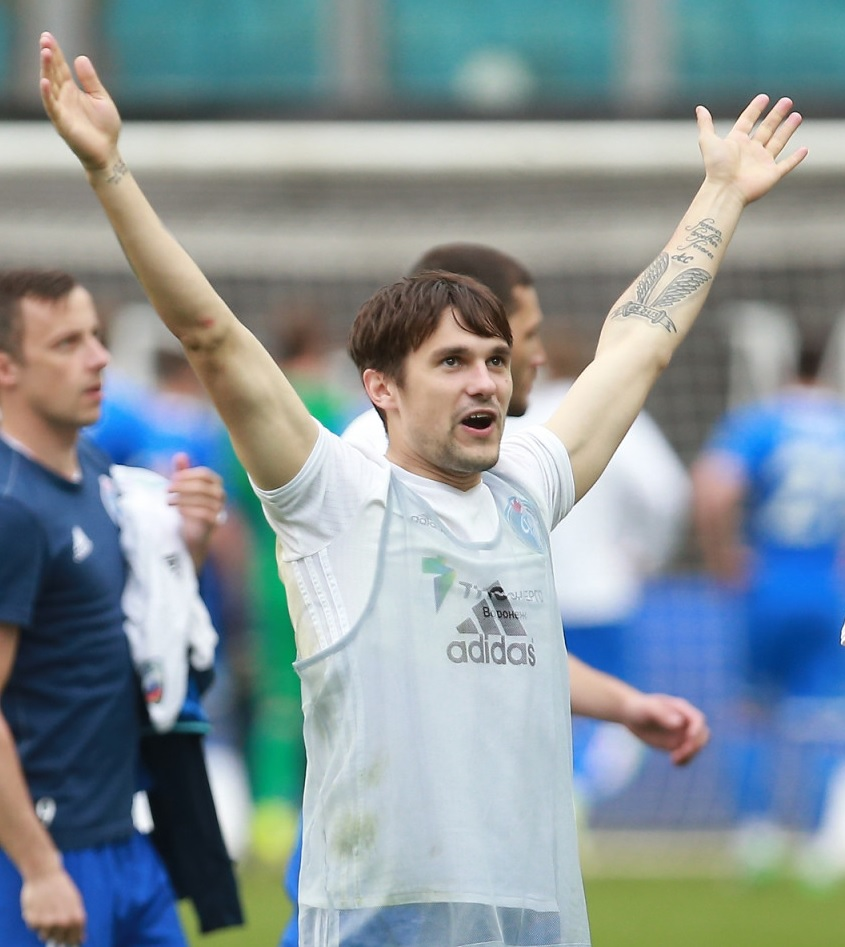
- Solovyov with Fakel in 2017

Personal information
- Full name: Ivan Vladimirovich Solovyov
- Date of birth: 29 March 1993 (age 33)
- Place of birth: Kaluga, Russia
- Height: 1.68 m (5 ft 6 in)
- Position: Midfielder

Team information
- Current team: Dynamo Bryansk
- Number: 9

Youth career
- Dynamo Moscow

Senior career*
Years	Team	Apps	(Gls)
2012–2013	Dynamo Moscow	12	(1)
2013–2016	Zenit Saint Petersburg	1	(0)
2013	→ Zenit-2 Saint Petersburg	1	(0)
2014	→ Amkar Perm (loan)	3	(0)
2014–2015	→ Zenit-2 Saint Petersburg	3	(0)
2016	→ Lahti (loan)	12	(0)
2016–2017	Fakel Voronezh	20	(0)
2017–2018	Dynamo Saint Petersburg	25	(1)
2018	Sochi	22	(2)
2019–2021	Navbahor Namangan	70	(6)
2022	Nasaf	20	(3)
2023	Lokomotiv Tashkent	18	(2)
2024	Muras United	13	(1)
2025	Bishkek City	13	(0)
2025–	Dynamo Bryansk	42	(4)

International career
2011	Russia U18	5	(1)
2011	Russia U19	4	(0)
2012	Russia U21	3	(0)
- * Club domestic league appearances and goals as of 15 November 2026

Ivan Vladimirovich Solovyov (Russian: Иван Владимирович Соловьёв; born 29 March 1993) is a Russian professional football player who plays for Dynamo Bryansk.

== Club career ==
On 31 October 2012, he played his first game for the main Dynamo Moscow squad, setting up a winning goal in a 2-1 victory over Khimki in the 2012–13 Russian Cup Round of 16 game.

He made his debut in the Russian Premier League on 4 November 2012 for Dynamo Moscow in a game against Krasnodar. On the next matchday on 10 November 2012, he started the game for the first time in a match against Alania Vladikavkaz.

He joined Zenit on 1 August 2013, after his contract with Dynamo ended.

== Honours ==
Zenit Saint Petersburg

- Russian Premier League: 2014–15
