= Konstantin Troyanov =

Russian footballer

Personal information
- Full name: Konstantin Leonidovich Troyanov
- Date of birth: 18 November 1995 (age 30)
- Place of birth: Saint Petersburg, Russia
- Height: 1.86 m (6 ft 1 in)
- Position: Defensive midfielder

Team information
- Current team: Ufa
- Number: 79

Youth career
- 2003–2004: Severny press-Baltika Saint Petersburg
- 2004–2010: Zenit Saint Petersburg
- 2011–2012: DYuSSh Kolomyagi Saint Petersburg
- 2013: Zenit Saint Petersburg

Senior career*
Years	Team	Apps	(Gls)
2013–2015	Zenit-2 Saint Petersburg	48	(0)
2015	Zenit Saint Petersburg	0	(0)
2016–2018	Shinnik Yaroslavl	9	(0)
2017–2018	→ Chayka Peschanokopskoye (loan)	25	(0)
2018–2019	Torpedo Moscow	18	(0)
2019–2021	Leningradets Leningrad Oblast	15	(1)
2021–2022	Zvezda Saint Petersburg	26	(1)
2022–2023	Zenit-2 Saint Petersburg	25	(1)
2023–	Ufa	60	(1)
- * Club domestic league appearances and goals as of 16 May 2026

Konstantin Leonidovich Troyanov (Russian: Константин Леонидович Троянов; born 18 November 1995) is a Russian football player who plays as a defensive midfielder for Ufa.

== Club career ==
He made his professional debut in the Russian Professional Football League for Zenit-2 Saint Petersburg on 18 July 2013 in a game against Pskov-747.

He made his debut for the main squad of Zenit Saint Petersburg on 9 December 2015 in the 2015–16 UEFA Champions League group stage game against Gent.

== Career statistics ==
As of 8 June 2024

Club	Season	League			Cup		Continental		Other		Total	
Club	Season	Division	Apps	Goals	Apps	Goals	Apps	Goals	Apps	Goals	Apps	Goals
Zenit-2 Saint Petersburg	2013–14	Russian Second League	9	0	–		–		–		9	0
Zenit-2 Saint Petersburg	2014–15	Russian Second League	24	0	–		–		–		24	0
Zenit-2 Saint Petersburg	2015–16	Russian First League	15	0	–		–		–		15	0
Zenit-2 Saint Petersburg	Total		48	0	0	0	0	0	0	0	48	0
Zenit Saint Petersburg	2015–16	Russian Premier League	0	0	0	0	1 (Note: Appearance in the UEFA Champions League)	0	0	0	1	0
Shinnik Yaroslavl	2016–17	Russian First League	9	0	2	0	–		2 (Note: Appearances in the FNL Cup)	0	13	0
Shinnik Yaroslavl	2017–18	Russian First League	0	0	–		–		–		0	0
Shinnik Yaroslavl	Total		9	0	2	0	0	0	2	0	13	0
Chayka (loan)	2017–18	Russian Second League	25	0	–		–		4	0	29	0
Torpedo Moscow	2018–19	Russian Second League	18	0	3	0	–		–		21	0
Leningradets	2019–20	Russian Second League	0	0	0	0	–		–		0	0
Leningradets	2020–21	Russian Second League	15	1	2	0	–		–		17	1
Leningradets	Total		15	1	2	0	0	0	0	0	17	1
Zvezda Saint Petersburg	2021–22	Russian Second League	26	1	2	0	–		–		28	1
Zenit-2 Saint Petersburg	2022–23	Russian Second League	25	1	–		–		–		25	1
Ufa	2023–24	Russian Second League A	27	1	4	1	–		–		31	2
Ufa	2024–25	Russian First League	9	0	0	0	–		–		9	0
Ufa	2025–26	Russian First League	24	0	2	0	–		–		26	0
Ufa	Total		60	1	6	1	0	0	0	0	66	2
Career total			226	4	15	1	1	0	6	0	248	5
