= Ilya Zuyev =

Russian footballer

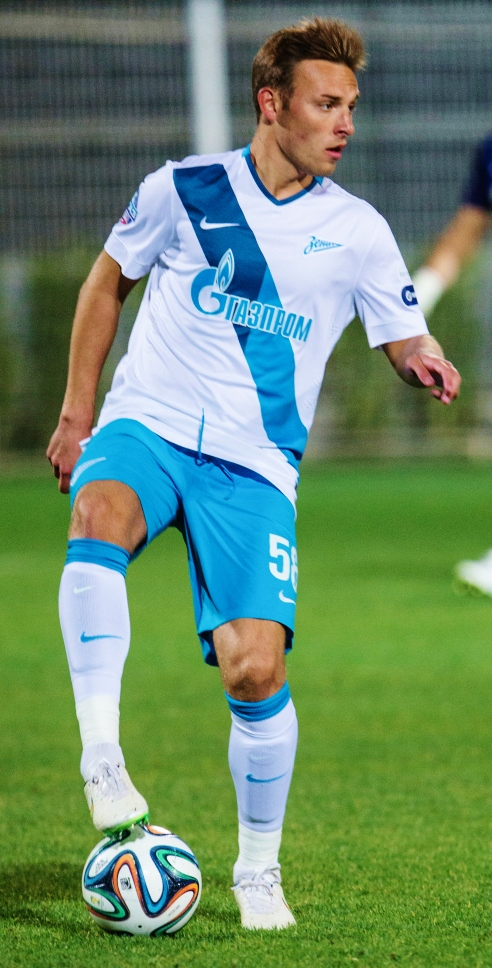

Personal information
- Full name: Ilya Konstantinovich Zuyev
- Date of birth: 25 January 1994 (age 32)
- Place of birth: St. Petersburg, Russia
- Height: 1.83 m (6 ft 0 in)
- Position: Defender

Team information
- Current team: FC Volgar Astrakhan
- Number: 58

Youth career
- FC Zenit Saint Petersburg

Senior career*
Years	Team	Apps	(Gls)
2011–2018	FC Zenit Saint Petersburg	0	(0)
2013	→ FC Tom Tomsk (loan)	0	(0)
2013–2018	→ FC Zenit-2 Saint Petersburg	151	(20)
2018–2019	FC Urozhay Krasnodar	6	(0)
2019–2020	FC Nizhny Novgorod	8	(0)
2020–2021	FC Tom Tomsk	33	(0)
2021–2023	FC Akron Tolyatti	67	(3)
2023–	FC Volgar Astrakhan	104	(7)

International career^{‡}
2011	Russia U-17	6	(0)
2011–2012	Russia U-18	10	(1)
2012–2013	Russia U-19	9	(1)
2013–2016	Russia U-21	35	(2)
- * Club domestic league appearances and goals as of 15 November 2026 ‡ National team caps and goals as of 11 October 2016

Ilya Konstantinovich Zuyev (Russian: Илья Константинович Зуев; born 25 January 1994) is a Russian football player who plays for FC Volgar Astrakhan.

== Club career ==
He made his professional debut in the Russian Professional Football League for FC Zenit-2 St. Petersburg on 4 August 2013 in a game against FC Torpedo Vladimir.

He made his Russian Football National League debut for Zenit-2 on 12 July 2015 in a game against FC Torpedo Armavir.
