= Ilya Kubyshkin =

Russian footballer

Personal information
- Full name: Ilya Anatolyevich Kubyshkin
- Date of birth: 12 January 1996 (age 30)
- Place of birth: Saint Petersburg, Russia
- Height: 1.83 m (6 ft 0 in)
- Positions: Midfielder; defender

Team information
- Current team: Dynamo St. Petersburg
- Number: 13

Youth career
- –2008: Kirovets St. Petersburg
- 2009–2016: Zenit St. Petersburg

Senior career*
Years	Team	Apps	(Gls)
2016	Zenit-2 St. Petersburg	3	(0)
2016–2018	Slovan Liberec	2	(0)
2018–2019	Avangard Kursk	43	(1)
2020	Neftekhimik Nizhnekamsk	4	(1)
2021	SKA Rostov-on-Don	10	(0)
2021–2022	Tom Tomsk	33	(4)
2022–2023	Kuban Krasnodar	3	(0)
2023	Volga Ulyanovsk	9	(1)
2023–2024	Spartak Kostroma	26	(1)
2024	Kompozit Pavlovsky Posad	13	(1)
2025	Znamya Truda	17	(3)
2026–	Dynamo St. Petersburg	14	(0)

International career
2011	Russia U-16	5	(1)
- * Club domestic league appearances and goals as of 1 November 2026

Ilya Anatolyevich Kubyshkin (Russian: Илья Анатольевич Кубышкин; born 12 January 1996) is a Russian football player who plays for Dynamo St. Petersburg.

== Club career ==
He made his debut in the Russian Football National League for Zenit-2 St. Petersburg on 27 March 2016 in a game against Luch-Energiya Vladivostok.
