= North-West Football Championship =

North-West Football Championship (Russian: Первенство Северо-Запада по футболу) is the north-west regional competition of Russian Amateur Football League, the fourth overall tier of the Russian football league system.

Since 2022, the Saint Petersburg Championship has received the status of Amateur Football League, and teams do not participate in the North-West Football Championship.

== Competing regions ==
Teams from the following regions can take part in the tournament:

- Saint Petersburg
- Republic of Karelia
- Komi Republic
- Arkhangelsk Oblast
- Murmansk Oblast
- Kaliningrad Oblast
- Leningrad Oblast
- Novgorod Oblast
- Pskov Oblast
- Nenets Autonomous Okrug

== The winners ==
=== The winners of the Championship ===
- 1996 — Metallurg (Pikalyovo)
- 1997 — Khimik-Pogranichnik (Slantsy)
- 1998 — Oasis (Yartsevo)
- 1999 — Pskov (Pskov)
- 2000 — Svetogorets (Svetogorsk)
- 2001 — Kondopoga (Kondopoga)
- 2002 — Pikalyovo (Pikalyovo)
- 2003 — Baltika-Tarko (Kaliningrad)
- 2004 — Lokomotiv (Saint Petersburg)
- 2005 — Baltika-2 (Kaliningrad)
- 2006 — Apatit (Kirovsk)
- 2007 — Sever (Murmansk)
- 2008 — Torpedo-Piter (Saint Petersburg)
- 2009 — Apatit (Kirovsk)
- 2010 — Khimik (Koryazhma)
- 2011/2012 — Rus (Saint Petersburg)
- 2012/2013 — Trevis and VVK (Saint Petersburg)
- 2013 — Trevis and VVK (Saint Petersburg)
- 2014 — Karelia (Petrozavodsk)
- 2015 — Zvezda (Saint Petersburg)
- 2016 — Zvezda (Saint Petersburg)
- 2017 — Zvezda (Saint Petersburg)
- 2018 — Khimik (Koryazhma)
- 2019 — FC Market Sveta (Saint Petersburg)
- 2020 — Dynamo (Saint Petersburg)
- 2021 — Yadro (Saint Petersburg)
- 2022 — Sever (Murmansk)
- 2023 — Sever (Murmansk)
- 2024 — Sever (Murmansk)
- 2025 — FC Tosno (Tosno)

=== The winners of the Cup ===
- 1997 — Khimik-Pogranichnik (Slantsy)
- 1999 — Pskov (Pskov)
- 2000 — Dynamo-Stroyimpuls (Saint Petersburg)
- 2001 — Tarko (Kaliningrad)
- 2002 — Tarko (Kaliningrad)
- 2003 — Baltika-Tarko (Kaliningrad)
- 2004 — Luki-SKIF (Velikiye Luki)
- 2005 — Baltika-2 (Kaliningrad)
- 2006 — Sever (Murmansk)
- 2007 — Pskov-747 (Pskov)
- 2008 — Apatit (Kirovsk)
- 2009 — Baltika-M (Kaliningrad)
- 2010 — Karelia-Discovery (Petrozavodsk)
- 2011 — Apatit (Kirovsk)
- 2012/2013 — Trevis and VVK (Saint Petersburg)
- 2014 — Karelia (Petrozavodsk)
- 2015 — Zvezda (Saint Petersburg)
- 2016 — Zvezda (Saint Petersburg)
- 2017 — Avtofavorit (Pskov)
- 2018 — Zvezda (Saint Petersburg)
- 2019 — Dynamo (Saint Petersburg)
- 2020 — Pskov (Pskov)
- 2021 — Pskov (Pskov)
- 2022 — Sever (Murmansk)
- 2023 — S.Sh. Leningradets (Gatchina)
- 2024 — Sever (Murmansk)
- 2025 — S.Sh. Leningradets (Gatchina)
