= 2002–03 Russian Cup =

Tournament details
- Country: Russia

Final positions
- Champions: Spartak Moscow
- Runners-up: FC Rostov

The 2002–03 Russian Cup was the 11th season of the Russian football knockout tournament since the dissolution of Soviet Union.

The tournament was won by Spartak Moscow who beat FC Rostov in the final with 1–0.

== First round ==
Team 1	Score	Team 2
23 March 2002
Nemkom Krasnodar	3–0 (a.e.t.) (Note: In the match between Nemkom Krasnodar and Shakhtyor Shakhty, despite the score being 1–0 in the 98th minute, referee Kislichenko did not apply the golden goal rule and allowed the game to continue until the end of extra time. Since Nemkom won 3–0 in the end, there was neither an appeal nor a replay.)	Shakhtyor Shakhty
Sudostroitel Astrakhan	0–0 (a.e.t.) (3–4 p)	Dynamo Makhachkala
Spartak-Kavkaztransgaz Izobilny	1–2	Dynamo Stavropol
Spartak Anapa	0–1	Vityaz Krymsk
Slavyansk Slavyansk-na-Kubani	0–1	FC Krasnodar-2000
Kavkazkabel Prokhladny	3–1	Zhemchuzhina Budyonnovsk
Venets Gulkevichi	0–2	Nart Cherkessk
Druzhba Maykop	4–1	Zhemchuzhina Sochi
Avtodor Vladikavkaz	6–0	FC Mozdok
Angusht Nazran	0–1	Terek Grozny
16 April 2002
Spartak Yoshkar-Ola	0–0 (a.e.t.) (2–3 p)	Diana Volzhsk
Khopyor Balashov	1–0 (a.e.t.)	Iskra Engels
FC Balakovo	1–1 (a.e.t.) (3–4 p)	Zenit Penza
Elektronika Nizhny Novgorod	1–0 (a.e.t.)	Torpedo Pavlovo
Biokhimik-Mordovia Saransk	0–1 (a.e.t.)	Metallurg Vyksa
Torpedo Volzhsky	0–5	Olimpia Volgograd
Sibur-Khimik Dzerzhinsk	w/o	Lokomotiv Nizhny Novgorod
Lada-Energiya Dimitrovgrad	0–1	Volga Ulyanovsk
18 April 2002
Titan Reutov	1–0 (a.e.t.)	Kosmos Elektrostal
Spartak Tambov	2–1	Lokomotiv Liski
Mostransgaz Gazoprovod	1–2	Vityaz Podolsk
Fabus Bronnitsy	3–1	Spartak-Orekhovo
Dynamo Bryansk	0–0 (a.e.t.) (7–8 p)	FC Oryol
Don Novomoskovsk	0–1	Ryazan-Agrokomplekt
Volochanin-89 Vyshny Volochyok	1–2	FC Pskov-2000
Svetogorets Svetogorsk	4–0	Zenit-2 Saint Petersburg
Spartak Lukhovitsy	3–1	FC Kolomna
Spartak Kostroma	2–1	Spartak-Telekom Shuya
Neftyanik Yaroslavl	1–1 (a.e.t.) (2–3 p)	Dynamo Vologda
Metallurg Lipetsk	3–1	FC Yelets
Lokomotiv Kaluga	1–0	Arsenal-2 Tula
Arsenal Tula	3–0	Spartak Shchyolkovo
FC Rybinsk	0–2	Severstal Cherepovets
FC Krasnoznamensk	1–0	Sportakademklub Moscow
BSK Spirovo	1–0	Uralan Plus Moscow
Baltika Kaliningrad	1–0	Mosenergo Moscow
Avangard Kursk	1–2	Salyut-Energiya Belgorod
Avtomobilist Noginsk	2–1	Torpedo Vladimir
24 April 2002
Gazovik Orenburg	1–0	Nosta Novotroitsk
Energiya Chaykovsky	1–0	Dynamo Izhevsk
Dynamo Perm	3–0	Dynamo-Maschinostroitel Kirow
Zenit Chelyabinsk	1–0	Stroitel Ufa
Uralmash Yekaterinburg	w/o	FC Berezniki
Sodovik Sterlitamak	2–0	Metallurg-Metisnik Magnitogorsk
Lukoil Chelyabinsk	1–0	Uralets Nizhny Tagil
KAMAZ Naberezhnye Chelny	1–0	Alnas Almetyevsk
27 April 2002
Alttrak Rubtsovsk	1–1 (a.e.t.) (4–5 p)	Dynamo Barnaul
Selenga Ulan-Ude	1–2	Zvezda Irkutsk
Okean Nakhodka	0–0 (a.e.t.) (5–4 p)	Luch Vladivostok
Metallurg-Zabsib Novokuznetsk	3–1	Shakhtyor Prokopyevsk
Chkalovets-1936 Novosibirsk	1–0	Kuzbass-Dynamo Kemerevo
Irtysh Omsk	1–2 (a.e.t.)	FC Tyumen
30 April 2002
Chkalovets-Olimpik Novosibirsk	2–1	Sibiryak Bratsk
Amur Blagoveshchensk	1–1 (a.e.t.) (4–5 p)	Smena Komsomolsk-na-Amure

== Second round ==
Team 1	Score	Team 2
5 April 2002
Vityaz Krymsk	0–1 (a.e.t.)	Druzhba Maykop
Terek Grozny	0–0 (a.e.t.) (4–5 p)	Kavkazkabel Prokhladny
Nart Cherkessk	0–2	Avtodor Vladikavkaz
FC Krasnodar-2000	1–0	Nemkom Krasnodar
Dynamo Stavropol	0–0 (a.e.t.) (3–4 p)	Dynamo Makhachkala
29 April 2002
Olimpia Volgograd	3–1	Khopyor Balashov
Metallurg Vyksa	0–0 (a.e.t.) (4–5 p)	Svetotekhnika Saransk
Elektronika Nizhny Novgorod	1–1 (a.e.t.) (4–5 p)	Sibur-Khimik Dzerzhinsk
Diana Volzhsk	0–1	Energetik Uren
Volga Ulyanovsk	2–1	Zenit Penza
30 April 2002
Vityaz Podolsk	3–2	Titan Reutov
Ryazan-Agrokomplekt	1–0	Lokomotiv Kaluga
Fabus Bronnitsy	0–1	Spartak Lukhovitsy
Spartak Kostroma	1–1 (a.e.t.) (6–7 p)	Avtomobilist Noginsk
Severstal Cherepovets	1–2 (a.e.t.)	Dynamo Vologda
FC Pskov-2000	2–1	Svetogorets Svetogorsk
Metallurg Lipetsk	2–1 (a.e.t.)	Spartak Tambov
FC Krasnoznamensk	3–0	Arsenal Tula
BSK Spirovo	0–0 (a.e.t.) (3–4 p)	Baltika Kaliningrad
Salyut-Energiya Belgorod	1–0	FC Oryol
7 May 2002
Gazovik Orenburg	1–1 (a.e.t.) (5–4 p)	Sodovik Sterlitamak
Dynamo Perm	2–5	Uralmash Yekaterinburg
Lukoil Chelyabinsk	2–0	Zenit Chelyabinsk
KAMAZ Naberezhnye Chelny	1–0	Energiya Chaykovsky
8 May 2002
Smena Komsomolsk-na-Amure	1–0	Okean Nakhodka
Zvezda Irkutsk	1–0	Chkalovets-Olimpik Novosibirsk
FC Tyumen	0–1	Chkalovets-1936 Novosibirsk
Dynamo Barnaul	1–0	Metallurg-Zabsib Novokuznetsk

== Third round ==
Team 1	Score	Team 2
19 May 2002
Vityaz Podolsk	2–2 (a.e.t.) (2–4 p)	FC Krasnoznamensk
Ryazan-Agrokomplekt	2–1	Spartak Lukhovitsy
FC Pskov-2000	2–1	Baltika Kaliningrad
Dynamo Vologda	0–1	Avtomobilist Noginsk
20 May 2002
Gazovik Orenburg	1–2	Lukoil Chelyabinsk
Salyut-Energiya Belgorod	0–2	Metallurg Lipetsk
Uralmash Yekaterinburg	1–0 (a.e.t.)	KAMAZ Naberezhnye Chelny
22 May 2002
Kavkazkabel Prokhladny	1–2	Avtodor Vladikavkaz
Svetotekhnika Saransk	3–1	Volga Ulyanovsk
Energetik Uren	2–0	Sibur-Khimik Dzerzhinsk
Dynamo Makhachkala	3–1	Olimpia Volgograd
Druzhba Maykop	1–2	FC Krasnodar-2000
28 May 2002
Smena Komsomolsk-na-Amure	3–1	Zvezda Irkutsk
29 May 2002
Dynamo Barnaul	1–2	Chkalovets-1936 Novosibirsk

== Fourth round ==
Team 1	Score	Team 2
14 June 2002
Rubin Kazan	3–1	Neftekhimik Nizhnekamsk
15 June 2002
Smena Komsomolsk-na-Amure	0–2	Amkar Perm
FC Krasnoznamensk	1–5	Dynamo Saint Petersburg
FC Krasnodar-2000	1–3	Chernomorets Novorossiysk
Volgar-Gasprom Astrakhan	0–1	Kuban Krasnodar
Tom Tomsk	2–0	Metallurg Krasnoyarsk
Svetotekhnika Saransk	3–3 (a.e.t.) (1–3 p)	Energetik Uren
FC Pskov-2000	1–2	Kristall Smolensk
Lukoil Chelyabinsk	2–2 (a.e.t.) (1–3 p)	Uralmash Yekaterinburg
Lada-Tolyatti	2–1	Fakel Voronezh
Gazovik-Gasprom Izhevsk	2–6	SKA-Energiya Khabarovsk
Dynamo Makhachkala	1–0	SKA Rostov-on-Don
Chkalovets-1936 Novosibirsk	2–0	Lokomotiv Chita
Avtomobilist Noginsk	0–1 (a.e.t.)	FC Khimki
Avtodor Vladikavkaz	0–0 (a.e.t.) (3–5 p)	Spartak Nalchik
19 June 2002
Metallurg Lipetsk	3–0	Ryazan-Agrokomplekt

== Round of 32 ==
Team 1	Score	Team 2
29 June 2002
Chkalovets-1936 Novosibirsk	0–4	Spartak Moscow
14 September 2002
FC Khimki	1–0	Torpedo Moscow
Tom Tomsk	2–2 (a.e.t.) (4–2 p)	Rotor Volgograd
Metallurg Lipetsk	2–1	Shinnik Yaroslavl
Energetik Uren	0–2	Saturn-REN TV
Dynamo Saint Petersburg	3–2 (a.e.t.)	CSKA Moscow
Spartak Nalchik	2–0	Dynamo Moscow
Kuban Krasnodar	1–2	Anzhi Makhachkala
SKA-Energiya Khabarovsk	0–1	Sokol Saratov
Chernomorets Novorossiysk	0–1	Krylia Sovetov Samara
Uralmash Yekaterinburg	1–2	Zenit Saint Petersburg
Rubin Kazan	1–0	Alania Vladikavkaz
Kristall Smolensk	2–3	Rostselmash Rostov
Amkar Perm	1–3	Uralan Elista
Lada-Tolyatti	6–0	Torpedo-ZIL Moscow
29 November 2002
Dynamo Makhachkala	1–2 (a.e.t.)	Lokomotiv Moscow

== Round of 16 ==
Team 1	Score	Team 2
19 October 2002
Spartak Moscow	4–0	Uralan Elista
Tom Tomsk	0–1	Sokol Saratov
Spartak Nalchik	0–1	Krylia Sovetov Samara
Metallurg Lipetsk	0–4	FC Khimki
Dynamo Saint Petersburg	2–3	Rostselmash Rostov
Lada-Tolyatti	3–2 (a.e.t.)	Zenit Saint Petersburg
Rubin Kazan	0–1	Saturn-REN TV
Anzhi Makhachkala	1–0	Lokomotiv Moscow

== Quarter-finals ==
Team 1	Score	Team 2
19 March 2003
Anzhi Makhachkala	1–1 (a.e.t.) (4–2 p)	Krylia Sovetov Samara
Lada-Tolyatti	0–0 (a.e.t.) (3–2 p)	Saturn-REN TV
Sokol Saratov	0–1	Spartak Moscow
FC Khimki	0–1	FC Rostov (Note: On 5 January 2003, Rostselmash Rostov was changed their name to FC Rostov.)

== Semi-finals ==
Team 1	Score	Team 2
21 May 2003
Anzhi Makhachkala	0–1	FC Rostov
Lada-Tolyatti	2–3 (a.e.t.)	Spartak Moscow

== Final ==
15 June 2003
15:00 UTC+4

Spartak Moscow	1–0	Rostov
Titov 28'	Report

Lokomotiv Stadium, Moscow
Attendance: 25,000
Referee: Igor Egorov (Nizhny Novgorod)
