= 2003–04 Russian Cup =

Tournament details
- Country: Russia

Final positions
- Champions: Terek Grozny
- Runners-up: Krylia Sovetov Samara

The 2003–04 Russian Cup was the 12th season of the Russian football knockout tournament since the dissolution of Soviet Union.

The tournament was won by Terek Grozny who beat Krylia Sovetov Samara in the final with 1–0.

== Preliminary round ==
Team 1	Score	Team 2
22 March 2003
Zhemchuzhina Sochi	2–2 (a.e.t.) (3–1 p)	Spartak Anapa
Zhemchuzhina Budyonnovsk	0–1 (a.e.t.)	Angusht Nazran
Kavkazkabel Prokhladny	0–1	Avtodor Vladikavkaz
Slavyansk Slavyansk-na-Kubani	2–1	Vityaz Krymsk
19 April 2003
Zenit Penza	2–1	Biokhimik-Mordovia Saransk
Titan Moscow	1–2 (a.e.t.)	Vityaz Podolsk
Tekstilshchik Ivanovo	0–1	Spartak-Telekom Shuya
Kosmos Elektrostal	2–4 (a.e.t.)	Znamya Truda Orekhovo-Zuyevo
Iskra Engels	1–3 (a.e.t.)	Spartak Tambov
FC Reutov	2–1	Torpedo Vladimir
FC Pikalevo	1–2	Severstal Cherepovets
Dynamo Vologda	2–0	Spartak Kostroma
20 April 2003
Volga Ulyanovsk	2–0	Torpedo Volzhsky
Stroitel Ufa	1–2	Alnas Almetyevsk
Spartak Yoshkar-Ola	2–1	Lada-SOK Dimitrovgrad
KAMAZ Naberezhnye Chelny	3–0	Dynamo Izhevsk

== First round ==
Team 1	Score	Team 2
14 April 2003
FC Krasnodar-2000	5–0	Druzhba Maykop
15 April 2003
Sudostroitel Astrakhan	0–3	Dynamo Makhachkala
Slavyansk Slavyansk-na-Kubani	5–1	Zhemchuzhina Sochi
Shakhtyor Shakhty	2–1	SKA Rostov-on-Don
Olimpia Volgograd	1–2	Tekstilshchik Kamyshin
Mashuk-KMV Pyatigorsk	3–1	Nart Tscherkessk
Dynamo Stavropol	1–0	Spartak-Kavkaztransgaz Izobilny
Avtodor Vladikavkaz	4–0	Angusht Nazran
30 April 2003
Zvezda Irkutsk	4–0	Selenga Ulan-Ude
Znamya Truda Orekhovo-Zuyevo	0–2	Vityaz Podolsk
Volochanin-Ratmir VV	1–0	BSK Spirovo
Uralan Plus Moscow	0–1	Mosenergo Moscow
Torpedo Pavlovo	3–2	Metallurg Vyksa
Svetogorets Svetogorsk	2–0	Zenit-2 Saint Petersburg
Sportakademklub Moscow	1–0	FC Vidnoye
Spartak-Telekom Shuya	2–0	FC Reutov
Spartak Tambov	0–0 (a.e.t.) (5–3 p)	Zenit Penza
Spartak Shchyolkovo	1–3	Arsenal Tula
Spartak Lukhovitsy	1–0	Ryazan-Agrokomplekt
Smena Komsomolsk-na-Amure	2–2 (a.e.t.) (4–2 p)	Amur Blagoveshchensk
Sibiryak Bratsk	1–1 (a.e.t.) (3–4 p)	Metallurg Krasnoyarsk
Severstal Cherepovets	0–0 (a.e.t.) (4–2 p)	Dynamo Vologda
FC Pskow-2000	2–0	Petrotrest Saint Petersburg
Okean Nakhodka	2–3	Luch Vladivostok
Lokomotiv Kaluga	3–0	Dynamo Tula
FC Yelets	1–0	Don Novomoskovsk
FC Oryol	2–1	Dynamo Bryansk
Chkalovets-Olimpik Novosibirsk	1–0	Dynamo Barnaul
Avangard Kursk	0–0 (a.e.t.) (1–4 p)	Salyut-Energiya Belgorod
1 May 2003
Chkalovets-1936 Novosibirsk	3–2	Irtysh Omsk
9 May 2003
Tobol Kurgan	2–1	Zenit Chelyabinsk
Spartak Yoshkar-Ola	0–0 (a.e.t.) (1–4 p)	Volga Ulyanovsk
Nosta Novotroitsk	1–6	Gazovik Orenburg
Metallurg-Metisnik Magnitogorsk	0–0 (a.e.t.) (2–0 p)	Sodovik Sterlitamak
Lukoil Chelyabinsk	2–1	Uralets Nizhny Tagil
Energetik Uren	1–0	Elektronika Nizhny Novgorod
Dynamo-Mashinostroitel Kirov	1–1 (a.e.t.) (0–3 p)	Lokomotiv Nizhny Novgorod
Alnas Almetyevsk	0–2	KAMAZ Naberezhnye Chelny

== Second round ==
Team 1	Score	Team 2
10 May 2003
Tekstilshchik Kamyshin	0–3	Dynamo Makhachkala
Shakhtyor Shakhty	1–1 (a.e.t.) (5–4 p)	Slavyansk Slavyansk-na-Kubani
Dynamo Stavropol	5–2	FC Krasnodar-2000
Avtodor Vladikavkaz	3–0	Mashuk-KMV Pyatigorsk
20 May 2003
Vityaz Podolsk	0–1	Spartak Lukhovitsy
Spartak-Telekom Shuya	0–1	Sportakademklub Moscow
Spartak Tambov	0–1	Torpedo Pavlovo
Severstal Cherepovets	2–1	Volochanin-Ratmir VV
Salyut-Energiya Belgorod	0–0 (a.e.t.) (3–1 p)	FC Oryol
FC Pskow-2000	3–1 (a.e.t.)	Svetogorets Svetogorsk
Mosenergo Moscow	1–2	Arsenal Tula
FC Yelets	3–2	Lokomotiv Kaluga
23 May 2003
Shakhtyor Prokopyevsk	w/o	Kuzbass-Dynamo Kemerovo
Metallurg Krasnoyarsk	0–1 (a.e.t.)	Zvezda Irkutsk
Luch-Energiya Vladivostok	1–1 (a.e.t.) (6–5 p)	Smena Komsomolsk-na-Amure
Chkalovets-1936 Novosibirsk	0–0 (a.e.t.) (6–7 p)	Chkalovets-Olimpik Novosibirsk
7 June 2003
Lukoil Chelyabinsk	2–1	Tobol Kurgan
Lokomotiv Nizhny Novgorod	3–0	Energetik Uren
KAMAZ Naberezhnye Chelny	5–0	Spartak Yoshkar-Ola
Gazovik Orenburg	0–0 (a.e.t.) (3–5 p)	Metallurg-Metisnik Magnitogorsk

== Third round ==
Team 1	Score	Team 2
4 June 2003
Dynamo Stavropol	3–1	Shakhtyor Shakhty
Dynamo Makhachkala	2–0	Avtodor Vladikavkaz
15 June 2003
Zvezda Irkutsk	2–0	Luch-Energiya Vladivostok
Chkalovets-Olimpik Novosibirsk	1–0	Shakhtyor Prokopyevsk
18 June 2003
Torpedo Pavlovo	0–1	Spartak Lukhovitsy
Severstal Cherepovets	2–1	FC Pskow-2000
Salyut-Energiya Belgorod	3–3 (a.e.t.) (4–5 p)	FC Yelets
Arsenal Tula	1–0	Sportakademklub Moscow
27 June 2003
Metallurg-Metisnik Magnitogorsk	0–1	Lukoil Chelyabinsk
Lokomotiv Nizhny Novgorod	0–1	KAMAZ Naberezhnye Chelny

== Fourth round ==
Team 1	Score	Team 2
24 August 2003
Zvezda Irkutsk	3–0	SKA-Energiya Khabarovsk
Ural Yekaterinburg	0–1	Tom Tomsk
Spartak Nalchik	1–3	Terek Grozny
Severstal Cherepovets	0–1	FC Khimki
Neftekhimik Nizhnekamsk	0–1	Gazovik-Gazprom Izhevsk
Metallurg Lipetsk	2–0	Fakel Voronezh
Lukoil Chelyabinsk	1–1 (a.e.t.) (3–4 p)	KAMAZ Naberezhnye Chelny
Lokomotiv Chita	2–0	Metallurg-Kuzbass Novokuznetsk
Lisma-Mordovia Saransk	1–3	Lada-Tolyatti
FC Yelets	1–0	Spartak Lukhovitsy
Dynamo Saint Petersburg	0–0 (a.e.t.) (5–4 p)	Baltika Kaliningrad
Dynamo Stavropol	0–1	Kuban Krasnodar
Dynamo Makhachkala	0–1	Volgar-Gazprom Astrakhan
Chkalovets-Olimpik Novosibirsk	0–2	Amkar Perm
Arsenal Tula	1–0	Kristall Smolensk
Anzhi Makhachkala	2–0	Sokol Saratov

== Round of 32 ==
Team 1	Agg.	Team 2	1st leg	2nd leg
Arsenal Tula	4–5	Shinnik Yaroslavl	0–2	4–3
Zvezda Irkutsk	0–6	Saturn-REN TV	0–0	0–6
Terek Grozny	3–1	Chernomorets Novorossiysk	2–0	1–1
Metallurg Lipetsk	2–5	Spartak-Alania Vladikavkaz	1–2	1–3
Lokomotiv Chita	0–1	FC Rostov	0–0	0–1
Lada-Tolyatti	0–1	Uralan Elista	0–0	0–1 (a.e.t.)
KAMAZ Naberezhnye Chelny	2–8	Zenit Saint Petersburg	0–2	2–6
Gazovik-Gazprom Izhevsk	1–6	Krylia Sovetov Samara	0–4	1–2
FC Yelets	2–3	CSKA Moscow	1–0	1–3
Amkar Perm	3–4	Torpedo-Metallurg Moscow	3–2	0–2
Dynamo Saint Petersburg	1–6	Rubin Kazan	0–4	1–2
Dynamo Moscow	7–2	Volgar-Gazprom Astrakhan	5–1	2–1
Anzhi Makhachkala	2–2 (a)	Rotor Volgograd	3–1	0–2
Spartak Moscow	2–3	Kuban Krasnodar	1–2	1–1
Lokomotiv Moscow	5–0	FC Khimki	4–0	1–0
Tom Tomsk	3–1	Torpedo Moscow	3–0	0–1

== Round of 16 ==
Team 1	Agg.	Team 2	1st leg	2nd leg
CSKA Moscow	5–0	Uralan Elista	4–0	1–0
Saturn-REN TV	2–6	FC Rostov	2–2	0–4
Dynamo Moscow	2–5	Rotor Volgograd	2–1	0–4
Krylia Sovetov Samara	1–1 (a)	Zenit Saint Petersburg	0–0	1–1
Tom Tomsk	1–3	Torpedo-Metallurg Moscow	0–0	1–3
Rubin Kazan	1–2	Lokomotiv Moscow	1–1	0–1
Alania Vladikavkaz	1–3	Shinnik Yaroslavl	1–0	0–3 (a.e.t.)
Kuban Krasnodar	1–4	Terek Grozny	0–3	1–1

== Quarter-finals ==
Team 1	Agg.	Team 2	1st leg	2nd leg
Shinnik Yaroslavl	4–4 (a)	Lokomotiv Moscow	3–0	1–4
Rotor Volgograd	2–3	Terek Grozny	2–0	0–3
Krylia Sovetov Samara	3–1	CSKA Moscow	2–1	1–0
FC Rostov	0–3	Torpedo-Metallurg Moscow	0–3	0–0

== Semi-finals ==
Team 1	Agg.	Team 2	1st leg	2nd leg
Terek Grozny	2–1	Shinnik Yaroslavl	0–0	2–1
Torpedo-Metallurg Moscow	2–4	Krylia Sovetov Samara	1–1	1–3 (a.e.t.)

== Final ==
29 May 2004
16:00 UTC+4

Terek Grozny	1–0	Krylia Sovetov Samara
Fedkov 90+2'	Report

Lokomotiv Stadium, Moscow
Attendance: 17,000
Referee: Nikolai Ivanov (Saint Petersburg)
