= Oleg Salnikov =

Russian footballer

Personal information
- Full name: Oleg Nikolayevich Salnikov
- Date of birth: 1 December 1975 (age 50)
- Place of birth: Pikalyovo, Russian SFSR
- Height: 1.80 m (5 ft 11 in)
- Position: Defender

Team information
- Current team: FC Rostov (U-19 assistant)

Senior career*
| Years | Team | Apps | (Gls) |
| 1991 | FC Metallurg Boksitogorsk | | |
| 1991–1993 | FC Metallurg Pikalyovo (D4) | | |
| 1994–1995 | FC Metallurg Pikalyovo | 40 | (0) |
| 1996 | FC Metallurg Pikalyovo (D4) | | |
| 1997–1999 | FC Spartak-Orekhovo Orekhovo-Zuyevo | 49 | (0) |
| 2000–2001 | FC Baltika Kaliningrad | 56 | (1) |
| 2002 | FC Rubin Kazan | 7 | (0) |
| 2002 | FC Pikalyovo (D4) | | |
| 2003–2004 | FC Dynamo Stavropol | 52 | (3) |
| 2005–2008 | FC Volga Nizhny Novgorod | 109 | (3) |
| 2010 | FC Sever Murmansk | 30 | (0) |

Managerial career
- 2020: FC Rostov (U-16)
- 2021–: FC Rostov (U-19 assistant)
- * Club domestic league appearances and goals

Oleg Nikolayevich Salnikov (Russian: Олег Николаевич Сальников; born 1 December 1975) is a Russian professional football coach and a former player. He is an assistant coach for the Under-19 squad of FC Rostov.

== Club career ==
He played 4 seasons in the Russian Football National League for FC Spartak-Orekhovo Orekhovo-Zuyevo, FC Baltika Kaliningrad and FC Rubin Kazan.
