= FC Piter Saint Petersburg =

- Full name: Football Club Piter Saint Petersburg
- Founded: 2011
- Dissolved: 2013
- Ground: MSA Petrovsky
- Capacity: 1211
- Chairman: Aleksei Mikhaylov
- Manager: N/A
- League: Russian Second Division, Zone West
- 2012–13: 14th

FC Piter Saint Petersburg (Russian: «ФК Питер» Санкт Петербург) was a Russian football team from Saint Petersburg. It played in the 2012–13 season of the Russian Second Division and was dissolved after the season due to lack of financing.

== Results ==
Season	Tournament	Results	Notes
2011/12	Russian Amateur Football League, Zone «North-West»	7th	
2012/13	PFL, Zone «West»	14th	▼
2013	Russian Amateur Football League, Zone «North-West»	3th	

FC Piter played in the Russian Cup only once - in the 2012-2013 season. In the 1/256 finals, FC Piter beat FC Rus from St. Petersburg, and in 1/128 - lost to FC Pskov-747.
