= 2015–16 Russian Premier League =

24th season of top-tier football league in Russia

Russian Premier League
- Season: 2015–16
- Champions: CSKA Moscow
- Relegated: Kuban Krasnodar; Dynamo Moscow; Mordovia Saransk
- Champions League: CSKA Moscow; Rostov
- Europa League: Zenit Saint Petersburg; Krasnodar; Spartak Moscow
- Matches: 240
- Goals: 588 (2.45 per match)
- Top goalscorer: Fyodor Smolov (20 goals)
- Biggest home win: CSKA 7–1 Mordovia; Krasnodar 6–0 Ural
- Biggest away win: Krylia Sovetov 0–4 Krasnodar; Anzhi 0–4 Spartak
- Highest scoring: Mordovia 4–6 CSKA
- Longest winning run: 7 matches: CSKA (18 Jul–30 Aug)
- Longest unbeaten run: 14 matches: CSKA (18 Jul–31 Oct)
- Longest winless run: 10 matches: Mordovia (22 Nov–23 Apr)
- Longest losing run: 5 matches: Mordovia (14 Sep–19 Oct)
- Highest attendance: 41,850; Spartak – CSKA (14 August 2015)
- Lowest attendance: 1,107; Mordovia – Rubin (30 August 2015, played in Samara)
- Average attendance: 10,996

The 2015–16 Russian Premier League was the 24th season of the premier football competition in Russia since the dissolution of the Soviet Union and the 14th under the current Russian Premier League name.

Zenit Saint Petersburg came into the season as defending champions of the 2014–15 season. CSKA Moscow won the title on the final day.

== Teams ==
Locations of teams in the 2015–16 Russian Premier League

As in previous season, 16 teams played in the 2015–16 season. After the 2014–15 season, FC Torpedo Moscow and FC Arsenal Tula were relegated to the 2015–16 Russian National Football League. They were replaced by two clubs who qualified automatically from the 2014–15 Russian National Football League, FC Krylia Sovetov Samara and FC Anzhi Makhachkala.

=== Stadiums ===
Team	Stadium	Opened	Capacity
Amkar	Zvezda, Perm	1969	17,130
Anzhi	Anzhi Arena, Kaspiysk	2003	24,859
CSKA	Arena Khimki, Khimki	2008	18,636
Dynamo Moscow	Arena Khimki, Khimki	2008	18,636
Krasnodar	Kuban, Krasnodar	1961	30,889
Krylia Sovetov	Metallurg, Samara	1957	33,001
Kuban	Kuban, Krasnodar	1961	30,889
Lokomotiv	Lokomotiv, Moscow	2002	28,810
Mordovia	Start, Saransk	2004	11,613
Rostov	Olimp-2, Rostov-on-Don	1930	15,843
Rubin	Kazan Arena, Kazan	2013	45,379
Spartak Moscow	Otkrytiye Arena, Moscow	2014	44,929
Terek	Akhmat-Arena, Grozny	2011	30,597
Ufa	Neftyanik, Ufa	1967	15,234
Ural	SKB-Bank Arena, Yekaterinburg	1940	10,000
Zenit	Petrovsky, Saint Petersburg	1925	21,042

=== Personnel and sponsorship ===
Team	Location	Head coach	Captain	Kitmaker	Sponsor
Amkar	Perm	(Russia) Gadzhi Gadzhiyev	(Russia) Dmitri Belorukov	Joma	Government of Perm Region
Anzhi	Makhachkala	(Uzbekistan) Ruslan Agalarov	(Russia) Ali Gadzhibekov	Nike	Caspian Flat Glass
CSKA	Moscow	(Russia) Leonid Slutsky	(Russia) Igor Akinfeev	Adidas	Rosseti
Dynamo	Moscow	(Russia) Sergei Chikishev (caretaker)	(Russia) Igor Denisov	Nike	VTB
Krasnodar	Krasnodar	(Russia) Oleg Kononov	(Sweden) Andreas Granqvist	Kappa	Constell Group
Krylia Sovetov	Samara	(Belgium) Franky Vercauteren	(Russia) Ivan Taranov	Nike	Government of Samara
Kuban	Krasnodar	(Russia) Igor Osinkin	(Russia) Aleksandr Belenov	Adidas	RGMK
Lokomotiv	Moscow	(Tajikistan) Igor Cherevchenko	(Croatia) Vedran Ćorluka	Adidas	RZD
Mordovia	Saransk	(Russia) Marat Mustafin (caretaker)	(Russia) Aleksei Ivanov	Adidas	Mordovcement
Rostov	Rostov-on-Don	(Turkmenistan) Kurban Berdyev	(Moldova) Alexandru Gațcan	Joma	Energosbyt Rostovenergo
Rubin	Kazan	(Ukraine) Valeriy Chaly	(Russia) Oleg Kuzmin	Puma	TAIF-NK
Spartak	Moscow	(Russia) Dmitri Alenichev	(Russia) Artyom Rebrov	Nike	Lukoil
Terek	Grozny	(Russia) Rashid Rakhimov	(Russia) Rizvan Utsiyev	Adidas	Akhmat Foundation
Ufa	Ufa	(Russia) Sergei Tomarov (caretaker)	(Russia) Azamat Zaseyev	Joma	Bashinformsvyaz
Ural	Yekaterinburg	(Belarus) Vadim Skripchenko	(Russia) Spartak Gogniyev	Umbro	TMK Group Renova Group
Zenit	St. Petersburg	(Portugal) André Villas-Boas	(Portugal) Danny	Nike	Gazprom

=== Managerial changes ===
Team	Outgoing	Manner	Date	Table	Incoming	Date	Table
Mordovia	(Russia) Yuri Semin	Contract expired	31 May 2015	pre-season	(Russia) Andrei Gordeyev	3 June 2015	pre-season
Spartak	(Switzerland) Murat Yakin	Mutual consent	31 May 2015	pre-season	(Russia) Dmitri Alenichev	10 June 2015	pre-season
Anzhi Makhachkala	(Russia) Sergei Tashuyev	Contract expired	31 May 2015	pre-season	(Russia) Yuri Semin	18 June 2015	pre-season
Kuban Krasnodar	(Belarus) Andrei Sosnitskiy (caretaker)	End as caretaker	31 May 2015	pre-season	(Russia) Dmitri Khokhlov	10 June 2015	pre-season
Lokomotiv Moscow	(Tajikistan) Igor Cherevchenko (caretaker)	Change of contract	2 June 2015	pre-season	(Tajikistan) Igor Cherevchenko	2 June 2015	pre-season
Ural Sverdlovsk Oblast	(Russia) Aleksandr Tarkhanov	Change of contract	8 June 2015	pre-season	(Belarus) Viktor Goncharenko	14 June 2015	pre-season
Dynamo Moscow	(Russia) Stanislav Cherchesov	Mutual consent	13 July 2015	pre-season	(Russia) Andrey Kobelev	13 July 2015	pre-season
Ural Sverdlovsk Oblast	(Belarus) Viktor Goncharenko	Mutual consent	1 September 2015	11th	(Belarus) Vadim Skripchenko	3 September 2015 (caretaker); 22 September 2015 (permanent)	11th
Rubin Kazan	(Russia) Rinat Bilyaletdinov	Fired	4 September 2015	15th	(Russia) Yuri Utkulbayev (caretaker)	6 September 2015	15th
Rubin Kazan	(Russia) Yuri Utkulbayev (caretaker)	Caretaking spell over	10 September 2015	15th	(Ukraine) Valeriy Chaly	10 September 2015 (caretaker); 9 October 2015 (permanent)	15th
Kuban Krasnodar	(Russia) Dmitri Khokhlov	Fired	16 September 2015	16th	(Russia) Sergei Tashuyev	17 September 2015	16th
Anzhi Makhachkala	(Russia) Yuri Semin	Mutual consent	29 September 2015	16th	(Uzbekistan) Ruslan Agalarov	29 September 2015 (caretaker); 24 October 2015 (permanent)	16th
Ufa	(Russia) Igor Kolyvanov	Mutual consent	21 October 2015	15th	(Russia) Yevgeni Perevertailo	21 October 2015	15th
Mordovia Saransk	(Russia) Andrei Gordeyev	Mutual consent	7 April 2016	15th	(Russia) Marat Mustafin (caretaker)	7 April 2016	15th
Kuban Krasnodar	(Russia) Sergei Tashuyev	Resigned	26 April 2016	14th	(Russia) Arsen Papikyan (caretaker)	26 April 2016	14th
Kuban Krasnodar	(Russia) Arsen Papikyan (caretaker)	Caretaking spell over	4 May 2016	15th	(Russia) Igor Osinkin	4 May 2016	15th
Dynamo Moscow	(Russia) Andrey Kobelev	Mutual consent	10 May 2016	12th	(Russia) Sergei Chikishev (caretaker)	10 May 2016	12th
Ufa	(Russia) Yevgeni Perevertailo	Resigned	18 May 2016	15th	(Russia) Sergei Tomarov (caretaker)	18 May 2016	15th

Last updated: 18 May 2016

== Tournament format and regulations ==
=== Basic ===
The 16 teams played a round-robin tournament whereby each team plays each one of the other teams twice, once at home and once away. Thus, a total of 240 matches was played, with 30 matches played by each team.

=== Promotion and relegation ===
The teams that finish 15th and 16th will be relegated to the FNL, while the top 2 in that league will be promoted to the Premier League for the 2016–17 season.

The 13th and 14th Premier League teams will play the 4th and 3rd FNL teams respectively in two playoff games with the winners securing Premier League spots for the 2016–17 season.

== League table ==
Pos	Team	Pld	W	D	L	GF	GA	GD	Pts	Qualification or relegation
1	CSKA Moscow (C)	30	20	5	5	51	25	+26	65	Qualification for the Champions League group stage
2	Rostov	30	19	6	5	41	20	+21	63	Qualification for the Champions League third qualifying round
3	Zenit Saint Petersburg	30	17	8	5	61	32	+29	59	Qualification for the Europa League group stage (Note: Zenit Saint Petersburg qualified for the Europa League group stage by winning the 2015–16 Russian Cup.)
4	Krasnodar	30	16	8	6	54	25	+29	56	Qualification for the Europa League third qualifying round
5	Spartak Moscow	30	15	5	10	48	39	+9	50	Qualification for the Europa League third qualifying round
6	Lokomotiv Moscow	30	14	8	8	43	33	+10	50	
7	Terek Grozny	30	11	11	8	35	30	+5	44	
8	Ural Sverdlovsk Oblast	30	10	9	11	39	46	−7	39	
9	Krylia Sovetov Samara	30	9	8	13	19	31	−12	35	
10	Rubin Kazan	30	9	6	15	33	39	−6	33	
11	Amkar Perm	30	7	10	13	22	33	−11	31	
12	Ufa	30	6	9	15	25	44	−19	27	
13	Anzhi Makhachkala (O)	30	6	8	16	28	50	−22	26	Qualification for the Relegation play-offs
14	Kuban Krasnodar (R)	30	5	11	14	34	44	−10	26	Qualification for the Relegation play-offs
15	Dynamo Moscow (R)	30	5	10	15	25	47	−22	25	Relegation to Football National League
16	Mordovia Saransk (R)	30	4	12	14	30	50	−20	24	Relegation to Football National League

Source: Russian Premier League, Soccerway
Rules for classification: 1) Points; 2) Matches won; 3) Head-to-head points; 4) Head-to-head matches won; 5) Head-to-head goal difference; 6) Head-to-head goals scored; 7) Head-to-head away goals; 8) Goal difference; 9) Goals scored; 10) Away goals scored.
(C) Champions; (O) Play-off winners; (R) Relegated

== Relegation play-offs ==
The draw for relegation play-offs scheduling took place on 10 May 2016.

=== First leg ===
24 May 2016

Volgar Astrakhan	0–1	Anzhi Makhachkala
	Report	Boli 90+2'

Central Stadium, Astrakhan
Attendance: 10,500
Referee: Kirill Levnikov

24 May 2016

Kuban Krasnodar	1–0	Tom Tomsk
Armaș 19' (pen.)	Report

Kuban Stadium, Krasnodar
Attendance: 9,501
Referee: Aleksandr Egorov

=== Second leg ===
27 May 2016

Anzhi Makhachkala	2–0	Volgar Astrakhan
Lazić 7'; Boli 34'	Report

Anzhi Arena, Kaspiysk
Attendance: 21,500
Referee: Sergey Lapochkin

Anzhi Makhachkala won 3–0 on aggregate and remained in the 2016–17 Russian Premier League.

27 May 2016

Tom Tomsk	2–0	Kuban Krasnodar
Bashkirov 57'; Ciupercă 72'	Report

Trud Stadium, Tomsk
Attendance: 9,500
Referee: Vitaly Meshkov

Tom Tomsk won 2–1 on aggregate and were promoted to the 2016–17 Russian Premier League.

== Results ==
Home \ Away	AMK	ANZ	CSK	DYN	KRA	KRY	KUB	LOK	MOR	ROS	RUB	SPA	TER	UFA	URA	ZEN
Amkar Perm		1–1	2–0	1–1	0–1	1–0	1–1	0–1	2–1	0–0	1–2	1–3	1–0	1–0	1–1	0–2
Anzhi Makhachkala	0–1		1–1	2–3	2–2	0–1	1–0	1–3	3–0	0–0	1–2	0–4	0–2	1–1	1–1	0–1
CSKA Moscow	2–0	1–0		1–0	2–0	0–2	2–0	1–1	7–1	2–1	1–0	1–0	1–0	2–0	3–2	2–2
Dynamo Moscow	0–0	1–2	0–2		1–4	0–1	2–1	2–2	2–2	1–3	0–0	2–3	0–1	2–0	1–0	0–3
Krasnodar	1–0	3–0	2–1	4–0		3–0	1–1	1–2	0–0	2–1	2–1	0–1	1–1	4–0	6–0	0–0
Krylia Sovetov Samara	0–0	0–0	0–2	0–0	0–4		3–0	0–0	1–0	0–1	1–1	0–2	0–2	1–0	1–1	0–2
Kuban Krasnodar	1–1	1–1	0–1	1–0	2–3	2–0		6–2	1–2	0–1	0–1	3–0	2–2	1–1	0–2	2–2
Lokomotiv Moscow	3–0	0–2	1–1	1–1	2–1	2–0	0–1		3–0	0–2	1–0	0–2	0–0	2–0	2–2	2–0
Mordovia Saransk	1–1	4–0	4–6	1–1	0–1	1–2	1–1	0–1		2–1	2–1	0–1	0–0	0–1	1–1	0–3
Rostov	1–0	1–0	2–0	1–0	0–0	1–1	2–1	2–1	3–2		1–0	2–0	1–1	1–1	1–0	3–0
Rubin Kazan	0–2	1–2	0–1	4–1	1–1	2–0	1–0	3–1	1–1	0–3		2–2	0–1	3–1	1–2	1–3
Spartak Moscow	2–1	1–2	1–2	3–0	3–2	1–0	2–2	1–2	2–2	1–0	1–0		3–0	2–2	0–1	2–2
Terek Grozny	2–0	3–2	0–0	1–1	0–1	0–1	1–1	2–1	0–0	0–2	2–1	2–1		4–1	1–1	4–1
Ufa	2–1	2–0	1–3	0–1	1–1	1–0	2–2	0–3	1–1	1–2	1–1	3–0	1–0		0–1	0–1
Ural Sverdlovsk Oblast	3–1	4–2	0–3	1–1	3–1	1–1	2–0	1–3	3–1	1–2	0–1	0–1	3–3	1–0		1–4
Zenit St. Petersburg	1–1	5–1	2–0	2–1	0–2	1–3	4–1	1–1	0–0	3–0	4–2	5–2	3–0	1–1	3–0	

Source: Russian Premier League
Legend: Blue = home team win; Yellow = draw; Red = away team win.

=== Positions by round ===
The table lists the positions of teams after each week of matches. In order to preserve chronological evolvements, any postponed matches are not included to the round at which they were originally scheduled, but added to the full round they were played immediately afterwards.

Team ╲ Round	1	2	3	4	5	6	7	8	9	10	11	12	13	14	15	16	17	18	19	20	21	22	23	24	25	26	27	28	29	30
CSKA Moscow	6	3	2	2	1	1	1	1	1	1	1	1	1	1	1	1	1	1	1	2	1	2	1	2	2	1	1	1	1	1
Rostov	10	4	6	5	5	5	5	7	5	4	5	4	4	2	2	2	2	2	2	1	2	1	2	1	1	2	2	2	2	2
Zenit St. Petersburg	2	1	1	1	2	2	3	3	3	3	3	3	3	4	4	4	4	6	5	5	4	4	3	3	5	4	3	3	3	3
Krasnodar	3	6	7	8	6	6	8	6	9	9	9	9	8	7	5	6	6	5	4	4	7	6	5	5	4	3	4	4	4	4
Spartak Moscow	8	5	4	4	4	4	4	4	4	5	4	5	5	5	6	5	5	4	7	7	5	7	7	7	7	6	6	5	5	5
Lokomotiv Moscow	4	2	3	3	3	3	2	2	2	2	2	2	2	3	3	3	3	3	3	3	3	3	4	4	3	5	5	6	6	6
Terek Grozny	9	10	14	11	12	12	12	10	10	10	7	6	6	8	7	7	7	7	6	6	6	5	6	6	6	7	7	7	7	7
Ural Sverdlovsk Oblast	1	7	8	9	10	10	11	9	8	6	6	7	7	6	8	8	8	8	8	8	8	8	8	8	8	8	8	8	8	8
Krylia Sovetov Samara	5	8	9	10	11	9	7	5	6	7	8	8	9	10	12	11	11	12	12	12	12	12	12	10	10	10	9	9	9	9
Rubin Kazan	12	16	16	16	13	14	15	13	12	12	13	12	12	12	10	9	9	9	9	9	9	10	9	9	9	9	10	10	10	10
Amkar Perm	14	9	5	6	8	8	9	11	11	11	11	11	11	9	11	12	12	10	10	10	10	9	10	11	11	11	11	11	11	11
Ufa	7	13	13	14	9	11	14	15	16	15	14	15	13	14	13	13	13	13	13	14	14	14	13	13	13	13	13	13	15	12
Anzhi Makhachkala	15	15	15	15	16	16	13	14	15	16	15	14	16	16	16	16	16	14	14	15	16	16	15	16	15	16	16	16	13	13
Kuban Krasnodar	16	14	10	12	15	15	16	16	14	14	12	13	14	13	14	14	14	15	15	13	13	13	14	14	14	15	15	15	12	14
Dynamo Moscow	11	12	12	7	7	7	6	8	7	8	10	10	10	11	9	10	10	11	11	11	11	11	11	12	12	12	12	12	14	15
Mordovia Saransk	13	11	11	13	14	13	10	12	13	13	16	16	15	15	15	15	15	16	16	16	15	15	16	15	16	14	14	14	16	16

Source: resultados-futbol.com

== Season statistics ==
=== Scoring ===
- First goal of the season: Haris Handžić for Ufa against Spartak Moscow (17 July 2015)
- First double: Hulk for Zenit against FC Ural (26 July 2015)
- First hat-trick: Spartak Gogniyev for FC Ural against Anzhi (12 March 2016)
- First poker: Fyodor Smolov for FC Krasnodar against FC Ural (10 April 2016)

=== Top goalscorers ===
Rank	Player	Team	Goals (pen.)	Minutes
1	(Russia) Fyodor Smolov	Krasnodar	20	2450
2	(Netherlands) Quincy Promes	Spartak	18 (2)	2470
3	(Brazil) Hulk	Zenit	16 (6)	2252
4	(Russia) Artyom Dzyuba	Zenit	14	2397
5	(Nigeria) Ahmed Musa	CSKA	12	2509
6	(Russia) Yevgeni Lutsenko	Mordovia	10	1866
7	(Poland) Maciej Rybus	Terek	9 (1)	1740
7	(Russia) Pavel Mamayev	Krasnodar	9 (3)	2283
7	(Iran) Sardar Azmoun	Rostov	9	1130
10	(Senegal) Oumar Niasse	Lokomotiv	8 (1)	1165
10	(Cape Verde) Zé Luís	Spartak	8	1587
10	(Paraguay) Lorenzo Melgarejo	Kuban/Spartak	8	1559
10	(Russia) Vladislav Ignatyev	Kuban/Lokomotiv	8 (1)	1701
10	(Ivory Coast) Yannick Boli	Anzhi	8 (2)	1889
10	(Russia) Oleg Shatov	Zenit	8	2049
10	(Russia) Aleksandr Samedov	Lokomotiv	8	2430

Last updated: 12 May 2016

== Attendance ==
=== Average home attendances ===
Ranked from highest to lowest average attendance.

Updated as of 1 December 2015

Team	GP	Total	High	Low	Average
Spartak	9	250,773	41,850	15,051	27,864
Zenit	9	151,659	18,593	14,880	16,851
Terek	8	128,229	19,780	12,470	16,029
Krylia Sovetov	8	114,277	26,280	4,089	14,285
FC Rostov	9	112,094	14,057	10,035	12,455
FC Krasnodar	8	97,867	25,250	4,875	12,233
Rubin	8	94,357	20,255	5,842	11,795
Anzhi	9	103,281	18,100	4,530	11,475
Kuban	9	85,218	15,213	5,517	9,469
Lokomotiv	8	72,740	14,140	5,348	9,093
CSKA	9	79,561	15,000	5,500	8,840
Amkar	9	70,440	14,800	2,350	7,827
Dynamo	8	55,661	13,500	3,623	6,958
FC Ufa	8	54,397	14,200	3,375	6,780
Mordovia	9	47,586	11,575	1,107	5,287
Ural	9	47,529	9,900	2,450	5,281

=== Highest attendances ===
Rank	Round	Home team	Score	Away team	Attendance	Date	Stadium
1	5	Spartak	1–2	CSKA	41,850	14 August 2015	Otkrytie Arena
2	10	Spartak	2–2	Zenit	41,214	26 September 2015	Otkrytie Arena
3	12	Spartak	1–2	Lokomotiv	38,651	18 October 2015	Otkrytie Arena
4	4	Krylia Sovetov	0–2	Spartak	26,280	9 August 2015	Metallurg
5	7	Spartak	1–2	Anzhi	26,167	29 August 2015	Otkrytie Arena
6	3	Spartak	1–0	Rubin	26,163	3 August 2015	Otkrytie Arena
7	4	Krasnodar	1–1	Kuban	25,250	10 August 2015	Kuban
8	2	Krasnodar	0–1	Spartak	24,956	26 July 2015	Kuban
9	2	Krylia Sovetov	0–2	CSKA	23,226	24 July 2015	Metallurg
10	1	Spartak	2–2	Ufa	23,221	17 July 2015	Otkrytie Arena

== Season events ==
=== Transfer bans ===
On 3 September 2015, FC Anzhi Makhachkala was banned from registering new players for debts to FC Zenit Saint Petersburg for Igor Denisov's transfer fee. Anzhi's debt was paid and the ban was lifted on 16 December 2015.

On 9 September 2015, FC Dynamo Moscow was banned from registering new players for debts to FC Zenit Saint Petersburg for Igor Denisov's and Tomáš Hubočan's transfer fees and to FC Anzhi Makhachkala for Igor Denisov's, Vladimir Gabulov's and Christopher Samba's transfer fees. On 17 November 2015, the ban was re-confirmed due to new debts to former coaching staff (Stanislav Cherchesov, Miroslav Romaschenko and Vladimir Panikov). Dynamo's debts were paid and the ban was lifted on 15 December 2015.

On 10 September 2015, FC Rostov was banned from registering new players for debts to former player Artyom Dzyuba. On 8 October 2015, the ban was re-confirmed for debts to FC Spartak Moscow for Artyom Dzyuba's transfer fee. On 29 October, the ban was re-confirmed for debts to FC Khimki for Ivan Novoseltsev's transfer fee. On 15 November 2015, the ban was re-confirmed for debts to former players Anton Amelchenko and Vitali Dyakov and to FC Zenit Saint Petersburg for Pavel Mogilevets's transfer fee. On 8 December 2015, the ban was re-confirmed for debts to former player Hrvoje Milić and to FC Rubin Kazan for Sardar Azmoun's transfer fee. On 11 February 2016, the ban was re-confirmed for debts to player Nemanja Nikolić. Rostov's debts were paid and the ban was lifted on 24 February 2016.

On 24 September 2015, FC Kuban Krasnodar was banned from registering new players for debts to FC Lokomotiv Moscow for Sergei Tkachyov's transfer fee. On 15 November 2015, the ban was re-confirmed for debts to FC Krylia Sovetov Samara for Anton Sosnin's transfer fee and to PFC CSKA Moscow for Svyatoslav Georgiyevsky's transfer fee. On 25 December 2015, the ban was re-confirmed for debts to former manager Leonid Kuchuk and to FC Dynamo Moscow for Stanislav Manolev's transfer free. On 21 January 2016, the ban was re-confirmed for debts to player Yevgeni Frolov. Kuban's debts were paid and the ban was lifted on 26 February 2016, 7 hours before the winter player registration window would close.

On 25 October 2015, FC Rubin Kazan was banned from registering new players for debts to former conditioning coach Yevgeni Bondarenko. Bondarenko and Rubin agreed on the debt settlement schedule and the ban was lifted on 17 February 2016.

On 8 December 2015, FC Amkar Perm was banned from registering new players for debts to former manager Slavoljub Muslin. Amkar's debt was paid and the ban was lifted on 28 January 2016.

== Awards ==
=== Top 33 ===
On 31 May 2016, Russian Football Union named its list of 33 top players:

Goalkeepers

1. (Russia) Igor Akinfeev (CSKA)
2. (Russia) Gulherme (Lokomotiv)
3. (Russia) Soslan Dzhanayev (Rostov)

Right backs

1. (Russia) Igor Smolnikov (Zenit)
2. (Brazil) Mário Fernandes (CSKA)
3. (Russia) Oleg Kuzmin (Rubin)

Right-centre backs

1. (Russia) Vasili Berezutski (CSKA)
2. (Croatia) Vedran Ćorluka (Lokomotiv)
3. (Sweden) Andreas Granqvist (Krasnodar)

Left-centre backs

1. (Russia) Sergei Ignashevich (CSKA)
2. (Argentina) Ezequiel Garay (Zenit)
3. (Angola) Bastos (Rostov)

Left backs

1. (Uzbekistan) Vitaliy Denisov (Lokomotiv)
2. (Russia) Yuri Zhirkov (Dynamo/Zenit)
3. (Russia) Fyodor Kudryashov (Terek/Rostov)

Right defensive midfielders

1. (Sweden) Pontus Wernbloom (CSKA)
2. (Spain) Javi García (Zenit)
3. (Russia) Oleg Ivanov (Terek)

Left defensive midfielders

1. (Russia) Alan Dzagoev (CSKA)
2. (Belgium) Axel Witsel (Zenit)
3. (Ecuador) Christian Noboa (Rostov)

Attacking midfielders

1. (Russia) Pavel Mamayev (Krasnodar)
2. (Portugal) Danny (Zenit)
3. (Finland) Roman Eremenko (CSKA)

Right wingers

1. (Brazil) Hulk (Zenit)
2. (Netherlands) Quincy Promes (Spartak)
3. (Russia) Aleksandr Samedov (Lokomotiv)

Strikers

1. (Russia) Fyodor Smolov (Krasnodar)
2. (Russia) Artem Dzyuba (Zenit)
3. (Iran) Sardar Azmoun (Rostov)

Left wingers

1. (Nigeria) Ahmed Musa (CSKA)
2. (Russia) Oleg Shatov (Zenit)
3. (Russia) Dmitry Poloz (Rostov)
