= Kirill Gashichev =

Russian footballer and manager

Personal information
- Full name: Kirill Mikhailovich Gashichev
- Date of birth: 20 March 1980 (age 46)
- Place of birth: Leningrad, Russian SFSR
- Height: 1.95 m (6 ft 5 in)
- Position: Goalkeeper

Youth career
- FC Izhorets Kolpino

Senior career*
Years	Team	Apps	(Gls)
1997	FC Izhorets Kolpino		
1998	FC Lokomotiv-d St. Petersburg (amateur)		
1999–2000	FC Ladoga Kirovsk		
2000	FC Petro St. Petersburg		
2001	FC Ladoga Vsevolozhsk		
2002	FC Petrotrest St. Petersburg (amateur)		
2002	FC Petro St. Petersburg		
2003	FC Pikalyovo	11	(0)
2004	FC Izhorets Kolpino		
2004–2005	FC Metallurg Pikalyovo (amateur)		
2006	FC Izhorets Kolpino		
2006–2007	FC Sever Murmansk (amateur)		
2007	FC Kolpino-INKON Kolpino		
2008	FC Yevrostroy Vsevolozhsk		
2008	FC Ruan-Neva St. Petersburg		
2008	FC Karelia Petrozavodsk (amateur)		
2008	FC Ruan-Neva Kirovsk		
2009–2010	FC Ruan-Tosno Tosno (amateur)		
2011–2012	FC Ruan St. Petersburg		

Managerial career
- 2013: FC Tosno (assistant)
- 2013–2014: FC Tosno (caretaker)
- 2014: FC Tosno (assistant)
- 2014: FC Tosno (caretaker)
- 2014–2018: FC Tosno (assistant)
- 2015: FC Tosno (caretaker)
- 2022–2024: PFC Sochi (reserves)
- 2025: FC Sochi-2
- * Club domestic league appearances and goals

Kirill Mikhailovich Gashichev (Russian: Кирилл Михайлович Гашичев; born 20 March 1980) is a Russian football manager and a former player.

== Playing career ==
As a player, he only played one season on the professional level in 2003 in the Russian Second Division with FC Pikalyovo.

== Coaching career ==
On 31 May 2024, Gashichev managed PFC Sochi in the second leg of Russian Premier League promotion play-offs as Sochi won 3–1 against FC Pari Nizhny Novgorod after losing the first leg at home with the score 1–2, getting Sochi the promotion to the top tier. Sochi's manager Robert Moreno did not arrive to the second-leg game "for family reasons", according to the club, leading to the speculation that Moreno has been fired.
