= Anton Apatin =

Russian football player

Anton Blast
Personal information
- Full name: Anton Olegovich Apatin
- Date of birth: 6 September 1986 (age 40)
- Place of birth: Murmansk, Russian SFSR
- Height: 1.76 m (5 ft 9 in)
- Positions: Midfielder; forward

Team information
- Current team: FC Dynamo St. Petersburg

Senior career*
Years	Team	Apps	(Gls)
2010	FC Dynamo-GPS Murmansk		
2011	FC Sever Murmansk	31	(5)
2012–2014	FC Sever Murmansk	48	(8)
2014	FC Dynamo St. Petersburg	16	(0)
2015	FC Sever Murmansk (amateur)		
2015	FC Karelia Petrozavodsk	16	(5)
2016–2017	FC Dynamo St. Petersburg	31	(3)
2017–2018	FC Dynamo Bryansk	22	(0)
2019	FC Zvezda St. Petersburg (amateur)		
2019	FC Dynamo St. Petersburg (amateur)		
- * Club domestic league appearances and goals

Anton Olegovich Apatin (Russian: Антон Олегович Апатин; born 6 September 1986) is a Russian former football player.

== Club career ==
He made his debut in the Russian Second Division for FC Sever Murmansk on 18 April 2011 in a game against FC Pskov-747 Pskov.

He made his Russian Football National League debut for FC Dynamo St. Petersburg on 12 July 2014 in a game against FC Tosno.
