= Ruslan Khubetsov =

Russian association football player

Personal information
- Full name: Ruslan Isidorovich Khubetsov
- Date of birth: 8 March 1973 (age 53)
- Height: 1.88 m (6 ft 2 in)
- Position: Goalkeeper

Senior career*
Years	Team	Apps	(Gls)
1989	FC Khimik Oktyabrskoye		
1989–1990	FC Avtodor Vladikavkaz	1	(0)
1990	FC Uralan Elista	1	(0)
1991–1994	FC Spartak Vladikavkaz	5	(0)
1995–1996	FC Avtodor-BMK Vladikavkaz	23	(0)
1997	FC Spartak Anapa	23	(0)
1998	FC Elkhot Elkhotovo		
1999	FC Vityaz Krymsk	15	(0)
2000	FC Reformatsiya Abakan	5	(0)
2000	FC Dynamo-Mashinostroitel Kirov	5	(0)
2001	FC Nemkom Krasnodar (amateur)		
2003	FC Vityaz Krymsk	3	(0)

Managerial career
- 2005–2007: FC Avtodor Vladikavkaz (assistant)
- 2010–2012: FC FAYUR Beslan (administrator)
- 2013–2014: FC Alania-d Vladikavkaz (administrator)
- 2014–2019: FC Spartak Vladikavkaz (administrator)
- * Club domestic league appearances and goals

Ruslan Isidorovich Khubetsov (Russian: Руслан Исидорович Хубецов; born 8 March 1973) is a former Russian football player.

His son David Khubetsov is now a professional goalkeeper as well.
