= Igor Khudogov =

Russian footballer and official

Personal information
- Full name: Igor Vyacheslavovich Khudogov
- Date of birth: 27 February 1978 (age 48)
- Place of birth: Leningrad, Russian SFSR
- Height: 1.75 m (5 ft 9 in)
- Positions: Defender; midfielder

Youth career
- Rubin Petrodvorets

Senior career*
Years	Team	Apps	(Gls)
1995–1997	FC Zenit-d St. Petersburg	68	(3)
1998	FC Zenit-2 St. Petersburg	33	(1)
1999	FC Dynamo Vologda	15	(2)
2000	FC Severstal Cherepovets	37	(3)
2001–2002	FC Zenit St. Petersburg	0	(0)
2001–2002	→ FC Tyumen (loan)	53	(4)
2003–2005	FC Petrotrest St. Petersburg	65	(4)
2007–2011	FC Sever Murmansk	110	(1)
2012–2013	FC Tosno (amateur)		

Managerial career
- 2013–2018: FC Tosno (team director)
- * Club domestic league appearances and goals

Igor Vyacheslavovich Khudogov (Russian: Игорь Вячеславович Худогов; born 27 February 1978) is a Russian professional football official and a former player.

== Club career ==
He played in the Russian Football National League for FC Petrotrest St. Petersburg in 2005.
