= Papikyan =

Papikyan (Armenian: Պապիկյանը) is an Armenian surname. Notable people with the surname include:

- Aghvan Papikyan (born 1994), Polish-born Armenian footballer
- Arsen Papikyan (born 1972), Russian footballer and manager
- Suren Papikyan (born 1986), Armenian politician
