= Tsentralnyi Profsoyuz Stadion =

Tsentralnyi Profsoyuz Stadion may refer to:

- Tsentralnyi Profsoyuz Stadion (Murmansk)
- Tsentralnyi Profsoyuz Stadion (Voronezh)
