= Ramazan Shumakhov =

Russian footballer and manager

Personal information
- Full name: Ramazan Magomedovich Shumakhov
- Date of birth: 16 July 1969 (age 57)
- Height: 1.80 m (5 ft 11 in)
- Position: Defender

Youth career
- DYuSSh Maykop

Senior career*
Years	Team	Apps	(Gls)
1991–2000	FC Druzhba Maykop	311	(20)
2001	FC Terek Grozny	31	(1)
2002	FC Nemkom Krasnodar	2	(0)
2002	FC Spartak Anapa	15	(0)
2003	FC Universitet Belorechensk		
2006	FC Druzhba Maykop	3	(0)

Managerial career
- 2006: FC Druzhba Maykop (assistant)
- 2010–2012: FC Druzhba Maykop (assistant)
- 2012–2015: FC Druzhba Maykop
- * Club domestic league appearances and goals

Ramazan Magomedovich Shumakhov (Russian: Рамазан Магомедович Шумахов; born 16 July 1969) is a Russian football manager and a former player.

== Club career ==
He made his Russian Football National League debut for FC Druzhba Maykop on 9 May 1992 in a game against FC Metallurg Lipetsk. He played 7 seasons in the FNL for Druzhba.
