= Pikalyovsky =

Pikalyovsky (masculine), Pikalyovskaya (feminine), or Pikalyovskoye (neuter) may refer to:

- Pikalyovsky District (1927–1932), a former district of Novgorod and Leningrad Oblasts
- Pikalyovskoye Urban Settlement, a municipal formation corresponding to Pikalyovskoye Settlement Municipal Formation, an administrative division of Boksitogorsky District of Leningrad Oblast, Russia
- Pikalyovskaya Volost, an administrative division of Cherepovets Governorate with the administrative center in the then-selo of Pikalyovo
