= Yuri Mamontyev =

Russian footballer

Personal information
- Full name: Yuri Viktorovich Mamontyev
- Date of birth: 15 March 1973 (age 53)
- Place of birth: Leningrad, Russian SFSR
- Height: 1.77 m (5 ft 9 1/2 in)
- Position: Midfielder

Youth career
- FC Obukhovets Leningrad

Senior career*
| Years | Team | Apps | (Gls) |
| 1989–1995 | FC Zenit Saint Petersburg | 84 | (9) |
| 1995 | → FC Zenit-d Saint Petersburg | 7 | (0) |
| 1996 | FC Karelia-Erzi Petrozavodsk | 18 | (0) |

International career
| 1994 | Russia U-21 | 1 | (0) |
- * Club domestic league appearances and goals

Yuri Viktorovich Mamontyev (Russian: Юрий Викторович Мамонтьев; born 15 March 1973) is a Russian former football player.
