= Nikolai Karpenko (footballer) =

Russian footballer (born 1977)

Personal information
- Full name: Nikolai Georgiyevich Karpenko
- Date of birth: 26 February 1977 (age 49)
- Place of birth: Novorossiysk, Russian SFSR
- Height: 1.72 m (5 ft 7 1/2 in)
- Position: Defender

Youth career
- FC Chernomorets Novorossiysk

Senior career*
Years	Team	Apps	(Gls)
1994–1996	FC Chernomorets Novorossiysk	14	(0)
1996	→ FC Chernomorets-d Novorossiysk (loan)	5	(0)
1996	FC Niva Slavyansk-na-Kubani	18	(1)
1997–1998	FC Kuban Slavyansk-na-Kubani	41	(0)
1998	FC Anapa	9	(0)
2000	FC Reformatsiya Abakan	9	(0)
- * Club domestic league appearances and goals

Nikolai Georgiyevich Karpenko (Russian: Николай Георгиевич Карпенко; born 26 February 1977 in Novorossiysk) is a former Russian football player.
