= Aleksei Ivakhov =

Russian footballer and manager

Personal information
- Full name: Aleksei Yevgenyevich Ivakhov
- Date of birth: 27 July 1976 (age 50)
- Place of birth: Nizhneudinsk, Russian SFSR
- Height: 1.78 m (5 ft 10 in)
- Position: Forward

Senior career*
Years	Team	Apps	(Gls)
1997	DYuSSh GorONO Krasnoyarsk		
1998	FC Viktoriya Nazarovo	10	(2)
1999–2000	FC Reformatsiya Abakan	36	(7)
2000–2003	FC Dynamo-Mashinostroitel Kirov	99	(30)
2004	FC Metallurg Krasnoyarsk	7	(1)

Managerial career
- –2011: FC Yenisey Krasnoyarsk (youth)
- 2011–2013: FC Yenisey Krasnoyarsk (conditioning)
- 2013: FC Yenisey Krasnoyarsk
- 2013–2014: FC Yenisey Krasnoyarsk (assistant)
- 2014: FC Yenisey Krasnoyarsk
- 2014–2015: FC Yenisey Krasnoyarsk (assistant)
- 2015: FC Yenisey Krasnoyarsk
- 2015: FC Novokuznetsk
- 2019–2023: FC Yenisey Krasnoyarsk (general director)
- 2023: FC Yenisey Krasnoyarsk
- * Club domestic league appearances and goals

Aleksei Yevgenyevich Ivakhov (Russian: Алексей Евгеньевич Ивахов; born 27 July 1976) is a Russian football manager and a former player.
