= Pikalyovo =

Pikalyovo (Russian: Пикалёво) or Pikalevo (Пикалево) is the name of several inhabited localities in Russia.

== Urban localities ==
- Pikalyovo, Leningrad Oblast, a town in Pikalyovskoye Settlement Municipal Formation of Boksitogorsky District, Leningrad Oblast

== Rural localities ==
- Pikalevo, Vladimir Oblast, a village in Alexandrovsky District of Vladimir Oblast
