= Yevgeni Belashov =

Russian footballer

Personal information
- Full name: Yevgeni Sergeyevich Belashov
- Date of birth: 28 January 1980 (age 46)
- Height: 1.79 m (5 ft 10 in)
- Positions: Midfielder; defender

Youth career
- SUOR Stavropol

Senior career*
Years	Team	Apps	(Gls)
1998	FC Dynamo Stavropol	0	(0)
1999	FC Signal Izobilny (amateur)		
2000	FC Spartak-Kavkaztransgaz Izobilny	23	(2)
2001–2002	FC Baltika Kaliningrad	40	(2)
2003	FC Volga Ulyanovsk	7	(1)
2004	FC Baltika-Tarko Kaliningrad	15	(1)
2005	FC Gazovik Orenburg	17	(0)
2006	FC Rubin Novolokinskaya		
2007	FC Sibiryak Bratsk	12	(0)
2007	FC Azovets Primorsko-Akhtarsk		
2008	FC GNS-Spartak Krasnodar		
2008	FC Energetik Uren	19	(3)
2009	FC Angusht Nazran	17	(1)
2009	FC Kavkaztransgaz-2005 Ryzdvyany	12	(0)
2010	FC Avtodor Timashevsk		
2010–2011	FC Beysug Bryukhovetskaya		
2013–2017	FC Beysug Bryukhovetskaya		
- * Club domestic league appearances and goals

Yevgeni Sergeyevich Belashov (Russian: Евгений Серге́евич Белашов; born 28 January 1980) is a former Russian professional football player.

== Club career ==
He made his Russian Football National League debut for FC Baltika Kaliningrad on 8 May 2001 in a game against FC Lokomotiv Chita. That was his only season in the FNL.

== See also ==
- Football in Russia
- List of football clubs in Russia
