= Semakin =

Semakin (masculine, Russian: Семакин) or Semakina (feminine, Russian: Семакина) is a Russian surname. Notable people with the surname include:

- Maksim Semakin (born 1983), Russian soccer player
- Vitali Semakin (born 1976), Russian soccer coach and former player
