= Alyaksandr Chysty =

Belarusian footballer

Personal information
- Full name: Alyaksandr Yawhenavich Chysty
- Date of birth: 14 January 1972 (age 54)
- Place of birth: Minsk, Belarusian SSR
- Height: 1.95 m (6 ft 5 in)
- Position: Goalkeeper

Youth career
- Traktor Bobruisk

Senior career*
Years	Team	Apps	(Gls)
1992	Traktor Bobruisk	0	(0)
1992–1993	Belarus Maryina Gorka	16	(0)
1993–1995	Shakhtyor Soligorsk	62	(0)
1994–1995	→ Oresa Lyuban	1	(0)
1996–1997	Lokomotiv Nizhny Novgorod	18	(0)
1996–1997	→ Lokomotiv-d Nizhny Novgorod	14	(0)
1997	→ Torpedo Pavlovo (loan)	9	(0)
1998–2000	Torpedo Pavlovo	65	(0)
2001–2004	Amkar Perm	42	(0)
2005	Metallurg-Kuzbass Novokuznetsk	9	(0)
2006	Kuzbass-Dynamo Kemerovo	24	(0)
2006	Metafraks Gubakha		
2007	Zenit Chelyabinsk	8	(0)
- * Club domestic league appearances and goals

Alyaksandr Yawhenavich Chysty (Belarusian: Аляксандр Яўгенавіч Чысты; Russian: Александр Евгеньевич Чистый; Aleksandr Yevgenyevich Chisty; born 14 January 1972 in Minsk) is a former Belarusian football player.
