= Vladimir Klementyev =

Soviet footballer and coach

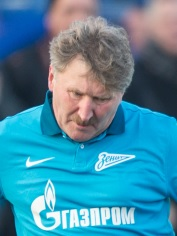
- Vladimir Klementyev in 2014

Personal information
- Full name: Vladimir Alekseyevich Klementyev
- Date of birth: January 4, 1956 (age 70)
- Place of birth: Leningrad, now St. Petersburg, Russian SFSR
- Height: 1.78 m (5 ft 10 in)
- Position: Forward

Senior career*
Years	Team	Apps	(Gls)
1973–1976	FC Dynamo Leningrad		
1976–1988	FC Zenit Leningrad	293	(72)
1988	FC Dynamo Leningrad	18	(6)
1989	FC Lada Togliatti	30	(9)
1993	FC Kosmos-Kirovets St. Petersburg	6	(0)

Managerial career
- 2001–2002: FC Svetogorets Svetogorsk (director of sports)
- 2003: FC Svetogorets Svetogorsk (assistant)
- 2006: FC Zenit-2 St. Petersburg (video operator)
- 2007–2008: FC Zenit-2 St. Petersburg (assistant)
- * Club domestic league appearances and goals

Vladimir Alekseyevich Klementyev (Russian: Владимир Алексеевич Клементьев; born January 4, 1956, in Leningrad, now St. Petersburg) is a Soviet professional football coach and a former player.

== Honours ==
- Soviet Top League champion: 1984.
- Soviet Top League bronze: 1980.
- USSR Federation Cup finalist: 1986.
