= Vitali Semakin =

Russian footballer and manager

Champion
Personal information
- Full name: Vitali Yuryevich Semakin
- Date of birth: 10 August 1976 (age 50)
- Place of birth: Shakhty, Russian SFSR
- Height: 1.74 m (5 ft 8 1/2 in)
- Position: Midfielder

Youth career
- RO UOR Rostov-on-Don

Senior career*
Years	Team	Apps	(Gls)
1992	FC Rostselmash-d Rostov-on-Don	11	(0)
1992–1995	FC Shakhtyor Shakhty	86	(3)
1996–1997	FC SKA Rostov-on-Don	76	(7)
1998	FC Shakhtyor Shakhty	13	(2)
1999–2001	FC Khimki	59	(5)
2001	FC Tyumen	12	(0)
2002	FC SKA Rostov-on-Don	17	(1)
2003–2006	FC Chita	118	(5)
2006–2007	FC Zvezda Irkutsk	52	(0)
2008	FC Bataysk-2007	28	(3)
2009	FC Dongazdobycha Sulin		
2010	FC MITOS Novocherkassk	15	(0)
2012	FC Dongazdobycha Sulin		
2013–2014	FC Chayka Peschanokopskoye (amateur)		

Managerial career
- 2013–2016: FC Chayka Peschanokopskoye
- 2016–2018: FC Chayka Peschanokopskoye (assistant)
- 2018–2019: FC Chayka Peschanokopskoye
- 2019: FC Chayka Peschanokopskoye (assistant)
- * Club domestic league appearances and goals

Vitali Yuryevich Semakin (Russian: Виталий Юрьевич Семакин; born 10 August 1976) is a Russian professional football manager and a former player.

== Club career ==
He played 6 seasons in the Russian Football National League for 4 different clubs.
