= FC Svetogorets =

Russian football club

- Full name: Football Club Svetogorets Svetogorsk
- Founded: 1978; 48 years ago 2012; 14 years ago (refounded)
- Dissolved: 2003
- Ground: Tsentralny, Svetogorsk
Home colours	Away colours

FC Svetogorets was a football club from Svetogorsk, Leningrad Oblast, Russia. Its foundation date is unknown but the club is known to exist at least since 1978. Played in some Leningrad Oblast championships in the 1990s. In 2000 it played in North-West zone of the Russian amateur championship (KFK) and won the zonal tournament. In 2001–2003 it played in the Russian Second Division, zone West, and in the Russian Cup. In 2004 it withdrew from the Russian Second Division and disappeared. Among its players were Aleksandr Kerzhakov, Sergei Dmitriev, Andrei Manannikov; among staff – Vladimir Kazachyonok and Vladimir Klementyev. Its home arena was Central Stadium in Svetogorsk.

== Results ==
Season	Tournament		Results	Notes
1992	Leningrad Oblast Championship		4th	
1994	Leningrad Oblast Championship		7th	
1995	Leningrad Oblast Championship		10th	
1996	Leningrad Oblast Championship		6th	
1997	Leningrad Oblast Championship		3rd	
1998	Leningrad Oblast Championship		10th	
1999	Leningrad Oblast Championship		1st	
2000	Russian Amateur Football League	North-West	1st	▲
2000	Russian Amateur Football League	Final tournament	9th	▲
2001	PFL, Zone «West»		7th	
2002	PFL, Zone «West»		4th	
2003	PFL, Zone «West»		7th	
2012	Leningrad Oblast Championship		9th	Named «NTL-Upakovka»
2013	Leningrad Oblast Championship		10th	
2014	Leningrad Oblast Championship		10th	
2015	Leningrad Oblast Championship		10th	
2016	Leningrad Oblast Championship		11th	
2017	Leningrad Oblast Championship		8th	
2018	Leningrad Oblast Championship		10th	

4 times the team took part in the Russian Cup. The highest achievement is reaching the 1/128 finals in the 2002/03 and 2003/04 seasons.
