= FC Sport Saint Petersburg =

SPb KLS
- Full name: Football Club Sport Saint Petersburg
- Nickname: SPb KLS
- Founded: 1888; 138 years ago
- Amateur Football League,
Home colours	Away colours

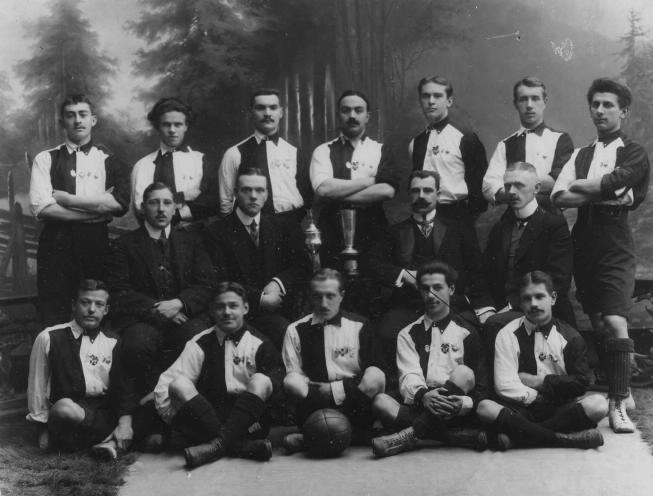
1913 Team.

The KLS SPb, which stands for Saint-Petersburg Circle of Sports Enthusiasts (Russian: «Санкт-Петербургский кружок любителей спорта», shortly СПБ КЛС) or just Sport is a sports club from Saint-Petersburg formed in 1888. The club became better known for its football team (department). Beside association football, the club was composed of athletes who practiced track and field ("light athletics"), cycling and ski sports as well as various other team sports.

The sports club was formed by cottage residents from Tyarlevo (Tärölä, east from Saint Petersburg) in 1888 as Society of Running Enthusiasts and were using a hippodrome in Tsarskoye Selo for their sports competitions. Later athletes from the sports club were using a park area of the Petrovsky Island. On 15 June 1896 the sports club was officially registered under the name "Saint-Petersburg Circle of Sports Enthusiasts" (abbreviated KLS or simply "Sport"). The club was financed by Prince Sergei Belosselsky-Belozersky. The main "enthusiast" of the club was Peotr Moskvin who is considered the forefather of track and field in modern Russia.

The association football (soccer) team of the club was organized on 1897, which made him one of the oldest soccer clubs in Russia. It also was one of the first All-Russian clubs that joined League competitions which were organized by British citizens in the Imperial Russia.

During the 20th century the Club won the City's championship title multiple times.

(Bolshevik) regime. The new government forced all sports organizations re-register as "proletarian organizations".

== Honors ==
- Saint-Petersburg City Championship (6): 1908, 1909, 1910, 1913, 1914, 1922
