= FC Khimik Koryazhma =

Russian football club

FC Khimik
- Full name: Football Club Khimik
- Founded: 1992
- League: Amateur Football League, Zone North-West
- Season 2018: 1st

FC Khimik (Russian: «Химик») is a Russian football club from Koryazhma.

It played professionally for one season in 1994, taking 8th place in Zone 4 of the Russian Third League.
