= Viktor Demidov =

Russian footballer and coach

Personal information
- Full name: Viktor Viktorovich Demidov
- Date of birth: 8 November 1964 (age 61)
- Position: Defender

Senior career*
Years	Team	Apps	(Gls)
1992	FC Volochanin Vyshny Volochyok	5	(0)

Managerial career
- 1997–2002: FC Volochanin-89 Vyshny Volochyok
- 2003–2004: FC Pskov-2000 Pskov
- 2005–2007: FC Lukhovitsy (assistant)
- 2008: FC Lukhovitsy
- 2009: FC Gubkin
- 2010: FC Volochanin-Ratmir Vyshny Volochyok
- 2011–2012: FC Volga Tver
- 2013: FC Tosno
- 2014: FC Daugava
- 2014: FC Dynamo Saint Petersburg
- 2016: Guria Lanchkhuti
- 2016–2017: BFC Daugavpils (assistant)
- 2018: Kolkheti Poti (caretaker)
- 2020: Lider-Chempion Ysyq-Köl
- 2021–2022: Zenit Penza
- * Club domestic league appearances and goals

Viktor Viktorovich Demidov (Russian: Виктор Викторович Демидов; born 8 November 1964) is a Russian professional football coach and a former player.
