= FC Zvezda Saint Petersburg =

Association football club in Russia

FC Zvezda SPb
- Full name: Football Club Zvezda Saint Petersburg
- Founded: 2008; 18 years ago
- Ground: Nova Arena
- Capacity: 995
- Owner(s): Trevis & VVK
- Chairman: Aleksandr Chernov
- Manager: Oleg Liforenko
- League: Russian Second League, Division B, Group 2
- 2026: 12th
- Website: fczvezda.com
Home colours	Away colours

FC Zvezda Saint Petersburg (Russian: ФК Звезда Санкт-Петербург) is a Russian football club based in Saint Petersburg. It plays in the fourth-tier Russian Second League Division B.

== History ==
The team was licensed for Russian Professional Football League for the first time for the 2019–20 season.

== Names ==
- Trevis and VVK (2008 - 2014)
- FC Zvezda (since 2014)

== Current squad ==
As of 11 September 2026, according to the Second League website.

Note: Flags indicate national team as defined under FIFA eligibility rules; some limited exceptions apply. Players may hold more than one non-FIFA nationality.

No.	Pos.	Nation	Player
1	GK	RUS	Andrey Zaytsev
3	DF	RUS	Vitaly Safronov
4	DF	RUS	Artyom Kolobov
5	MF	RUS	Yegor Pyatak
7	MF	RUS	Daniil Vislevsky
8	DF	RUS	Roman Belov
9	FW	RUS	Ruslan Angutayev
10	MF	RUS	Nikita Koldunov
11	MF	RUS	Andrey Uksusov
12	FW	RUS	Mark Gerasimov
13	MF	RUS	Vladimir Koledin
15	MF	RUS	Kirill Makarov
16	GK	RUS	Yegor Zolotarev
17	DF	RUS	Roman Zaytsev
18	FW	RUS	Artyom Tsvetkov

No.	Pos.	Nation	Player
21	MF	RUS	Maksim Kopitets
22	MF	RUS	Karim Agayev
23	DF	RUS	Mikhail Lukyanov
25	FW	RUS	Yegor Sakharov
37	MF	RUS	Matvey Vedkalov
52	FW	RUS	Vadim Leonov
59	DF	RUS	Andrey Zenyuk
67	DF	RUS	Filipp Nuretdinov
70	FW	RUS	Nidzhad Alyyev
71	DF	RUS	Artemy Kizilov
77	MF	RUS	Sevastyan Fayzulin
78	GK	RUS	Maksim Yefremov
79	DF	RUS	Igor Teymurkhanly
81	MF	RUS	Damir Zhelegotov

== Honours ==
North-West Football Championship of the Russian Amateur Football League

- Champion (5): 2012/2013, 2013, 2015, 2016, 2017

City Championship:

- Champion (8): 2010, 2011, 2012, 2013, 2014, 2015, 2016, 2017
