= Tsentralnyi Profsoyuz Stadion (Murmansk) =

Sports accommodation in Murmansk, Russia

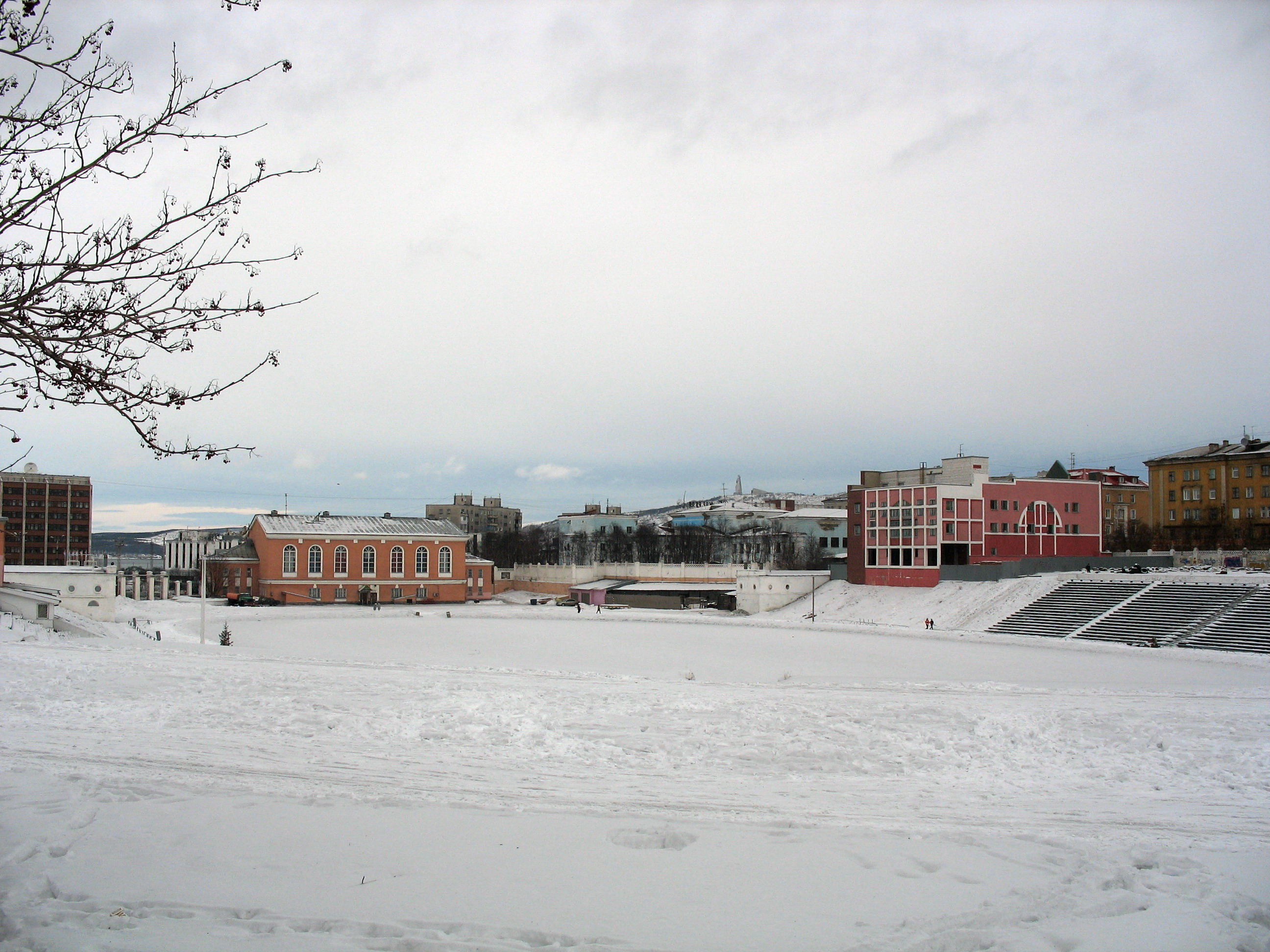
- Interactive map of Tsentralnyi Profsoyuz Stadion
- Location: Murmansk, Russia
- Coordinates: 68°58′25″N 33°04′58″E
- Capacity: 13,400
- Surface: Grass

Construction
- Opened: 1960

Tenant
- FC Sever Murmansk

The Trade Unions Central Stadium is a multi-use stadium in Murmansk, Russia. It is currently used mostly for football matches. The stadium holds 13,400 people. The stadium was built in 1960.

== Redevelopment plans ==
In 2022, plans for a PPP redevelopment of the stadium were presented.
