= FC Karelia-Discovery Petrozavodsk =

Russian football club

FC Karelia-Discovery
- Full name: Football Club Karelia-Discovery
- Founded: 1935
- Dissolved: 2011
- Ground: Spartak Stadium
- Capacity: 14,545
- League: Amateur Football League, Zone North-West
- 2010: 1st
Home colours	Away colours

FC Karelia-Discovery (Russian: «Карелия-Дискавери») is a former Russian football team from Petrozavodsk. As of 2009 till 2011, it played in the Amateur Football League.

== Team name history ==
- 1935 — 1941, 1944 — 1991 — «Spartak»
- 1992 — «Karelia»
- 1992 — «Karelia-Asmaral»
- 1993 — 1994 — «EDCI»
- 1996 — «Karelia-EDCI»
- 2001 — 2002 — «Karelia»
- 2003 — «United Russia — Karelia»
- 2003, 2006 — 2009 — «Karelia»
- 2009 — «Discovery-Karelia»
- 2009 — «Discovery»
- 2009 — 2011 — «Karelia-Discovery»

== Ultras ==
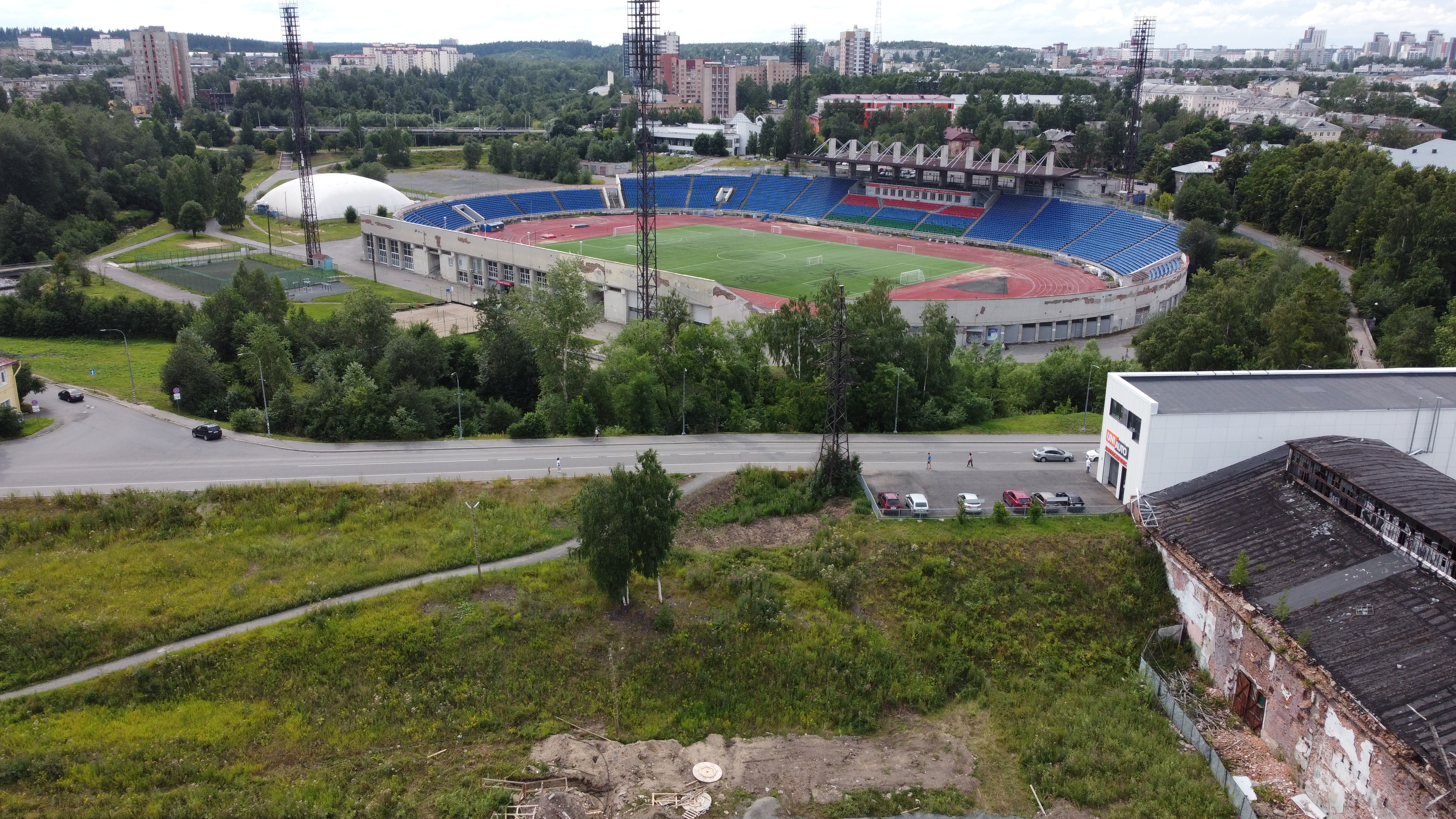
Stadium «Spartak»

Karelia-Discovery had two groups of fans: Crazy Karjala - fans who held traditional in Russia far-right political views and 2 Sector (2oi Сектор) - a rare group of fans in Russia who held anti-fascist views. The groups were at war with each other. In 2010, during the North-West Cup Final, about 150 Zenit St.Petersburg hooligans attacked anti-fascist fans of Karelia. The attackers used traumatic pistols and pepper gas. The match was interrupted. The replay took place a month later.

== See also ==
- FC Karelia Petrozavodsk
