= FC Rus Saint Petersburg =

- Founded: 2010
- Dissolved: 2014
- Ground: Minor Sport Arena of Petrovsky
- Capacity: 2,835
- Chairman: Aleksandr Yakimets
- Manager: Gennadi Bondaruk
- League: Russian Second Division
- 2013–14: 17th
| Home colours | Away colours |

FC Rus was a Russian football club from Saint Petersburg, founded in 2010. In 2011/12 season the team played in the Russian amateur championship, zone North-West and won the zonal tournament.

In 2012/13 season the team began to play in the Russian Second Division, after becoming a professional football club. Midway through the 2013/14 season, the team dropped out of the league due to lack of financing, releasing all players.

== Results ==
| Season | League | Place | Russian Cup | Notes |
|---|---|---|---|---|
| 2011/12 | Russian Amateur Football League, Zone «North-West» | 1st ▲ | | |
| 2012/13 | Russian Second Division, Zone «West» | 13 | 1/256 in Russian Cup | |
| 2013/14 | Russian Second Division, Zone «West» | 17 ▼ | 1/128 in Russian Cup | Withdrew from the league in February 2014 due to lack of financing |
