= Yevgeny Perevertaylo =

Russian footballer

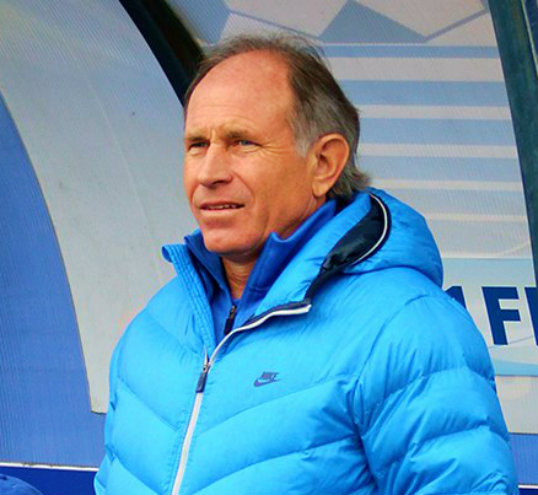
- Perevertaylo in 2014

Personal information
- Full name: Yevgeny Nikolayevich Perevertaylo
- Date of birth: 23 June 1955 (age 71)
- Place of birth: Novoselitskoye, Stavropol Krai, Russia
- Height: 1.73 m (5 ft 8 in)
- Position: Midfielder

Senior career*
Years	Team	Apps	(Gls)
1975	Dynamo Stavropol	0	(0)
1976	Spartak Oryol	3	(0)
1982	Mashuk Pyatigorsk	5	(0)
1983	Nart Cherkessk	1	(0)
1983–1985	Enerhiya Enerhodar (amateur)		
1986	Signal Izobilny (amateur)		
1988–1990	Signal Izobilny	70	(11)
1990–1991	Sherstyanik Nevinnomyssk	22	(2)
1992	Iskra Novoaleksandrovsk	12	(6)
1992	Arsenal Izobilny		
1992–1995	TJ Transporta Chrudim		
1995–1998	Signal Izobilny (amateur)		
2000–2003	Spartak-Kavkaztransgaz Izobilny	16	(0)

Managerial career
- 1986: Signal Izobilny
- 1990–1991: Sherstyanik Nevinnomyssk
- 1999: Signal Izobilny (assistant)
- 2000–2003: Spartak-Kavkaztransgaz Izobilny
- 2004: Kavkaztransgaz Izobilny
- 2004: Kavkaztransgaz Izobilny (assistant)
- 2005: SKA Rostov-on-Don
- 2007–2008: Astrakhan
- 2009: Mashuk-KMV Pyatigorsk
- 2009–2011: Nizhny Novgorod (assistant)
- 2011–2014: Baltika Kaliningrad
- 2014–2015: Tosno (assistant)
- 2015: Tosno
- 2015–2016: Ufa
- 2016: Sibir Novosibirsk
- 2017: Riga
- 2018: Dynamo Stavropol
- 2019–2020: Ufa (academy)
- 2020–2021: Dynamo Bryansk (assistant)
- 2021: Dynamo Bryansk
- 2021–2024: Murom
- 2024–2025: Murom
- * Club domestic league appearances and goals

Yevgeny Nikolayevich Perevertaylo (Russian: Евгений Николаевич Перевертайло; born 23 June 1955) is a Russian professional football coach and a former player.

== Club career ==
As a player, he made his debut in the Soviet Second League in 1982 for Mashuk Pyatigorsk.

== Personal life ==
His son Vladimir Perevertaylo is a former football player.
