= Pikalevo, Vladimir Oblast =

Pikalevo Пикалёво
- Village
- Location within Vladimir Oblast Location within Russia
- Coordinates: 56°35′N 38°30′E
- Country: Russia
- Region: Vladimir Oblast
- District: Alexandrovsky District
- Time zone: UTC+3:00

Pikalevo (Russian: Пикалёво) is a rural locality (a village) in Krasnoplamenskoye Rural Settlement, Alexandrovsky District, Vladimir Oblast, Russia. The population was 2 as of 2010. It is a very small settlement consisting of a single street.

== History ==
In the late 19th and early 20th centuries, the village was part of the Vishnyakovskaya Volost of the Pereslavl District, and since 1926, part of the Tiribrovskaya Volost of the Aleksandrovsky District. In 1859, the village had 6 households, in 1905 – 8 households, and in 1926 – 12 households.

Since 1929, the village was part of the Dudenevsky Village Council of the Aleksandrovsky District, since 1941 – part of the Struninsky District, since 1965 – part of the Aleksandrovsky District, since 1971 – part of the Obashevsky Village Council, and since 2005 – part of the Krasnoplamenskoye Rural Settlement.

== Geography ==
Pikalevo is located 48 km northwest of Alexandrov (the district's administrative centre) by road. Izmaylovo is the nearest rural locality.
