= Sergei Chikishev =

Russian football manager (born 1961)

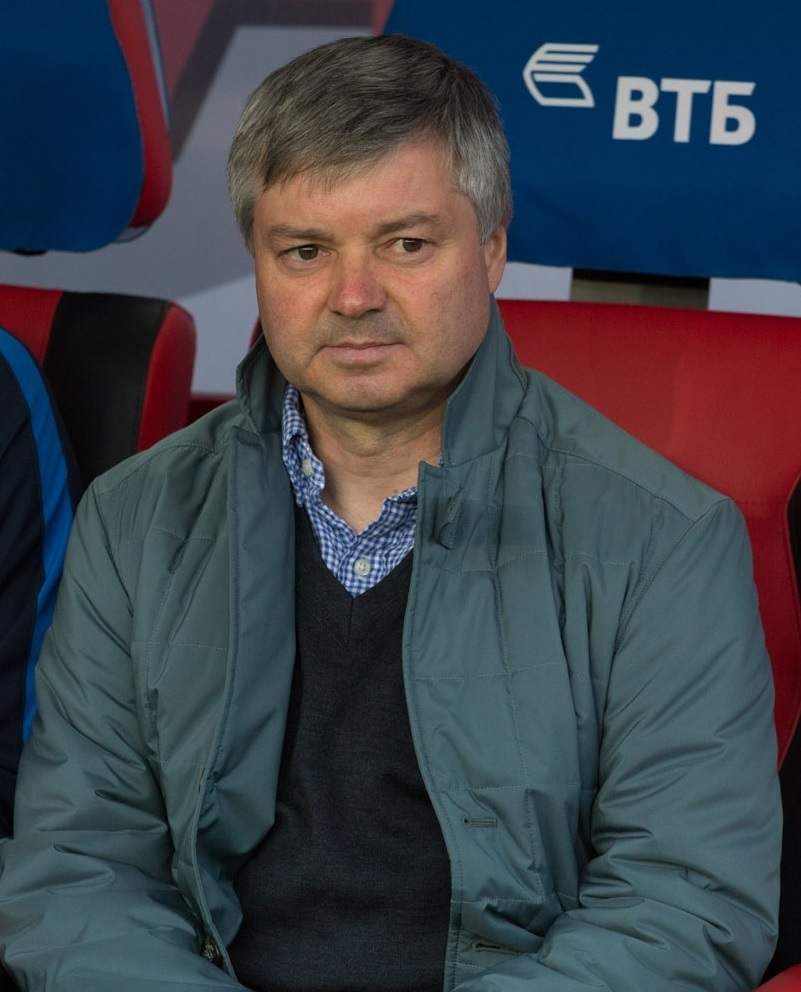
- Chikishev coaching Dynamo in 2016

Personal information
- Full name: Sergei Nikolayevich Chikishev
- Date of birth: 31 January 1961 (age 65)
- Place of birth: Omsk, Russian SFSR

Senior career*
Years	Team	Apps	(Gls)
1989	FC Molniya Omsk		

Managerial career
- 1995: Irtysh Omsk (assistant)
- 1999–2000: Irtysh Omsk (assistant)
- 2001: Tyumen (assistant)
- 2002: Irtysh Omsk (assistant)
- 2002–2004: Irtysh Omsk
- 2007–2010: Spartak Moscow (academy)
- 2011–2013: Dynamo Moscow (U21)
- 2013–2015: Dynamo Moscow (U21 assistant)
- 2015–2016: Dynamo Moscow (U21)
- 2016: Dynamo Moscow (caretaker)
- 2016: Dynamo-2 Moscow
- 2017–2019: Dynamo Moscow (academy)
- 2020: Pyunik (assistant)
- 2020–2021: Lori (assistant)
- 2021: FC Krasava Odintsovo (assistant)
- 2022: FC Chertanovo-2 Moscow
- 2022–2025: FC Chertanovo Moscow
- * Club domestic league appearances and goals

Sergei Nikolayevich Chikishev (Russian: Сергей Николаевич Чикишев; born 31 January 1961) is a Russian football manager and a former player.

== Coaching career ==
He led the Under-21 team of Dynamo Moscow to winning the Youth Championship of the Premier League teams in 2011–12 and 2013–14 seasons and was an assistant manager for the 2014–15 championship team.

In January 2020 he joined Armenian club Pyunik as an assistant to Roman Berezovsky.
