= Slantsy =

Slantsy (Russian: Сланцы) is the name of several inhabited localities in Russia.

Urban localities

- Slantsy, Leningrad Oblast, a town in Slantsevsky District of Leningrad Oblast; incorporated as Slantsevskoye Settlement Municipal Formation

Rural localities

- Slantsy, Saratov Oblast, a selo in Rtishchevsky District of Saratov Oblast
