= Pikalyovo, Leningrad Oblast =

Town in Leningrad Oblast, Russia

Pikalyovo Пикалёво
- Town
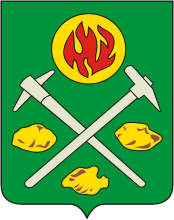
- Flag Coat of arms
- Interactive map of Pikalyovo
- Location of Pikalyovo Pikalyovo (Leningrad Oblast)
- Coordinates: 59°32′N 34°08′E
- Country: Russia
- Federal subject: Leningrad Oblast
- Administrative district: Boksitogorsky District
- Settlement municipal formationSelsoviet: Pikalyovskoye Settlement Municipal Formation
- First mentioned: 1620
- Town status since: December 9, 1954
- Elevation: 180 m (590 ft)

Population (2010 Census)
  - Total: 21,562
  - Estimate (2024): 20,161 (−6.5%)

Administrative status
  - Capital of: Pikalyovskoye Settlement Municipal Formation

Municipal status
  - Municipal district: Boksitogorsky Municipal District
  - Urban settlement: Pikalyovskoye Urban Settlement
  - Capital of: , Pikalyovskoye Urban Settlement
- Time zone: UTC+3 (MSK)
- Postal code: 187600–187602
- Dialing code: +7 81366
- OKTMO ID: 41603102001
- Website: pikadmin.ru

Pikalyovo (Russian: Пикалёво), sometimes Pikalevo (Russian: Пикалево), is a town in Boksitogorsky District of Leningrad Oblast, Russia, located 246 kilometers (153 mi) southeast of St. Petersburg and 25 kilometers (16 mi) east of Boksitogorsk. Population: 21,562 (2010 census); 23,325 (2002 census); 24,510 (1989 Soviet census).

== History ==
Voskresensky Luchensky Pogost, which is located within the current boundaries of the town, was presumably founded in the 12th or 13th century. At the time, it belonged to the Novgorod Republic. Pikalyovo was first mentioned by name in 1620. Eventually it became a village, and since 1906 the name was assigned to the newly built railway station on the railway connecting St. Petersburg and Vologda. Since the 18th century, Pikalyovo was part of Tikhvinsky Uyezd of Novgorod Governorate. In 1918, the uyezd was transferred to Cherepovets Governorate and between 1923 and 1927 Pikalyovo was the administrative center of Pikalyovskaya Volost. On August 1, 1927, the governorate was abolished and Pikalyovsky District with the administrative center in the selo of Pikalyovo was established as a part of Leningrad Okrug of Leningrad Oblast. In 1932, Pikalyovsky District was abolished. The current area of the town was split between Tikhvinsky and Yefimovsky Districts.

In 1935, the construction of a cement factory commenced. The settlement serving the factory was named Pikalyovo after the railway station. The cement plant was evacuated during World War II and after the war several industrial enterprises were built, including the aluminum oxide plant. In 1947, Pikalyovo was granted urban-type settlement status. On July 25, 1952, it was transferred to newly established Boksitogorsky District, and on December 9, 1954, it was granted town status. In 1992, it became the town of oblast significance. In 2010, the administrative division of Leningrad Oblast was harmonized with the municipal division, and Pikalyovo was made the town of district significance.

Pikalyovo was strongly hit by economic crises of the 1990s and the first decade of the 2000s. In one infamous episode, in 2009, about three hundred inhabitants blocked the highway between St. Petersburg and Vologda to protest wage retardation. Vladimir Putin, the then-Prime Minister of Russia, flew to Pikalyovo and, without going through any legal procedures, ordered Oleg Deripaska, the plant owner, to pay out the debts immediately.

== Administrative and municipal status ==
Within the framework of administrative divisions, it is incorporated within Boksitogorsky District as Pikalyovskoye Settlement Municipal Formation. As a municipal division, Pikalyovskoye Settlement Municipal Formation is incorporated within Boksitogorsky Municipal District as Pikalyovskoye Urban Settlement.

== Economy ==
=== Industry ===
The town's industry was composed of a Rusal aluminum oxide plant, by-producing sodium bicarbonate and potassium bicarbonate, a cement factory, and a timber-processing plant.

=== Transportation ===
A-114 Vologda - New Ladoga autoroute passes 3 kilometers (1.9 mi) south of Pikalyovo. Autoroutes H-9 (Pikalyovo–Zarechye) and H-7 (Pikalyovo–Kolbeki) pass directly through the town.

Pikalyovo is located on the railroad connecting St. Petersburg and Vologda. There are three railway stations in the town: Pikalyovo-1, Pikalyovo2-, and Obrinsky.

Both intra- and intercity bus services are available in Pikalyovo.

== Culture and recreation ==
Pikalyovo hosts two museums. The Pikalyovo Local Museum shows mostly ethnographic collections. There is also a museum of aluminum oxide plant, which concentrates on the history of the town.

== Sports ==
The town's Delfin swimming pool was the location of seven Soviet and three Russian championships, where fifty-seven world and European records were set.

The town's association football team, FC Metallurg Pikalyovo, plays in the Leningrad Oblast championships.

Also available are a sport complex, an illuminated ski line, a sports school for children, ice-hockey areas, "Metallurg" stadium, and heavy athletics hall.

== Twin towns and sister cities ==
Pikalyovo is twinned with:

- Maardu, Estonia
- Pitkyaranta, Russia

== Notable people ==
- Mikhail Gorsheniov (1973-2013) — Russian musician, lead singer and composer of Russian band Korol i Shut
- Dmitriy Chistyakov (1994) — Russian footballer
- Oleg Salnikov (1975) — Russian footballer
