= FC Berezniki =

Russian football team

- Full name: Football Club Berezniki
- Founded: 1958
- Dissolved: 2002

FC Berezniki (Russian: ФК «Березники») was a Russian football team from Berezniki. It played professionally in 1958, 1960 to 1970 and 2001. Their best result was 9th spot in the Zone IV Russian SFSR of the Soviet First League in 1960.

== Team name and location history ==
- 1947–1970: FC Khimik Berezniki
- 1971–1991: did not exist
- 1992–1993: FC Sodovik Berezniki
- 1994–1998: did not exist
- 1999–2000: FC Titan Berezniki
- 2001: FC Berezniki
