= Arsen Papikyan =

Russian footballer (born 1972)

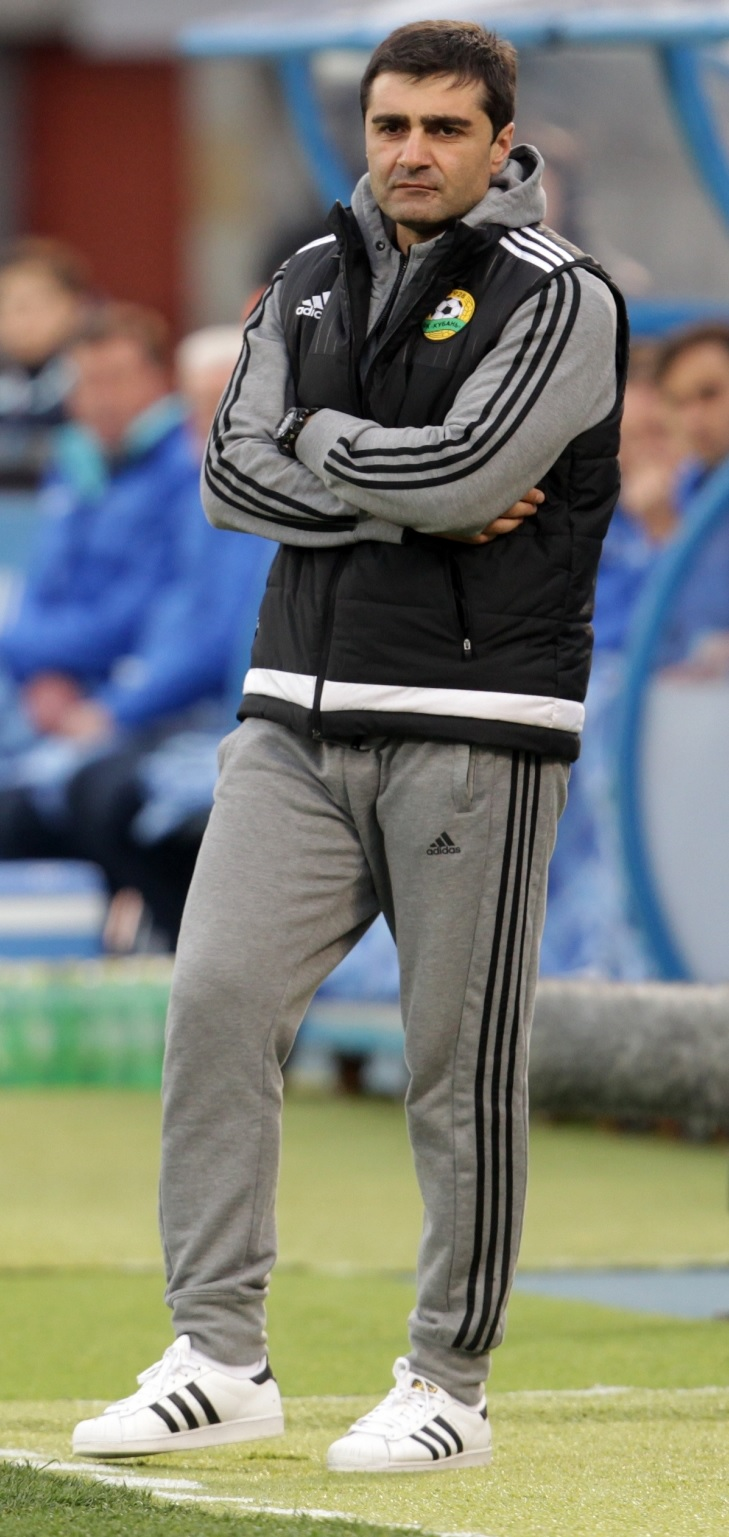
- Papikyan managing Kuban in 2016

Personal information
- Full name: Arsen Borisovich Papikyan
- Date of birth: 1 January 1972 (age 54)
- Place of birth: Armavir, Russian SFSR
- Height: 1.80 m (5 ft 11 in)
- Positions: Defender; midfielder

Team information
- Current team: Sochi (asst coach)

Youth career
- ShISP Stavropol

Senior career*
Years	Team	Apps	(Gls)
1989–1990	Nart Cherkessk	58	(0)
1991–1992	Dynamo Stavropol	55	(0)
1992	Dynamo Izobilny	1	(0)
1993–1994	Dynamo Stavropol	43	(0)
1995	Chernomorets Novorossiysk	8	(0)
1995–1996	Dynamo Stavropol	23	(0)
1997	Torpedo Armavir	30	(0)
1998	Kuzbass Kemerovo	7	(0)
1998	Vityaz Shpakovskoye		
1999	Dynamo Krasnodar		
2000	KAMAZ-Chally Naberezhnye Chelny	30	(2)
2001	Nart Cherkessk (amateur)		
2002–2003	Zhemchuzhina Budyonnovsk	70	(0)
2004	Spartak Kostroma	26	(0)

Managerial career
- 2009–2013: Torpedo Armavir
- 2013–2016: Kuban Krasnodar (assistant)
- 2016: Kuban Krasnodar (caretaker)
- 2016–2020: Armavir
- 2020–2025: Krylia Sovetov Samara (assistant)
- 2025–: Sochi (assistant)
- * Club domestic league appearances and goals

Arsen Borisovich Papikyan (Russian: Арсен Борисович Папикян; born 1 January 1972) is a Russian professional football manager and a former player. He is an assistant coach with Sochi. He is of Armenian descent.

== Career ==
As a player, Papikyan made his debut in the Soviet Second League in 1989 for Nart Cherkessk. He was manager of Russian club Armavir from 2016 until the club went bankrupt and folded on 15 April 2020.
