= Russian Amateur Football League =

D5 of the Russian football league system, D5 in 1994–1997

Russian championship among amateur football clubs (III division) (Russian: Первенство России среди любительских футбольных клубов (III дивизион)), from 2024 known as Russian Third League, is the fifth overall tier of the Russian football league system. Sometimes it is called Amateur Football League, after the organization that holds the competition (Russian: Любительская Футбольная Лига). The league has amateur/semi-pro status. At the end of each season ten teams are promoted from the Amateur Football League to the fully-professional Second Division Division B. Bottom-ranked teams in Moscow Oblast and Siberia may be relegated to the second (fifth tier). The league is divided into ten regional divisions. From 1994 to 1997, a professional fourth-level Russian Third League existed.

== Far East ==
Champions:

- 1987 – FC Montazhnik Yakutsk
- 1991 – FC Lokomotiv Ussuriysk
- 1992 – FC Portovik Vladivostok
- 1994 – FC Voskhod Vladivostok
- 1995 – FC Rybak Starodubskoye
- 1996 – FC Portovik Vladivostok
- 1997 – FC Gornyak Raychikhinsk
- 1998 – FC Viktoriya Komsomolsk-on-Amur
- 1999 – FC Viktoriya Komsomolsk-on-Amur
- 2000 – FC Viktoriya Komsomolsk-on-Amur
- 2001 – FC Portovik Kholmsk
- 2002 – FC Neftyanik Nogliki
- 2003 – FC Portovik Kholmsk
- 2004 – FC Portovik Kholmsk
- 2005 – FC Portovik Kholmsk
- 2006 – FC Sakhalin Yuzhno-Sakhalinsk
- 2007 – FC Portovik-Energiya Kholmsk
- 2008 – FC LuTEK Luchegorsk
- 2009 – FC LuTEK-Energiya Luchegorsk
- 2010 – FC LuTEK-Energiya Luchegorsk
- 2012 – FC LuTEK-Energiya Luchegorsk
- 2012 – FC LuTEK-Energiya Luchegorsk (transitional)
- 2013 – FC LuTEK-Energiya Luchegorsk
- 2014 – FC Belogorsk
- 2015 – FC Dalstroyindustriya Komsomolsk
- 2016 – FC Belogorsk
- 2017 – FC Nogliki
- 2018 – FC Nogliki
- 2019 – FC Nogliki

== Siberia ==
Champions:

- 1991 – FC Metallurg Aldan (Group 1) / FC Neftianik Urai (Group 2)
- 1992 – FC Motor Prokopyevsk
- 1993 – FC Dorozhnik Uyar
- 1994 – FC Viktoriya Nazarovo
- 1995 – FC Yantar Seversk
- 1996 – FC Atom Zheleznogorsk
- 1997 – FC Sibiryak Bratsk
- 1998 – FC Reformatsiya Abakan
- 1999 – FC Olimpik Novosibirsk
- 2000 – FC Chkalovets-1936 Novosibirsk
- 2001 – FC Torpedo-Alttrak Rubtsovsk
- 2002 – FC Energis Irkutsk
- 2003 – FC Shakhta Raspadskaya Mezhdurechensk
- 2004 – FC Chkalovets Novosibirsk
- 2005 – FC Raspadskaya Mezhdurechensk
- 2006 – FC Raspadskaya Mezhdurechensk
- 2007 – FC Raspadskaya Mezhdurechensk
- 2008 – FC Dynamo Biysk
- 2009 – FC Dynamo Biysk
- 2010 – FC Raspadskaya Mezhdurechensk
- 2012 – FC Dynamo Biysk
- 2013 – FC Shakhta Raspadskaya Mezhdurechensk
- 2013 – FC Metallurg Novokuznetsk (transitional)
- 2014 – FC Restavratsiya Krasnoyarsk
- 2015 – FC Restavratsiya Krasnoyarsk
- 2016 – FC Restavratsiya Krasnoyarsk
- 2017 – FC Novokuznetsk
- 2018 – FC Novokuznetsk
- 2019 – FC Novokuznetsk
- 2020 – None
- 2021 – FC Raspadskaya Mezhdurechensk
- 2022 – FC Irkutsk
- 2023 – FC Polimer Barnaul
- 2024 – FC Temp Barnaul
- 2025 – FC Temp Barnaul

== Ural and West Siberia ==
Champions:

- 1991 – FC Gornyak Kachkanar
- 1998 – FC RTI Yekaterinburg
- 1999 – FC Titan Berezniki
- 2000 – FC Titan Berezniki
- 2001 – FC Lukoil Chelyabinsk
- 2002 – FC Tobol Kurgan
- 2003 – FC Metallurg Zlatoust
- 2004 – FC Tyumen
- 2005 – FC Tyumen
- 2006 – FC Magnitogorsk
- 2007 – FC Gornyak Uchaly
- 2008 – FC Torpedo Miass
- 2009 – FC Torpedo Miass
- 2010 – FC Torpedo Miass
- 2012 – FC Tobol Tobolsk
- 2013 – FC Metallurg Asha (transitional)
- 2013 – FC Metallurg Asha
- 2014 – FC Metallurg Asha
- 2015 – FC Metallurg Asha
- 2016 – FC Ural-2 Yekaterinburg
- 2017 – FC Metallurg Asha
- 2018 – FC Metallurg Asha
- 2019 – FC Metallurg Asha
- 2020 – FC Torpedo Miass
- 2021 – FC Metallurg Magnitogorsk
- 2022 – FC Uralets-TS Nizhny Tagil
- 2023 – FC Metallurg Asha
- 2024 – FC Metallurg Magnitogorsk
- 2025 – FC Ilpar Perm Krai

== Saint Petersburg ==
Champions:

- 2023 – FC Konstantinovskoye Saint Petersburg
- 2024 – SSHOR 1-Kristall-Konstantinovskoye Saint Petersburg
- 2025 – SSH 1-Kristall-Konstantinovskoye Saint Petersburg

== North West ==
Champions:

- 1991 – FC Lokomotiv Leningrad (as in North)
- 1998 – FC Oazis Yartsevo
- 1999 – FC Pskov
- 2000 – FC Svetogorets Svetogorsk
- 2001 – FC Kondopoga
- 2002 – FC Pikalyovo
- 2003 – FC Baltika-Tarko Kaliningrad
- 2004 – FC Lokomotiv St. Petersburg
- 2005 – FC Baltika-2 Kaliningrad
- 2006 – FC Apatit Kirovsk
- 2007 – FC Sever Murmansk
- 2008 – FC Torpedo St. Petersburg
- 2009 – FC Apatit Kirovsk
- 2010 – FC Khimik Koryazhma
- 2012 – FC Rus Saint Petersburg
- 2013 – FC Zvezda Saint Petersburg
- 2013 – FC Zvezda Saint Petersburg
- 2014 – FC Karelia Petrozavodsk
- 2015 - FC Zvezda Saint Petersburg
- 2016 – FC Zvezda Saint Petersburg
- 2017 – FC Zvezda Saint Petersburg
- 2018 – FC Khimik Koryazhma
- 2019 – FC Market Sveta Saint Petersburg
- 2020 – FC Dynamo Saint Petersburg
- 2021 – FC Yadro Saint Petersburg
- 2022 – FC Sever Murmansk
- 2023 – FC Sever Murmansk
- 2024 – FC Sever Murmansk
- 2025 – Tosno Saint Petersburg

== Moscow ==
Champions:

- 1998 – FC Spartak-Chukotka Moscow
- 1999 – FC Moskabelmet Moscow
- 2000 – FC Torpedo-ZIL Moscow (youth)
- 2001 – FC Mostransgaz Selyatino
- 2002 – FC Nosorogi Volodarskogo
- 2003 – FC Almaz Moscow
- 2004 – FC Presnya Moscow
- 2005 – FC Torpedo-RG Moscow
- 2006 – FC Zelenograd
- 2007 – FC Spartak-Avto Moscow
- 2008 – FC Spartak-Avto Moscow
- 2009 – FC Torpedo Moscow
- 2010 – FC KAIT-Sport Moscow
- 2012 – FC Prialit Reutov
- 2012 – FC Zelenograd (transitional)
- 2013 – FC Zelenograd
- 2014 – FC Zelenograd
- 2015 – FC Zelenograd
- 2016 – FC Troitsk
- 2017 – FC Rosich Moscow
- 2018 – FC Rosich Moscow
- 2019 – FC Rosich Moscow
- 2020 – FC Rosich Moscow
- 2021 – FC Rosich Moscow
- 2022 – FC Rosich Moscow
- 2023 – FC Uralets Moscow
- 2024 – FC Zelenograd
- 2025 – FC Germes Moscow

== Moscow Oblast ==
Champions:

- 1997 – FC Gigant Voskresensk
- 1998 – FC Vityaz Podolsk
- 1999 – FC Krasnoznamensk-Selyatino
- 2000 –

- Group A – FC Vityaz Podolsk
- Group B – CYSS Khimki

- 2001 – FC Reutov
- 2002 – FC Lobnya-Alla Lobnya
- 2003 – FC Lobnya-Alla Lobnya
- 2004 – FC Lokomotiv-Mosotryad No. 99 Protvino
- 2005 –

- Group A – FC Fortuna Mytishchi
- Group B – FC Dmitrov

- 2006 –

- Group A – FC Znamya Truda Orekhovo-Zuyevo
- Group B – FC Titan Klin

- 2007 –

- Group A – FC Istra
- Group B – FC Senezh Solnechnogorsk

- 2008 – FC Avangard Podolsk
- 2009 –

- Group A – FC Zorkiy Krasnogorsk
- Group B – FC Mytishchi

- 2010 –

- Group A – FC Podolye Voronovo
- Group B – FC Oka Beloomut

- 2012 –

- Group A – FC Dolgoprudniy
- Group B – FC Znamya Noginsk

- 2012 (Transitional) –

- Group A – FC Kolomna
- Group B – FC Povarovo

- 2013 – FC Olimpik Mytishchi
- 2014 – FC Titan Klin
- 2015 – FC Lyubertsy
- 2016 – FC Olimpik Mytishchi
- 2017 – FC Kvant Obninsk
- 2018 – FC Lyubertsy
- 2019 – FC Olimp-2 Khimki
- 2020 – FC Legion Ivanteyevka
- 2021 – FC Balashikha
- 2022 – FC Zorky Krasnorgorsk-2
- 2023 – FC Podolye Chekhov
- 2024 – FC Krasnoye Znamya Noginsk
- 2025 – FC Krasnoye Znamya Noginsk

== Golden Ring ==
Champions:

- 1998 – FC Kovrovets Kovrov
- 1998 – FC Mashinostroitel Kirov
- 1999 – FC Severstal Cherepovets
- 2000 – FC Torpedo Vladimir
- 2001 – FC BSK Spirovo
- 2002 – FC Ratmir Tver
- 2003 – FC Volga Tver
- 2004 – FC MZhK Ryazan
- 2005 – FC Ryazanskaya GRES Novomichurinsk
- 2006 – FC Kooperator Vichuga
- 2007 – FC Kooperator Vichuga
- 2008 – FC Dynamo Kostroma
- 2009 – FC Kooperator Vichuga
- 2010 – FC Kooperator Vichuga
- 2012 – FC Kooperator Vichuga
- 2012 – FC Dynamo Kostroma (transitional)
- 2013 – FC Dynamo Kostroma
- 2014 – FC Shinnik-M Yaroslavl
- 2015 – FC Dynamo Kostroma
- 2016 – FC Murom
- 2017 – FC Cherepovets
- 2018 – FC Fakel Kirov
- 2019 – FC Cherepovets
- 2020 – FC Vologda
- 2021 – FC Dynamo Vologda
- 2022 – FC Dynamo Kirov
- 2023 – FC KSSS Kirovo-Chepetsk
- 2024 – FC Cherepovets-SSHOR Vityaz
- 2025 – FC Fankom Kirov

== Centre (South-West Region) ==
Champions:

- 1998 – FC Oskol Stary Oskol
- 1999 – FC Yelets
- 2000 – FC Salyut-Energia Belgorod
- 2001 – FC Magnit Zheleznogorsk
- 2002 – FC Tekstilshchik Kamyshin
- 2003 – FC Rotor-2 Volgograd
- 2004 – FC Lokomotiv Liski
- 2005 – FC Dynamo Voronezh
- 2006 – FC Torpedo Volzhsky
- 2007 – FC Zodiak Stary Oskol
- 2008 – FC Fakel-StroyArt Voronezh
- 2009 – FC MiK Kaluga
- 2010 – FC Yelets
- 2012 – FC Khimik Rossosh
- 2013 – FC Dynamo Bryansk
- 2013 – FC Vybor Kurbatov (transitional)
- 2014 – FC Energomash Belgorod
- 2015 – FC Rotor Volgograd
- 2016 – FC Atom Novovoronezh
- 2017 – FC Metallurg-Oskol Stary Oskol
- 2018 – FC Metallurg-OEMK Stary Oskol
- 2019 – FC Krasny
- 2020 – FC Lokomotiv Liski
- 2021 – FC Lokomotiv Liski
- 2022 – FC Atom Novovoronezh
- 2023 – FC Metallurg-Oskol Stary Oskol
- 2024 – FC Lokomotiv Liski
- 2025 – FC Kristall-MEZT Borisoglebsk

== Privolzhye (Volga Region) ==
Champions:

- 1991 – FC Tekstilschik Isheyevka (Group 1) / FC Trikotazhnik Astrakhan (Group 2) (both as in Povolzhye)
- 1998 – FC Metallurg Vyksa
- 1999 – FC Yoshkar-Ola
- 2000 – FC Alnas Almetyevsk
- 2001 – FC Zenit Penza
- 2002 – FC Lokomotiv Nizhny Novgorod
- 2003 – FC Rubin-2 Kazan
- 2004 – FC Naberezhnye Chelny
- 2005 – FC Yunit Samara
- 2006 – FC Sokol-Saratov
- 2007 – FC Khimik Dzerzhinsk
- 2008 – FC RossKat Neftegorsk
- 2009 – FC Zenit Penza
- 2010 – FC Syzran-2003 Syzran
- 2012 – FC Spartak Yoshkar-Ola
- 2012 – FC Shakhtyor Volga-Olimpinets (transitional)
- 2013 – FC Shakhtyor Volga-Olimpinets
- 2014 – FC Sergiyevsk
- 2015 – FC Sergiyevsk
- 2016 – FC Dzherzhinsk-TS
- 2017 – FC Torpedo Dimitrovgrad
- 2018 – FC Khimik-Avgust Vurnary
- 2019 – FC Khimik-Avgust Vurnary
- 2020 – FC Dorozhnik Kamenka
- 2021 – FC Khimik-Avgust Vurnary
- 2022 – FC Dorozhnik Kamenka
- 2023 – FC Dorozhnik Kamenka
- 2024 – FC Shumbrat Saransk
- 2025 – FC Shumbrat Saransk

== South ==
Champions:

- 1996 – FC Avangard Kamyshin
- 1997 – FC Sudostroitel Astrakhan
- 1998 – FC SKA Rostov-on-Don
- 1999 – FC Signal Izobilny
- 2000 – FC Lokomotiv-Taym Mineralnye Vody
- 2001 – FC Nart Cherkessk
- 2002 – FC Mashuk Pyatigorsk
- 2003 – FC Aruan Nartkala
- 2004 – FC Avangard Lazarevskoye
- 2005 – FC Chernomorets Novorossiysk
- 2006 – FC Bataysk-2007
- 2007 – FC Nika Krasny Sulin
- 2008 – FC Abinsk
- 2009 – FC Malka
- 2010 – FC Biolog Novokubansk
- 2012 – FC Volgar Astrakhan
- 2013 – FC Dynamo Rostov-on-Don
- 2013 – FC Dynamo Sbornaya Stavropol (transitional)
- 2014 – FC SKA Rostov-on-Don
- 2015 – FC Volgar Astrakhan
- 2016 – FC Sbornaya RO Rostselmash
- 2017 – FC Akhmat Khosi-Yurt Tsentaroy
- 2018 – FC Maras-IngGU Nazran
- 2019 – FC Aksay
- 2020 – FC StavropolAgroSoyuz Nevinnomyssk
- 2021 – FC Energetik Prokhladny
- 2022 – FC Pobeda Khasavyurt
- 2023 – FC Stroitel Kamensk-Shakhtinsky
- 2024 – FC StavropolAgroSoyuz Nevinnomyssk
- 2025 – FC StavropolAgroSoyuz Nevinnomyssk

== See also ==
- Crimean Premier League
