= FC Torpedo Pavlovo =

- Full name: Football Club Torpedo Pavlovo
- Founded: 1961
- Dissolved: 2006
- League: Amateur Football League, Zone Privolzhye
- 2005: 5th

FC Torpedo Pavlovo (Russian: «Торпедо» (Павлово)) was a Russian football team from Pavlovo. It played professionally in 1961–1970 and 1992–2003. Their best result was 9th place in Zone 5 of the Soviet First League in 1961 (they also played on that level in 1962).
