= FC Burevestnik-YuRGUES Shakhty =

- Full name: Football Club Burevestnik-YuRGUES Shakhty
- Founded: 1958
- Dissolved: 2007
- League: Amateur Football League, Zone South
- 2006: 3rd

FC Burevestnik-YuRGUES Shakhty (Russian: «Буревестник‑ЮРГУЭС» (Шахты)) was a Russian football team from Shakhty. It played professionally in 1958–1969 and 1989–2003. It played in the second-highest Soviet First League from 1958 to 1962, where its best result was 4th place in Zone 4 in 1961.

== Team name history ==
- 1958–2004: FC Shakhtyor Shakhty
- 2005–2006: FC Burevestnik-YuRGUES Shakhty
