= FC Nemkom Krasnodar =

- Full name: Football Club Nemkom Krasnodar
- Founded: 2000
- Dissolved: 2003

FC Nemkom Krasnodar (Russian: «Немком» (Краснодар)) was a Russian football team from Krasnodar. It played professionally for a single season in 2002 in the Russian Second Division, taking 18th place in the Zone South, the club was relegated back to amateur level and subsequently disbanded.
