= FC Tosno =

Tosno
- Full name: Football Club Tosno
- Founded: 2013
- Dissolved: 2018
- Ground: Petrovsky Stadium, Saint Petersburg
- Capacity: 21,405
- 2025: Russian Third League, 1st of 16 (promoted)
- Website: fctosno.ru
Home colours	Away colours

FC Tosno (Russian: ФК Тосно) was a professional Russian football club based in Tosno, Leningrad Oblast. Founded in 2013, Tosno won promotion to the Russian Premier League on 6 May 2017 after securing second place in the Russian National Football League. The following season, they won the Russian Cup.

However, Tosno's relegation to second division football worsened the club's economic troubles, leading to its dissolution.

== History ==
FC Tosno was officially registered in 2008 by Leonid Khomenko, then director of 'FC Era'. In 2009, FC Tosno and another amateur club, 'Ruan', were merged. The name 'Ruan' was carried by the club till late 2013.

=== Foundation ===
The decision to found a professional club was taken in March 2013, with the support of the club's main sponsor at the time, a holding company named 'Fort Group', and the Regional Public Organization, 'FC Tosno'. Since 2013, FC Tosno have represented the Leningrad Oblast in Russian competitions. In Tosno's first professional season, the club were declared to compete in the West Zone of the Russian Professional Football League. Due to Tosno's then-current home stadium (Tosno Stadium)'s failing to satisfy PFL's minimum requirements, it was required that they move to a different, more capacious stadium for them to be eligible to compete in the division. In the meantime, Tosno were offered to play their home matches at the Petrovskiy Stadium.

The club's first official match took place on 10 July 2013, when they defeated FC Dynamo Vologda in the First Round of the 2013–14 Russian Cup (they reached the quarter-finals that year). This victory marked the start of the club's 22-game 'unbeaten run' in all competitions (18 league games and 4 cup games), which ended on the 27th of October. The following day, head coach Viktor Demidov's contact with the club had terminated. The remaining games of the season had keepers' coach Kirill Gashichev in charge.

=== PFL Years (2013–14) ===
==== Russian Cup ====
Tosno's last logo

After signing a contract with Ukrainian manager Oleh Leshchynskyi on 4 March 2014, FC Tosno defeated FC Spartak Moscow in the 2013–14 Russian Cup Round of 16, with the only goal scored by Valentin Filatov on the 114th minute. It was the fourth time in Russian Cup's history, when a team from the Second Division had participated in the Russian Cup's Quarter-finals.

On 26 March 2014, 'Tosno' were eliminated from the cup in an away game against Krasnodar, which ended 3–0 to the hosts.

On 15 May, Leshchynskyi was fired due to a conflict with the club's players, so Vyacheslav Matyushenko, the team's chairman, had to head the team. On 27 May, after a 1–0 win against FC Tekstilshchik Ivanovo in PFL, FC Tosno had secured a place in the Russian National Football League of the upcoming season.

=== FNL Years (2014–17) ===
Prior to the season's start, Tosno had signed a contract with Bulgarian manager Nikolay Kostov. The first four games were headed by Kirill Gashichev, however, on 30 July Kostov had been officially included in the squad. Tosno had topped the league for the time of Nikolay Kostov's leadership, however, on 5 November the contract with Kostov had terminated and Kirill Gashichev had to head Tosno again. In 2014, under the leadership of Gashichev, the club had finished third with four wins and one loss.

On 4 December 2014, Aleksandr Grigoryan was appointed the club's new manager on a two-year contract, however Grigoryan left the club on 28 February 2015 without taking charge of first team game for the club due to family circumstances.

The manager post was then passed to Yevgeni Perevertailo, who guided Tosno to a third-place finish in the league. However, Tosno lost 1:5 on aggregate to Rostov in the play-offs and did not earn promotion to the Russian Premier League.

On 12 August 2015, Dmytro Parfenov was appointed as Tosno's new manager on a two-year contract. Tosno finished the season in 7th position and reached the Round of 16 in the Russian Cup, where the club lost only to future champions Zenit.

At the end of the 2016–17 season, Tosno have earned promotion to the 2017–18 Russian Premier League for the first time.

=== RFPL Year (2017–2018) ===
The 2017–18 season was Tosno's first ever top-tier campaign in Russian football. The club spent much of the league stage of the season struggling in relegation or relegation-playoff places. The cup, on the other hand, saw the team enjoy vast success, reaching the final after defeating reigning champions FC Spartak Moscow in a match that saw them fight back from a one-goal deficit in regular time to seal a close victory in penalty shoot-outs. They went on to win the final on 9 May 2018, netting two goals and conceding once in a FC Avangard Kursk triumph.

As a consequence of winning the cup, Tosno were qualified to represent Russia in the following season's Europa League group stage, pending UEFA licensing, which would have marked the club's first ever appearance in a major European competition. However, immediately following the cup victory, Russian Football Union president Aleksandr Alayev announced that Tosno had missed the deadlines for UEFA licensing applications and would therefore not be eligible to participate in the competition. They were relegated from the Russian Premier League on the last day of the 2017–18 season after losing 0–5 to FC Ufa.

=== Domestic history ===
Season	League									Russian Cup	Top goalscorer		Manager
Season	Div.	Pos.	Pl.	W	D	L	GS	GA	P	Russian Cup	Name	League	Manager
2013–14	3rd West	1st	32	21	8	3	51	16	71	Quarterfinal	Aleksandr Savin	12	(Russia) Viktor Demidov (Russia) Kirill Gashichev (Caretaker) (Ukraine) Oleh Leshchynskyi (Belarus) Vyacheslav Matyushenko (Russia) Kirill Gashichev (Caretaker)
2014–15	2nd	3rd	34	20	5	9	50	36	65	Round of 16	Batraz Khadartsev	7	(Russia) Kirill Gashichev (Caretaker) (Bulgaria) Nikolay Kostov (Russia) Kirill Gashichev (Caretaker) (Armenia) Aleksandr Grigoryan (Russia) Yevgeny Perevertaylo
2015–16	2nd	7th	38	17	4	17	57	53	55	Round of 16	Vladimir Ilyin	12	(Russia) Yevgeny Perevertaylo (Ukraine) Dmytro Parfenov
2016–17	2nd	2nd	38	21	12	5	63	30	75	Quarterfinal	Anton Zabolotny	16	(Ukraine) Dmytro Parfenov
2017–18	1st	15th	30	6	6	18	23	54	24	Winner	Yevgeni Markov	8	(Ukraine) Dmytro Parfenov

== Stadium ==
In November 2014, it was announced that FC Tosno are planning to build a new home stadium in Tosno. Its capacity was expected to be over 10,000 seats and it was to be completed before the start of the 2015–16 season. Those plans were not realised.

In the 2017–18 season, the club played their home games at the Petrovsky stadium in St. Petersburg, which previously hosted the home matches of FC Zenit. The stadium has a capacity of 20,985.

== Honours ==
- Russian Cup
  - Winners (1): 2017–18
- Russian Professional Football League
  - Champions (1): 2013–14 (West Zone)

== Timeline of head coaches ==
Number represents chronological order.
Information correct as of May 2018.

Number	Period	Manager	Duration	Reason for leaving
1	March 2013 – October 2013	Viktor Demidov	7 months	Contract terminated
2	October 2013 – March 2014	Kirill Gashichev	5 months	Replaced by professional manager
3	March 2014 – May 2014	Oleh Leshchynskyi	2 months	Fired due to conflict with players
4	May 2014 – June 2014	Vyacheslav Matyushenko	1 month	Replaced by Kirill Gashichev
5	June 2014 – August 2014	Kirill Gashichev	2 months	Replaced by professional manager
6	August 2014 – November 2014	Nikolay Kostov	3 months	Contract terminated
7	November 2014 – December 2014	Kirill Gashichev	1 month	Replaced by professional manager
8	December 2014 – February 2015	Aleksandr Grigoryan	3 months	Family circumstances
9	February 2015 – July 2015	Yevgeni Perevertailo	2 months	Mutual agreement
10	August 2015 – June 2018	Dmytro Parfenov	2 years 10 months	Dissolve of FC Tosno

== Notable players ==
Had international caps for their respective countries. Players whose name is listed in bold represented their countries while playing for Tosno.

Russia

- (Russia) Vladimir Bystrov
- (Russia) Arseny Logashov
- (Russia) Georgi Melkadze
- (Russia) Pavel Pogrebnyak
- (Russia) Yegor Sorokin
- (Russia) **Anton Zabolotny**

Europe

- (Armenia) David Yurchenko
- (Belarus) **Dzyanis Laptsew**
- (Croatia) Ante Vukušić
- (Georgia (country)) **Otar Martsvaladze**
- (Georgia (country)) **Giorgi Navalovski**
- (Georgia (country)) **Nukri Revishvili**
- (Montenegro) **Mladen Kašćelan**
- (Montenegro) Nemanja Mijušković
- (Poland) Marcin Kowalczyk
- (Serbia) Marko Poletanović
- (Ukraine) Artem Milevskyi

Africa

- (Cape Verde) **Nuno Rocha**

Asia

- (Uzbekistan) Vagiz Galiulin
