= FC Baltika-Tarko Kaliningrad =

Russian football club

- Full name: Football Club Baltika-Tarko Kaliningrad
- Founded: 1999
- Dissolved: 2005

FC Baltika-Tarko Kaliningrad (Russian: ФК «Балтика-Тарко» Калининград) was a Russian football team from Kaliningrad. It played professionally for one season in the Russian Second Division in 2004, when in came 15th in the West Zone. It was cooperating with FC Baltika Kaliningrad as its farm club, but was not formally owned by FC Baltika. After the 2004 season it was dissolved.

== Team name and location history ==
- 1999–2001: FC Tarko Kaliningrad
- 2002–2004: FC Baltika-Tarko Kaliningrad
