= FC BSK Spirovo =

- Full name: Football Club Baltiyskaya Stroitelnaya Kompaniya Spirovo
- Founded: 2001
- Dissolved: 2006

FC BSK Spirovo (Russian: БСК (Спирово)) was a Russian football team from Spirovo. It played professionally in the Russian Second Division from 2002 to 2004. Their best result was 7th place in West Zone in 2002.
