= FC Metallurg Pikalyovo =

- Full name: Football Club Metallurg Pikalyovo
- Founded: 1968
- Dissolved: 2006
- League: Amateur Football League, Zone North-West
- 2005: 6th

FC Metallurg Pikalyovo (Russian: Металлург Пикалёво) was a Russian football team from Pikalyovo, Leningrad Oblast. It played professionally in 1968–1969, 1994–1995 and 2003. Their best result was 6th place in Zone 8/RSFSR of the Soviet Second League in 1968.

== Team name history ==
- 1968–2001 FC Metallurg Pikalyovo
- 2002–2004 FC Pikalyovo
- 2005 FC Metallurg Pikalyovo
