= FC Reformatsiya Abakan =

Russian football team

- Full name: Football Club Reformatsiya Abakan
- Founded: 1993
- Dissolved: 2000

FC Reformatsiya Abakan (Russian: «Реформация» (Абакан)) was a Russian football team from Abakan. It played professionally in the Russian Second Division in 1999 and 2000, taking 11th spot in the East Zone in 1999 and dropping out of the competition after playing 10 games in 2000.
