= FC Sever Murmansk =

- Full name: Football Club Sever Murmansk
- Founded: 1961; 65 years ago
- Ground: Central Stadium
- Capacity: 10,064
- League: North-West Football Championship
- 2023: 1st place (3)
Home colours	Away colours

FC Sever Murmansk (Russian: ФК «Север» Мурманск) is a Russian association football club from Murmansk, founded in 1961. It played professionally from 1961 to 1984 and again from 2008 until the 2013–14 season, after which it was dissolved due to financial problems. It played in the second-highest Soviet First League in 1961 and 1962. Until 1965 it was called Tralflotovets Murmansk. The club was reactivated in 2022 and currently plays in the North-West Football Championship, in the fourth tier of the Russian football league system.
