= 2005 FC Zenit Saint Petersburg season =

FC Zenit Saint Petersburg
2005 season
- Manager: Vlastimil Petržela
- Stadium: Petrovsky Stadium
- Premier League: 6th
- 2004–05 Russian Cup: Semi-finals vs CSKA Moscow
- 2005–06 Russian Cup: Progressed to 2006 season
- UEFA Cup: Progressed to 2006 season
- Top goalscorer: League: Andrey Arshavin (9); All: Andrey Arshavin (14)

The 2005 Zenit St.Petersburg season was the club's eleventh season in the Russian Premier League, the highest tier of association football in Russia.

== Squad ==
As of match played 2 December 2005

No.	Name	Nationality	Position	Date of birth (age)	Signed from	Signed in	Contract ends	Apps.	Goals
Goalkeepers
1	Kamil Čontofalský	(Slovakia)	GK	3 June 1978 (aged 27)	Bohemians 1905	2003		42	0
16	Vyacheslav Malafeev	(Russia)	GK	4 March 1979 (aged 26)	Youth Team	1999		167	0
36	Sergei Kosov	(Russia)	GK	31 January 1986 (aged 19)	Youth Team	2004		0	0
41	Mikhail Kerzhakov	(Russia)	GK	28 January 1987 (aged 18)	Youth Team	2005		0	0
Defenders
3	Martin Škrtel	(Slovakia)	DF	15 December 1984 (aged 20)	Trenčín	2004		42	1
4	Ivica Križanac	(Croatia)	DF	13 April 1979 (aged 26)	Dyskobolia Grodzisk Wielkopolski	2005		16	2
5	Milan Vještica	(Serbia and Montenegro)	DF	15 November 1979 (aged 26)	Vojvodina	2002		81	5
8	Pavel Mareš	(Czech Republic)	DF	18 January 1976 (aged 29)	Sparta Prague	2003		104	10
14	Erik Hagen	(Norway)	DF	20 July 1975 (aged 30)	Vålerenga	2005		41	0
18	Aleksandr Korotkov	(Russia)	DF	13 January 1987 (aged 18)	Youth Team	2004		0	0
22	Valeri Tsvetkov	(Russia)	DF	5 November 1977 (aged 28)	Pskov	2000			
26	Viktor Stroyev	(Russia)	DF	16 January 1987 (aged 18)	Youth Team	2004		0	0
28	Jan Flachbart	(Czech Republic)	DF	3 March 1978 (aged 27)	Jablonec	2004		51	0
32	Egidijus Majus	(Lithuania)	DF	5 January 1984 (aged 21)	Ekranas	2004		1	0
42	Alexander Grigoriev	(Russia)	DF	14 June 1986 (aged 19)	Youth Team	2005		0	0
44	Aleksandr Anyukov	(Russia)	DF	28 September 1982 (aged 23)	Krylia Sovetov	2005		21	1
Midfielders
2	Vladislav Radimov	(Russia)	MF	26 November 1975 (aged 30)	Krylia Sovetov	2003		85	10
6	Oleksandr Spivak	(Ukraine)	MF	6 January 1975 (aged 30)	Metalurh Zaporizhya	2000			
9	Radek Šírl	(Czech Republic)	MF	20 March 1981 (aged 24)	Sparta Prague	2003		53	3
10	Andrey Arshavin	(Russia)	MF	29 May 1981 (aged 24)	Youth Team	1999		189	40
17	Alan Kasaev	(Russia)	MF	8 April 1986 (aged 19)	Shinnik Yaroslavl	2005		3	0
19	Veliče Šumulikoski	(North Macedonia)	MF	24 April 1981 (aged 24)	1. Slovácko	2004		62	2
24	Aleksandr Burakov	(Russia)	MF	27 August 1987 (aged 18)	Youth Team	2004		2	0
27	Igor Denisov	(Russia)	MF	17 May 1984 (aged 21)	Youth Team	2002		81	15
33	Mikhail Kozlov	(Russia)	MF	2 November 1986 (aged 19)	Youth Team	2005		5	0
43	Oleg Vlasov	(Russia)	MF	10 December 1984 (aged 20)	Metallurg Pikalyovo	2002		48	2
55	Ilya Maksimov	(Russia)	MF	2 February 1987 (aged 18)	Youth Team	2004		1	0
88	Oleksandr Horshkov	(Ukraine)	MF	8 February 1970 (aged 35)	Saturn	2004			
Forwards
11	Aleksandr Kerzhakov	(Russia)	FW	27 November 1982 (aged 23)	Youth Team	2001		171	80
20	Oleg Kozhanov	(Russia)	FW	5 June 1987 (aged 18)	Youth Team	2004		11	1
21	Dragan Čadikovski	(North Macedonia)	FW	13 January 1982 (aged 23)	NK Celje	2005		7	1
25	Robertas Poškus	(Lithuania)	FW	5 May 1979 (aged 26)	Krylia Sovetov	2005		16	2
29	Maksim Shestakov	(Russia)	FW	10 January 1985 (aged 20)	Youth Team	2005		0	0
30	Semyon Melnikov	(Russia)	FW	27 January 1985 (aged 20)	Youth Team	2005		0	0
40	Maksim Rogov	(Russia)	FW	11 February 1986 (aged 19)	Youth Team	2005		0	0
47	Yuri Rodenkov	(Russia)	FW	20 April 1986 (aged 19)	Youth Team	2005		0	0
Away on loan
7	Oleg Trifonov	(Russia)	MF	9 June 1981 (aged 24)	Rotor Volgograd	2005		10	1
Left during the season
15	Lukáš Hartig	(Czech Republic)	FW	28 October 1976 (aged 29)	Bohemians 1905	2003		43	8
23	Aleksandr Yevstafyev	(Russia)	MF	15 January 1985 (aged 20)	Youth Team	2004		0	0
34	Vladimir Bystrov	(Russia)	MF	31 January 1984 (aged 21)	Youth Team	2001			
45	Nikolay Bugmyrin	(Russia)	FW	5 March 1987 (aged 18)	Youth Team	2004		1	0
48	Stanislav Tarasyuk	(Russia)	MF	5 January 1987 (aged 18)	Youth Team	2004		0	0
50	Sergey Mironov	(Russia)	MF	13 March 1988 (aged 17)	Youth Team	2005		0	0

== Transfers ==
=== In ===
Date	Position	Nationality	Name	From	Fee	Ref.
Winter 2005	DF	(Croatia)	Ivica Križanac	Dyskobolia Grodzisk Wielkopolski	Undisclosed	
Winter 2005	DF	(Norway)	Erik Hagen	Vålerenga	Undisclosed	
Winter 2005	MF	(Russia)	Alan Kasaev	Shinnik Yaroslavl	Undisclosed	
Winter 2005	MF	(Russia)	Oleg Trifonov	Rotor Volgograd	Undisclosed	
Winter 2005	FW	(North Macedonia)	Dragan Čadikovski	Publikum Celje	Undisclosed	
Summer 2005	DF	(Russia)	Aleksandr Anyukov	Krylia Sovetov	Undisclosed	
Summer 2005	FW	(Lithuania)	Robertas Poškus	Krylia Sovetov	Undisclosed	

=== Out ===
Date	Position	Nationality	Name	To	Fee	Ref.
Winter 2005	GK	(Russia)	Sergey Ivanov	Zenit-2 St.Petersburg	Undisclosed	
Winter 2005	DF	(Romania)	Daniel Chiriță	Metalist Kharkiv	Undisclosed	
Winter 2005	DF	(Russia)	Aleksei Katulsky	Ural Sverdlovsk	Undisclosed	
Winter 2005	DF	(Russia)	Maxim Usanov	Skonto Riga	Undisclosed	
Winter 2005	MF	(Armenia)	Armen Hovhannisyan	Pyunik	Undisclosed	
Winter 2005	MF	(Bosnia and Herzegovina)	Darko Maletić	Shinnik Yaroslavl	Undisclosed	
Winter 2005	MF	(Lithuania)	Darius Miceika	Liepājas Metalurgs	Undisclosed	
Winter 2005	MF	(Russia)	Valentin Filatov	Nosta Novotroitsk	Undisclosed	
Winter 2005	MF	(Russia)	Yaroslav Kanavchenko	Zenit-2 St.Petersburg	Undisclosed	
Winter 2005	FW	(Russia)	Dmitri Makarov	Amkar Perm	Undisclosed	
Summer 2005	MF	(Russia)	Vladimir Bystrov	Spartak Moscow	Undisclosed	
Summer 2005	MF	(Russia)	Stanislav Tarasyuk	Zenit-2 St.Petersburg	Undisclosed	
Summer 2005	FW	(Czech Republic)	Lukáš Hartig	Artmedia Petržalka	Undisclosed	
Summer 2005	FW	(Russia)	Nikolay Bugmyrin	Zenit-2 St.Petersburg	Undisclosed	

=== Loans out ===
Date from	Position	Nationality	Name	To	Date to	Ref.
Winter 2005	DF	(Czech Republic)	Martin Horák	Denizlispor	Summer 2015	
Summer 2005	DF	(Czech Republic)	Martin Horák	Rostov	End of Season	
Summer 2005	MF	(Russia)	Oleg Trifonov	Kuban Krasnodar	End of Season	

== Competitions ==
=== Overall record ===
Competition	First match	Last match	Starting round	Final position	Record							
Competition	First match	Last match	Starting round	Final position	Pld	W	D	L	GF	GA	GD	Win %
Premier League	12 March 2005	19 November 2005	Matchday 1	6th	30	12	10	8	45	26	+19	40.00
2004–05 Russian Cup	9 March 2005	25 May 2005	Round of 16	Semifinal	6	4	1	1	10	3	+7	66.67
2005–06 Russian Cup	6 July 2005	see 2006 season	Round of 32	Round of 32	2	0	2	0	1	1	+0	0.00
UEFA Cup	12 August 2004	see 2006 season	Second Qualifying Round	Group stage	8	3	4	1	9	7	+2	37.50
Total					46	19	17	10	65	37	+28	41.30

Last updated: 2 December 2005
Source: #Competitions

=== Premier League ===
==== Results by round ====
Round	1	2	3	4	5	6	7	8	9	10	11	12	13	14	15	16	17	18	19	20	21	22	23	24	25	26	27	28	29	30
Ground	H	A	H	A	H	A	H	H	A	H	H	H	A	H	A	A	H	A	H	A	H	A	A	H	A	A	A	H	A	H
Result	W	W	W	L	W	L	D	D	L	W	D	D	L	W	W	W	W	D	W	D	W	D	W	D	D	D	L	L	L	W

Updated to match(es) played on 19 November 2005. Source: See Results
A = Away; H = Home; W = Win; D = Draw; L = Loss

==== Results ====
12 March 2005 1	Zenit St.Petersburg	4 – 1	Dynamo Moscow	Saint Petersburg
16:00 MSK (UTC+4)	Križanac 38'; Arshavin (yellow card) 41' (goal) 47'; Horshkov (yellow card) 44'; Kerzhakov 50'; Šumulikoski (yellow card) 53'; Hagen (yellow card) 58'; Bystrov (yellow card) 67'; Mareš 73'	Report	Danny (yellow card) 17'; Derlei (yellow card) 49'; Frechaut 60'; Levytskyi (yellow card) 68'; Kuznetsov (yellow card) 69'	Stadium: Petrovsky Stadium; Attendance: 21,000; Referee: Alexander Evstigneev

20 March 2005 2	Alania Vladikavkaz	0 – 3	Zenit St.Petersburg	Vladikavkaz
16:00 MSK (UTC+4)	Fuzailov (yellow card) 28'; Barasa (yellow card) 55' (yellow-red card) 73'; Bazayev (yellow card) 82'; Burduli (penalty missed) 90'	Report	Vještica 13'; Spivak 27' (pen.); Kerzhakov 64'; Radimov (penalty missed) 79'; Flachbart (yellow card) 83'	Stadium: Republican Spartak Stadium; Attendance: 11,000; Referee: Vladimir Pettay

3 April 2005 3	Zenit St.Petersburg	5 – 1	Terek Grozny	Saint Petersburg
16:00 MSK (UTC+4)	Arshavin 26', 36', 62' (pen.); Radimov 51', 88'; Hagen (yellow card) 64'; Škrtel (yellow card) 73'	Report	Bokov (yellow card) 7'; Nizhegorodov (yellow card) 28'; Adamov (yellow card) 53'; Fedkov 74'	Stadium: Petrovsky Stadium; Attendance: 20,500; Referee: Mikhail Veselovsky

10 April 2005 4	Tom Tomsk	2 – 0	Zenit St.Petersburg	Tomsk
16:00 MSK (UTC+4)	Borzenkov 23'; Medvedev 90+'	Report	Arshavin (yellow card) 56'; Flachbart (yellow card) 63'	Stadium: Trud Stadium; Attendance: 14,200; Referee: Almir Kayumov

17 April 2005 5	Zenit St.Petersburg	1 – 0	CSKA Moscow	Saint Petersburg
16:00 MSK (UTC+4)	Bystrov (yellow card) 4' (goal) 54'; Radimov (yellow card) 67'; Arshavin (yellow card) 67'; Denisov (yellow card) 71'; Hagen (yellow card) 90'	Report	Gusev (yellow card) 10'; Rahimić (yellow card) 15'; Olić (yellow card) 67'	Stadium: Petrovsky Stadium; Attendance: 21,400; Referee: Alexander Evstigneev

23 April 2005 6	Krylia Sovetov	3 – 0	Zenit St.Petersburg	Samara
14:00 MSK (UTC+4)	Ovie (yellow card) 5'; Poškus (yellow card) 23'; Kolodin 82' (yellow card) 82'; Husin 90'; Mareš 90+'	Report	Arshavin (yellow card) 42'; Škrtel (yellow card) 46'	Stadium: Metallurg Stadium; Attendance: 20,000; Referee: Valentin Ivanov

30 April 2005 7	Zenit St.Petersburg	1 – 1	Lokomotiv Moscow	Saint Petersburg
14:00 MSK (UTC+4)	Hagen (yellow card) 19'; Flachbart (yellow card) 25'; Radimov (yellow card) 26' (yellow-red card) 90+'; Mareš (yellow card) 45+'; Škrtel (yellow card) 63'; Malafeev (yellow card) 71'; Hartig 81'	Report	Amelyanchuk (yellow card) 6'; Ashvetia (yellow card) 38'; Loskov 71' (pen.)	Stadium: Petrovsky Stadium; Attendance: 21,000; Referee: Igor Egorov

14 May 2005 8	Zenit St.Petersburg	1 – 1	Torpedo Moscow	Saint Petersburg
MSK (UTC+4)	Spivak (yellow card) 44'; Mareš 50' (yellow card) 71'; Kerzhakov (yellow card) 59'	Report	Stepanov (yellow card) 38'; Semshov (yellow card) 57'; Dancia (yellow card) 64'; Borodin (yellow card) 90'	Stadium: Petrovsky Stadium; Attendance: 20,000; Referee: Stanislav Sukhina

21 May 2005 9	Shinnik Yaroslavl	1 – 0	Zenit St.Petersburg	Yaroslavl
16:00 MSK (UTC+4)	Khazov (yellow card) 40'; Branco (yellow card) 55'; Vasilyev (yellow card) 59'; Spahić 68'; Bikey (yellow card) 68'	Report	Arshavin (yellow card) 45'; Hagen (yellow card) 59'	Stadium: Shinnik Stadium; Attendance: 8,000; Referee: Aleksei Nikolaev

28 May 2005 10	Zenit St.Petersburg	1 – 0	Saturn	Saint Petersburg
20:00 MSK (UTC+4)	Horshkov (yellow card) 20'; Denisov 65'; Mareš (yellow card) 76'	Report	Makarenko (yellow card) 65'; Shirokov (yellow card) 84'	Stadium: Petrovsky Stadium; Attendance: 19,000; Referee: Valentin Ivanov

11 June 2005 11	Zenit St.Petersburg	1 – 1	Spartak Moscow	Saint Petersburg
14:00 MSK (UTC+4)	Flachbart (yellow card) 45+'; Kerzhakov 85'	Report	Pogatetz (yellow card) 35'; Pavlyuchenko 59' (yellow card) 65'; Vidić (yellow card) 72'; Iencsi (yellow card) 89'	Stadium: Petrovsky Stadium; Attendance: 21,725; Referee: Alexander Evstigneev

19 June 2005 12	Zenit St.Petersburg	2 – 2	Moscow	Saint Petersburg
20:00 MSK (UTC+4)	Denisov 20'; Hagen (yellow card) 36'; Vještica (yellow card) 53'; Spivak 65' (pen.); Hartig (yellow card) 83'	Report	Ivanov (yellow card) 34'; Rebeja 41'; Gorawski 45'	Stadium: Petrovsky Stadium; Attendance: 20,500; Referee: Aleksandr Gvardis

25 June 2005 13	Rubin Kazan	1 – 0	Zenit St.Petersburg	Kazan
MSK (UTC+4)	Sillah (yellow card) 61'; Scotti 90+'	Report	Vještica (yellow card) 31'; Čadikovski (yellow card) 45'; Spivak (yellow card) 61'	Stadium: Central Stadium; Attendance: 16,500; Referee: Mikhail Veselovsky

2 July 2005 14	Zenit St.Petersburg	5 – 1	Amkar Perm	Saint Petersburg
20:00 MSK (UTC+4)	Šírl (yellow card) 8' (goal) 41'; Arshavin 16', 38', 47'; Križanac (yellow card) 18'; Flachbart (yellow card) 67'; Kozhanov 90'	Report	Lavrik (yellow card) 13'; Horshkov 31' (o.g.); Sirakov (yellow card) 51'; Popov (yellow card) 85'; Bakhtin (yellow card) 90'	Stadium: Petrovsky Stadium; Attendance: 19,700; Referee: Almir Kayumov

9 July 2005 15	Rostov	0 – 1	Zenit St.Petersburg	Rostov-on-Don
18:00 MSK (UTC+4)	Bochkov (yellow card) 21'; Pérez (yellow card) 56'; Shirshov (yellow card) 60'; Hendricks (yellow card) 84'; Osinov (yellow card) 88'; Burmistrov (yellow card) 90+'	Report	Hagen (yellow card) 8'; Križanac (yellow card) 38'; Mareš 41' (yellow card) 90+'; Arshavin (yellow card) 84'; Škrtel (yellow card) 90+'	Stadium: Olimp-2; Attendance: 11,000; Referee: Stanislav Sukhina

17 July 2005 16	Dynamo Moscow	1 – 2	Zenit St.Petersburg	Moscow
18:00 MSK (UTC+4)	Jorge Ribeiro (yellow card) 24'; Derlei (yellow card) 27'; Danny 32'; Batak (yellow card) 54'; Maniche (yellow card) 87'	Report	Spivak 23' (yellow card) 51'; Radimov (yellow card) 36'; Kerzhakov 64'	Stadium: Dynamo Stadium; Attendance: 10,000; Referee: Alexey Tyumin

23 July 2005 17	Zenit St.Petersburg	3 – 1	Alania Vladikavkaz	Saint Petersburg
20:00 MSK (UTC+4)	Križanac 27' (yellow card) 44'; Poškus 36'; Spivak 75'; Škrtel (yellow card) 83'	Report	Dadu (yellow card) 61'; Bazayev (yellow card) 80'; Tudor 87'	Stadium: Petrovsky Stadium; Attendance: 21,000; Referee: Yuri Baskakov

30 July 2005 18	Terek Grozny	0 – 0	Zenit St.Petersburg	Pyatigorsk
19:00 MSK (UTC+4)	Kingston (yellow card) 87'	Report	Škrtel (yellow card) 47'; Kozlov (yellow card) 87'	Stadium: Central Stadium; Attendance: 8,000; Referee: Mikhail Veselovsky

6 August 2005 19	Zenit St.Petersburg	1 – 0	Tom Tomsk	Saint Petersburg
20:00 MSK (UTC+4)	Spivak 34'; Flachbart (yellow card) 65'; Arshavin (yellow card) 67'; Hagen (yellow card) 74'	Report	Skrylnikov (yellow card) 33'; Yanotovsky (yellow card) 76'; Medvedev (yellow card) 77'	Stadium: Petrovsky Stadium; Attendance: 21,750; Referee: Mikhail Khodyrev

21 August 2005 20	CSKA Moscow	1 – 1	Zenit St.Petersburg	Moscow
18:00 MSK (UTC+4)	Ignashevich 61' (pen.); Odiah (yellow card) 79'	Report	Hagen (yellow card) 16'; Radimov (yellow card) 45'; Škrtel 58'	Stadium: Dynamo Stadium; Attendance: 28,000; Referee: Luis Medina Cantalejo

28 August 2005 21	Zenit St.Petersburg	4 – 1	Krylia Sovetov	Saint Petersburg
20:00 MSK (UTC+4)	Anyukov 8' (yellow card) 13'; Denisov 31' (yellow card) 50'; Spivak (yellow card) 33' (goal) 55' (pen.); Škrtel (yellow card) 69'; Šumulikoski 88'	Report	Husin (yellow card) 55'; Kowba (yellow card) 63'; Adamu 70' (pen.)	Stadium: Petrovsky Stadium; Attendance: 21,750; Referee: Aleksei Nikolaev

15 June 2005 22	Lokomotiv Moscow	0 – 0	Zenit St.Petersburg	Moscow
19:00 MSK (UTC+4)	Gurenko (yellow card) 39'; Evseev (yellow card) 81'	Report	Križanac (yellow card) 12'; Denisov (yellow card) 34'	Stadium: RZD Arena; Attendance: 16,223; Referee: Alexander Gonchar

18 September 2005 23	Torpedo Moscow	0 – 4	Zenit St.Petersburg	Moscow
17:00 MSK (UTC+4)	Spahić (yellow card) 13'; Stepanov (yellow card) 19'; Jokić (yellow card) 52'	Report	Kerzhakov 12'; Mareš (yellow card) 20'; Radimov (yellow card) 29'; Arshavin 66'; Denisov 76', 84'	Stadium: Luzhniki Stadium; Attendance: 9,000; Referee: Stanislav Sukhina

24 September 2005 24	Zenit St.Petersburg	0 – 0	Shinnik Yaroslavl	Saint Petersburg
20:00 MSK (UTC+4)	Vještica (yellow card) 27'; Arshavin (yellow card) 56'; Hagen (yellow card) 80'; Anyukov (yellow card) 87'	Report	Radosavljević (yellow card) 52'; Starostyak (yellow card) 74'; Safonov (yellow card) 76'; Chernogayev (yellow card) 77'; Shirko (yellow card) 90'	Stadium: Petrovsky Stadium; Attendance: 21,500; Referee: Mikhail Khodyrev

2 October 2005 25	Saturn	0 – 0	Zenit St.Petersburg	Ramenskoye
18:00 MSK (UTC+4)	Yesipov (yellow card) 16'	Report	Denisov (yellow card) 39'; Spivak (yellow card) 76'; Radimov (yellow card) 80'	Stadium: Saturn Stadium; Attendance: 13,500; Referee: Alexander Kolobaev

16 October 2005 26	Spartak Moscow	1 – 1	Zenit St.Petersburg	Moscow
14:00 MSK (UTC+4)	Mozart (yellow card) 24'; Bystrov (yellow card) 75'; Vidić 80' (pen.); Kováč (yellow card) 87'	Report	Škrtel (yellow card) 36'; Mareš (yellow card) 45+'; Flachbart (yellow card) 52'; Arshavin 60'; Šumulikoski (yellow card) 90+'	Stadium: Luzhniki Stadium; Attendance: 30,000; Referee: Manuel Mejuto González

23 October 2005 27	Moscow	2 – 0	Zenit St.Petersburg	Moscow
18:00 MSK (UTC+4)	Rebeja (yellow card) 14' (goal) 21'; Kirichenko 72'	Report	Anyukov (yellow card) 57'; Spivak (yellow card) 64'	Stadium: Eduard Streltsov Stadium; Attendance: 8,000; Referee: Aleksandr Gvardis

30 October 2005 28	Zenit St.Petersburg	0 – 1	Rubin Kazan	Saint Petersburg
20:00 MSK (UTC+4)	Flachbart (yellow card) 23'; Kerzhakov (yellow card) 48'; Denisov (yellow card) 54'; Hagen (yellow card) 90+'	Report	Baýramow (yellow card) 40' (goal) 56'; Kinkladze (yellow card) 45'; Vasilyev (yellow card) 60'	Stadium: Petrovsky Stadium; Attendance: 18,856; Referee: Yuri Baskakov

6 November 2005 29	Amkar Perm	1 – 0	Zenit St.Petersburg	Perm
14:00 MSK (UTC+4)	Volkov 53'; Sirakov (yellow card) 80'	Report		Stadium: Zvezda Stadium; Attendance: 16,200; Referee: Aleksei Nikolaev

19 November 2005 30	Zenit St.Petersburg	4 – 2	Rostov	Saint Petersburg
14:00 MSK (UTC+4)	Kerzhakov 4', 49' (pen.); Križanac (yellow card) 26'; Hagen (yellow card) 45'; Mareš 64'; Radimov (yellow card) 67'; Čadikovski 87'	Report	Horák 43'; Osinov 53'; Burchenko (yellow card) 70'	Stadium: Petrovsky Stadium; Attendance: 16,000; Referee: Alexander Gonchar

==== Table ====
Pos	Team	Pld	W	D	L	GF	GA	GD	Pts	Qualification or relegation
4	Rubin Kazan	30	14	9	7	45	31	+14	51	Qualification to UEFA Cup second qualifying round
5	FC Moscow	30	14	8	8	36	26	+10	50	Qualification to Intertoto Cup second round
6	Zenit St. Petersburg	30	13	10	7	45	26	+19	49	
7	Torpedo Moscow	30	12	9	9	37	33	+4	45	
8	Dynamo Moscow	20	12	2	6	36	46	−10	38	

Source: RFPL
Rules for classification: 1st points; 2nd matches won; 3rd goal difference; 4th head-to-head (points, matches won, goal difference, goals scored, away goals scored)

=== Russian Cup ===
==== 2004/05 ====
9 March 2005 Round of 16 1st leg	Zenit St.Petersburg	0 – 0	Kuban Krasnodar	Saint Petersburg
20:00 MSK (UTC+4)		Report	Topchu (yellow card) 30'; Ushenin (yellow card) 36'	Stadium: Petrovsky Stadium; Attendance: 12,600; Referee: Aleksei Nikolaev

16 March 2005 Round of 16 2nd leg	Kuban Krasnodar	0 – 1 (0 – 1 agg.)	Zenit St.Petersburg	Krasnodar
16:00 MSK (UTC+4)	Kantonistov (yellow card) 43'; Topchu (yellow card) 46' (yellow-red card) 50'; Gerasimov (yellow card) 66'	Report	Hagen (yellow card) 72'; Križanac (yellow card) 75'; Vlasov 90+'	Stadium: Kuban Stadium; Attendance: 12,000; Referee: Stanislav Sukhina

6 April 2005 Quarterfinal 1st leg	Zenit St.Petersburg	4 – 0	Shinnik Yaroslavl	Saint Petersburg
20:00 MSK (UTC+4)	Arshavin 13', 80' (yellow card) 90+'; Radimov 15' (yellow card) 41'; Horshkov 25'	Report	Korchagin (yellow card) 22'; Łągiewka (yellow card) 24'; Shtanyuk (yellow card) 38'; Pogrebnyak (yellow card) 73'	Stadium: Petrovsky Stadium; Attendance: 15,389; Referee: Mikhail Khodyrev

20 April 2005 Quarterfinal 2nd leg	Shinnik Yaroslavl	1 – 4 (1 – 8 agg.)	Zenit St.Petersburg	Yaroslavl
19:00 MSK (UTC+4)	Pogrebnyak 11'; Kornaukhov (yellow card) 11'; Morozov (yellow card) 54'; Maletić (penalty missed) 73'	Report	Hartig 8', 65'; Šumulikoski 29'; Trifonov 50'	Stadium: Shinnik Stadium; Attendance: 2,500; Referee: Yuri Baskakov

13 May 2005 Semifinal 1st leg	Zenit St.Petersburg	1 – 0	CSKA Moscow	Saint Petersburg
MSK (UTC+4)	Šírl (yellow card) 9'; Škrtel (yellow card) 62'; Hagen (yellow card) 64'; Kerzhakov 71'; Arshavin (yellow card) 82'	Report	Ignashevich (yellow card) 28'; Vágner Love (yellow card) 20' (red card) 42'; Zhirkov (yellow card) 55'; V.Berezutski (yellow card) 80'; A.Berezutski (yellow card) 88'	Stadium: Petrovsky Stadium; Attendance: 15,500; Referee: Aleksandr Gonchar

25 May 2005 Semifinal 2nd leg	CSKA Moscow	2 – 0 (2 – 1 agg.)	Zenit St.Petersburg	Moscow
19:00 MSK (UTC+4)	Aldonin 11'; Carvalho 33'; Rahimić (yellow card) 43'; Akinfeev (yellow card) 90'	Report	Horshkov (yellow card) 39'; Bystrov (yellow card) 90'	Stadium: Dynamo Stadium; Attendance: 17,000; Referee: Aleksandr Yevstigneyev

==== 2005/06 ====
6 July 2005 Round of 32 1st leg	Kuban Krasnodar	1 – 1	Zenit St.Petersburg	Krasnodar
20:00 MSK (UTC+4)	Baiano 25'; Orekhov (yellow card) 32'; Gerasimov (yellow card) 60'; Petkov (yellow card) 66'; Matiola (yellow card) 74'; Jefthon (yellow card) 75'; Oleinik (yellow card) 89'	Report	Vještica (yellow card) 30'; Radimov (yellow card) 32'; Poškus 48'	Stadium: Kuban Stadium; Attendance: 14,000; Referee: Alexander Kolobaev

13 July 2005 Round of 32 2nd leg	Zenit St.Petersburg	0 – 0 (a 1 – 1 agg.)	Kuban Krasnodar	Saint Petersburg
MSK (UTC+4)	Šumulikoski (yellow card) 53'	Report	Ushenin (yellow card) 13'	Stadium: Petrovsky Stadium; Attendance: 16,000; Referee: Valentin Ivanov

Round 16 took place during the 2006 season.

=== UEFA Cup ===
==== Qualifying rounds ====
11 August 2005 Second qualifying round 1st leg	SV Pasching (Austria)	2 – 2	(Russia) Zenit St.Petersburg	Pasching, Austria
22:45 MSK (UTC+4)	Sariyar (yellow card) 11'; M'Bock (yellow card) 19'; Chaile 33'; Pichlmann (yellow card) 80'; Wisio 87'	Report	Kerzhakov 15'; Spivak (yellow card) 34'; Škrtel (yellow card) 44'; Arshavin 73'	Stadium: Waldstadion; Referee: Pieter Vink (Netherlands)

25 August 2005 Second qualifying round 2nd leg	Zenit St.Petersburg (Russia)	1 – 1 (a 3 – 3 agg.)	(Austria) SV Pasching	Saint Petersburg, Russia
20:00 MSK (UTC+4)	Spivak 11' (pen.); Mareš (yellow card) 37'; Škrtel (yellow card) 69'	Report	Baur (yellow card) 11'; Voříšek (yellow card) 29'; Chaile (yellow card) 38'; Schoppitsch (yellow card) 47'; Gilewicz 88'; Kovačević (yellow card) 89'; Sariyar (yellow card) 90+5'	Stadium: Petrovsky Stadium; Referee: Mike Dean (England)

==== First round ====
15 September 2005 1st leg	Zenit St.Petersburg (Russia)	0 – 0	(Greece) AEK Athens	Saint Petersburg, Russia
19:00 MSK (UTC+4)	Anyukov (yellow card) 57'	Report	Katsouranis (yellow card) 12'; Alexopoulos (yellow card) 53'; Kontis (yellow card) 70'	Stadium: Petrovsky Stadium; Referee: Tommy Skjerven (Norway)

29 September 2005 2nd leg	AEK Athens (Greece)	0 – 1 (0 – 1 agg.)	(Russia) Zenit St.Petersburg	Athens, Greece
22:45 MSK (UTC+4)	Kontis (yellow card) 78'	Report	Mareš (yellow card) 82'; Arshavin 89' (yellow card) 90+3'	Stadium: Olympic Stadium; Referee: Florian Meyer (Germany)

==== Group stage ====
Pos	Team	Pld	W	D	L	GF	GA	GD	Pts	Qualification	SEV	ZEN	BOL	BJK	VIT
1	(Spain) Sevilla	4	2	1	1	8	4	+4	7	Advance to knockout stage	—	—	—	3–0	3–1
2	(Russia) Zenit Saint Petersburg	4	2	1	1	5	4	+1	7	Advance to knockout stage	2–1	—	—	—	2–1
3	(England) Bolton Wanderers	4	1	3	0	4	3	+1	6	Advance to knockout stage	1–1	1–0	—	—	—
4	(Turkey) Beşiktaş	4	1	2	1	5	6	−1	5		—	1–1	1–1	—	—
5	(Portugal) Vitória de Guimarães	4	0	1	3	4	9	−5	1		—	—	1–1	1–3	—

20 October 2005 1	Zenit St.Petersburg (Russia)	2 – 1	(Portugal) Vitória Guimarães	Saint Petersburg, Russia
20:00 MSK (UTC+4)	Spivak 39' (pen.); Arshavin 54'; Radimov (yellow card) .' (yellow-red card) 82'; Čontofalský (yellow card) 88'; Šumulikoski (yellow card) 90'	Report	Dragóner (yellow card) 20'; Medeiros (yellow card) .' (yellow-red card) 37'; Neca 59'	Stadium: Petrovsky Stadium; Attendance: 20,500; Referee: Dejan Delević (Serbia and Montenegro)

4 November 2005 2	Bolton Wanderers (England)	1 – 0	(Russia) Zenit St.Petersburg	Bolton, England
00:00 MSK (UTC+4)	Nolan 24'	Report	Hagen (yellow card) 37'; Flachbart (yellow card) 62'	Stadium: Reebok Stadium; Attendance: 15,905; Referee: Matteo Trefoloni (Italy)

24 November 2005 3	Zenit St.Petersburg (Russia)	2 – 1	(Spain) Sevilla	Saint Petersburg, Russia
21:30 MSK (UTC+4)	Kerzhakov 11', 88'; Arshavin (yellow card) 27'; Hagen (yellow card) 39'; Horshkov (yellow card) 60'; Mareš (yellow card) 84'	Report	David (yellow card) 29'; Sales (yellow card) 57'; Dani Alves (yellow card) 68'; Maresca (yellow card) 71'; Dragutinović (yellow card) 81'; Puerta (yellow card) 90+3' Saviola 90+3' (pen.)	Stadium: Petrovsky Stadium; Attendance: 20,500; Referee: Philippe Leuba (Switzerland)

2 December 2005 4	Beşiktaş (Turkey)	1 – 1	(Russia) Zenit St.Petersburg	Istanbul, Turkey
23:45 MSK (UTC+4)	Akın 23'; Dursun (yellow card) 30'; Hassan (yellow card) 90+1'	Report	Mareš (yellow card) 13'; Horshkov 29' (yellow card) 45'; Radimov (yellow card) 41'; Šumulikoski (yellow card) 90+2'	Stadium: BJK İnönü Stadium; Attendance: 20,000; Referee: Knut Kircher (Germany)

== Squad statistics ==
As of match played 2 December 2005

=== Appearances and goals ===
No.	Pos	Nat	Player	Total		Premier League		04/05 Russian Cup		05/06 Russian Cup		UEFA Cup	
No.	Pos	Nat	Player	Apps	Goals	Apps	Goals	Apps	Goals	Apps	Goals	Apps	Goals
1	GK	(Czech Republic) CZE	Kamil Čontofalský	30	0	19	0	2+1	0	0	0	8	0
2	MF	(Russia) RUS	Vladislav Radimov	36	3	24	2	4	1	1	0	7	0
3	DF	(Slovakia) SVK	Martin Škrtel	28	1	15+3	1	4	0	2	0	4	0
4	DF	(Croatia) CRO	Ivica Križanac	16	2	10+2	2	2	0	0	0	2	0
5	DF	(Serbia and Montenegro) SCG	Milan Vještica	18	1	8+4	1	1	0	2	0	3	0
6	MF	(Ukraine) UKR	Oleksandr Spivak	39	8	28	6	4	0	0	0	6+1	2
8	DF	(Czech Republic) CZE	Pavel Mareš	39	4	26	4	6	0	0	0	7	0
9	MF	(Czech Republic) CZE	Radek Šírl	22	1	10+4	1	3+1	0	0+2	0	1+1	0
10	MF	(Russia) RUS	Andrey Arshavin	41	14	29	9	4	2	0	0	8	3
11	FW	(Russia) RUS	Aleksandr Kerzhakov	38	11	25	7	5	1	0	0	8	3
14	DF	(Norway) NOR	Erik Hagen	41	0	28	0	5	0	0	0	8	0
16	GK	(Russia) RUS	Vyacheslav Malafeev	17	0	11	0	4	0	2	0	0	0
17	MF	(Russia) RUS	Alan Kasaev	3	0	0	0	0+1	0	2	0	0	0
19	MF	(North Macedonia) MKD	Veliče Šumulikoski	28	2	6+11	1	2+1	1	2	0	1+5	0
20	FW	(Russia) RUS	Oleg Kozhanov	11	1	1+8	1	0	0	1+1	0	0	0
21	FW	(North Macedonia) MKD	Dragan Čadikovski	7	1	1+3	1	1+1	0	1	0	0	0
22	DF	(Russia) RUS	Valeri Tsvetkov	5	0	2+1	0	0+1	0	1	0	0	0
25	FW	(Lithuania) LTU	Robertas Poškus	16	2	7+4	1	0	0	1	1	0+4	0
27	MF	(Russia) RUS	Igor Denisov	32	5	14+6	5	1+4	0	0	0	3+4	0
28	DF	(Czech Republic) CZE	Jan Flachbart	37	0	21+1	0	6	0	2	0	6+1	0
33	MF	(Russia) RUS	Mikhail Kozlov	5	0	0+3	0	0	0	0+1	0	0+1	0
40	FW	(Russia) RUS	Maksim Rogov	1	0	0	0	0	0	1	0	0	0
43	MF	(Russia) RUS	Oleg Vlasov	24	1	1+12	0	0+3	1	2	0	1+5	0
44	DF	(Russia) RUS	Aleksandr Anyukov	21	1	12	1	0	0	1	0	8	0
55	MF	(Russia) RUS	Ilya Maksimov	1	0	0	0	0	0	0+1	0	0	0
88	MF	(Ukraine) UKR	Oleksandr Horshkov	42	2	22+6	0	5	1	0+1	0	7+1	1
Players who away on loan:
7	MF	(Russia) RUS	Oleg Trifonov	10	1	2+5	0	2	1	1	0	0	0
Players who left Zenit during the season:
15	FW	(Czech Republic) CZE	Lukáš Hartig	9	3	0+6	1	2+1	2	0	0	0	0
34	MF	(Russia) RUS	Vladimir Bystrov	18	1	8+5	1	3+2	0	0	0	0	0

=== Goal Scorers ===
Place	Position	Nation	Number	Name	Premier League	04/05 Russian Cup	05/06 Russian Cup	UEFA Cup	Total
1	MF	(Russia)	10	Andrey Arshavin	9	2	0	3	14
2	FW	(Russia)	11	Aleksandr Kerzhakov	7	1	0	3	11
3	MF	(Ukraine)	6	Oleksandr Spivak	6	0	0	2	8
4	MF	(Russia)	27	Igor Denisov	5	0	0	0	5
5	DF	(Czech Republic)	8	Pavel Mareš	4	0	0	0	4
6	MF	(Russia)	2	Vladislav Radimov	2	1	0	0	3
6	FW	(Czech Republic)	15	Lukáš Hartig	1	2	0	0	3
8	DF	(Croatia)	4	Ivica Križanac	2	0	0	0	2
8	MF	(North Macedonia)	19	Veliče Šumulikoski	1	1	0	0	2
8	MF	(Ukraine)	88	Oleksandr Horshkov	0	1	0	1	2
11	DF	(Serbia and Montenegro)	5	Milan Vještica	1	0	0	0	1
11	MF	(Russia)	34	Vladimir Bystrov	1	0	0	0	1
11	MF	(Czech Republic)	9	Radek Šírl	1	0	0	0	1
11	FW	(Russia)	20	Oleg Kozhanov	1	0	0	0	1
11	FW	(Lithuania)	25	Robertas Poškus	1	0	1	0	1
11	DF	(Slovakia)	3	Martin Škrtel	1	0	0	0	1
11	MF	(Russia)	44	Aleksandr Anyukov	1	0	0	0	1
11	FW	(North Macedonia)	21	Dragan Čadikovski	1	0	0	0	1
11	MF	(Russia)	43	Oleg Vlasov	0	1	0	0	1
11	MF	(Russia)	7	Oleg Trifonov	0	1	0	0	1
				TOTALS	45	10	1	9	65

=== Clean sheets ===
Place	Position	Nation	Number	Name	Premier League	04/05 Russian Cup	05/06 Russian Cup	UEFA Cup	Total
1	GK	(Czech Republic)	1	Kamil Čontofalský	8	1	0	2	11
2	GK	(Russia)	16	Vyacheslav Malafeev	2	3	1	0	6
				TOTALS	10	4	1	2	17

=== Disciplinary record ===
Number	Nation	Position	Name	Premier League		04/05 Russian Cup		05/06 Russian Cup		UEFA Cup		Total	
Number	Nation	Position	Name	Booked	Sent off (straight red)	Booked	Sent off (straight red)	Booked	Sent off (straight red)	Booked	Sent off (straight red)	Booked	Sent off (straight red)
1	(Czech Republic)	GK	Kamil Čontofalský	0	0	0	0	0	0	1	0	1	0
2	(Russia)	MF	Vladislav Radimov	8	1	1	0	1	0	3	1	13	2
3	(Czech Republic)	DF	Martin Škrtel	8	0	1	0	0	0	2	0	11	0
4	(Croatia)	DF	Ivica Križanac	5	0	1	0	0	0	0	0	6	0
5	(Serbia and Montenegro)	DF	Milan Vještica	3	0	0	0	1	0	0	0	4	0
6	(Ukraine)	MF	Oleksandr Spivak	6	0	0	0	0	0	1	0	7	0
8	(Czech Republic)	DF	Pavel Mareš	6	0	0	0	0	0	4	0	10	0
9	(Czech Republic)	MF	Radek Šírl	1	0	1	0	0	0	0	0	2	0
10	(Russia)	MF	Andrey Arshavin	8	0	2	0	0	0	2	0	12	0
11	(Russia)	FW	Aleksandr Kerzhakov	2	0	0	0	0	0	0	0	2	0
14	(Norway)	DF	Erik Hagen	12	0	2	0	0	0	2	0	16	0
16	(Russia)	GK	Vyacheslav Malafeev	1	0	0	0	0	0	0	0	1	0
19	(North Macedonia)	MF	Veliče Šumulikoski	2	0	0	0	1	0	2	0	5	0
21	(North Macedonia)	FW	Dragan Čadikovski	1	0	0	0	0	0	0	0	1	0
27	(Russia)	MF	Igor Denisov	5	0	0	0	0	0	0	0	5	0
28	(Czech Republic)	DF	Jan Flachbart	8	0	0	0	0	0	1	0	9	0
33	(Russia)	MF	Mikhail Kozlov	1	0	0	0	0	0	0	0	1	0
44	(Russia)	DF	Aleksandr Anyukov	3	0	0	0	0	0	1	0	4	0
88	(Ukraine)	MF	Oleksandr Horshkov	2	0	1	0	0	0	2	0	5	0
Players away on loan:
Players who left Zenit St.Petersburg during the season:
15	(Czech Republic)	FW	Lukáš Hartig	1	0	0	0	0	0	0	0	1	0
34	(Russia)	MF	Vladimir Bystrov	2	0	1	0	0	0	0	0	3	0
			TOTALS	85	1	10	0	3	0	21	1	119	2
