= 2004 FC Zenit Saint Petersburg season =

FC Zenit Saint Petersburg
2004 season
- Manager: Vlastimil Petržela
- Stadium: Petrovsky Stadium
- Premier League: 4th
- 2003–04 Russian Cup: Round of 16 vs Krylia Sovetov
- 2004–05 Russian Cup: Progressed to 2005 season
- UEFA Cup: Group stage
- Top goalscorer: League: Aleksandr Kerzhakov (18); All: Aleksandr Kerzhakov (29)

The 2004 Zenit St.Petersburg season was the club's tenth season in the Russian Premier League, the highest tier of association football in Russia.

== Squad ==
As of match played 2 December 2004

No.	Name	Nationality	Position	Date of birth (age)	Signed from	Signed in	Contract ends	Apps.	Goals
Goalkeepers
1	Kamil Čontofalský	(Slovakia)	GK	3 June 1978 (aged 26)	Bohemians 1905	2003		12	0
16	Vyacheslav Malafeev	(Russia)	GK	4 March 1979 (aged 25)	Youth Team	1999		150	0
31	Sergey Ivanov	(Russia)	GK	16 June 1984 (aged 20)	Youth Team	2001			
51	Sergei Kosov	(Russia)	GK	31 January 1986 (aged 18)	Youth Team	2004		0	0
Defenders
3	Martin Škrtel	(Slovakia)	DF	15 December 1984 (aged 19)	Trenčín	2004		14	0
4	Martin Horák	(Czech Republic)	DF	16 September 1980 (aged 24)	Sparta Prague	2003		52	3
5	Milan Vještica	(Serbia and Montenegro)	DF	15 November 1979 (aged 25)	Vojvodina	2002		63	4
8	Pavel Mareš	(Czech Republic)	DF	18 January 1976 (aged 28)	Sparta Prague	2003		65	6
18	Aleksandr Korotkov	(Russia)	DF	13 January 1987 (aged 17)	Youth Team	2004		0	0
20	Aleksei Katulsky	(Russia)	DF	18 January 1976 (aged 28)	Youth Team	1996			
21	Nikolai Yefimov	(Russia)	DF	21 March 1984 (aged 20)	Youth Team	2002		0	0
22	Valeri Tsvetkov	(Russia)	DF	5 November 1977 (aged 27)	Pskov	2000			
25	Daniel Chiriță	(Romania)	DF	24 March 1974 (aged 30)	Shakhtar Donetsk	2002		60	2
28	Jan Flachbart	(Czech Republic)	DF	3 March 1978 (aged 26)	Jablonec	2004		14	0
32	Egidijus Majus	(Lithuania)	DF	5 January 1984 (aged 20)	Ekranas	2004		1	0
33	Maxim Usanov	(Russia)	DF	5 March 1985 (aged 19)	Youth Team	2003		0	0
35	Viktor Stroyev	(Russia)	DF	16 January 1987 (aged 17)	Youth Team	2004		0	0
Midfielders
2	Vladislav Radimov	(Russia)	MF	26 November 1975 (aged 29)	Krylia Sovetov	2003		49	7
6	Oleksandr Spivak	(Ukraine)	MF	6 January 1975 (aged 29)	Metalurh Zaporizhya	2000			
9	Radek Šírl	(Czech Republic)	MF	20 March 1981 (aged 23)	Sparta Prague	2003		31	2
10	Andrey Arshavin	(Russia)	MF	29 May 1981 (aged 23)	Youth Team	1999		148	26
14	Valentin Filatov	(Russia)	MF	19 March 1982 (aged 22)	Youth Team	2001			
17	Darko Maletić	(Bosnia and Herzegovina)	MF	20 October 1980 (aged 24)	NK Celje	2004		2	0
19	Veliče Šumulikoski	(North Macedonia)	MF	24 April 1981 (aged 23)	1. Slovácko	2004		34	0
23	Yaroslav Kanavchenko	(Russia)	MF	21 April 1985 (aged 19)	Youth Team	2002		0	0
24	Aleksandr Burakov	(Russia)	MF	27 August 1987 (aged 17)	Youth Team	2004		2	0
26	Darius Miceika	(Lithuania)	MF	22 February 1983 (aged 21)	Žalgiris	2002		13	2
27	Igor Denisov	(Russia)	MF	17 May 1984 (aged 20)	Youth Team	2002		49	10
34	Vladimir Bystrov	(Russia)	MF	31 January 1984 (aged 20)	Youth Team	2001			
38	Armen Hovhannisyan	(Armenia)	MF	24 January 1986 (aged 18)	Pyunik	2004		0	0
43	Oleg Vlasov	(Russia)	MF	10 December 1984 (aged 19)	Metallurg Pikalyovo	2002		24	1
48	Stanislav Tarasyuk	(Russia)	MF	5 January 1987 (aged 17)	Youth Team	2004		0	0
55	Ilya Maksimov	(Russia)	MF	2 February 1987 (aged 17)	Youth Team	2004		0	0
88	Oleksandr Horshkov	(Ukraine)	MF	8 February 1970 (aged 34)	Saturn	2004			
Forwards
7	Dmitri Makarov	(Russia)	FW	16 September 1982 (aged 22)	Youth Team	2000			
11	Aleksandr Kerzhakov	(Russia)	FW	27 November 1982 (aged 22)	Youth Team	2001		133	69
15	Lukáš Hartig	(Czech Republic)	FW	28 October 1976 (aged 28)	Bohemians 1905	2003		34	5
45	Nikolay Bugmyrin	(Russia)	FW	5 March 1987 (aged 17)	Youth Team	2004		1	0
50	Oleg Kozhanov	(Russia)	FW	5 June 1987 (aged 17)	Youth Team	2004		0	0
Away on loan
Left during the season
28	Marek Kincl	(Czech Republic)	FW	3 April 1973 (aged 31)	Sparta Prague	2004		7	0
32	Konstantin Lobov	(Russia)	DF	2 May 1981 (aged 23)	Youth Team	1998			
77	Konstantin Konoplyov	(Russia)	MF	13 May 1980 (aged 24)	Youth Team	1998			
99	Maksim Astafyev	(Russia)	FW	8 December 1982 (aged 21)	Youth Team	2000			

== Transfers ==
=== In ===
Date	Position	Nationality	Name	From	Fee	Ref.
Winter 2004	MF	(Armenia)	Armen Hovhannisyan	Pyunik		
Winter 2004	MF	(Bosnia and Herzegovina)	Darko Maletić	Publikum Celje		
Winter 2004	MF	(North Macedonia)	Veliče Šumulikoski	1. Slovácko		
Winter 2004	MF	(Ukraine)	Oleksandr Horshkov	Saturn		
Winter 2004	FW	(Czech Republic)	Marek Kincl	Sparta Prague		
Summer 2004	DF	(Czech Republic)	Jan Flachbart	Jablonec 97		
Summer 2004	DF	(Slovakia)	Martin Škrtel	AS Trenčín		
Summer 2004	DF	(Lithuania)	Egidijus Majus	Ekranas		

=== Out ===
Date	Position	Nationality	Name	To	Fee	Ref.
Winter 2004	GK	(Russia)	Sergei Losev	Tom Tomsk		
Winter 2004	DF	(Russia)	Aleksei Igonin	Chornomorets Odesa		
Winter 2004	DF	(Russia)	Ivan Lozenkov	Zenit-2 St.Petersburg		
Winter 2004	DF	(Russia)	Igor Nedorezov	Luch-Energiya Vladivostok		
Winter 2004	MF	(Russia)	Yevgeny Levandovsky	Zenit-2 St.Petersburg		
Winter 2004	MF	(Russia)	Viktor Lopatyonok	Zenit-2 St.Petersburg		
Winter 2004	MF	(Russia)	Stanislav Miloserdov	Zenit-2 St.Petersburg		
Winter 2004	MF	(Russia)	Maksim Mosin	Metallurg Lipetsk		
Winter 2004	MF	(Russia)	Sergei Vasyanovich	Metallurg Lipetsk		
Winter 2004	FW	(Russia)	Andrei Nikolayev	Moscow		
Summer 2004	DF	(Russia)	Konstantin Lobov	Luch-Energiya Vladivostok		
Summer 2004	MF	(Russia)	Konstantin Konoplyov	Torpedo Moscow		
Summer 2004	FW	(Czech Republic)	Marek Kincl	Rapid Wien		
Summer 2004	FW	(Russia)	Maksim Astafyev	Luch-Energiya Vladivostok		

== Competitions ==
=== Overall record ===
Competition	First match	Last match	Starting round	Final position	Record							
Competition	First match	Last match	Starting round	Final position	Pld	W	D	L	GF	GA	GD	Win %
Premier League	13 March 2004	11 November 2004	Matchday 1	4th	30	17	5	8	55	37	+18	56.67
2003–04 Russian Cup	6 March 2004	6 March 2004	Round of 16	Round of 16	1	0	1	0	1	1	+0	0.00
2004–05 Russian Cup	31 July 2004	see 2005 season	Round of 32	Round of 32	2	2	0	0	9	1	+8	100.00
UEFA Cup	12 August 2004	2 December 2004	Second Qualifying Round	Group stage	8	4	2	2	18	10	+8	50.00
Total					41	23	8	10	83	49	+34	56.10

Last updated: 2 December 2004
Source: #Competitions

=== Premier League ===
==== Results by round ====
Round	1	2	3	4	5	6	7	8	9	10	11	12	13	14	15	16	17	18	19	20	21	22	23	24	25	26	27	28	29	30
Ground	H	A	H	A	H	A	H	A	A	H	H	A	H	A	H	A	H	A	H	H	A	A	H	A	H	A	H	A	H	A
Result	W	D	D	D	W	W	W	L	W	W	L	W	W	L	W	W	L	W	L	W	W	W	W	L	D	D	L	W	L	W

Updated to match(es) played on 11 November 2004. Source: See Results
A = Away; H = Home; W = Win; D = Draw; L = Loss

==== Results ====
13 March 2004 1	Zenit St.Petersburg	3 – 2	Rotor Volgograd	Saint Petersburg
16:00 MSK (UTC+3)	Horák (yellow card) 44'; Bystrov 47'; Arshavin (yellow card) 57'; Mareš 58'; Kerzhakov 62'; Radimov (yellow card) 73'	Report	Yesipov 13', 31'; Mogilevskiy (yellow card) 45'; Krivov (yellow card) 63'; Trifonov (yellow card) 80'	Stadium: Petrovsky Stadium; Attendance: 21,900; Referee: Valentin Ivanov

21 March 2004 2	Moscow	1 – 1	Zenit St.Petersburg	Moscow
16:00 MSK (UTC+3)	Yaskovich (yellow card) 11'; Tchuissé (yellow card) 43'; Shustikov (yellow card) 57'; Budunov 68' (yellow card) 71'	Report	Kerzhakov 25'	Stadium: Eduard Streltsov Stadium; Attendance: 4,000; Referee: Alexey Tyumin

27 March 2004 3	Zenit St.Petersburg	2 – 2	Saturn	Saint Petersburg
16:00 MSK (UTC+3)	Mareš 22'; Spivak (yellow card) 26'; Arshavin 32'; Horshkov (yellow card) 40'; Denisov (yellow card) 76'; Vještica (yellow card) 90'	Report	Géder (yellow card) 27'; P.Bystrov 61'; Guiñazú (yellow card) 71'; Pusineri 84' (yellow card) 90+'; Delgado (yellow card) 84'	Stadium: Petrovsky Stadium; Attendance: 21,900; Referee: Alexander Kolobaev

3 April 2004 4	CSKA Moscow	3 – 3	Zenit St.Petersburg	Moscow
16:00 MSK (UTC+4)	Kirichenko 6' (yellow card) 20'; Zhirkov 39'; Rahimić 56'; Mandrykin (yellow card) 59'; Shershun (yellow card) 67' (yellow-red card) 71'; V.Berezutski (yellow card) 83'	Report	Radimov 41' (yellow card) 45'; Kerzhakov 64'; Spivak 90'	Stadium: Dynamo Stadium; Attendance: 11,000; Referee: Vladimir Vlasov

7 April 2004 5	Zenit St.Petersburg	4 – 3	Rubin Kazan	Saint Petersburg
19:00 MSK (UTC+4)	Spivak 21' (pen.); Šírl 38'; Radimov 42'; Vještica (red card) 73'; Kerzhakov 85'; Horshkov (yellow card) 88'	Report	Rôni 22'; Fyodorov 48'; Boyarintsev 68'; Sillah (red card) 73'; Petrouš (yellow card) 78'; Novotný (yellow card) 90'	Stadium: Petrovsky Stadium; Attendance: 21,500; Referee: Yuri Baskakov

11 April 2004 6	Amkar Perm	0 – 2	Zenit St.Petersburg	Perm
17:00 MSK (UTC+4)	Popov (yellow card) 25'; Sirakov (yellow card) 57'	Report	Arshavin 21' (yellow card) 36'; Spivak 81' (pen.)	Stadium: Zvezda Stadium; Attendance: 19,500; Referee: Sergey Timofeev

18 April 2004 7	Zenit St.Petersburg	1 – 0	Shinnik Yaroslavl	Saint Petersburg
18:00 MSK (UTC+4)	Arshavin 42'	Report	Ilson (yellow card) 17'	Stadium: Petrovsky Stadium; Attendance: 21,655; Referee: Valery Shaveyko

25 April 2004 8	Torpedo Moscow	3 – 1	Zenit St.Petersburg	Moscow
17:00 MSK (UTC+4)	Samusiovas (yellow card) 28'; Budylin 54' (pen.); Panov 69', 78'	Report	Kerzhakov 33'; Mareš (yellow card) 44'	Stadium: Luzhniki Stadium; Attendance: 9,000; Referee: Stanislav Sukhina

1 May 2004 9	Spartak Moscow	0 – 3	Zenit St.Petersburg	Moscow
16:00 MSK (UTC+4)	Petković (yellow card) 39' (penalty missed) 85'; Iencsi (yellow card) 48'; Samedov (yellow card) 83'	Report	Kerzhakov 37'; Horshkov (yellow card) 43'; Spivak 49'; Šírl (yellow card) 55'; Arshavin 60' (yellow card) 83'	Stadium: Luzhniki Stadium; Attendance: 16,152; Referee: Sergey Timofeev

8 May 2004 10	Zenit St.Petersburg	2 – 0	Dynamo Moscow	Saint Petersburg
16:00 MSK (UTC+4)	Kerzhakov 33'; Horshkov 42'; Konoplyov (yellow card) 90'	Report	Mikhaylov (yellow card) 58'; Tanasijević (yellow card) 76'	Stadium: Petrovsky Stadium; Attendance: 21,500; Referee: Aleksandr Gvardis

16 May 2004 11	Zenit St.Petersburg	1 – 2	Krylia Sovetov	Saint Petersburg
18:00 MSK (UTC+4)	Mareš 35'; Šírl (yellow card) 50'; Radimov (yellow card) 52'; Horák (yellow card) 90'	Report	Schmitz (yellow card) 33'; Karyaka (yellow card) 40' (goal) 85'; Poškus 50'	Stadium: Petrovsky Stadium; Attendance: 21,500; Referee: Sergei Frantsuzov

19 May 2004 12	Lokomotiv Moscow	0 – 1	Zenit St.Petersburg	Moscow
19:00 MSK (UTC+4)	Maminov (yellow card) 10'; Evseev (yellow card) 30'; Gurenko (yellow card) 40'; Pashinin (yellow card) 42'	Report	Mareš (yellow card) 30'; Malafeev (yellow card) 53'; Horshkov (yellow card) 73'; Kerzhakov 89'	Stadium: RZD Arena; Attendance: 18,623; Referee: Stanislav Sukhina

22 May 2004 13	Zenit St.Petersburg	1 – 0	Kuban Krasnodar	Saint Petersburg
18:00 MSK (UTC+4)	Kerzhakov 40'	Report	Landyrev (yellow card) 16'; Topchu (yellow card) 22'; Ushenin (yellow card) 60'; Dyomin (yellow card) 65'	Stadium: Petrovsky Stadium; Attendance: 21,500; Referee: Almir Kayumov

3 July 2004 14	Rostov	2 – 1	Zenit St.Petersburg	Rostov-on-Don
18:00 MSK (UTC+4)	Shirshov (yellow card) 64'; Alkhazov 83'; Pérez 89'	Report	Horshkov 45'; Denisov (yellow card) 56'; Bystrov (yellow card) 64'	Stadium: Olimp-2; Attendance: 9,000; Referee: Mikhail Khodyrev

7 July 2004 15	Zenit St.Petersburg	3 – 2	Alania Vladikavkaz	Saint Petersburg
20:00 MSK (UTC+4)	Spivak 3' (pen.) (yellow card) 13'; Horák 42'; Šumulikoski (yellow card) 79'; Hartig 90'	Report	Bazayev 14' (pen.), 44' (yellow card) 14'; Smirnov (yellow card) 47'; Al.Kusov (yellow card) 88'	Stadium: Petrovsky Stadium; Attendance: 20,500; Referee: Igor Zakharov

10 July 2004 16	Kuban Krasnodar	1 – 3	Zenit St.Petersburg	Krasnodar
19:00 MSK (UTC+4)	Dyomin (yellow card) 42'; Vuka 55'; Jefthon (yellow card) 59'; Orekhov (yellow card) 62'	Report	Arshavin 43'; Denisov 52'; Malafeev (yellow card) 56'; Spivak 66' (pen.)	Stadium: Kuban Stadium; Attendance: 16,000; Referee: Yuri Baskakov

17 July 2004 17	Zenit St.Petersburg	0 – 2	Lokomotiv Moscow	Saint Petersburg
19:30 MSK (UTC+4)	Chiriță (yellow card) 28'	Report	Sychev 16'; Nizhegorodov (yellow card) 77' (yellow-red card) 88'; Pimenov 90+'	Stadium: Petrovsky Stadium; Attendance: 21,650; Referee: Aleksandr Gvardis

25 Jul 2004 18	Alania Vladikavkaz	0 – 3	Zenit St.Petersburg	Vladikavkaz
17:00 MSK (UTC+4)	Drozdov (yellow card) 23'; Brabec (yellow card) 43'; Al.Kusov (yellow card) 71'	Report	Horák (yellow card) 19'; Spivak 44' (pen.); Radimov (yellow card) 52'; Hartig (yellow card) 60'; Kerzhakov 75', 88'	Stadium: Republican Spartak Stadium; Attendance: 6,000; Referee: Valentin Ivanov

15 August 2004 19	Zenit St.Petersburg	0 – 1	Rostov	Saint Petersburg
19:30 MSK (UTC+4)	Šumulikoski (yellow card) 55'	Report	Mnguni (yellow card) 44'; Kanyenda (yellow card) 45'; Mareš 56' (o.g.); Booth (yellow card) 75'; Blyznyuk (yellow card) 76'	Stadium: Petrovsky Stadium; Attendance: 21,000; Referee: Almir Kayumov

21 August 2004 20	Zenit St.Petersburg	2 – 0	Spartak Moscow	Saint Petersburg
16:00 MSK (UTC+4)	Spivak 12' (pen.) (yellow card) 78'; Radimov 22' (yellow card) 24'; Vještica (yellow card) 83'; Arshavin (yellow card) 84'	Report	Kovtun (yellow card) 12'; Alenichev (yellow card) 35'; Pavlyuchenko (yellow card) 42'; Jiránek (yellow card) 45'; Vidić (yellow card) 56'; Pavlenko (yellow card) 61'	Stadium: Petrovsky Stadium; Attendance: 21,500; Referee: Vladimir Pettay

29 August 2004 21	Dynamo Moscow	0 – 2	Zenit St.Petersburg	Moscow
MSK (UTC+4)	Beschastnykh (yellow card) 2'; Khizaneishvili (yellow card) 41'; Bratić (yellow card) 59'	Report	Kerzhakov 2', 20'; Mareš (yellow card) 66'; Chiriță (yellow card) 69' (yellow-red card) 78'; Hartig (yellow card) 86' (yellow-red card) 90+'	Stadium: Dynamo Stadium; Attendance: 5,000; Referee: Vladimir Vlasov

11 September 2004 22	Krylia Sovetov	0 – 1	Zenit St.Petersburg	Samara
16:00 MSK (UTC+4)	Karyaka (penalty missed) 27'; Koroman (yellow card) 40'; Moisés (yellow card) 53' (yellow-red card) 79'	Report	Radimov (yellow card) 27'; Mareš (yellow card) 53'; Horshkov (yellow card) 57'; Kerzhakov 63'; Šumulikoski (yellow card) 77'	Stadium: Metallurg Stadium; Attendance: 35,000; Referee: Yuri Baskakov

20 September 2004 23	Zenit St.Petersburg	3 – 1	Torpedo Moscow	Saint Petersburg
20:00 MSK (UTC+4)	Kerzhakov 72', 78'; Hartig 80'	Report	Panov 24'; Kormiltsev (yellow card) 27'; Samusiovas (yellow card) 36'; Lebedenko (yellow card) 85'; Bugayev (yellow card) 89'	Stadium: Petrovsky Stadium; Attendance: 21,000; Referee: Stanislav Sukhina

25 September 2004 24	Shinnik Yaroslavl	2 – 1	Zenit St.Petersburg	Yaroslavl
18:00 MSK (UTC+4)	Kulchy (yellow card) 7'; Spahić 24', 50' (pen.); Shevchuk (yellow card) 86'	Report	Spivak 25'; Arshavin (yellow card) 71'; Škrtel (yellow card) 78'	Stadium: Shinnik Stadium; Attendance: 19,500; Referee: Mikhail Veselovsky

3 October 2004 25	Zenit St.Petersburg	0 – 0	Amkar Perm	Saint Petersburg
20:00 MSK (UTC+4)	Flachbart (yellow card) 14'; Spivak (yellow card) 77'; Škrtel (yellow card) 82'	Report		Stadium: Petrovsky Stadium; Attendance: 21,500; Referee: Alexander Evstigneev

16 October 2004 26	Rubin Kazan	1 – 1	Zenit St.Petersburg	Kazan
16:00 MSK (UTC+4)	Konovalov (yellow card) 12'; Sibaya (yellow card) 26'; Domínguez 34' (pen.); Aloísio (yellow card) 78'	Report	Denisov 37'; Horák (yellow card) 85'; Horshkov (yellow card) 87'; Vlasov (yellow card) 90+'	Stadium: Central Stadium; Attendance: 8,300; Referee: Alexander Kolobaev

25 October 2004 27	Zenit St.Petersburg	0 – 3	CSKA Moscow	Saint Petersburg
20:00 MSK (UTC+4)	Mareš (yellow card) 35'; Šumulikoski (yellow card) 52'; Radimov (yellow card) 69'	Report	Gusev 13'; Šemberas (yellow card) 44'; Zhirkov 70' (yellow card) 76'; Vágner Love 90' (yellow card) 90'	Stadium: Petrovsky Stadium; Attendance: 22,000; Referee: Vladimir Pettay

31 October 2004 28	Saturn	1 – 3	Zenit St.Petersburg	Ramenskoye
16:00 MSK (UTC+3)	Delgado (yellow card) 48'; Jean (yellow card) 55'; Rogaciov 70'	Report	Škrtel (yellow card) 6'; Vlasov 20'; Bystrov (red card) 44'; Denisov 54'; Kerzhakov 68' (pen.); Mareš (yellow card) 77'	Stadium: Saturn Stadium; Attendance: 12,000; Referee: Almir Kayumov

7 November 2004 29	Zenit St.Petersburg	2 – 3	Moscow	Saint Petersburg
MSK (UTC+3)	Šumulikoski (yellow card) 18'; Denisov 42'; Arshavin (yellow card) 48'; Horshkov (yellow card) 64'; Šírl (yellow card) 89'; Hartig 90+'	Report	Biletskyi 22'; Adamu (yellow card) 55'; Melyoshin 64'; Budunov 84'; Karić (yellow card) 90+'	Stadium: Petrovsky Stadium; Attendance: 21,500; Referee: Igor Egorov

11 November 2004 30	Rotor Volgograd	2 – 5	Zenit St.Petersburg	Volgograd
MSK (UTC+3)	Yepifanov (yellow card) 13'; Gogniyev 39'; Trifonov (yellow card) 68'; Krivov 85'	Report	Kerzhakov 10' (penalty missed) 73'; Bystrov (yellow card) 26'; Arshavin 40' (yellow card) 48'; Spivak 46'; Denisov 59', 88'; Flachbart (yellow card) 64'	Stadium: Central Stadium; Attendance: 10,000; Referee: Yuri Baskakov

==== Table ====
Pos	Team	Pld	W	D	L	GF	GA	GD	Pts	Qualification or relegation
2	CSKA Moscow	30	17	9	4	53	22	+31	60	Qualification to UEFA Cup first round
3	Krylia Sovetov Samara	30	17	5	8	50	41	+9	56	Qualification to UEFA Cup second qualifying round
4	Zenit St. Petersburg	30	17	5	8	55	37	+18	56	Qualification to UEFA Cup second qualifying round
5	Torpedo Moscow	30	16	6	8	53	37	+16	54	
6	Shinnik Yaroslavl	30	12	8	10	29	29	0	44	

Source: RSSSF
Rules for classification: 1st points; 2nd matches won; 3rd head-to-head (points, matches won, goal difference, goals scored, away goals scored); 4th goal difference

=== Russian Cup ===
==== 2003/04 ====
6 March 2004 Round of 16 1st leg	Zenit St.Petersburg	1 – 1 (1 – 1 a agg.)	Krylia Sovetov	Saint Petersburg
16:00 MSK (UTC+4)	Bystrov (yellow card) 36'; Spivak 60'; Chiriță (yellow card) 63'; Kerzhakov (yellow card) 90'	Report	Kowba (yellow card) 35'; Catanha (yellow card) 60'; Anyukov (yellow card) 82'; Koroman 87' (yellow card) 90'	Stadium: Petrovsky Stadium; Attendance: 17,000

==== 2004/05 ====
31 July 2004 Round of 32 1st leg	Irtysh Omsk	0 – 2	Zenit St.Petersburg	Omsk
18:30 MSK (UTC+4)	Lebedev (yellow card) 76'; A.Bliznyuk (yellow card) 89'	Report	Horák (yellow card) 52'; Hartig 57' (yellow card) 61'; Konoplyov (yellow card) 58'; Maletić (yellow card) 72'; Makarov 78'; Šumulikoski (yellow card) 82'	Stadium: Red Star Stadium; Attendance: 5,523; Referee: Sergei Matsyura

10 August 2004 Round of 32 2nd leg	Zenit St.Petersburg	7 – 1 (9 – 1 agg.)	Irtysh Omsk	Saint Petersburg
MSK (UTC+4)	Makarov 3', 42'; Kerzhakov 4', 35', 40', 51', 84'; Vještica (yellow card) 56'	Report	Zvagolskiy (yellow card) 5' (yellow-red card) 60'; Bagayev 25'; Lebedev (yellow card) 57'	Stadium: Petrovsky Stadium; Attendance: 8,000; Referee: Sergei Marushko

Round 16 took place during the 2005 season.

=== UEFA Cup ===
==== Qualifying rounds ====
12 August 2004 Second qualifying round 1st leg	ASKÖ Pasching (Austria)	3 – 1	(Russia) Zenit St.Petersburg	Pasching, Austria
MSK (UTC+4)	Wisio (yellow card) 13'; Glieder 16' (pen.85); Mayrleb 35'; Ježek (yellow card) 43'; M.Horvath (yellow card) 88'	Report	Kafkas 10' (o.g.); Šumulikoski (yellow card) 53'	Stadium: Waldstadion; Referee: Bülent Uzun (Turkey)

26 August 2004 Second qualifying round 2nd leg	Zenit St.Petersburg (Russia)	2 – 0 (a 3 – 3 agg.)	(Austria) ASKÖ Pasching	Saint Petersburg, Russia
21:30 MSK (UTC+4)	Vještica 10' (yellow card) 43'; Kerzhakov 18' (yellow card) 90+4'; Arshavin (yellow card) 65'	Report	M.Horvath (yellow card) 61'; Sariyar (yellow card) 69'; T.Knabel (yellow card) 78'; Wisio (yellow card) 90+2'	Stadium: Petrovsky Stadium; Referee: Stéphane Bré (French)

==== First round ====
16 September 2004 1st leg	Zenit St.Petersburg (Russia)	4 – 0	(Serbia and Montenegro) Red Star Belgrade	Saint Petersburg, Russia
22:30 MSK (UTC+4)	Arshavin 26', 44'; Horshkov 32'; Kerzhakov 53'	Report	Milovanović (yellow card) 21'; Đorđević (yellow card) 70'	Stadium: Petrovsky Stadium; Referee: Peter Fröjdfeldt (Sweden)

30 September 2004 2nd leg	Red Star Belgrade (Serbia and Montenegro)	1 – 2 (1 – 6 agg.)	(Russia) Zenit St.Petersburg	Belgrade, Serbia and Montenegro
21:30 MSK (UTC+4)	Pantelić 17'; Janković (yellow card) 41'; Miladinović (yellow card) 58'	Report	Spivak (yellow card) 25' (goal) 58' (pen.); Makarov 84' (yellow card) 84'	Stadium: Red Star Stadium; Referee: Michael Weiner (Germany)

==== Group stage ====
Pos	Team	Pld	W	D	L	GF	GA	GD	Pts	Qualification	LIL	SEV	AAC	ZEN	AEK
1	(France) Lille	4	3	0	1	5	3	+2	9	Advance to knockout stage	—	1–0	—	2–1	—
2	(Spain) Sevilla	4	2	1	1	6	4	+2	7	Advance to knockout stage	—	—	2–0	—	3–2
3	(Germany) Alemannia Aachen	4	2	1	1	5	4	+1	7	Advance to knockout stage	1–0	—	—	2–2	—
4	(Russia) Zenit Saint Petersburg	4	1	2	1	9	6	+3	5		—	1–1	—	—	5–1
5	(Greece) AEK Athens	4	0	0	4	4	12	−8	0		1–2	—	0–2	—	—

Source: RSSSF

21 October 2004 1	Zenit St.Petersburg (Russia)	5 – 1	(Greece) AEK Athens	Saint Petersburg, Russia
20:00 MSK (UTC+4)	Arshavin 44'; Kerzhakov 48', 54', 78'; Denisov 86'	Report	Krassas 3'; Katsouranis (yellow card) 50'; Bruno Alves (yellow card) 65'	Stadium: Petrovsky Stadium; Referee: Antonio Costa (Portugal)

4 November 2004 2	Lille (France)	2 – 1	(Russia) Zenit St.Petersburg	Villeneuve-d'Ascq, France
23:45 MSK (UTC+4)	Tafforeau 35' (yellow card) 43'; Landrin (yellow card) 40'; Moussilou 41'; Tavlaridis (yellow card) 62'	Report	Horshkov (yellow card) 22'; Šumulikoski (yellow card) 34'; Kerzhakov 38'; Škrtel (yellow card) 55'; Denisov (yellow card) 61'	Stadium: Stadium Lille Métropole; Referee: Philippe Leuba (Switzerland)

25 November 2004 3	Zenit St.Petersburg (Russia)	1 – 1	(Spain) Sevilla	Saint Petersburg, Russia
21:00 MSK (UTC+4)	Arshavin (yellow card) 29' (goal) 35'; Spivak (yellow card) 36'; Šumulikoski (yellow card) 40'; Chiriță (yellow card) 68'	Report	Ramos (yellow card) 36'; Baptista 71'; Carlitos (yellow card) 78'	Stadium: Petrovsky Stadium; Referee: Dougie McDonald (Scotland)

2 December 2004 4	Alemannia Aachen (Germany)	2 – 2	(Russia) Zenit St.Petersburg	Cologne, Germany
23:45 MSK (UTC+4)	Meijer 25'; Sichone (yellow card) 37'; Blank 88' (pen.); Pinto (yellow card) .' (yellow-red card) 90+1'	Report	Šírl (yellow card) 35'; Denisov (yellow card) 45'; Radimov 37' (pen.); Horshkov 75'; Flachbart (yellow card) 88'	Stadium: RheinEnergieStadion; Referee: Sorin Carpodean (Romania)

== Squad statistics ==
As of match played 2 December 2004

=== Appearances and goals ===
No.	Pos	Nat	Player	Total		Premier League		03/04 Russian Cup		04/05 Russian Cup		UEFA Cup	
No.	Pos	Nat	Player	Apps	Goals	Apps	Goals	Apps	Goals	Apps	Goals	Apps	Goals
1	GK	(Slovakia) SVK	Kamil Čontofalský	8	0	4	0	1	0	2	0	1	0
2	MF	(Russia) RUS	Vladislav Radimov	25	4	18+1	3	0	0	1	0	5	1
3	DF	(Slovakia) SVK	Martin Škrtel	14	0	7	0	0	0	2	0	4+1	0
4	DF	(Czech Republic) CZE	Martin Horák	31	1	21+3	1	1	0	1	0	4+1	0
5	DF	(Serbia and Montenegro) SCG	Milan Vještica	21	1	14+1	0	1	0	0+1	0	3+1	1
6	MF	(Ukraine) UKR	Oleksandr Spivak	35	11	27	10	1	0	0	0	7	1
7	FW	(Russia) RUS	Dmitri Makarov	14	4	2+6	0	0	0	2	3	0+4	1
8	DF	(Czech Republic) CZE	Pavel Mareš	39	3	28	3	1	0	2	0	8	0
9	MF	(Czech Republic) CZE	Radek Šírl	13	1	9+1	1	0+1	0	1	0	1	0
10	MF	(Russia) RUS	Andrey Arshavin	37	10	28	6	1	0	0	0	8	4
11	FW	(Russia) RUS	Aleksandr Kerzhakov	38	29	28+1	18	1	0	1	5	7	6
15	FW	(Czech Republic) CZE	Lukáš Hartig	22	4	1+14	3	0	0	1+1	1	2+3	0
16	GK	(Russia) RUS	Vyacheslav Malafeev	26	0	19	0	0	0	0	0	7	0
17	MF	(Bosnia and Herzegovina) BIH	Darko Maletić	4	0	1+1	0	0	0	1	0	1	0
19	MF	(North Macedonia) MKD	Veliče Šumulikoski	34	0	24+1	0	0	0	2	0	6+1	0
20	DF	(Russia) RUS	Aleksei Katulsky	14	0	8+3	0	0	0	0+2	0	0+1	0
24	MF	(Russia) RUS	Aleksandr Burakov	2	0	0+1	0	0	0	0+1	0	0	0
25	DF	(Romania) ROU	Daniel Chiriță	25	0	9+8	0	1	0	2	0	5	0
27	MF	(Russia) RUS	Igor Denisov	27	7	13+7	6	0	0	0	0	4+3	1
28	DF	(Czech Republic) CZE	Jan Flachbart	14	0	9+1	0	0	0	0	0	3+1	0
31	GK	(Russia) RUS	Sergey Ivanov	7	0	7	0	0	0	0	0	0	0
32	DF	(Lithuania) LTU	Egidijus Majus	7	0	4+2	0	0	0	1	0	0	0
34	MF	(Russia) RUS	Vladimir Bystrov	29	2	18+3	1	1	1	1	0	6	0
43	MF	(Russia) RUS	Oleg Vlasov	24	1	6+12	1	0	0	1	0	1+4	0
45	FW	(Russia) RUS	Nikolay Bugmyrin	1	0	0	0	0	0	0+1	0	0	0
88	MF	(Ukraine) UKR	Oleksandr Horshkov	36	4	23+4	2	1	0	0	0	5+3	2
Players who left Zenit during the season:
28	FW	(Czech Republic) CZE	Marek Kincl	7	0	1+5	0	0+1	0	0	0	0	0
77	MF	(Russia) RUS	Konstantin Konoplyov	10	0	1+7	0	1	0	1	0	0	0

=== Goal scorers ===
Place	Position	Nation	Number	Name	Premier League	03/04 Russian Cup	04/05 Russian Cup	UEFA Cup	Total
1	FW	(Russia)	11	Aleksandr Kerzhakov	18	0	5	6	29
2	MF	(Ukraine)	6	Oleksandr Spivak	10	0	0	1	11
3	MF	(Russia)	10	Andrey Arshavin	6	0	0	4	10
4	MF	(Russia)	27	Igor Denisov	6	0	0	1	7
5	FW	(Czech Republic)	15	Lukáš Hartig	3	0	1	0	4
5	MF	(Russia)	2	Vladislav Radimov	3	0	0	1	4
5	MF	(Ukraine)	88	Oleksandr Horshkov	2	0	0	2	4
5	FW	(Russia)	7	Dmitri Makarov	0	0	3	1	4
9	DF	(Czech Republic)	8	Pavel Mareš	3	0	0	0	3
10	MF	(Russia)	34	Vladimir Bystrov	1	1	0	0	2
11	MF	(Czech Republic)	9	Radek Šírl	1	0	0	0	1
11	DF	(Czech Republic)	4	Martin Horák	1	0	0	0	1
11	MF	(Russia)	43	Oleg Vlasov	1	0	0	0	1
11	DF	(Serbia and Montenegro)	5	Milan Vještica	0	0	0	1	1
11				Own goal	0	0	0	1	1
				TOTALS	55	1	9	18	83

=== Clean sheets ===
Place	Position	Nation	Number	Name	Premier League	03/04 Russian Cup	04/05 Russian Cup	UEFA Cup	Total
1	GK	(Russia)	16	Vyacheslav Malafeev	9	0	0	2	11
2	GK	(Russia)	31	Sergey Ivanov	2	0	0	0	2
3	GK	(Czech Republic)	1	Kamil Čontofalský	0	0	1	0	1
				TOTALS	11	0	1	2	14

=== Disciplinary record ===
Number	Nation	Position	Name	Premier League		03/04 Russian Cup		04/05 Russian Cup		UEFA Cup		Total	
Number	Nation	Position	Name	Booked	Sent off (straight red)	Booked	Sent off (straight red)	Booked	Sent off (straight red)	Booked	Sent off (straight red)	Booked	Sent off (straight red)
2	(Russia)	MF	Vladislav Radimov	7	0	0	0	0	0	0	0	7	0
3	(Slovakia)	DF	Martin Škrtel	3	0	0	0	0	0	1	0	4	0
4	(Czech Republic)	DF	Martin Horák	4	0	0	0	1	0	0	0	5	0
5	(Serbia and Montenegro)	DF	Milan Vještica	2	1	0	0	1	0	1	0	4	1
6	(Ukraine)	MF	Oleksandr Spivak	4	0	0	0	0	0	2	0	6	0
7	(Russia)	FW	Dmitri Makarov	0	0	0	0	0	0	1	0	1	0
8	(Czech Republic)	DF	Pavel Mareš	6	0	0	0	0	0	0	0	6	0
9	(Czech Republic)	MF	Radek Šírl	3	0	0	0	0	0	1	0	4	0
10	(Russia)	MF	Andrey Arshavin	7	0	0	0	0	0	2	0	9	0
11	(Russia)	FW	Aleksandr Kerzhakov	0	0	1	0	0	0	1	0	2	0
15	(Czech Republic)	FW	Lukáš Hartig	3	1	0	0	1	0	0	0	4	1
16	(Russia)	GK	Vyacheslav Malafeev	2	0	0	0	0	0	0	0	2	0
17	(Bosnia and Herzegovina)	MF	Darko Maletić	0	0	0	0	1	0	0	0	1	0
19	(North Macedonia)	MF	Veliče Šumulikoski	5	0	0	0	1	0	3	0	9	0
25	(Romania)	DF	Daniel Chiriță	3	1	1	0	0	0	1	0	5	1
27	(Russia)	MF	Igor Denisov	2	0	0	0	0	0	2	0	4	0
28	(Czech Republic)	DF	Jan Flachbart	2	0	0	0	0	0	1	0	3	0
34	(Russia)	MF	Vladimir Bystrov	2	1	1	0	0	0	0	0	3	1
43	(Russia)	MF	Oleg Vlasov	1	0	0	0	0	0	0	0	1	0
88	(Ukraine)	MF	Oleksandr Horshkov	7	0	0	0	0	0	1	0	8	0
Players away on loan:
Players who left Zenit St.Petersburg during the season:
77	(Russia)	MF	Konstantin Konoplyov	1	0	0	0	1	0	0	0	2	0
			TOTALS	64	4	3	0	6	0	17	0	90	4
