= Valeri Lebedev =

Valeri Lebedev may refer to:

- Valeri Lebedev (footballer, born 1969), Russian football player
- Valeri Lebedev (footballer, born 1976), Russian football player
