= Ushenin =

Ushenin (Russian: Ушенин) is a Russian masculine surname, while its feminine counterpart is Ushenina.

Notable people with the surname include:

- Andrei Ushenin (born 1983), Russian footballer
- Anna Ushenina (born 1985), Ukrainian chess grandmaster
