= Burakov =

Burakov (Russian: Бураков) is a Russian masculine surname, its feminine counterpart is Burakova. Notable people with the surname include:

- Aleksandr Burakov (born 1987), Russian football player
- Marina Burakova (born 1966), Russian football player
- Viktor Burakov (1955–2025), Ukrainian sprinter
- Vladimir Burakov (1954–2024), Russian politician
- Volodymyr Burakov (born 1985), Ukrainian sprinter
