= Carlos Chaile =

Argentine footballer

Personal information
- Full name: Carlos Walter Ariel Chaile
- Date of birth: January 14, 1975 (age 51)
- Place of birth: Bella Vista, Argentina
- Height: 1.82 m (6 ft 0 in)
- Position: Central defender

Team information
- Current team: SK Austria Kärnten

Senior career*
Years	Team	Apps	(Gls)
1996–1998	Ferro Carril Oeste	49	(5)
1998–1999	Gimnasia y Tiro	30	(0)
1999–2001	Almagro	32	(0)
2001–2003	St. Gallen	34	(0)
2003–2007	Pasching	115	(9)
2007–2009	SK Austria Kärnten	54	(4)
- * Club domestic league appearances and goals as of 08:38, 20 April 2009 (UTC)

Carlos Chaile (born 14 January 1975 in Bella Vista in Tucumán Province) is an Argentine football player, currently playing for Austrian team.

In Argentina, Chaile played with Ferro Carril Oeste, Club Almagro, and Gimnasia y Tiro de Salta, before moving to Europe in 2001, to join St. Gallen in the Swiss Super League. In 2003, he was signed by Austrian club FC Superfund. His contract with the team is valid until 2007. He last played for SK Austria Kärnten.
