= Patrice M'Bock =

Cameroonian footballer

Personal information
- Full name: Joseph Patrice M'Bock
- Date of birth: 20 April 1983 (age 43)
- Place of birth: Edéa, Cameroon
- Height: 1.81 m (5 ft 11 in)
- Position: Defender

Youth career
- –2001: AJ Auxerre

Senior career*
Years	Team	Apps	(Gls)
2001–2005	FC Bayern Munich (A)	90	(0)
2005–2007	FC Superfund	16	(0)
2007–2010	SV Horn		
2010	ASKÖ Donau Linz		
- * Club domestic league appearances and goals

Joseph Patrice M'Bock (born 20 April 1983) is a former Cameroonian footballer who played as a defender.

M'Bock was born in Edéa. For FC Superfund, M'Bock made 16 appearances in the Austrian Football Bundesliga and played in both legs of the 2005–06 UEFA Cup qualifying rounds.

== Career statistics ==
Club	Season	League		Cup		Europe		Total	
Club	Season	Apps	Goals	Apps	Goals	Apps	Goals	Apps	Goals
FC Bayern Munich (A)	2001–02	12	0	0	0	0	0	12	0
FC Bayern Munich (A)	2002–03	20	0	1	0	0	0	21	0
FC Bayern Munich (A)	2003–04	29	0	0	0	0	0	29	0
FC Bayern Munich (A)	2004–05	29	0	4	0	0	0	33	0
Total		90	0	5	0	0	0	95	0
FC Superfund	2005–06	11	0	0	0	2	0	13	0
FC Superfund	2006–07	5	0	0	0	0	0	5	0
Total		16	0	0	0	2	0	18	0
Career total		106	0	5	0	2	0	113	0
