= Valeri Lebedev (footballer, born 1969) =

Russian footballer

Personal information
- Full name: Valeri Mikhailovich Lebedev
- Date of birth: 13 June 1969 (age 57)
- Place of birth: Magadan, Russian SFSR
- Height: 1.78 m (5 ft 10 in)
- Positions: Defender; midfielder

Senior career*
Years	Team	Apps	(Gls)
1991–1993	FC Luch Vladivostok	68	(1)
1994–1995	FC Olimpia Bălți	25	(3)
1996–1998	FC Zimbru Chișinău	41	(1)
1999	Roma Bălți	5	(0)
1999	FC Khimki	13	(0)
2000	FC Serpukhov (amateur)		
2002	FC Malakhit-Pushkino Pushkino		
2004	FC Boyevoye Bratstvo Pushkino		
- * Club domestic league appearances and goals

Valeri Mikhailovich Lebedev (Russian: Валерий Михайлович Лебедев; born 13 June 1969 in Magadan) is a former Russian football player.

== Honours ==
Olimpia Bălți

- Moldovan National Division bronze: 1994–95

Zimbru Chișinău

- Moldovan National Division champion: 1995–96, 1997–98
- Moldovan National Division runner-up: 1996–97
- Moldovan Cup winner: 1996–97, 1997–98
