= Mantas Samusiovas =

Lithuanian footballer

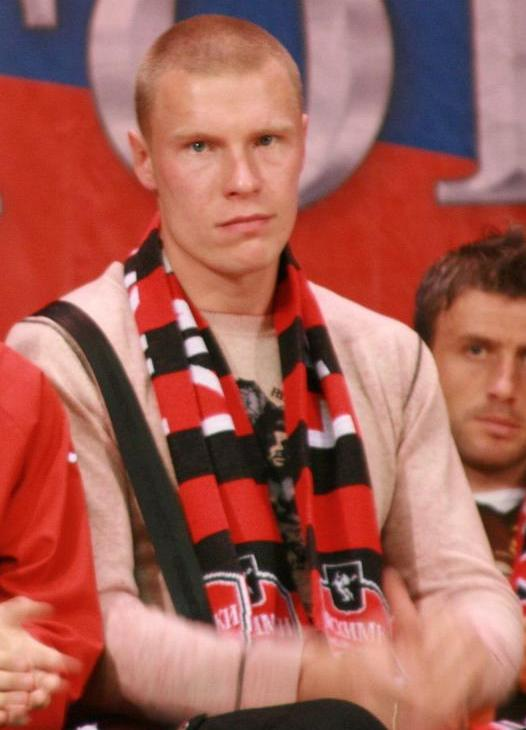

Personal information
- Full name: Mantas Samusiovas
- Date of birth: 8 September 1978 (age 48)
- Place of birth: Kaunas, Lithuanian SSR, Soviet Union
- Height: 1.85 m (6 ft 1 in)
- Position: Defender

Senior career*
Years	Team	Apps	(Gls)
1994–1999	FBK Kaunas	100	(15)
1995	→ Alsa Vilnius (loan)	4	(0)
1999	FK Nevėžis		
2000–2002	Skonto FC	51	(5)
2003–2005	Torpedo Moscow	45	(4)
2006	FK Sūduva	15	(2)
2006–2008	FC Khimki	32	(1)
2009	FK Sūduva	11	(0)
2009	Illichivets Mariupol	27	(0)
2010	FK Sūduva	?	(?)
2011–2012	FK Ekranas	45	(3)
2013	FK Šilas Kazlų Rūda		

International career
1999	Lithuania	5	(0)
- * Club domestic league appearances and goals

Mantas Samusiovas (born 8 September 1978) is a former Lithuanian footballer.
