= Mikhail Kozlov (footballer) =

Russian footballer

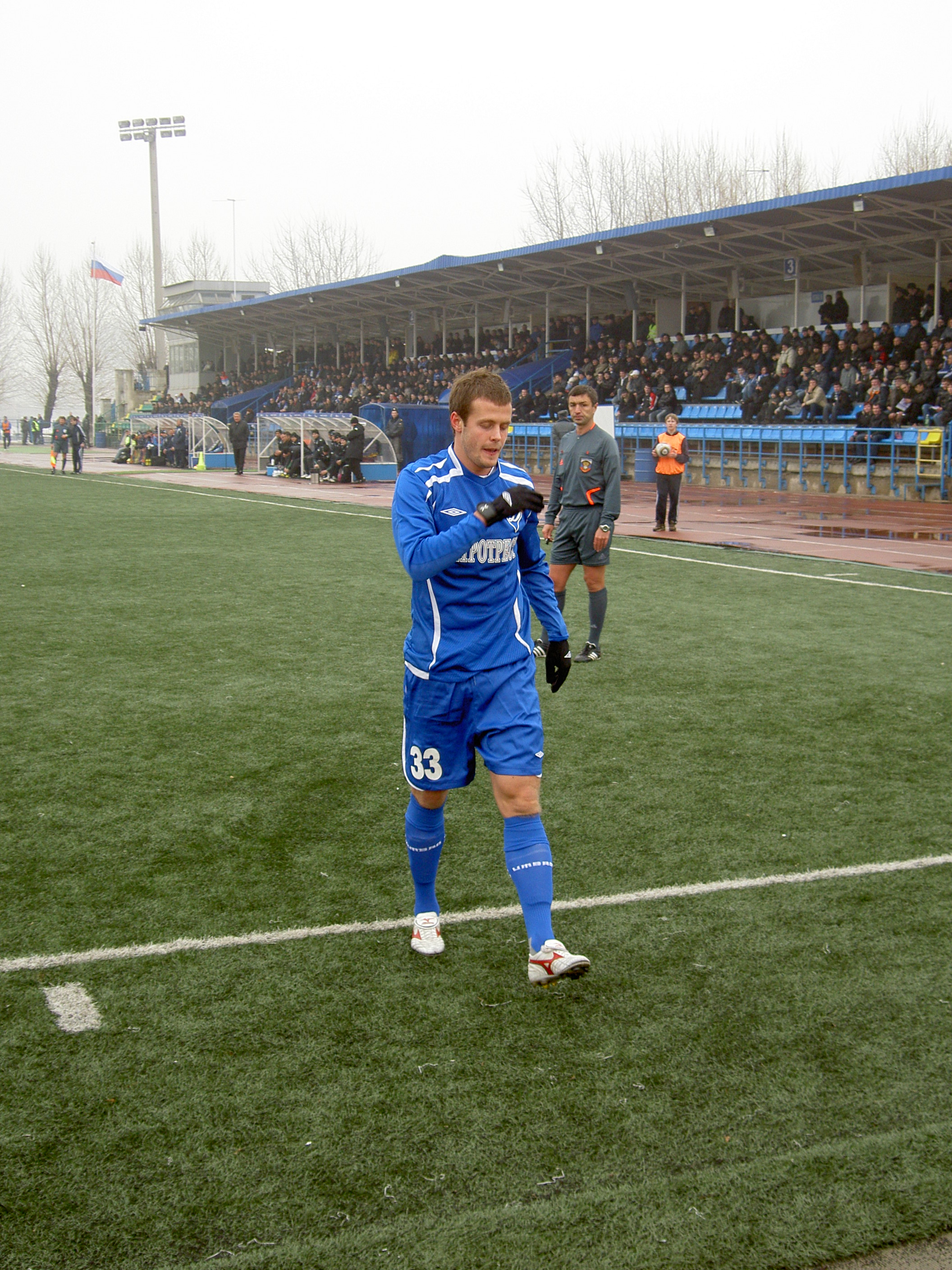

Personal information
- Full name: Mikhail Sergeyevich Kozlov
- Date of birth: 2 November 1986 (age 39)
- Place of birth: Leningrad, Russia, Soviet Union
- Height: 1.77 m (5 ft 10 in)
- Position: Midfielder

Youth career
- FC Smena St. Petersburg

Senior career*
Years	Team	Apps	(Gls)
2004	FC Zenit-2 St. Petersburg	26	(5)
2005–2006	FC Zenit St. Petersburg	3	(0)
2007	FC Tekstilshchik-Telekom Ivanovo	34	(1)
2008–2009	FC Rostov	21	(4)
2008	→ FC Ural Sverdlovsk Oblast (loan)	10	(2)
2009	→ FC Vityaz Podolsk (loan)	29	(0)
2010	FC Dynamo St. Petersburg	34	(3)
2011–2013	FC Petrotrest St. Petersburg	22	(4)
2013	FC Rus St. Petersburg	21	(1)
2014	FC Sokol Saratov	15	(2)
2015–2016	FC Luch-Energiya Vladivostok	36	(1)
2016–2017	FC Dynamo Saint Petersburg	35	(5)
2017	→ FC Dynamo-2 Saint Petersburg	6	(0)

International career
2003	Russia U-17	4	(2)
2005	Russia U-19	9	(4)
- * Club domestic league appearances and goals

Mikhail Sergeyevich Kozlov (Russian: Михаил Серге́евич Козлов; born 2 November 1986) is a Russian former professional footballer.

== Club career ==
He made his debut in the Russian Premier League in 2005 for FC Zenit St. Petersburg and played one game for them in the UEFA Cup 2005–06.
