= Eduard Dyomin =

Russian footballer

Personal information
- Full name: Eduard Viktorovich Dyomin
- Date of birth: 26 March 1974 (age 52)
- Place of birth: Kaluga, Russian SFSR
- Height: 1.89 m (6 ft 2 in)
- Position: Defender

Team information
- Current team: FC Kaluga (assistant coach)

Senior career*
Years	Team	Apps	(Gls)
1991	FC Zarya Kaluga	0	(0)
1992	FC Presnya Moscow	29	(0)
1992–1994	FC Asmaral Moscow	34	(0)
1995–1996	FC Dynamo Moscow	3	(1)
1997–1999	FC Chernomorets Novorossiysk	77	(9)
2000–2001	FC Torpedo-ZIL Moscow	22	(0)
2001–2002	FC Volgar-Gazprom Astrakhan	31	(0)
2003–2004	FC Kuban Krasnodar	55	(1)
2005	FC Lokomotiv Kaluga	14	(0)
2006	FC Volgar-Gazprom Astrakhan	33	(1)
2007	FC Oruzheynik Tula		
2008–2009	FC Zvezda Serpukhov	57	(0)

Managerial career
- 2010–2013: FC Kaluga
- 2014–2015: FC Kolomna
- 2015: FC Oryol
- 2016–2018: FC Kaluga (assistant)
- 2018: FC Kaluga
- 2019–: FC Kaluga (assistant)
- * Club domestic league appearances and goals

Eduard Viktorovich Dyomin (Russian: Эдуард Викторович Дёмин; born 26 March 1974) is a Russian football manager and a former player. He is an assistant coach with FC Kaluga.

== Club career ==
He made his debut in the Russian Premier League in 1993 for FC Asmaral Moscow and played 1 game in the UEFA Cup 1996–97 for FC Dynamo Moscow.

== Personal life ==
His son Dmitri Dyomin is now a footballer.
