= Dmitri Burmistrov =

Russian professional footballer

Personal information
- Full name: Dmitri Aleksandrovich Burmistrov
- Date of birth: 14 October 1983 (age 43)
- Place of birth: Tula, Soviet Union
- Height: 1.95 m (6 ft 5 in)
- Position: Forward

Youth career
- FC Rostov

Senior career*
Years	Team	Apps	(Gls)
2001–2003	FC Rostov (reserves)		
2004–2008	FC Rostov	41	(2)
2007	→ FC SKA Rostov-on-Don (loan)	15	(4)
2008	→ FC Chernomorets Novorossiysk (loan)	3	(0)
2009	FC Salyut-Energia Belgorod	6	(0)
2009	→ FC Zvezda Serpukhov (loan)	10	(7)
2010	FC Torpedo Moscow	25	(10)
2011–2013	FC Salyut Belgorod	45	(12)
2013–2014	FC Avangard Kursk	34	(3)
2014	FC Energomash Belgorod (amateur)		
2015	FC Energomash Belgorod	13	(0)
- * Club domestic league appearances and goals

Dmitri Aleksandrovich Burmistrov (Russian: Дмитрий Александрович Бурмистров; born 14 October 1983) is a Russian former professional footballer.

== Club career ==
He made his debut in the Russian Premier League in 2004 for FC Rostov.
