= Bella Vista, Tucumán =

Bella Vista
- City
- Flag

- Location of Bella Vista in Argentina
- Coordinates: 27°02′S 65°18′W
- Country: Argentina
- Province: Tucumán
- Department: Leales

Government
  - Intendant: Paula Quiles (UCR)

Population
  - Total: 15,126
- Demonym: bellavistence
- Time zone: UTC−3 (ART)
- CPA base: T4168
- Dialing code: +54 0381

Bella Vista is a small city in southeastern Tucumán Province, Argentina. It is located 25 km (16 mi) south of the provincial capital of Tucumán.

== Overview ==
Known in its early years as Los Tres Bajos ("The Three Hollows"), Bella Vista grew around the sugar plantation of the same name. Founded in the early twentieth century by Manuel García Fernández, the plantation became known for his efforts to diversify its crop production. Faced with falling sugar prices, García invested in ethyl alcohol and cellulose production, as well as a silkworm farm. García also established a planned community for his employees, consisting of a row of homes lining Avenida de las Moreras, and with the establishment of the Norwinco match factory and other employers, Bella Vista became a small urban center by the time García's farm was sold during a sugar agricultural market crisis in 1965.

Luis "Lucho" Díaz, the town Justice of the Peace during the 1960s, was a published poet who contributed significantly to Bella Vista's cultural life, helping establish the Centro Juvenil Cultural and the Teatro Vocacional de Bella Vista. The late 1960s, which coincided with the President Juan Carlos Onganía's cancellation of sugar subsidies, and the resulting closure of numerous large mills, also made the town a center of labor union activity. Led by a Bella Vista local, Atilio Santillán, the Sugar Workers' Federation of Tucumán (FOTIA) grew to include over 70,000 members. Opposition from Tucumán authorities led to their persecution during the Operativo Independencia offensive of 1975, in addition to which a conflict with the far-left People's Revolutionary Army (ERP) band arose, leading to Santillán's death on March 22, 1976 (an unsolved mystery). The sugar mill, which had been purchased by the CONASA state sugar concern in 1973, was privatized in 1977.

The town's numerous governmental controversies since 1999 have earned it significant notoriety throughout the Province of Tucumán.

=== Suspension of City Council ===
Rodi Humano, a transvestite fortune teller, received the highest number of votes for any city council candidate in elections held in 2003, entitling him to the post of City Council President. Humano's previous occupation, as well as his attending city council meetings as a woman, caused tensions among members of the city council.

Humano's election sparked significant controversy among local politicians and some local residents. As a result of significant political and local pressure, provincial governor José Alperovich suspended the Bella Vista council. The city continues to operate under the sole direction of the mayor.

=== Mayoral election fraud allegations ===
In 2007, José Domingo Décima and José Coronel, former candidates for the office of mayor of Bella Vista, alleged that the incumbent mayor, Luis Espeche, had misappropriated city funds in exchange for votes to ensure his re-election victory.

In support of their allegations that upwards of 4 million Argentine pesos allocated for construction of surface irrigation canals had been misappropriated, Décima and Coronel published a series of photographs displaying areas of the city where no work had been done. Décima and Coronel claim the city could not account for how the funds had actually been spent, and have accused Espeche, who has been in sole control of city finances since the dissolution of the city council, of using the funds to bribe voters and ensure a victory for his candidacy. Although no charges have been filed, Décima has threatened to pursue an official inquiry into the matter.
