= Yury Morozov (footballer, born 1985) =

Russian footballer

Personal information
- Full name: Yury Yuryevich Morozov
- Date of birth: 23 October 1985 (age 41)
- Place of birth: Mykolaiv, Ukrainian SSR
- Height: 1.84 m (6 ft 0 in)
- Position: Defender

Senior career*
Years	Team	Apps	(Gls)
2004–2006	FC Shinnik Yaroslavl	0	(0)
2007	FC Olimpia Volgograd	10	(0)
2008	FC Kavkaztransgaz-2005 Ryzdvyany	27	(0)
2009	FC Astrakhan	30	(2)
2010	FC Dynamo Bryansk	12	(0)
2011–2012	FC Avangard Kursk	31	(7)
2012–2014	FC Tyumen	34	(2)
2014–2016	FC Tekstilshchik Ivanovo	39	(3)
2016–2019	FC Nizhny Novgorod	98	(4)
2020–2021	FC Tekstilshchik Ivanovo	20	(1)
2021–2022	FC Chertanovo Moscow	4	(0)
- * Club domestic league appearances and goals

Yury Yuryevich Morozov (Russian: Юрий Юрьевич Морозов; born 23 October 1985) is a Russian former professional football player.

== Early life ==
Born in 1985 in Nikolaev, Ukrainian SSR, he has two older sisters. Yuri's father wanted his son to become a footballer and moved with him to Moscow to achieve this, while his mother and daughters remained in Nikolaev.

== Club career ==
He made his professional debut for FC Shinnik Yaroslavl on 20 April 2005 in a Russian Cup game against FC Zenit Saint Petersburg.

He made his Russian Football National League debut for FC Dynamo Bryansk on 27 March 2010 in a game against FC Shinnik Yaroslavl.
