= Oleksandr Spivak =

Ukrainian footballer

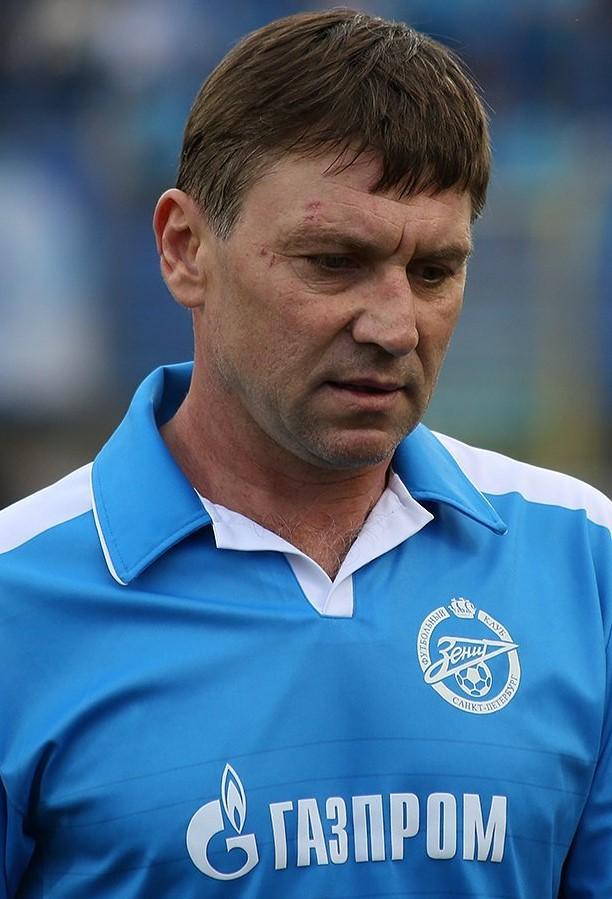

Personal information
- Full name: Oleksandr Serhiyovych Spivak
- Date of birth: 6 January 1975 (age 51)
- Place of birth: Mariupol, Ukraine
- Height: 1.76 m (5 ft 9 in)
- Position: Attacking midfielder

Senior career*
Years	Team	Apps	(Gls)
1992–1993	Silur Khartsyzsk	33	(3)
1994	Stal Mielec	16	(0)
1994	SC Odesa	9	(2)
1994–1995	Chornomorets Odesa	19	(0)
1995–1998	Shakhtar Donetsk	61	(9)
1997–1998	→ Shakhtar-2 Donetsk	17	(6)
1998	→ Stal Alchevsk (loan)	1	(0)
1998–1999	Zirka Kirovohrad	21	(3)
1998	→ Zirka-2 Kirovohrad	2	(0)
1999–2000	Metalurh Zaporizhzhia	23	(2)
1999–2000	→ Metalurh-2 Zaporizhzhia	1	(0)
2000–2007	Zenit Saint Petersburg	145	(33)
Total		348	(58)

International career
2001–2002	Ukraine	3	(0)
- * Club domestic league appearances and goals

Oleksandr Serhiyovych Spivak (born 6 January 1975) is a Ukrainian former professional footballer who played as an attacking midfielder. He retired in 2007 after a seven-year long stint with Zenit Saint Petersburg. Before coming to Zenit, Spivak has been with multiple clubs including Silur Khartsyzsk, Stal Mielec, SC Odesa, Shakhtar Donetsk, Stal Alchevsk, Metallurg, Zirka Kirovohrad, Chornomorets Odesa. A former Ukrainian international, Spivak also has Russian citizenship.
