= Stanislav Tarasyuk =

Russian footballer

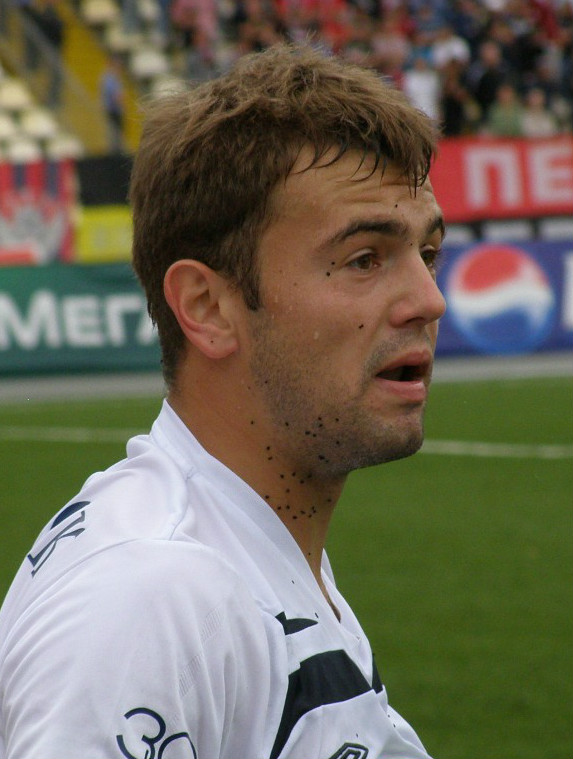

Personal information
- Full name: Stanislav Sergeyevich Tarasyuk
- Date of birth: 5 January 1987 (age 39)
- Height: 1.74 m (5 ft 9 in)
- Positions: Defender; midfielder

Senior career*
Years	Team	Apps	(Gls)
2003–2005	FC Zenit St. Petersburg	0	(0)
2005–2007	FC Zenit-2 St. Petersburg	61	(0)
2008	FC Vityaz Podolsk	5	(1)
2009–2010	FC Avangard Podolsk	50	(1)
2011–2013	FC Petrotrest Saint Petersburg	65	(3)
2013–2014	FC Tosno	21	(0)
2014–2015	FC Neftekhimik Nizhnekamsk	23	(0)
- * Club domestic league appearances and goals

Stanislav Sergeyevich Tarasyuk (Russian: Станислав Серге́евич Тарасюк; born 5 January 1987) is a Russian former professional football player.

== Club career ==
He played two seasons in the Russian Football National League for FC Vityaz Podolsk and FC Petrotrest Saint Petersburg.
