= Egidijus Majus =

Lithuanian footballer

Personal information
- Date of birth: 5 January 1984 (age 42)
- Height: 1.89 m (6 ft 2 1/2 in)
- Position: Defender

Team information
- Current team: Dinamo Samarqand
- Number: 15

Youth career
- Ekranas

Senior career*
Years	Team	Apps	(Gls)
2002–2004	Ekranas	82	(4)
2004–2008	Zenit St. Petersburg	0	(0)
2008–2009	Vėtra	9	(0)
2009–2010	DAC Dunajská Streda	17	(1)
2010	Ekranas	7	(0)
2010–2011	Steel Azin	1	(0)
2011	DAC Dunajská Streda	4	(0)
2012–	Dinamo Samarqand	1	(0)

International career^{‡}
2008	Lithuania	1	(0)
- * Club domestic league appearances and goals as of 1 May 2012 ‡ National team caps and goals as of 4 October 2008

Egidijus Majus (born 5 January 1984) is a Lithuanian footballer currently playing for Dinamo Samarqand. His former club were DAC Dunajská Streda and Steel Azin.

He played 1 game for Zenit St. Petersburg main squad in the Russian Cup.
