= Lukáš Hartig =

Czech footballer

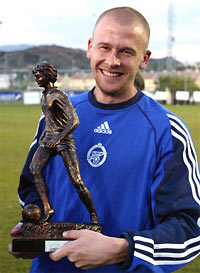

Personal information
- Full name: Lukáš Hartig
- Date of birth: 28 October 1976 (age 50)
- Place of birth: Býchory, Czechoslovakia
- Height: 1.85 m (6 ft 1 in)
- Position: Forward

Youth career
- 1991–1995: Sokol Býchory

Senior career*
Years	Team	Apps	(Gls)
1995–1998	Sokol Býchory		
1998–2000	AFK Velim	29	(33)
2000–2001	Bohemians 1905	34	(7)
2001–2002	Sparta Prague	11	(3)
2002–2003	Bohemians 1905	14	(2)
2003–2005	Zenit St. Petersburg	23	(3)
2005–2006	Artmedia Petržalka	25	(8)
2006–2008	Sigma Olomouc	23	(3)
2008–2012	Bohemians 1905	54	(6)
2011	→Slovan Bratislava (loan)	8	(0)
2012–2014	Kolín		
Total		221	(65)
- * Club domestic league appearances and goals

Lukáš Hartig (born 28 October 1976) is a Czech former professional footballer who played as a striker.

He stands 185 cm tall and weighs 76 kg. He played for Zenit St. Petersburg since 2003 and transferred to Artmedia in August 2005. In 2006, he transferred to Olomouc.
