= Milan Vještica =

Serbian footballer

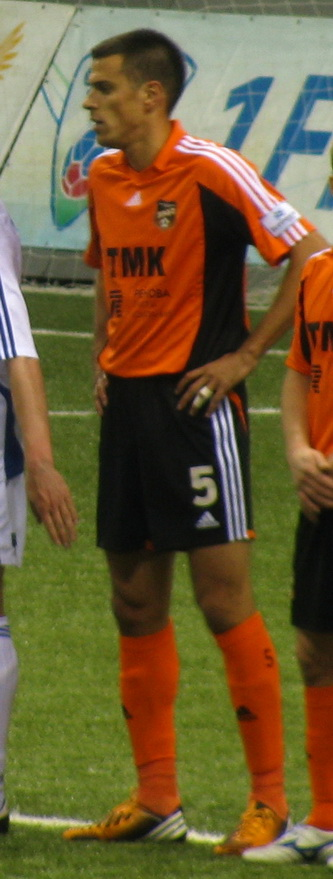
- Vještica with Ural in 2013

Personal information
- Full name: Milan Vještica
- Date of birth: 15 November 1979 (age 46)
- Place of birth: Novi Sad, SFR Yugoslavia
- Height: 1.88 m (6 ft 2 in)
- Position: Defender

Senior career*
Years	Team	Apps	(Gls)
1997–2001	Novi Sad		
2001	Vojvodina	17	(0)
2002–2006	Zenit Saint Petersburg	66	(1)
2006–2007	Rostov	42	(0)
2008	Partizan	9	(0)
2008–2010	Shinnik Yaroslavl	70	(8)
2011	Zhemchuzhina-Sochi	10	(1)
2012–2013	Ural Yekaterinburg	42	(6)
2014	Dynamo Saint Petersburg	9	(0)
Total		265	(16)

International career
2001	FR Yugoslavia U21	1	(0)
- * Club domestic league appearances and goals

Milan Vještica (Serbian Cyrillic: Милан Вјештица; born 15 November 1979) is a retired Serbian professional footballer who played as a defender.

== Club career ==
Vještica began his professional football career with Novi Sad in the late 1990s. He spent several seasons with the Canaries playing in the lower leagues, before moving to their cross-town rivals Vojvodina in the summer of 2001. Vještica stayed just a half a season there, joining Russian club Zenit Saint Petersburg during the 2002 winter transfer window. He spent five seasons at Petrovsky Stadium between 2002 and 2006. In January 2008, Vještica signed a contract with Partizan. In January 2012, Vještica signed a contract with Ural Yekaterinburg. The following year, he helped Ural to win promotion to the Premier League. After the first part of the 2013–14 season, his contract with the club was terminated by mutual consent. On 14 February 2014, Dynamo Saint Petersburg announced the signing of Vještica on a permanent basis.

== International career ==
Vještica made one appearance for the Yugoslav national under-21 team during the qualification campaign for the 2002 UEFA Under-21 Championship.

== Statistics ==
Season	Club	Division	Apps	Goals
Yugoslavia
2001–02	Vojvodina	D1	17	0
Russia
2002	Zenit Saint Petersburg	D1	7	0
2003	Zenit Saint Petersburg	D1	28	0
2004	Zenit Saint Petersburg	D1	15	0
2005	Zenit Saint Petersburg	D1	12	1
2006	Zenit Saint Petersburg	D1	4	0
2006	Rostov	D1	16	0
2007	Rostov	D1	26	0
Serbia
2007–08	Partizan	D1	9	0
Russia
2008	Shinnik Yaroslavl	D1	9	0
2009	Shinnik Yaroslavl	D2	29	0
2010	Shinnik Yaroslavl	D2	32	8
2011–12	Zhemchuzhina-Sochi	D2	10	1
2011–12	Ural Yekaterinburg	D2	5	2
2012–13	Ural Yekaterinburg	D2	24	4
2013–14	Ural Yekaterinburg	D1	13	0
2013–14	Dynamo Saint Petersburg	D2	9	0
Yugoslavia			17	0
Russia			239	16
Serbia			9	0
Total			265	16

== Honours ==
=== Club ===
Zenit Saint Petersburg

- Russian Premier League Cup: 2003

Partizan

- Serbian SuperLiga: 2007–08
- Serbian Cup: 2007–08

Ural Yekaterinburg

- Russian Football National League: 2012–13

=== Individual ===
- Russian Football National League Best Defender: 2010
