= Oleg Kozhanov =

Russian footballer

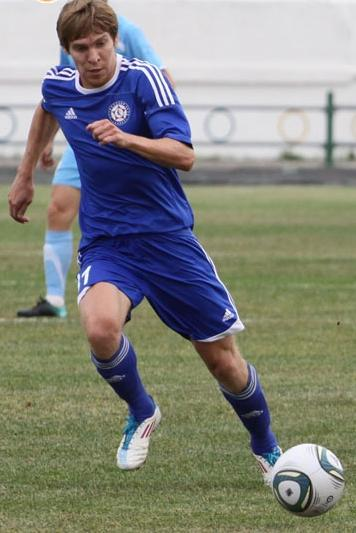

Personal information
- Full name: Oleg Gennadyevich Kozhanov
- Date of birth: 5 June 1987 (age 39)
- Place of birth: Leningrad, Soviet Union
- Height: 1.81 m (5 ft 11 in)
- Position: Striker

Youth career
- 2003–2006: FC Zenit St. Petersburg

Senior career*
Years	Team	Apps	(Gls)
2005–2009	FC Zenit St. Petersburg	9	(1)
2006–2007	→ FC Ural Sverdlovsk Oblast (loan)	46	(11)
2008	→ FC Rostov (loan)	3	(1)
2009	→ FC Khimki (loan)	22	(1)
2010	FC Volga Nizhny Novgorod	25	(2)
2011	FC KAMAZ Naberezhnye Chelny	19	(4)
2012	FC Gazovik Orenburg	6	(0)
2012–2013	FC Yenisey Krasnoyarsk	15	(1)
2013–2014	FC Gazovik Orenburg	17	(1)
2014–2015	FC SKA-Energiya Khabarovsk	20	(0)
2015–2016	FC Dynamo Saint Petersburg	15	(3)

International career
2007–2009	Russia U-21	5	(1)
- * Club domestic league appearances and goals

Oleg Gennadyevich Kozhanov (Russian: Олег Геннадьевич Кожанов; born 5 June 1987) is a Russian former football player.

== Club career ==
He made his debut in the Russian Premier League in 2005 for FC Zenit St. Petersburg.
