= Sergei Kosov =

Russian footballer

Sergey Kosov
Personal information
- Full name: Sergey Andreyevich Kosov
- Date of birth: 31 January 1986 (age 40)
- Height: 1.90 m (6 ft 3 in)
- Position: Goalkeeper

Youth career
- DYuSSh Smena-Zenit
- 2002–2003: Volyn Lutsk

Senior career*
Years	Team	Apps	(Gls)
2002	FC PetroLesPort Saint Petersburg		
2004–2005	FC Zenit Saint Petersburg	0	(0)
2006	JBK	0	(0)
2006	OPA		
2006	FC Lynx	14	(0)
2008	OPA	8	(0)
2008–2009	FC Nistru Otaci	14	(0)
2010	FK Šiauliai	9	(0)
2011	FK Jūrmala-VV	8	(0)
- * Club domestic league appearances and goals

Sergey Andreyevich Kosov (Russian: Серге́й Андреевич Косов; born 31 January 1986) is a former Russian professional footballer.

== Club career ==
In 2010, he made an excellent debut for FK Šiauliai and was one of the best goalkeepers in Lithuanian A Lyga. After the expiry of the contract on 15 November 2010, player moved to FK Jūrmala-VV, playing in the Latvian Higher League. After playing 8 league games he was released.
