= Martin Horák =

Czech footballer (born 1980)

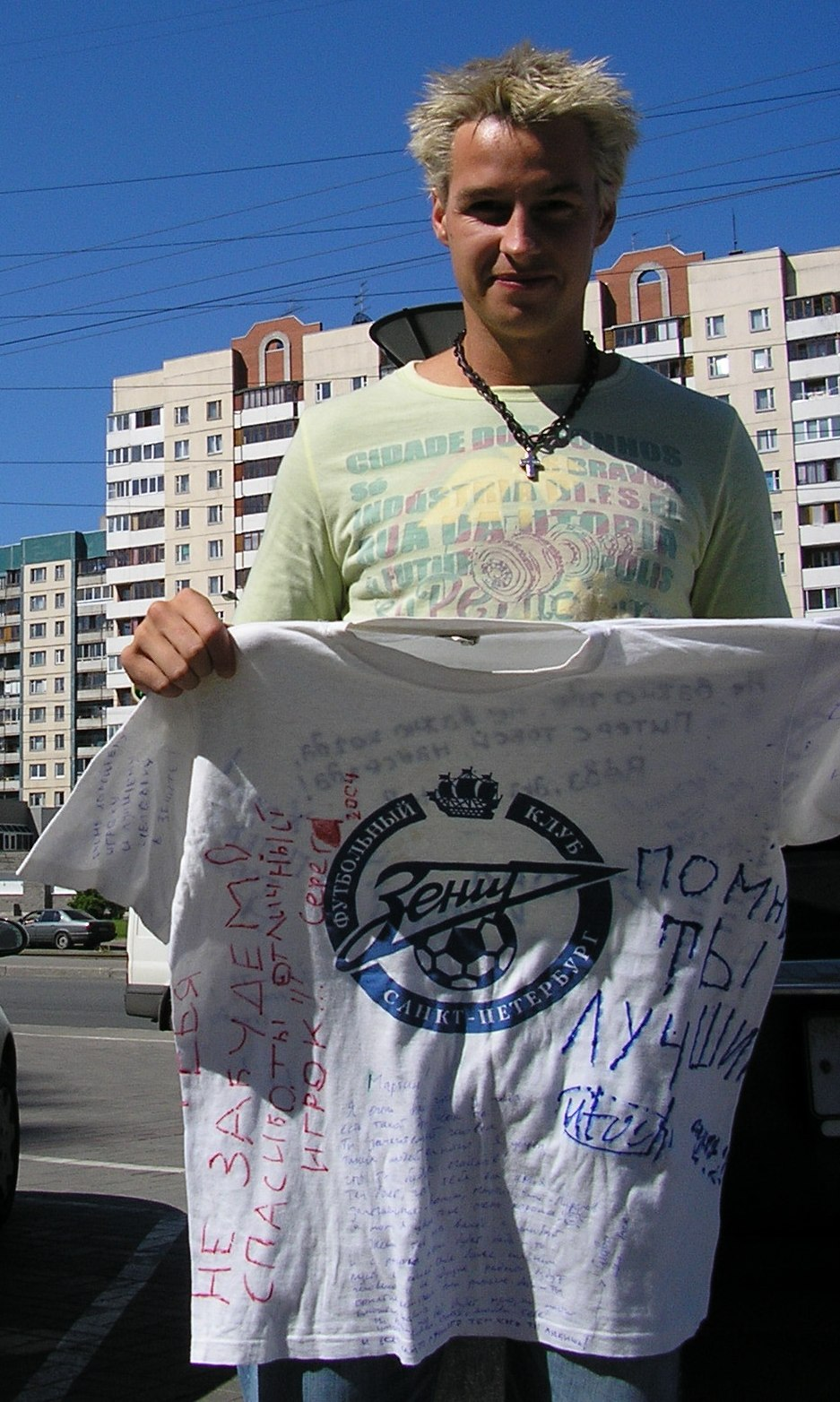
- Martin Horák in 2005

Personal information
- Date of birth: 16 September 1980 (age 46)
- Place of birth: Mohelnice, Czechoslovakia
- Height: 1.87 m (6 ft 1 1/2 in)
- Position: Defender

Youth career
- ?–1999: SK LeRK Prostějov

Senior career*
Years	Team	Apps	(Gls)
1999–2000	SK LeRK Prostějov		
2000–2001	FC Viktoria Plzeň	14	(2)
2001–2002	Bohemians 1905	19	(5)
2002	Sparta Prague	10	(2)
2003–2006	FC Zenit St. Petersburg	45	(3)
2005	→ Denizlispor (loan)		
2005	→ FC Rostov (loan)	9	(1)
2006	→ FC Shinnik Yaroslavl (loan)	24	(1)
2007	FC Rostov	12	(0)
2008–2010	FC Sibir Novosibirsk	26	(3)

International career
2001–2002	Czech Republic U21	8	(5)
Medal record
Men's football
Representing Czech Republic
UEFA European Under-21 Championship
Winner	2002 Switzerland
- * Club domestic league appearances and goals

Martin Horák (born 16 September 1980) is a former Czech footballer. Besides the Czech Republic, he has played in Russia. Horak was part of the Czech side which won the UEFA U-21 Championships in 2002.

== Honours ==
- Russian Premier League runner-up: 2003
