= Jan Flachbart =

Czech footballer and coach (born 1978)

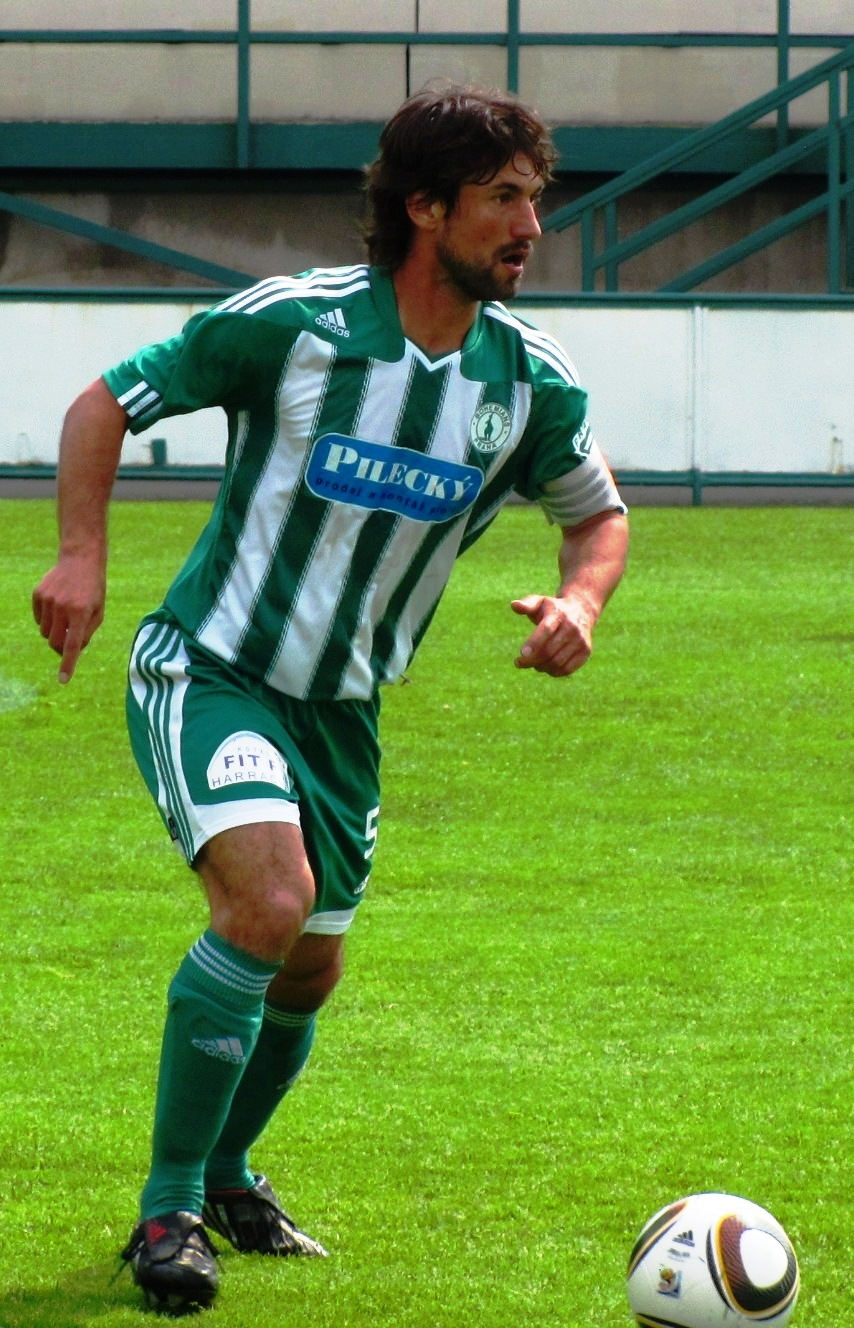

Personal information
- Date of birth: 3 March 1978 (age 48)
- Place of birth: Kolín, Czechoslovakia
- Height: 1.77 m (5 ft 9 1/2 in)
- Position: Defender

Youth career
- 1983–1991: Mogul Kolín
- 1992–1995: Mladá Boleslav
- 1995: Bohemians 1905
- 1996: Slavia Prague

Senior career*
| Years | Team | Apps | (Gls) |
| 1996 | Sokol Semice | | |
| 1996–1999 | Bohemians 1905 | 67 | (6) |
| 1999–2003 | Sparta Prague | 49 | (0) |
| 2000–2001 | → Jablonec 97 (loan) | 18 | (0) |
| 2004 | Jablonec 97 | 12 | (0) |
| 2004–2006 | Zenit St. Petersburg | 35 | (0) |
| 2006 | Sigma Olomouc | 11 | (0) |
| 2007 | Jablonec 97 | 20 | (0) |
| 2008 | Sparta Krč | 2 | (0) |
| 2008–2009 | Hlavice | 27 | (6) |
| 2010–2012 | Bohemians Prague | 40 | (7) |
| 2012–2014 | Oberlausitz Neugersdorf | 53 | (11) |
| 2014–2015 | Benátky nad Jizerou | | |
| 2015 | Sokol Nové Strašecí | | |
| 2015–2016 | SK Kosmonosy | | |
| 2017–2018 | Union Saxen | | |

International career
| 1993–1994 | Czech Republic U16 | 9 | (0) |
| 1999–2000 | Czech Republic U21 | 2 | (0) |

Managerial career
- 2018: Turnov
- * Club domestic league appearances and goals

Jan Flachbart (born 3 March 1978) is a Czech football coach and a former player.

== Career ==
Flachbart played for FC Zenit St. Petersburg in the Russian Premier League from 2004 to 2006.
