= Valeri Lebedev (footballer, born 1976) =

Russian footballer

Personal information
- Full name: Valeri Valeryevich Lebedev
- Date of birth: 17 March 1976 (age 50)
- Height: 1.79 m (5 ft 10 1/2 in)
- Position: Defender

Youth career
- FC Geolog Tyumen

Senior career*
Years	Team	Apps	(Gls)
1992–1993	FC Stroitel Tyumen		
1993–1995	FC Dynamo-Gazovik Tyumen	2	(0)
1995	→ FC Dynamo-Gazovik-d Tyumen (loan)	24	(2)
1996–1998	FC Irtysh Tobolsk	44	(1)
1998–2002	FC Tyumen	128	(3)
2003–2004	FC Irtysh Omsk	40	(1)
2005	FC Tyumen (amateur)		
2006	FC Tyumen	23	(2)
- * Club domestic league appearances and goals

Valeri Valeryevich Lebedev (Russian: Валерий Валерьевич Лебедев; born 17 March 1976) is a former Russian football player.
