= Aleksandr Burakov =

Russian footballer

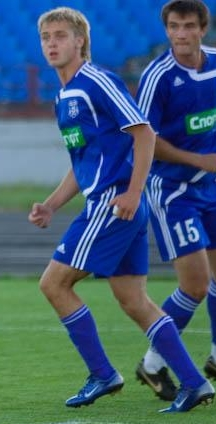

Personal information
- Full name: Aleksandr Sergeyevich Burakov
- Date of birth: 27 August 1987 (age 39)
- Place of birth: Kaluga, Russian SFSR
- Height: 1.78 m (5 ft 10 in)
- Position: Midfielder

Youth career
- 1993–1995: Olimpik Kaluga
- 1995–2000: SDYuSShOR-14 Voronezh
- 2001–2003: Akademika Moscow

Senior career*
Years	Team	Apps	(Gls)
2004–2006	FC Zenit St. Petersburg	1	(0)
2007–2010	FC Sportakademklub Moscow	51	(0)
2009	→ FC Ryazan (loan)	16	(2)
2009	→ FC Chita (loan)	8	(0)
2010	→ FC Avangard Kursk (loan)	3	(0)
2010	→ FC Fakel Voronezh (loan)	9	(0)
2011–2012	FC Fakel Voronezh	17	(0)
2013	FC Metallurg-Oskol Stary Oskol	19	(1)
2014–2015	FC Biolog-Novokubansk Progress	28	(0)
- * Club domestic league appearances and goals

Aleksandr Sergeyevich Burakov (Russian: Александр Серге́евич Бураков; born 27 August 1987) is a former Russian professional footballer.

== Club career ==
He made his debut in the Russian Premier League in 2004 for FC Zenit St. Petersburg.
