= Andrei Ushenin =

Russian footballer

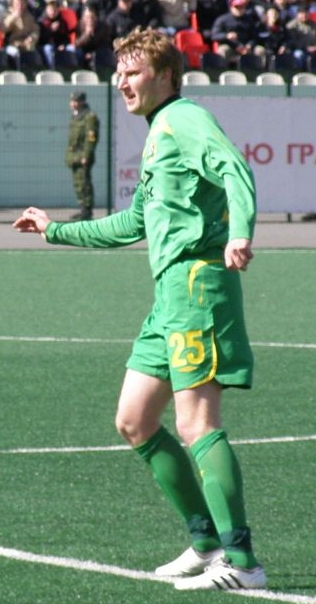

Personal information
- Full name: Andrei Valeryevich Ushenin
- Date of birth: 1 December 1983 (age 42)
- Place of birth: Maykop, Soviet Union
- Height: 1.90 m (6 ft 3 in)
- Position: Defender

Team information
- Current team: FC Druzhba Maykop (general director)

Senior career*
Years	Team	Apps	(Gls)
2002	FC Spartak Anapa	38	(4)
2003–2008	FC Kuban Krasnodar	127	(6)
2008	FC Shinnik Yaroslavl	12	(0)
2009	FC Kuban Krasnodar	19	(0)
2010	FC Baltika Kaliningrad	1	(0)
2011	FC Chernomorets Novorossiysk	27	(0)
2012	FC Luch-Energiya Vladivostok	7	(0)
2018	FC Kuban Krasnodar (amateur)		

International career
2004	Russia U-21	4	(0)

Managerial career
- 2024–: FC Druzhba Maykop (general director)
- * Club domestic league appearances and goals

Andrei Valeryevich Ushenin (Russian: Андрей Валерьевич Ушенин, born 1 December 1983) is a Russian professional football official and a former player. He is the general director of FC Druzhba Maykop.

== Playing career ==
On 3 November 2008, in a league game against FC Krylia Sovetov Samara, Shinnik goalkeeper Sergei Pesyakov was sent off with 15 minutes to go. Shinnik made all three allowed substitutions at that point, and Ushenin had to become a goalkeeper. He allowed two goals in a 0–4 loss.
