= 2007 FC Zenit Saint Petersburg season =

FC Zenit Saint Petersburg
2007–08 season
- Chairman: Aleksandr Dyukov
- Manager: Dick Advocaat
- Stadium: Petrovsky Stadium
- Premier League: 1st (winners)
- 2006–07 Russian Cup: Quarter-finals vs Spartak Moscow
- 2007–08 Russian Cup: Quarter-finals vs Tom Tomsk
- UEFA Cup: Progresses to 2008 season
- Top goalscorer: League: Pavel Pogrebnyak (11); All: Pavel Pogrebnyak (16)

The 2007 Zenit St.Petersburg season was the club's thirteenth season in the Russian Premier League, the highest tier of association football in Russia. Zenit won the Russian Premier League for the first time in their history, whilst reaching the Quarterfinal of both the 2006–07 and 2007–08 Russian Cups. In Europe, Zenit entered the UEFA Cup at the first round stage, before finishing third in their group, advancing to the Round of 32 which would take place during their 2008 season.

== Squad ==
As of match played 5 December 2007

No.	Name	Nationality	Position	Date of birth (age) (Note: Age as of the end of the season)	Signed from	Signed in	Contract ends	Apps.	Goals
Goalkeepers
1	Kamil Čontofalský	(Slovakia)	GK	3 June 1978 (aged 29)	Bohemians 1905	2003		72	0
16	Vyacheslav Malafeev	(Russia)	GK	4 March 1979 (aged 28)	Youth Team	1999		229	0
41	Mikhail Kerzhakov	(Russia)	GK	28 January 1987 (aged 20)	Youth Team	2004		0	0
90	Nikolai Zabolotny	(Russia)	GK	16 April 1990 (aged 17)	Youth Team	2007		0	0
Defenders
3	Martin Škrtel	(Slovakia)	DF	15 December 1984 (aged 22)	Trenčín	2004		113	5
4	Ivica Križanac	(Croatia)	DF	13 April 1979 (aged 28)	Dyskobolia Grodzisk Wielkopolski	2005		61	2
5	Kim Dong-jin	(South Korea)	DF	29 January 1982 (aged 25)	Seoul	2006		51	3
6	Nicolas Lombaerts	(Belgium)	DF	20 March 1985 (aged 22)	KAA Gent	2007		21	2
14	Erik Hagen	(Norway)	DF	20 July 1975 (aged 32)	Vålerenga	2005	2008	97	3
21	Sergei Gorbunov	(Russia)	DF	5 April 1987 (aged 20)	Sportakademklub Moscow	2007		0	0
22	Aleksandr Anyukov	(Russia)	DF	28 September 1982 (aged 25)	Krylia Sovetov	2005		92	4
25	Fernando Ricksen	(Netherlands)	DF	27 July 1976 (aged 31)	Rangers	2006	2009	34	2
40	Ivan Lapin	(Russia)	DF	8 May 1988 (aged 19)	Sportakademklub Moscow	2007		1	0
42	Boris Rotenberg	(Russia)	DF	19 May 1986 (aged 21)	Klubi-04	2006		0	0
55	Yan Bobrovsky	(Russia)	DF	18 September 1989 (aged 18)	Youth Team	2007		0	0
75	Yuri Lebedev	(Russia)	DF	18 September 1989 (aged 18)	Youth Team	2007		2	0
Midfielders
2	Vladislav Radimov	(Russia)	MF	26 November 1975 (aged 32)	Krylia Sovetov	2003		148	12
7	Alejandro Domínguez	(Argentina)	MF	10 June 1981 (aged 26)	Rubin Kazan	2007	2009	34	14
10	Andrey Arshavin	(Russia)	MF	29 May 1981 (aged 26)	Trainee	1999		267	62
11	Radek Šírl	(Czech Republic)	MF	20 March 1981 (aged 26)	Sparta Prague	2003		121	7
17	Lee Ho	(South Korea)	MF	22 October 1984 (aged 23)	Ulsan Hyundai	2006		23	1
18	Konstantin Zyryanov	(Russia)	MF	5 October 1977 (aged 30)	Torpedo Moscow	2007	2009	38	13
27	Igor Denisov	(Russia)	MF	17 May 1984 (aged 23)	Trainee	2002		146	23
28	Pavel Zubov	(Russia)	MF	4 February 1988 (aged 19)	Sportakademklub Moscow	2007		0	0
35	Anton Sosnin	(Russia)	MF	27 January 1990 (aged 17)	Trainee	2007		0	0
37	German Pyatnikov	(Russia)	MF	23 January 1988 (aged 19)	Youth Team	2006		0	0
44	Anatoliy Tymoshchuk	(Ukraine)	MF	30 March 1979 (aged 28)	Shakhtar Donetsk	2007		40	9
45	Yegor Okorokov	(Russia)	MF	18 April 1989 (aged 18)	Trainee	2006		1	0
50	Sergey Mironov	(Russia)	MF	13 March 1988 (aged 19)	Trainee	2005		0	0
53	Pavel Mochalin	(Russia)	MF	16 January 1989 (aged 18)	Trainee	2008		0	0
57	Aleksei Ionov	(Russia)	MF	18 February 1989 (aged 18)	Trainee	2007		2	1
77	Alexander Petrov	(Russia)	MF	20 January 1990 (aged 17)	Trainee	2007		0	0
87	Ilya Maksimov	(Russia)	MF	2 February 1987 (aged 20)	Trainee	2006		21	1
88	Oleksandr Horshkov	(Ukraine)	MF	8 February 1970 (aged 37)	Saturn-REN TV	2004			
Forwards
8	Pavel Pogrebnyak	(Russia)	FW	8 November 1983 (aged 24)	Tom Tomsk	2007		33	8
9	Fatih Tekke	(Turkey)	FW	9 September 1977 (aged 30)	Trabzonspor	2006		39	10
89	Denis Minkov	(Russia)	FW	13 May 1990 (aged 17)	Trainee	2007		0	0
Away on loan
7	Oleg Trifonov	(Russia)	MF	9 June 1981 (aged 26)	Rotor Volgograd	2005		17	1
20	Oleg Kozhanov	(Russia)	FW	5 June 1987 (aged 20)	Youth Team	2004		15	1
30	Semyon Melnikov	(Russia)	FW	27 January 1985 (aged 22)	Youth Team	2005	2009	0	0
31	Jaroslav Nesvadba	(Czech Republic)	DF	5 May 1982 (aged 25)	Jablonec	2006		1	0
32	Robertas Poškus	(Lithuania)	FW	5 May 1979 (aged 28)	Krylia Sovetov	2005		32	4
44	Alan Kasaev	(Russia)	MF	8 April 1986 (aged 21)	Shinnik Yaroslavl	2005		3	0
77	Oleg Samsonov	(Russia)	MF	7 September 1987 (aged 20)	Youth Team	2006		0	0
78	Aleksandr Panov	(Russia)	FW	21 September 1975 (aged 32)	Torpedo Moscow	2006			
Left during the season
21	Dragan Čadikovski	(North Macedonia)	FW	13 January 1982 (aged 25)	NK Celje	2005		9	1

=== Out on loan ===
Note: Flags indicate national team as defined under FIFA eligibility rules; some limited exceptions apply. Players may hold more than one non-FIFA nationality.

No.	Pos.	Nation	Player
7	MF	RUS	Oleg Trifonov (at Krylia Sovetov)
20	FW	RUS	Oleg Kozhanov (at Ural Sverdlovsk)
30	FW	RUS	Semyon Melnikov (at Luch-Energiya)
31	DF	CZE	Jaroslav Nesvadba (at Mladá Boleslav)

No.	Pos.	Nation	Player
32	FW	LTU	Robertas Poškus (at Rostov)
44	MF	RUS	Alan Kasaev (at Alania Vladikavkaz)
77	MF	RUS	Oleg Samsonov (at Spartak Nalchik)
78	FW	RUS	Aleksandr Panov (at Torpedo Moscow)

== Transfers ==
=== In ===
Date	Position	Nationality	Name	From	Fee	Ref.
18 December 2006	MF	(Argentina)	Alejandro Domínguez	Rubin Kazan	Undisclosed	
1 March 2007	MF	(Russia)	Konstantin Zyryanov	Torpedo Moscow	Undisclosed	
Winter 2007	DF	(Russia)	Sergei Gorbunov	Sportakademklub Moscow	Undisclosed	
Winter 2007	DF	(Russia)	Ivan Lapin	Sportakademklub Moscow	Undisclosed	
Winter 2007	MF	(Russia)	Pavel Zubov	Sportakademklub Moscow	Undisclosed	
Winter 2007	MF	(Ukraine)	Anatoliy Tymoshchuk	Shakhtar Donetsk	Undisclosed	
Winter 2007	FW	(Russia)	Pavel Pogrebnyak	Tom Tomsk	Undisclosed	
6 July 2007	DF	(Belgium)	Nicolas Lombaerts	Gent	Undisclosed	

=== Out ===
Date	Position	Nationality	Name	To	Fee	Ref.
28 December 2006	FW	(Russia)	Aleksandr Kerzhakov	Sevilla	Undisclosed	
20 January 2007	DF	(Czech Republic)	Pavel Mareš	Sparta Prague	Undisclosed	
Winter 2007	DF	(Czech Republic)	Jan Flachbart	Jablonec 97	Undisclosed	
Winter 2007	DF	(Russia)	Sergey Grigoryev	Zenit-2 St.Petersburg	Undisclosed	
Winter 2007	DF	(Russia)	Aleksandr Korotkov	Tekstilshchik-Telekom Ivanovo	Undisclosed	
Winter 2007	DF	(Russia)	Viktor Stroyev	Tom Tomsk	Undisclosed	
Winter 2007	DF	(Serbia)	Milan Vještica	Rostov	Undisclosed	
Winter 2007	MF	(South Korea)	Hyun Young-min	Ulsan Hyundai Horangi	Undisclosed	
Winter 2007	MF	(Russia)	Aleksandr Burakov	Sportakademklub Moscow	Undisclosed	
Winter 2007	MF	(Russia)	Aleksandr Yevstafyev	Khimki	Undisclosed	
Winter 2007	DF	(Russia)	Andrei Nagumanov	Tekstilshchik-Telekom Ivanovo	Undisclosed	
Winter 2007	FW	(Russia)	Mikhail Kozlov	Tekstilshchik-Telekom Ivanovo	Undisclosed	
Winter 2007	FW	(Russia)	Yuri Rodenkov	Spartak Nalchik	Undisclosed	
Winter 2007	FW	(Russia)	Maksim Rogov	Metallurg-Kuzbass Novokuznetsk	Undisclosed	
Summer 2007	FW	(North Macedonia)	Dragan Čadikovski	Maribor	Undisclosed	

=== Loans out ===
Date from	Position	Nationality	Name	To	Date to	Ref.
Summer 2006	DF	(Czech Republic)	Jaroslav Nesvadba	Mladá Boleslav	End of Season	
8 August 2006	FW	(North Macedonia)	Dragan Čadikovski	Publikum Celje	Summer 2007	
Summer 2006	FW	(Russia)	Oleg Kozhanov	Ural Sverdlovsk	End of Season	
Winter 2007	FW	(Lithuania)	Robertas Poškus	Rostov	End of Season	
	MF	(Russia)	Alan Kasaev	Alania Vladikavkaz		
	MF	(Russia)	Oleg Samsonov	Spartak Nalchik		
	MF	(Russia)	Oleg Trifonov	Krylia Sovetov		
	FW	(Russia)	Semyon Melnikov	Luch-Energiya Vladivostok		
	FW	(Russia)	Aleksandr Panov	Torpedo Moscow		

=== Released ===
Date	Position	Nationality	Name	Joined	Date	Ref.
Winter 2007	GK	(Russia)	Ruslan Mukhamedzyanov			
Winter 2007	MF	(Ukraine)	Oleksandr Spivak	Retired		
Winter 2007	FW	(Russia)	Yuriy Rodenkov			

== Competitions ==
=== Overall record ===
Competition	First match	Last match	Starting round	Final position	Record							
Competition	First match	Last match	Starting round	Final position	Pld	W	D	L	GF	GA	GD	Win %
Premier League	11 March 2007	11 November 2007	Matchday 1	Winners	30	18	7	5	54	32	+22	60.00
2006–07 Russian Cup	4 March 2007	18 April 2007	Round of 16	Quarterfinal	4	1	2	1	4	4	+0	25.00
2007–08 Russian Cup	27 June 2007	31 October 2007	Round of 32	Quarterfinal	3	2	1	0	13	4	+9	66.67
UEFA Cup	20 September 2007	see 2008 season	First Round	Group stage	6	2	3	1	10	7	+3	33.33
Total					43	23	13	7	81	47	+34	53.49

Last updated: 5 December 2007
Source: #Competitions

=== Premier League ===
==== Results by round ====
Round	1	2	3	4	5	6	7	8	9	10	11	12	13	14	15	16	17	18	19	20	21	22	23	24	25	26	27	28	29	30
Ground	H	A	H	A	H	A	A	H	A	H	A	H	A	H	A	H	A	H	A	H	H	A	H	A	H	A	H	A	H	A
Result	D	W	L	D	W	W	W	D	D	W	L	D	D	W	W	W	L	D	L	W	W	W	W	W	W	L	W	W	W	W

Updated to match(es) played on 11 November 2007. Source: See Results
A = Away; H = Home; W = Win; D = Draw; L = Loss

==== Results ====
11 March 2007 1	Zenit St. Petersburg	1–1	Saturn Ramenskoye	Saint Petersburg
14:00 MSK (UTC+4)	Ricksen (yellow card) 25'; Kim (yellow card) 27'; Arshavin (yellow card) 38'; Križanac (yellow card) 77'; Tekke (yellow card) 90+' (goal) 90+'	Report	Karyaka (yellow card) 29' (goal) 21' (pen.); Gogua (yellow card) 38' (yellow-red card) 48'; Lebedenko (yellow card) 45+'	Stadium: Petrovsky Stadium; Attendance: 21,000; Referee: Igor Zakharov

18 March 2007 2	Rostov	2–3	Zenit St. Petersburg	Rostov-on-Don
16:00 MSK (UTC+4)	Pjanović 62'; Kalachev (yellow card) 65'; Kanyenda 82'; Bendz (yellow card) 84'; Kruščić (yellow card) 90'	Report	Zyryanov 9'; Tymoshchuk 40'; Kim (yellow card) 43'; Arshavin 60'; Šírl (yellow card) 84'; Anyukov (yellow card) 85'	Stadium: Olimp-2; Attendance: 10,500; Referee: Yuri Baskakov

31 March 2007 3	Zenit St. Petersburg	1–3	Spartak Moscow	Saint Petersburg
14:00 MSK (UTC+4)	Tymoshchuk (yellow card) 5'; Pogrebnyak (yellow card) 13' (yellow-red card) 90' (goal) 85'; Škrtel (yellow card) 90+'	Report	Titov 2'; Rebko (yellow card) 19' (yellow-red card) 40'; Stranzl 23' (yellow card) 90+'; Bystrov 37' (pen.); Torbinski (yellow card) 40'; Șoavă (yellow card) 65'; Boyarintsev (yellow card) 81'	Stadium: Petrovsky Stadium; Attendance: 20,036; Referee: Igor Egorov

8 April 2007 4	Amkar Perm	1–1	Zenit St. Petersburg	Perm
16:00 MSK (UTC+4)	Kushev 17'; Gaál (yellow card) 18'; Savin (yellow card) 79'; Sirakov (yellow card) 86'	Report	Anyukov (yellow card) 61'; Zyryanov 66'	Stadium: Zvezda Stadium; Attendance: 19,000; Referee: Aleksei Nikolaev

14 April 2007 5	Zenit St. Petersburg	3–0	Dynamo Moscow	Saint Petersburg
14:00 MSK (UTC+4)	Hagen (yellow card) 9'; Domínguez 18'; Pogrebnyak 52' (yellow card) 54'; Denisov (yellow card) 57' (goal) 74'; Tymoshchuk (yellow card) 90'	Report	Semshov (yellow card) 21'; Tochilin (yellow card) 37'; Danny (yellow card) 51'; Tanasijević (yellow card) 54'	Stadium: Petrovsky Stadium; Attendance: 18,400; Referee: Eduard Malyi

22 April 2007 6	Luch-Energiya Vladivostok	0–1	Zenit St. Petersburg	Vladivostok
12:00 MSK (UTC+4)	Semochko (red card) 33'; Novković (yellow card) 63'	Report	Škrtel (yellow card) 58'; Hagen (yellow card) 64'; Zyryanov 81'	Stadium: Dynamo Stadium; Attendance: 10,200; Referee: Valentin Ivanov

28 April 2007 7	Tom Tomsk	0–1	Zenit St. Petersburg	Tomsk
14:00 MSK (UTC+4)	Serdyukov (yellow card) 24'; Michkov (yellow card) 57'; Yanotovsky (yellow card) 69'	Report	Ricksen (yellow card) 18'; Pogrebnyak (yellow card) 73' (goal) 76'	Stadium: Trud Stadium; Attendance: 13,000; Referee: Yuri Baskakov

6 May 2007 8	Zenit St. Petersburg	1–1	Krylia Sovetov	Saint Petersburg
14:00 MSK (UTC+4)	Malafeev (red card) 26'; Hagen (yellow card) 33'; Kim (yellow card) 62'; Pogrebnyak 68' (pen.)	Report	Trifonov (yellow card) 31' (yellow-red card) 36'; Branco 54' (yellow card) 74'; Gadzhiyev (yellow card) 81'	Stadium: Petrovsky Stadium; Attendance: 20,500; Referee: Igor Zakharov

13 May 2007 9	Kuban Krasnodar	1–1	Zenit St. Petersburg	Krasnodar
20:00 MSK (UTC+4)	Gogniyev (yellow card) 13'; Ivanov (yellow card) 15'; Laizāns 28'; Ushenin (yellow card) 39'; Zuyev (yellow card) 84'	Report	Denisov (yellow card) 15'; Pogrebnyak 43'; Križanac (yellow card) 60'	Stadium: Kuban Stadium; Attendance: 28,800; Referee: Aleksei Sergeyev

20 May 2007 10	Zenit St. Petersburg	2–1	Rubin Kazan	Saint Petersburg
14:00 MSK (UTC+4)	Kim (yellow card) 7'; Škrtel 68'; Arshavin (yellow card) 76' (goal) 78'; Ricksen (yellow card) 90+'	Report	Gabriel 41'; Jean (yellow card) 76' (yellow-red card) 90+'; Gațcan (yellow card) 89'	Stadium: Petrovsky Stadium; Attendance: 21,000; Referee: Valentin Ivanov

26 May 2007 11	CSKA Moscow	2–0	Zenit St. Petersburg	Moscow
14:00 MSK (UTC+4)	Aldonin (yellow card) 31'; Jô 60', 67'; Šemberas (yellow card) 80'	Report	Tymoshchuk (yellow card) 69'; Domínguez (yellow card) 70'; Križanac (yellow card) 81'	Stadium: Luzhniki Stadium; Attendance: 15,000; Referee: Markus Merk

10 June 2007 12	Zenit St. Petersburg	1–1	Lokomotiv Moscow	Saint Petersburg
19:00 MSK (UTC+4)	Anyukov 74'	Report	Sychev 16'; O'Connor (yellow card) 30'; Spahić (yellow card) 80'	Stadium: Petrovsky Stadium; Attendance: 21,500; Referee: Frank De Bleeckere

16 June 2007 13	Khimki	2–2	Zenit St. Petersburg	Khimki
16:00 MSK (UTC+4)	Yevstafyev (yellow card) 7'; Trivunović (yellow card) 17' (yellow-red card) 83'; Arkhipov 60'; Tikhonov (yellow card) 84'; Orlov (yellow card) 86'; Blatnjak (yellow card) 88'; Shirokov 90'	Report	Kim (yellow card) 7' (yellow-red card) 86'; Tymoshchuk 11' (pen.); Križanac (yellow card) 25'; Tekke (yellow card) 39'; Arshavin 70'; Anyukov (yellow card) 77'	Stadium: Rodina Stadium; Attendance: 8,000; Referee: Sergey Timofeev

24 June 2007 14	Zenit St. Petersburg	4–3	Spartak Nalchik	Saint Petersburg
19:00 MSK (UTC+4)	Pogrebnyak 40' (pen.) (yellow card) 64'; Arshavin 44'; Škrtel (yellow card) 64'; Radimov 86' (yellow card) 86'; Anyukov 90+'; Malafeev (yellow card) 90+'	Report	Amisulashvili 12'; Radić (yellow card) 64'; Matić (yellow card) 64'; Pylypchuk 81'; Jesus (yellow card) 83'; Uzdenov 90+'	Stadium: Petrovsky Stadium; Attendance: 20,000; Referee: Yuri Baskakov

1 July 2007 15	Moscow	0–3	Zenit St. Petersburg	Moscow
14:00 MSK (UTC+4)	Ivanov (yellow card) 7'; Adamov 50'; Barrientos (yellow card) 74'; Bystrov (yellow card) 90'	Report	Arshavin 9'; Križanac (yellow card) 34' (yellow-red card) 56'; Tymoshchuk 43'; Anyukov (yellow card) 66'; Hagen (yellow card) 74'; Ricksen (yellow card) 79'; Škrtel (yellow card) 89'; Malafeev (yellow card) 90'	Stadium: Eduard Streltsov Stadium; Attendance: 6,000; Referee: Igor Egorov
Note: Zenit were awarded a 3-0 technical win after FC Moscow fielding Roman Hubník who was ineligible.

15 July 2007 16	Zenit St. Petersburg	2–0	Rostov	Saint Petersburg
19:00 MSK (UTC+4)	Šírl (yellow card) 41'; Domínguez 45'; Radimov (yellow card) 86'; Arshavin 90'	Report	Kalachev (yellow card) 37'; Horák (yellow card) 45'; Bochkov (yellow card) 69'; Kruščić (yellow card) 90'	Stadium: Petrovsky Stadium; Attendance: 21,223; Referee: Aleksei Sergeyev

21 July 2007 17	Spartak Moscow	3–1	Zenit St. Petersburg	Moscow
14:00 MSK (UTC+4)	Mozart (yellow card) 7'; Pavlyuchenko 28', 61' (pen.) (yellow card) 84'; Torbinski (yellow card) 30'; Jiránek (yellow card) 32'; Bystrov (yellow card) 50'; Bazhenov 83'; Stranzl (yellow card) 90+'	Report	Hagen (yellow card) 6'; Arshavin 45'; Škrtel (yellow card) 57'; Malafeev (red card) 58'; Šírl (yellow card) 71'; Ricksen (yellow card) 82'; Čontofalský (yellow card) 84'; Tymoshchuk (yellow card) 84'	Stadium: Luzhniki Stadium; Attendance: 45,000; Referee: Aleksandr Gonchar

28 July 2007 18	Zenit St. Petersburg	0–0	Amkar Perm	Saint Petersburg
14:00 MSK (UTC+4)	Radimov (yellow card) 30'; Hagen (yellow card) 33'; Zyryanov (yellow card) 43'; Škrtel (yellow card) 48'; Šírl (yellow card) 49'; Pogrebnyak (yellow card) 61'; Anyukov (yellow card) 90+'	Report	Volkov (yellow card) 24'; Gaál (yellow card) 79'; Belorukov (yellow card) 80'; Levenets (yellow card) 90+'	Stadium: Petrovsky Stadium; Attendance: 20,000; Referee: Eduard Malyi

4 August 2007 19	Dynamo Moscow	4–2	Zenit St. Petersburg	Moscow
14:00 MSK (UTC+4)	Kolodin 29', 55' (pen.); Fernández (yellow card) 39'; Pimenov (yellow card) 45' (goal) 80'; Danny 65'; Granat (yellow card) 73'; D.Kombarov (yellow card) 88'	Report	Ricksen (yellow card) 10'; Domínguez (yellow card) 13'; Tymoshchuk 44' (pen.); Tekke 48'; Škrtel (yellow card) 77'; Denisov (yellow card) 88'	Stadium: Central Dynamo Stadium; Attendance: 10,500; Referee: Igor Egorov

11 August 2007 20	Zenit St. Petersburg	3–1	Luch-Energiya Vladivostok	Saint Petersburg
16:30 MSK (UTC+4)	Zyryanov 27', 77'; Arshavin 84'	Report	Kralevski (yellow card) 20'; Ajinjal (yellow card) 54'; Strelkov 59'; Semochko (yellow card) 78'	Stadium: Petrovsky Stadium; Attendance: 20,500; Referee: Aleksei Nikolaev

19 August 2007 21	Zenit St. Petersburg	2–1	Tom Tomsk	Saint Petersburg
19:30 MSK (UTC+4)	Kim 17', 38'; Pogrebnyak (yellow card) 72'	Report	Catînsus 19'; Bugayev (yellow card) 73'	Stadium: Petrovsky Stadium; Attendance: 21,100; Referee: Aleksey Kovalyov

25 August 2007 22	Krylia Sovetov	1–3	Zenit St. Petersburg	Samara
18:30 MSK (UTC+4)	Kaleshin (yellow card) 6'; Bobyor 12' (yellow card) 71'; Mujiri (yellow card) 34'; Topić (yellow card) 77'; Branco (red card) 77'	Report	Zyryanov 24'; Arshavin (yellow card) 30' (goal) 37'; Anyukov (yellow card) 35'; Kim (yellow card) 57'; Lombaerts (yellow card) 62'; Pogrebnyak 68'; Hagen (red card) 77'	Stadium: Metallurg Stadium; Attendance: 17,000; Referee: Aleksei Sergeyev

2 September 2007 23	Zenit St. Petersburg	1–0	Kuban Krasnodar	Saint Petersburg
19:00 MSK (UTC+4)	Zyryanov 77'; Anyukov (yellow card) 83'	Report	Laizāns (yellow card) 85'	Stadium: Petrovsky Stadium; Attendance: 21,500; Referee: Maksim Layushkin

23 September 2007 24	Rubin Kazan	1–4	Zenit St. Petersburg	Kazan
19:30 MSK (UTC+4)	Benachour (yellow card) 76'; Bazayev 82'	Report	Pogrebnyak 18', 57'; Zyryanov 22'; Denisov 72'	Stadium: Central Stadium; Attendance: 18,000; Referee: Yuri Baskakov

29 September 2007 25	Zenit St. Petersburg	2–1	CSKA Moscow	Saint Petersburg
14:00 MSK (UTC+4)	Lombaerts (yellow card) 20'; Pogrebnyak 33' (yellow card) 90'; Denisov 88'	Report	Šemberas (yellow card) 39'; Ignashevich (yellow card) 63'; Gusev (yellow card) 79'; Love 90'	Stadium: Petrovsky Stadium; Attendance: 22,000; Referee: Claus Bo Larsen

7 October 2007 26	Lokomotiv Moscow	1–0	Zenit St. Petersburg	Moscow
14:00 MSK (UTC+4)	Spahić (yellow card) 37' (goal) 51' (pen.); Rodolfo (yellow card) 41'; Sychev (yellow card) 68'	Report	Pogrebnyak (yellow card) 53'; Anyukov (yellow card) 87'; Šírl (yellow card) 90' (yellow-red card) 90'	Stadium: Lokomotiv Stadium; Attendance: 20,683; Referee: Igor Egorov

21 October 2007 27	Zenit St. Petersburg	4–1	Khimki	Saint Petersburg
16:00 MSK (UTC+4)	Pogrebnyak 35' (yellow card) 45+'; Zyryanov 45+'; Lombaerts 60'; Križanac (yellow card) 71'; Tekke 79'	Report	Tikhonov 20' (pen.); Blatnjak (yellow card) 39'; Shirokov (yellow card) 64'; Drozdov (yellow card) 90'	Stadium: Petrovsky Stadium; Attendance: 21,500; Referee: Maksim Layushkin

28 October 2007 28	Spartak Nalchik	0–3	Zenit St. Petersburg	Nalchik
18:30 MSK (UTC+4)	Džudović (yellow card) 44'; Yatchenko (yellow card) 66'	Report	Šírl (yellow card) 25'; Lombaerts 56'; Domínguez 67'; Tymoshchuk (yellow card) 71'; Tekke (yellow card) 75' (goal) 90+'	Stadium: Spartak Stadium; Attendance: 9,000; Referee: Eduard Malyi

3 November 2007 29	Zenit St. Petersburg	1–0	Moscow	Saint Petersburg
14:00 MSK (UTC+4)	Arshavin 20'	Report	Ivanov (yellow card) 22' (yellow-red card) 90+'; Bystrov (yellow card) 44'; López (yellow card) 72'; Moralez (yellow card) 84'	Stadium: Petrovsky Stadium; Attendance: 19,500; Referee: Aleksandr Gvardis

11 November 2007 30	Saturn Ramenskoye	0–1	Zenit St. Petersburg	Ramenskoye
14:00 MSK (UTC+4)	Evseev (yellow card) 78'; Eremenko (yellow card) 80'	Report	Šírl 14'; Tymoshchuk (yellow card) 43'; Pogrebnyak (yellow card) 59'	Stadium: Saturn Stadium; Attendance: 16,000; Referee: Yuri Baskakov

==== League table ====
Pos	Team	Pld	W	D	L	GF	GA	GD	Pts	Qualification or relegation
1	Zenit St. Petersburg (C)	30	18	7	5	54	32	+22	61	Qualification to Champions League group stage
2	Spartak Moscow	30	17	8	5	50	30	+20	59	Qualification to Champions League third qualifying round
3	CSKA Moscow	30	14	11	5	43	24	+19	53	Qualification to UEFA Cup first round (Note: Qualified as the winner of 2007–08 Russian Cup)
4	FC Moscow	30	15	7	8	40	32	+8	52	Qualification to UEFA Cup second qualifying round
5	Saturn	30	11	12	7	34	28	+6	45	Qualification to Intertoto Cup second round

Source: RFPL
Rules for classification: 1st points; 2nd matches won; 3rd goal difference; 4th head-to-head (points, matches won, goal difference, goals scored, away goals scored); 5th goals scored; 6th away goals scored; 7th drawing of lots
(C) Champions

=== Russian Cup ===
==== 2006–07 ====
4 March 2007 Sixth Round 1st Leg	Zenit St.Petersburg	1–0	Saturn Ramenskoye	Saint Petersburg
14:30 MSK (UTC+3)	Tekke 2' (yellow card) 58'; Horshkov (yellow card) 10'; Kim (yellow card) 19'; Škrtel (yellow card) 26'; Radimov (yellow card) 63'	Report	Ďurica (yellow card) 4'; Eremenko (yellow card) 30'; Kirichenko (yellow card) 53'; Igonin (yellow card) 61'; Gogua (yellow card) 68'; Pershin (yellow card) 69'; Polovinchuk (yellow card) 81'	Stadium: Petrovsky Stadium; Attendance: 19,000; Referee: Eduard Malyi

14 March 2007 Sixth Round 2nd Leg	Saturn Ramenskoye	1–1 (1–2 agg.)	Zenit St.Petersburg	Ramenskoye
19:00 MSK (UTC+3)	Vukčević (yellow card) 45'; Gyan 48'	Report	Anyukov (yellow card) 61'; Horshkov 69'	Stadium: Saturn Stadium; Attendance: 11,870; Referee: Aleksandr Gvardis

4 April 2007 Quarterfinal 1st leg	Zenit St.Petersburg	1–2	Spartak Moscow	Saint Petersburg
19:30 MSK (UTC+3)	Radimov (yellow card) 1'; Kim (yellow card) 7'; Križanac (yellow card) 27'; Pogrebnyak 71'; Domínguez (yellow card) 84'	Report	Stranzl (yellow card) 25'; Torbinski (yellow card) 33'; Mozart 45' (pen.); Dzyuba 69'; Titov (yellow card) 70'	Stadium: Petrovsky Stadium; Attendance: 18,000; Referee: Aleksandr Gvardis

18 April 2007 Quarterfinal 2nd leg	Spartak Moscow	1–1 (3–2 agg.)	Zenit St.Petersburg	Moscow
19:00 MSK (UTC+3)	Dineyev (yellow card) 14'; Prudnikov 17'	Report	Šírl (yellow card) 28'; Pogrebnyak 52'; Škrtel (yellow card) 56'; Malafeev (yellow card) 59'; Arshavin (yellow card) 60'	Stadium: Luzhniki Stadium; Attendance: 35,500; Referee: Stanislav Sukhina

==== 2007–08 ====
27 June 2007 Round of 32	Dynamo Bryansk	1–4	Zenit St.Petersburg	Bryansk
19:00 MSK (UTC+3)	Sannikov (yellow card) 19'; Alekseyev (yellow card) 40'; Malin 56' (pen.); Tolstykh (yellow card) 82'; Bouli (yellow card) 88'	Report	Domínguez 16'; Ricksen (yellow card) 20'; Šírl 43'; Tymoshchuk 45+', 90+' (pen.) (yellow card) 52'	Stadium: Dynamo Stadium; Attendance: 10,100; Referee: Aleksandr Gonchar

8 August 2007 Round of 16	Zenit St.Petersburg	9–3	Dynamo Moscow	Saint Petersburg
19:30 MSK (UTC+3)	Tymoshchuk 9' (pen.), 41' (pen.), 74'; Denisov (yellow card) 25' (yellow-red card) 45'; Arshavin (yellow card) 43' (goal) 72'; Domínguez 51' (pen.), 90+'; Zyryanov 61', 65', 80'; Anyukov (yellow card) 72'; Lombaerts (yellow card) 82'	Report	Karčemarskas (yellow card) 8'; Klimavičius (yellow card) 20' (goal) 68'; Kolodin (yellow card) 41' (yellow-red card) 78'; Fernández (red card) 45'; Tochilin (yellow card) 62'; Genkov 70'; D.Kombarov 83'	Stadium: Petrovsky Stadium; Attendance: 15,000; Referee: Aleksandr Yevstigneyev

31 October 2007 Quarterfinal	Zenit St.Petersburg	0–0 (a.e.t.) (3–4 p)	Tom Tomsk	Saint Petersburg
19:30 MSK (UTC+3)	Radimov (yellow card) 101'	Report	Yevsikov (yellow card) 50'; Bulyga (yellow card) 111'	Stadium: Petrovsky Stadium; Attendance: 11,500; Referee: Aleksei Nikolayev
	Penalties
	Radimov (penalty scored); Lebedev (penalty scored); Gorshkov (penalty scored); Ricksen (penalty missed); Čontofalský (penalty missed); Ionov (penalty missed)		(penalty missed) Michkov; (penalty scored) Skoblyakov; (penalty missed) Klimov; (penalty scored) Yevsikov; (penalty scored) Bulyga; (penalty scored) Vejić

=== UEFA Cup ===
==== 2007–08 ====
===== First round =====
20 September 2007 1st leg	Zenit St.Petersburg (Russia)	3–0	(Belgium) Standard Liège	Saint Petersburg, Russia
20:00 MSK (UTC+4)	Hagen (yellow card) 24'; Arshavin 36', 65' (yellow card) 59'; Šírl (yellow card) 81'; Kim 84'	Summary	Defour (yellow card) 36'; Tuama (yellow card) 39'; Onyewu (yellow card) 59'; Fellaini (yellow card) 67'; Dante (yellow card) 89'	Stadium: Petrovsky Stadium; Referee: David Fernández Borbalán (Spain)

4 October 2007 2nd leg	Standard Liège (Belgium)	1–1 (1–4 agg.)	(Russia) Zenit St.Petersburg	Liège, Belgium
22:00 MSK (UTC+4)	Onyewu (yellow card) 31' (yellow-red card) 39' (goal) 35'; Defour (yellow card) 41'; Camozzato (yellow card) 68'; Sarr (yellow card) 78'; Fellaini (yellow card) 88'	Summary	Pogrebnyak (yellow card) 67' (yellow-red card) 79' (goal) 79'	Stadium: Stade Maurice Dufrasne; Referee: Craig Thomson (Scotland)

===== Group stage =====
Pos	Team	Pld	W	D	L	GF	GA	GD	Pts	Qualification	EVE	NÜR	ZEN	AZ	AEL
1	(England) Everton	4	4	0	0	9	3	+6	12	Advance to knockout stage	—	—	1–0	—	3–1
2	(Germany) 1. FC Nürnberg	4	2	1	1	7	6	+1	7	Advance to knockout stage	0–2	—	—	2–1	—
3	(Russia) Zenit Saint Petersburg	4	1	2	1	6	6	0	5	Advance to knockout stage	—	2–2	—	1–1	—
4	(Netherlands) AZ	4	1	1	2	5	6	−1	4		2–3	—	—	—	1–0
5	(Greece) AEL Larissa	4	0	0	4	4	10	−6	0		—	1–3	2–3	—	—

25 October 2007 1	Zenit St.Petersburg (Russia)	1–1	(Netherlands) AZ Alkmaar	Saint Petersburg, Russia
19:30 MSK (UTC+4)	Tymoschuk 43' (pen.); Tekke (yellow card) 85'	Summary	Ari 20' (red card) 39'; Mendes (yellow card) 26'; Agustien (yellow card) 36'; Martens (yellow card) 41'; Opdam (yellow card) 42'; Koenders (yellow card) 45+1'; Jaliens (yellow card) 84'	Stadium: Petrovsky Stadium; Attendance: 20,000; Referee: Kostas Kapitanis (Cyprus)

8 November 2007 2	AEL (Greece)	2–3	(Russia) Zenit St.Petersburg	Volos, Greece
19:30 MSK (UTC+4)	Alexandrou 58'; Fotakis 62'; E.Kotsios (yellow card) 84'	Summary	Pogrebnyak 39'; Ricksen (yellow card) 55'; Zyryanov 70'; Fatih 78'	Stadium: Panthessaliko Stadium; Attendance: 14,508; Referee: Nicolai Vollquartz (Denmark)

29 November 2007 3	Zenit St.Petersburg (Russia)	2–2	(Germany) Nürnberg	Saint Petersburg, Russia
19:00 MSK (UTC+4)	Anyukov (yellow card) 24'; Škrtel (yellow card) 48'; Pogrebnyak 76'; Ionov 79'	Summary	Charisteas 25'; Beauchamp (yellow card) 45'; Benko 84'	Stadium: Petrovsky Stadium; Attendance: 21,500; Referee: Pavel Královec (Czech Republic)

5 December 2007 4	Everton (England)	1–0	(Russia) Zenit St.Petersburg	Liverpool, England
22:45 MSK (UTC+4)	Johnson (yellow card) 39'; Cahill 85'	Summary	Pogrebnyak (yellow card) 22'; Lombaerts (red card) 30'; Šírl (yellow card) 34'	Stadium: Goodison Park; Attendance: 38,407; Referee: Kristinn Jakobsson (Iceland)

== Squad statistics ==
As of match played 5 December 2007

=== Appearances and goals ===
No.	Pos	Nat	Player	Total		Premier League		2006–07 Russian Cup		2007–08 Russian Cup		UEFA Cup	
No.	Pos	Nat	Player	Apps	Goals	Apps	Goals	Apps	Goals	Apps	Goals	Apps	Goals
1	GK	(Slovakia) SVK	Kamil Čontofalský	20	0	11+2	0	1	0	1	0	5	0
2	MF	(Russia) RUS	Vladislav Radimov	25	1	12+5	1	3	0	2	0	0+3	0
3	DF	(Slovakia) SVK	Martin Škrtel	34	1	23	1	4	0	2	0	5	0
4	DF	(Croatia) CRO	Ivica Križanac	20	0	11+4	0	3+1	0	1	0	0	0
5	DF	(South Korea) KOR	Kim Dong-jin	34	3	24	2	3	0	1	0	6	1
6	DF	(Belgium) BEL	Nicolas Lombaerts	21	2	13	2	0	0	0+2	0	6	0
7	MF	(Argentina) ARG	Alejandro Domínguez	34	14	17+7	11	2	0	2	3	4+2	0
8	FW	(Russia) RUS	Pavel Pogrebnyak	33	8	17+7	3	2+2	2	0	0	5	3
9	FW	(Turkey) TUR	Fatih Tekke	23	6	11+5	4	2+1	1	2	0	1+1	1
10	MF	(Russia) RUS	Andrey Arshavin	41	12	30	9	3	0	2	1	6	2
11	MF	(Czech Republic) CZE	Radek Šírl	32	2	19+3	1	2	0	2	1	6	0
14	DF	(Norway) NOR	Erik Hagen	22	0	13+2	0	2	0	3	0	1+1	0
16	GK	(Russia) RUS	Vyacheslav Malafeev	25	0	19	0	3	0	2	0	1	0
17	MF	(South Korea) KOR	Lee Ho	5	0	0	0	1+2	0	1	0	0+1	0
18	MF	(Russia) RUS	Konstantin Zyryanov	38	13	24+3	9	1+2	0	0+2	3	6	1
22	DF	(Russia) RUS	Aleksandr Anyukov	34	2	21+1	2	3	0	3	0	6	0
25	MF	(Netherlands) NED	Fernando Ricksen	19	0	12+2	0	1+1	0	2	0	1	0
27	MF	(Russia) RUS	Igor Denisov	30	3	14+11	3	1+1	0	1+1	0	1	0
40	DF	(Russia) RUS	Ivan Lapin	1	0	0	0	0	0	1	0	0	0
44	MF	(Ukraine) UKR	Anatoliy Tymoshchuk	40	9	29	3	3	0	2	5	6	1
45	MF	(Russia) RUS	Yegor Okorokov	1	0	0	0	0	0	1	0	0	0
57	MF	(Russia) RUS	Aleksei Ionov	2	1	0	0	0	0	1	0	0+1	1
75	DF	(Russia) RUS	Yuri Lebedev	2	0	1	0	0	0	0+1	0	0	0
87	MF	(Russia) RUS	Ilya Maksimov	12	0	0+6	0	1+1	0	1+1	0	0+2	0
88	MF	(Ukraine) UKR	Oleksandr Horshkov	17	1	9+2	0	3	1	1+1	0	0+1	0
Players away from the club on loan:
Players who left Zenit St.Petersburg during the season:

=== Goal scorers ===
Place	Position	Nation	Number	Name	Premier League	2006–07 Russian Cup	2007–08 Russian Cup	UEFA Cup	Total
1	FW	(Russia)	8	Pavel Pogrebnyak	11	2	0	3	16
2	MF	(Russia)	18	Konstantin Zyryanov	9	0	3	1	13
3	FW	(Russia)	10	Andrey Arshavin	9	0	1	2	12
4	MF	(Ukraine)	44	Anatoliy Tymoshchuk	3	0	5	1	9
5	FW	(Turkey)	9	Fatih Tekke	4	1	0	1	6
5	MF	(Argentina)	7	Alejandro Domínguez	3	0	3	0	6
7	MF	(Russia)	27	Igor Denisov	3	0	0	0	3
7	DF	(South Korea)	5	Kim Dong-jin	2	0	0	1	3
9	DF	(Belgium)	6	Nicolas Lombaerts	2	0	0	0	2
9	DF	(Russia)	22	Aleksandr Anyukov	2	0	0	0	2
9	MF	(Czech Republic)	11	Radek Šírl	1	0	1	0	2
12	DF	(Slovakia)	3	Martin Škrtel	1	0	0	0	1
12	MF	(Russia)	2	Vladislav Radimov	1	0	0	0	1
12	MF	(Ukraine)	88	Oleksandr Horshkov	0	1	0	0	1
12	MF	(Russia)	57	Aleksei Ionov	0	0	0	1	1
				Awarded	3	0	0	0	3
				TOTALS	54	4	13	10	81

=== Clean sheets ===
Place	Position	Nation	Number	Name	Premier League	06/07 Russian Cup	07/08 Russian Cup	UEFA Cup	Total
1	GK	(Russia)	16	Vyacheslav Malafeev	7	1	0	0	8
2	GK	(Czech Republic)	1	Kamil Čontofalský	2	0	1	1	4
				TOTALS	10	2	0	2	14

=== Disciplinary record ===
Number	Nation	Position	Name	Premier League		2006–07 Russian Cup		2007–08 Russian Cup		UEFA Cup		Total	
Number	Nation	Position	Name	Booked	Sent off (straight red)	Booked	Sent off (straight red)	Booked	Sent off (straight red)	Booked	Sent off (straight red)	Booked	Sent off (straight red)
1	(Czech Republic)	GK	Kamil Čontofalský	1	0	0	0	0	0	0	0	1	0
2	(Russia)	MF	Vladislav Radimov	3	0	2	0	1	0	0	0	6	0
3	(Slovakia)	DF	Martin Škrtel	7	0	2	0	0	0	1	0	10	0
4	(Croatia)	DF	Ivica Križanac	7	1	1	0	0	0	0	0	8	1
5	(South Korea)	DF	Kim Dong-jin	7	1	2	0	0	0	0	0	9	1
6	(Belgium)	DF	Nicolas Lombaerts	2	0	0	0	1	0	0	1	3	1
7	(Argentina)	MF	Alejandro Domínguez	2	0	1	0	0	0	0	0	3	0
8	(Russia)	FW	Pavel Pogrebnyak	11	1	0	0	0	0	3	1	14	2
9	(Turkey)	FW	Fatih Tekke	3	0	1	0	0	0	1	0	5	0
10	(Russia)	MF	Andrey Arshavin	3	0	1	0	1	0	1	0	6	0
11	(Czech Republic)	MF	Radek Šírl	7	1	1	0	0	0	2	0	10	1
14	(Norway)	DF	Erik Hagen	6	1	0	0	0	0	1	0	7	1
16	(Russia)	GK	Vyacheslav Malafeev	2	2	1	0	0	0	0	0	3	2
18	(Russia)	MF	Konstantin Zyryanov	1	0	0	0	0	0	0	0	1	0
22	(Russia)	DF	Aleksandr Anyukov	8	0	1	0	1	0	1	0	11	0
25	(Netherlands)	MF	Fernando Ricksen	6	0	0	0	1	0	1	0	8	0
27	(Russia)	MF	Igor Denisov	3	0	0	0	2	1	0	0	5	1
44	(Ukraine)	MF	Anatoliy Tymoshchuk	6	0	0	0	1	0	0	0	7	0
88	(Ukraine)	MF	Oleksandr Horshkov	0	0	0	0	1	0	0	0	1	0
			TOTALS	85	7	13	0	8	1	11	2	117	10
