= 2008 FC Zenit Saint Petersburg season =

FC Zenit Saint Petersburg
2008-09 season
- Chairman: Aleksandr Dyukov
- Manager: Dick Advocaat
- Stadium: Petrovsky Stadium
- Premier League: 5th
- 08–09 Russian Cup: Fifth round vs Sibir Novosibirsk
- Russian Super Cup: Winners
- 2007–08 UEFA Cup: Winners
- UEFA Super Cup: Winners
- 2008–09 UEFA Champions League: Group stage
- Top goalscorer: League: Fatih Tekke (8); All: Pavel Pogrebnyak (16)

The 2008 Zenit St.Petersburg season was the club's fourteenth season in the Russian Premier League, the highest tier of association football in Russia. Domestically, Zenit finished fifth in the Russian Premier League, reached the Fifth round of the 2008–09 Russian Cup and won the Russian Super Cup. In Europe, Zenit won the 2007–08 UEFA Cup and the 2008 UEFA Super Cup before finishing third in their Champions League group.

== Squad ==
As of match played 10 December 2008

No.	Name	Nationality	Position	Date of birth (age) (Note: Age as of the end of the season)	Signed from	Signed in	Contract ends	Apps.	Goals
Goalkeepers
1	Kamil Čontofalský	(Slovakia)	GK	3 June 1978 (aged 30)	Bohemians 1905	2003		72	0
16	Vyacheslav Malafeev	(Russia)	GK	4 March 1979 (aged 29)	Trainee	1999		277	0
51	Vladimir Mukhin	(Russia)	GK	30 October 1990 (aged 18)	DYuSSh Smena-Zenit	2008		0	0
90	Nikolai Zabolotny	(Russia)	GK	16 April 1990 (aged 18)	Trainee	2007		0	0
91	Andrei Zaytsev	(Russia)	GK	14 January 1991 (aged 17)	DYuSSh Smena-Zenit	2008		0	0
Defenders
4	Ivica Križanac	(Croatia)	DF	13 April 1979 (aged 29)	Dyskobolia Grodzisk Wielkopolski	2005		102	3
5	Kim Dong-jin	(South Korea)	DF	29 January 1982 (aged 26)	Seoul	2006		65	3
6	Nicolas Lombaerts	(Belgium)	DF	20 March 1985 (aged 23)	KAA Gent	2007		26	2
14	Tomáš Hubočan	(Slovakia)	DF	17 September 1985 (aged 23)	MŠK Žilina	2008		15	0
22	Aleksandr Anyukov	(Russia)	DF	28 September 1982 (aged 26)	Krylia Sovetov	2005		134	8
25	Fernando Ricksen	(Netherlands)	DF	27 July 1976 (aged 32)	Rangers	2015		45	2
26	Mikhail Smirnov	(Russia)	DF	3 June 1990 (aged 18)	Trainee	2006		0	0
28	Sébastien Puygrenier	(France)	DF	28 January 1982 (aged 26)	Nancy	2008		14	1
32	Artyom Kulesha	(Russia)	DF	14 January 1990 (aged 18)	Trainee	2007		0	0
34	Aleksandr Khokhlov	(Russia)	DF	30 September 1988 (aged 20)	Trainee	2006		1	0
40	Ivan Lapin	(Russia)	DF	8 May 1988 (aged 20)	Sportakademklub Moscow	2007		1	0
43	Yuriy Vorobyov	(Russia)	DF	6 March 1990 (aged 18)	DYuSSh Smena-Zenit	2008		0	0
50	Igor Cheminava	(Russia)	DF	23 March 1991 (aged 17)	DYuSSh Smena-Zenit	2008		0	0
55	Yan Bobrovsky	(Russia)	DF	18 September 1989 (aged 19)	Trainee	2007		0	0
65	Yuriy Boyev	(Russia)	DF	16 January 1991 (aged 17)	DYuSSh Smena-Zenit	2008		0	0
Midfielders
2	Vladislav Radimov	(Russia)	MF	26 November 1975 (aged 33)	Krylia Sovetov	2003		155	12
7	Alejandro Domínguez	(Argentina)	MF	10 June 1981 (aged 27)	Rubin Kazan	2007		62	18
10	Andrey Arshavin	(Russia)	MF	29 May 1981 (aged 27)	Trainee	1999		310	71
11	Radek Šírl	(Czech Republic)	MF	20 March 1981 (aged 27)	Sparta Prague	2003		162	7
15	Roman Shirokov	(Russia)	MF	6 July 1981 (aged 27)	Khimki	2008		39	3
17	Lee Ho	(South Korea)	MF	22 October 1984 (aged 24)	Ulsan Hyundai	2006		26	1
18	Konstantin Zyryanov	(Russia)	MF	5 October 1977 (aged 31)	Torpedo Moscow	2007		84	22
19	Danny	(Portugal)	MF	7 August 1983 (aged 25)	Dynamo Moscow	2008		17	8
20	Viktor Fayzulin	(Russia)	MF	22 April 1986 (aged 22)	Spartak Nalchik	2008		37	7
27	Igor Denisov	(Russia)	MF	17 May 1984 (aged 24)	Trainee	2002		190	26
28	Pavel Zubov	(Russia)	MF	4 February 1988 (aged 20)	Sportakademklub Moscow	2007		0	0
30	Pavel Komolov	(Russia)	MF	10 March 1989 (aged 19)	DYuSSh Smena-Zenit	2006		0	0
35	Anton Sosnin	(Russia)	MF	27 January 1990 (aged 18)	Trainee	2007		0	0
37	German Pyatnikov	(Russia)	MF	23 January 1988 (aged 20)	Trainee	2006		0	0
44	Anatoliy Tymoshchuk	(Ukraine)	MF	30 March 1979 (aged 29)	Shakhtar Donetsk	2007		84	15
45	Yegor Okorokov	(Russia)	MF	18 April 1989 (aged 19)	Trainee	2006		0	0
47	Basel Abdoulfattakh	(Russia)	MF	6 March 1990 (aged 18)	DYuSSh Smena-Zenit	2008		0	0
48	Nikita Kolesnikov	(Russia)	MF	12 August 1988 (aged 20)	Trainee	2007		0	0
53	Pavel Mochalin	(Russia)	MF	16 January 1989 (aged 19)	DYuSSh Smena-Zenit	2008		0	0
57	Aleksei Ionov	(Russia)	MF	18 February 1989 (aged 19)	Trainee	2007		9	1
59	Sergey Vasetsky	(Russia)	MF	17 January 1990 (aged 18)	DYuSSh Smena-Zenit	2008		0	0
75	Ilya Sagdatullin	(Russia)	MF	27 February 1991 (aged 17)	Trainee	2007		0	0
77	Alexander Petrov	(Russia)	MF	20 January 1990 (aged 18)	Trainee	2007		0	0
88	Oleksandr Horshkov	(Ukraine)	MF	8 February 1970 (aged 38)	Saturn-REN TV	2004			
96	Roland Gigolayev	(Russia)	MF	4 January 1990 (aged 18)	Yunost Vladikavkaz	2005		0	0
98	Sergei Petrov	(Russia)	MF	2 January 1991 (aged 17)	DYuSSh Smena-Zenit	2008		0	0
Forwards
8	Pavel Pogrebnyak	(Russia)	FW	8 November 1983 (aged 25)	Tom Tomsk	2007		67	24
9	Fatih Tekke	(Turkey)	FW	9 September 1977 (aged 31)	Trabzonspor	2006		67	19
31	Vitali Galysh	(Russia)	FW	13 May 1990 (aged 18)	DYuSSh Smena-Zenit	2008		0	0
33	Pavel Ignatovich	(Russia)	FW	24 May 1989 (aged 19)	Trainee	2007		0	0
36	Stanislav Matyash	(Russia)	FW	23 April 1991 (aged 17)	Trainee	2007		0	0
38	Yevgeni Izvekov	(Russia)	FW	24 June 1988 (aged 20)	DYuSSh Smena-Zenit	2008		0	0
42	Andrei Ornat	(Russia)	FW	4 March 1991 (aged 17)	Trainee	2007		0	0
89	Dmitri Nechayev	(Russia)	FW	16 June 1990 (aged 18)	DYuSSh Smena-Zenit	2008		0	0
Out on loan
21	Sergei Gorbunov	(Russia)	DF	5 April 1987 (aged 21)	Sportakademklub Moscow	2007		0	0
41	Mikhail Kerzhakov	(Russia)	GK	28 January 1987 (aged 21)	Youth Team	2004		0	0
42	Boris Rotenberg	(Russia)	DF	19 May 1986 (aged 22)	Klubi-04	2006		0	0
50	Sergey Mironov	(Russia)	FW	13 March 1988 (aged 20)	Trainee	2005		0	0
87	Ilya Maksimov	(Russia)	MF	2 February 1987 (aged 21)	Trainee	2006		21	1
Left during the season
49	Pavel Teteryukov	(Russia)	FW	22 June 1990 (aged 18)	DYuSSh Smena-Zenit	2008		0	0

=== Out on loan ===
Note: Flags indicate national team as defined under FIFA eligibility rules; some limited exceptions apply. Players may hold more than one non-FIFA nationality.

No.	Pos.	Nation	Player
21	DF	RUS	Sergei Gorbunov (at Mashuk-KMV Pyatigorsk)
41	GK	RUS	Mikhail Kerzhakov (at Volga Ulyanovsk)
42	DF	RUS	Boris Rotenberg (at Saturn Ramenskoye)

No.	Pos.	Nation	Player
50	MF	RUS	Sergey Mironov (at Sliven)
87	MF	RUS	Ilya Maksimov (at Sportakademklub Moscow)

== Transfers ==
=== In ===
Date	Position	Nationality	Name	From	Fee	Ref.
Winter 2007	DF	(Slovakia)	Tomáš Hubočan	MŠK Žilina	Undisclosed	
Winter 2007	MF	(Russia)	Viktor Fayzulin	Spartak Nalchik	Undisclosed	
Winter 2007	MF	(Russia)	Roman Shirokov	Khimki	Undisclosed	
Summer 2007	DF	(France)	Sébastien Puygrenier	Nancy	Undisclosed	
Summer 2007	MF	(Portugal)	Danny	Dynamo Moscow	Undisclosed	

=== Out ===
Date	Position	Nationality	Name	To	Fee	Ref.
Winter 2008	DF	(Slovakia)	Martin Škrtel	Liverpool	Undisclosed	
Summer 2008	FW	(Russia)	Pavel Teteryukov	Dmitrov	Undisclosed	

=== Loans out ===
Date from	Position	Nationality	Name	To	Date to	Ref.
Winter 2008	DF	(Norway)	Erik Hagen	Wigan Athletic	Summer 2008	
Winter 2008	DF	(Russia)	Sergei Gorbunov	Sportakademklub Moscow	Summer 2008	
Winter 2008	DF	(Russia)	Boris Rotenberg	Shinnik Yaroslavl	Summer 2008	
Winter 2008	DF	(Russia)	Yuri Lebedev	Nosta Novotroitsk	Summer 2008	
Winter 2008	MF	(Russia)	Ilya Maksimov	Shinnik Yaroslavl	Summer 2008	
Winter 2008	MF	(Russia)	Sergey Mironov	TP-47	Summer 2008	
Summer 2008	GK	(Russia)	Mikhail Kerzhakov	Volga Ulyanovsk	Winter 2009	
Summer 2008	DF	(Norway)	Erik Hagen	Vålerenga	Winter 2009	
Summer 2008	DF	(Russia)	Sergei Gorbunov	Mashuk-KMV Pyatigorsk	Winter 2009	
Summer 2008	DF	(Russia)	Boris Rotenberg	Saturn	Winter 2009	
Summer 2008	MF	(Russia)	Sergey Mironov	Sliven	Winter 2009	
Summer 2008	MF	(Russia)	Ilya Maksimov	Sportakademklub Moscow	Winter 2009	

=== Released ===
Date	Position	Nationality	Name	Joined	Date	Ref.
Winter 2009	DF	(Russia)	Mikhail Smirnov	Amkar Perm		
Winter 2009	MF	(Russia)	Vladislav Radimov	Retired		
Winter 2009	MF	(Ukraine)	Oleksandr Horshkov	Retired		

== Friendlies ==
19 January 2008	Zenit St. Petersburg (Russia)	1–1	(Uzbekistan) Neftchi Fargʻona	Dubai, United Arab Emirates
MSK (UTC+4)	Pogrebnyak 75' (pen.)	[ Report]

24 January 2008	Zenit St. Petersburg (Russia)	2–0	(Bulgaria) Litex Lovech	Dubai, United Arab Emirates
MSK (UTC+4)	Pogrebnyak 79', 86'	[ Report]

27 January 2008	Zenit St. Petersburg (Russia)	1–0	(Czech Republic) Slavia Prague	Dubai, United Arab Emirates
MSK (UTC+4)	Zyryanov 43'	[ Report]

30 January 2008	Zenit St. Petersburg (Russia)	3–0	(Zambia) ZESCO United	Dubai, United Arab Emirates
MSK (UTC+4)	Pogrebnyak 2', 42'; Zyryanov 90'	[ Report]

6 February 2008	Málaga (Spain)	2–1	(Russia) Zenit St. Petersburg	Málaga, Spain
MSK (UTC+4)		[ Report]	Kim 63'	Stadium: La Rosaleda Stadium

9 February 2008	Zenit St. Petersburg (Russia)	2–2	(Ukraine) Dynamo Kyiv	Saint Petersburg, Russia
MSK (UTC+4)	Pogrebnyak 41'; Fayzulin 47'	[ Report]		Stadium: Petrovsky Stadium

23 February 2008	Noordwijk (Netherlands)	0–2	(Russia) Zenit St. Petersburg	Noordwijk, Netherlands
MSK (UTC+4)		[ Report]	Tymoschuk 14'; Radimov 38'	Stadium: Sportpark Duinwetering

26 February 2008	ADO Den Haag (Netherlands)	0–1	(Russia) Zenit St. Petersburg	The Hague, Netherlands
MSK (UTC+4)		[ Report]	Tymoshchuk 4'	Stadium: Kyocera Stadion

22 June 2008	Helsingborg (Sweden)	0–1	(Russia) Zenit St. Petersburg	Helsingborg, Sweden
MSK (UTC+4)		[ Report]	Denisov 50'	Stadium: Olympia

25 June 2008	Nordsjælland (Denmark)	1–5	(Russia) Zenit St. Petersburg	Farum, Denmark
MSK (UTC+4)		[ Report]	Fayzulin 9', 42', 66', 72'; Tekke 30'	Stadium: Farum Park

28 June 2008	Copenhagen (Denmark)	2–0	(Russia) Zenit St. Petersburg	Copenhagen, Denmark
MSK (UTC+4)		[ Report]		Stadium: Parken Stadium

== Competitions ==
=== Overall record ===
Competition	First match	Last match	Starting round	Final position	Record							
Competition	First match	Last match	Starting round	Final position	Pld	W	D	L	GF	GA	GD	Win %
Premier League	16 March 2008	22 November 2008	Matchday 1	5th	30	12	12	6	59	37	+22	40.00
Russian Cup	6 August 2008	6 August 2008	Fifth round	Fifth round	1	0	0	1	0	1	−1	0.00
Russian Super Cup	9 March 2008	9 March 2008	Final	Winners	1	1	0	0	2	1	+1	100.00
UEFA Cup	13 February 2008	14 May 2008	Round of 32	Winners	9	5	1	3	16	8	+8	55.56
UEFA Super Cup	29 August 2008	29 August 2008	Final	Winners	1	1	0	0	2	1	+1	100.00
UEFA Champions League	17 September 2008	10 December 2008	Group stage	Group stage	6	1	2	3	4	7	−3	16.67
Total					48	20	15	13	83	55	+28	41.67

Last updated: 10 December 2008
Source: Competitions

=== Russian Super Cup ===
9 March 2008	Zenit St.Petersburg	2–1	Lokomotiv Moscow	Moscow
16:00 MSK (UTC+4)	Arshavin 34' (yellow card) 69'; Zyryanov (yellow card) 55'; Križanac (yellow card) 68' (yellow-red card) 90+'; Radimov (red card) 79'; Hubočan (yellow card) 81'; Pogrebnyak 82'	[ Report]	Gurenko (yellow card) 53'; Rodolfo 69' (yellow card) 90+'; Torbinski (yellow card) 73' (yellow-red card) 79'	Stadium: Luzhniki Stadium; Attendance: 48,000; Referee: Yuri Baskakov

=== UEFA Super Cup ===
29 August 2008	Manchester United (England)	1–2	(Russia) Zenit St.Petersburg	Fontvieille, Monaco
22:45 MSK (UTC+4)	Scholes (yellow card) 45+1' (yellow-red card) 90'; Anderson (yellow card) 54'; Vidić 73'; Tevez (yellow card) 74'	Report	Pogrebnyak 44'; Danny 59'	Stadium: Stade Louis II; Attendance: 18,064; Referee: Claus Bo Larsen (Denmark)

=== Premier League ===
==== Results by round ====
Round	1	2	3	4	5	6	7	8	9	10	11	12	13	14	15	16	17	18	19	20	21	22	23	24	25	26	27	28	29	30
Ground	H	A	H	A	H	A	H	A	H	A	H	H	A	H	A	H	A	H	A	H	A	H	A	H	A	A	H	A	H	A
Result	D	W	L	D	D	D	W	D	D	D	L	W	W	W	L	W	L	L	W	D	W	L	W	W	D	D	W	D	D	W

Updated to match(es) played on 22 November 2008. Source: See Results
A = Away; H = Home; W = Win; D = Draw; L = Loss

==== Results ====
16 March 2008 1	Zenit St. Petersburg	0–0	Spartak Moscow	Saint Petersburg
16:00 MSK (UTC+4)	Pogrebnyak (yellow card) 22'; Šírl (yellow card) 27'; Fayzulin (yellow card) 62'	Summary	Mozart (yellow card) 7'; Stranzl (yellow card) 24'; Covalciuc (yellow card) 38'	Stadium: Petrovsky Stadium; Attendance: 22,500; Referee: Aleksandr Gvardis

23 March 2008 2	Moscow	0–2	Zenit St. Petersburg	Moscow
16:00 MSK (UTC+4)	Kuzmin (yellow card) 2'; Rebeja (yellow card) 16'; Epureanu (yellow card) 48'; Barrientos (yellow card) 90'	Summary	Arshavin 3'; Šírl (yellow card) 38'; Anyukov 60'; Tekke (yellow card) 78'	Stadium: Eduard Streltsov Stadium; Attendance: 8,000; Referee: Stanislav Sukhina

2 July 2008 3	Zenit St. Petersburg	1–3	Rubin Kazan	Saint Petersburg
18:00 MSK (UTC+4)	Fayzulin (yellow card) 3'; Arshavin 16'; Križanac (yellow card) 35'	Summary	Kobenko (yellow card) 12'; Semak 76'; Karadeniz 77', 84'	Stadium: Petrovsky Stadium; Attendance: 21,470; Referee: Igor Zakharov

8 July 2008 4	Shinnik Yaroslavl	2–2	Zenit St. Petersburg	Yaroslavl
16:30 MSK (UTC+4)	Bochkov (yellow card) 3'; Khazov (yellow card) 39'; Boyarintsev (yellow card) 43' (goal) 90+'; Laizāns (yellow card) 45+'; Buznikin 70' (pen.)	Summary	Hubočan (yellow card) 16'; Pogrebnyak 42'; Tymoshchuk 44' (pen.)	Stadium: Shinnik Stadium; Attendance: 19,600; Referee: Almir Kayumov

12 July 2008 5	Zenit St. Petersburg	1–1	Krylia Sovetov	Saint Petersburg
14:00 MSK (UTC+4)	Anyukov 13'; Križanac (yellow card) 69'	Summary	Taranov 27'; Oh (yellow card) 29'; Savin (yellow card) 59'; Ivanov (yellow card) 63'; Salugin (yellow card) 74'; Leilton (yellow card) 79'; Kowba (yellow card) 90+'	Stadium: Petrovsky Stadium; Attendance: 20,000; Referee: Aleksei Nikolaev

16 July 2008 6	Saturn Ramenskoye	1–1	Zenit St. Petersburg	Ramenskoye
18:00 MSK (UTC+4)	Zelão 40' (yellow card) 90'; Igonin (yellow card) 67'	Summary	Ricksen (yellow card) 17'; Arshavin (yellow card) 51'; Shirokov (yellow card) 57' (goal) 86'; Hubočan (yellow card) 69'; Pogrebnyak (yellow card) 76'; Denisov (yellow card) 77'	Stadium: Saturn Stadium; Attendance: 14,000; Referee: Maksim Layushkin

20 July 2008 7	Zenit St. Petersburg	3–1	Terek Grozny	Saint Petersburg
MSK (UTC+4)	Zabavník 17' (o.g.); Zyryanov 38'; Tekke 53'	Summary	Pancu 47'; Zabavník (yellow card) 83'	Stadium: Petrovsky Stadium; Attendance: 18,000; Referee: Sergei Karasev

30 July 2008 8	CSKA Moscow	0–0	Zenit St. Petersburg	Moscow
MSK (UTC+4)	Erkin (yellow card) 21'; Dzagoev (yellow card) 31' (yellow-red card) 78'; Dudu (yellow card) 45+'; Krasić (yellow card) 49'; Akinfeev (yellow card) 57'; Rahimić (yellow card) 70'	Summary	Križanac (yellow card) 45+' (yellow-red card) 49'	Stadium: Luzhniki Stadium; Attendance: 16,000; Referee: Igor Egorov

7 May 2008 9	Zenit St. Petersburg	1–1	Lokomotiv Moscow	Saint Petersburg
MSK (UTC+4)	Arshavin (yellow card) 51'; Domínguez 52' (yellow card) 88'	Summary	Cociș (yellow card) 39'; Glushakov (yellow card) 44'; Torbinski 61'; Gurenko (yellow card) 77'	Stadium: Petrovsky Stadium; Attendance: 21,000

11 May 2008 10	Luch-Energiya Vladivostok	0–0	Zenit St. Petersburg	Vladivostok
MSK (UTC+4)		Summary		Stadium: Dynamo Stadium; Attendance: 6,500; Referee: Vitali Doroshenko

16 May 2008 11	Zenit St. Petersburg	3–4	Spartak Nalchik	Saint Petersburg
MSK (UTC+4)	Amisulashvili 11' (o.g.); Zyryanov 25'; Tekke 49' (yellow card) 77'; Tymoshchuk (yellow card) 55'; Anyukov (yellow card) 80'	Summary	Anyukov 19' (o.g.); Kalimullin 20' (yellow card) 86'; Geteriev (yellow card) 40'; Džudović 58'; Amisulashvili 69'; Yatchenko (yellow card) 71'; Kisenkov (yellow card) 81'; Dzakhmishev (yellow card) 90+'	Stadium: Petrovsky Stadium; Attendance: 21,000; Referee: Aleksandr Gvardis

6 July 2008 12	Zenit St. Petersburg	5–1	Tom Tomsk	Saint Petersburg
18:00 MSK (UTC+4)	Fayzulin 6', 34'; Shirokov 11' (yellow card) 61'; Križanac (yellow card) 21' (yellow-red card) 64'; Tymoshchuk 23', 27' (pen.); Tekke (yellow card) 41'; Kim (yellow card) 82'	Summary	Michkov 22' (pen.); Catînsus (yellow card) 23' (yellow-red card) 77'; Shirko (yellow card) 47'; Radosavljević (yellow card) 66'; Klimov (yellow card) 85'	Stadium: Petrovsky Stadium; Attendance: 21,500; Referee: Igor Zakharov

11 July 2008 13	Khimki	1–4	Zenit St. Petersburg	Khimki
MSK (UTC+4)	Trivunović (yellow card) 18' (yellow-red card) 84'; Dineyev (yellow card) 32'; Șoavă (yellow card) 68'; Blatnjak 81'; Sabitov (yellow card) 87'	Summary	Zyryanov 27'; Anyukov 31'; Tekke (yellow card) 53'; Fayzulin 20'; Arshavin 90+'	Stadium: Rodina Stadium; Attendance: 9,300; Referee: Almir Kayumov

19 July 2008 14	Zenit St. Petersburg	2–0	Amkar Perm	Saint Petersburg
20:00 MSK (UTC+4)	Arshavin (yellow card) 12'; Zyryanov 30'; Tymoshchuk 51' (pen.)	Summary	Dujmović (yellow card) 11'; Gaál (yellow card) 48'; Popov (yellow card) 50'; Belorukov (yellow card) 55'	Stadium: Petrovsky Stadium; Attendance: 21,200; Referee: Yuri Baskakov

26 July 2008 15	Dynamo Moscow	1–0	Zenit St. Petersburg	Moscow
16:00 MSK (UTC+4)	Tanasijević (yellow card) 17'; K.Kombarov (yellow card) 41' (goal) 88'	Summary	Tekke (yellow card) 29' (yellow-red card) 36'; Zyryanov (yellow card) 43'; Domínguez (yellow card) 55'; Shirokov (yellow card) 59'	Stadium: Central Dynamo Stadium; Attendance: 15,000; Referee: Aleksei Kovalyov

2 August 2008 16	Zenit St. Petersburg	2–1	Moscow	Saint Petersburg
16:00 MSK (UTC+4)	Šírl (yellow card) 32'; Denisov 51' (yellow card) 60'; Tekke 77' (yellow card) 77'	Summary	Rebko 22'; Kuzmin (yellow card) 58'	Stadium: Petrovsky Stadium; Attendance: 21,000; Referee: Vitali Doroshenko

10 August 2008 17	Rubin Kazan	4–1	Zenit St. Petersburg	Kazan
19:00 MSK (UTC+4)	Bukharov 9', 11'; Rebrov 12'; Karadeniz (yellow card) 21'; Kobenko 86'	Summary	Tymoshchuk (yellow card) 15' (yellow-red card) 90' (goal) 23' (pen.); Križanac (yellow card) 55'; Puygrenier (red card) 76'	Stadium: Central Stadium; Attendance: 24,000; Referee: Maksim Layushkin

17 August 2008 18	Zenit St. Petersburg	1–3	Shinnik Yaroslavl	Saint Petersburg
20:00 MSK (UTC+4)	Zyryanov 25'	Summary	Bochkov (yellow card) 20'; Buznikin 52'; Silva 57'; Olexici 72'; Kudryashov (yellow card) 79'	Stadium: Petrovsky Stadium; Attendance: 22,500; Referee: Aleksei Nikolaev

24 August 2008 19	Krylia Sovetov	0–3	Zenit St. Petersburg	Samara
15:00 MSK (UTC+4)	Booth (yellow card) 32'; Kowba (yellow card) 88'; Koller (yellow card) 90'	Summary	Pogrebnyak 16', 75' (pen.); Puygrenier (yellow card) 22'; Tymoshchuk (yellow card) 54'; Zyryanov 61'; Šírl (yellow card) 63'	Stadium: Metallurg Stadium; Attendance: 30,500; Referee: Yuri Baskakov

30 August 2008 20	Zenit St. Petersburg	2–2	Saturn Ramenskoye	Saint Petersburg
MSK (UTC+4)	Fayzulin 7'; Domínguez (yellow card) 78'; Tekke 82'	Summary	Karyaka 9'; Topić 41'; Ďurica (yellow card) 81'; Kinský (yellow card) 90+'	Stadium: Petrovsky Stadium; Attendance: 21,000; Referee: Maksim Layushkin

13 September 2008 21	Terek Grozny	1–4	Zenit St. Petersburg	Grozny
MSK (UTC+4)	Bouli (yellow card) 15'; Bendz (yellow card) 39' (goal) 75'; Kuznetsov (yellow card) 90+'	Summary	Arshavin 12'; Križanac 23'; Tymoshchuk (yellow card) 25'; Anyukov (yellow card) 32'; Pogrebnyak 41'; Zyryanov 70'	Stadium: Sultan Bilimkhanov Stadium; Attendance: 13,000; Referee: Igor Egorov

21 September 2008 22	Zenit St. Petersburg	1–3	CSKA Moscow	Saint Petersburg
16:00 MSK (UTC+4)	Arshavin (yellow card) 35'; Denisov (yellow card) 37'; Puygrenier (yellow card) 56'; Zyryanov (yellow card) 86'; Pogrebnyak 88'	Report	Dzagoev 3', 65'; Mamayev (yellow card) 37'; Akinfeev (yellow card) 63'; Love 57' (pen.); Grigoryev (yellow card) 77' (yellow-red card) 90+'	Stadium: Petrovsky Stadium; Attendance: 22,000; Referee: Stanislav Sukhina

27 September 2008 23	Lokomotiv Moscow	0–3	Zenit St. Petersburg	Moscow
16:00 MSK (UTC+4)	Torbinski (yellow card) 50'; Rodolfo (yellow card) 77'	Summary	Fayzulin 18'; Denisov (yellow card) 37'; Šírl (yellow card) 44'; Puygrenier 61'; Domínguez 74'	Stadium: Lokomotiv Stadium; Attendance: 19,630; Referee: Igor Egorov

5 October 2008 24	Zenit St. Petersburg	8–1	Luch-Energiya Vladivostok	Saint Petersburg
18:00 MSK (UTC+4)	Danny 7', 42' (yellow card) 41'; Puygrenier (yellow card) 16'; Arshavin 20'; Tekke (yellow card) 28' (goal) 47', 60', 89'; Shirokov 35'; Domínguez 72'	Summary	Bulyga 74'; Dantsev (yellow card) 90+'	Stadium: Petrovsky Stadium; Attendance: 20,000; Referee: Igor Zakharov

18 October 2008 25	Spartak Nalchik	2–2	Zenit St. Petersburg	Nalchik
16:45 MSK (UTC+4)	Shumeyko 18'; Geteriev (yellow card) 29'; Gogua (yellow card) 36'; Samsonov (yellow card) 45'; Dzakhmishev (yellow card) 61'; Mashukov 86'	Summary	Tymoshchuk (yellow card) 34'; Šírl (yellow card) 54'; Domínguez (yellow card) 63' (goal) 72'; Arshavin 81'; Zyryanov (yellow card) 84'	Stadium: Spartak Stadium; Attendance: 10,000; Referee: Aleksandr Kolobaev

26 October 2008 26	Tom Tomsk	1–1	Zenit St. Petersburg	Tomsk
15:00 MSK (UTC+4)	Maznov 23'; Klimov (yellow card) 81'	Summary	Fayzulin 20'; Tekke (yellow card) 61'; Zyryanov (yellow card) 64'	Stadium: Trud Stadium; Attendance: 14,800; Referee: Almir Kayumov

31 October 2008 27	Zenit St. Petersburg	1–0	Khimki	Saint Petersburg
MSK (UTC+4)	Danny 16' (yellow card) 90+'; Puygrenier (yellow card) 25'; Križanac (yellow card) 89'	Summary	Trivunović (yellow card) 21'; Čeh (yellow card) 66'; Sabitov (yellow card) 68'	Stadium: Petrovsky Stadium; Attendance: 18,500; Referee: Aleksey Kovalyov

9 November 2008 28	Amkar Perm	1–1	Zenit St. Petersburg	Perm
14:00 MSK (UTC+4)	Sikimić (yellow card) 67'; Peev 70'; Sirakov (yellow card) 80'	Summary	Šírl (yellow card) 10'; Hubočan (yellow card) 20'; Anyukov (yellow card) 58'; Tymoshchuk 80' (pen.)	Stadium: Zvezda Stadium; Attendance: 18,500; Referee: Aleksandr Gvardis

16 November 2008 29	Zenit St. Petersburg	1–1	Dynamo Moscow	Saint Petersburg
14:00 MSK (UTC+4)	Danny (yellow card) 19'; Tekke 80'; Šírl (yellow card) 90'; Tymoshchuk (yellow card) 90+'	Summary	Wilkshire (yellow card) 29'; D.Kombarov (yellow card) 38'; Granat (yellow card) 39'; Fernández 54'; Khokhlov (yellow card) 90+'	Stadium: Petrovsky Stadium; Attendance: 20,500; Referee: Stanislav Sukhina

22 November 2008 30	Spartak Moscow	1–3	Zenit St. Petersburg	Moscow
14:00 MSK (UTC+4)	Fathi (yellow card) 29'; Covalciuc (yellow card) 32'; Pavlenko 47'	Summary	Pogrebnyak 5'; Danny 19', 45+1'; Anyukov (yellow card) 23'	Stadium: Luzhniki Stadium; Attendance: 30,000; Referee: Igor Egorov

==== League table ====
Pos	Team	Pld	W	D	L	GF	GA	GD	Pts	Qualification or relegation
3	Dynamo Moscow	30	15	9	6	41	29	+12	54	Qualification to Champions League third qualifying round
4	Amkar Perm	30	14	9	7	31	22	+9	51	Qualification to Europa League play-off round
5	Zenit St. Petersburg	30	12	12	6	59	37	+22	48 (Note: Zenit St. Petersburg ahead of Krylia Sovetov on head-to-head points; Zenit St. Petersburg–Krylia Sovetov 1–1, Krylia Sovetov–Zenit St. Petersburg 0–3.)	Qualification to Europa League play-off round
6	Krylia Sovetov Samara	30	12	12	6	46	28	+18	48	Qualification to Europa League third qualifying round (Note: Since both finalists of the 2008–09 Russian Cup qualified for the 2009–10 UEFA Champions League, Krylia Sovetov earned a spot in the third qualifying round of the 2009–10 UEFA Europa League.)
7	Lokomotiv Moscow	30	13	8	9	37	32	+5	47	

Source: RFPL (in Russian)
Rules for classification: 1st points; 2nd matches won; 3rd head-to-head (points, matches won, goal difference, goals scored, away goals scored); 4th goal difference; 5th goals scored; 6th away goals scored; 7th position in previous season or decision game

=== Russian Cup ===
6 August 2008 Fifth round	Sibir Novosibirsk	1–0	Zenit St.Petersburg	Novosibirsk
16:00 MSK (UTC+4)	Bukhryakov (yellow card) 10'; Shvetsov (yellow card) 13'; Samoylov (yellow card) 39'; Medvedev 64'	Report	Ricksen (yellow card) 20'; Puygrenier (yellow card) 35'; Hubočan (yellow card) 41'; Radimov (yellow card) 65'	Stadium: Spartak Stadium; Attendance: 12,500; Referee: Sergei Timofeyev

=== UEFA Cup ===
13 February 2008 Round of 32 1st leg	Zenit St.Petersburg (Russia)	1–0	(Spain) Villarreal	Saint Petersburg, Russia
20:00 MSK (UTC+4)	Anyukov (yellow card) 35'; Pogrebnyak 63' (yellow card) 73'; Kim (yellow card) 78'	Report	Cani (yellow card) 36'; Capdevila (yellow card) 82'	Stadium: Petrovsky Stadium; Attendance: 21,300; Referee: Michael Weiner (Germany)

21 February 2008 Round of 32 2nd leg	Villarreal (Spain)	2–1 (2–2 agg.)	(Russia) Zenit St.Petersburg	Villarreal, Spain
23:45 MSK (UTC+4)	Franco 75'; Tomasson 90'	Report	Shirokov (yellow card) 13' (yellow-red card) 47'; Šírl (yellow card) 24' (yellow-red card) 82'; Pogrebnyak 31'; Kim (yellow card) 45'; Malafeev (yellow card) 65'; Zyryanov (yellow card) 88'; Križanac (yellow card) 90+3'	Stadium: Estadio El Madrigal; Attendance: 18,000; Referee: Stefan Meissner (Austria)

6 March 2008 Round of 16 1st leg	Marseille (France)	3–1	(Russia) Zenit St.Petersburg	Marseille, France
23:45 MSK (UTC+4)	Cissé 37', 55'; M'bami (yellow card) 40'; Niang 48'; Zubar (yellow card) 54'	Report	Kim (yellow card) 27'; Ricksen (yellow card) 32'; Arshavin 82'	Stadium: Stade Vélodrome; Attendance: 35,000; Referee: Knut Kircher (Germany)

12 March 2008 Round of 16 2nd leg	Zenit St.Petersburg (Russia)	2–0 (3–3 agg.)	(France) Marseille	Saint Petersburg, Russia
19:30 MSK (UTC+4)	Denisov (yellow card) 10'; Pogrebnyak 39', 78'; Tymoshchuk (yellow card) 64'; Arshavin (yellow card) 90+3'	Report	M'bami (yellow card) 33'; Niang (yellow card) 38'; Cissé (yellow card) 68'	Stadium: Petrovsky Stadium; Attendance: 21,000; Referee: Mike Riley (England)

3 April 2008 Quarterfinal 1st leg	Bayer Leverkusen (Germany)	1–4	(Russia) Zenit St.Petersburg	Leverkusen, Germany
20:30 MSK (UTC+4)	Kießling 33'; Barnetta (yellow card) 73'; Friedrich (yellow card) 79'	Report	Arshavin 20'; Križanac (yellow card) 23'; Pogrebnyak 52'; Anyukov 61'; Denisov 64'	Stadium: BayArena; Attendance: 19,500; Referee: Olegário Benquerença (Portugal)

10 April 2008 Quarterfinal 2nd leg	Zenit St.Petersburg (Russia)	0–1 (4–2 agg.)	(Germany) Bayer Leverkusen	Saint Petersburg, Russia
20:30 MSK (UTC+4)		Report	Bulykin 18'; Freier (yellow card) 29'; Castro (yellow card) 29'; Sinkiewicz (yellow card) 65'	Stadium: Petrovsky Stadium; Attendance: 21,500; Referee: Manuel Mejuto González (Spain)

24 April 2008 Semifinal 1st leg	Bayern Munich (Germany)	1–1	(Russia) Zenit St.Petersburg	Munich, Germany
22:45 MSK (UTC+4)	Ribéry 18'	Report	Ricksen (yellow card) 17'; Fayzulin (yellow card) 28'; Lúcio 60' (o.g.); Šírl (yellow card) 75'; Arshavin (yellow card) 79'	Stadium: Allianz Arena; Attendance: 66,000; Referee: Ľuboš Micheľ (Slovakia)

1 May 2008 Semifinal 2nd leg	Zenit St.Petersburg (Russia)	4–0 (5–1 agg.)	(Germany) Bayern Munich	Saint Petersburg, Russia
20:30 MSK (UTC+4)	Pogrebnyak 4', 73' (yellow card) 76'; Zyryanov 38'; Fayzulin 53'	Report	Toni (yellow card) 67'; Lell (yellow card) 81'	Stadium: Petrovsky Stadium; Attendance: 22,000; Referee: Tom Henning Øvrebø (Norway)

==== Final ====
14 May 2008	Zenit St.Petersburg (Russia)	2–0	(Scotland) Rangers	Manchester, England
22:45 MSK (UTC+4)	Denisov (yellow card) 72' (goal) 72'; Malafeev (yellow card) 90+2'; Zyryanov 90+3'	Report	Broadfoot (yellow card) 90+4'	Stadium: City of Manchester Stadium; Attendance: 45,000; Referee: Peter Fröjdfeldt (Sweden)

=== UEFA Champions League ===
==== Group stage ====
Pos	Team	Pld	W	D	L	GF	GA	GD	Pts	Qualification
1	(Italy) Juventus	6	3	3	0	7	3	+4	12	Advance to knockout phase
2	(Spain) Real Madrid	6	4	0	2	9	5	+4	12	Advance to knockout phase
3	(Russia) Zenit Saint Petersburg	6	1	2	3	4	7	−3	5	Transfer to UEFA Cup
4	(Belarus) BATE Borisov	6	0	3	3	3	8	−5	3	

Source: RSSSF

17 September 2008 1	Juventus (Italy)	1–0	(Russia) Zenit St.Petersburg	Turin, Italy
22:45 MSK (UTC+4)	Del Piero 76'; Salihamidžić (yellow card) 84'	Report	Pogrebnyak (yellow card) 18'; Šírl (yellow card) 68'	Stadium: Stadio Olimpico; Attendance: 20,853; Referee: Frank De Bleeckere (Belgium)

30 September 2008 2	Zenit St.Petersburg (Russia)	1–2	(Spain) Real Madrid	Saint Petersburg, Russia
20:30 MSK (UTC+4)	Danny 25'; Arshavin (yellow card) 26'; Tymoshchuk (yellow card) 33'; Hubočan (yellow card) 47'	Report	Hubočan 4' (o.g.); Van Nistelrooy 31' (yellow card) 47'	Stadium: Petrovsky Stadium; Attendance: 21,075; Referee: Massimo Busacca (Switzerland)

21 October 2008 3	Zenit St.Petersburg (Russia)	1–1	(Belarus) BATE Borisov	Saint Petersburg, Russia
20:30 MSK (UTC+4)	Tekke 80'	Report	Nyakhaychyk 52'; Vyeramko (yellow card) 90+4'	Stadium: Petrovsky Stadium; Attendance: 19,500; Referee: Pedro Proença (Portugal)

5 November 2008 4	BATE Borisov (Belarus)	0–2	(Russia) Zenit St.Petersburg	Minsk, Belarus
22:45 MSK (UTC+4)		Report	Pogrebnyak 34'; Puygrenier (yellow card) 39' (yellow-red card) 73'; Danny 90+4'	Stadium: Dinamo Stadium; Attendance: 28,793; Referee: Stéphane Lannoy (France)

25 November 2008 5	Zenit St.Petersburg (Russia)	0–0	(Italy) Juventus	Saint Petersburg, Russia
20:30 MSK (UTC+4)	Lombaerts (yellow card) 10'; Tymoshchuk (yellow card) 76'	Report	Iaquinta (yellow card) 43'; Camoranesi (yellow card) 45'; Sissoko (yellow card) 90+2'	Stadium: Petrovsky Stadium; Attendance: 20,155; Referee: Claus Bo Larsen (Denmark)

10 December 2008 6	Real Madrid (Spain)	3–0	(Russia) Zenit St.Petersburg	Madrid, Spain
22:45 MSK (UTC+4)	Raúl 25', 57'; Robben 50'	Report	Danny (yellow card) 63'; Šírl (yellow card) 26'	Stadium: Santiago Bernabéu Stadium; Attendance: 46,265; Referee: Jonas Eriksson (Sweden)

== Squad statistics ==
As of match played 10 December 2008

=== Appearances and goals ===
No.	Pos	Nat	Player	Total		Premier League		Russian Cup		Europe		Super Cups	
No.	Pos	Nat	Player	Apps	Goals	Apps	Goals	Apps	Goals	Apps	Goals	Apps	Goals
2	MF	(Russia) RUS	Vladislav Radimov	7	0	0+3	0	1	0	0+2	0	0+1	0
4	DF	(Croatia) CRO	Ivica Križanac	41	1	25	1	0	0	13+1	0	2	0
5	DF	(South Korea) KOR	Kim Dong-jin	14	0	5+5	0	0	0	3+1	0	0	0
6	DF	(Belgium) BEL	Nicolas Lombaerts	5	0	2	0	0	0	3	0	0	0
7	MF	(Argentina) ARG	Alejandro Domínguez	28	4	13+8	4	1	0	1+4	0	1	0
8	FW	(Russia) RUS	Pavel Pogrebnyak	34	16	14+4	6	0	0	13+1	8	2	2
9	FW	(Turkey) TUR	Fatih Tekke	28	9	12+10	8	1	0	2+3	1	0	0
10	MF	(Russia) RUS	Andrey Arshavin	43	9	26+1	6	0	0	14	2	1+1	1
11	MF	(Czech Republic) CZE	Radek Šírl	41	0	26	0	0	0	13	0	2	0
14	DF	(Slovakia) SVK	Tomáš Hubočan	15	0	7+4	0	1	0	1+1	0	1	0
15	MF	(Russia) RUS	Roman Shirokov	39	3	20+7	3	0	0	9+1	0	1+1	0
16	GK	(Russia) RUS	Vyacheslav Malafeev	48	0	30	0	1	0	15	0	2	0
17	MF	(South Korea) KOR	Lee Ho	3	0	0	0	1	0	0+2	0	0	0
18	MF	(Russia) RUS	Konstantin Zyryanov	46	9	29	7	0	0	15	2	2	0
19	MF	(Portugal) POR	Danny	17	8	10	5	0	0	6	2	1	1
20	MF	(Russia) RUS	Viktor Fayzulin	37	7	17+7	6	1	0	9+2	1	1	0
22	DF	(Russia) RUS	Aleksandr Anyukov	42	4	26	3	0	0	14	1	2	0
25	MF	(Netherlands) NED	Fernando Ricksen	11	0	4+4	0	1	0	2	0	0	0
27	MF	(Russia) RUS	Igor Denisov	44	3	29	1	0	0	12+1	2	1+1	0
28	DF	(France) FRA	Sébastien Puygrenier	14	1	8+1	1	1	0	3	0	1	0
34	DF	(Russia) RUS	Aleksandr Khokhlov	1	0	0	0	0+1	0	0	0	0	0
44	MF	(Ukraine) UKR	Anatoliy Tymoshchuk	44	6	27	6	0	0	15	0	2	0
57	MF	(Russia) RUS	Aleksei Ionov	7	0	0+5	0	1	0	0+1	0	0	0
88	MF	(Ukraine) UKR	Oleksandr Horshkov	4	0	0	0	1	0	2+1	0	0	0
Players away from the club on loan:
Players who left Zenit St.Petersburg during the season:

=== Goal scorers ===
Place	Position	Nation	Number	Name	Premier League	Russian Cup	UEFA Cup	UEFA Champions League	Russian Super Cup	UEFA Super Cup	Total
1	FW	(Russia)	8	Pavel Pogrebnyak	6	0	7	1	1	1	16
2	FW	(Turkey)	9	Fatih Tekke	8	0	0	1	0	0	9
2	MF	(Russia)	18	Konstantin Zyryanov	7	0	2	0	0	0	9
2	MF	(Russia)	10	Andrey Arshavin	6	0	2	0	1	0	9
5	MF	(Portugal)	19	Danny	5	0	0	2	0	1	8
6	MF	(Russia)	20	Viktor Fayzulin	6	0	1	0	0	0	7
7	MF	(Ukraine)	44	Anatoliy Tymoshchuk	6	0	0	0	0	0	6
8	MF	(Argentina)	7	Alejandro Domínguez	4	0	0	0	0	0	4
8	DF	(Russia)	22	Aleksandr Anyukov	3	0	1	0	0	0	4
10	MF	(Russia)	15	Roman Shirokov	3	0	0	0	0	0	3
10	MF	(Russia)	27	Igor Denisov	1	0	2	0	0	0	3
10				Own goal	2	0	1	0	0	0	3
13	DF	(Croatia)	4	Ivica Križanac	1	0	0	0	0	0	1
13	DF	(France)	28	Sébastien Puygrenier	1	0	0	0	0	0	1
				TOTALS	59	0	16	4	2	2	83

=== Clean sheets ===
Place	Position	Nation	Number	Name	Premier League	Russian Cup	UEFA Cup	UEFA Champions League	Russian Super Cup	UEFA Super Cup	Total
1	GK	(Russia)	16	Vyacheslav Malafeev	8	0	4	2	0	0	14
				TOTALS	8	0	4	2	0	0	14

=== Disciplinary record ===
Number	Nation	Position	Name	Premier League		Russian Cup		UEFA Cup		Champions League		Russian Super Cup		UEFA Super Cup		Total	
Number	Nation	Position	Name	Booked	Sent off (straight red)	Booked	Sent off (straight red)	Booked	Sent off (straight red)	Booked	Sent off (straight red)	Booked	Sent off (straight red)	Booked	Sent off (straight red)	Booked	Sent off (straight red)
2	(Russia)	MF	Vladislav Radimov	0	0	1	0	0	0	0	0	0	1	0	0	1	1
4	(Croatia)	DF	Ivica Križanac	0	0	0	0	2	0	0	0	2	1	0	0	4	1
5	(South Korea)	DF	Kim Dong-jin	0	0	0	0	3	0	0	0	0	0	0	0	3	0
6	(Belgium)	DF	Nicolas Lombaerts	0	0	0	0	0	0	1	0	0	0	0	0	1	0
8	(Russia)	FW	Pavel Pogrebnyak	0	0	0	0	2	0	1	0	0	0	0	0	3	0
10	(Russia)	MF	Andrey Arshavin	0	0	0	0	2	0	1	0	1	0	0	0	4	0
11	(Czech Republic)	MF	Radek Šírl	0	0	0	0	3	1	2	0	0	0	0	0	5	1
14	(Slovakia)	DF	Tomáš Hubočan	0	0	1	0	0	0	1	0	1	0	0	0	3	0
15	(Russia)	MF	Roman Shirokov	0	0	0	0	2	1	0	0	0	0	0	0	2	1
16	(Russia)	GK	Vyacheslav Malafeev	0	0	0	0	2	0	0	0	0	0	0	0	2	0
18	(Russia)	MF	Konstantin Zyryanov	0	0	0	0	1	0	0	0	1	0	0	0	2	0
19	(Portugal)	MF	Danny	0	0	0	0	0	0	1	0	0	0	0	0	1	0
20	(Russia)	MF	Viktor Fayzulin	0	0	0	0	1	0	0	0	0	0	0	0	1	0
22	(Russia)	DF	Aleksandr Anyukov	0	0	0	0	1	0	0	0	0	0	0	0	1	0
25	(Netherlands)	MF	Fernando Ricksen	0	0	1	0	2	0	0	0	0	0	0	0	3	0
27	(Russia)	MF	Igor Denisov	0	0	0	0	2	0	0	0	0	0	0	0	2	0
28	(France)	DF	Sébastien Puygrenier	0	0	1	0	0	0	2	1	0	0	0	0	3	1
44	(Ukraine)	MF	Anatoliy Tymoshchuk	0	0	0	0	1	0	2	0	0	0	0	0	3	0
			TOTALS	0	0	4	0	24	2	11	1	5	2	0	0	44	5
