= 2007 Russian Premier League =

16th season of top-tier football league in Russia

Russian Premier League
- Season: 2007
- Champions: Zenit St.Petersburg
- Relegated: Kuban Krasnodar; Rostov
- Champions League: Zenit St.Petersburg; Spartak Moscow
- Europa League: CSKA Moscow; FC Moscow
- Intertoto Cup: Saturn Ramenskoye
- Matches: 240
- Goals: 562 (2.34 per match)
- Top goalscorer: Roman Pavlyuchenko & Roman Adamov (20)

The 2007 Russian Premier League was the 16th season of the Russian Football Championship, and the sixth under the current Russian Premier League name. The league was sponsored by insurance company Rosgosstrakh.

The season started on 10 March 2007 with the match between Luch-Energia and FC Moscow in Vladivostok, with the first goal of the season being scored by FC Moscow striker Héctor Bracamonte. It ended on 11 November 2007, when Zenit St. Petersburg claimed their first title with an away win over Saturn. Zenit became the second non-Moscow club to win the league, after Alania Vladikavkaz in 1995.

Spartak Moscow finished runners-up for the third consecutive season, while defending champions CSKA Moscow finished third.

== Teams ==
As in the previous season, 16 teams played in the 2007 season. After the 2006 season, Torpedo Moscow and Shinnik Yaroslavl were relegated to the 2007 Russian First Division. They were replaced by Khimki and Kuban Krasnodar, the winners and runners up of the 2006 Russian First Division.

=== Venues ===
Amkar	CSKA	Dynamo	Khimki
Zvezda Stadium	Luzhniki Stadium	Central Stadium	Rodina Stadium
Capacity: 17,000	Capacity: 81,000	Capacity: 36,540	Capacity: 3,760
Krylia	Locations of teams in 2007 Russian Premier League Locations of teams in 2007 Russian Premier League, Tomsk & Vladivostok		Kuban
Metallurg Stadium	Locations of teams in 2007 Russian Premier League Locations of teams in 2007 Russian Premier League, Tomsk & Vladivostok		Kuban Stadium
Capacity: 27,084	Locations of teams in 2007 Russian Premier League Locations of teams in 2007 Russian Premier League, Tomsk & Vladivostok		Capacity: 28,800
Lokomotiv	Locations of teams in 2007 Russian Premier League Locations of teams in 2007 Russian Premier League, Tomsk & Vladivostok		Luch-Energia
RZD Arena	Locations of teams in 2007 Russian Premier League Locations of teams in 2007 Russian Premier League, Tomsk & Vladivostok		Dynamo Stadium
Capacity: 33,001	Locations of teams in 2007 Russian Premier League Locations of teams in 2007 Russian Premier League, Tomsk & Vladivostok		Capacity: 10,200
Moscow	Locations of teams in 2007 Russian Premier League Locations of teams in 2007 Russian Premier League, Tomsk & Vladivostok		Rostov
Eduard Streltsov Stadium	Locations of teams in 2007 Russian Premier League Locations of teams in 2007 Russian Premier League, Tomsk & Vladivostok		Olimp-2
Capacity: 13,450	Locations of teams in 2007 Russian Premier League Locations of teams in 2007 Russian Premier League, Tomsk & Vladivostok		Capacity: 15,840
Rubin	Locations of teams in 2007 Russian Premier League Locations of teams in 2007 Russian Premier League, Tomsk & Vladivostok		Saturn
Central Stadium	Locations of teams in 2007 Russian Premier League Locations of teams in 2007 Russian Premier League, Tomsk & Vladivostok		Saturn Stadium
Capacity: 22,500	Locations of teams in 2007 Russian Premier League Locations of teams in 2007 Russian Premier League, Tomsk & Vladivostok		Capacity: 14,685
Spartak Moscow	Spartak Nalchik	Tom	Zenit Saint Petersburg
Luzhniki Stadium	Spartak Stadium	Trud Stadium	Petrovsky Stadium
Capacity: 81,029	Capacity: 14,149	Capacity: 10,028	Capacity: 21,570

=== Personnel and kits ===
Team	Location	Head coach	Captain	Kit manufacturer	Shirt sponsor
Amkar Perm	Perm	(Tajikistan) Rashid Rakhimov			
CSKA	Moscow	(Russia) Valery Gazzaev			
Dynamo	Moscow	(Russia) Andrey Kobelev			
Khimki	Khimki	(Serbia) Slavoljub Muslin			
Krylia	Samara	(Russia) Aleksandr Tarkhanov			
Kuban	Krasnodar	(Russia) Leonid Nazarenko (Caretaker)			
Lokomotiv	Moscow	(Russia) Anatoliy Byshovets			
Luch-Energia	Vladivostok	(Russia) Sergei Pavlov			
Moscow	Moscow	(Russia) Leonid Slutsky			
Rostov	Rostov-on-Don	(Russia) Oleg Dolmatov			
Rubin	Kazan	(Turkmenistan) Kurban Berdyev			
Saturn	Ramenskoye	(Russia) Gadzhi Gadzhiyev			
Spartak	Moscow	(Russia) Stanislav Cherchesov			
Spartak	Nalchik	(Russia) Yuri Krasnozhan			
Tom	Tomsk	(Russia) Valery Petrakov			
Zenit	Saint Petersburg	(Netherlands) Dick Advocaat			

=== Managerial changes ===
Team	Outgoing manager	Manner of departure	Date of vacancy	Position in table	Replaced by	Date of appointment	Position in table
Lokomotiv	(Russia) Oleg Dolmatov	Fired	26 December 2006	Preseason	(Russia) Anatoliy Byshovets	26 December 2006	Preseason
Krylia	(Russia) Gadzhi Gadzhiyev			Preseason	(Russia) Sergei Oborin		Preseason
Kuban	(Ukraine) Pavlo Yakovenko		April 2007		(Russia) Leonid Nazarenko (Caretaker)	April 2007	
Saturn	(Slovakia) Vladimír Weiss		May 2007		(Russia) Gadzhi Gadzhiyev	May 2007	
Rostov	(Russia) Sergei Balakhnin		July 2007		(Ukraine) Pavlo Yakovenko	July 2007	
Rostov	(Ukraine) Pavlo Yakovenko		July 2007		(Russia) Oleg Dolmatov	23 July 2007	
Spartak	(Russia) Vladimir Fedotov		June 2007		(Russia) Stanislav Cherchesov	19 June 2007	
Krylia	(Russia) Sergei Oborin		August 2007		(Russia) Aleksandr Tarkhanov	August 2007	
Kuban	(Russia) Leonid Nazarenko (Caretaker)		August 2007		(Russia) Soferbi Yeshugov	August 2007	
Khimki	(Russia) Vladimir Kazachyonok		September 2007		(Serbia) Slavoljub Muslin	7 September 2007	
Kuban	(Russia) Soferbi Yeshugov		September 2007		(Russia) Leonid Nazarenko (Caretaker)	September 2007	

== Tournament format and regulations ==
Based on paragraph 15.3 of the Russian Premier League regulations for the current season, if two or more teams are equal on points (without having the highest number), the positions of these teams are determined by:

1. higher number of wins in all matches;
2. higher goal difference in all matches;
3. results of matches between the teams in question (1. higher number of points obtained; 2. higher number of wins; 3. higher goal difference; 4. higher number of goals scored; 5. higher number of away goals scored);
4. higher number of goals scored in all matches;
5. higher number of away goals scored in all matches;
6. drawing of lots.

Based on paragraph 15.4 of the regulations, if two teams are equal on the highest number of points, the first position is determined by:

1. higher number of wins in all matches;
2. results of matches between the two teams (1. higher number of points obtained; 2. higher goal difference; 3. higher number of goals scored; 4. higher number of away goals scored);
3. drawing of lots, or an additional match between the two teams, with extra time and a penalty shoot-out if necessary.

Based on paragraph 15.5 of the regulations, if more than two teams are equal on the highest number of points, the first position and subsequent positions of these teams are determined by:

1. higher number of wins in all matches;
2. higher goal difference in all matches;
3. results of matches between the teams in question (1. higher number of points obtained; 2. higher goal difference; 3. higher number of goals scored; 4. higher number of away goals scored);
4. drawing of lots, or an additional tournament between the teams in question.^{1}

^{1}The terms of this additional tournament are determined by the Russian Football Union and the governing body of the Russian Premier League based on suggestions from the participating clubs.

== League table ==
Pos	Team	Pld	W	D	L	GF	GA	GD	Pts	Qualification or relegation
1	Zenit St. Petersburg (C)	30	18	7	5	54	32	+22	61	Qualification to Champions League group stage
2	Spartak Moscow	30	17	8	5	50	30	+20	59	Qualification to Champions League third qualifying round
3	CSKA Moscow	30	14	11	5	43	24	+19	53	Qualification to UEFA Cup first round (Note: Qualified as the winner of 2007–08 Russian Cup)
4	FC Moscow	30	15	7	8	40	32	+8	52	Qualification to UEFA Cup second qualifying round
5	Saturn	30	11	12	7	34	28	+6	45	Qualification to Intertoto Cup second round
6	Dynamo Moscow	30	11	8	11	37	35	+2	41	
7	Lokomotiv Moscow	30	11	8	11	39	42	−3	41	
8	Amkar Perm	30	10	11	9	30	27	+3	41	
9	Khimki	30	9	10	11	32	33	−1	37	
10	Rubin Kazan	30	10	5	15	31	39	−8	35	
11	Tom Tomsk	30	8	11	11	37	35	+2	35	
12	Spartak Nalchik	30	8	9	13	29	38	−9	33	
13	Krylia Sovetov Samara	30	8	8	14	35	46	−11	32	
14	Luch-Energiya Vladivostok	30	8	8	14	26	39	−13	32	
15	Kuban Krasnodar (R)	30	7	11	12	27	38	−11	32	Relegation to First Division
16	Rostov (R)	30	2	12	16	18	44	−26	18	Relegation to First Division

Source: RFPL
Rules for classification: 1st points; 2nd matches won; 3rd goal difference; 4th head-to-head (points, matches won, goal difference, goals scored, away goals scored); 5th goals scored; 6th away goals scored; 7th drawing of lots
(C) Champions; (R) Relegated

== Results ==
Home \ Away	AMK	CSK	DYN	KHI	KRY	KUB	LOK	LUE	MOS	ROS	RUB	SAT	SPA	SPN	TOM	ZEN
Amkar Perm		1–1	1–1	3–1	4–1	0–0	1–0	1–0	1–1	3–1	2–1	3–1	0–1	1–1	3–3	1–1
CSKA Moscow	1–0		0–1	0–0	4–2	0–0	2–0	4–0	2–0	4–0	3–1	3–1	1–1	2–0	0–0	2–0
Dynamo Moscow	0–0	1–1		2–1	1–1	1–0	2–1	1–0	0–0	3–0	0–1	1–1	0–1	2–0	3–1	4–2
Khimki	1–0	1–1	1–0		4–1	1–0	1–2	3–0	1–3	1–0	0–0	0–0	3–0	1–0	1–1	2–2
Krylya Sovetov Samara	1–0	1–0	3–2	1–0		2–3	3–1	3–0	0–0	0–1	3–0	0–1	0–2	1–2	1–1	1–3
Kuban Krasnodar	1–1	0–1	0–4	1–1	3–2		0–0	1–1	4–1	1–0	0–1	2–2	0–0	2–2	2–1	1–1
Lokomotiv Moscow	0–1	1–2	2–2	1–0	5–2	2–3		1–1	1–1	2–0	2–1	0–2	4–3	3–1	0–0	1–0
Luch-Energiya Vladivostok	1–0	4–0	0–1	1–1	0–0	1–0	3–0		0–1	1–1	2–0	2–1	1–1	2–1	0–0	0–1
FC Moscow	3–1	2–1	4–1	0–2	3–1	1–0	1–2	3–1		1–0	2–1	3–2	2–0	1–0	2–0	0–3 (Note: The match was played on 1 July 2007 and originally ended with Moscow's 1–2 loss to Zenit. However, on 15 August 2007, Football Union of Russia decided to hand Moscow a 0–3 technical defeat and fine the club RUB 500,000 ($20,000) for fielding an ineligible player Roman Hubník, who was loaned to the club by Czech Sigma Olomouc until the end of June only, and was therefore ineligible to play in the match.)
Rostov	2–0	1–1	0–0	1–1	1–1	0–1	0–2	1–1	1–1		1–1	1–3	1–3	0–1	2–2	2–3
Rubin Kazan	1–0	0–1	2–1	2–1	1–0	2–2	3–0	3–0	1–1	0–0		0–1	3–1	2–1	1–3	1–4
Saturn	2–0	2–2	2–1	1–0	1–1	2–0	1–1	0–1	0–0	1–0	1–0		0–0	1–1	0–0	0–1
Spartak Moscow	0–0	1–1	2–1	2–0	1–0	4–0	1–2	2–1	3–1	3–0	2–1	2–0		2–2	3–2	3–1
Spartak Nalchik	0–1	1–1	4–1	1–1	0–0	1–0	0–0	2–0	1–0	0–0	1–0	1–3	1–2		1–0	0–3
Tom	0–1	0–1	1–0	3–1	1–2	2–0	4–2	3–1	1–2	1–1	2–0	1–1	1–1	2–0		0–1
Zenit St. Petersburg	0–0	2–1	3–0	4–1	1–1	1–0	1–1	3–1	1–0	2–0	2–1	1–1	1–3	4–3	2–1	

Legend: Blue = home team win; Yellow = draw; Red = away team win.

== Season statistics ==
=== Top goalscorers ===
As of matches played on 11 November 2007.

Rank	Player	Club	Goal
1	(Russia) Roman Pavlyuchenko	Spartak	14
1	(Russia) Roman Adamov	Moscow	14
3	(Brazil) Jô	CSKA	13
3	(Brazil) Vágner Love	CSKA	13
5	(Russia) Pavel Pogrebnyak	Zenit	11
5	(Russia) Dmitri Sychev	Lokomotiv	11
7	(Russia) Andrey Arshavin	Zenit	10
7	(Russia) Andrei Karyaka	Saturn	10
7	(Bulgaria) Martin Kushev	Amkar	10
10	(Russia) Konstantin Zyryanov	Zenit	9
10	(North Macedonia) Goran Maznov	Tom	9
10	(Russia) Dmitri Kirichenko	Saturn	9
10	(Georgia (country)) Davit Mujiri	Krylia	9
10	(Russia) Denis Kolodin	Dynamo	9

=== Statistics ===
- Goals: 562 (average 2.34 per match)
  - From penalties: 57 (10%)
  - Saved/Missed penalties: 17 (23%)
  - Goals scored home: 348 (62%)
  - Goals scored away: 214 (38%)
- Yellow cards: 1080 (average 4.50 per match)
  - For violent conduct: 563 (52%)
  - For unsporting behaviour: 425 (39%)
  - For undisciplined behaviour: 8 (1%)
  - Other: 84 (8%)
- Red cards: 49 (average 0.20 per match)
  - For second yellow card: 27 (55%)
  - For violent conduct: 9 (18%)
  - For unsporting behaviour: 5 (9%)
  - For undisciplined behaviour: 4 (8%)
  - For denying an obvious goal-scoring opportunity: 4 (8%)
- Attendance: 3,147,567 (average 13,114 per match; 104,919 per matchday)

== Awards ==
On 30 November 2007 Russian Football Union named its list of 33 top players:

Goalkeepers

1. (Czech Republic) Antonín Kinský (Saturn)
2. (Russia) Vladimir Gabulov (Kuban)
3. (Croatia) Stipe Pletikosa (Spartak Moscow)

Right backs

1. (Serbia) Branislav Ivanović (Lokomotiv Moscow)
2. (Russia) Aleksandr Anyukov (Zenit)
3. (Russia) Vasili Berezutskiy (CSKA Moscow)

Right-centre backs

1. (Russia) Sergei Ignashevich (CSKA Moscow)
2. (Russia) Denis Kolodin (Dynamo Moscow)
3. (Czech Republic) Radoslav Kováč (Spartak Moscow)

Left-centre backs

1. (Slovakia) Ján Ďurica (Saturn)
2. (Austria) Martin Stranzl (Spartak Moscow)
3. (Belgium) Nicolas Lombaerts (Zenit)

Left backs

1. (Russia) Aleksei Berezutskiy (CSKA Moscow)
2. (South Korea) Kim Dong-Jin (Zenit)
3. (Bosnia and Herzegovina) Emir Spahić (Lokomotiv Moscow)

Defensive midfielders

1. (Ukraine) Anatoliy Tymoschuk (Zenit)
2. (Russia) Dmitri Khokhlov (Dynamo Moscow)
3. (Russia) Aleksei Igonin (Saturn)

Right wingers

1. (Serbia) Miloš Krasić (CSKA Moscow)
2. (Russia) Vladimir Bystrov (Spartak Moscow)
3. (Russia) Aleksei Ivanov (Luch-Energia and Saturn)

Central midfielders

1. (Russia) Konstantin Zyryanov (Zenit)
2. (Russia) Yegor Titov (Spartak Moscow)
3. (Russia) Igor Semshov (Dynamo Moscow)

Left wingers

1. (Russia) Yuri Zhirkov (CSKA Moscow)
2. (Russia) Diniyar Bilyaletdinov (Lokomotiv Moscow)
3. (Russia) Dmitri Torbinsky (Spartak Moscow)

Right forwards

1. (Brazil) Vágner Love (CSKA Moscow)
2. (Russia) Roman Pavlyuchenko (Spartak Moscow)
3. (Portugal) Danny (Dynamo Moscow)

Left forwards

1. (Russia) Andrei Arshavin (Zenit)
2. (Brazil) Jô (CSKA Moscow)
3. (Russia) Dmitri Sychev (Lokomotiv Moscow)

== Medal squads ==
1. FC Zenit St. Petersburg

Goalkeepers: Vyacheslav Malafeev (19), Kamil Čontofalský (Slovakia) (13).
Defenders: Kim Dong-Jin (South Korea) (24 / 2), Martin Škrtel (Slovakia) (23 / 1), Aleksandr Anyukov (22 / 2), Erik Hagen (Norway) (15), Ivica Križanac (Croatia) (15), Nicolas Lombaerts (Belgium) (13 / 2).
Midfielders: Anatoliy Tymoshchuk (Ukraine) (29 / 4), Konstantin Zyryanov (27 / 9), Igor Denisov (25 / 3), Alejandro Domínguez (Argentina) (24 / 3), Radek Šírl (Czech Republic) (22 / 1), Vladislav Radimov (17 / 1), Fernando Ricksen (Netherlands) (14), Aleksandr Gorshkov (Ukraine) (11), Ilya Maksimov (6), Yuri Lebedev (1).
Forwards: Andrei Arshavin (30 / 10), Pavel Pogrebnyak (24 / 11), Fatih Tekke (Turkey) (16 / 4).
(league appearances and goals listed in brackets)

Manager: Dick Advocaat (Netherlands) .

Transferred out during the season: none.

2. FC Spartak Moscow

Goalkeepers: Stipe Pletikosa (Croatia) (29), Dmitri Khomich (1).
Defenders: Roman Shishkin (26), Martin Stranzl (Austria) (19 / 2), Florin Şoavă (Romania) (18), Renat Sabitov (15), Géder (Brazil) (14 / 1), Martin Jiránek (Czech Republic) (11), Andrei Ivanov (7), Fyodor Kudryashov (7), Ignas Dedura (Lithuania) (6 / 1).
Midfielders: Yegor Titov (27 / 7), Radoslav Kováč (Czech Republic) (26 / 1), Dmitri Torbinski (24 / 3), Denis Boyarintsev (24 / 3), Maksym Kalynychenko (Ukraine) (22 / 3), Vladimir Bystrov (18 / 3), Mozart (Brazil) (18 / 1), Quincy (Ghana) (6), Aleksei Rebko (3), Serghei Covalciuc (Moldova) (2), Sergei Parshivlyuk (2), Oleg Dineyev (1).
Forwards: Roman Pavlyuchenko (22 / 14), Nikita Bazhenov (16 / 4), Artyom Dzyuba (16 / 1), Welliton (Brazil) (12 / 4), Aleksandr Prudnikov (12 / 2).

Manager: Vladimir Fedotov (until June), Stanislav Cherchesov (from June).

Transferred out during the season: Oleg Dineyev (on loan to FC Shinnik Yaroslavl), Quincy (Ghana) (on loan to (Spain) Celta de Vigo).

3. PFC CSKA Moscow

Goalkeepers: Veniamin Mandrykin (20), Igor Akinfeev (10), Yevgeny Pomazan (1).
Defenders: Sergei Ignashevich (26 / 3), Vasili Berezutski (26 / 1), Aleksei Berezutski (26), Deividas Šemberas (Lithuania) (24), Anton Grigoryev (10), Chidi Odiah (Nigeria) (4).
Midfielders: Yuri Zhirkov (29 / 2), Evgeni Aldonin (27 / 2), Elvir Rahimić (Bosnia and Herzegovina) (27), Miloš Krasić (Serbia) (22 / 4), Rolan Gusev (16), Dudu (Brazil) (15 / 1), Ivan Taranov (13), Caner Erkin (Turkey) (8), Eduardo Ratinho (Brazil) (6 / 1), Pavel Mamayev (4), Daniel Carvalho (Brazil) (4), Sergei Gorelov (2).
Forwards: Jô (Brazil) (27 / 13), Vágner Love (Brazil) (23 / 13), Ramón (Brazil) (18 / 1), Dawid Janczyk (Poland) (10 / 1), Nikita Burmistrov (6), Dmitry Tikhonov (2).

Manager: Valery Gazzaev.

Transferred out during the season: none.

== Attendances ==
No.	Club	Average	Change	Highest
1	Spartak Moscow	24,067	39,8%	68,000
2	Kuban	21,147	82,0%	28,800
3	Zenit	20,604	-6,1%	21,500
4	Krylia Sovetov	18,533	9,1%	26,000
5	Amkar	16,097	19,2%	19,000
6	PFC CSKA	14,547	33,3%	55,000
7	Lokomotiv Moscow	13,332	2,0%	27,503
8	Spartak Nalchik	13,100	-3,3%	14,200
9	FC Tom	13,033	1,8%	15,000
10	Rubin	11,767	-14,3%	20,000
11	Saturn	10,684	1,5%	16,000
12	Luch	9,747	-1,7%	10,200
13	Dynamo Moscow	9,733	20,7%	27,000
14	Rostov	7,500	-16,5%	12,500
15	FC Khimki	7,286	194,9%	10,500
16	FC Moscow	5,513	3,9%	10,000

== See also ==
- 2007 in Russian football
