= Okorokov =

Okorokov is a surname. Notable people with the surname include:

- Georgii Okorokov (born 1996), Russian-Australian freestyle wrestler
- Yegor Okorokov (born 1989), Russian footballer
- Yevgeniy Okorokov (1959–2022), Russian long-distance runner
