= Radek Šírl =

Czech footballer

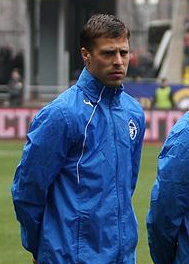
- Šírl in March 2009

Personal information
- Date of birth: 20 March 1981 (age 45)
- Place of birth: Rudná, Czechoslovakia
- Height: 1.80 m (5 ft 11 in)
- Positions: Left midfielder; left-back

Youth career
- 1987–1995: TJ Rudná
- 1995: Admira/Slavoj Prague
- 1996–2000: Bohemians Prague

Senior career*
Years	Team	Apps	(Gls)
2000	Sokol-Semice		
2000–2001	Bohemians 1905	19	(1)
2001	Sparta Prague	1	(0)
2002	→ Bohemians 1905 (loan)	29	(2)
2003–2010	Zenit Saint Petersburg	131	(6)
2010–2012	Mladá Boleslav	38	(0)
2012–2014	Viktoria Plzeň	0	(0)
2012–2013	→ Mladá Boleslav (loan)	12	(0)
2013	→ Bohemians 1905 (loan)	11	(1)
2014–2016	Bohemians 1905	34	(0)

International career
2001–2002	Czech Republic U-21	6	(0)
2006–2009	Czech Republic	8	(0)
- * Club domestic league appearances and goals

Radek Šírl (born 20 March 1981) is a Czech former professional footballer who played as a left midfielder or left-back.

== Career ==
=== Club ===
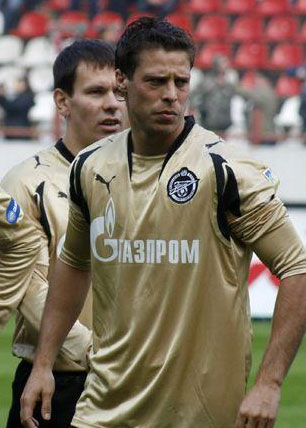
Šírl alongside fellow Zenit player Konstantin Zyryanov

Šírl was born in Rudná.

Šírl and Zenit St. Petersburg agreed to the mutual termination of his contract on 7 September 2010. A few days later, Šírl signed a two-year contract with Mladá Boleslav.

== Career statistics ==
=== Club ===
Appearances and goals by club, season and competition
Club	Season	League			National Cup		Continental		Other		Total	
Club	Season	Division	Apps	Goals	Apps	Goals	Apps	Goals	Apps	Goals	Apps	Goals
Zenit St. Petersburg	2003	Russian Premier League	18	1	1	0	–		4	1	23	2
Zenit St. Petersburg	2004	Russian Premier League	10	1	6	0	1	0	–		17	1
Zenit St. Petersburg	2005	Russian Premier League	14	1	6	0	2	0	–		22	1
Zenit St. Petersburg	2006	Russian Premier League	24	2	4	0	6	0	–		34	2
Zenit St. Petersburg	2007	Russian Premier League	22	1	4	0	6	0	–		32	1
Zenit St. Petersburg	2008	Russian Premier League	26	0	0	0	13	0	2	0	41	0
Zenit St. Petersburg	2009	Russian Premier League	17	0	1	0	3	0	–		21	0
Zenit St. Petersburg	2010	Russian Premier League	0	0	0	0	0	0	–		0	0
Zenit St. Petersburg	Total		131	6	22	1	31	0	6	1	189	8
Mladá Boleslav	2010–11	Czech First League	14	0	5	0	2	0	–		21	0
Mladá Boleslav	2011–12	Czech First League	24	0	3	0	2	0	1	0	30	0
Mladá Boleslav	Total		38	0	8	0	4	0	1	0	51	0
Viktoria Plzeň	2012–13	Czech First League	0	0	0	0	0	0	0	0	0	0
Viktoria Plzeň	2013–14	Czech First League	0	0	0	0	0	0	0	0	0	0
Viktoria Plzeň	Total		0	0	0	0	0	0	0	0	0	0
Mladá Boleslav (loan)	2012–13	Czech First League	12	0	0	0	–		–		12	0
Bohemians 1905 (loan)	2013–14	Czech First League	11	1	0	0	–		–		11	1
Bohemians 1905	2014–15	Czech First League	24	0	3	0	–		–		27	0
Bohemians 1905	2015–16	Czech First League	10	0	1	0	–		–		11	0
Bohemians 1905	Total		34	0	4	0	0	0	0	0	38	0
Career total			226	7	34	1	35	0	7	1	302	9

=== International ===
Czech Republic national team
Year	Apps	Goals
2006	1	0
2007	0	0
2008	5	0
2009	2	0
Total	8	0

== Honours ==
Zenit Saint Petersburg

- Russian Premier League Cup: 2003
- Russian Premier League: 2007
- Russian Super Cup: 2008
- UEFA Cup: 2008
- UEFA Super Cup: 2008
- Russian Cup: 2010

Mladá Boleslav

- Czech Cup: 2011
