= Kamil Čontofalský =

Slovak footballer

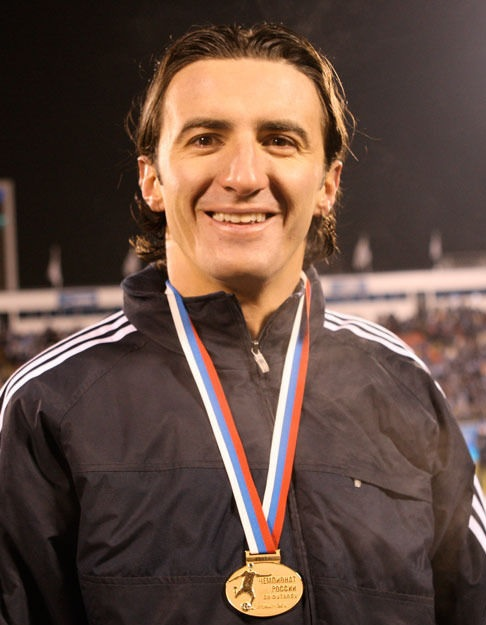
- Čontofalský with Zenit Saint Petersburg in 2007

Personal information
- Date of birth: 3 June 1978 (age 48)
- Place of birth: Košice, Czechoslovakia
- Height: 1.91 m (6 ft 3 in)
- Position: Goalkeeper

Team information
- Current team: FK Mladá Boleslav (GK coach)

Senior career*
Years	Team	Apps	(Gls)
1995–1997	Trenčín	?	(?)
1997–1999	Košice	13	(0)
1999–2003	Bohemians 1905	77	(0)
2003–2009	Zenit Saint Petersburg	45	(0)
2010	AEL Limassol	17	(0)
2011	AEL	8	(0)
2011–2014	Slavia Prague	30	(0)
2014	Fort Lauderdale Strikers	16	(0)
2015	Tampa Bay Rowdies	8	(0)

International career
2002–2007	Slovakia	34	(0)

Managerial career
- 2018: MAS Táborsko (GK coach)
- 2019: Slavia Prague B (GK coach)
- 2019–2020: Teplice (GK coach)
- 2021–2022: Slavoj Vyšehrad (GK coach)
- 2022–2023: Sparta Prague U14 (GK coach)
- 2024–: Mladá Boleslav (GK coach)
- * Club domestic league appearances and goals

Kamil Čontofalský (Slovak pronunciation: [ˈkamil ˈtʂɔntɔfalskiː]; born 3 June 1978) is a Slovak professional football coach and a former goalkeeper. He is the goalkeeping coach with FK Mladá Boleslav.

== Career ==
=== Club ===
Čontofalský spent four seasons with Bohemians 1905 in the Czech First League and seven seasons with Zenit Saint Petersburg in the Russian Premier League. With Zenit he won 6 titles, including the Russian Premier League 2007, the 2007–08 UEFA Cup and the 2008 UEFA Super Cup.

Čontofalský was released by Tampa Bay on 5 November 2015.

== Career statistics ==
=== Club ===
As of match played 31 October 2015

Appearances and goals by club, season and competition
Club	Season	League			National Cup		Continental		Other		Total	
Club	Season	Division	Apps	Goals	Apps	Goals	Apps	Goals	Apps	Goals	Apps	Goals
Zenit St. Petersburg	2003	Russian Premier League	3	0	1	0	-		-		4	0
Zenit St. Petersburg	2004	Russian Premier League	4	0	3	0	1	0	-		8	0
Zenit St. Petersburg	2005	Russian Premier League	19	0	3	0	8	0	-		30	0
Zenit St. Petersburg	2006	Russian Premier League	4	0	4	0	2	0	-		10	0
Zenit St. Petersburg	2007	Russian Premier League	13	0	2	0	5	0	-		20	0
Zenit St. Petersburg	2008	Russian Premier League	0	0	0	0	0	0	0	0	0	0
Zenit St. Petersburg	2009	Russian Premier League	2	0	1	0	1	0	-		4	0
Zenit St. Petersburg	Total		45	0	14	0	17	0	0	0	76	0
AEL Limassol	2009–10	Cypriot First Division	13	0			-		-		13	0
AEL Limassol	2010–11	Cypriot First Division	4	0			-		-		4	0
AEL Limassol	Total		17	0			-	-	-	-	17	0
AEL	2010–11	Super League Greece	8	0	0	0	-		-		8	0
Slavia Prague	2011–12	Czech First League	20	0	0	0	-		-		20	0
Slavia Prague	2012–13	Czech First League	27	0	0	0	-		-		27	0
Slavia Prague	2013–14	Czech First League	6	0	1	0	-		-		7	0
Slavia Prague	Total		53	0	1	0	-	-	-	-	54	0
Fort Lauderdale Strikers	2014	NASL	18	0	0	0	-		-		18	0
Tampa Bay Rowdies	2015	NASL	8	0	0	0	-		-		8	0
Career total			149	0	15	0	17	0	0	0	181	0

=== International ===
Slovakia national team
Year	Apps	Goals
2002	3	0
2003	0	0
2004	6	0
2005	12	0
2006	7	0
2007	6	0
Total	34	0

Statistics accurate as of match played 17 November 2007

== Career honours ==
Zenit St. Petersburg

- UEFA Cup (1): 2007/08
- UEFA Super Cup (1): 2008
- Russian Premier League
  - Winner (1): 2007
  - Runner-up (1): 2003
  - 3rd place (1): 2009
- Russian Cup (1): 2009/10
- Russian Super Cup (1): 2008
- Russian Premier League Cup (1): 2003

Fort Lauderdale Strikers

- North American Soccer League
  - Runner-up (1): 2014
