= Artyom Pershin =

Russian footballer

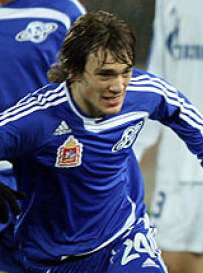

Personal information
- Full name: Artyom Aleksandrovich Pershin
- Date of birth: 6 February 1988 (age 38)
- Height: 1.78 m (5 ft 10 in)
- Position: Midfielder

Senior career*
Years	Team	Apps	(Gls)
2006	FC Smena Moscow		
2006–2010	FC Saturn Moscow Oblast	7	(0)
2008	→ FC Khimki (loan)	7	(0)
2009	→ FC Baltika Kaliningrad (loan)	23	(0)
2010	FC Dynamo Saint Petersburg	9	(0)
2011–2013	FC Volgar Astrakhan	17	(0)
- * Club domestic league appearances and goals as of 8 August 2018

Artyom Aleksandrovich Pershin (Russian: Артём Александрович Першин; born 6 February 1988) is a Russian former footballer. He last played for FC Volgar Astrakhan in the Russian National Football League.
