= Vitali Galysh =

Russian footballer

Personal information
- Full name: Vitali Yuryevich Galysh
- Date of birth: 13 May 1990 (age 36)
- Place of birth: Leningrad, Russian SFSR
- Height: 1.82 m (6 ft 0 in)
- Positions: Winger; forward

Youth career
- Smena St. Petersburg

Senior career*
Years	Team	Apps	(Gls)
2009	FC Togliatti	9	(1)
2010–2011	FC Akademiya Togliatti	36	(10)
2011–2014	FC Ufa	35	(9)
2013–2014	→ FC Yenisey Krasnoyarsk (loan)	20	(3)
2014–2016	FC Yenisey Krasnoyarsk	57	(1)
2016–2017	FC Sokol Saratov	32	(7)
2017–2019	FC Sibir Novosibirsk	60	(8)
2019–2020	FC Sokol Saratov	15	(5)
2020	PFC Dynamo Stavropol	6	(0)

International career
2008	Russia U-18	7	(4)
2009	Russia U-19	7	(4)
- * Club domestic league appearances and goals

Vitali Yuryevich Galysh (Russian: Виталий Юрьевич Галыш; born 13 May 1990) is a Russian former professional football player.

== Club career ==
He made his Russian Football National League debut for FC Ufa on 9 July 2012 in a game against PFC Spartak Nalchik.
