= Marat Dzakhmishev =

Russian footballer

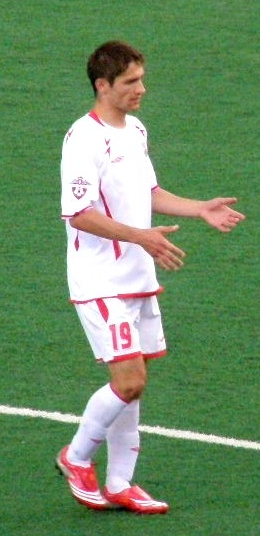

Personal information
- Full name: Marat Sergeyevich Dzakhmishev
- Date of birth: 25 January 1980 (age 46)
- Height: 1.72 m (5 ft 7 1/2 in)
- Positions: Midfielder; forward

Youth career
- RSDYuShOR A. Apsheva Nalchik

Senior career*
| Years | Team | Apps | (Gls) |
| 2001–2003 | PFC Spartak-2 Nalchik | | |
| 2004–2009 | PFC Spartak Nalchik | 74 | (2) |
| 2005–2006 | → FC Spartak-UGP Anapa (loan) | 29 | (6) |
| 2009 | → FC Chernomorets Novorossiysk (loan) | 2 | (0) |
| 2010 | PFC Turan Tovuz | 1 | (0) |
| 2011–2012 | FC Dynamo Stavropol | 32 | (9) |
| 2012 | FC Luch-Energiya Vladivostok | 6 | (0) |
| 2012–2015 | FC Mashuk-KMV Pyatigorsk | 82 | (16) |
| 2015–2016 | PFC Spartak Nalchik | 26 | (3) |
- * Club domestic league appearances and goals

Marat Sergeyevich Dzakhmishev (Russian: Марат Серге́евич Дзахмишев; born 25 January 1980) is a Russian former footballer.
