= Dmitri Sannikov =

Russian footballer

Personal information
- Full name: Dmitri Valeryevich Sannikov
- Date of birth: 19 January 1983 (age 43)
- Height: 1.76 m (5 ft 9 1/2 in)
- Positions: Midfielder; forward

Youth career
- DYuSSh Smena-Zenit

Senior career*
Years	Team	Apps	(Gls)
2000	FC Sokol-D Saratov		
2002–2008	FC Dynamo Bryansk	264	(19)
2009–2010	FC Volgar-Gazprom Astrakhan	53	(4)
2010	FC Salyut Belgorod	11	(0)
2011–2012	FC Avangard Kursk	19	(0)
2012–2013	FC Dynamo Bryansk (amateur)		
2014–2015	FC Zarya Starodub		
- * Club domestic league appearances and goals

Dmitri Valeryevich Sannikov (Russian: Дмитрий Валерьевич Санников; born 19 January 1983) is a former Russian professional football player.

== Club career ==
He played 8 seasons in the Russian Football National League for FC Dynamo Bryansk, FC Volgar-Gazprom Astrakhan and FC Salyut Belgorod.
