= Erik Hagen =

Norwegian footballer (born 1975)

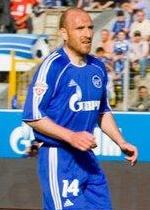
- Hagen in 2007

Personal information
- Full name: Erik Bjørnstad Hagen
- Date of birth: 20 July 1975 (age 51)
- Place of birth: Veme, Norway
- Height: 1.87 m (6 ft 2 in)
- Position: Defender

Youth career
- Jevnaker

Senior career*
Years	Team	Apps	(Gls)
1994–1996	Jevnaker	42	(6)
1996–1997	Liv/Fossekallen	42	(6)
1998–1999	Strømsgodset IF	24	(0)
2000–2004	Vålerenga	112	(4)
2005–2008	Zenit Saint Petersburg	67	(3)
2008	→ Wigan Athletic (loan)	1	(0)
2008–2010	Vålerenga	27	(0)
2010–2011	Hønefoss	20	(1)
2011–2013	Jevnaker	25	(4)
Total		360	(25)

International career
2004–2007	Norway	28	(3)
- * Club domestic league appearances and goals

Erik Bjørnstad Hagen (born 20 July 1975) is a Norwegian former footballer who played as a centre-back in Norway and Russia, as well as for the Norwegian national team, earning 28 caps.

== Career ==
=== Club ===
During his time with Vålerenga, Hagen received the nickname "Panzer" from the club's fans. Amongst other things he created a "hate list" of Norwegian footballers in the club magazine Vål'enga Magasin, containing the likes of Vidar Riseth.

Hagen won the Kniksen Award as Defender of the Year, and as Kniksen of the Year in 2004. The Kniksen award is the highest individual award for a Norwegian footballer.

In December 2004 Hagen was sold to Zenit Saint Petersburg, becoming the first Norwegian footballer to play in Russia. In 2005, he played 28 league matches for Zenit, receiving 12 cautions. In January 2006 he was elected vice-captain by the team.

On 31 January 2008, it was announced that Hagen would be joining Premier League club Wigan Athletic, signing on loan until the end of the English season. However, he only made one appearance for the team, in the away defeat at Portsmouth.

On 28 July 2008, Hagen appeared at the Vålerenga home game against Tromsø, where it was announced he had re-signed for the club until the end of the 2010 season. The return of one of Vålerenga's most popular players was well received with supporters.

During an interview in April 2014, Hagen admitted to bribing a referee in a European match during his time with Zenit Saint Petersburg.

=== International career ===
Hagen made his debut, aged 29, for the Norwegian national team away to Scotland on 9 October 2004. Norway won 1–0.

== Personal life ==
Hagen has a twin brother, Rune Hagen, who also plays professional football. He signed for Vålerenga at the same time as his brother.

== Career statistics ==
=== Club ===
Appearances and goals by club, season and competition
Club	Season	League			National Cup		League Cup		Continental		Other		Total	
Club	Season	Division	Apps	Goals	Apps	Goals	Apps	Goals	Apps	Goals	Apps	Goals	Apps	Goals
Zenit Saint Petersburg	2005	Russian Premier League	28	0	5	0	-		8	0	-		41	0
Zenit Saint Petersburg	2006	Russian Premier League	24	0	5	0	-		5	0	-		34	0
Zenit Saint Petersburg	2007	Russian Premier League	15	0	5	0	-		2	0	-		22	0
Zenit Saint Petersburg	2008	Russian Premier League	0	0	0	0	-		0	0	-		0	0
Zenit Saint Petersburg	Total		67	3	15	0	-	-	15	0	-	-	97	3
Wigan Athletic (loan)	2007–08	Premier League	1	0	0	0	0	0	-		-		1	0
Vålerenga	2008	Tippeligaen	6	0	0	0	-		-		-		6	0
Vålerenga	2009	Tippeligaen	21	0	2	0	-		0	0	-		23	0
Vålerenga	Total		27	0	2	0	-	-	0	0	-	-	29	0
Hønefoss	2010	Tippeligaen	17	0	1	0	-		-		2	0	20	0
Hønefoss	2011	Adeccoligaen	3	0	0	0	-		-		-		3	0
Hønefoss	Total		20	0	1	0	-	-	-	-	2	0	23	0
Career total			115	3	18	0	0	0	15	0	2	0	150	3

=== International ===
Norway national team
Year	Apps	Goals
2004	3	0
2005	9	0
2006	7	1
2007	9	2
Total	28	3

=== International goals ===
#	Date	Venue	Opponent	Score	Result	Competition
1	1 March 2006	Stade Léopold Sédar Senghor, Dakar, Senegal	Senegal	1-2	1-2	Friendly
2	17 October 2007	Asim Ferhatović Hase Stadium, Sarajevo, Bosnia and Herzegovina	Bosnia and Herzegovina	1-0	2-0	UEFA European Championship 2008 Qual.
3	17 November 2007	Ullevaal stadion, Oslo, Norway	Turkey	1-0	1-2	UEFA European Championship 2008 Qual.
