= Sergei Oborin =

Russian footballer and coach

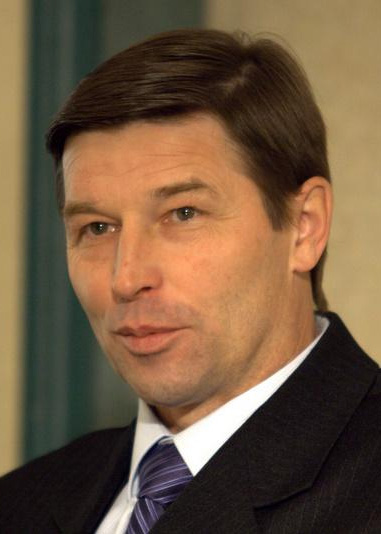

Personal information
- Full name: Sergei Grigoryevich Oborin
- Date of birth: 12 December 1956 (age 69)
- Place of birth: Lysva, Perm Krai, Russian SFSR
- Height: 1.80 m (5 ft 11 in)
- Position: Goalkeeper

Youth career
- SK Lysva

Senior career*
Years	Team	Apps	(Gls)
1977	FC Turbina Naberezhnye Chelny		
1978–1988	FC Zvezda Perm	296	(0)
1989–1991	FC Geolog Tyumen	113	(0)
1992	FC Zvezda Perm	33	(0)
1993	FC Neftekhimik Perm		

Managerial career
- 1995–2006: FC Amkar Perm
- 2007: FC Krylia Sovetov Samara
- 2008: FC Sibir Novosibirsk
- 2019: FC Fakel Voronezh
- * Club domestic league appearances and goals

Sergei Grigoryevich Oborin (Russian: Сергей Григорьевич Оборин; born 12 December 1956) is a Russian professional football coach and a former player.

== Coaching career ==
On 16 October 2019, he left FC Fakel Voronezh by mutual consent after the club gained 3 draws and 3 losses in last 6 league games and dropped to last place in the FNL table.
