= Konstantin Zuyev =

Russian footballer

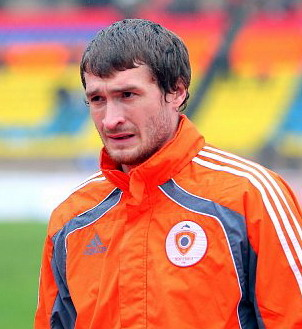

Personal information
- Full name: Konstantin Georgiyevich Zuyev
- Date of birth: 17 November 1981 (age 44)
- Place of birth: Pavlodar, Kazakh SSR
- Height: 1.87 m (6 ft 1 1/2 in)
- Position: Midfielder

Senior career*
Years	Team	Apps	(Gls)
1999	FC Zhemchuzhina-2 Sochi	29	(1)
2000	FC Tsentr-R-Kavkaz Krasnodar		
2001	FC Chernomorets Novorossiysk	17	(0)
2002	FC Saturn-RenTV Ramenskoye	0	(0)
2003	FC Dynamo Makhachkala	10	(1)
2003	FC Lukoil Chelyabinsk	8	(0)
2004	FC Kuban Krasnodar	0	(0)
2004	FC Dynamo Makhachkala	16	(0)
2005–2007	FC Kuban Krasnodar	72	(2)
2008	FC Rostov	28	(2)
2009	FC Anzhi Makhachkala	12	(0)
2009–2011	FC Zhemchuzhina-Sochi	26	(1)
2011	FC Nizhny Novgorod	11	(1)
2012	FC SKA-Energiya Khabarovsk	15	(0)
2013	FC Tyumen	5	(1)
- * Club domestic league appearances and goals as of 19:25, 24 June 2013 (UTC)

Konstantin Georgiyevich Zuyev (Russian: Константин Георгиевич Зуев; born 17 November 1981) is a Russian former professional footballer.

== Club career ==
He made his debut in the Russian Premier League in 2001 for FC Chernomorets Novorossiysk. He played one game in the UEFA Cup 2001–02 for FC Chernomorets Novorossiysk.
