= Alexander Petrov (footballer, born 1990) =

Russian footballer

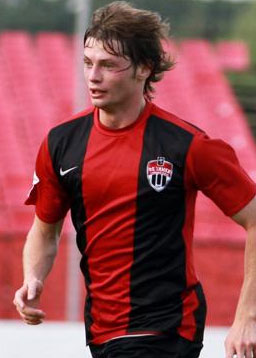

Personal information
- Full name: Alexander Nikolayevich Petrov
- Date of birth: 20 January 1990 (age 36)
- Place of birth: Leningrad, Russian SFSR
- Height: 1.73 m (5 ft 8 in)
- Position: Midfielder

Youth career
- FC Zenit Saint Petersburg
- 2005–2006: Akademika Moscow

Senior career*
Years	Team	Apps	(Gls)
2007–2009	FC Zenit Saint Petersburg	0	(0)
2010	FC Khimki	19	(1)
2011–2012	FC Piter Saint Petersburg (amateur)		
2012	FC Lesgaftovets Saint Petersburg		
2012	FC Metallurg-Oskol Stary Oskol	18	(1)
2013	FC Rus Saint Petersburg	27	(2)
2014	FC Taganrog	21	(1)
2015	FC Zvezda Saint Petersburg (amateur)		
- * Club domestic league appearances and goals

Alexander Nikolayevich Petrov (Russian: Александр Николаевич Петров; born 20 January 1990) is a former Russian professional football player.

== Club career ==
He made his professional debut in the Russian Football National League on 31 March 2010 for FC Khimki in a game against FC Avangard Kursk. That was his only season in the FNL.

In February 2012, Petrov is on trial in Bulgarian side Botev Plovdiv.
