= Ivan Lapin =

Russian footballer

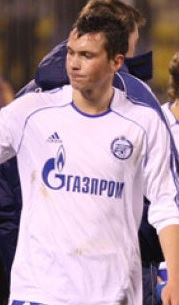
- Ivan Lapin in 2007

Personal information
- Full name: Ivan Aleksandrovich Lapin
- Date of birth: 8 May 1988 (age 38)
- Place of birth: Zelenograd, Moscow, Soviet Union
- Height: 1.89 m (6 ft 2 in)
- Position: Defender

Senior career*
Years	Team	Apps	(Gls)
2006	FC Sportakademklub Moscow	26	(0)
2007–2010	FC Zenit Saint Petersburg	0	(0)
2009	→ FC Rostov (loan)	3	(0)
2010	→ PFC Spartak Nalchik (loan)	0	(0)
2011–2013	FC Baltika Kaliningrad	13	(0)
- * Club domestic league appearances and goals

Ivan Aleksandrovich Lapin (Russian: Иван Александрович Лапин; born 8 May 1988) is a Russian former football defender.

== Career ==
An Akademika football school graduate, he started playing for Zenit Reserves in 2007. He played once for Zenit in the Russian Cup. He had a contract with Zenit until 31 December 2009. On 13 March 2009 FC Zenit Saint Petersburg the young defender went on loan to FC Rostov. He returned at the end of the season, but did not get into the first team. He joined Baltika Kaliningrad for the 2011–12 season.
