= Pavel Zubov =

Russian footballer

Personal information
- Full name: Pavel Aleksandrovich Zubov
- Date of birth: 4 February 1988 (age 38)
- Place of birth: Omsk, Russian SFSR
- Height: 1.83 m (6 ft 0 in)
- Position: Midfielder

Youth career
- Molniya Omsk
- FC Irtysh Omsk
- FC Spartak Moscow

Senior career*
| Years | Team | Apps | (Gls) |
| 2006 | FC Spartak Moscow | 0 | (0) |
| 2006 | FC Sportakademklub Moscow | 13 | (2) |
| 2007–2009 | FC Zenit Saint Petersburg | 0 | (0) |
| 2009 | → FC Smena-Zenit Saint Petersburg (loan) | 20 | (1) |
| 2010 | FC Irtysh Omsk | 13 | (0) |
| 2011 | FK Žalgiris Vilnius | 9 | (0) |
| 2011–2014 | FC Irtysh Omsk | 45 | (1) |

Managerial career
- 2021–2022: FC Irtysh Omsk (assistant)
- 2022–2023: FC Yadro Saint Petersburg (assistant)
- 2023: FC Dynamo Saint Petersburg (assistant)
- 2025–2026: FC Zenit Penza
- * Club domestic league appearances and goals

Pavel Aleksandrovich Zubov (Russian: Павел Александрович Зубов; born 4 February 1988) is a Russian professional football coach and a former player.

== Club career ==
He played in the Russian Football National League for FC Irtysh Omsk in 2010.
