= Sergei Gorbunov (footballer) =

Russian footballer

Personal information
- Full name: Sergei Grigoryevich Gorbunov
- Date of birth: 5 April 1987 (age 39)
- Place of birth: Bryansk, Russian SFSR
- Height: 1.72 m (5 ft 7 1/2 in)
- Position: Defender

Senior career*
Years	Team	Apps	(Gls)
2005	FC Lokomotiv Moscow	0	(0)
2005–2006	FC Sportakademklub Moscow	30	(1)
2007–2009	FC Zenit Saint Petersburg	0	(0)
2008	→ FC Sportakademklub Moscow (loan)	12	(0)
2008	→ FC Mashuk-KMV Pyatigorsk (loan)	18	(0)
2009	→ FC Smena-Zenit Saint Petersburg (loan)	31	(4)
2010	FC Neftekhimik Nizhnekamsk	0	(0)
2010–2011	JK Sillamäe Kalev	25	(1)
2011–2014	FC Zenit Penza	69	(2)
2014–2015	FC Dynamo Bryansk	29	(0)
2015–2016	FC Dynamo St. Petersburg	22	(0)
- * Club domestic league appearances and goals

Sergei Grigoryevich Gorbunov (Russian: Серге́й Григорьевич Горбунов; born 5 April 1987) is a former Russian professional football player.

== Club career ==
He played in the Russian Football National League for FC Sportakademklub Moscow and FC Mashuk-KMV Pyatigorsk in 2008.
