= Yuri Lebedev (footballer) =

Russian footballer

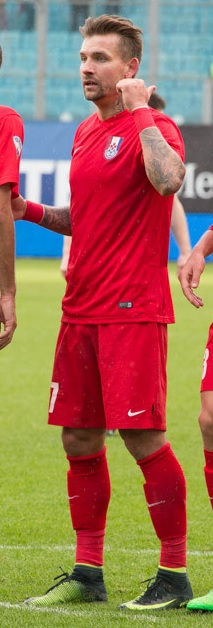
- Lebedev with Mordovia in 2017

Personal information
- Full name: Yuri Yuryevich Lebedev
- Date of birth: 21 January 1987 (age 39)
- Place of birth: Leningrad, Soviet Union
- Height: 1.83 m (6 ft 0 in)
- Position: Defender

Youth career
- FC Kirovets St. Petersburg
- –2004: DYuSSh Smena-Zenit
- 2005–2007: FC Zenit St. Petersburg

Senior career*
Years	Team	Apps	(Gls)
2007–2009	FC Zenit St. Petersburg	1	(0)
2008–2009	→ FC Nosta Novotroitsk (loan)	55	(4)
2009	→ FC Baltika Kaliningrad (loan)	11	(1)
2010	FC Baltika Kaliningrad	20	(0)
2011	PFC Spartak Nalchik	20	(0)
2012	FC Baltika Kaliningrad	10	(0)
2012	FC Petrotrest St. Petersburg	7	(0)
2013	FC Salyut Belgorod	14	(0)
2014	FC Dynamo St. Petersburg	7	(0)
2014–2015	FC Luch-Energiya Vladivostok	14	(0)
2016	FC Baltika Kaliningrad	12	(1)
2016–2019	FC Mordovia Saransk	86	(0)
2019	FC Nizhny Novgorod	15	(0)
2020	FC Mashuk-KMV Pyatigorsk	14	(0)
2021–2022	FK Jonava		
2022–2023	FC Mashuk-KMV Pyatigorsk	9	(0)

International career
2005	Russia U-19	5	(1)
2007–2008	Russia U-21	8	(0)
- * Club domestic league appearances and goals

Yuri Yuryevich Lebedev (Russian: Юрий Юрьевич Лебедев; born 21 January 1987) is a Russian former football defender.

== Career ==
Lebedev began his career at FC Kirovets St. Petersburg, then joined DYuSSh Smena-Zenit, before in 2005 he was scouted by Zenit, for which he played his first game on 15 July 2007 against FC Rostov.
