= Spartak Stadium (Nalchik) =

Sports venue in Nalchik, Russia

Coordinates: 43°28′10″N 43°35′25″E

Spartak Stadium is a multi-purpose stadium in Nalchik, Russia. It is used mostly for football matches and is the home ground of PFC Spartak Nalchik. Also it is the home stadium of rugby union club Nart. The stadium holds 14,149 seats.
