= Oleg Dineyev =

Russian footballer

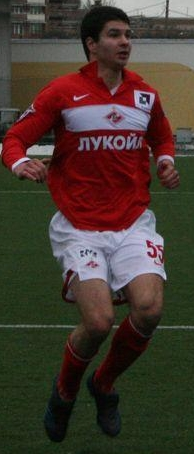

Personal information
- Full name: Oleg Aleksandrovich Dineyev
- Date of birth: 30 October 1987 (age 39)
- Place of birth: Moscow, Soviet Union
- Height: 1.76 m (5 ft 9 in)
- Position: Midfielder

Senior career*
Years	Team	Apps	(Gls)
2007–2010	FC Spartak Moscow	2	(0)
2007	→ FC Shinnik Yaroslavl (loan)	9	(0)
2008	→ FC Khimki (loan)	12	(0)
2010	FC Dynamo Bryansk	1	(0)
2011	FC Salyut Belgorod	4	(0)

International career
2006	Russia U-19	1	(0)
2007	Russia U-21	1	(0)
- * Club domestic league appearances and goals

Oleg Aleksandrovich Dineyev (Russian: Олег Александрович Динеев; born 30 October 1987) is a Russian former footballer.
