= Yegor Okorokov =

Russian footballer

Personal information
- Full name: Yegor Anatolyevich Okorokov
- Date of birth: 18 April 1989 (age 37)
- Place of birth: Kaunas, Lithuanian SSR
- Height: 1.78 m (5 ft 10 in)
- Position: Midfielder

Senior career*
Years	Team	Apps	(Gls)
2004–2005	FC Nika-Stroy-Petrotrest Saint Petersburg (amateur)		
2006–2008	FC Zenit Saint Petersburg	0	(0)
2009	FC Smena-Zenit Saint Petersburg	13	(1)
2010	FC Dynamo Saint Petersburg	7	(0)
2011	FC Petrotrest Saint Petersburg	17	(3)
2012	FC Piter Saint Petersburg (amateur)		
2012	FC Metallurg-Oskol Stary Oskol	19	(1)
2013	FC Lokomotiv Liski	9	(0)
2013–2014	FC Oryol	9	(0)
2015–2018	FC Atom Novovoronezh (amateur)		
2019–2020	FC Rubin Voronezh (amateur)		
- * Club domestic league appearances and goals

Yegor Anatolyevich Okorokov (Russian: Егор Анатольевич Окороков; born 18 April 1989) is a Russian former professional football player.

== Club career ==
He made his professional debut for FC Zenit Saint Petersburg on 31 October 2007 in the Russian Cup game against FC Tom Tomsk.

He played in the Russian Football National League for FC Dynamo Saint Petersburg in 2010.
