= 2011–12 FC Zenit Saint Petersburg season =

Zenit Saint Petersburg
2011–12 season
- Chairman: Aleksandr Dyukov
- Manager: Luciano Spalletti
- Stadium: Petrovsky Stadium
- Russian Premier League: 1st
- Russian Cup: Quarter-finals
- Russian Super Cup: Runners-up
- UEFA Champions League: Round of 16
- Top goalscorer: League: Aleksandr Kerzhakov (23); All: Aleksandr Kerzhakov (24)
- Highest home attendance: 21,400 vs Spartak Moscow, RPL; 30 May 2012
- Lowest home attendance: 18,000 vs Anzhi Makhachkala, RPL; 20 March 2012
Home colours	Away colours

The 2011–12 FC Zenit Saint Petersburg season was the 16th straight season that the club will play in the Russian Premier League, the highest tier of football in Russia. The club were the defending champions of both the Russian Premier League and the Russian Cup.

Internationally, the club participated in the 2011–12 UEFA Champions League, entering the competition in the group stage as a result of qualifying for the competition as the first place team from Russia.

== Squad ==
As of 21 October 2011. FC Zenit Saint Petersburg 2011–12

No.	Name	Nationality	Position (s)	Date of Birth (Age)	Height (m)	Weight (kg)	Signed From
Goalkeepers
16	Vyacheslav Malafeev	(Russia)	GK	March 4, 1979 (age 47)	1.85	76	Youth System
22	Dmitri Borodin	(Russia)	GK	October 8, 1977 (age 49)	1.88	82	Youth System
30	Yuri Zhevnov	(Belarus)	GK	April 17, 1981 (age 45)	1.80	85	FC Moscow
Defenders
2	Aleksandr Anyukov (C)	(Russia)	RB	September 28, 1982 (age 44)	1.78	67	Krylia Sovetov
3	Bruno Alves	(Portugal)	CB	November 27, 1981 (age 44)	1.89	83	(Portugal) Porto
4	Domenico Criscito	(Italy)	LB	December 30, 1986 (age 39)	1.83	75	(Italy) Genoa
6	Nicolas Lombaerts	(Belgium)	CB / LB	March 20, 1985 (age 41)	1.88	83	(Belgium) Gent
14	Tomáš Hubočan	(Slovakia)	LB / RB / CB	September 17, 1985 (age 41)	1.83	74	(Slovakia) Žilina
24	Aleksandar Luković	(Serbia)	LB / CB	October 23, 1982 (age 44)	1.85	83	(Italy) Udinese
28	Michael Lumb	(Denmark)	LB	January 9, 1988 (age 38)	1.77	70	(Denmark) AGF Aarhus
50	Igor Cheminava	(Russia)	CB	March 23, 1991 (age 35)	1.86	76	Youth System
Midfielders
10	Danny	(Portugal)	AM	August 7, 1983 (age 43)	1.78	70	Dynamo Moscow
15	Roman Shirokov	(Russia)	CM / AM / DM	July 6, 1981 (age 45)	1.87	83	Khimki
17	Alessandro Rosina	(Italy)	AM	January 31, 1984 (age 42)	1.68	65	(Italy) Torino
18	Konstantin Zyryanov	(Russia)	LM / CM	October 5, 1977 (age 49)	1.76	72	Torpedo Moscow
20	Viktor Fayzulin	(Russia)	CM	April 22, 1986 (age 40)	1.76	72	Spartak Nalchik
23	Szabolcs Huszti	(Hungary)	RM / LM	April 18, 1983 (age 43)	1.73	73	(Germany) Hannover 96
25	Sergei Semak	(Russia)	DM / CM	February 27, 1976 (age 50)	1.78	73	Rubin Kazan
27	Igor Denisov	(Russia)	CM / DM	May 17, 1984 (age 42)	1.76	70	Youth System
34	Vladimir Bystrov	(Russia)	RM	January 31, 1984 (age 42)	1.77	73	Youth System
57	Aleksei Ionov	(Russia)	AM / CM	February 18, 1989 (age 37)	1.77	68	Youth System
Forwards
8	Danko Lazović	(Serbia)	ST / LW	May 17, 1983 (age 43)	1.84	80	(Netherlands) PSV
9	Aleksandr Bukharov	(Russia)	CF / ST	March 12, 1985 (age 41)	1.93	92	Rubin Kazan
11	Aleksandr Kerzhakov	(Russia)	ST	November 27, 1982 (age 43)	1.76	76	Dynamo Moscow

== Season events ==
=== Pre-season ===
Following the club's double in manager Luciano Spalletti's first season, Zenit made several moves in the winter. First, the loan deal of former Zenit youth player Anton Sosnin to Krylia Sovetov Samara was made permanent, and Yevgeni Starikov's loan to Tom Tomsk was renewed. Second, after a very successful 14-goal season with Tom Tomsk and Rubin Kazan, striker Sergei Kornilenko made his return to the club. On 14 January, Croatian defender Ivica Križanac, who had been with the club for the past six seasons and appeared in 100 Russian Premier League matches, was released by the club prior to his contract expiring in the summer of 2011.

On 15 January, the club departed for Dubai with 22 players for the first pre-season training session. However, 19-year-old striker Maksim Kanunnikov, who was a popular first-team substitute early in 2010 prior to the arrival of Aleksandr Bukharov, did not make the trip and was loaned to Tom Tomsk on 17 January until July 2012. The club also hosted the annual Commonwealth of Independent States Cup and were represented by youth team players. After qualifying for the knock-out round, Zenit defeated HJK Helsinki 2–1 in the quarterfinal thanks to a double by 19-year-old Stanislav Matyash before being eliminated by eventual champions Inter Baku in the semifinal.

On 29 January, Italian Alessandro Rosina was loaned to Serie A side Cesena until July 2011. On the final day of the English transfer window, striker Sergei Kornilenko was once again sent on loan, this time to Blackpool for the remainder of the 2010–11 Premier League season.

==== Match World Cup ====
In Dubai, the club participated in the 2011 Match World Cup, a friendly tournament including league winners from Europe and Asia. Zenit were drawn alongside defending Gambrunus liga champions Sparta Prague and defending Hazfi Cup winners, Persepolis of Iran. In the opening match against Sparta Prague, Zenit was fueled by a first-minute strike by Aleksandr Kerzhakov as the blue-whites cruised to a 3–0 victory.

Two days later, Kerzhakov had Zenit off and running against Persepolis with a seventh-minute goal, and 34-year-old Sergei Semak added the finishing touches in the second half with an open-net goal. With six points earned from two group stage matches, Zenit earned a date with Asia's Club of the 20th Century, Al-Hilal in the championship.

After a first half stalemate at the Al-Maktoum Stadium, Szabolcs Huszti finally broke the match open with a 63rd-minute strike. But Al-Hilal would not go quietly. Zenit substitute Danko Lazović was sent off in extra time and Romanian Mirel Rădoi scored in the 93rd minute for Al-Hilal to send the match to penalties. From the spot kicks, the Arabian side were perfect from all four shooters, while both Roman Shirokov and Fernando Meira were off the mark for Zenit, eventually falling 4–1 on penalties.

=== March ===
Only days before the start of the new season, Zenit signed 19-year-old Chilean left-back Nicolás Peñailillo on a loan deal from Everton de Viña del Mar.

Zenit opened their 2011–12 Russian Premier League campaign on March 13 against Terek Grozny, where Serbian Danko Lazović delivered the only goal of the match in a 1–0 Zenit victory. It took only 14 minutes for Danny to pick out Lazović with a cross and goalkeeper Vyacheslav Malafeev made several excellent saves to deny new Terek manager Ruud Gullit his first points in Russia. After falling to Twente in the Europa League, the club was hit with tragedy on a personal level when they learned of the death of Malafeev's wife Marina, who was killed in a car crash on 17 March. Three days later, the club played its first home match of the season against an inspired Anzhi Makhachkala side led by former Brazilian international and Real Madrid left-back Roberto Carlos. Zenit midfielder Roman Shirokov opened the scoring just four minutes in and then just seconds before half-time, Lazović scored his second of the season to put the sine-byelo-goluboy up 2–0, a scoreline that would hold up for Luciano Spalletti's second victory of the year.

==== Roberto Carlos incident ====
Following the match on 20 March, Brazilian media reported that Anzhi captain Roberto Carlos was racially abused by a Zenit fan as the two teams took the field. A picture surfaced that revealed the fan offering a banana to the 37-year-old as he entered the pitch, however Russian journalist Boris Bogdanov argued against the allegations of racism, citing that the picture was taken at an "unfavorable angle" and it could not be known for sure if his intention was to offend. Even though there had been incidents of banana-throwing in Saint Petersburg before, there were none during the Anzhi match or any other sort of incident. Roberto Carlos, who initially stated, "In my 37 years I have seen everything, I'm not going to be upset after seeing a banana", and that it didn't make him feel uncomfortable, later demanded action from the Russian Football Union (RFU).

On 7 April, the RFU fined Zenit €7,400 and the club claimed it had banned the offending fan for life.

=== April ===
After a perfect start to the new season, the club travelled to Nalchik to face a Spartak Nalchuk side that had exceeded all expectations by finishing 6th in 2010 and once more, Sergei Tashuev's squad proved to be worthy competition. Despite an early strike from Aleksandr Kerzhakov, Spartak leveled the score on 60 minutes. Danko Lazović then scored his third goal in three matches in the 80th minute, which appeared to be the winner before 25-year-old Roman Kontsedalov brought the home side back on even terms again. For the sixth time in seven league matches, Spartak had scored multiple goals against Zenit and Spalletti's side left with a 2–2 draw.

On 10 April, Zenit hoste CSKA Moscow in a highly anticipated duel at the Petrovsky Stadium. The match ended 1–1, however the official result awarded a 3–0 victory to CSKA. According to the league regulations, every team has to put at least one player with a Russian citizenship born in 1990 or later on their game roster in every game (even if the player in question stays on the bench). If there is no such player or players, the team guilty is punished by the victory being awarded to their opponent and a fine. In the game Zenit did not have such a player in their lineup – the youngest player was born in 1989. After the game, RFU president Sergei Fursenko said that Zenit would likely be awarded a defeat for breaking the regulations. Zenit manager Luciano Spalletti said after the game that they did this intentionally, as they were told it is punishable by a fine only, and the team was ready to pay the fine. They have done the same thing in the 2010 season and fine was the only punishment. However, the regulations were updated in December 2010, and the current exact language of Article 109 of the Disciplinary Regulations of the RFU states it is punishable by "a defeat awarded and a fine", not "a defeat awarded or a fine". Zenit was awarded a defeat by the RFU on 13 April. Zenit removed Vladislav Radimov, who as team director was responsible for filing the game roster with the league, from his position to the reserve team's assistant coach position, with a reduction in salary. Zenit's lawyer was punished by the club by having his bonus cancelled.

Following the RFU decision, the Premier League further decided that the goals scored by Mark González and Konstantin Zyryanov would not count for their scoring totals, but the yellow cards received in the game would count for disciplinary purposes.

Following the events of 10 April, Zenit closed out the month strong with resounding victories over Amkar Perm (3–1) and Krylia Sovetov (3–0). After a double against Krylia, Danko Lazović had run his scoring total to five goals in six matches.

=== May ===
Zenit hit a brick wall on their first trip to Krasnodar, failing to score against the newly promoted Bulls. The club could not pick up full points in either of their next two matches either, drawing with Rubin Kazan and Lokomotiv Moscow. An early low point then came on 21 May as the club traveled to Tomsk. Tom Tomsk took an early lead off former Zenit youth star Yevgeni Starikov's 37th-minute goal. Another youngster, Aleksei Ionov, leveled the score for Zenit just four minutes later, but it was ultimately 23-year-old Pavel Golyshev who had the last laugh as he secured a 2–1 victory for Tomsk. The tally was Golyshev's sixth of the season.

To finish off the month before a week of international break, Zenit would have to face arch-rival Spartak Moscow. After a heated first half-hour of play, it was Lazović to the rescue once more, putting Zenit ahead in the 37th minute with a clever penalty. The goal seemed to open the game up considerably and Aleksandr Kerzhakov netted a double in the second half, with the first of the two coming off an artful one-time shot.

=== June ===
After the club's most resounding victory of the season on 14 June, a 4–0 win over Rostov, Portuguese midfielder Danny signed a contract extension to remain with Zenit until 2015.

Several days later, following the club's 2–0 victory over Volga Nizhny Novgorod, star striker Danko Lazović was tasered by police for giving his jersey to a fan in the crowd. "I just went to give my jersey to the fans after the match, when a police officer appeared behind me and tasered me in the back with his electric shocker. I don't know why that happened. Maybe he thought that I was one of the fans", explained Lazović on Zenit's official website, while the club itself vented its anger against the actions of the police.

Just after entering the Russian Premier League's one-month summer break, the club signed Italian left-back Domenico Criscito from Genoa for a sum of €11 million.

== Statistics ==
=== Field ===
As of 26 June 2011

No.	Pos.	Name	League					Cup				Super Cup				Europe				Total				Discipline	
No.	Pos.	Name	App	Min	Goal	A	PTS	App	Min	Goal	A	App	Min	Goal	A	App	Min	Goal	A	App	Min	Goal	A	Yellow card	Red card
2	DF	(Russia) Aleksandr Anyukov	25	2224	1	4	5	1	75	0	0	1	90	0	0	3	270	0	0	30	2659	1	4	5	0
3	DF	(Portugal) Bruno Alves	26	2340	0	0	0	2	180	0	0	1	90	0	0	2	166	0	0	31	2776	0	0	9	1
5	DF	(Portugal) Fernando Meira	1	1	0	0	0	0	0	0	0	1	90	0	0	0	0	0	0	2	91	0	0	0	0
6	DF	(Belgium) Nicolas Lombaerts	27	2305	1	1	2	1	90	0	0	0	0	0	0	4	360	1	0	32	2755	2	1	5	0
8	FW	(Serbia) Danko Lazović	26	1580	11	4	15	2	151	0	0	1	55	0	0	3	34	0	0	32	1820	11	4	6	0
9	FW	(Russia) Aleksandr Bukharov	13	446	2	0	2	0	0	0	0	0	0	0	0	0	0	0	0	13	446	2	0	2	0
10	MF	(Portugal) Danny	13	987	2	4	6	0	0	0	0	1	90	0	0	0	0	0	0	14	1077	2	4	3	0
11	FW	(Russia) Aleksandr Kerzhakov	12	964	7	4	11	0	0	0	0	0	0	0	0	0	0	0	0	12	964	7	4	2	0
14	DF	(Slovakia) Tomáš Hubočan	9	753	0	0	0	0	0	0	0	0	0	0	0	0	0	0	0	9	753	0	0	3	0
15	MF	(Russia) Roman Shirokov	3	270	1	0	1	0	0	0	0	1	90	0	0	0	0	0	0	4	360	1	0	0	0
18	MF	(Russia) Konstantin Zyryanov	15	1209	1	0	1	0	0	0	0	1	90	0	0	0	0	0	0	16	1299	1	0	2	0
20	MF	(Russia) Viktor Fayzulin	11	433	0	0	0	0	0	0	0	0	0	0	0	0	0	0	0	11	433	0	0	1	1
23	MF	(Hungary) Szabolcs Huszti	11	351	1	1	2	0	0	0	0	1	9	0	0	0	0	0	0	12	360	1	1	1	0
24	DF	(Serbia) Aleksandar Luković	9	810	0	0	0	0	0	0	0	1	90	0	0	0	0	0	0	10	900	0	0	4	0
25	MF	(Russia) Sergei Semak	6	433	0	1	1	0	0	0	0	1	82	0	1	0	0	0	0	7	515	0	2	0	0
27	MF	(Russia) Igor Denisov	13	1170	0	1	1	0	0	0	0	1	90	0	0	0	0	0	0	14	1260	0	1	2	0
50	DF	(Russia) Igor Cheminava	2	180	0	0	0	0	0	0	0	0	0	0	0	0	0	0	0	2	180	0	0	1	0
57	MF	(Russia) Aleksei Ionov	15	867	3	0	3	0	0	0	0	1	36	1	0	0	0	0	0	16	903	4	0	1	0
98	MF	(Russia) Sergei Petrov	2	19	0	0	0	0	0	0	0	0	0	0	0	0	0	0	0	2	19	0	0	0	0

=== Goalkeeping ===
As of 26 June 2011

No.	Pos.	Name	League					Cup				Super Cup				Europe				Total				Discipline	
No.	Pos.	Name	App	Min	GA	AVG	SV	App	Min	GA	SV	App	Min	GA	SV	App	Min	GA	SV	App	Min	GA	SV	Yellow card	Red card
16	GK	(Russia) Vyacheslav Malafeev	15	1316	8	0.533	47	0	0	0	0	1	90	0	0	0	0	0	0	16	1406	8	47	1	0
30	GK	(Belarus) Yuri Zhevnov	1	34	1	1.000	1	0	0	0	0	0	0	0	0	0	0	0	0	1	34	1	1	0	0

== Transfers ==
=== Ownership ===
==== In ====
Date	Pos.	Name	From	Fee
1 January 2011	ST	(Belarus) Sergei Kornilenko	(Russia) Rubin Kazan	End of Loan
27 June 2011	LB	(Italy) Domenico Criscito	(Italy) Genoa	€11,000,000

==== Out ====
Date	Pos.	Name	To	Fee
10 December 2010	CM	(Russia) Anton Sosnin	(Russia) Krylia Sovetov Samara	Undisclosed
1 January 2011	LB	(Russia) Aslan Dudiyev	(Russia) Akademiya Tolyatti	End of Loan
14 January 2011	CB	(Croatia) Ivica Križanac	(Croatia) Split	Released

=== Loan ===
==== In ====
Date	Pos.	Name	From	Fee
9 March 2011	LB	(Chile) Nicolás Peñailillo	(Chile) Everton	Undisclosed Loan

==== Out ====
Date	Pos.	Name	To	Fee
29 November 2010	ST	(United States) Yevgeni Starikov	(Russia) Tom Tomsk	Undisclosed Loan
17 January 2011	ST	(Russia) Maksim Kanunnikov	(Russia) Tom Tomsk	Undisclosed Loan
29 January 2011	AM	(Italy) Alessandro Rosina	(Italy) Cesena	Undisclosed Loan
31 January 2011	ST	(Belarus) Sergei Kornilenko	(England) Blackpool	Undisclosed Loan

For recent transfers, see List of Russian football transfers winter 2010–11 and List of Russian football transfers summer 2011

== Matches ==
=== Russian Premier League ===
13 March 2011 1	Terek Grozny	0–1	Zenit	Grozny, Chechnya
18:30 MST	Rodrigo Tiuí (yellow card) 90'	Report	Lazović 14', (yellow card) 74'; Huszti (yellow card) 82'; Zyryanov (yellow card) 84'	Stadium: Sultan Bilimkhanov Stadium; Attendance: 9,700; Referee: Aleksey Nikolaev

20 March 2011 2	Zenit	2–0	Anzhi Makhachkala	Saint Petersburg
16:30 MST	Shirokov 6'; Ionov (yellow card) 37'; Lazović 45'	Report		Stadium: Petrovsky Stadium; Attendance: 18,000; Referee: Aleksey Eskov

3 April 2011 3	Spartak Nalchik	2–2	Zenit	Nalchik, Kabardino-Balkaria
11:00 MST	Jovanović (yellow card) 41' (yellow-red card) 67'; Zahirović 60'; Kontsedalov 88'	Report	Kerzhakov 7', (yellow card) 34'; Luković (yellow card) 26'; Lazović (yellow card) 56', (goal) 80'; Alves (yellow card) 62'; Danny (yellow card) 74'; Lombaerts (yellow card) 78'	Stadium: Spartak Stadium; Attendance: 5,800; Referee: Maksim Layushkin

10 April 2011 4	Zenit	0 – 3 Awarded	CSKA Moscow	Saint Petersburg
15:30		Report		Stadium: Petrovsky Stadium; Attendance: 21,400; Referee: Igor Egorov
Note: The match originally ended 1–1 but later the FA awarded a 3–0 win to CSKA due to Zenit not including a player born after 1 January 1990 in the squad for the game.

17 April 2011 5	Amkar Perm	1–3	Zenit	Perm, Perm Krai
12:15 MST	Sirakov (yellow card) 4'; Novaković (yellow card) 19'; Cherenchikov (yellow card) 36'; Mikhalyov 90'	Report	Ionov 20'; Danny 24'; Luković (yellow card) 38'; Bukharov 80'	Stadium: Zvezda Stadium; Attendance: 12,700; Referee: Alexey Nikolaev

24 April 2011 6	Zenit	3–0	Krylia Sovetov	Saint Petersburg
16:45 MST	Kerzhakov 11'; Hubočan (yellow card) 25'; Zyryanov (yellow card) 52'; Lazović 81', 86'	Report	Priyomov (yellow card) 37'	Stadium: Petrovsky Stadium; Attendance: 19,650; Referee: Sergey Karasev

1 May 2011 7	Krasnodar	0–0	Zenit	Krasnodar, Krasnodar Krai
16:30 MST	Gogniyev (yellow card) 12'; Tubić (yellow card) 34'; Martynovich (yellow card) 45'	Report	Anyukov (yellow card) 70'; Danny (yellow card) 89'; Lazović (yellow card) 90'	Stadium: Kuban Stadium; Attendance: 15,000; Referee: Aleksey Eskov

8 May 2011 8	Zenit	1–1	Lokomotiv Moscow	Saint Petersburg
20:30 MST	Lombaerts (yellow card) 21'; Lazović (yellow card) 51', (goal) 65' (pen.)	Report	Guilherme (yellow card) 35'; Yanbaev (yellow card) 43'; Ďurica (yellow card) 47'; Maicon (yellow card) 51', (goal) 68'; Ivanov (yellow card) 51'; Ibričić (yellow card) 57'	Stadium: Petrovsky Stadium; Attendance: 21,400; Referee: Igor Egorov

14 May 2011 9	Zenit	2–2	Rubin Kazan	Saint Petersburg
16:00 MST	Danny 9'; Anyukov (yellow card) 11'; Bukharov (yellow card) 51'; Kerzhakov 71'	Report	Karadeniz 19'; Medvedev 31'	Stadium: Petrovsky Stadium; Attendance: 19,500; Referee: Yuri Baskakov

21 May 2011 10	Tom Tomsk	2–1	Zenit	Tomsk, Tomsk Oblast
11:45 MST	Starikov 37'; Golyshev 52'	Report	Lazović (yellow card) 25'; Ionov 41'; Anyukov (yellow card) 69'; Alves (yellow card) 75'	Stadium: Trud Stadium; Attendance: 11,000; Referee: Almir Kayumov

30 May 2011 11	Zenit	3–0	Spartak Moscow	Saint Petersburg
16:00 MST	Kerzhakov (yellow card) 11', (goal) 67', 88'; Hubočan (yellow card) 26'; Lazović 37' (pen.); Fayzulin (yellow card) 81'; Alves (yellow card) 84'	Report	Kudryashov (yellow card) 36'; Suchý (yellow card) 41'	Stadium: Petrovsky Stadium; Attendance: 21,400; Referee: Igor Egorov

10 June 2011 12	Dynamo Moscow	1–1	Zenit	Moscow
20:00 MST	Semshov (yellow card) 15'; Kokorin (yellow card) 40'; Wilkshire (yellow card) 56'; Voronin (yellow card) 68'; Sapeta (yellow card) 76'; Samedov (yellow card) 81', (goal) 90'	Report	Luković (yellow card) 14'; Hubočan (yellow card) 59'; Lombaerts (yellow card) 70'; Fayzulin (yellow card) 73'; Lazović 82'; Malafeev (yellow card) 90'	Stadium: Arena Khimki; Attendance: 13,734; Referee: Igor Egorov

14 June 2011 13	Zenit	4–0	Rostov	Saint Petersburg
18:45 MST	Ionov 1'; Lazović 40'; Huszti 72'; Bukharov 90'	Report	Khokhlov (yellow card) 20'; Adamov (yellow card) 65'; Khagush (yellow card) 79'	Stadium: Petrovsky Stadium; Attendance: 15,081; Referee: Almir Kayumov

18 June 2011 14	Volga	0–2	Zenit	Nizhny Novgorod, Nizhny Novgorod Oblast
18:45 MST	Bendz (yellow card) 13'; Gogua (yellow card) 72'; Getigezhev (yellow card) 90'	Report	Kerzhakov 9', 19'; Cheminava (yellow card) 82'	Stadium: Lokomotiv Stadium; Attendance: 17,800; Referee: Aleksei Eskov

22 June 2011 15	Zenit	1–0	Kuban Krasnodar	Saint Petersburg
21:00 MST	Luković (yellow card) 25'; Zyryanov 35'	Report	A. Kozlov (yellow card) 20'	Stadium: Petrovsky Stadium; Attendance: 20,200; Referee: Mikhail Vilkov

26 June 2011 16	Zenit	0–0	Terek Grozny	Saint Petersburg
18:45 MST	Bukharov (yellow card) 86'	Report	Gvazava (yellow card) 22'; António Ferreira (yellow card) 86'; Dzhanaev (yellow card) 90'	Stadium: Petrovsky Stadium; Attendance: 18,500; Referee: Vladimir Kazmenko

24 July 2011 17	Anzhi Makhachkala	0–1	Zenit	Makhachkala, Dagestan
21:00 MST	Tagirbekov (yellow card) 18'; Revishvili (yellow card) 81'	Report	Kerzhakov 80'	Stadium: Dynamo Stadium; Attendance: 15,000; Referee: Maksim Layushkin

31 July 2011 18	Zenit	1–0	Spartak Nalchik	Saint Petersburg
16:30 MST	Fayzulin 23'	Report	Džudović (yellow card) 7'	Stadium: Petrovsky Stadium; Attendance: 20,700; Referee: Yuri Baskakov

6 August 2011 19	CSKA Moscow	0–2	Zenit	Moscow
18:45 MST	Ignashevich (yellow card) 64'; Doumbia (yellow card) 71'; Vágner Love (yellow card) 79'; Rahimić (yellow card) 88'	Report	Zyryanov (yellow card) 16'; Kerzhakov 54'; Anyukov 56'; Fayzulin (yellow card) 79'	Stadium: Arena Khimki; Attendance: 18,000; Referee: Aleksei Nikolaev

14 August 2011 20	Zenit	1–1	Amkar Perm	Saint Petersburg
17:45 MST	Kerzhakov (yellow card) 16', (goal) 52'; Shirokov (yellow card) 61'; Bukharov (yellow card) 90'; Criscito (yellow card) 90'	Report	Kolomeytsev 23'; Volkov (yellow card) 34'; Popov (yellow card) 45'; Mijailović (yellow card) 70'; Narubin (yellow card) 90'; Cherenchikov (yellow card) 90'	Stadium: Petrovsky Stadium; Attendance: 21,000; Referee: Vyacheslav Kharlamov

20 August 2011 21	Krylia Sovetov	2–5	Zenit	Samara, Samara Oblast
18:15 MST	Yakovlev 31', 51', (yellow card) 90'	Report	Danny 22'; Shirokov 29', 78' (pen.); Lombaerts 32'; Fayzulin 34'	Stadium: Metallurg Stadium; Attendance: 19,100; Referee: Igor Egorov

28 August 2011 22	Zenit	5–0	Krasnodar	Saint Petersburg
16:45 MST	Criscito (yellow card) 14'; Kerzhakov 24', 30', 79' (pen.); Shirokov 85'; Danny 90'	Report	Anđelković (yellow card) 35'; Kulchiy (yellow card) 52'; Mikheyev (yellow card) 67'; Joãozinho (yellow card) 78'	Stadium: Petrovsky Stadium; Attendance: 21,200; Referee: Vyacheslav Popov

10 September 2011 23	Lokomotiv Moscow	4–2	Zenit	Moscow
16:10 MST	Caicedo (yellow card) 16', (goal) 62'; Yanbaev (yellow card) 18'; Shishkin (yellow card) 33'; Obinna 46'; Tarasov (yellow card) 53'; Da Costa 77', 88'	Report	Lazović 8'; Hubočan (yellow card) 14'; Fayzulin (yellow card) 20'; Bukharov 31'; Lombaerts (yellow card) 55'	Stadium: Lokomotiv Stadium; Attendance: 19,180; Referee: Aleksey Nikolaev

17 September 2011 24	Rubin Kazan	2–3	Zenit	Kazan, Tatarstan
17:00 MST	Natcho 7' (pen.); Kislyak 23'; Navas (yellow card) 69'; Noboa (yellow card) 82'	Report	Danny (yellow card) 7', (goal) 50', 68'; Shirokov (yellow card) 12', (goal) 28'; Malafeev (yellow card) 24'; Alves (yellow card) 33'; Zyryanov (yellow card) 44'; Zhevnov (yellow card) 90'	Stadium: Central Stadium; Attendance: 21,450; Referee: Sergei Karasev

24 September 2011 25	Zenit	4–0	Tom Tomsk	Saint Petersburg
16:00 MST	Fayzulin 4'; Shirokov 23'; Luković (yellow card) 34'; Kerzhakov 43', 54'; Anyukov (yellow card) 55'; Bukharov (yellow card) 90'	Report	Skoblyakov (yellow card) 41'; Stroyev (yellow card) 45'	Stadium: Petrovsky Stadium; Attendance: 19,000; Referee: Aleksei Eskov

2 October 2011 26	Spartak Moscow	2–2	Zenit	Moscow
16:00 MST	Anyukov 22' (o.g.); Pareja (yellow card) 32' (yellow-red card) 43'; Welliton (yellow card) 68', (goal) 80'	Report	Danny 39'; Kerzhakov 47'; Hubočan (yellow card) 68'; Lombaerts (yellow card) 71'	Stadium: Luzhniki Stadium; Attendance: 37,075; Referee: Vladimir Kazmenko

15 October 2011 27	Zenit	0–0	Dynamo Moscow	Saint Petersburg
18:15 MST	Alves (yellow card) 52'; Luković (yellow card) 71'	Report	Yusupov (yellow card) 40'; Lomić (yellow card) 49'; Granat (yellow card) 79'	Stadium: Petrovsky Stadium; Attendance: 21,000; Referee: Mikhail Vilkov

23 October 2011 28	Rostov	1–3	Zenit	Rostov-on-Don, Rostov Oblast
15:00 MST	Smolnikov (yellow card) 15'; Ahumada (yellow card) 19'; Bracamonte 49'; Cociș (yellow card) 62'; Kalachev (yellow card) 72'; Adamov (yellow card) 85'	Report	Danny 9', (yellow card) 87'; Luković 15' (pen.), (yellow card) 61'; Bukharov 32', (yellow card) 65'; Shirokov (yellow card) 69'; Alves (yellow card) 80'; Bystrov (yellow card) 90'	Stadium: Olimp – 2 Attendance: 15,000; Referee: Timur Arsanbekov

28 October 2011 29	Zenit	3–0	Volga	Saint Petersburg
19:00 MST	Fayzulin 2'; Bukharov 37'; Lazović 69' (pen.)	Report	Arziani (yellow card) 39'; Shulenin (yellow card) 51'; Abayev (yellow card) 69'; Székely (yellow card) 89'	Stadium: Petrovsky Stadium; Attendance: 19,350; Referee: Aleksei Nikolaev

6 November 2011 30	Kuban Krasnodar	1–1	Zenit	Krasnodar, Krasnodar Krai
17:15 MST	Lolo (yellow card) 2'; Bucur (yellow card) 8'; Traoré (yellow card) 46'; Traoré 66' (pen.)	Report	Denisov 28'; Luković (yellow card) 30'; Alves (yellow card) 49'; Hubočan (yellow card) 65'	Stadium: Kuban Stadium; Attendance: 28,650; Referee: Igor Egorov

==== Table ====
Pos	Team	Pld	W	D	L	GF	GA	GD	Pts	Qualification
1	Zenit St. Petersburg	30	17	10	3	59	25	+34	61	Qualification to Championship group
2	CSKA Moscow	30	16	11	3	58	29	+29	59	Qualification to Championship group
3	Dynamo Moscow	30	16	7	7	51	30	+21	55	Qualification to Championship group
4	Spartak Moscow	30	15	8	7	48	33	+15	53 (Note: Spartak Moscow ahead of Lokomotiv Moscow on head-to-head points; Lokomotiv Moscow–Spartak Moscow 0–2, Spartak Moscow–Lokomotiv Moscow 3–0.)	Qualification to Championship group
5	Lokomotiv Moscow	30	15	8	7	49	30	+19	53	Qualification to Championship group

Source: Russian Premier League
Rules for classification: 1) points; 2) number of wins; 3) head-to-head points; 4) number of head-to-head wins; 5) head-to-head goal difference; 6) number of head-to-head goals scored; 7) number of head-to-head away goals scored; 8) goal difference; 9) number of goals scored; 10) number of away goals scored.
Notes:

Pos	Team	Pld	W	D	L	GF	GA	GD	Pts	Qualification
1	Zenit St. Petersburg (C)	44	24	16	4	85	40	+45	88	Qualification to Champions League group stage
2	Spartak Moscow	44	21	12	11	69	47	+22	75	Qualification to Champions League play-off round
3	CSKA Moscow	44	19	16	9	72	47	+25	73	Qualification to Europa League play-off round
4	Dynamo Moscow	44	20	12	12	66	50	+16	72	Qualification to Europa League third qualifying round
5	Anzhi Makhachkala	44	19	13	12	54	42	+12	70	Qualification to Europa League second qualifying round
6	Rubin Kazan	44	17	17	10	55	41	+14	68	Qualification to Europa League group stage (Note: Rubin have won the 2011–12 Russian Cup and thus have qualified for the group stage of the 2012–13 UEFA Europa League.)
7	Lokomotiv Moscow	44	18	12	14	59	48	+11	66	
8	Kuban Krasnodar	44	15	16	13	50	45	+5	61	

Source: Russian Premier League
Rules for classification: 1) points; 2) number of wins; 3) head-to-head points; 4) number of head-to-head wins; 5) head-to-head goal difference; 6) number of head-to-head goals scored; 7) number of head-to-head away goals scored; 8) goal difference; 9) number of goals scored; 10) number of away goals scored
(C) Champions

=== UEFA Champions League ===
==== Group stage – Group G ====
13 September 2011 Matchday 1	APOEL (Cyprus)	2–1	(Russia) Zenit	Nicosia, Cyprus
20:45 CET	Oliveira (yellow card) 40'; Morais (yellow card) 71'; Paulo Jorge (yellow card) 71'; Manduca 73'; Aílton 75'; Jahić (yellow card) 79'	Report	Alves (yellow card) 29' (yellow-red card) 76'; Danny (yellow card) 35'; Zyryanov 63'	Stadium: GSP Stadium; Attendance: 21,269; Referee: (Spain) Eduardo Iturralde González

28 September 2011 Matchday 2	Zenit (Russia)	3–1	(Portugal) Porto	Saint Petersburg
18:00 CET	Shirokov 20', 63'; Hubočan (yellow card) 61'; Danny 72'	Report	J. Rodríguez 10'; Fucile (yellow card) 25' (yellow-red card) 45'; Otamendi (yellow card) 62'; Belluschi (yellow card) 69'	Stadium: Petrovsky Stadium; Attendance: 21,405; Referee: (England) Howard Webb

19 October 2011 Matchday 3	Shakhtar (Ukraine)	2–2	Zenit (Russia)	Donetsk
20:45 CET	Willian 15'; Luiz Adriano 46'; Chyzhov (yellow card) 58'; Srna (yellow card) 62'	Report	Alves (yellow card) 3'; Shirokov 33'; Fayzulin 60'; Criscito (yellow card) 62'	Stadium: Donbas Arena; Attendance: 21,405; Referee: (Belgium) Frank De Bleeckere

1 November 2011 Matchday 4	Zenit (Russia)	1–0	Shakhtar (Ukraine)	Saint Petersburg
18:00 CET	Lombaerts 46'; Denisov (yellow card) 74'; Lazović (yellow card) 91'	Report	Srna (yellow card) 23'; Willian (yellow card) 52'; Luiz Adriano (yellow card) 65'	Stadium: Petrovskiy Stadium; Attendance: 21,405; Referee: (France) Stéphane Lannoy

23 November 2011 Matchday 5	Zenit (Russia)	0–0	APOEL (Cyprus)	Saint Petersburg
18:00 CET	Criscito (yellow card) 45'; Lombaerts (yellow card) 85'; Hubočan (yellow card) 93'	Report	Alexandrou (yellow card) 42'; Ilia (yellow card) 53'; Paulo Jorge (yellow card) 92'	Stadium: Petrovskiy Stadium; Attendance: 21,500; Referee: (Germany) Felix Brych

6 December 2011 Matchday 6	(Portugal) Porto	0–0	Zenit (Russia)	Porto
20:45 CET	Helton (yellow card) 38'; Otamendi (yellow card) 48'; Hulk (yellow card) 71'	Report	Anyukov (yellow card) 28'; Fayzulin (yellow card) 40'; Malafeev (yellow card) 76'	Stadium: Estádio do Dragão; Attendance: 46,512; Referee: (Spain) Carlos Velasco Carballo

=== Pre-season ===
22 January 2011 Match World Cup	Sparta Prague (Czech Republic)	0–3	(Russia) Zenit Saint Petersburg	Dubai, UAE
18:30 MST	Řepka (yellow card) 35'; Vacek (yellow card) 72'; Kušnír (yellow card) 79'	Report	Kerzhakov 1'; Ionov 34'; Rosina (yellow card) 38'; Alves 74'; Lazović (yellow card) 78'; Fayzulin (yellow card) 80'; Zyryanov (yellow card) 83'	Stadium: Al-Maktoum Stadium

24 January 2011 Match World Cup	Zenit Saint Petersburg (Russia)	2–0	(Iran) Persepolis	Dubai, UAE
18:30 MST	Kerzhakov 8'; Alves (yellow card) 34'; Denisov (yellow card) 72'; Semak 79'; Rosina (yellow card) 80'; Gigolayev (yellow card) 89'	Report	Zare (yellow card) 44'	Stadium: Al-Maktoum Stadium

26 January 2011 Final	Zenit Saint Petersburg (Russia)	1–1 (1–4 p)	(Saudi Arabia) Al-Hilal	Dubai, UAE
18:30 MST	Denisov (yellow card) 21'; Huszti 62'; Kerzhakov (yellow card) 78'; Lazović (yellow card) 80' (yellow-red card) 90'	Report	Rădoi (yellow card) 20', (goal) 90'; Nami (yellow card) 22'; Al-Marshedi (yellow card) 68'	Stadium: Al-Maktoum Stadium
	Penalties
	Luković (penalty scored); Shirokov (penalty missed); Meira (penalty missed)		Rădoi (penalty scored); Al-Shalhoub (penalty scored); Al-Mehyani (penalty scored); Hawsawi (penalty scored)

28 January 2011	Metalist Kharkiv (Ukraine)	1–1	(Russia) Zenit Saint Petersburg	Jebel Ali, UAE
15:00 MST	Pshenychnykh 85'	Report	Lazović 43' (pen.)

3 February 2011 Marbella Cup	Zenit Saint Petersburg (Russia)	2–1	(Bulgaria) Lokomotiv Plovdiv	Marbella, Spain
18:00 MST	Huszti 13', (yellow card) 67'; Starikov 75'	Report	Vitanov (yellow card) 19'; Y. Bengelloun (yellow card) 66'; Zlatinski 72'	Stadium: Estadio Municipal de Marbella

5 February 2011 Marbella Cup	Polonia Warszawa (Poland)	1–0	(Russia) Zenit Saint Petersburg	Marbella, Spain
16:00 MST	Smolarek 9'	Report	Kerzhakov (yellow card) 24'; Denisov (yellow card) 67'; Ionov (yellow card) 75'	Stadium: Estadio Municipal de Marbella

8 February 2011 Marbella Cup	Zenit Saint Petersburg (Russia)	1–2	(Czech Republic) Sparta Prague	Marbella, Spain
18:00 MST	Fayzulin (yellow card) 17'; Lazović 38' (pen.)	Report	Abena 43'; Kušnír (yellow card) 48'; Lačný 52'	Stadium: Estadio Municipal de Marbella

13 February 2011 Marbella Cup	Zenit Saint Petersburg (Russia)	0–0	(Ukraine) Dynamo Kyiv	Marbella, Spain
19:00 MST		Report	Yussuf (yellow card) 40'; Eremenko (yellow card) 53'; Silva (yellow card) 63'	Stadium: Estadio Municipal de Marbella

=== 2011 CIS Cup ===
==== Group stage ====
Team	Pld	W	D	L	GF	GA	GD	Pts
(Belarus) Shakhtyor Soligorsk	3	2	1	0	9	2	+7	7
(Russia) Zenit Saint Petersburg	3	2	1	0	4	1	+3	7
(Estonia) Flora Tallinn	3	1	0	2	3	7	−4	3
(Turkmenistan) Balkan	3	0	0	3	1	7	−6	0

15 January 2011	Zenit Saint Petersburg (Russia)	1–0	(Estonia) Flora Tallinn	Saint Petersburg, Russia
	S. Petrov 25'; Murikhin (yellow card) 60'; Cheminava (red card) 62'	Report		Stadium: Petersburg SCC; Attendance: 4,500

16 January 2011	Shakhtyor Soligorsk (Belarus)	1–1	(Russia) Zenit Saint Petersburg	Saint Petersburg, Russia
19:00 MST	Kirenkin (yellow card) 26'; Grenkov (yellow card) 45'; Alumona 78'	Report	Tsyganov 83'	Stadium: Petersburg SCC; Attendance: 5,300

18 January 2011	Zenit Saint Petersburg (Russia)	2–0	(Turkmenistan) Nebitçi Balkanabat	Saint Petersburg, Russia
20:00 MST	Murikhin 33'; Tsyganov 84'	Report	Sarkisov (yellow card) 24'; Meredov (yellow card) 68'; Garakhanov (yellow card) 82'	Stadium: Petersburg SCC; Attendance: 2,000

==== Knockout phase ====
19 January 2011 Quarter-final	Zenit Saint Petersburg (Russia)	2–1	(Finland) HJK Helsinki	Saint Petersburg, Russia
16:00 MST	Batov (yellow card) 6'; Sirotov (yellow card) 43'; Matyash 62', 65'; Mogilevets (yellow card) 75'; Zinkov (yellow card) 86'	Report	Ring (yellow card) 20'; Kastrati (yellow card) 63'; Yobe (yellow card) 78'; Parikka 84' (pen.)	Stadium: Petersburg SCC; Attendance: 500; Referee: Vitali Meshkov

21 January 2011 Semi-final	Inter Baku (Azerbaijan)	5–0	(Russia) Zenit Saint Petersburg	Saint Petersburg, Russia
17:00 MST	Karlsons 3', 15', 54'; Zlatinov 7'; Levin (yellow card) 27'; Chertoganov (yellow card) 30'; Amiraslanov 70'	Report	Kostin (yellow card) 45'	Stadium: Petersburg SCC; Attendance: 3,000; Referee: Sergei Karasev

=== Russian Cup ===
1 March 2011 Round of 16	Anzhi Makhachkala	2–3	Zenit Saint Petersburg	Grozny
18:00	Agalarov 22'; D. Ivanov 90'	Report	Huszti 12' (pen.); Danny 67'; Lazović 83'	Stadium: Sultan Bilimkhanov Stadium; Attendance: 2,500; Referee: Almir Kayumov
Note: Anzhi's home stadium in Makhachkala was ruled not fit for the game due to weather conditions.

20 April 2011 Quarter-finals	Zenit St. Petersburg	0–2	CSKA Moscow	Saint Petersburg
20:00		Report	Doumbia 41'; Ignashevich 58' (pen.)	Stadium: Petrovsky Stadium; Attendance: 19,000; Referee: Stanislav Sukhina

=== Russian Super Cup ===
6 March 2011	Zenit Saint Petersburg	1–0	CSKA Moscow	Krasnodar, Russia
13:00 MST	Ionov 57'	Report		Stadium: Kuban Stadium; Attendance: 22,500; Referee: Aleksei Nikolayev
