= Nicolas Lombaerts =

Belgian footballer (born 1985)

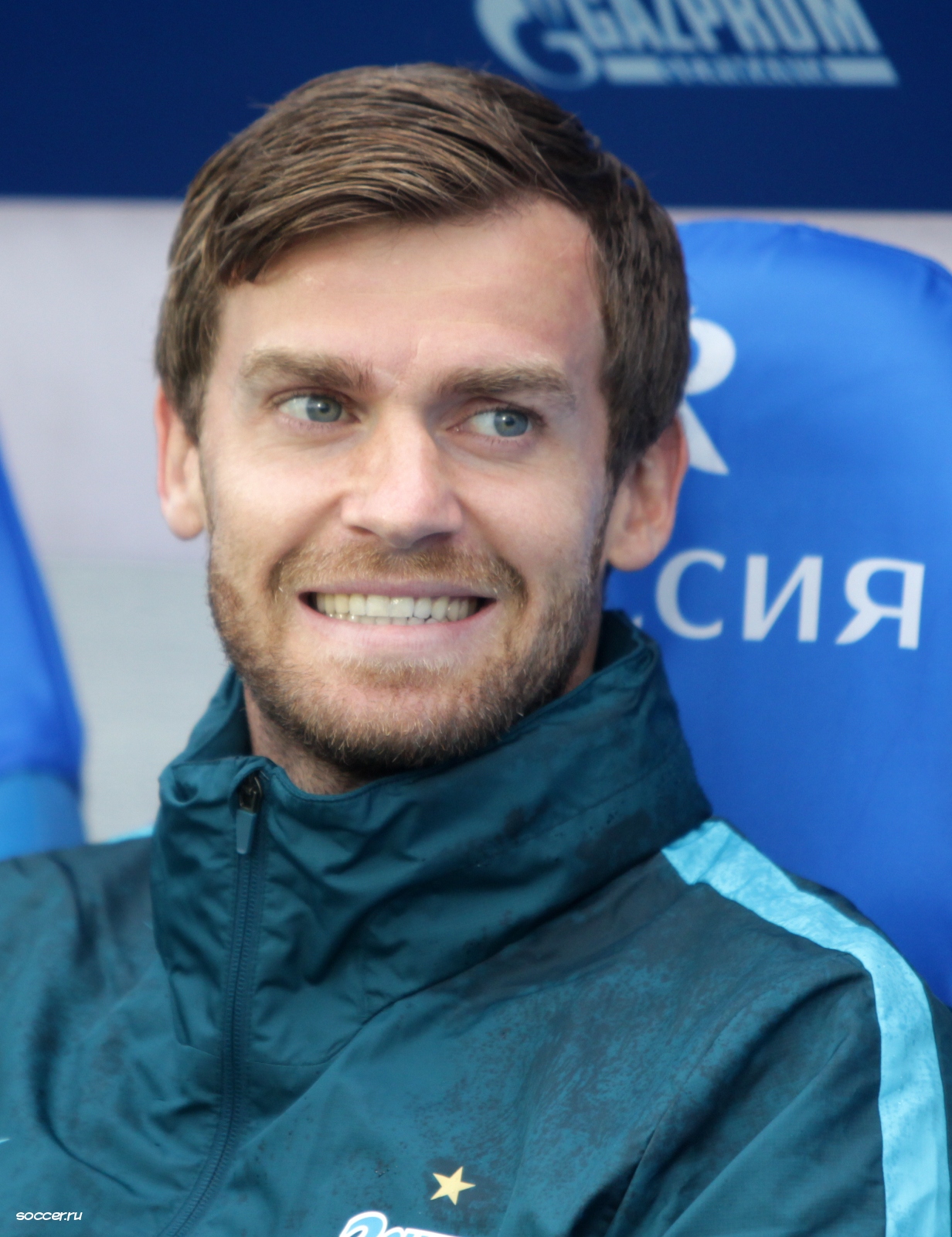
- Lombaerts with Zenit in 2016

Personal information
- Full name: Nicolas Robert Christian Lombaerts
- Date of birth: 20 March 1985 (age 41)
- Place of birth: Bruges, Belgium
- Height: 1.88 m (6 ft 2 in)
- Position: Centre-back

Youth career
- 1991–2004: Club Brugge

Senior career*
Years	Team	Apps	(Gls)
2004–2007	Gent	76	(1)
2007–2017	Zenit Saint Petersburg	196	(9)
2017–2019	KV Oostende	52	(1)
2019–2020	KV Oostende B	22	(1)
Total		346	(12)

International career
2006–2016	Belgium	39	(3)

Managerial career
- 2021–2023: Gent (assistant)
- * Club domestic league appearances and goals

Nicolas Robert Christian Lombaerts (born 20 March 1985) is a Belgian professional football coach and a former centre-back.

== Club career ==
=== Brugge ===
Lombaerts joined Club Brugge at young age where he went through all youth ranks. He claimed various league titles at young age as he was part of a strong generation at Brugge, with players such as Jason Vandelannoite, Glenn Verbauwhede and Thomas Matton.

=== Gent ===
As his ambition was to play in the starting lineup of a first division team as soon as possible and Club Brugge was not able to guarantee this, he moved to Gent where he soon was able to play almost every match in the 2005–06 Belgian First Division and also got his first appearance for the Belgium national football team. Apart from football, he was at that point still studying law at Ghent University. Several times he was selected for the Belgian national youth teams such as the Belgium national under-21 football team. Highlights were the 2004 UEFA European Under-19 Football Championship and the 2007 UEFA European Under-21 Football Championship.

=== Zenit Saint Petersburg ===
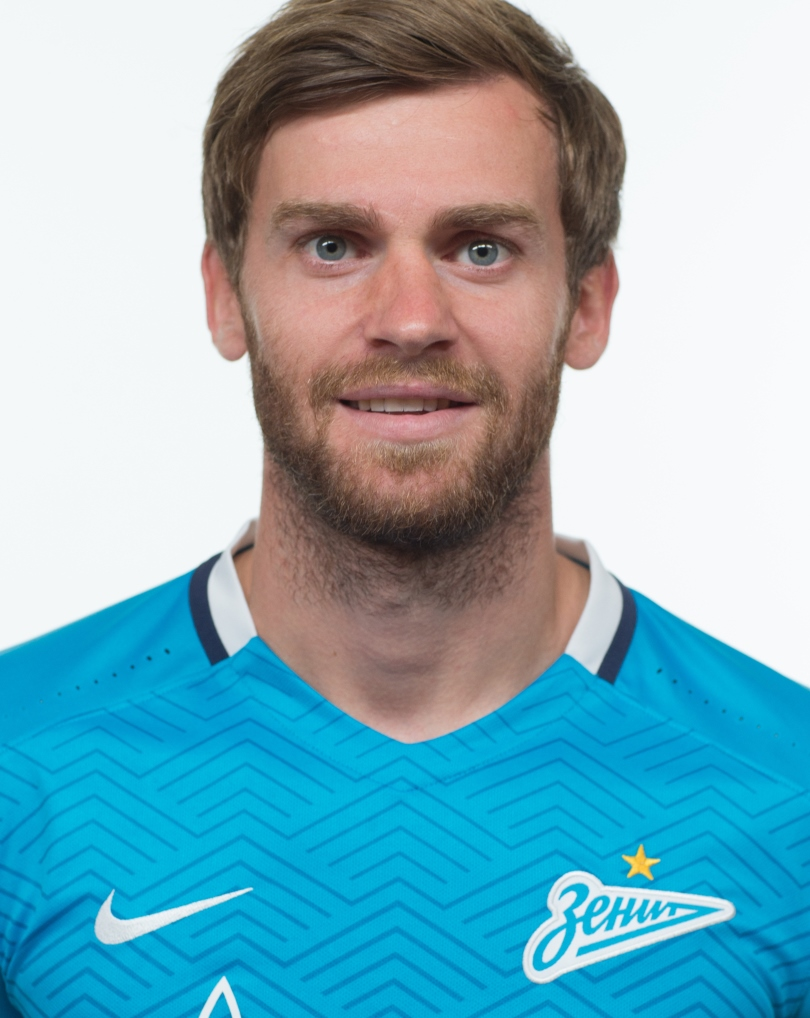
Lombaerts in 2015

In July 2007, Lombaerts chose a lucrative transfer to the Zenit Saint Petersburg in Russia. At that point he quit his studies and chose for a football career. Zenit eventually won its first Russian league title with the 2007 Russian Premier League. At the beginning of 2008, Lombaerts was sidelined for over half a year as the result of a knee injury. He received knee injury in UEFA Cup game against Villarreal CF during the attack that led to the only away goal against the Spanish team. His actions in this game (goal assist by header) later on have been regarded by Zenit fans as one of the most important steps in the subsequent victory in UEFA Cup. In the following games without him, his team won the 2007–08 UEFA Cup and he also missed the 2008 Summer Olympics where Belgium finished fourth.

Lombaerts finally made his return to Zenit on 19 July 2009, coming on in the 71st minute for Aleksei Ionov against Terek Grozny. Even though Zenit were defeated 3–2, Lombaerts described the happiness of taking the pitch again as similar to "a small child's joy when walking into a shop full of sweets." He then quickly became a fixture in defense for caretaker Anatoliy Davydov, helping Zenit win six consecutive matches to get back into the title hunt. On 29 November 2009, Lombaerts scored the game-winning goal against rival Spartak Moscow to put Zenit into the 2010-11 UEFA Champions League as third-place team in Russia.

On 5 July 2010, Lombaerts signed a four-year contract to remain with Zenit.

=== Oostende ===
On 24 March 2017, it was announced that after 10 seasons with Zenit, Lombaerts would return to Belgium for 2017–18 season, signing with K.V. Oostende. He played his last, 289th official game for Zenit on 17 May 2017 in a game against Krasnodar and was honoured by the club.

On 30 July 2019, it was announced that the club wanted to terminate his contract in exchange for a severance payment of €300,000 and was sent to the B-team. The club was in financial problems after owner Marc Coucke left the club, why they wanted to part ways with Lombaerts and his heavy wages.

== International career ==
Lombaerts made his debut for the Belgium national team in May 2006 in a friendly against Saudi Arabia, and played 3 matches in Euro 2008 qualifying.

On 26 May 2014, in a pre-World Cup match against Luxembourg, Lombaerts came on as a substitute in the 77th minute for Jan Vertonghen. As Belgium had already made the six permitted substitutions, the match was therefore declared invalid on 4 June.

== Coaching career ==
On 28 May 2021, it was confirmed that Lombaerts would become the assistant manager of Hein Vanhaezebrouck at his former club K.A.A. Gent from the start of the 2021–22 season.

== Career statistics ==
=== Club ===
As of match played 22 December 2017

Appearances and goals by club, season and competition
Club	Season	League			National cup (Note: Includes Belgian Cup, Russian Cup)		Continental		Other		Total	
Club	Season	Division	Apps	Goals	Apps	Goals	Apps	Goals	Apps	Goals	Apps	Goals
Gent	2004–05	Belgian First Division A	13	0	1	0	–		–		14	0
Gent	2005–06	Belgian First Division A	31	1	3	0	6 (Note: Appearances in UEFA Intertoto Cup)	0	–		40	1
Gent	2006–07	Belgian First Division A	32	0	5	0	2	0	–		39	0
Gent	Total		76	1	9	0	8	0	–		93	1
Zenit Saint Petersburg	2007	Russian Premier League	13	2	2	0	8 (Note: Appearances in UEFA Cup)	0	–		23	2
Zenit Saint Petersburg	2008	Russian Premier League	2	0	0	0	3	0	–		5	0
Zenit Saint Petersburg	2009	Russian Premier League	15	2	1	0	2 (Note: Appearances in UEFA Champions League)	0	–		18	2
Zenit Saint Petersburg	2010	Russian Premier League	26	3	4	0	7	0	–		37	3
Zenit Saint Petersburg	2011–12	Russian Premier League	40	1	2	0	8	2	–		50	3
Zenit Saint Petersburg	2012–13	Russian Premier League	22	0	2	0	10 (Note: Six appearances in UEFA Champions League, four appearances in UEFA Europa League)	0	1 (Note: Appearance in Russian Super Cup)	0	35	0
Zenit Saint Petersburg	2013–14	Russian Premier League	27	1	0	0	12	0	–		39	1
Zenit Saint Petersburg	2014–15	Russian Premier League	24	0	1	0	12 (Note: Nine appearances in UEFA Champions League, three appearances in UEFA Europa League)	0	–		37	0
Zenit Saint Petersburg	2015–16	Russian Premier League	18	0	2	0	8	0	1	0	29	0
Zenit Saint Petersburg	2016–17	Russian Premier League	8	0	2	0	5 (Note: Appearances in UEFA Europa League)	0	–		15	0
Zenit Saint Petersburg	Total		195	9	16	0	75	2	2	0	288	11
Oostende	2017–18	Belgian First Division A	17	0	3	0	–		–		20	0
Career total			288	10	28	0	83	2	2	0	401	12

=== International ===
Appearances and goals by national team and year
National team	Year	Apps	Goals
Belgium national team	2006	1	0
Belgium national team	2007	3	0
Belgium national team	2008	0	0
Belgium national team	2009	3	0
Belgium national team	2010	5	1
Belgium national team	2011	6	1
Belgium national team	2012	2	0
Belgium national team	2013	4	0
Belgium national team	2014	7	1
Belgium national team	2015	6	0
Belgium national team	2016	2	0
Total		39	3

Scores and results list Belgium's goal tally first, score column indicates score after each Lombaerts goal.

List of international goals scored by Nicolas Lombaerts
#	Date	Venue	Opponent	Score	Result	Competition
1	12 October 2010	King Baudouin Stadium, Brussels, Belgium	Austria	4–3	4–4	UEFA Euro 2012 Qualification
2	6 September 2011	King Baudouin Stadium, Brussels, Belgium	United States	1–0	1–0	Friendly
3	12 November 2014	King Baudouin Stadium, Brussels, Belgium	Iceland	1–0	3–1	Friendly

== Honours ==
Zenit Saint Petersburg

- Russian Premier League: 2007, 2010, 2011–12, 2014–15
- Russian Cup: 2009–10
- Russian Super Cup: 2008, 2011
- UEFA Cup: 2007–08
- UEFA Super Cup: 2008
