= Igor Denisov =

Russian footballer (born 1984)

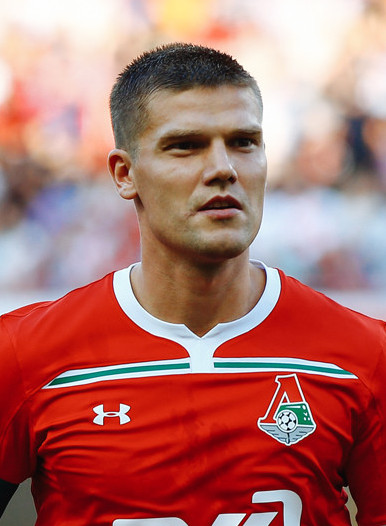
- Denisov with Lokomotiv Moscow in 2018

Personal information
- Full name: Igor Vladimirovich Denisov
- Date of birth: 17 May 1984 (age 42)
- Place of birth: Leningrad, Russian SFSR, Soviet Union
- Height: 1.76 m (5 ft 9 in)
- Position: Defensive midfielder

Youth career
- Turbostroitel St. Petersburg
- Smena St. Petersburg

Senior career*
Years	Team	Apps	(Gls)
2002–2013	Zenit Saint Petersburg	254	(23)
2013	Anzhi Makhachkala	3	(0)
2013–2017	Dynamo Moscow	62	(1)
2016–2017	→ Lokomotiv Moscow (loan)	23	(1)
2017–2019	Lokomotiv Moscow	44	(0)
Total		386	(25)

International career
2003–2006	Russia U21	16	(4)
2008–2016	Russia	54	(0)

Managerial career
- 2024: Academy Torpedo Moscow
- 2025–2026: SSOR Zenit
- * Club domestic league appearances and goals

Igor Vladimirovich Denisov (Russian: Игорь Владимирович Денисов; born 17 May 1984) is a Russian former professional footballer who played as a midfielder.

Denisov spent most of his career from 2002 to 2013 at his hometown club Zenit Saint Petersburg, playing 354 games, scoring 29 goals and winning honours including three Russian Premier League titles and the UEFA Cup in 2008. He then played for Anzhi Makhachkala, Dynamo Moscow and Lokomotiv Moscow, winning a further Premier League and two Russian Cups with the last of those clubs.

He made his debut for Russia in 2008, playing 54 games over the next eight years and featuring at Euro 2012 and the 2014 World Cup. He has been the subject of controversy, courting numerous arguments at the club and international level during his professional career.

== Club career ==
=== Zenit ===
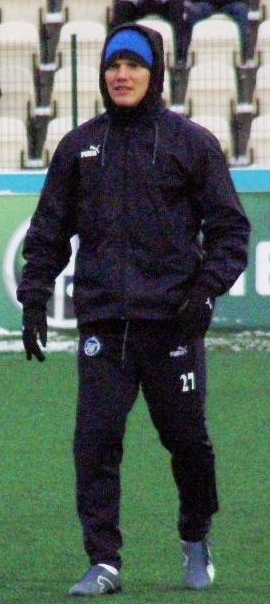
Igor Denisov warming up for Zenit.

Denisov was born in Leningrad (now St. Petersburg) and started his footballing career with Turbostroitel before going to Smena, the youth team of Zenit. Denisov signed his first professional contract with Zenit, St. Petersburg's only professional team, after graduating school in 2002. At the age of 18, Denisov made his debut for Zenit in a league match against CSKA Moscow in 2002. He made his breakthrough with the club the following year, scoring twice in 19 appearances.

Under Dutch manager Dick Advocaat, Denisov blossomed as a player, developing into an advanced midfield role behind Andrey Arshavin and Aleksandr Kerzhakov, becoming an influential member of the Zenit squad that won their first Russian Premier League title in 2007. On 3 April 2008, Denisov scored Zenit's fourth goal in their 4–1 first leg defeat of Bayer Leverkusen in the quarter-finals of the UEFA Cup match at the BayArena. Denisov's performances helped Zenit reach the final against Scottish side Rangers on 15 May, after defeating Bayern Munich 5–1 on aggregate in the semi-finals. In the final, Denisov played the full ninety minutes and opened the scoring in the 72nd minute after being played in by winger Andrei Arshavin. Zenit went on to win the match 2–0 and lift the UEFA Cup for the first time in their history. In the resulting UEFA Super Cup, Denisov played the full ninety again, assisting Pavel Pogrebnyak's headed goal as Zenit upset English heavyweight Manchester United 2–1 on 29 August 2008.

On 29 June 2010, Denisov extended his contract with Zenit for a further five years. Six months later, on 22 December, Denisov was voted by the fans as the club's "Player of the Year", beating out the likes of playmaker Danny and goalkeeper Vyacheslav Malafeev.

On 27 October 2011, Denisov featured in his 300th competitive fixture for Zenit, in the 3–0 defeat of Volga, including 217 matches in the Premier League, 55 in European competition and 28 matches in domestic cup competitions. Denisov finished as runner up behind Malafeev as the club's MVP for the 2011–12 campaign, playing 57 games (starting all of them) whilst scoring one goal and providing eight assists. During the Russian Football Union awards ceremony on 26 May, Denisov was voted as the "Player of the Year" in the Russian Premier League and Zenit won five more club awards for 2011–12 including "Team of the Year."

On 11 August 2012, Denisov provided two assists in Zenit's 5–0 defeat of Spartak Moscow. On 3 September, Denisov was voted as Zenit's "Player of the Month" for August after playing all five league games and providing those two assists. Three weeks later, Denisov was demoted to the reserve team for improper behavior according to the club. Following more than a month with the youth side, Denisov was reinstated to the senior squad and began training with them again on 1 November. He made his return to the first team a day later, coming on as a 58th-minute substitute for Viktor Fayzulin in Zenit's 2–1 defeat of FC Rostov. Denisov's first full match since his return from exile with the youth team came on 6 November in a Champions League group game against RSC Anderlecht, playing the full ninety minutes in a 1–0 loss in Belgium.

=== Anzhi ===
Denisov announced his move to Russian Premier League club Anzhi Makhachkala for a fee of 15 million euros on 21 June 2013.

=== Dynamo Moscow ===
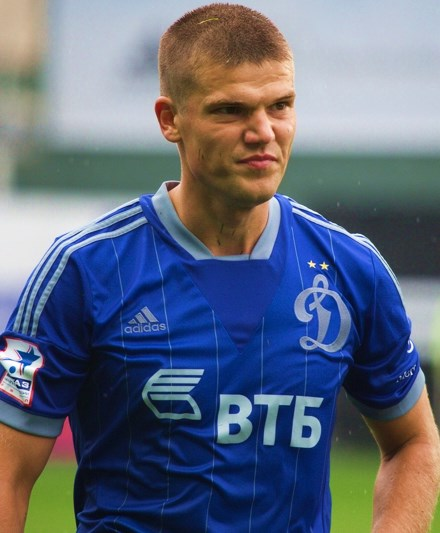
Denisov with Dynamo Moscow in 2013

On 15 August 2013, Denisov moved along with fellow Anzhi players Yuriy Zhirkov and Aleksandr Kokorin to FC Dynamo for an undisclosed fee. Denisov played in only three matches for Anzhi before the cash-strapped club began to sell its players.

In April 2015, Denisov was put up for sale by Dynamo and told to train on his own for insulting head coach Stanislav Cherchesov.

He returned to Dynamo's lineup in July 2015, after Cherchesov was dismissed as Dynamo's manager and replaced by Andrey Kobelev.

=== Lokomotiv Moscow ===
On 31 August 2016, he moved on loan to FC Lokomotiv Moscow for the remainder of the 2016–17 season. On 2 February 2017, he signed a permanent deal with Lokomotiv that started at the end of the season upon the expiration of his Dynamo contract.

On 27 May 2019, he left Lokomotiv by mutual consent. On 29 May 2019, he announced through his lawyers that he retired from playing.

== International career ==
Denisov first featured in the Russian national set up, representing the Under-19 side against Denmark in the second qualifying round for the 2003 UEFA U-19 European Championships. He then went on to captain the Russia U-21 team. Denisov trained with Russia in 2005 but did not get into the team.

After a good run of performances at the club level with Zenit, many sports journalists called for Denisov to be included in the squad for the European Championships in 2008, but he did not make the initial squad and later refused to be called up for the provisional 25-man squad of players after a number of injuries. Denisov made his debut for Russia on 11 October 2008 in a FIFA World Cup 2010 qualifier against Germany, a 2–1 loss at Signal Iduna Park in Dortmund.

He was confirmed for the finalized UEFA Euro 2012 squad on 25 May 2012. He featured in all three Group A matches, as Russia picked up four points but ultimately failed to qualify for the knockout stage due to their head-to-head record with Greece.

On 7 September 2012, Denisov was appointed by new Russia manager Fabio Capello as the captain of the national team in the wake of Andrei Arshavin's absence.

On 2 June 2014, he was included in Russia's 2014 FIFA World Cup squad.

On 6 June 2016, Denisov was ruled out of Euro 2016 with a thigh injury.

== Controversies ==
Throughout his career, Denisov has earned a reputation for poor behavior both at the club level with Zenit and at the international level with Russia. In the run up to the European Championships in 2008, Denisov was left out of the original 23-man squad by then manager Guus Hiddink; Denisov was called into the squad after a number of injuries but took umbrage and refused to play as Russia reached the semi-finals losing to eventual champions Spain.

In August 2010, he was involved in a road rage incident, where he fought a driving instructor after the learner driver in the instructor's car almost collided with Denisov's SUV. Denisov injured his foot in the incident and broke the instructor's nose. The instructor refused to press charges.

In September 2010, Denisov was involved in a training ground bust up with coach Vladislav Radimov, the argument escalated from a call Radimov made in a practice game and reports claim that Denisov was readying to punch Radimov before teammates physically stopped him. Two months later in a match against Spartak Moscow, Denisov verbally abused Spartak's manager Valery Karpin, subsequently leading to a brawl with both sets of players and a four match ban for the combative midfielder.

On 22 September 2012, Denisov was left off the teamsheet for Zenit's 2–2 away draw with Krylya Sovetov. The following day, the club issued a statement that read, "The decision to send Igor Denisov to the youth team for an indefinite period... is connected to the fact that the player issued an ultimatum, refusing to take to the field against Krylya Sovetov after demanding a renegotiation of his contract." According to the Zenit website, Denisov's current contract runs to 2015 and that he is one of the highest earners in all of the Russian Premier League. Media speculation reported that this pay strike was a result of Zenit's overhaul in the transfer market, bringing in Axel Witsel and Hulk on big contracts and in combined deals worth over $130 million. Denisov replied in an interview with Sport Express, stating that his stand-off with club management was over "The proper organisation of the team. And respect for the Russian players which Zenit has always relied upon." Two months after his protest, Denisov released a statement, telling the media that he was finished protesting over his pay strike and has apologised not only to the club but also to the fans, as he was wrong to walk out on the club.

On 7 April 2015, he was removed from training with the main Dynamo Moscow squad and transfer-listed by the team for "interfering with the work of the head coach" Stanislav Cherchesov.

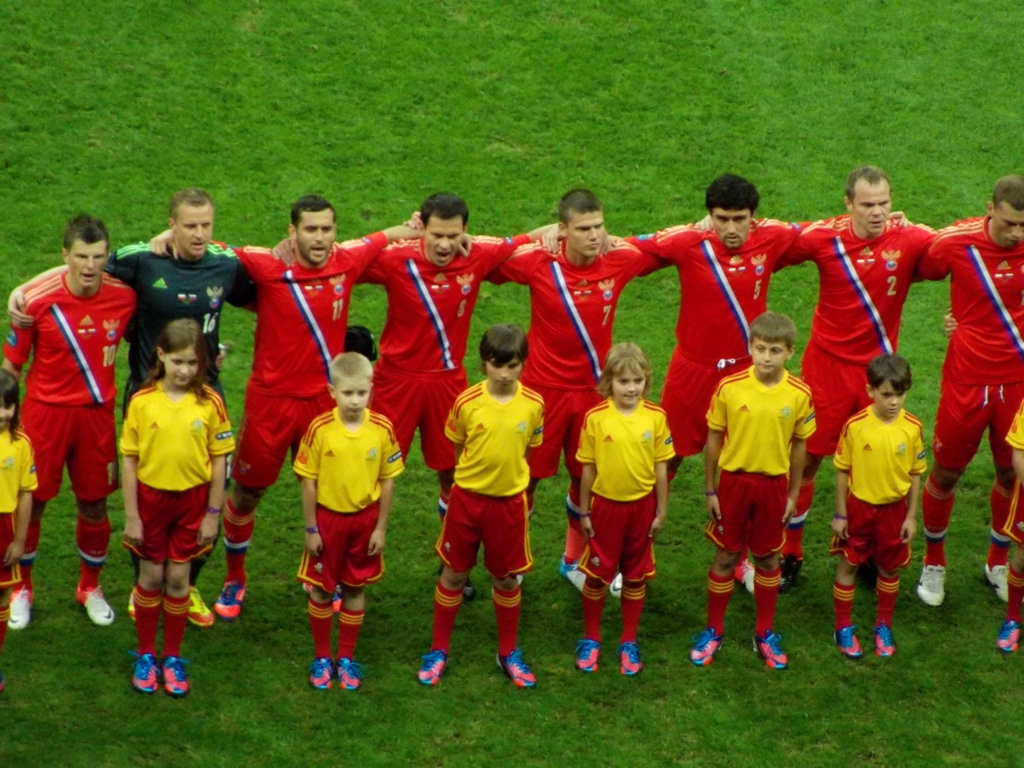
Denisov, 7, representing Russia against Poland at the European Championships

In November 2015, he was again moved to Dynamo's reserves squad by the new manager Andrey Kobelev after Denisov demanded that the club management fire the club's doctor whom Denisov called incompetent.

On 16 April 2018, he was fined 1 million rubles by his club Lokomotiv Moscow for insulting a doping control official during a test.

== Personal life ==
Denisov and his wife Elena have four children: Viktoria, born in 2005, Igor Jr., born in 2008, and twin sons Ivan and Daniil who were born on 18 December 2011. He owns two South African pitbulls and is known in Russia as being a very good chess player and for never giving interviews to reporters.

Denisov has publicly opposed the 2022 Russian invasion of Ukraine by saying: "These events are a disaster. Complete horror. I don’t know, maybe I’ll be imprisoned or killed for these words, but I am speaking as it is."

== Career statistics ==
=== Club ===
As of 13 April 2019

Appearances and goals by club, season and competition
Club	Season	League			Cup		Continental		Other		Total	
Club	Season	Division	Apps	Goals	Apps	Goals	Apps	Goals	Apps	Goals	Apps	Goals
Zenit Saint Petersburg	2001	Russian Premier League	0	0	0	0	–		–		0	0
Zenit Saint Petersburg	2002	Russian Premier League	1	0	0	0	0	0	–		1	0
Zenit Saint Petersburg	2003	Russian Premier League	19	2	2	1	–		2 (Note: Two appearances in the Russian Premier League Cup)	0	23	3
Zenit Saint Petersburg	2004	Russian Premier League	20	6	0	0	6	1	–		26	7
Zenit Saint Petersburg	2005	Russian Premier League	20	5	5	0	7	0	–		32	5
Zenit Saint Petersburg	2006	Russian Premier League	25	4	6	0	5	1	–		36	5
Zenit Saint Petersburg	2007	Russian Premier League	25	3	4	0	3	0	–		32	3
Zenit Saint Petersburg	2008	Russian Premier League	29	1	0	0	14	2	1 (Note: One appearance in the Russian Super Cup)	0	44	3
Zenit Saint Petersburg	2009	Russian Premier League	28	1	2	0	4	0	–		34	1
Zenit Saint Petersburg	2010	Russian Premier League	24	0	3	0	8	1	–		35	1
Zenit Saint Petersburg	2011–12	Russian Premier League	40	1	4	0	12	0	1 (Note: One appearance in the Russian Super Cup)	0	57	1
Zenit Saint Petersburg	2012–13	Russian Premier League	23	0	2	0	8	0	1 (Note: One appearance in the Russian Super Cup)	0	34	0
Zenit Saint Petersburg	Total		254	23	28	1	67	5	5	0	354	29
Anzhi	2013–14	Russian Premier League	3	0	–		–		–		3	0
Dynamo Moscow	2013–14	Russian Premier League	24	1	1	0	–		–		25	1
Dynamo Moscow	2014–15	Russian Premier League	13	0	0	0	8	0	–		21	0
Dynamo Moscow	2015–16	Russian Premier League	23	0	2	0	–		–		25	0
Dynamo Moscow	2016–17	Russian Football National League	2	0	1	0	–		–		3	0
Dynamo Moscow	Total		62	1	4	0	8	0	0	0	74	1
Lokomotiv Moscow	2016–17	Russian Premier League	23	1	5	1	–		–		28	2
Lokomotiv Moscow	2017–18	Russian Premier League	27	0	1	0	10	1	1 (Note: One appearance in the Russian Super Cup)	0	39	1
Lokomotiv Moscow	2018–19	Russian Premier League	17	0	2	0	6	0	1 (Note: One appearance in the Russian Super Cup)	0	26	0
Lokomotiv Moscow	Total		67	1	8	1	16	1	2	0	93	3
Career total			386	25	40	2	91	6	7	0	522	33

=== International ===
Appearances and goals by national team and year
National team	Year	Apps	Goals
Russia	2008	2	0
Russia	2009	9	0
Russia	2010	3	0
Russia	2011	8	0
Russia	2012	13	0
Russia	2013	5	0
Russia	2014	6	0
Russia	2015	6	0
Russia	2016	2	0
Total		54	0

== Honours ==
Zenit Saint Petersburg

- Russian Premier League: 2007, 2010, 2011–12
- Russian Cup: 2009–10
- Russian Super Cup: 2008, 2011
- Russian Premier League Cup: 2003
- UEFA Cup: 2007–08
- UEFA Super Cup: 2008

Lokomotiv Moscow

- Russian Premier League: 2017–18
- Russian Cup: 2016–17, 2018–19
