= Tomáš Hubočan =

Slovak footballer (born 1985)

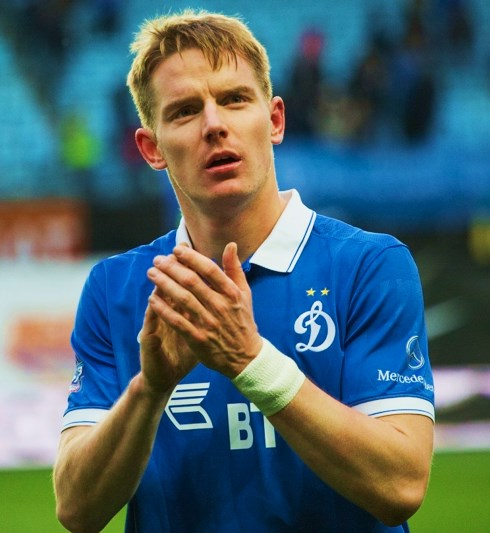
- Hubočan with Dynamo Moscow in 2014

Personal information
- Full name: Tomáš Hubočan
- Date of birth: 17 September 1985 (age 41)
- Place of birth: Žilina, Czechoslovakia
- Height: 1.83 m (6 ft 0 in)
- Position: Defender

Youth career
- Žilina

Senior career*
Years	Team	Apps	(Gls)
2004–2007	Žilina	38	(2)
2006	→ ViOn Zlaté Moravce (loan)	3	(1)
2008–2014	Zenit Saint Petersburg	114	(0)
2014–2016	Dynamo Moscow	40	(2)
2016–2019	Olympique Marseille	16	(0)
2017–2018	→ Trabzonspor (loan)	20	(0)
2019–2022	Omonia Nicosia	57	(0)
2022–2023	Karmiotissa	27	(0)
2023–2025	Žilina	39	(0)
Total		354	(5)

International career
2006–2021	Slovakia	73	(0)
- * Club domestic league appearances and goals

Tomáš Hubočan (Slovak pronunciation: [ˈtɔmaːʐ ˈɦubɔtʂan]; born 17 September 1985) is a Slovak former professional footballer who played as a defender.

He made his senior international debut in 2006. He has gone on to make 73 appearances for Slovakia, representing his nation at the UEFA Euro 2016 and the UEFA Euro 2020 tournaments. He retired as 9th most capped international footballer in December 2021.

== Club career ==
=== MŠK Žilina ===
Hubočan began in MŠK Žilina since his youth years, beyond the time when he was on loan in ViOn Zlaté Moravce since January 2006 until June 2006. After the end of loan he came back to Žilina and he worked up for one of the best defenders in Corgoň Liga. In the 2006–07 season, he won the league with Šošoni.

=== Zenit ===
Hubočan signed for Zenit Saint Petersburg on 11 February 2008 on a three-year contract for €3.8 million, the highest ever paid to a Slovak club.

On 30 September 2010, he scored his first goal for Zenit in a UEFA Europa League match against AEK Athens

=== Trabzonspor ===
On 7 September 2017, he joined Turkish club Trabzonspor on loan.

=== Omonia ===
On 4 September 2019, Hubočan joined Omonia on a one-year deal. He would later sign 2 one-year extensions, thus staying at the club until 2022.

== International career ==
Hubočan played his first international match for Slovakia against United Arab Emirates on 11 December 2006. He was a part of Slovakia's squad for the country's first European Championship tournament in 2016.

Hubočan announced his national team retirement on 22 February 2019, at age 33 along with another national team defender and captain Martin Škrtel and forward Adam Nemec. The trio shared a farewell game on 13 October 2019 in a friendly match against Paraguay, which coincided with a national team return to Tehelné pole after 10 years. Although Nemec and Škrtel had starred from the start of the game, Hubočan only entered the game symbolically in the 87th minute, due to a sprain. He entered with the game at 1–1. Ironically, this was Hubočan's first international game at the famed Slovak stadium, home to the national team for a number of years. The game ended in the same score.

In November 2020, Hubočan came out of retirement, playing in the UEFA Euro 2020 qualifying play-offs clinching game against Northern Ireland. In June 2021, he was included in the final 26-man roster for the rescheduled UEFA Euro 2020 tournament. After Slovakia failed to qualify for the 2022 FIFA World Cup, Hubočan announced his second and definitive retirement in an interview with Denník Šport, citing age and family commitments as main motivations.

== Career statistics ==
=== Club ===
As of 30 May 2022

Appearances and goals by club, season and competition
Club	Season	League			National cup (Note: Includes Slovak Cup, Russian Cup, Turkish Cup, Cypriot Cup)		Continental		Other		Total	
Club	Season	Division	Apps	Goals	Apps	Goals	Apps	Goals	Apps	Goals	Apps	Goals
Žilina	2004–05	Slovak Super Liga	2	0	0	0	0	0	—		2	0
Žilina	2005–06	Slovak Super Liga	0	0	0	0	0	0	—		0	0
Žilina	2006–07	Slovak Super Liga	26	1	0	0	—		—		26	1
Žilina	2007–08	Slovak Super Liga	10	0	0	0	2	0	—		12	0
Žilina	Total		38	2	0	0	2	0	—		40	2
ViOn Zlaté Moravce (loan)	2005–06	2. Liga	3	1	0	0	—		—		3	1
Zenit Saint Petersburg	2008	Russian Premier League	11	0	1	0	2	0	1 (Note: Appearance in Russian Super Cup)	0	15	0
Zenit Saint Petersburg	2009	Russian Premier League	11	0	1	0	1	0	—		13	0
Zenit Saint Petersburg	2010	Russian Premier League	23	0	3	0	7	1	—		33	1
Zenit Saint Petersburg	2011–12	Russian Premier League	30	0	4	0	8	0	—		42	0
Zenit Saint Petersburg	2012–13	Russian Premier League	24	0	3	0	9	0	1	0	37	0
Zenit Saint Petersburg	2013–14	Russian Premier League	15	0	0	0	8	0	1	0	24	0
Zenit Saint Petersburg	2014–15	Russian Premier League	0	0	0	0	0	0	—		0	0
Zenit Saint Petersburg	Total		114	0	12	0	35	1	3	0	164	1
Dynamo Moscow	2014–15	Russian Premier League	18	1	1	0	8	0	—		27	1
Dynamo Moscow	2015–16	Russian Premier League	22	1	2	0	—		—		24	1
Dynamo Moscow	Total		40	2	3	0	8	0	—		51	2
Marseille	2016–17	Ligue 1	13	0	0	0	—		1 (Note: Appearance in Coupe de la Ligue)	0	14	0
Marseille	2017–18	Ligue 1	1	0	0	0	2	0	—		3	0
Marseille	2018–19	Ligue 1	2	0	0	0	1	0	0	0	3	0
Marseille	Total		16	0	0	0	3	0	1	0	20	0
Trabzonspor (loan)	2017–18	Süper Lig	20	0	4	0	—		—		24	0
Omonia	2019–20	Cypriot First Division	11	0	3	0	—		—		14	0
Omonia	2020–21	Cypriot First Division	24	0	1	0	9	0	—		34	0
Omonia	2021–22	Cypriot First Division	22	0	4	0	7	0	1	0	34	0
Omonia	Total		57	0	8	0	16	0	1	0	82	0
Career total			287	4	27	0	64	1	5	0	383	5

== Honours ==
MŠK Žilina

- Slovak Super Liga: 2003–04, 2006–07

Zenit St. Petersburg

- Russian Premier League: 2010, 2011–12
- Russian Cup: 2009–10
- Russian Super Cup: 2008, 2011

Omonia

- Cypriot First Division: 2020–21
- Cypriot Super Cup: 2021
- Cypriot Cup: 2021–22

Slovakia

- King's Cup: 2018
