= Konstantin Zyryanov =

Russian footballer and manager

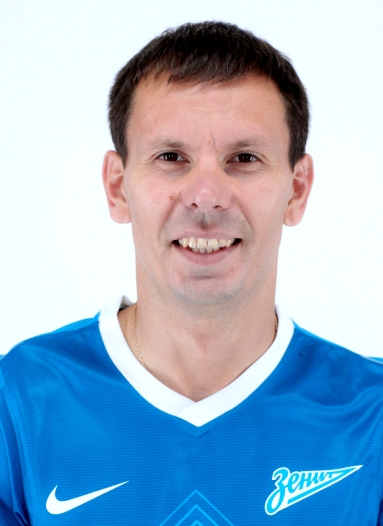
- Zyryanov at Zenit in 2014

Personal information
- Full name: Konstantin Georgiyevich Zyryanov
- Date of birth: 5 October 1977 (age 49)
- Place of birth: Perm, Russian SFSR, Soviet Union
- Height: 1.76 m (5 ft 9 in)
- Position: Midfielder

Youth career
- Zvezda Perm

Senior career*
| Years | Team | Apps | (Gls) |
| 1994–2000 | Amkar Perm | 171 | (48) |
| 2000 | Torpedo-2 Moscow | 2 | (1) |
| 2000–2007 | Torpedo Moscow | 164 | (9) |
| 2007–2017 | Zenit Saint Petersburg | 201 | (30) |
| 2014–2017 | → Zenit-2 Saint Petersburg | 87 | (10) |
| Total | | 625 | (98) |

International career
| 2006–2012 | Russia | 52 | (7) |

Managerial career
- 2017–2018: Zenit-2 Saint Petersburg
- 2018–2022: Zenit Saint Petersburg (U21)
- 2022–2023: Chernomorets Novorossiysk
- * Club domestic league appearances and goals

Konstantin Georgiyevich Zyryanov (Russian: Константин Георгиевич Зырянов; born 5 October 1977) is a Russian football manager and a former player of Komi descent.

== Club career ==
=== Early career and Amkar Perm ===
Zyryanov started to play football in local club Zvezda Perm. His professional career began with Amkar, in 1994. He played 171 league games, having scored in 48 occasions. In 1998, Zyryanov won Russian Second Division with Amkar and in 2000, he joined Torpedo Moscow.

=== Torpedo Moscow ===
Upon joining Torpedo, Zyryanov switched to their reserve team, where he played two games, scoring once. After that, he became a first squad regular. He was one of the most important Torpedo players, where he made 164 league appearances and scored nine goals. His playing ability brought him to Russian football giant Zenit Saint Petersburg in 2007.

=== Zenit Saint Petersburg ===
Zenit's late-developing holding midfielder was named Russian Footballer of the Year by Futbol and Sport-Express in 2007; in August alone he scored six league goals for Zenit.

Zyryanov also played at the back and, in addition, was used in a creative/goalscoring role by then Zenit coach Dick Advocaat. He was described as a "calm facilitator, keeping the ball moving and rarely losing possession" as he played in front of defenders.

In 2008, he scored against Bayern Munich in the semi-finals of the 2007–08 UEFA Cup to help earn his side a place in the final against Scottish club Rangers. He followed that up with the second goal in the final against Rangers to give Zenit a 2–0 victory and lift the title. Since then, Zyryanov became one of the finest Russian players, and one of the most important parts of Zenit and Russian national team.

Following the expiration of Zyryanov's Zenit contract, he signed a one-year contract with their farm club Zenit-2 St. Petersburg as a player-coach.

On 27 December 2017, he officially retired as a player and was appointed the manager of Zenit-2.

== International career ==
=== Euro 2008 ===
On 14 June 2008, Zyryanov scored for Russia in the 33rd minute of their second match in Euro 2008's Group D against Greece. Russia won the match 1–0. He was later named in the Euro 2008 Team of the tournament.

== Personal life ==
Zyryanov was struck by tragedy in August 2002 when his wife Olga, who was a drug addict, jumped from their eighth floor apartment holding the hand of his four-year-old daughter. His daughter died that evening and his wife died a month later. His father and brother died two years before that. His new partner Natalia gave birth to their first child, a boy they called Lev, on 20 September 2008. He married Natalia on 9 June 2010. Their second child, a girl named Polina, was born on 9 January 2012.

== Career statistics ==
=== Club ===
| Club | Season | League | | | Cup | | Europe | | Total | |
| Club | Season | Division | Apps | Goals | Apps | Goals | Apps | Goals | Apps | Goals |
|---|---|---|---|---|---|---|---|---|---|---|
| Amkar Perm | 1995 | Russian Third League | 24 | 8 | 0 | 0 | — | | 24 | 8 |
| Amkar Perm | 1996 | Russian Second Division | 40 | 13 | 1 | 0 | — | | 41 | 13 |
| Amkar Perm | 1997 | Russian Second Division | 38 | 4 | 1 | 1 | — | | 39 | 5 |
| Amkar Perm | 1998 | Russian Second Division | 33 | 17 | 4 | 0 | — | | 37 | 17 |
| Amkar Perm | 1999 | Russian First Division | 36 | 6 | 2 | 0 | — | | 38 | 6 |
| Amkar Perm | Total | | 171 | 48 | 8 | 1 | 0 | 0 | 179 | 49 |
| Torpedo-2 Moscow | 2000 | Russian Second Division | 2 | 1 | 0 | 0 | — | | 2 | 1 |
| Torpedo Moscow | 2000 | Russian Premier League | 5 | 3 | 2 | 1 | 1 | 0 | 8 | 4 |
| Torpedo Moscow | 2001 | Russian Premier League | 29 | 0 | 2 | 0 | 2 | 0 | 33 | 0 |
| Torpedo Moscow | 2002 | Russian Premier League | 15 | 0 | 0 | 0 | — | | 15 | 0 |
| Torpedo Moscow | 2003 | Russian Premier League | 26 | 0 | 6 | 2 | 5 | 1 | 37 | 3 |
| Torpedo Moscow | 2004 | Russian Premier League | 30 | 2 | 1 | 0 | — | | 31 | 2 |
| Torpedo Moscow | 2005 | Russian Premier League | 29 | 3 | 6 | 0 | — | | 35 | 3 |
| Torpedo Moscow | 2006 | Russian Premier League | 30 | 1 | 5 | 1 | — | | 35 | 2 |
| Torpedo Moscow | Total | | 164 | 9 | 22 | 4 | 8 | 1 | 194 | 14 |
| Zenit | 2007 | Russian Premier League | 27 | 9 | 5 | 3 | 8 | 1 | 40 | 13 |
| Zenit | 2008 | Russian Premier League | 29 | 7 | 1 | 0 | 15 | 3 | 45 | 10 |
| Zenit | 2009 | Russian Premier League | 30 | 4 | 2 | 1 | 2 | 0 | 34 | 5 |
| Zenit | 2010 | Russian Premier League | 28 | 2 | 5 | 1 | 0 | 0 | 33 | 3 |
| Zenit | 2011–12 | Russian Premier League | 41 | 1 | 2 | 0 | 8 | 1 | 51 | 2 |
| Zenit | 2012–13 | Russian Premier League | 27 | 6 | 3 | 0 | 4 | 0 | 34 | 6 |
| Zenit | 2013–14 | Russian Premier League | 19 | 1 | 2 | 0 | 8 | 0 | 29 | 1 |
| Zenit | Total | | 201 | 30 | 20 | 5 | 45 | 5 | 266 | 40 |
| Zenit-2 | 2014–15 | Russian Professional Football League | 23 | 6 | — | | — | | 23 | 6 |
| Zenit-2 | 2015–16 | Russian Football National League | 33 | 2 | — | | — | | 33 | 2 |
| Zenit-2 | 2016–17 | Russian Football National League | 28 | 2 | — | | — | | 28 | 2 |
| Zenit-2 | 2017–18 | Russian Football National League | 3 | 0 | — | | — | | 3 | 0 |
| Zenit-2 | Total | | 87 | 10 | 0 | 0 | 0 | 0 | 87 | 10 |
| Career total | | | 625 | 98 | 50 | 10 | 53 | 6 | 728 | 114 |

=== International ===
As of match played 12 June 2012

Russia
| Year | Apps | Goals |
|---|---|---|
| 2006 | 1 | 0 |
| 2007 | 8 | 0 |
| 2008 | 12 | 4 |
| 2009 | 9 | 3 |
| 2010 | 7 | 0 |
| 2011 | 9 | 0 |
| 2012 | 6 | 0 |
| Total | 52 | 7 |

=== International goals ===
Scores and results list. Russia's goal tally first:

| # | Date | Venue | Opponent | Score | Result | Competition |
|---|---|---|---|---|---|---|
| 1. | 23 May 2008 | Lokomotiv Stadium, Moscow, Russia | Kazakhstan | 3–0 | 6–0 | Friendly match |
| 2. | 4 June 2008 | Wacker Arena, Burghausen, Germany | Lithuania | 1–1 | 4–1 | Friendly match |
| 3. | 14 June 2008 | Wals Siezenheim Stadium, Salzburg, Austria | Greece | 1–0 | 1–0 | UEFA Euro 2008 |
| 4. | 20 August 2008 | Lokomotiv Stadium, Moscow, Russia | Netherlands | 1–1 | 1–1 | Friendly match |
| 5. | 28 March 2009 | Luzhniki Stadium, Moscow, Russia | Azerbaijan | 2–0 | 2–0 | 2010 FIFA World Cup qualification |
| 6. | 1 April 2009 | Rheinpark Stadion, Vaduz, Liechtenstein | Liechtenstein | 1–0 | 1–0 | 2010 FIFA World Cup qualification |
| 7. | 10 June 2009 | Helsinki Olympic Stadium, Helsinki, Finland | Finland | 3–0 | 3–0 | 2010 FIFA World Cup qualification |

== Honours ==
=== Club ===
Amkar Perm

- Russian Second Division: 1998

Zenit St. Petersburg

- Russian Premier League: 2007, 2010, 2011–12
- Russian Cup: 2009–10
- Russian Super Cup: 2008, 2011
- UEFA Cup: 2007–08
- UEFA Super Cup: 2008

=== International ===
Russia

- UEFA European Championship bronze medalist: 2008

=== Individual ===
- Russian Footballer of the Year (awarded by Futbol and Sport-Express): 2007
- Gentleman of the Year (awarded by Komsomolskaya Pravda): 2007
- UEFA Euro Team of the Tournament: 2008

=== Coaching ===
Chernomorets Novorossysk

- Russian Second League Zone 1 winner (promotion): 2022–23.
