= 2008 Russian Super Cup =

6th Russian Super Cup match

The 2008 Russian Super Cup was the 6th Russian Super Cup match, a football match which was contested between the 2007 Russian Premier League champion, Zenit Saint Petersburg, and the winner of 2006–07 Russian Cup, Lokomotiv Moscow. The match was held on 9 March 2008 at the Luzhniki Stadium in Moscow, Russia. Zenit St. Petersburg beat Lokomotiv Moscow 2–1 to win their first Russian Super Cup.

== Match details ==
9 March 2008
16:00 MSK

Zenit Saint Petersburg	2–1	Lokomotiv Moscow
Arshavin 34'; Pogrebnyak 82'	Report	Rodolfo 69'

Luzhniki, Moscow
Attendance: 48,000
Referee: Yuri Baskakov (Moscow)

Zenit St. Petersburg	Lokomotiv Moscow

ZENIT ST. PETERSBURG:
GK	16	(Russia) Vyacheslav Malafeev
DF	4	(Croatia) Ivica Križanac	(yellow card) 68' (yellow-red card) 90+'
DF	14	(Slovakia) Tomáš Hubočan	(yellow card) 81'
DF	22	(Russia) Aleksandr Anyukov
MF	11	(Czech Republic) Radek Šírl
MF	15	(Russia) Roman Shirokov
MF	18	(Russia) Konstantin Zyryanov	(yellow card) 55'
MF	20	(Russia) Viktor Fayzulin		(substituted off) 72'
MF	44	(Ukraine) Anatoliy Tymoschuk (c)
FW	8	(Russia) Pavel Pogrebnyak
FW	10	(Russia) Andrei Arshavin	(yellow card) 69'
Substitutes:
GK	1	(Slovakia) Kamil Čontofalský
MF	2	(Russia) Vladislav Radimov	(red card) 79'
MF	17	(South Korea) Lee Ho
MF	25	(Netherlands) Fernando Ricksen
MF	27	(Russia) Igor Denisov		(substituted in) 72'
MF	57	(Russia) Aleksei Ionov
MF	88	(Ukraine) Olexandr Gorshkov
Manager:
(Netherlands) Dick Advocaat Assistant referees: (Russia) Tikhon Kalugin (Russia) Anton Averyanov; Fourth official: (Russia) Aleksei Nikolaev

LOKOMOTIV MOSCOW:
GK	1	(Russia) Ivan Levenets
DF	4	(Brazil) Rodolfo	(yellow card) 90+'
DF	5	(Bosnia and Herzegovina) Emir Spahić
DF	17	(Russia) Dmitri Sennikov
DF	41	(Belarus) Sergei Gurenko	(yellow card) 53'
MF	10	(Georgia (country)) Davit Mujiri		(substituted off) 46'
MF	55	(Russia) Renat Yanbayev
MF	63	(Russia) Diniyar Bilyaletdinov (c)		(substituted off) 88'
FW	9	(Nigeria) Peter Odemwingie
FW	11	(Russia) Dmitri Sychev
FW	25	(Romania) Răzvan Cociş
Substitutes:
GK	21	(Russia) Aleksei Poliakov
DF	15	(Brazil) Fininho
DF	99	(Russia) Taras Burlak
MF	7	(Russia) Dmitri Torbinsky	(yellow card) 73' (yellow-red card) 79'	(substituted in) 46'
MF	8	(Russia) Vladimir Maminov
MF	58	(Russia) Denis Glushakov
FW	19	(Mali) Dramane Traoré		(substituted in) 88'
Manager:
(Tajikistan) Rashid Rakhimov

== See also ==
- 2008 in Russian football
- 2007 Russian Premier League
- 2006–07 Russian Cup
