= Aleksandar Luković =

Serbian footballer (born 1982)

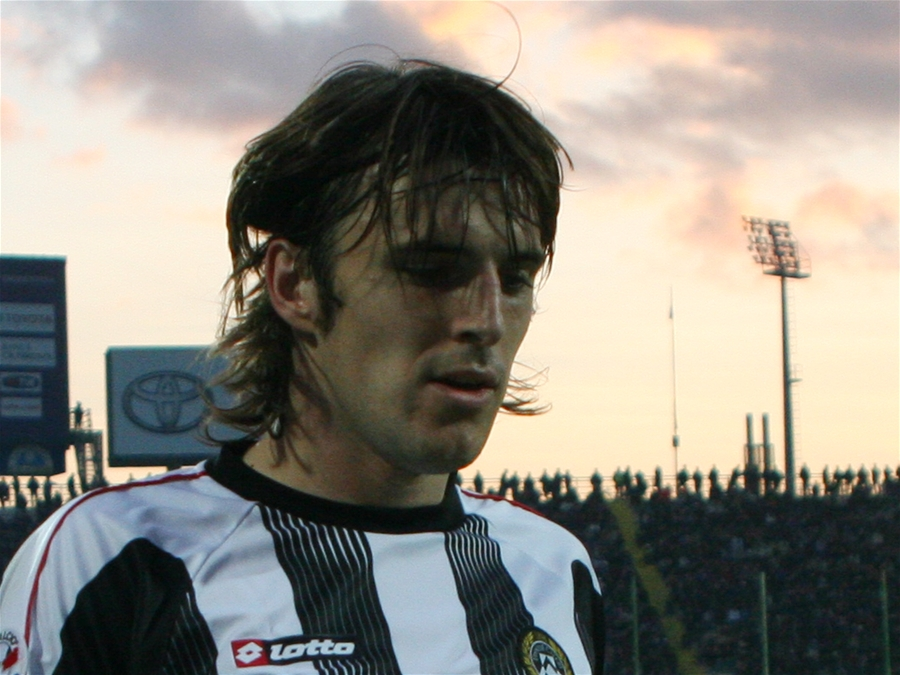
- Luković with Udinese in 2007

Personal information
- Date of birth: 23 October 1982 (age 44)
- Place of birth: Kraljevo, SR Serbia, SFR Yugoslavia
- Height: 1.85 m (6 ft 1 in)
- Positions: Centre-back; left-back

Youth career
- Red Star Belgrade

Senior career*
| Years | Team | Apps | (Gls) |
| 1999–2002 | Sloga Kraljevo | 42 | (3) |
| 2002–2006 | Red Star Belgrade | 64 | (3) |
| 2003–2004 | → Jedinstvo Ub (loan) | 23 | (2) |
| 2006–2010 | Udinese | 97 | (0) |
| 2006 | → Ascoli (loan) | 10 | (0) |
| 2010–2014 | Zenit Saint Petersburg | 40 | (1) |
| 2012–2014 | → Zenit-2 Saint Petersburg (loan) | 28 | (2) |
| 2015–2017 | Red Star Belgrade | 56 | (6) |
| Total | | 360 | (17) |

International career
| 2005–2012 | Serbia (Note: Including 5 caps for Serbia and Montenegro) | 28 | (0) |

Managerial career
- 2021–2022: Serbia U16
- 2022–2023: Serbia U17
- 2023–2025: Serbia U19
- 2025: Radnički 1923
- * Club domestic league appearances and goals

Aleksandar Luković (Serbian Cyrillic: Александар Луковић; born 23 October 1982) is a Serbian football manager and former player who played as a defender. He appeared in the 2010 FIFA World Cup.

== Club career ==
=== Early career ===
Luković started his career at hometown club Sloga Kraljevo. He transferred to Red Star Belgrade in 2002. Luković played his first UEFA Cup match the same year on 15 August, replacing Nemanja Vidić in the second half. Crvena Zvezda won 2–0 against FC Kairat.

In mid-2006, after signing a pre-contract with Udinese, Luković moved to Ascoli on loan from Red Star Belgrade in order for the club to borrow the non-EU registration quota of Ascoli for Udinese. He moved to Udinese from Ascoli on loan in January transfer window.

On 27 January 2007, Luković played his first Serie A match for Udinese against Torino. He was signed permanently in mid-2007 by Udinese from Red Star.

=== Zenit Saint Petersburg ===
On 29 July 2010, Luković signed a four-year contract with Zenit Saint Petersburg for an undisclosed fee. He was a constant starter for the team, but eventually got reduced playing time with the arrival of Domenico Criscito to the club for the left-back position.

=== Return to Red Star Belgrade ===
After several transfer windows of rumors regarding his return, Luković re-signed for Red Star Belgrade on a three-year contract on 29 December 2014. On 6 February 2015, in a friendly match against Rubin Kazan, he suffered an injury which sidelined him until summer 2015. On 23 August 2015, Luković finally made his first appearance for Red Star since his injury, and was applauded by the whole stadium when he came in as a substitute for Savo Pavićević. After the end of contract with club in summer 2017, Luković left as a free agent. The same year in July, Luković retired from professional football.

== International career ==
Luković made his international debut in a friendly match against Poland on 15 August 2005. He played a part during 2010 World Cup qualifying and mostly partnered with Nemanja Vidić in central defense as Aleksandar Kolarov was preferred at left back.

In June 2010, he was selected in Serbia's squad for the 2010 FIFA World Cup, where he appeared in group stage matches against Ghana and Australia. He was sent off in Serbia's opening match against Ghana on 13 June 2010.

In March 2011, two weeks before a crucial Euro 2012 qualifying against Northern Ireland, Luković retired international football at the age of 28, citing his desire to focus on his then-club, Zenit. On the same occasion, his teammate Danko Lazović also made the same announcement. He earned a total of 27 caps without goals.

== Managerial career ==
On 8 August 2025, Luković was appointed as manager of Radnički 1923, replacing Feđa Dudić He was sacked the same year on 20 October.

== Career statistics ==
=== Club ===
Appearances and goals by club, season and competition
| Club | Season | League | | Cup | | Continental | | Other | | Total | |
| Club | Season | Apps | Goals | Apps | Goals | Apps | Goals | Apps | Goals | Apps | Goals |
|---|---|---|---|---|---|---|---|---|---|---|---|
| Sloga Kraljevo | 1998–99 | 1 | 0 | | | 0 | 0 | 0 | 0 | 1 | 0 |
| Sloga Kraljevo | 1999–00 | 12 | 1 | | | 0 | 0 | 0 | 0 | 11 | 1 |
| Sloga Kraljevo | 2000–01 | 14 | 1 | | | 0 | 0 | 0 | 0 | 14 | 1 |
| Sloga Kraljevo | 2001–02 | 15 | 1 | | | 0 | 0 | 0 | 0 | 15 | 3 |
| Sloga Kraljevo | Total | 49 | 5 | | | 0 | 0 | 0 | 0 | 49 | 5 |
| Red Star Belgrade | 2001–02 | 6 | 0 | | | 0 | 0 | 0 | 0 | 6 | 0 |
| Red Star Belgrade | 2002–03 | 6 | 0 | | | 1 | 0 | 0 | 0 | 7 | 0 |
| Red Star Belgrade | 2004–05 | 25 | 0 | | | 5 | 0 | 0 | 0 | 30 | 0 |
| Red Star Belgrade | 2005–06 | 27 | 3 | | | 8 | 0 | 0 | 0 | 35 | 3 |
| Red Star Belgrade | Total | 64 | 3 | | | 14 | 0 | 0 | 0 | 78 | 3 |
| Jedinstvo Ub (loan) | 2003–04 | 23 | 2 | | | 0 | 0 | 0 | 0 | 23 | 2 |
| Ascoli | 2006–07 | 10 | 0 | 2 | 0 | 0 | 0 | 0 | 0 | 12 | 0 |
| Udinese | 2006–07 | 5 | 0 | 0 | 0 | 0 | 0 | 0 | 0 | 5 | 0 |
| Udinese | 2007–08 | 32 | 0 | 4 | 0 | 0 | 0 | 0 | 0 | 36 | 0 |
| Udinese | 2008–09 | 27 | 0 | 1 | 0 | 7 | 0 | 0 | 0 | 35 | 0 |
| Udinese | 2009–10 | 33 | 0 | 2 | 0 | 0 | 0 | 0 | 0 | 35 | 0 |
| Udinese | Total | 97 | 0 | 7 | 0 | 7 | 0 | 0 | 0 | 111 | 0 |
| Zenit Saint Petersburg | 2010 | 11 | 0 | 2 | 0 | 9 | 0 | 0 | 0 | 22 | 0 |
| Zenit Saint Petersburg | 2011–12 | 19 | 1 | 1 | 0 | 0 | 0 | 1 | 0 | 21 | 1 |
| Zenit Saint Petersburg | 2012–13 | 9 | 0 | 2 | 0 | 1 | 0 | 1 | 0 | 13 | 0 |
| Zenit Saint Petersburg | 2013–14 | 1 | 0 | 0 | 0 | 1 | 0 | 1 | 1 | 3 | 0 |
| Zenit Saint Petersburg | Total | 40 | 1 | 5 | 0 | 11 | 0 | 3 | 0 | 59 | 1 |
| Red Star Belgrade | 2014–15 | 0 | 0 | 0 | 0 | 0 | 0 | 0 | 0 | 0 | 0 |
| Red Star Belgrade | 2015–16 | 28 | 1 | 2 | 0 | 0 | 0 | 0 | 0 | 30 | 1 |
| Red Star Belgrade | 2016–17 | 28 | 5 | 4 | 2 | 1 | 0 | 0 | 0 | 33 | 7 |
| Red Star Belgrade | Total | 56 | 6 | 6 | 2 | 1 | 0 | 0 | 0 | 63 | 8 |
| Career total | | 360 | 17 | 20 | 2 | 33 | 0 | 3 | 0 | 422 | 20 |

=== International ===
Appearances and goals by national team and year
| National team | Year | Apps | Goals |
|---|---|---|---|
| Serbia | 2005 | 5 | 0 |
| Serbia | 2006 | 3 | 0 |
| Serbia | 2007 | 0 | 0 |
| Serbia | 2008 | 3 | 0 |
| Serbia | 2009 | 7 | 0 |
| Serbia | 2010 | 9 | 0 |
| Serbia | 2011 | 0 | 0 |
| Serbia | 2012 | 1 | 0 |
| Total | | 28 | 0 |

== Managerial statistics ==
As of match played 18 October 2025

Managerial record by team and tenure
| Team | From | To | Record | | | | |
| Team | From | To | P | W | D | L | Win % |
|---|---|---|---|---|---|---|---|
| Serbia U16 | 7 July 2021 | 30 June 2022 | 8 | 7 | 1 | 0 | 87.50 |
| Serbia U17 | 7 July 2022 | 7 August 2025 | 24 | 14 | 2 | 8 | 58.33 |
| Radnički 1923 | 8 August 2025 | 20 October 2025 | 10 | 3 | 3 | 4 | 30.00 |
| Total | | | 42 | 24 | 6 | 12 | 57.14 |

== Honours ==
Red Star Belgrade

- Serbian SuperLiga: 2005–06, 2015–16
- Serbian Cup: 2001–02, 2005–06

Zenit Saint Petersburg

- Russian Premier League: 2010, 2011–12
- Russian Super Cup: 2011

Individual

- Serbian SuperLiga Team of the Season: 2015–16
