= 2011 Russian Super Cup =

- Event: 2011 Russian Super Cup
Zenit Saint Petersburg	CSKA Moscow
1	0
- Date: 6 March 2011
- Venue: Kuban Stadium, Krasnodar
- Referee: Aleksei Nikolayev (Moscow)
- Attendance: 22,500

The 2011 Russian Football Super Cup (Russian: Суперкубок России по футболу) was the 9th Russian Super Cup match, a football match which was contested between the 2010 Russian Premier League champion and 2009–10 Russian Cup champion, Zenit Saint Petersburg, and the runner-up of 2010 Russian Premier League, CSKA Moscow. The match was held on 6 March 2011 at the Kuban Stadium in Krasnodar, Russia of which Zenit St. Petersburg won that match.

== Match details ==
6 March 2011
13:00 MSK

Zenit Saint Petersburg	1–0	CSKA Moscow
Ionov 57'	Report

Kuban Stadium, Krasnodar
Attendance: 22,500
Referee: Aleksei Nikolayev (Moscow)

Zenit	CSKA

GK	16	(Russia) Vyacheslav Malafeev (c)
DF	2	(Russia) Aleksandr Anyukov
DF	3	(Portugal) Bruno Alves
DF	5	(Portugal) Fernando Meira
DF	24	(Serbia) Aleksandar Luković
MF	10	(Portugal) Danny	(yellow card) 55'
MF	15	(Russia) Roman Shirokov
MF	18	(Russia) Konstantin Zyryanov
MF	25	(Russia) Sergei Semak		(substituted off) 83'
MF	27	(Russia) Igor Denisov	(yellow card) 7'
FW	8	(Serbia) Danko Lazović		(substituted off) 55'
Substitutes:
GK	30	(Belarus) Yuri Zhevnov
DF	50	(Russia) Igor Cheminava
MF	20	(Russia) Viktor Fayzulin
MF	23	(Hungary) Szabolcs Huszti		(substituted in) 83'
MF	57	(Russia) Aleksei Ionov		(substituted in) 55'
Manager:
(Italy) Luciano Spalletti Assistant referees: Aleksei Lebedev (Saint Petersburg); Viktor Kulagin (Moscow); Fourth official: Vladislav Bezborodov (Saint Petersburg)

GK	35	(Russia) Igor Akinfeev (c)
DF	4	(Russia) Sergei Ignashevich	(yellow card) 18'
DF	14	(Russia) Kirill Nababkin
DF	24	(Russia) Vasili Berezutski
DF	42	(Russia) Georgi Shchennikov
MF	7	(Japan) Keisuke Honda
MF	10	(Russia) Alan Dzagoev	(yellow card) 31'	(substituted off) 80'
MF	17	(Russia) Pavel Mamaev
MF	22	(Russia) Evgeni Aldonin
FW	8	(Ivory Coast) Seydou Doumbia
FW	9	(Brazil) Vagner Love
Substitutes:
GK	1	(Russia) Sergey Chepchugov
DF	2	(Lithuania) Deividas Šemberas
DF	6	(Russia) Aleksei Berezutski
MF	25	(Bosnia and Herzegovina) Elvir Rahimić
FW	89	(Czech Republic) Tomáš Necid		(substituted in) 80'
Manager:
(Russia) Leonid Slutsky
