= Aleksandr Anyukov =

Russian footballer

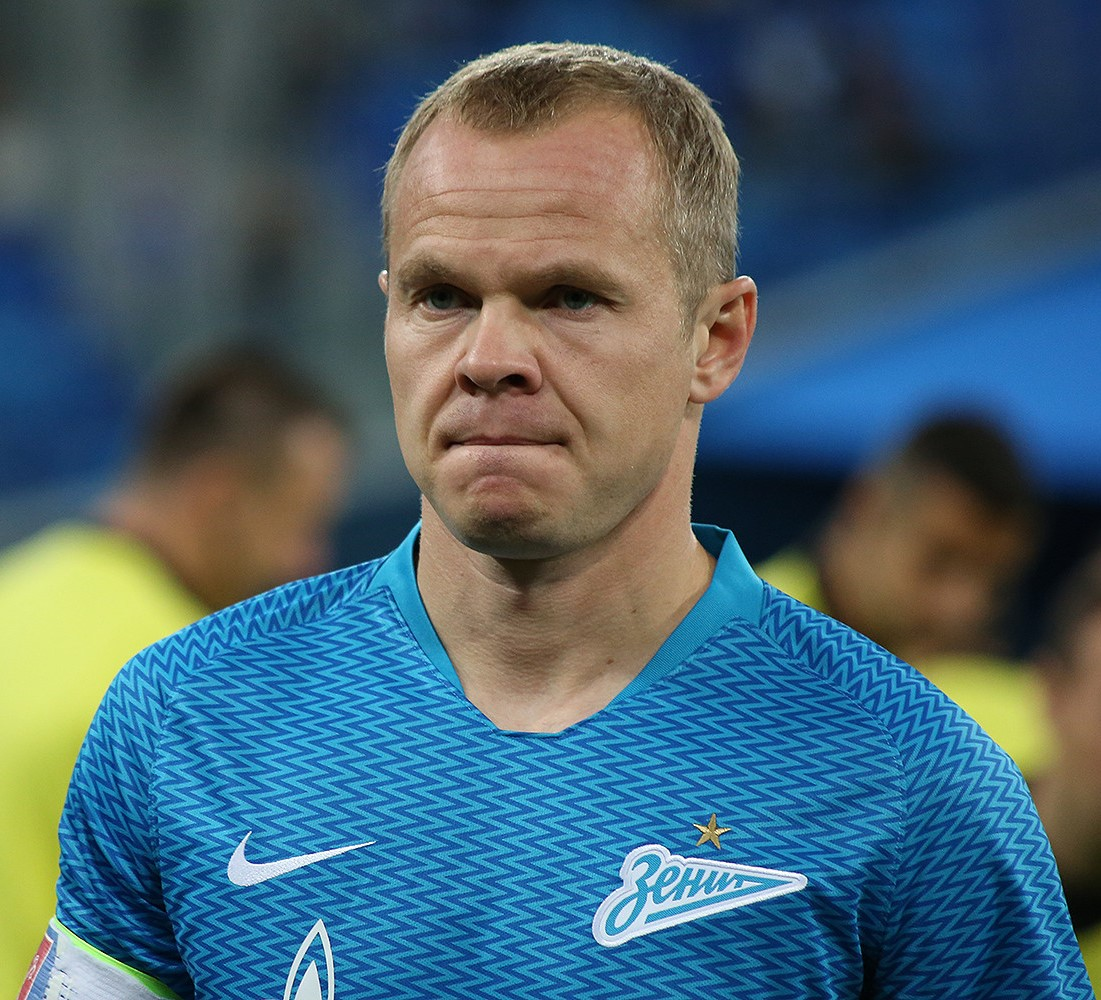
- Anyukov with Zenit in 2018

Personal information
- Full name: Aleksandr Gennadyevich Anyukov
- Date of birth: 28 September 1982 (age 44)
- Place of birth: Kuibyshev, Soviet Union
- Height: 1.78 m (5 ft 10 in)
- Position: Right back

Team information
- Current team: FC Zenit Saint Petersburg (assistant coach)

Senior career*
Years	Team	Apps	(Gls)
2000	Krylia Sovetov-2 Samara	18	(1)
2000–2005	Krylia Sovetov Samara	71	(3)
2005–2020	Zenit St. Petersburg	272	(11)
2018	→ Zenit-2 St. Petersburg	6	(1)
2019–2020	→ Krylia Sovetov Samara (loan)	18	(0)

International career
2003	Russia U-21	4	(0)
2003	Russia-2	2	(0)
2004–2013	Russia	79	(1)

Managerial career
- 2019: FC Zenit Saint Petersburg (assistant)
- 2020–: FC Zenit Saint Petersburg (assistant)
- * Club domestic league appearances and goals

Aleksandr Gennadyevich Anyukov (Russian: Александр Геннадьевич Анюков; born 28 September 1982) is a Russian association football coach and a former player, who played as a right-back. He is an assistant coach with FC Zenit Saint Petersburg.

He made his senior debut in 2004, represented his nation for two European Championships and earned over 70 international appearances. He won the Russian Premier League with Zenit Saint Petersburg 5 times.

== Club career ==
Aleksandr Anyukov attended football school in Samara since the age of six. In 2000, he started playing for the reserve team of Krylia Sovetov Samara in the Second Division. He was noticed by Aleksandr Tarkhanov and invited to the first team. Anyukov debuted in the Russian Premier League on 14 October 2000 in a match against Zenit Saint Petersburg. He has played in Krylia Sovetov until mid-2005. During this time he became an international player. He has also appeared at Euro 2004.

In July 2005 Anyukov transferred to Zenit Saint Petersburg. He reached the quarterfinal of UEFA Cup 2005-06 and then won the UEFA Cup 2007-08 with them.

On 25 June 2019, Zenit announced that Anyukov has joined the team's coaching staff. On 14 July 2019 Anyukov came out of retirement to join Krylia Sovetov Samara on loan for the 2019–20 season.

On 28 May 2020, Krylia Sovetov announced that, despite the season being extended into July due to the COVID-19 pandemic in Russia, Anyukov's contract will not be extended and expire as originally planned on 31 May, and that he will return to Zenit to rejoin their coaching staff.

== International ==
Anyukov made his international debut in May 2004 against Austria. He scored his first international goal in 2005 against Germany. Later Anyukov was called up to Russia's squad for Euro 2008. He was confirmed for the finalized UEFA Euro 2012 squad on 25 May 2012.

== Career statistics ==
=== Club ===
Club	Season	League		Cup		Europe		Total	
Club	Season	Apps	Goals	Apps	Goals	Apps	Goals	Apps	Goals
Krylia Sovetov-2	2000	18	1	0	0	—		18	1
Krylia Sovetov-2	Total	18	1	0	0	—		18	1
Krylia Sovetov	2000	4	0	2	1	—		6	1
Krylia Sovetov	2001	3	0	2	0	—		5	0
Krylia Sovetov	2002	2	1	1	0	—		3	1
Krylia Sovetov	2003	18	0	6	0	—		24	0
Krylia Sovetov	2004	29	2	7	0	—		36	2
Krylia Sovetov	2005	15	0	4	0	—		19	0
Krylia Sovetov	Total	71	3	22	1	—		93	4
Zenit	2005	12	1	1	0	8	0	21	1
Zenit	2006	25	1	6	0	6	0	37	1
Zenit	2007	23	2	6	0	8	0	37	2
Zenit	2008	26	3	0	0	15	1	41	4
Zenit	2009	27	1	2	0	5	0	34	1
Zenit	2010	27	1	3	0	6	0	36	1
Zenit	2011–12	37	1	5	0	11	0	53	1
Zenit	2012–13	22	1	4	0	9	0	35	1
Zenit	2013–14	14	0	2	0	6	0	22	0
Zenit	2014–15	17	0	2	0	9	0	28	0
Zenit	2015–16	15	0	3	0	7	0	25	0
Zenit	2016–17	10	0	2	0	4	0	16	0
Zenit	2017–18	1	0	1	0	2	0	4	0
Zenit	2018–19	16	0	2	1	10	0	28	1
Zenit	Total	272	11	39	1	106	1	417	13
Zenit-2	2017–18	6	1	—		—		6	1
Krylia Sovetov	2019–20	18	0	0	0	—		18	0
Career total		385	16	61	2	106	1	552	19

=== International goals ===
No.	Date	Venue	Opponent	Score	Result	Competition
1	2005-06-08	Borussia-Park, Mönchengladbach, Germany	Germany	1 – 0	2–2	Friendly

== Honours ==
=== Club ===
Zenit Saint-Peterburg

- UEFA Cup: 2007–08
- Russian Premier League: 2007, 2010, 2011–12, 2014–15, 2018–19
- Russian Cup: 2009-10, 2015-16
- UEFA Super Cup: 2008
- Russian Super Cup: 2008, 2011, 2015, 2016

=== International ===
Russia

- UEFA European Championship bronze medalist: 2008
