= Nicolás Peñailillo =

Chilean footballer (born 1991)

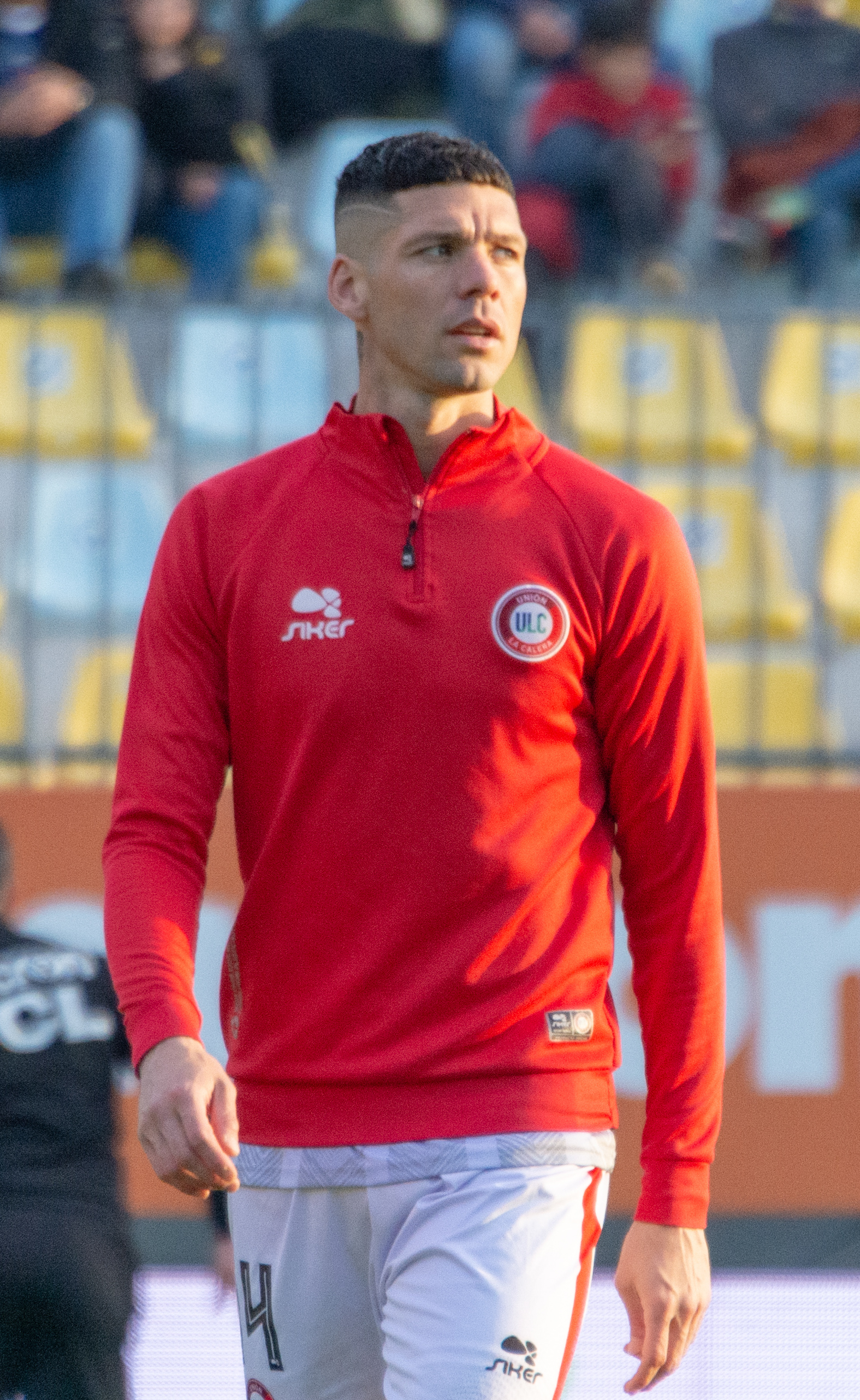
- Peñailillo with Unión La Calera in 2023

Personal information
- Full name: Nicolás Ignacio Peñailillo Acuña
- Date of birth: 13 June 1991 (age 35)
- Place of birth: Viña del Mar, Chile
- Height: 1.84 m (6 ft 1/2 in)
- Position: Left-back

Youth career
- Everton

Senior career*
| Years | Team | Apps | (Gls) |
| 2010–2016 | Everton | 149 | (15) |
| 2011 | → Zenit Saint Petersburg (loan) | 0 | (0) |
| 2017–2018 | Deportes Iquique | 30 | (1) |
| 2019–2021 | Deportes Antofagasta | 47 | (3) |
| 2021–2022 | Unión Santa Fe | 21 | (1) |
| 2022 | Deportes Antofagasta | 10 | (0) |
| 2023 | Unión La Calera | 11 | (0) |
| 2024 | Unión Española | 12 | (0) |
| 2025 | Deportes Limache | 18 | (0) |
| Total | | 298 | (20) |

International career
| 2011 | Chile U20 | 4 | (0) |
- * Club domestic league appearances and goals

Nicolás Ignacio Peñailillo Acuña (born 13 June 1991) is a Chilean former football who played as a left-back.

== Club career ==
In the second half of 2022, Peñailillo returned to Chile after his step in Argentina and joined Deportes Antofagasta.

In 2024, Peñailillo joined Unión Española from Unión La Calera. The next year, he joined Deportes Limache.

Peñailillo announced his retirement on 27 July 2026.

== Personal life ==
He is the son-in-law of former Chile international footballer, Javier Margas.
