= Aleksei Ionov =

Russian footballer (born 1989)

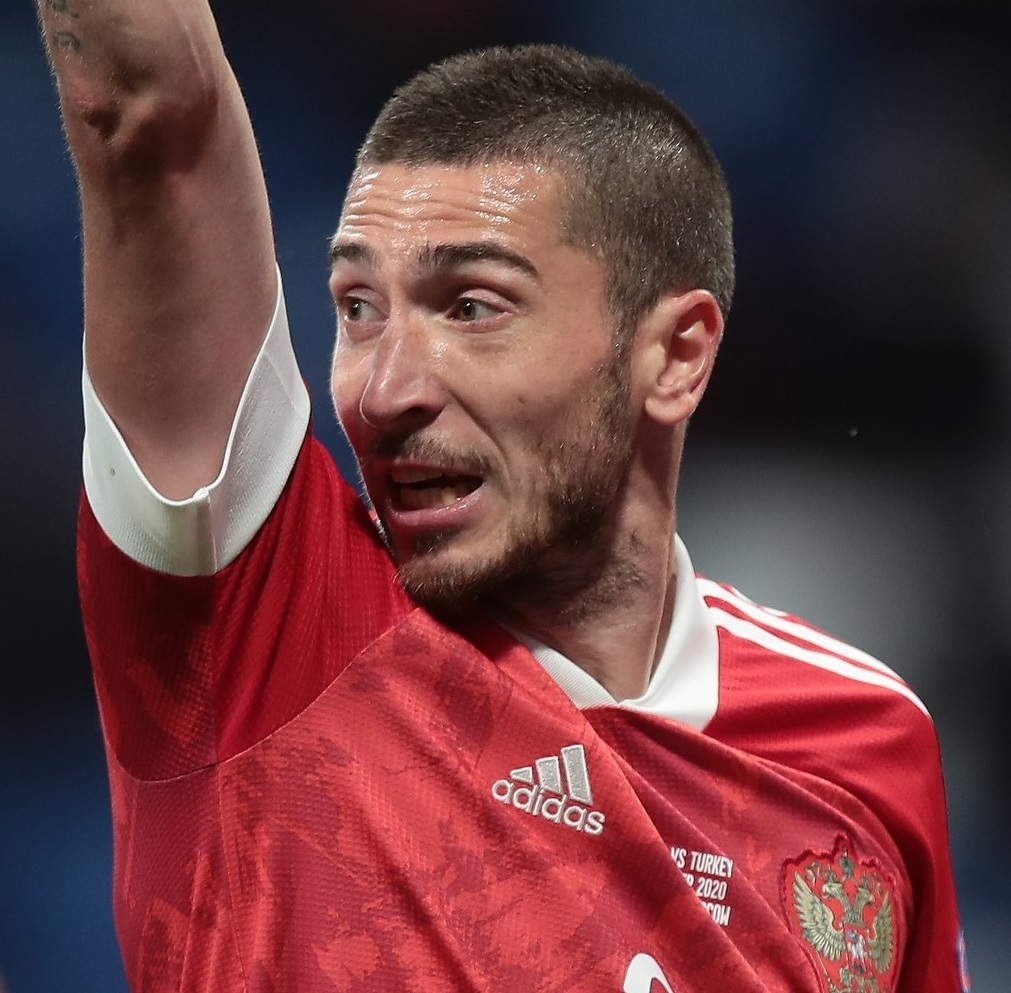
- Ionov with Russia in 2020

Personal information
- Full name: Aleksei Sergeyevich Ionov
- Date of birth: 18 February 1989 (age 37)
- Place of birth: Kingisepp, Russian SFSR, Soviet Union
- Height: 1.77 m (5 ft 10 in)
- Position: Winger

Youth career
- –2007: Zenit Saint Petersburg

Senior career*
Years	Team	Apps	(Gls)
2007–2012	Zenit Saint Petersburg	46	(3)
2012–2013	Kuban Krasnodar	37	(3)
2013	Anzhi Makhachkala	6	(0)
2013–2017	Dynamo Moscow	81	(18)
2016–2017	→ CSKA Moscow (loan)	24	(3)
2017–2020	Rostov	80	(18)
2020–2023	Krasnodar	70	(13)
2023	Rostov	14	(0)
2024	Ural Yekaterinburg	30	(5)
Total		388	(62)

International career
2006	Russia U-17	11	(4)
2007–2008	Russia U-19	9	(2)
2009–2010	Russia U-21	12	(1)
2011–2012	Russia-2	5	(4)
2011–2021	Russia	39	(4)

Managerial career
- 2025–2026: SSOR Zenit
- * Club domestic league appearances and goals

Aleksei Sergeyevich Ionov (Russian: Алексей Сергеевич Ионов; born 18 February 1989) is a Russian former professional footballer who played as a winger. He could play on the left flank or the right.

== Club career ==
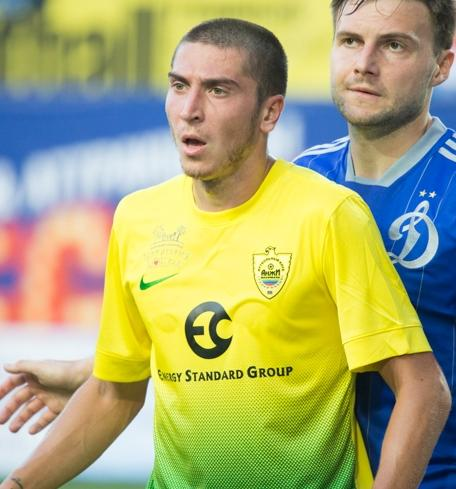
Ionov with Anzhi in 2013

He started playing football at the age of six. Later he graduated from SCYSSOR Zenit, and started playing for Zenit Reserves in 2007.

On 3 June 2013, Ionov moved to Anzhi Makhachkala for 5 million euros.

In June 2016, Ionov moved to CSKA Moscow on a season-long loan.

On 31 August 2017, he signed a 3-year contract with Rostov.

On 15 October 2020, he moved to Krasnodar and signed a 2.5-year contract with the club. Ionov left Krasnodar in June 2023.

On 20 June 2023, Ionov returned to Rostov on a two-year deal. The contract was terminated by mutual consent on 14 December 2023.

On 22 February 2024, Ionov signed with Ural Yekaterinburg.

== International career ==
Ionov was a part of the Russia U-21 side that competed in the 2011 European Under-21 Championship qualification.

He made his senior national team debut on 29 March 2011 in a friendly against Qatar. He played his first competitive national team game in the 2014 FIFA World Cup qualifier against Luxembourg on 6 September 2013.

On 2 June 2014, he was included in the Russia's 2014 FIFA World Cup squad.

After a two-year break, he was called up for games against Turkey and Czech Republic in September 2018. He scored his first two goals for the national squad on 10 September 2018 in a friendly against the Czech Republic which was played at his club's home stadium, Rostov Arena.

On 11 May 2021, he was included in the preliminary extended 30-man squad for UEFA Euro 2020. On 2 June 2021, he was included in the final squad. He did not appear in any games as Russia was eliminated at group stage.

== Career statistics ==
=== Club ===
As of match played 14 July 2024

Appearances and goals by club, season and competition
Club	Season	League			Russian Cup		Europe		Other		Total	
Club	Season	Division	Apps	Goals	Apps	Goals	Apps	Goals	Apps	Goals	Apps	Goals
Zenit Saint Petersburg	2007	Russian Premier League	0	0	1	0	3	2	—		4	2
Zenit Saint Petersburg	2008	Russian Premier League	5	0	1	0	1	0	—		7	0
Zenit Saint Petersburg	2009	Russian Premier League	10	0	1	0	0	0	—		11	0
Zenit Saint Petersburg	2010	Russian Premier League	11	0	1	0	5	2	—		17	2
Zenit Saint Petersburg	2011–12	Russian Premier League	20	3	2	1	4	0	1 (Note: Appearance in Russian Super Cup)	1	27	5
Zenit Saint Petersburg	Total		46	3	6	1	13	4	1	1	66	9
Kuban Krasnodar	2011–12	Russian Premier League	7	1	0	0	—		—		7	1
Kuban Krasnodar	2012–13	Russian Premier League	30	2	2	0	—		—		32	2
Kuban Krasnodar	Total		37	3	2	0	—		—		39	3
Anzhi Makhachkala	2013–14	Russian Premier League	6	0	0	0	—		—		6	0
Dynamo Moscow	2013–14	Russian Premier League	18	5	0	0	—		—		18	5
Dynamo Moscow	2014–15	Russian Premier League	29	9	1	0	14	4	—		44	13
Dynamo Moscow	2015–16	Russian Premier League	29	4	3	0	—		—		32	4
Dynamo Moscow	2017–18	Russian Premier League	5	0	0	0	—		—		5	0
Dynamo Moscow	Total		81	18	4	0	14	4	0	0	99	22
CSKA Moscow (loan)	2016–17	Russian Premier League	24	3	1	0	3	0	1	0	29	3
Rostov	2017–18	Russian Premier League	21	5	1	0	—		—		22	5
Rostov	2018–19	Russian Premier League	25	6	5	0	—		—		30	6
Rostov	2019–20	Russian Premier League	25	6	0	0	—		—		25	6
Rostov	2020–21	Russian Premier League	9	1	—		1	0	—		10	1
Rostov	Total		80	18	6	0	1	0	0	0	87	18
Krasnodar	2020–21	Russian Premier League	19	4	1	0	2	0	—		22	4
Krasnodar	2021–22	Russian Premier League	24	2	1	0	—		—		25	2
Krasnodar	2022–23	Russian Premier League	27	7	11	0	—		—		38	7
Krasnodar	Total		70	13	13	0	2	0	0	0	85	13
Rostov	2023–24	Russian Premier League	14	0	3	0	–		–		17	0
Ural	2023–24	Russian Premier League	12	3	3	0	–		2 (Note: Appearances in the relegation play-offs)	0	17	3
Ural	2024–25	Russian First League	1	0	0	0	—		—		1	0
Ural	Total		13	3	3	0	—		2	0	18	3
Career total			371	61	38	1	33	8	4	1	446	71

=== International ===
As of match played 19 November 2019

Appearances and goals by national team and year
National team	Year	Apps	Goals
Russia	2011	1	0
Russia	2012	0	0
Russia	2013	2	0
Russia	2014	5	0
Russia	2015	2	0
Russia	2016	1	0
Russia	2017	0	0
Russia	2018	6	2
Russia	2019	9	2
Total		26	4

=== International goals ===
As of match played 19 November 2019. Russia score listed first, score column indicates score after each Ionov goal.

International goals by date, venue, cap, opponent, score, result and competition
No.	Date	Venue	Cap	Opponent	Score	Result	Competition
1	10 September 2018	Rostov Arena, Rostov-on-Don, Russia	13	Czech Republic	1–0	5–1	Friendly
2	10 September 2018	Rostov Arena, Rostov-on-Don, Russia	13	Czech Republic	3–0	5–1	Friendly
3	11 June 2019	Nizhny Novgorod Stadium, Nizhny Novgorod, Russia	20	Cyprus	1–0	1–0	UEFA Euro 2020 qualification
4	19 November 2019	San Marino Stadium, Serravalle, San Marino	26	San Marino	4–0	5–0	UEFA Euro 2020 qualification

== Honours ==
Zenit St. Petersburg

- UEFA Cup: 2007–08
- Russian Super Cup: 2008, 2011
- Russian Cup: 2009–10
- Russian Premier League: 2010
