= Igor Cheminava =

Russian footballer (born 1991)

Personal information
- Full name: Igor Revdikovich Cheminava
- Date of birth: 23 March 1991 (age 35)
- Place of birth: Leningrad, Russian SFSR, Soviet Union
- Height: 1.86 m (6 ft 1 in)
- Position: Defender

Youth career
- 1998–2011: Zenit Saint Petersburg

Senior career*
| Years | Team | Apps | (Gls) |
| 2011–2013 | Zenit Saint Petersburg | 4 | (0) |
| 2012 | → Sibir Novosibirsk (loan) | 5 | (1) |
| 2013–2014 | Dynamo Saint Petersburg | 0 | (0) |
| 2014–2015 | Sillamäe Kalev | 51 | (5) |
| 2016–2017 | Vityaz Podolsk | 24 | (3) |
| 2017 | KuPS | 3 | (0) |
| 2018–2019 | Junior Sevan | 7 | (5) |

International career
| 2009–2010 | Russia U-19 | 9 | (2) |
| 2010–2012 | Russia U-21 | 3 | (0) |
- * Club domestic league appearances and goals

Igor Revdikovich Cheminava (Russian: Игорь Ревдикович Чеминава, Georgian: იგორ ჩემინავა; born 23 March 1991) is a Russian former professional footballer who played as a defender.

== Club career ==
Cheminava made his debut for the main Zenit Saint Petersburg squad on 13 March 2011 in a Russian Premier League game against Terek Grozny.

== Career statistics ==
As of 13 May 2025

Appearances and goals by club, season and competition
| Club | Season | League | | | National cup (Note: Includes Russian Cup, Estonian Cup, Suomen Cup, Armenian Independence Cup) | | Continental | | Total | |
| Club | Season | Division | Apps | Goals | Apps | Goals | Apps | Goals | Apps | Goals |
|---|---|---|---|---|---|---|---|---|---|---|
| Zenit | 2009 | Russian Premier League | 0 | 0 | 0 | 0 | 0 | 0 | 0 | 0 |
| Zenit | 2010 | Russian Premier League | 3 | 0 | 0 | 0 | 0 | 0 | 3 | 0 |
| Zenit | 2011–12 | Russian Premier League | 0 | 0 | 1 | 0 | 0 | 0 | 1 | 0 |
| Zenit | 2012–13 | Russian Premier League | 1 | 0 | 0 | 0 | 0 | 0 | 1 | 0 |
| Zenit | Total | | 4 | 0 | 1 | 0 | 0 | 0 | 5 | 0 |
| Sibir Novosibirsk (loan) | 2011–12 | Russian First League | 5 | 1 | – | | – | | 5 | 1 |
| Sillamäe Kalev | 2014 | Meistriliiga | 20 | 1 | 4 | 4 | 4 (Note: Appearances in UEFA Europa League) | 0 | 29 | 5 |
| Sillamäe Kalev | 2015 | Meistriliiga | 31 | 4 | 2 | 0 | 2 | 0 | 35 | 4 |
| Sillamäe Kalev | Total | | 51 | 5 | 6 | 4 | 6 | 0 | 63 | 9 |
| Vityaz Podolsk | 2015–16 | Russian Second League | 8 | 1 | – | | – | | 8 | 1 |
| Vityaz Podolsk | 2016–17 | Russian Second League | 16 | 2 | 2 | 1 | – | | 18 | 3 |
| Vityaz Podolsk | Total | | 24 | 3 | 2 | 1 | 0 | 0 | 26 | 4 |
| KuPS | 2017 | Veikkausliiga | 3 | 0 | 0 | 0 | – | | 3 | 0 |
| KuFu-98 | 2017 | Kakkonen | 1 | 0 | – | | – | | 1 | 0 |
| Junior Sevan | 2018–19 | Armenian First League | 7 | 5 | 2 | 0 | – | | 9 | 5 |
| Career total | | | 95 | 14 | 11 | 5 | 6 | 0 | 112 | 19 |
