= Viktor Fayzulin =

Russian footballer

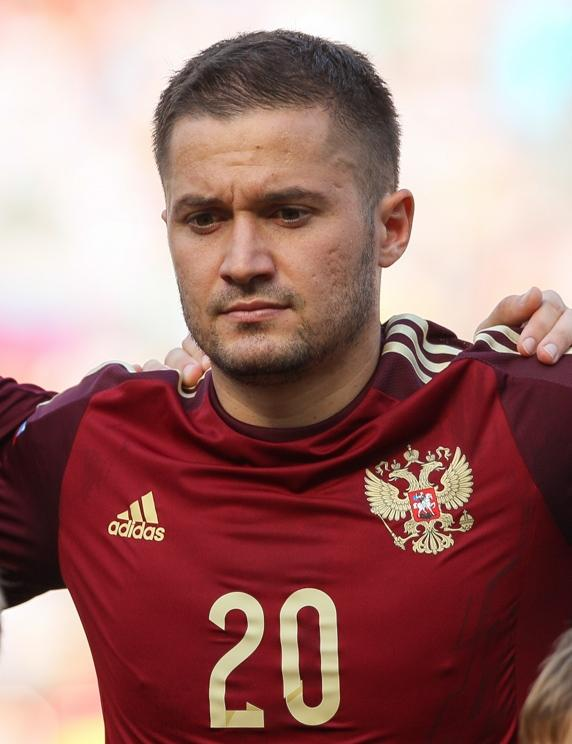
- Fayzulin playing for Russia in 2014

Personal information
- Full name: Viktor Igorevich Fayzulin
- Date of birth: 22 April 1986 (age 40)
- Place of birth: Nakhodka, Soviet Union
- Height: 1.76 m (5 ft 9 1/2 in)
- Position: Winger

Senior career*
Years	Team	Apps	(Gls)
2004	Okean Nakhodka	9	(0)
2004–2006	SKA-Energia Khabarovsk	51	(8)
2007	Spartak Nalchik	28	(3)
2007–2018	Zenit Saint Petersburg	157	(21)

International career
2007–2008	Russia U-21	11	(3)
2011	Russia-2	2	(0)
2012–2014	Russia	20	(4)
- * Club domestic league appearances and goals

Viktor Igorevich Fayzulin (Russian: Виктор Игоревич Файзулин; born 22 April 1986) is a Russian former footballer who played as a midfielder.

== Career ==
=== Club ===
A graduate of CYSS based in his hometown Nakhodka, he started his professional career with Okean Nakhodka. Later, he played for SKA-Energiya and Spartak Nalchik. In December 2007, he signed a contract with Zenit until December 2010. In February 2012 he extended his contract till 2016. In April 2018, it was reported that Fayzulin was nearing a comeback after being sidelined with a knee injury since September 2015. After his contract with Zenit Saint Petersburg expired at the end of the 2017–18 season, he announced his retirement after missing 2.5 years due to injury.

=== International ===
He made his national team debut on 15 August 2012 in a friendly against Ivory Coast. He scored his first goal for the national team in his next game, a 2014 FIFA World Cup qualifier against Northern Ireland on 7 September 2012. He scored once again in his next game, another World Cup qualifier against Israel on 11 September 2012.

== Career statistics ==
=== Club ===
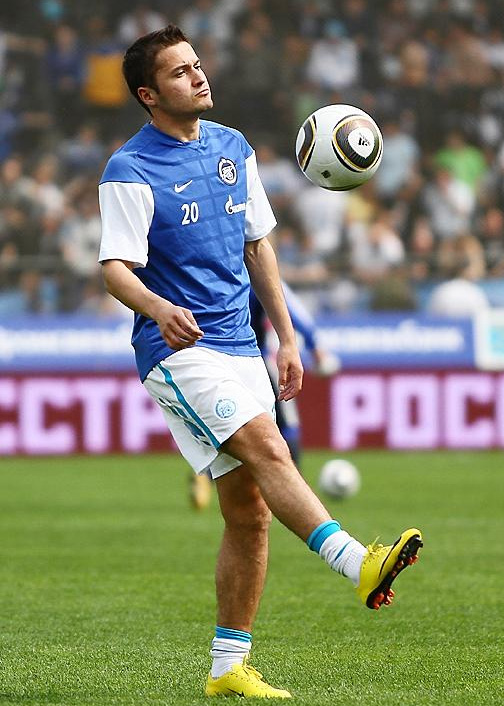
Fayzulin warming up before a 0–1 away win against Saturn on 2 May 2010

Club	Season	League			Cup		Continental		Other		Total	
Club	Season	Division	Apps	Goals	Apps	Goals	Apps	Goals	Apps	Goals	Apps	Goals
Okean Nakhodka	2004	Russian Second League	9	0	2	0	–		–		11	0
SKA-Energia Khabarovsk	2004	Russian First League	17	6	2	0	–		–		19	6
SKA-Energia Khabarovsk	2005	Russian First League	14	1	1	0	–		–		15	1
SKA-Energia Khabarovsk	2006	Russian First League	20	1	1	0	–		–		21	1
SKA-Energia Khabarovsk	Total		51	8	4	0	0	0	0	0	55	8
Spartak Nalchik	2007	Russian Premier League	28	3	0	0	–		–		28	3
Zenit Saint Petersburg	2008	Russian Premier League	24	6	1	0	11 (Note: Two appearances in UEFA Champions League, nine appearances, one goal in UEFA Cup)	1	1 (Note: Appearances in the Russian Super Cup)	0	37	7
Zenit Saint Petersburg	2009	Russian Premier League	16	0	2	0	4 (Note: Appearances in UEFA Cup)	1	–		22	1
Zenit Saint Petersburg	2010	Russian Premier League	14	2	3	0	5 (Note: Two appearances in UEFA Champions League, three appearances in UEFA Europa League)	0	–		22	1
Zenit Saint Petersburg	2011–12	Russian Premier League	34	4	2	1	10 (Note: Eight appearances, one goal in UEFA Champions League, two appearances in UEFA Europa League)	0	0	0	46	5
Zenit Saint Petersburg	2012–13	Russian Premier League	24	6	4	0	8 (Note: Four appearances, one goal in UEFA Champions League, four appearances in UEFA Europa League)	1	1	0	37	7
Zenit Saint Petersburg	2013–14	Russian Premier League	26	3	0	0	9 (Note: Appearances in UEFA Champions League)	0	1	0	36	3
Zenit Saint Petersburg	2014–15	Russian Premier League	14	0	1	0	8	0	–		23	0
Zenit Saint Petersburg	2015–16	Russian Premier League	5	0	0	0	1	0	0	0	6	0
Zenit Saint Petersburg	Total		157	21	13	1	56	3	3	0	229	24
Career total			245	32	19	1	56	3	3	0	323	35

=== International goals ===
Scores and goals list Russia's goal tally first.

No.	Date	Venue	Opponent	Score	Result	Competition
1.	7 September 2012	Lokomotiv Stadium, Moscow	Northern Ireland	1–0	2–0	2014 World Cup qualifier
2.	11 September 2012	Ramat Gan Stadium, Ramat Gan	Israel	4–0	4–0	2014 World Cup qualifier
3.	25 March 2013	Stamford Bridge, London	Brazil	1–0	1–1	Friendly
4.	11 October 2013	Stade Josy Barthel, Luxembourg	Luxembourg	2–0	4–0	2014 World Cup qualifier

== Career honours ==
Zenit St. Petersburg

- UEFA Cup: 2008
- Russian Premier League: 2010, 2011–12, 2014–15
- Russian Cup: 2010
