= Ivanenko =

Ivanenko (Ukrainian: Iваненко; Belarusian: Іваненка; Russian: Иваненко) is a Ukrainian surname. Notable people with the surname include:

- Dmitri Ivanenko (1904–1994), Soviet physicist
- Oksana Ivanenko (1906–1997), Ukrainian children's writer and translator
- Viktor Ivanenko (born 1961), Ukrainian sport shooter
- Volodymyr Ivanenko (television executive) (1954–2006), Ukrainian television producer
- Sergey Ivanenko (1959–2024), Russian economist and politician
- Vyacheslav Ivanenko (born 1961), Soviet race walker
- Yevgeniy Ivanenko (born 1995), Belarusian footballer
