= 2008 UEFA Cup final riots =

Football disorder in Manchester, England

Coordinates: 53°28′51″N 2°14′12″W

2008 UEFA Cup Final riots
- Part of the history of Manchester and the 2007–08 UEFA Cup
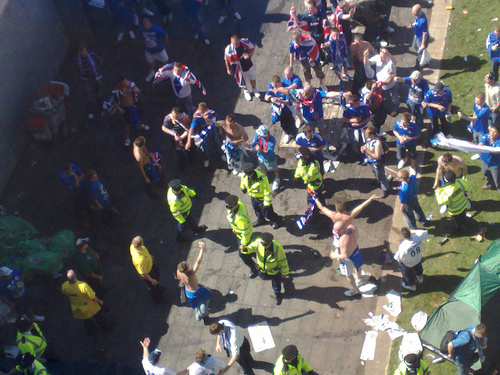
- Officers of the Greater Manchester Police keep Rangers and Zenit Saint Petersburg fans apart
- Date: 14 May 2008
- Location: Manchester City Centre, England
- Result: 39 policemen injured, one police-dog injured and 39 arrests

Parties
| Zenit Saint Petersburg hooligans | Rangers hooligans | Greater Manchester Police |

Riots took place in Manchester, England, on the day of the 2008 UEFA Cup final between FC Zenit Saint Petersburg and Rangers FC. Serious disorder was allegedly sparked by the failure of a big screen erected in Piccadilly Gardens to transmit the match to thousands of Rangers fans who had travelled to the city without tickets. In addition to property damage, fifteen policemen were injured and ambulance crews attended 52 cases of assault. A Manchester City Council inquiry into the events estimated that over 200,000 Rangers fans visited Manchester for the match, with 39 fans arrested for a range of offences across the city, while 38 complaints were received about the conduct of Greater Manchester Police officers.

== Early scuffles ==
One early incident occurred when fighting between rival fans broke out in a pub, resulting in its closure. The evening before the match, someone had set off fire alarms in the city, a criminal offence. An official report found that missile-throwing and fighting by Rangers fans occurred as long as eight hours before the match began. Around late afternoon the Piccadilly fans zone's gates were forced. Large numbers of fans were jumping upon the roofs of sales units and urinating. The sales units were "overrun" and frightened staff had to flee. Police were called but were powerless in the face of the large number of supporters.

== Screen failure ==
Just as the match kicked-off, serious civil disorder began when a large screen, which was erected to broadcast the game at the Rangers fanzone in Piccadilly Gardens, blacked out. Chris Burrows, chair of the Manchester Police Federation, claimed the screen was deliberately switched off. The technicians who were brought in to try to rectify the fault failed to gain access to the enclosed facility and withdrew. The police tried to prevent supporters from leaving the enclosed square to relocate to another screen facility. Rangers fans then tore down the barriers, as riot police arrived en masse. Several hundred people became directly involved in disorder and "considerable violence" was directed at the police who tried to enclose the supporters. In total, thirty-nine police officers were injured, including one incident in which a few fans were isolated and attacked by riot officers. PC Paul Ritchie received a High Commendation for saving a police officer knocked to the ground by a bottle thrown by a rioter. A police dog was injured when it stood on some broken glass.

BBC News reported that a small groups of Rangers supporters had clashed with police in the city centre where a bank was attacked and damage caused to a bus stop and a sports car. Greater Manchester Police reported that "a minority of thugs" among the 200,000 visiting Rangers fans were involved in the violence.

== Reaction ==
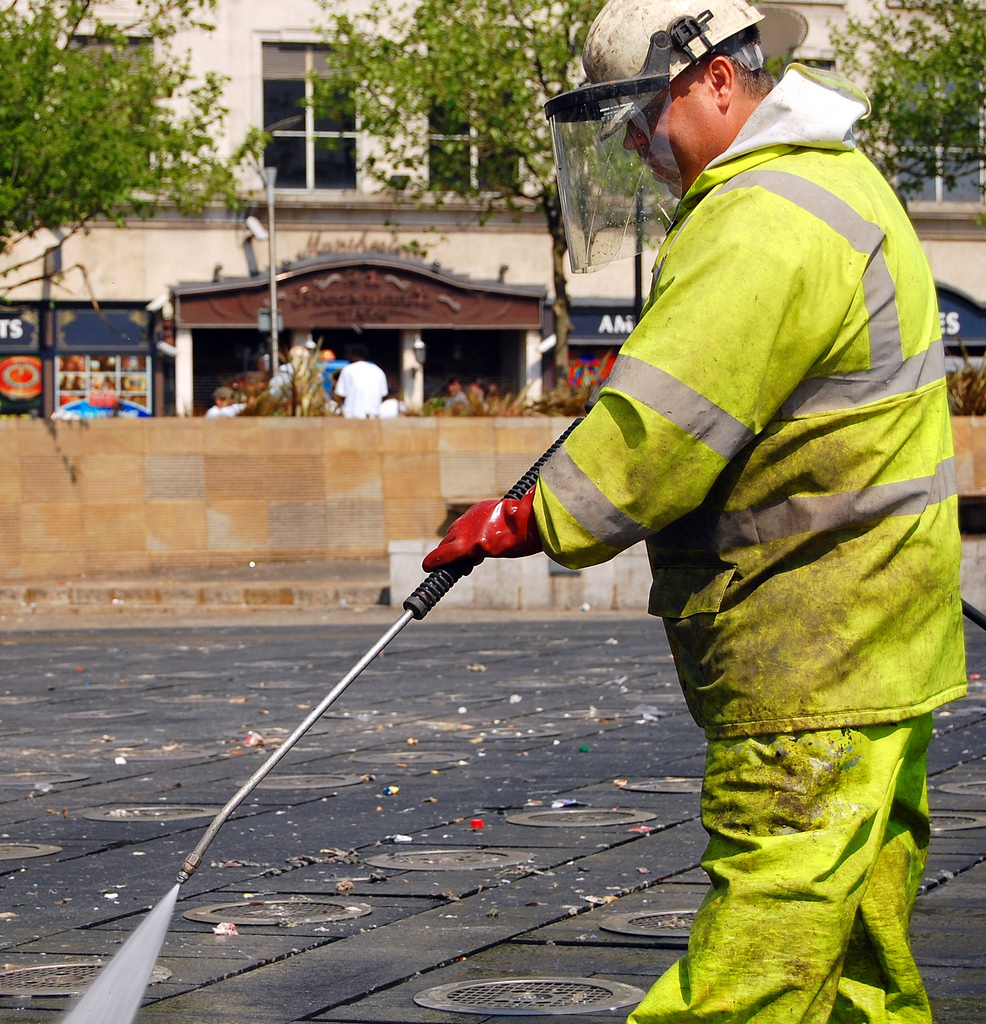
Cleanup in Piccadilly Gardens, the day after the disturbance.

BBC News interrupted normal programming to broadcast the riots live on television, with ITN's flagship News at Ten programme giving extensive coverage to the riots. Judge Andrew Blake of Manchester Crown Court, when later sentencing twelve people in connection to the disorder, described the riots as "the worst night of violence and destruction suffered by Manchester city centre since the Blitz".

Rangers' chief executive Martin Bain described the scenes as "dreadful" but claimed that the violent scenes "were caused by supporters that don't normally attach themselves to our support". He also stated that the club was "in general, absolutely delighted with the behaviour of the hundreds of thousands of our supporters." The following day the Prime Minister Gordon Brown condemned the rioting as "a disgrace". Scottish Conservative leader, Annabel Goldie, said she was "absolutely appalled" by the footage, condemning the behaviour as "horrific and inexcusable". Steven Purcell, leader of Glasgow City Council, offered an apology in a Manchester newspaper for 200 hardcore thugs.

PC Mick Regan, attacked by a gang of twenty men whilst lying on the ground, described the violence. "It was unbelievable when we got there, it was already in motion. It was frightening, on a different scale from any other match I have worked in my 23-year career. It seemed the vast majority were drunk and they just wanted to cause trouble. A lot of the fans were OK and just asking for directions but there was a large hard core... I know they will say it's a minority but a few thousand is a big minority."

A UEFA spokesman indicated that Rangers were unlikely to face sanctions because the violence did not occur at the City of Manchester Stadium where the match was held.

Many Rangers fans criticised the tactics employed by Greater Manchester Police. In particular, the deputy leader of the Scottish Conservatives' Murdo Fraser suggested the problem might have been caused by heavy-handed policing. He later retracted this after police released footage showing the scale of the problems.

There were 63 complaints about police conduct, mainly on the grounds of excessive force. They included one from a 60-year-old man who spent four weeks in hospital after suffering a broken hip and perforated bowel. One fan, James Clark, was charged with rioting, but later cleared of all charges by a court in Manchester. He told STV, "I have been through utter hell because of the police. They picked me out of crowd of fans at random, beat me black and blue with their batons and set their dogs on me. Yet they charged me with being violent. You couldn't make it up." The police, however, defended their actions.

There was also criticism from supporters regarding the organisation of the event. In response the Leader of Manchester City Council, Sir Richard Leese, said "If we are going to put a finger of blame anywhere it has to be with those fans having to take responsibility for their own behaviour."

Upon the advice of Greater Manchester Police following the unrest, Manchester United cancelled plans for a public parade to celebrate their 2007–08 Premier League and UEFA Champions League Double.

== Arrests and convictions ==
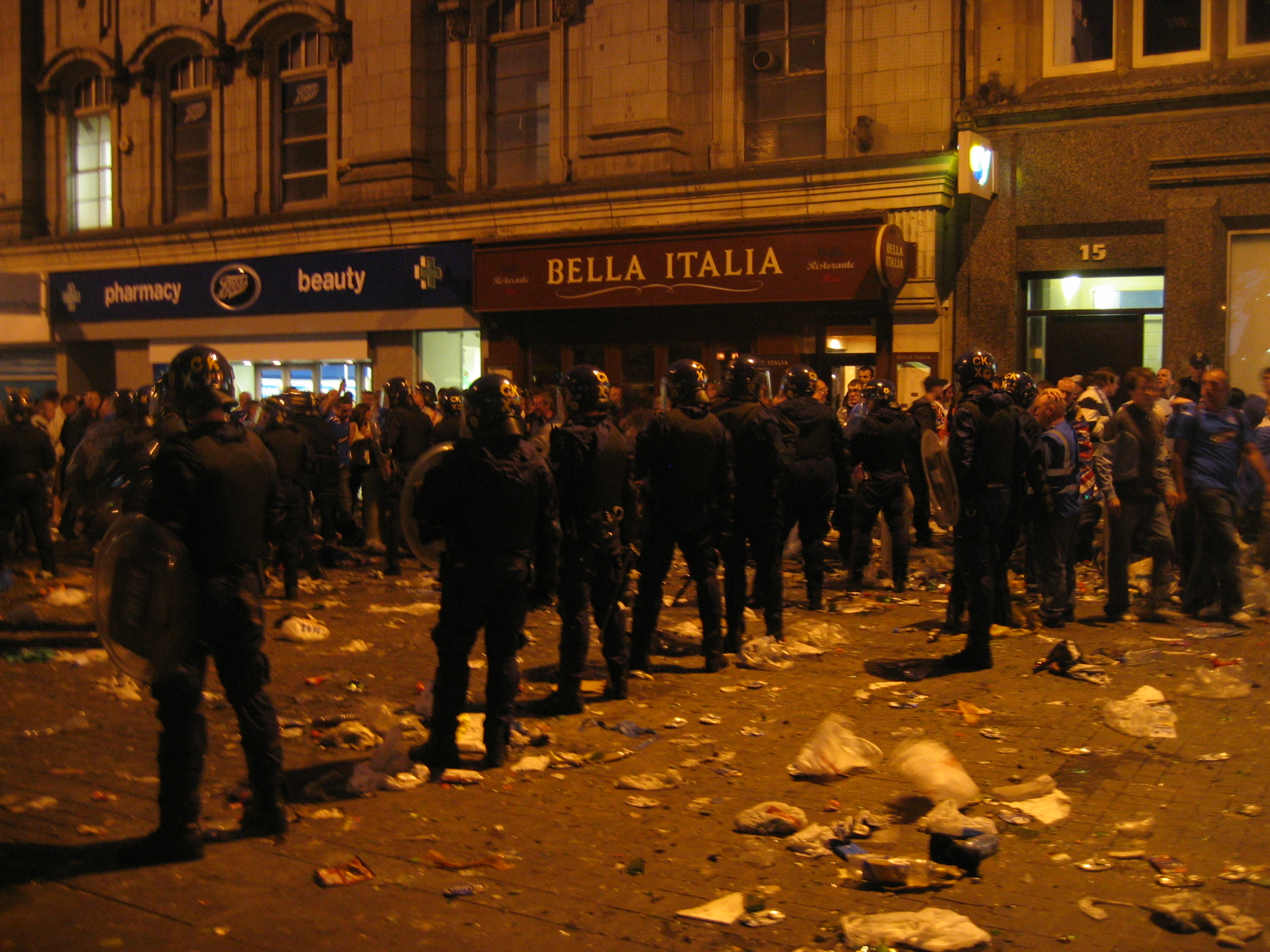
Police lined up in riot gear in Piccadilly Gardens

Manchester City Council announced that 39 fans were arrested for various offences. These included Section 18 wounding at the stadium in relation to the Russian man who was allegedly stabbed, public order offences, touting, affray, possession of an offensive weapon, Section 47 assault, common assault, possession of Class A drugs, theft, possession of forged tickets, and a Zenit fan for pitch incursion. The force's Assistant Chief Constable referred to the behaviour of the fans who were involved in trouble as "unnecessary and unacceptable".

An appeal was issued on Crimewatch in January 2009, and published in Rangers' match programme, attempting to trace 49 men in connection with the riots.

In August 2009, thirteen suspected football hooligans appeared in Manchester magistrates court charged with violent disorder following the final. In particular, Scott McSeveny was charged with knocking PC John Goodwin unconscious; another fan, Mark Stoddart, was alleged to have assaulted PC Mick Regan. Twelve people were convicted of rioting and eleven given prison sentences varying from six months to three and a half years in September 2010.

An arrested rioter was found to be a serving Essex police officer who was off duty at the time of the incident. He was charged with violent disorder and was released on bail.

== Return to Manchester ==
Plans by Manchester United to invite Rangers to be the opponents for Gary Neville's testimonial match were reportedly abandoned in April 2010 due to objections from police and the local council over fears of trouble due to remaining bad feeling over the damage caused to Manchester city centre by the riots.

Rangers were drawn alongside Manchester United in the same group for the 2010–11 UEFA Champions League group stage, with the opening game in Manchester on 14 September 2010, with a reverse fixture in Glasgow on 24 November. The draw raised security concerns, in particular regarding the potential for possible reprisals, and the prospect of a large number of ticketless fans arriving in Manchester. United's chief executive David Gill played down the potential for trouble, emphasising instead the connection the two clubs had in both the current club managers in Alex Ferguson of United and Walter Smith of Rangers. The Rangers chief executive Martin Bain also dismissed concerns, highlighting the club's good relations, and prior Champions League meeting in 2003.

Before kick-off, away supporters were held at Wigan Athletic's DW Stadium, to prevent congregation within Manchester city centre. The match passed with 10 arrests for minor offences, involving five Rangers supporters and five Manchester United fans. The behaviour of Rangers fans was praised by Greater Manchester Police. Wigan Athletic's safety officer also commended supporters' behaviour, commenting "Rangers fans are welcome here any time in the future, because we had a superb reaction from those who travelled".

== See also ==
- 2000 UEFA Cup Final riots
- Football hooliganism
- Rangers F.C. in European football
- FC Zenit Saint Petersburg in European football
