= Anatoliy Tymoshchuk =

Ukrainian footballer and coach (born 1979)

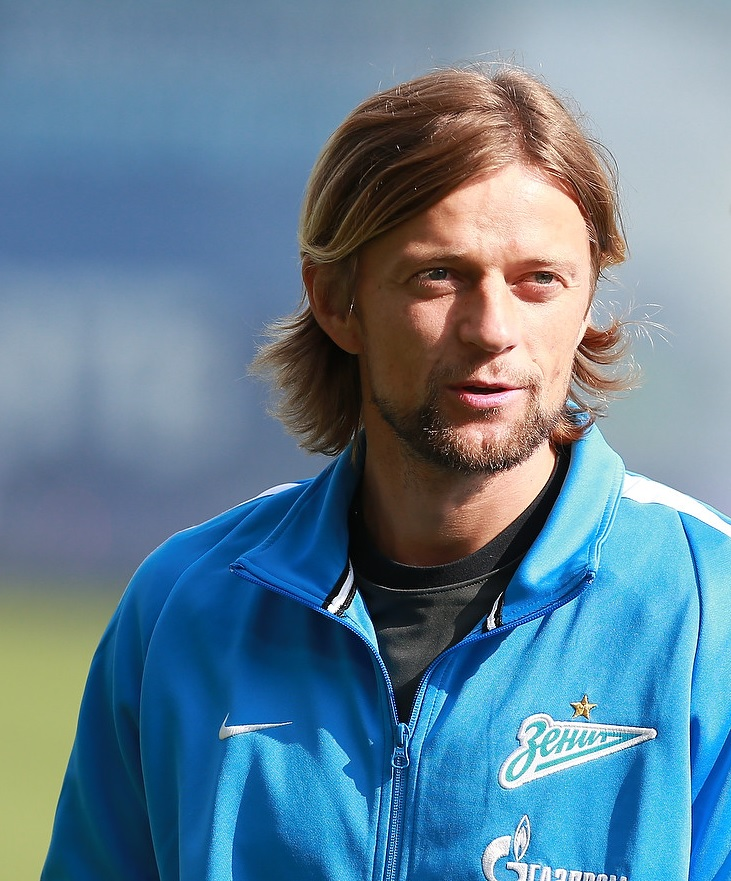
- Tymoshchuk coaching Zenit in 2017

Personal information
- Full name: Anatoliy Oleksandrovych Tymoshchuk
- Date of birth: 30 March 1979 (age 47)
- Place of birth: Lutsk, Ukrainian SSR, Soviet Union
- Height: 1.81 m (5 ft 11 in)
- Position: Defensive midfielder

Team information
- Current team: Zenit Saint Petersburg (assistant)

Youth career
- 1994–1995: Volyn Lutsk

Senior career*
Years	Team	Apps	(Gls)
1995–1997	Volyn Lutsk	62	(8)
1998–2001	Shakhtar-2 Donetsk	25	(9)
1998–2007	Shakhtar Donetsk	227	(32)
2007–2009	Zenit Saint Petersburg	67	(10)
2009–2013	Bayern Munich	86	(4)
2013–2015	Zenit Saint Petersburg	32	(0)
2015–2016	Kairat	34	(1)
Total		533	(64)

International career
2000–2016	Ukraine	144	(4)

Managerial career
- 2017–: Zenit Saint Petersburg (assistant)
- * Club domestic league appearances and goals

Anatoliy Oleksandrovych Tymoshchuk (Ukrainian: Анатолій Олександрович Тимощук [ɐnɐˈtɔl⁽ʲ⁾ij olekˈsɑndrowɪdʒ‿tɪmoˈʃtʃuk], Russian: Анато́лий Алекса́ндрович Тимощу́к; born 30 March 1979) is a Ukrainian football coach and former midfielder. Since 2017, he has served as an assistant coach of the Russian Premier League club Zenit Saint Petersburg. Tymoshchuk is regarded as one of the greatest players in the history of Shakhtar Donetsk and Zenit Saint Petersburg, and is also a former captain of the Ukraine national team.

Tymoshchuk began his professional career with his local Volyn Lutsk. He moved to play for Ukrainian giants Shakhtar Donetsk, which he captained and won the Ukrainian Premier League, Ukrainian Cup and Ukrainian Super Cup titles with. In 2008, Tymoshchuk won the UEFA Cup and the UEFA Super Cup as captain of Zenit Saint Petersburg. He also won a Russian Premier League and Russian Super Cup title. After joining German club Bayern Munich, Tymoshchuk won the Bundesliga, DFB-Pokal and the DFB-Supercup titles. With Bayern, he also won the UEFA Champions League in 2013 and finished as runners-up in 2010 and 2012.

A former captain of the Ukraine national team, Tymoshchuk is the nation's all-time most capped player with 144 caps. He took part in Ukraine's first-ever FIFA World Cup in 2006 and their first European Championship in 2012. He won the Ukrainian Footballer of the Year on three occasions.

In 2022, the Ukrainian Association of Football stripped Tymoshchuk of his (Ukrainian) coaching license and titles because he did not speak out against Russia's ongoing invasion of Ukraine and stayed on as assistant coach at Zenit Saint Petersburg. On 6 January 2023, he was formally sanctioned by Ukraine among other Russian and pro-Russian celebrities, having his assets frozen and state awards revoked.

== Club career ==
=== Volyn Lutsk ===
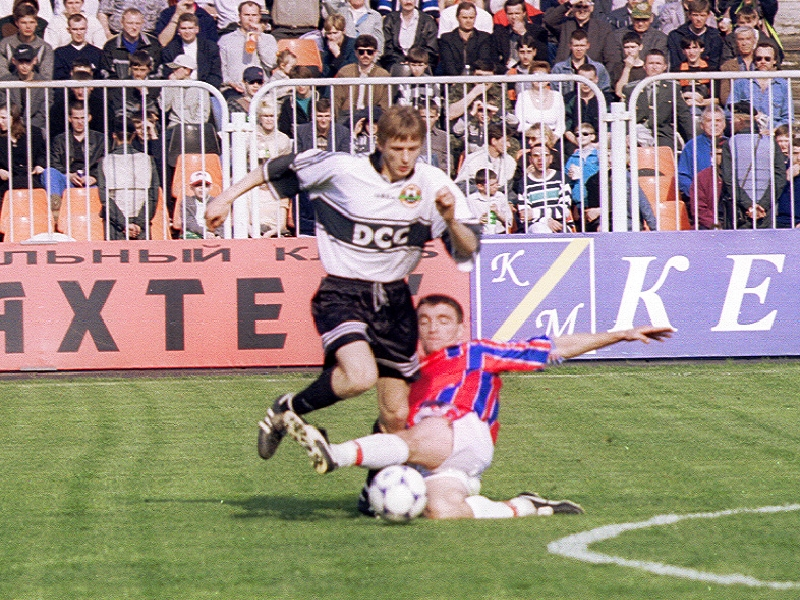
Tymoshchuk playing for Shakhtar Donetsk.

Tymoshchuk started his career playing for his hometown club Volyn Lutsk, having risen through the ranks at the team. Following two successful seasons, the player began to attract attention from bigger clubs.

=== Shakhtar Donetsk ===
In 1997, at age 18, Tymoshchuk's contract was purchased from Volyn by Shakhtar Donetsk. At Shakhtar, he was a key member of the team which won three Ukrainian Premier League titles, three Ukrainian Cups and a Ukrainian Super Cup. His time with Shakhtar is credited with establishing him as a great midfielder in Europe.

In 2006, having captained Shakhtar for a number of years, Tymoshchuk became linked with a string of European clubs, including Juventus, Feyenoord, Celtic and Roma.

=== Zenit Saint Petersburg ===
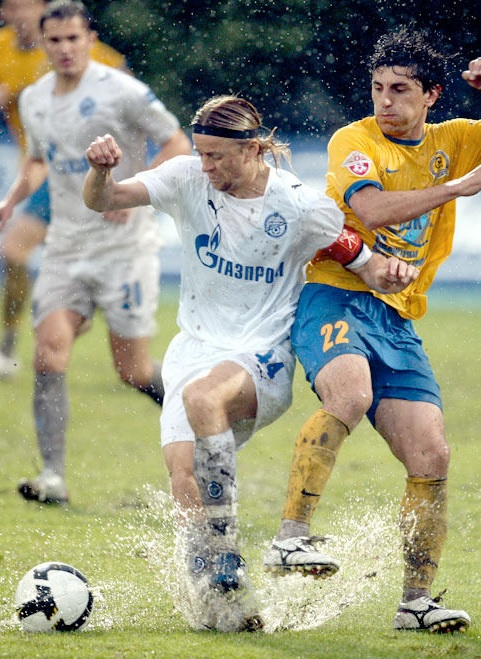
Tymoshchuk playing for Zenit against Luch-Energiya in 2008.

On 27 February 2007, Tymoshchuk transferred to Zenit Saint Petersburg for a reported €15 million fee. He was soon named as the new captain of the team. Zenit manager Dick Advocaat was very impressed with him, saying, "About Tymoshchuk I can say only good things, and not only the player but also the person. Tymoshchuk – is a professional from head to toes. I never had complaints to him about discipline. While Tymoshchuk and I are at the club, he will be the captain of Zenit."

His first season at the club ended in success, with Zenit winning the Russian Premier League title for the first time in club history and the club's first league title since its 1984 Soviet Top League triumph. At the end of the season, Tymoshchuk was included in the annual list of the best 33 players of the Premier League, and was also voted as league player of the year by popular sports magazine Sport-Express.

After Zenit won the championship, astronaut Yuri Malenchenko—known as a fan of the team—waved Zenit shirt with Tymoshchuk's name on it while in space. In so doing, Zenit became the first team to have its uniform shown in space.

During the 2007–08 European season, Tymoshchuk captained Zenit to the UEFA Cup title, in which they defeated Scottish Premier League club Rangers 2–0 in the final. The club then went on to claim the 2008 UEFA Super Cup in a 2–1 victory over Manchester United.

=== Bayern Munich ===
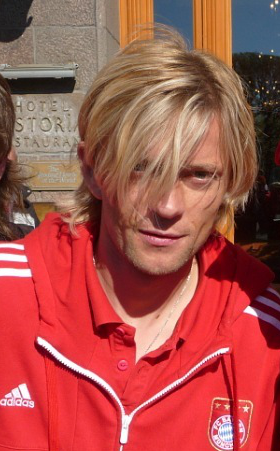
Tymoshchuk in Bayern Munich colours, 2011

In February 2009, Bayern Munich general manager Uli Hoeneß announced Tymoshchuk had agreed to join Bayern. Initially, Zenit announced no agreement had yet been reached between the two clubs. However, on 18 February, Bayern announced Tymoshchuk would join the club in July 2009 in order to allow Tymoshchuk to play for Zenit until the summer. He played his last match with Zenit on 14 June 2009.

Tymoshchuk officially joined Bayern on 1 July 2009 with a contract set to expire 30 June 2012. The transfer fee was undisclosed, but German media reports estimated the deal at €14 million.

Tymoshchuk played his first match for Bayern against Milan in the 2009 Audi Cup, coming on as a second-half substitute. He also started in the final against Manchester United, where he was substituted off in the 77th minute; Bayern won the match 7–6 on penalties. He scored his first goal for Bayern against Juventus in the 2009–10 UEFA Champions League. On 8 May 2010, Tymoshchuk won his first trophy with Bayern, the 2009–10 Bundesliga, followed one week later by the 2009–10 DFB-Pokal title. In total, Tymoshchuk made 21 Bundesliga appearances in the 2009–10 season, ten as a substitute, but failed to start a match in the whole of the second half of the season.

In late July 2010, Bayern manager Louis van Gaal described Tymoshchuk's prospects as "not very bright", adding, "If a player doesn't play or doesn't have bright prospects then I would leave if I were them." Nevertheless, from October 2010 until March 2011, Tymoshchuk started all of Bayern's matches.

In 2011, new Bayern manager Jupp Heynckes said Tymoshchuk would play more under him. Tymoshchuk was given a chance to start in matches at the time the team was plagued with injuries, filling in at central defence. He started in central defence alongside Jérôme Boateng in the Champions League final in Munich, which Bayern lost to Chelsea on penalties. Before the final, Heynckes said, "Tymoshchuk is a great team player. He's really important for us, and in situation, when three players are disqualified, his experience and ability to play in different positions is really useful for us." Because Tymoshchuk played a bigger role under Heynckes than under Van Gaal, he became an important part of the team. Goalkeeper Manuel Neuer said of Tymoshchuk, "For me the main job – not to let goals in. As a result, I love partners who have the same job. Anatoliy – is quite an aggressive footballer, but it's a smart aggression. He knows perfectly, when to choose the right position, to stop the attack of the opponent, and when to use such a move, like taking the ball harshly. No doubt, Tymoshchuk is doing a great job at Bayern!"

=== Return to Zenit Saint Petersburg ===
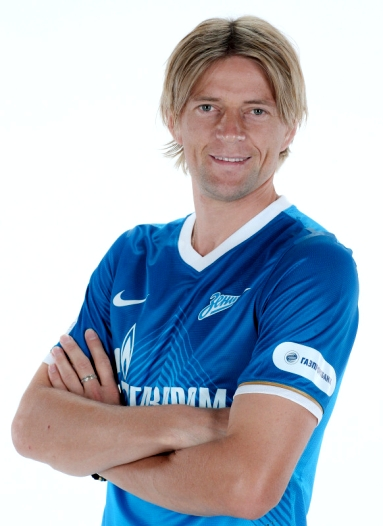
Tymoshchuk during his second spell at Zenit, 2013

After winning the 2012–13 Champions League with Bayern, Tymoshchuk returned to Zenit, despite receiving offers from different clubs around Europe. Russian media claim Tymoshchuk was signed by Zenit not only because of his skills as player, but for his ability to integrate the Russians and the foreigners in the team and stop the rumoured conflicts among groups in the squad. Tymoshchuk himself said the return to Zenit was the last transfer in his career, indicating he would finish his playing career with the club.

In 2014, Zenit lost 4–2 to Borussia Dortmund, with Dortmund scoring twice in the first five minutes of the match. Tymoshchuk has said there was a chance for his team to score when the scoreline was 3–2, but they never did.

=== Kairat ===
On 6 July 2015, Tymoshchuk signed an 18-month contract with Kazakhstan Premier League side Kairat. He captained the team in his league debut. He helped the team to its 2015 Kazakhstan Cup title. Tymoshchuk left Kairat upon the completion of his contract in November 2016. Without officially announcing his retirement, he began studying for his PRO coaching license.

== International career ==
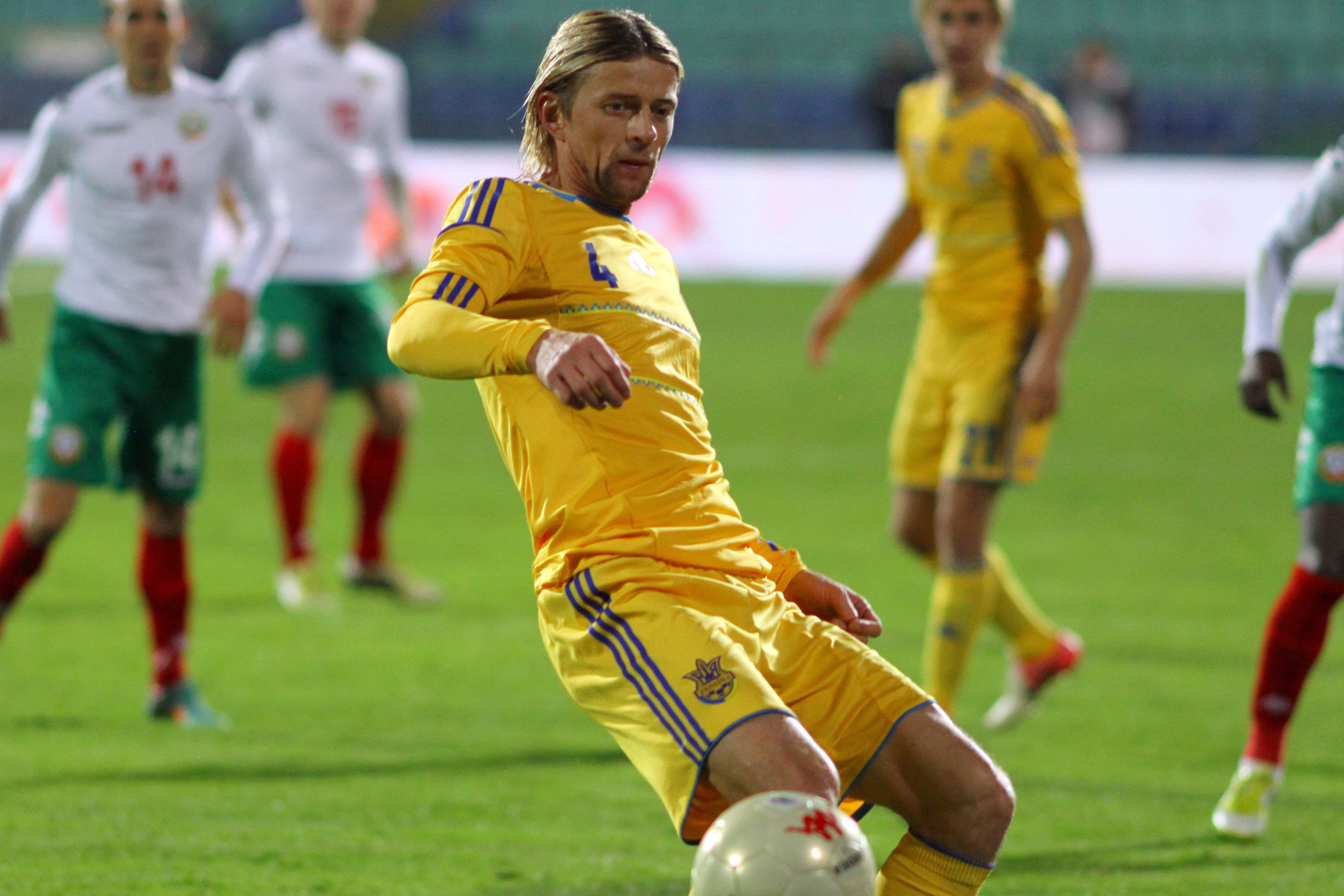
Tymoshchuk playing for Ukraine against Bulgaria in 2012

Since his debut in 2000, Tymoshchuk became a key member of the Ukraine national team. He gained recognition for his performance during the 2006 FIFA World Cup in which Ukraine reached the quarter-finals, being named man of the match in Ukraine's victory over Tunisia. Tymoshchuk has been described as one of the catalysts for Ukraine's first World Cup appearance. In 2009, he won Cyprus International Football Tournaments.

On 11 October 2010, in a friendly match against Brazil, Tymoshchuk became the second Ukraine player to earn 100 caps, after Andriy Shevchenko, who reached the milestone in a friendly against Canada two days prior.

On 20 December 2011, Tymoshchuk was named the best footballer in the history of Ukraine; he finished first in a nationwide poll to determine the key individuals in the Ukrainian game since the nation's independence in 1991. During his playing career, he was "a deep-lying midfielder who is comfortable on the ball and capable of ferocious long-range shooting". After Shevchenko's retirement in 2012, Tymoshchuk inherited the captaincy of the team.

He is the most capped Ukrainian player with 144 appearances as of 29 June 2016. In August 2016, Tymoshchuk officially retired from international football.

== Personal life ==
Tymoshchuk was married to Nadiya Tymoshchuk (née Navrotska).

The couple met in his hometown Lutsk while living in the same neighbourhood, when they were 15 and 16. Their twins were born three months prematurely in April 2010. In July, it was determined the children were growing well and would be released from hospital. In summer 2016, Nadiya, who lives in Munich with their children, announced she was filing for divorce. Since their divorce, Tymoshchuk's children have remained in Germany with his ex-wife. In June 2008, Tymoshchuk was awarded the title of "Honorary citizen of Lutsk". The honour was rescinded on his 43rd birthday in 2022. Tymoshchuk's favorite player is Lothar Matthäus. He stated that the historical team in which he most wanted to play was the Germany national team in 1990, alongside Matthäus. He is also a fan of the Ukrainian band Okean Elzy and Russian painter Mikhail Vrubel. He is an avid collector of wines, t-shirts and icons. Tymoshchuk considers four his lucky number; he often wore 4 or 44 as his shirt number at both international and club level. Aside from his native Ukrainian, he speaks Polish and Russian as well as basic Croatian and German. Tymoshchuk and his father have since 2000 organized tournaments, the International Anatoliy Tymoshchuk Junior Cup, for children from Ukraine and neighbour states in Lutsk. The winners get cups and money awards. The mission of the tournament was to encourage children to continue their football training by giving them a chance to participate in a real competition.

== Conduct after the Russian invasion of Ukraine ==
At the time of the Russian invasion of Ukraine, Tymoshchuk was an assistant coach at Russian club Zenit St Petersburg. Unlike his former national teammate Andriy Voronin, also working in Russia at the time, he did not immediately resign, leave Russia's territory, or speak out against the war. As the result of him keeping silence on the topic of war, his behaviour has drawn controversy and condemnation in his home country where he was widely known and admired as the country's most capped player.

=== Zenit controversy ===
On 11 March 2022, the Ukrainian Association of Football (UAF) stripped Tymoshchuk of his (Ukrainian) coaching licence and titles because of his role at Zenit St Petersburg and for not speaking against Russia's ongoing invasion of Ukraine. The UAF stated that his "conscious choice" to continue at Zenit "damages the image of Ukrainian football". Reports also surfaced suggesting he might be a Russian spy. A Polish sport commentator described his case as that of "a collaborator, erased from Ukrainian sport history". Others have speculated that Tymoshchuk is being used by the Russian state and unable to speak freely for fear of retribution.

In response to the UAF's action, Tymoshchuk returned his regalia to Ukraine and filed a lawsuit with the Court of Arbitration for Sport.

In 2023, Tymoshchuk was officially sanctioned for "treason" and included on a sanctions list for a period of ten years, blocking all his assets and preventing him from entering the country. Later that year, allegations arose that Tymoshchuk had tried to acquire Romanian citizenship despite claims that his grandmother's birth in the country was inaccurate.

In January 2024, American football coach Dennis Lukens said he had been in contact with Tymoshchuk after the invasion, and reportedly tried to help Tymoshchuk leave the country. Lukens said that Tymoshchuk told him he loved Ukraine and asked for his help to leave Russia, but was stuck and unable to leave. Lukens's speculation that Tymoshchuk had already left the country by other means caused wide speculation in Ukraine, however the comments were quickly debunked after Tymoshchuk was prominently pictured at an ice hockey match in St. Petersburg days later.

=== Utkin controversy ===
When criticising Tymoshchuk, Russian sports journalist Vasily Utkin said that "[Tymoshchuk] cares only and exclusively about money," and claimed that whilst a player for Zenit, he asked the club for large numbers of tickets with the purpose of reselling them. However, that story was quickly disproved by others. Former Zenit player Vladislav Radimov called it "complete nonsense" and provided a story how Tymoshchuk at one point gave him two tickets to a game, but refused to take money from him for those tickets. Russian sports journalist Alexey Andronov also spoke out in defence of Tymoshchuk, and said how at one point Tymoshchuk gave him and another journalist tickets to a game, but did not ask for money in return. He also pointed out how players requesting tickets from their club for friends is a normal practice in Russia, but unheard of in other European leagues.

=== Kit auction ===
In September 2024, Tymoshchuk donated a signed Zenit St Petersburg football jersey in support of the Russian military, with proceeds going to support action in sent to the Kursk Region. The signed shirt sold for 700,000 rubles. The action was widely condemned in Ukraine, with former teammate Oleksandr Aliyev calling the actions an "abomination".

== Career statistics ==
=== Club ===
As of match played 19 November 2016

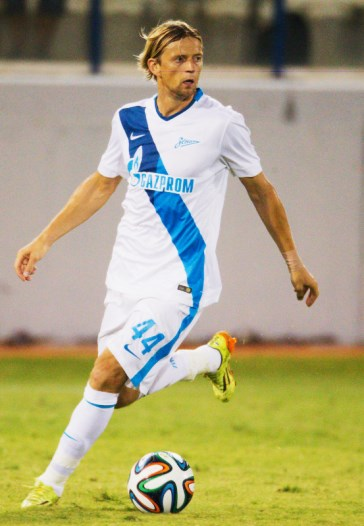
Tymoshchuk playing against AEL Limassol in the UEFA Champions League during his second spell with Zenit

Appearances and goals by club, season and competition
Club	Season	League			Cup		Europe		Super Cup		Total	
Club	Season	Division	Apps	Goals	Apps	Goals	Apps	Goals	Apps	Goals	Apps	Goals
Volyn Lutsk	1995–96	Ukrainian First League	10	1	1	0	—		—		11	1
Volyn Lutsk	1996–97	Ukrainian First League	38	6	2	0	—		—		40	6
Volyn Lutsk	1997–98	Ukrainian First League	14	1	2	0	—		—		16	1
Volyn Lutsk	Total		62	8	5	0	—		—		67	8
Shakhtar-2 Donetsk	1997–98	Ukrainian Second League	6	4	—		—		—		6	4
Shakhtar-2 Donetsk	1998–99	Ukrainian First League	14	5	—		—		—		14	5
Shakhtar-2 Donetsk	1999–2000	Ukrainian First League	4	0	—		—		—		4	0
Shakhtar-2 Donetsk	2000–01	Ukrainian First League	1	0	—		—		—		1	0
Shakhtar-2 Donetsk	Total		25	9	0	0	0	0	0	0	25	9
Shakhtar Donetsk	1997–98	Ukrainian Premier League	9	3	—		—		—		9	3
Shakhtar Donetsk	1998–99	Ukrainian Premier League	18	2	3	0	2	0	—		23	2
Shakhtar Donetsk	1999–2000	Ukrainian Premier League	23	0	3	0	2	0	—		28	0
Shakhtar Donetsk	2000–01	Ukrainian Premier League	25	4	5	1	11	0	—		41	5
Shakhtar Donetsk	2001–02	Ukrainian Premier League	26	3	7	1	6	1	—		39	5
Shakhtar Donetsk	2002–03	Ukrainian Premier League	30	4	6	1	4	0	—		40	5
Shakhtar Donetsk	2003–04	Ukrainian Premier League	29	6	6	1	6	0	—		41	7
Shakhtar Donetsk	2004–05	Ukrainian Premier League	25	4	5	0	10	0	1	0	41	4
Shakhtar Donetsk	2005–06	Ukrainian Premier League	27	5	2	1	8	0	1	0	38	6
Shakhtar Donetsk	2006–07	Ukrainian Premier League	15	1	2	1	8	0	1	0	26	2
Shakhtar Donetsk	Total		227	32	39	6	57	1	3	0	326	39
Zenit Saint Petersburg	2007	Russian Premier League	29	4	5	5	8	1	—		42	10
Zenit Saint Petersburg	2008	Russian Premier League	27	6	0	0	16	0	1	0	44	6
Zenit Saint Petersburg	2009	Russian Premier League	11	0	0	0	3	2	—		14	2
Zenit Saint Petersburg	Total		67	10	5	5	27	3	1	0	100	18
Bayern Munich	2009–10	Bundesliga	21	0	4	0	7	1	—		32	1
Bayern Munich	2010–11	Bundesliga	26	3	4	0	6	1	1	0	37	4
Bayern Munich	2011–12	Bundesliga	23	0	4	0	12	0	—		39	0
Bayern Munich	2012–13	Bundesliga	16	1	3	0	4	0	1	0	24	1
Bayern Munich	Total		86	4	15	0	29	2	2	0	132	6
Zenit Saint Petersburg	2013–14	Russian Premier League	21	0	1	0	5	0	1	0	28	0
Zenit Saint Petersburg	2014–15	Russian Premier League	11	0	1	0	9	0	—		21	0
Zenit Saint Petersburg	Total		32	0	2	0	14	0	1	0	49	0
Kairat	2015	Kazakhstan Premier League	10	0	1	0	6	0	0	0	17	0
Kairat	2016	Kazakhstan Premier League	24	1	4	0	4	0	1	0	33	1
Kairat	Total		34	1	5	0	10	0	1	0	50	1
Career total			533	64	71	11	137	6	8	0	749	81

=== International ===
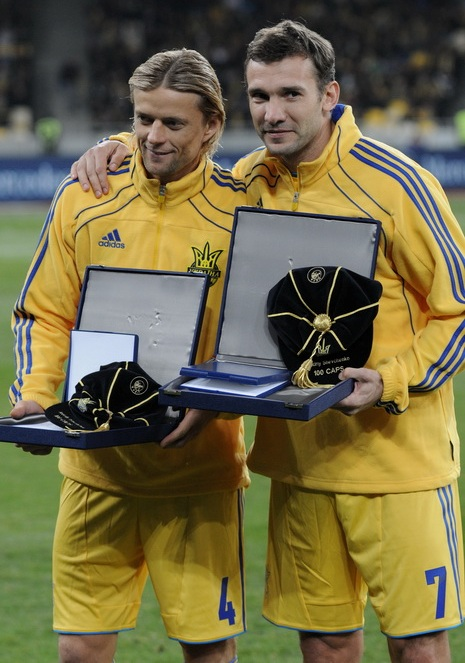
Tymoshchuk and Andriy Shevchenko being honored by UEFA in 2011 for their 100th cap. They are the first and third, respectively, most capped players in the history of Ukraine.

Appearances and goals by national team and year
National team	Year	Apps	Goals
Ukraine	2000	4	0
Ukraine	2001	12	0
Ukraine	2002	8	1
Ukraine	2003	9	0
Ukraine	2004	9	0
Ukraine	2005	10	0
Ukraine	2006	12	0
Ukraine	2007	10	0
Ukraine	2008	7	0
Ukraine	2009	11	0
Ukraine	2010	9	1
Ukraine	2011	12	2
Ukraine	2012	11	0
Ukraine	2013	7	0
Ukraine	2014	6	0
Ukraine	2015	4	0
Ukraine	2016	3	0
Total		144	4

As of match played 21 June 2016. Ukraine score listed first, score column indicates score after each Tymoshchuk goal.

International goals by date, venue, cap, opponent, score, result and competition
No.	Date	Venue	Cap	Opponent	Score	Result	Competition
1	17 April 2002	Lobanovsky Dynamo Stadium, Kyiv, Ukraine	19	Georgia	2–1	2–1	Friendly
2	8 October 2010	Lobanovsky Dynamo Stadium, Kyiv, Ukraine	99	Canada	2–2	2–2	Friendly
3	1 June 2011	Lobanovsky Dynamo Stadium, Kyiv, Ukraine	105	Uzbekistan	1–0	2–0	Friendly
4	6 June 2011	Donbas Arena, Donetsk, Ukraine	106	France	1–0	1–4	Friendly

== Honours ==
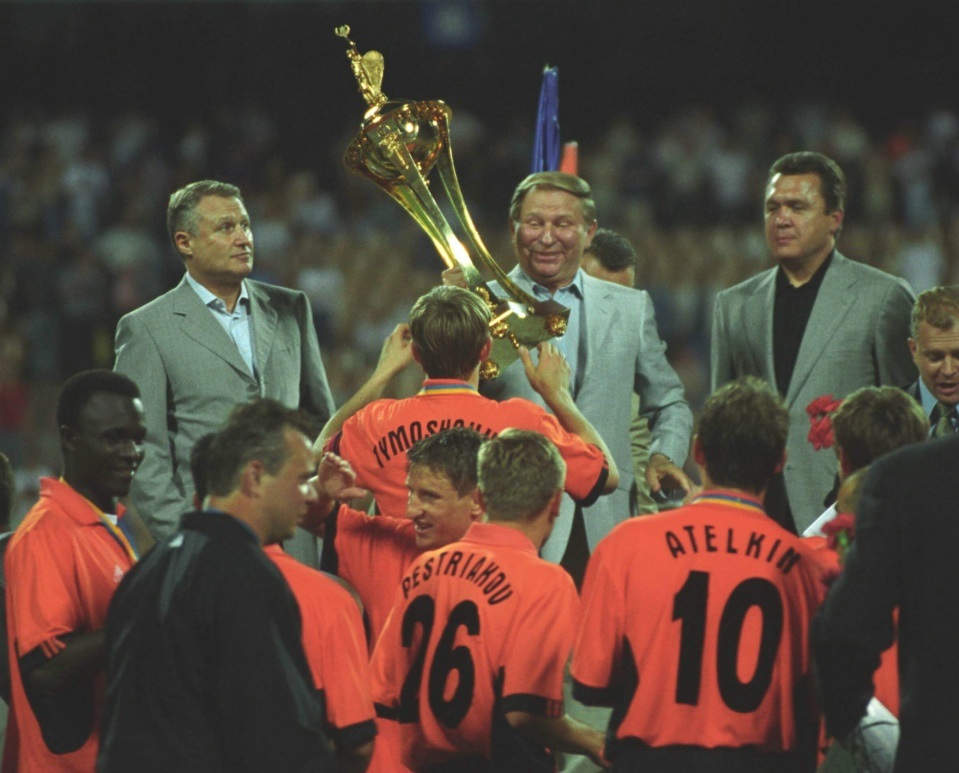
Tymoshchuk lifting the Ukrainian Cup with Shakhtar Donetsk in 2002.

Shakhtar Donetsk-2

- Ukrainian Second League: 1997–98

Shakhtar Donetsk

- Ukrainian Premier League: 2001–02, 2004–05, 2005–06
- Ukrainian Cup: 2000–01, 2001–02, 2003–04
- Ukrainian Super Cup: 2005

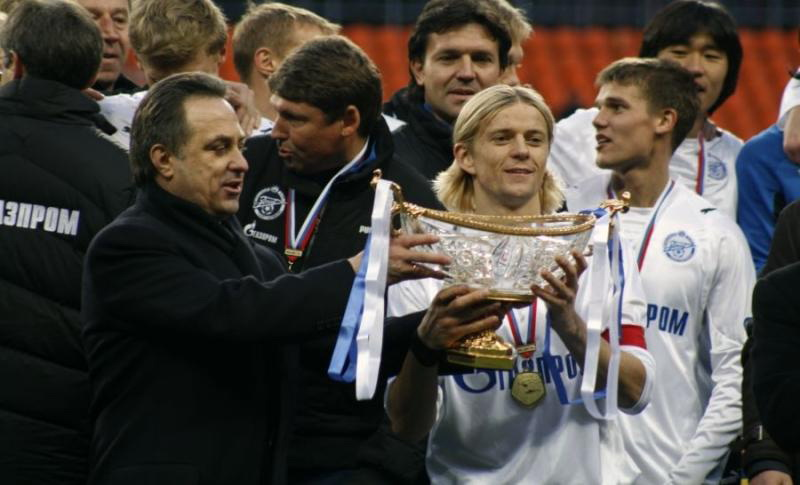
Tymoshchuk holding the Russian Super Cup after victory in 2008.

Zenit Saint Petersburg

- Russian Premier League: 2007, 2014–15
- Russian Super Cup: 2008
- UEFA Cup: 2007–08
- UEFA Super Cup: 2008

Bayern Munich

- Bundesliga: 2009–10, 2012–13
- DFB-Pokal: 2009–10, 2012–13
- DFL-Supercup: 2010, 2012
- UEFA Champions League: 2012–13

Kairat

- Kazakhstan Cup: 2015
- Kazakhstan Super Cup: 2016

Individual

- Ukrainian Bravery Order III Degree: 2006 (rescinded in 2022)
- Ukrainian Footballer of the Year (by Ukrainian Football): 2002, 2006, 2007 (rescinded in 2022)
- Russian Premier League: Player of the Year 2007
- Russian Premier League Top 33 Players – #1 Defensive Midfielder: 2007, 2008
- Honorary citizen of Lutsk: 2008 (rescinded in 2022)
- UEFA awards 100 caps: 2011
- Best Ukrainian Footballer in History (1991–2011) with Andriy Shevchenko and Oleksandr Shovkovskyi(rescinded in 2022)

== See also ==
- List of men's footballers with 100 or more international caps
