= 2008 UEFA Cup final =

- Match programme cover
- Event: 2007–08 UEFA Cup
Zenit Saint Petersburg	Rangers
(Russia)	(Scotland)
2	0
- Date: 14 May 2008
- Venue: City of Manchester Stadium, Manchester
- Man of the Match: Andrey Arshavin (Zenit Saint Petersburg)
- Referee: Peter Fröjdfeldt (Sweden)
- Attendance: 43,878
- Weather: Sunny; 16 °C (61 °F); 43% humidity

The 2008 UEFA Cup final was a football match that took place on 14 May 2008 at the City of Manchester Stadium in Manchester, England. It was the 37th annual final of the UEFA Cup, UEFA's second tier club football tournament.

The match, which was contested by Zenit Saint Petersburg of Russia and Rangers of Scotland, was won 2–0 by Zenit, with goals from Igor Denisov and Konstantin Zyryanov, to claim their first UEFA Cup title, making them only the second Russian side to win the competition, after CSKA Moscow in 2004–05. Zenit went on to play in the 2008 UEFA Super Cup, which they won after beating 2007–08 UEFA Champions League winners Manchester United 2–1.

The fixture is notable for having the largest travelling support in football history, with close to 200,000 Rangers fans travelling to Manchester for the occasion.

== Background ==
Zenit and Rangers had never previously met in European competition, although Rangers had played Russian opposition on 10 prior occasions, winning seven – including a 3–2 win over Dynamo Moscow in the 1972 European Cup Winners' Cup Final – drawing two and losing one. Zenit had never played against Scottish opposition, although they had played in England three times, winning once against Bradford City in the 2000 UEFA Intertoto Cup and losing to Bolton Wanderers in the 2005–06 UEFA Cup and Everton earlier in 2007–08.

Rangers' European record was significantly better than Zenit's going into this match, having reached the final of the Cup Winners' Cup three times – in 1961, 1967 and 1972, winning the last one. By winning the 1972 Cup Winners' Cup, Rangers also played in the 1972 European Super Cup, losing to Ajax of the Netherlands, although this is not considered official by UEFA.

Rangers went into the final four points behind Glasgow rivals Celtic in the Scottish Premier League, albeit with three games left to play, compared to Celtic's one. However, they had already won the League Cup against Dundee United two months earlier and were due to play in the Scottish Cup Final against Queen of the South 10 days after the UEFA Cup final. Because of the difference between the Russian and Scottish football calendars at the time – Russia operated a March–November calendar until 2011 – Zenit had only played six games of their 2008 league season by the time of the UEFA Cup final; however, they had finished the previous season in November 2007 as league winners, as well as reaching the quarter-finals of the 2007–08 Russian Cup and beating Lokomotiv Moscow in the Russian Super Cup in March 2008.

The final pitched former Rangers manager Dick Advocaat, then the manager of Zenit, against incumbent Rangers boss Walter Smith, both of whom had completed the Scottish domestic treble; Smith in 1993, Advocaat in 1999.

== Venue ==
The City of Manchester Stadium was selected as the venue for the 2008 UEFA Cup final at the October 2006 meeting of the UEFA Executive Committee in Ljubljana, Slovenia. Other candidates to host the match included the HSH Nordbank Arena in Hamburg, Germany; the Stadionul Național in Bucharest, Romania; the Ramat Gan Stadium in Tel Aviv District, Israel; and the Şükrü Saracoğlu Stadium in Istanbul, Turkey, which was awarded the 2009 UEFA Cup final.

The stadium was initially built as the primary venue for the 2002 Commonwealth Games, hosted in Manchester, but the athletics track was removed when Manchester City moved from their old Maine Road stadium in 2003. The conversion increased the capacity of the stadium from 41,000 for the Commonwealth Games to almost 48,000. In 2005, the stadium was selected as one of the venues for UEFA Women's Euro 2005, played in five towns across north-west England. The only previous major European final held in Manchester was the 2003 UEFA Champions League Final at Old Trafford between Juventus and Milan.

== Route to the final ==
Note: In all results below, the score of the finalist is given first (H: home; A: away).

(Russia) Zenit Saint Petersburg				Round		(Scotland) Rangers			
UEFA Cup						Champions League			
Opponent	Agg.	1st leg	2nd leg	Initial phase	Qualifying phase	Opponent	Agg.	1st leg	2nd leg
(Slovakia) ViOn Zlaté Moravce	5–0	2–0 (A)	3–0 (H)	Second qualifying round		(Montenegro) Zeta	3–0	2–0 (H)	1–0 (A)
(Belgium) Standard Liège	4–1	3–0 (H)	1–1 (A)	First round	Third qualifying round	(Serbia) Red Star Belgrade	1–0	1–0 (H)	0–0 (A)
Opponent	Result			Group stage (UC, CL)		Opponent	Result		
(Netherlands) AZ	1–1 (H)			Matchday 1		(Germany) VfB Stuttgart	2–1 (H)		
(Greece) AEL	3–2 (A)			Matchday 2		(France) Lyon	3–0 (A)		
(Germany) 1. FC Nürnberg	2–2 (H)			Matchday 3		(Spain) Barcelona	0–0 (H)		
(England) Everton	0–1 (A)			Matchday 4		(Spain) Barcelona	0–2 (A)		
Bye				Matchday 5		(Germany) VfB Stuttgart	2–3 (A)		
N/A				Matchday 6		(France) Lyon	0–3 (H)		
Group A third place: Pos / Team / Pld / Pts; 1 / (England) Everton / 4 / 12; 2 / (Germany) 1. FC Nürnberg / 4 / 7; 3 / (Russia) Zenit Saint Petersburg / 4 / 5; 4 / (Netherlands) AZ / 4 / 4; 5 / (Greece) AEL Larissa / 4 / 0; Source:				Final standings		Group E third place: Pos / Team / Pld / Pts; 1 / (Spain) Barcelona / 6 / 14; 2 / (France) Lyon / 6 / 10; 3 / (Scotland) Rangers / 6 / 7; 4 / (Germany) VfB Stuttgart / 6 / 3; Source: RSSSF			
Group A third place: Pos / Team / Pld / Pts; 1 / (England) Everton / 4 / 12; 2 / (Germany) 1. FC Nürnberg / 4 / 7; 3 / (Russia) Zenit Saint Petersburg / 4 / 5; 4 / (Netherlands) AZ / 4 / 4; 5 / (Greece) AEL Larissa / 4 / 0; Source:						UEFA Cup			
Opponent	Agg.	1st leg	2nd leg	Knockout stage		Opponent	Agg.	1st leg	2nd leg
(Spain) Villarreal	2–2 (a)	1–0 (H)	1–2 (A)	Round of 32		(Greece) Panathinaikos	1–1 (a)	0–0 (H)	1–1 (A)
(France) Marseille	3–3 (a)	1–3 (A)	2–0 (H)	Round of 16		(Germany) Werder Bremen	2–1	2–0 (H)	0–1 (A)
(Germany) Bayer Leverkusen	4–2	4–1 (A)	0–1 (H)	Quarter-finals		(Portugal) Sporting CP	2–0	0–0 (H)	2–0 (A)
(Germany) Bayern Munich	5–1	1–1 (A)	4–0 (H)	Semi-finals		(Italy) Fiorentina	0–0 (4–2 p)	0–0 (H)	0–0 (a.e.t.) (A)

Throughout the season in Europe, Rangers had developed a reputation for being involved in tight games, principally due to their disciplined, defensive tactics which nullified opponents – scoring 16 goals and only conceding 11 in their 18 matches in the two competitions. This approach intensified after dropping into the UEFA Cup, with none of their matches involving more than two goals; there were four 0–0 draws amongst the eight matches. This cautious tactical approach drew both criticism (for the largely unexciting and unattractive football which resulted from the tactics) and praise (for successfully limiting the opportunities created by their opponents, all of whom were considered to have more skilful, dangerous players than Rangers).

Zenit were considered by the clubs of Western Europe to be a more unpredictable opponent (although not an unknown quantity, as they had reached the quarterfinals of the 2005–06 UEFA Cup and had won the 2007 Russian Premier League). In contrast to their opponents in the final, they scored 28 and conceded 15 in their 16 UEFA Cup games, which included impressive wins over Bayer Leverkusen and Bayern Munich by large margins, but also defeats by Everton, Villarreal and Marseille which had seen them close to elimination.

== Pre-match ==
=== Identity ===
For the past few years, like the Champions League final, each UEFA Cup final was branded with a unique visual identity. The identity of the 2008 final, unveiled at a ceremony at the City of Manchester Stadium on 6 December 2007, was created by Manchester artist Liam Spencer, who is known for his paintings of the Manchester area; the series of paintings produced for the 2008 UEFA Cup final combines inspiration taken from both the UEFA Cup branding and the City of Manchester Stadium itself.

=== Ambassador ===
European Cup winner and Manchester United legend Denis Law, who also played for Manchester City was appointed as ambassador of the final.

=== Ticketing ===
Zenit and Michel Platini asked the British government to ease visa procedures for Russian fans, despite Russia having cancelled visas for British fans travelling to 2008 UEFA Champions League Final in Moscow. However, the Director for British Visa Services for the CIS, Mandy Ivemy, said that "for the U.K. government, visas and biometric checks are a vital part of immigration policy, and we are not prepared to waive them".

Meanwhile, there was a mass flow of Rangers fans into Manchester. An estimated 150,000-200,000 Rangers supporters descended upon the city, despite the club's official ticket allocation being just 13,000 and police requests for fans to stay at home. The influx of people resulted in there being no vacant hotel rooms in a twenty-mile radius of the city and the total amount of money that was ploughed into the local economy was estimated to be around £25 million.

Rangers' home ground, Ibrox, was opened to show a live beamback of the match to 25,000 spectators. Fans were turned away when the capacity was reached more than two hours before kick-off.

=== Team selection ===
Zenit were without the competition's top scorer, Pavel Pogrebnyak, who had picked up two bookings in the knockout stages of the tournament and was therefore suspended. However, they were able to call upon their other star names such as attacking midfielders Andrey Arshavin and Konstantin Zyryanov, as well as holding midfielder Anatoliy Tymoshchuk.

Rangers manager Walter Smith started with Jean-Claude Darcheville on his own up-front, with a five-man midfield supporting him comprising Steven Davis, Kevin Thomson, Steven Whittaker, Barry Ferguson and Brahim Hemdani. Neil Alexander was making his tenth start in goal for Rangers following his arrival in January 2008, with first choice keeper Allan McGregor injured. Other notable absentees included right-back Alan Hutton who had transferred to Tottenham Hotspur, and forward Steven Naismith who had sustained a serious injury.

== Match ==
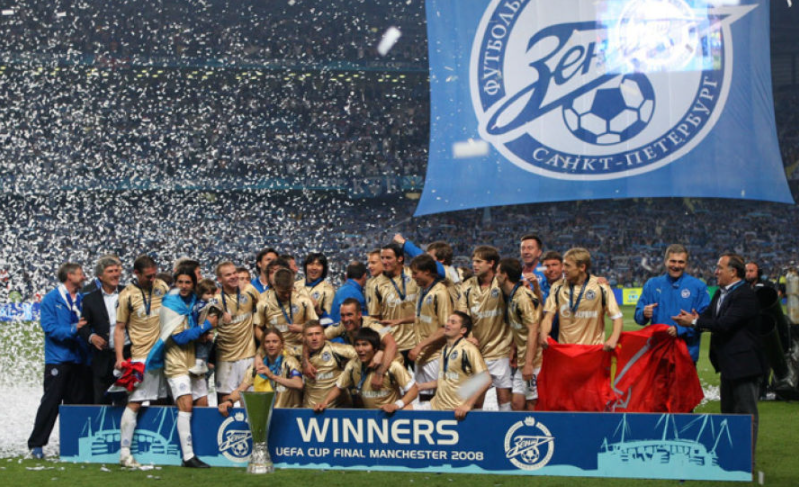
Zenit won the match 2–0 to claim their first UEFA Cup title.

=== Details ===
14 May 2008
19:45 UTC+1

Zenit Saint Petersburg (Russia)	2–0	(Scotland) Rangers
Denisov 72'; Zyryanov 90+4'	Report

City of Manchester Stadium, Manchester
Attendance: 43,878
Referee: Peter Fröjdfeldt (Sweden)

Zenit; Saint Petersburg	Rangers

GK	16	(Russia) Vyacheslav Malafeev	(yellow card) 90+2'
CB	44	(Ukraine) Anatoliy Tymoshchuk (c)
CB	4	(Croatia) Ivica Križanac
CB	27	(Russia) Igor Denisov	(yellow card) 72'
RM	22	(Russia) Aleksandr Anyukov
CM	18	(Russia) Konstantin Zyryanov
CM	20	(Russia) Viktor Fayzulin		(substituted off) 90+3'
CM	15	(Russia) Roman Shirokov
LM	11	(Czech Republic) Radek Šírl
SS	10	(Russia) Andrey Arshavin
CF	9	(Turkey) Fatih Tekke
Substitutes:
GK	1	(Slovakia) Kamil Čontofalský
DF	5	(South Korea) Kim Dong-jin		(substituted on) 90+3'
MF	2	(Russia) Vladislav Radimov
MF	25	(Netherlands) Fernando Ricksen
MF	88	(Ukraine) Oleksandr Horshkov
FW	7	(Argentina) Alejandro Domínguez
FW	57	(Russia) Aleksei Ionov
Manager:
(Netherlands) Dick Advocaat

GK	13	(Scotland) Neil Alexander
RB	7	(Algeria) Brahim Hemdani		(substituted off) 80'
CB	3	(Scotland) David Weir
CB	24	(Spain) Carlos Cuéllar
LB	6	(Scotland) Barry Ferguson (c)
RM	21	(Scotland) Kirk Broadfoot	(yellow card) 90+4'
CM	8	(Scotland) Kevin Thomson
CM	35	(Northern Ireland) Steven Davis
LM	5	(Bosnia and Herzegovina) Saša Papac		(substituted off) 77'
SS	28	(Scotland) Steven Whittaker		(substituted off) 86'
CF	19	(France) Jean-Claude Darcheville
Substitutes:
GK	16	(Scotland) Graeme Smith
DF	30	(Scotland) Christian Dailly
MF	11	(Scotland) Charlie Adam
MF	39	(Senegal) Amdy Faye
FW	9	(Scotland) Kris Boyd		(substituted on) 86'
FW	10	(Spain) Nacho Novo		(substituted on) 77'
FW	27	(Scotland) Lee McCulloch		(substituted on) 80'
Manager:
(Scotland) Walter Smith

Man of the Match:
Andrey Arshavin (Zenit Saint Petersburg)

Assistant referees:
Stefan Wittberg (Sweden)
Henrik Andrén (Sweden)
Fourth official:
Martin Ingvarsson (Sweden)

Match rules

- 90 minutes
- 30 minutes of extra time if necessary
- Penalty shoot-out if scores still level
- Seven named substitutes
- Maximum of three substitutions

=== Statistics ===
First half
Statistic	Zenit Saint Petersburg	Rangers
Goals scored	0	0
Total shots	10	3
Shots on target	4	0
Saves	0	4
Ball possession	59%	41%
Corner kicks	4	0
Fouls committed	7	4
Offsides	1	0
Yellow cards	0	0
Red cards	0	0

Second half
Statistic	Zenit Saint Petersburg	Rangers
Goals scored	2	0
Total shots	9	5
Shots on target	4	3
Saves	2	1
Ball possession	53%	47%
Corner kicks	5	2
Fouls committed	5	8
Offsides	2	0
Yellow cards	2	1
Red cards	0	0

Overall
Statistic	Zenit Saint Petersburg	Rangers
Goals scored	2	0
Total shots	19	8
Shots on target	8	3
Saves	2	5
Ball possession	56%	44%
Corner kicks	9	2
Fouls committed	12	12
Offsides	3	0
Yellow cards	2	1
Red cards	0	0

== Fan violence ==
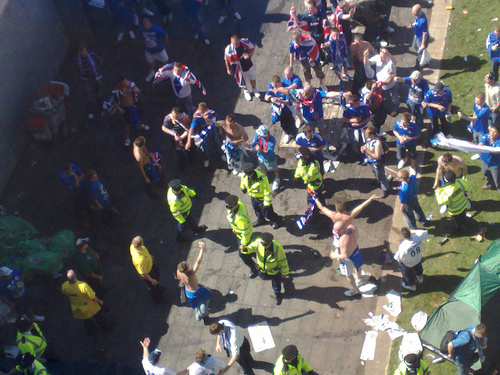
Police split Zenit and Rangers fans

The event was marred by Rangers supporters rioting in Manchester city centre; these riots started after a big screen that was due to show the match had failed. BBC News 24 interrupted normal programming to broadcast the riots live on television and ITN's flagship News at Ten programme gave extensive coverage to the riots.

A Zenit fan was also attacked and stabbed, although it was later established that Rangers supporters were not responsible. Eleven people were convicted of rioting and given prison sentences varying from six months to 3 1/2 years in September 2010.

== See also ==
- 2008 UEFA Champions League final
- 2008 UEFA Super Cup
- FC Zenit Saint Petersburg in European football
- Rangers F.C. in European football
- 2008 FC Zenit Saint Petersburg season
- 2007–08 Rangers F.C. season
