= 1999–2000 Vyshcha Liha =

9th season of top-tier football league in Vyshcha Liha

Vyshcha Liha
- Season: 1999–2000
- Dates: 12 July 1999 – 20 June 2000; 4 December 1999 – 18 March 2000 (winter break)
- Champions: Dynamo Kyiv; 8th title
- Relegated: Chornomorets Odesa; Zirka Kirovohrad; Prykarpattya Ivano-Frankivsk
- Champions League: Dynamo Kyiv; Shakhtar Donetsk
- UEFA Cup: Vorskla Poltava; Kryvbas Kryvyi Rih
- Matches played: 240
- Top goalscorer: (20) Maksim Shatskikh (Dynamo)
- Biggest home win: Dynamo - Prykarpattia 6:0
- Biggest away win: Metalist - Dynamo 0:5
- Highest scoring: Zirka - Shakhtar 2:6

The 1999–2000 Vyshcha Liha season was the 9th top-level football club competition since its establishment and the 4th since the establishment of the Professional Football League (PFL). FC Dynamo Kyiv were the defending champions.

The competitions started in just over three weeks after the completion of the previous 1998–99 season, which ended on June 25, 1999. At the same time, the mid-season winter break lasted over three months.

It was planned to reduce the number of participants to 14 for next season; therefore, three teams were scheduled to be relegated this season.

== Teams ==
This season, the Vyshcha Liha remained at 16 teams.

=== Promotions ===
- Chornomorets Odesa, the runners-up of the 1998–99 Ukrainian First League – (returning after absence of a season)

=== Relegated teams ===
- SC Mykolaiv – relegated after a season in the top flight.

=== Location ===
Locations of teams home grounds in Ukrainian Premier League 1999-2000

=== Stadiums ===
The following stadiums are regarded as home grounds:

Rank	Stadium	Place	Club	Capacity	Notes
1	Olimpiyskyi NSC	Kyiv	CSKA Kyiv	83,450	used as home ground in 2 match(es)
2	ChMP	Odesa	Chornomorets Odesa	43,000	
3	Metalist	Kharkiv	Metalist Kharkiv	32,000	
4	Shakhtar	Donetsk	Shakhtar Donetsk	31,545	
4	Shakhtar	Donetsk	Metalurh Donetsk	31,545	used as home ground in 4 match(es)
5	Meteor	Dnipropetrovsk	Dnipro Dnipropetrovsk	30,000	
6	Metalurh	Kryvyi Rih	Kryvbas Kryvyi Rih	29,783	
7	Ukraina	Lviv	Karpaty Lviv	28,051	
8	Lokomotyv	Simferopol	Tavriya Simferopol	26,000	
9	Metalurh	Zaporizhia	Metalurh Zaporizhia	25,000	
10	Vorskla	Poltava	Vorskla Poltava	24,795	
11	Miskyi	Ternopil	Nyva Ternopil	17,000	
12	SKA	Lviv	Karpaty Lviv	17,000	used as home ground in 4 match(es)
13	Dynamo	Kyiv	Dynamo Kyiv	16,873	
14	Rukh	Ivano-Frankivsk	Prykarpattia Ivano-Frankivsk	15,000	
15	Zirka	Kirovohrad	Zirka Kirovohrad	14,628	
16	CSK ZSU	Kyiv	CSKA Kyiv	12,000	
17	Avanhard	Makiivka	Shakhtar Donetsk	10,000	used as home ground in 1 match(es)
18	Azovstal	Mariupol	Metalurh Mariupol	9,000	
19	Mashynobudivnyk	Druzhkivka	Metalurh Donetsk	5,000	used as home ground in 1 match(es)
20	125-richia DMZ	Donetsk	Metalurh Donetsk	4,000	

== Managers ==
Club	Coach	Replaced coach
FC Dynamo Kyiv	(Ukraine) Valery Lobanovsky	
FC Shakhtar Donetsk	(Ukraine) Viktor Prokopenko	(Russia) Anatoliy Byshovets 8 games (Ukraine) Oleksiy Drozdenko 6 games
FC Kryvbas Kryvyi Rih	(Ukraine) Oleh Taran	
FC Vorskla Poltava	(Ukraine) Anatoliy Konkov	
FC Metalist Kharkiv	(Ukraine) Mykhailo Fomenko	
FC Metalurh Zaporizhzhia	(Ukraine) Myron Markevych	
FC Metalurh Donetsk	(Ukraine) Semen Altman	(Ukraine) Mykhailo Sokolovskyi 5 games
FC Metalurh Mariupol	(Ukraine) Mykola Pavlov	
FC Karpaty Lviv	(Ukraine) Lev Brovarskyi	
FC CSKA Kyiv	(Ukraine) Volodymyr Bezsonov	
FC Dnipro Dnipropetrovsk	(Ukraine) Mykola Fedorenko	(Ukraine) Leonid Koltun 2 games
FC Nyva Ternopil	(Ukraine) Valeriy Bohuslavskyi	
SC Tavriya Simferopol	(Ukraine) Volodymyr Muntian	(Ukraine) Anatoliy Korobochka the first half
FC Prykarpattia Ivano-Frankivsk	(Ukraine) Serhiy Morozov	(Ukraine) Ihor Yavorskyi 12 games (Ukraine) Anatoliy Boyko 2 games
FC Chornomorets Odesa	(Ukraine) Anatoliy Azarenkov	(Ukraine) Oleksandr Holokolosov 7 games (Ukraine) Valeriy Melnyk 2 games
FC Zirka Kirovohrad	(Ukraine) Yuriy Koval	(Ukraine) Oleksandr Ischenko 5 games

=== Managerial changes ===
Team	Outgoing head coach	Manner of departure	Date of vacancy	Table	Incoming head coach	Date of appointment
FC Nyva Ternopil	(Ukraine) Ihor Yurchenko			pre-season	(Ukraine) Valeriy Bohuslavsky	
FC Karpaty Lviv	(Ukraine) Stepan Yurchyshyn			pre-season	(Ukraine) Lev Brovarsky	
Shakhtar Donetsk	(Russia) Anatoliy Byshovets	Resigned	5 October 1999	7th	(Ukraine) Oleksiy Drozdenko (interim)	5 October 1999

== League table ==
Pos	Team	Pld	W	D	L	GF	GA	GD	Pts	Qualification or relegation
1	Dynamo Kyiv (Note: Participant of the 2000 Ukrainian Cup Final) (C)	30	27	3	0	85	18	+67	84	Qualification to Champions League third qualifying round
2	Shakhtar Donetsk	30	21	3	6	60	16	+44	66	Qualification to Champions League second qualifying round
3	Kryvbas Kryvyi Rih	30	18	6	6	54	30	+24	60	Qualification to UEFA Cup first round
4	Vorskla Poltava	30	14	7	9	50	34	+16	49	Qualification to UEFA Cup qualifying round
5	Metalist Kharkiv	30	12	8	10	41	39	+2	44 (Note: Even on head-to-head points, away goals scored: Metalist +1, M. Zaporizhia 0.)	
6	Metalurh Zaporizhzhia	30	12	8	10	43	35	+8	44	
7	Metalurh Donetsk	30	11	10	9	39	35	+4	43	
8	Metalurh Mariupol	30	13	3	14	49	48	+1	42	
9	Karpaty Lviv	30	12	4	14	39	38	+1	40	
10	CSKA Kyiv	30	9	8	13	31	36	−5	35	
11	Dnipro Dnipropetrovsk	30	8	9	13	26	52	−26	33	
12	Nyva Ternopil	30	7	10	13	40	57	−17	31	
13	Tavriya Simferopol	30	7	8	15	32	51	−19	29 (Note: Head-to-head points: Tavriya 6, Prykarpattia 0.)	
14	Prykarpattya Ivano-Frankivsk (R)	30	7	8	15	27	47	−20	29	Relegated to Ukrainian First League
15	Chornomorets Odesa (R)	30	6	8	16	20	50	−30	26	Relegated to Ukrainian First League
16	Zirka Kirovohrad (R)	30	0	9	21	16	66	−50	9	Relegated to Ukrainian First League

Source: uafootball.net.ua, www.rsssf.org
(C) Champions; (R) Relegated

== Results ==
Home \ Away	CHO	CSK	DNI	DYN	KAR	KRY	MET	MDO	MTM	MZA	NVT	PRY	SHA	TAV	VOR	ZIR
Chornomorets Odesa	—	2–0	-:+ (Note: Originally, the match Chornomorets v Dnipro that took place on April 22, 2000, ended in a 2:2 tie. The Professional Football League of Ukraine awarded a technical win to Dnipro and a loss to Chornomorets for fielding Dmytro Karyaka for Chornomorets.)	2–2	0–0	2–0	0–1	0–1	3–4	1–0	1–0	0–0	0–3	1–2	1–1	1–0
CSKA Kyiv	3–0	—	3–0	0–3	2–3	1–2	0–1	1–0	1–1	1–0	0–0	2–1	1–0	3–0	1–1	3–0
Dnipro	1–1	2–1 (Note: Scheduled on August 15, 1999, it was postponed and played on October 20, 1999, due to call-up of their players to the Ukraine national football team.)	—	0–2	1–1	1–0	1–0	0–1	1–0	0–2	1–1	1–1	1–2	1–0	2–1	2–0
Dynamo Kyiv	4–1	3–1	4–0	—	3–0	2–1	2–1	1–0	6–1	2–0 (Note: Originally, the match Dynamo v M. Zaporizhia was scheduled to take place on August 1, 1999, but was postponed and played on November 21, 1999. The Professional Football League approved the game postponement to accommodate Dynamo, which was scheduled to play Zalgiris in the 1999–2000 UEFA Champions League on August 4, 1999.)	4–1	6–0	2–1	2–0	3–0	3–0
Karpaty Lviv	5–0	1–0	4–0	2–3	—	1–0	1–1	1–1	3–1	1–0	0–1	0–1	1–0	0–1	3–1	3–0
Kryvbas Kryvyi Rih	2–0	2–1	2–2	1–1	2–1	—	2–0	0–0	2–1	1–0	5–1	3–0	1–0	2–1	4–0	3–1
Metalist Kharkiv	1–1	2–0	2–1	0–5	1–0	1–1	—	2–1	2–0	0–0	5–2	2–0	0–1	2–1	2–1	4–0
Metalurh Donetsk	4–0	0–0	5–1	0–4	2–1	0–0	1–1	—	2–1	2–1	3–2	4–1	2–3	0–0	2–3	2–0
Metalurh Mariupol	5–0	2–0	3–2	2–3	1–0	0–2	3–1	4–1	—	1–1	2–1	2–0	1–2	4–1	2–1	3–0
Metalurh Zaporizhzhia	2–0	2–2	6–1	0–3	3–1	1–2	1–1	1–1	2–1	—	4–0	2–2	1–0	3–2	3–1	2–0
Nyva Ternopil	3–1	2–2	1–1	0–1	1–2	3–3 (Note: Scheduled on August 15, 1999, it was postponed and played on October 12, 1999, as Kryvbas participated in the European competitions.)	2–1	3–0	2–1	0–3	—	3–1	1–1	1–1	1–1	3–0
Prykarpattya Ivano-Frankivsk	1–0	0–0	1–1	1–2	3–1	1–3	2–1	1–1	3–0	0–0	2–1	—	0–2	0–2	0–1	4–2
Shakhtar Donetsk	0–1	3–0	2–0	0–0 (Note: Scheduled on August 15, 1999, it was postponed and played on November 29, 1999, as both teams participated in European competitions and call-up of their players to the Ukraine national football team.)	4–0	3–1	3–1	2–0	3–0	4–0	5–0	1–0	—	2–0	0–0	1–0
Tavriya Simferopol	1–1	1–2	1–1	1–3	4–1	2–4	2–2	1–1	1–0	1–2	1–1	1–0	0–3	—	0–3	2–0
Vorskla Poltava	4–0	2–0	4–0	1–2	1–0	3–0	3–1	0–0	1–1	3–0	4–2	2–0	0–3	4–0	—	1–1
Zirka Kirovohrad	0–0	0–0	1–1	1–4	0–2	0–3	2–2	0–2	1–2	1–1	1–1	1–1	2–6	2–2	0–2	—

Source: uafootball.net.ua
Legend: Blue = home team win; Yellow = draw; Red = away team win.

== Top goalscorers ==
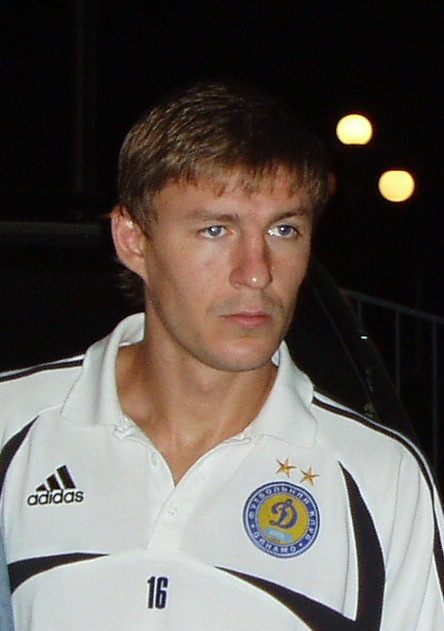
Shatskikh

(Uzbekistan) Maksim Shatskikh	Dynamo Kyiv	20 (1)
(Ukraine) Ivan Hetsko	Karpaty Lviv / Kryvbas Kryvyi Rih	19 (1) (10 goals for Karpaty Lviv)
(Ukraine) Serhii Rebrov	Dynamo Kyiv	18 (6)
(Ukraine) Andriy Vorobei	Shakhtar Donetsk	15 (1)
(Ukraine) Kostyantyn Babych	Metalurh Mariupol	12
(Georgia (country)) Avtandil Kapanadze	Nyva Ternopil	12
(Ukraine) Hennady Zubov	Shakhtar Donetsk	12 (4)
(Ukraine) Oleksandr Haidash	Tavriya Simferopol / Metalurh Mariupol	10
(Ukraine) Volodymyr Maziar	Vorskla Poltava	10
(Ukraine) Viktor Ivanenko	Metalist Kharkiv	10 (3)
(Ukraine) Hennadiy Moroz	Kryvbas Kryvyi Rih	10 (6)

Notable Transfers

- Serhii Rebrov, FC Dynamo Kyiv to Tottenham Hotspur F.C.
- Hennadiy Moroz, FC Kryvbas Kryvyi Rih to FC Dynamo Kyiv
