= Slavonic Channel International =

International TV channel

- Type: Broadcast television network
- Country: Ukraine
- Owner: Valeriya V. Ivanenko
- Launch date: December 14, 1994
- Picture format: 4:3 (576i, SDTV)
- Official website: https://slav.tv/

Slavonic Channel International (Ukrainian: Міжнародний Слов'янський Канал, liter.: "mizhnarodny slov'yans'ky kanal", Russian: Международный Славянский Канал) is an international TV channel from Ukraine about Slavic culture, history and achievements. It broadcasts in Ukrainian, as well as in English and Russian, with plans to expand to other languages.

Creating a global ethnical informative Slavonic Channel International (SCI) focused on the international audience. In the international television space, where you can find channels of various thematic nature, there is a growing need for information sources that provide both a large picture and a profound exploration of diverse aspects of various cultures.

The Slavic countries occupy 73% of the territory of Europe. They include: Belarus, Bulgaria, Bosnia and Herzegovina, Croatia, Czech Republic, Montenegro, North Macedonia, Poland, Russia, Serbia, Slovak Republic, Slovenia, and Ukraine. The first European global ethnic informative television project Slavonic Channel International's task is to present the largest European pan-ethnic group to the world in an informative way based on equal contributions from each of the Slavic states, treated with equal respect.

== History ==
TV channel SCI was founded on December 14, 1994, headed by its original President Volodymyr O. Ivanenko and Valeriya V. Ivanenko.

== Broadcasting ==
- Sirius-4 satellite, 5° east, frequency 12072 MHz (H), symbol rate: 27,5 Msymb/s FEC 3/4
- Astra-2 satellite 31, 5° east, frequency 12090 MHz (H), vertical symbol rate: 27,5 Msymb/s FEC 9/10.

== Ownership and staff ==
- General Director is Valeriya V. Ivanenko.
