= Volodymyr Ivanenko (television executive) =

Ukrainian television executive

Volodymyr Oleksandrovych Ivanenko
- Born: 21 January 1954; Russian SFSR, Crimean Oblast, Kerch
- Died: 15 October 2006 (aged 52); Ukraine, Kyiv Oblast, Kyiv

Volodymyr Oleksandrovych Ivanenko (Ukrainian: Володимир Олександрович Іваненко) was founder of the first nongovernmental cable and essential television network in the USSR (1988); initiator and organizer of the first direct satellite broadcast from the territory of the former USSR (1994); founder of the first nongovernmental TV stations in Ukraine: TONIS and TET; television and cinema producer; and public figure.

== Education ==
His father was a career military man. From 1961 to 1971 he attended a school in Simferopol. In 1974 he enrolled into Admiral Makarov National University of Shipbuilding in Mykolaiv, and successfully graduated in 1980.

== Career ==
After graduation from the National University of Shipbuilding, Vladimir Ivanenko proceeded to work at the Central Research Institute of Shipbuilding Technology in Mykolaiv. This period is marked by several authors' certificates for innovative developments in the field of shipbuilding.

For several years Vladimir Ivanenko worked at the criminal investigation department of the Ministry of Internal Affairs in Mykolaiv. He resigned his post as captain after becoming enamored with the idea unprecedented in those days: that of creating a nongovernmental TV broadcast in the USSR.

== Dreaming about independent television ==
Years 1987 and 1988 were completely dedicated to creating the first nongovernmental cable television network in the USSR. Having managed to schedule a meeting with academician Dmitry Likhachev and Raisa Gorbacheva at the Soviet Culture Fund, Vladimir was able to convince them to support the idea of the channel.

On February 13, 1988, in Mykolaiv (then part of Ukrainian SSR), the first experimental Youth Video Channel (“Molodezhny Videokanal”) started broadcasting on the grounds of Mykolaiv City Komsomol Committee. Vladimir Ivanenko became the channel's first Director.

In late 1988, Youth Video Channel left the care of City Komsomol Committee. At Vladimir Ivanenko's initiative the name was changed to Creative Union of New Informational Systems (“Tvorcheskoye Obyedinenie Novykh Informatsionnykh Sistem”, shortened to TONIS).

In 1991, during the self-declared State Emergency Committee, TONIS (or Channel-22) became the only source of independent broadcast in southern Ukraine. The channel prepared stories for the popular youth program by Moscow's Ostankino studio, Look (“Vzglyad”).

It is symbolic that the TONIS independent television company launched its broadcast in early 1990 with the help of a transmitter (capacity of 1 kW) placed on a tower which had been previously used by KGB to silence foreign radio stations. In late 1991 TONIS moved its headquarters from Mykovaiv to Kyiv and was eventually renamed to TET-a-TET (TONIS-Enter Television).

== International TONIS Union ==
In early 1992 Vladimir Ivanenko initiated the first congress of independent TV companies in Kharkiv (Ukraine) under the slogan “For copyright protection”. It was at that congress that the International TONIS Union was created. Vladimir Ivanenko was unanimously chosen as its president, and he successfully united more than 80 cable and essential broadcasters from different regions of the former USSR under the brand name TONIS. Large regional centers emerged: TONIS-South (Mykolaiv, Ukraine); Tonis-Center (Kharkiv, Ukraine); TONIS-Asia (Tashkent, the capital of Uzbekistan); TONIS-Orenburg; TONIS-Vladivistok; TONIS-Tumen... Thus, for the first time in the history of the former USSR a powerful nongovernmental essential cable resource had been created. In 2002 Vladimir Ivanenko headed the board of the Garant-Media-International Agency for the Protection of Copyright and Related Rights.

== Production Activity ==
Vladimir Ivanenko was one of the first independent producers on the territory of the former USSR. He produced such films as «The Passion According to Vladimir» (director Mark Rozovski); «Winter Cherry 2» (director Igor Maslennikov); «Men's Games» (director Andrey Rostotski). In 1991 Vladimir Ivanenko became one of the initiators and organizers of the legendary Pierre Cardin's show on the Red Square in Moscow.

== The Velvet Season International Television Program Festival ==
In 1993 Vladimir and Valeria Ivanenko organized and successfully carried out the first Velvet Season (“Barkhatny Sezon”) international television program festival. 10 festivals were held.

== Slavonic Channel International ==
During 16 years of his life and until his very last day Vladimir Ivanenko was engaged in the implementation of the project called “Slavonic Channel International”. “- The most important thing for Ukraine today is to break through the informational space, meaning it has to find the means to create a network of ground reception in Europe and neighboring countries. (...) - SCI broadcasts from Kyiv, the oldest Slavic capital. Ukraine has sufficient authority in Europe and the decision suggests itself: basing the largest informational system of European scale in Kyiv.” “Shalwar trousers won't help us join Europe” (Secret Materials publishing house, February 1995).

“- Slavonic Channel International is a real chance for our country to enter the international informational arena, make itself known to the world not only for our shalwar trousers, flower chains and hopak dancing, but for the generosity, originality and talents of our people; for the beauty and richness of our country. By learning to value ourselves, respect our country, we will make the world value and respect us.

- We believe that creating an international television center of this kind, one that has real political and economical influence in European countries, can not only increase Ukraine's authority but also attract much needed investments to our country. - Having an independent satellite channel on the territory of Europe will strengthen the ties with diaspora and become a source of objective information about Ukraine. - … my dream: in any city of the Earth, any family will be able to push a button on their TV and watch our channel. I believe that one day this will happen.” “Slavonic Channel is not only for Slavs” (Vseukrainskie Vesti, September 1994).

After obtaining a special authorization from the Ukrainian government, through a satellite trunk rented from the EUTELSAT International Space Corporation, in December 1994 a team headed by Vladimir Ivanenko with the assistance of Ukrainian BRT Concern launched and for the first time in CIS countries successfully carried out direct satellite broadcast for the European continent, North Africa and the Middle East. The content of the innovation was constituted by SCI programs.

Ivanenko declined the offer from the Russian Union of Oil Producers about broadcasting the channel from the territory of the Russian Federation. Until the end of his days he was convinced that Slavonic Channel International as a platform for joint broadcast for 13 independent countries needed to be located on the territory of Ukraine, in Kyiv – the ancient Slavic capital.

The emergence of a new thematic channel was a noticeable occurrence in the field of international television, which was confirmed at the most prestigious congress on television industry, European Forum on Television in Rome in October 1995. Most of the world's informational agencies reported on this question being raised at the forum.

In his book called Television de facto, theoretician Ivan Mashchenko wrote: “It was a break-through in space telecasting on the territory of the former USSR. The six-month broadcast (14.12.1994 – 15.05.1995) covered Europe, North America and Middle East: the territory populated by 550 ml people in total.”

SCI's experimental broadcast had been funded by the project's author. There were two obstacles in the way of its further implementation: the country's lack of enabling environment for attracting investments from abroad, and the high cost of technology required to conduct broadcast with several different language tracks.

This reduced the possibilities for channel's distribution in other countries and would have undoubtedly affected the commercial component of the global project. These factors caused SCI's authors to put the project on hold in May 1995.

At the same time, the six months of broadcasting confirmed Slavonic Channel International's ability to occupy a prominent position among other thematic projects addressed to the audience all around the globe. The authors of the project had seen proof that SCI should not focus solely on the Slavic countries and Slavic diaspora. The largest amount of positive feedback had been received from non-Slavic countries: Germany, France, England, Italy, Portugal and Israel.

Up to 2003, Ivanenko was responsible for the organization and conduct of The Velvet Season international television program festival, while remaining the president of TONIS, the television company he had created.

From early 2006 and up until his death, Ivanenko was the CEO of Slavonic Channel International (SCI), and working on its updated concept of broadcasting since 2005.

Vladimir Ivanenko died on October 15, 2006. He is buried in Baikove cemetery in Kyiv.

== Honors and awards ==
- 2000 – Member of the International Academy of Television and Radio Broadcasting;
- 2001 – Member of the Eurasian Academy of Television;
- 2000 – The Golden Quill award by the National Union of Journalists of Ukraine;
- 2001 – The Golden Quill award by the National Union of Journalists of Ukraine;
- 2002 – Laureate of the Prometheus-Prestige award (national program Man of the Year 2002) in the category Cultural Project of the Year as the author and organizer of The Velvet Season.
