= Lev Brovarskyi =

Soviet footballer and Ukrainian coach

Personal information
- Full name: Lev Rudolfovych Brovarskyi
- Date of birth: 30 November 1948
- Place of birth: Drohobych, Ukrainian SSR
- Date of death: 4 June 2009 (aged 60)
- Place of death: Lviv, Ukraine
- Position: Midfielder

Senior career*
Years	Team	Apps	(Gls)
1966–1967	Naftovyk Drohobych	57	(7)
1968–1980	Karpaty Lviv	419	(48)
1981	Dnipro Dnipropetrovsk	0	(0)

International career
1971	Soviet Union	1	(0)

Managerial career
- 1989: Cameroon U19
- 1999–2000: Karpaty Lviv
- 2001–2002: Karpaty Lviv
- * Club domestic league appearances and goals

Lev Rudolfovych Brovarskyi (Ukrainian: Лев Рудольфович Броварський) (30 November 1948 – 4 June 2009) was a Soviet football player and a Ukrainian coach.

== Honours ==
- Soviet Cup winner: 1969

== International career ==
Brovarskyi played his only game for USSR on 28 April 1971 in a friendly match against Bulgaria.
