= FC Zenit Saint Petersburg in European football =

Russian club in European football

- Club: Zenit Saint Petersburg
- First entry: 1981–82 UEFA Cup
- Latest entry: 2021–22 UEFA Europa League

Titles
- Europa League: 1 (2008)
- Super Cup: 1 (2008)

FC Zenit Saint Petersburg is a Russian football club that was founded in 1925. The club first qualified for UEFA competition as Zenit Leningrad in 1980, when they finished third in the Soviet Top League to reach the 1981–82 UEFA Cup as representatives of the Soviet Union; however, they were knocked out in the first round by Dynamo Dresden of East Germany, losing 6–2 on aggregate. They qualified for the European Cup for the first time in 1985–86 after winning the 1984 Soviet Top League. They qualified for the UEFA Cup twice more before the break-up of the Soviet Union (in 1987–88 and 1989–90), but then had to wait 10 years for another appearance.

After winning the 1998–99 Russian Cup, Zenit qualified for the 1999–2000 UEFA Cup but were again eliminated in the first round by Italian club Bologna, losing 5–2 on aggregate. The 2000s saw Zenit qualify for the UEFA Cup four times – they were knocked out in the first round in 2002–03, the group stage in 2004–05 and the quarter-finals in 2005–06 before claiming their first European title by beating Scottish club Rangers 2–0 in the 2008 UEFA Cup Final at the City of Manchester Stadium. This win meant that they would play in the 2008 UEFA Super Cup against Champions League winners Manchester United, whom they beat 2–1. Following their first three Russian Premier League titles in 2007, 2010 and 2011–12, they qualified for the European Cup (now the UEFA Champions League) for the first time in 20 years, but they have yet to get past the round of 16 stage.

== Matches ==
| Season | Competition | Round | Opposition | Score |
|---|---|---|---|---|
| 1981–82 | UEFA Cup | First round | (East Germany) Dynamo Dresden | 1–2 (H), 1–4 (A) |
| 1985–86 | European Cup | First round | (Norway) Vålerenga | 2–0 (H), 2–0 (A) |
| 1985–86 | European Cup | Second round | (Finland) Kuusysi | 2–1 (H), 1–3 (A) |
| 1987–88 | UEFA Cup | First round | (Belgium) Club Brugge | 2–0 (H), 0–5 (A) |
| 1989–90 | UEFA Cup | First round | (Denmark) Næstved | 3–1 (H), 0–0 (A) |
| 1989–90 | UEFA Cup | Second round | (West Germany) Stuttgart | 0–1 (H), 0–5 (A) |
| 1999–2000 | UEFA Cup | First round | (Italy) Bologna | 0–3 (H), 2–2 (A) |
| 2000 | Intertoto Cup | Second round | (Slovenia) Primorje | 3–0 (H), 3–1 (A) |
| 2000 | Intertoto Cup | Third round | (Hungary) Tatabánya | 2–1 (H), 2–1 (A) |
| 2000 | Intertoto Cup | Semi-final | (England) Bradford City | 1–0 (H), 3–0 (A) |
| 2000 | Intertoto Cup | Final | (Spain) Celta Vigo | 1–2 (A), 2–2 (H) |
| 2002–03 | UEFA Cup | Qualifying round | (Andorra) Encamp | 5–0 (A), 8–0 (H) |
| 2002–03 | UEFA Cup | First round | (Switzerland) Grasshopper | 1–3 (A), 2–1 (H) |
| 2004–05 | UEFA Cup | Second qualifying round | (Austria) Pasching | 1–3 (A), 2–0 (H) (Note: Won on away goals) |
| 2004–05 | UEFA Cup | First round | (Serbia and Montenegro) Red Star Belgrade | 4–0 (H), 2–1 (A) |
| 2004–05 | UEFA Cup | Group H | (Greece) AEK Athens | 5–1 (H) |
| 2004–05 | UEFA Cup | Group H | (France) Lille | 1–2 (A) |
| 2004–05 | UEFA Cup | Group H | (Spain) Sevilla | 1–1 (H) |
| 2004–05 | UEFA Cup | Group H | (Germany) Alemannia Aachen | 2–2 (A) |
| 2005–06 | UEFA Cup | Second qualifying round | (Austria) Pasching | 2–2 (A), 1–1 (H) |
| 2005–06 | UEFA Cup | First round | (Greece) AEK Athens | 0–0 (H), 1–0 (A) |
| 2005–06 | UEFA Cup | Group H | (Portugal) Vitória Guimarães | 2–1 (H) |
| 2005–06 | UEFA Cup | Group H | (England) Bolton Wanderers | 0–1 (A) |
| 2005–06 | UEFA Cup | Group H | (Spain) Sevilla | 2–1 (H) |
| 2005–06 | UEFA Cup | Group H | (Turkey) Beşiktaş | 1–1 (A) |
| 2005–06 | UEFA Cup | Round of 32 | (Norway) Rosenborg | 2–0 (A), 2–1 (H) |
| 2005–06 | UEFA Cup | Round of 16 | (France) Marseille | 1–0 (A), 1–1 (H) |
| 2005–06 | UEFA Cup | Quarter-final | (Spain) Sevilla | 1–4 (A), 1–1 (H) |
| 2007–08 | UEFA Cup | Second qualifying round | (Slovakia) Zlaté Moravce | 2–0 (A), 3–0 (H) |
| 2007–08 | UEFA Cup | First round | (Belgium) Standard Liège | 3–0 (H), 1–1 (A) |
| 2007–08 | UEFA Cup | Group A | (Netherlands) AZ | 1–1 (H) |
| 2007–08 | UEFA Cup | Group A | (Greece) AEL | 3–2 (A) |
| 2007–08 | UEFA Cup | Group A | (Germany) Nürnberg | 2–2 (H) |
| 2007–08 | UEFA Cup | Group A | (England) Everton | 0–1 (A) |
| 2007–08 | UEFA Cup | Round of 32 | (Spain) Villarreal | 1–0 (H), 1–2 (A) |
| 2007–08 | UEFA Cup | Round of 16 | (France) Marseille | 1–3 (A), 2–0 (H) |
| 2007–08 | UEFA Cup | Quarter-final | (Germany) Bayer Leverkusen | 4–1 (A), 0–1 (H) |
| 2007–08 | UEFA Cup | Semi-final | (Germany) Bayern Munich | 1–1 (A), 4–0 (H) |
| 2007–08 | UEFA Cup | Final | (Scotland) Rangers | 2–0 (N) |
| 2008 | Super Cup | Final | (England) Manchester United | 2–1 (N) |
| 2008–09 | Champions League | Group H | (Italy) Juventus | 0–1 (A), 0–0 (H) |
| 2008–09 | Champions League | Group H | (Spain) Real Madrid | 1–2 (H), 0–3 (A) |
| 2008–09 | Champions League | Group H | (Belarus) BATE Borisov | 1–1 (H), 2–0 (A) |
| 2008–09 | UEFA Cup | Round of 32 | (Germany) Stuttgart | 2–1 (H), 2–1 (A) |
| 2008–09 | UEFA Cup | Round of 16 | (Italy) Udinese | 0–2 (A), 1–0 (H) |
| 2009–10 | Europa League | Play-off round | (Portugal) Nacional | 3–4 (A), 1–1 (H) |
| 2010–11 | Champions League | Third qualifying round | (Romania) Unirea Urziceni | 0–0 (A), 1–0 (H) |
| 2010–11 | Champions League | Play-off round | (France) Auxerre | 1–0 (H), 0–2 (A) |
| 2010–11 | Europa League | Group G | (Belgium) Anderlecht | 3–1 (A), 3–1 (H) |
| 2010–11 | Europa League | Group G | (Greece) AEK Athens | 4–2 (H), 3–0 (A) |
| 2010–11 | Europa League | Group G | (Croatia) Hajduk Split | 2–0 (H), 3–2 (A) |
| 2010–11 | Europa League | Round of 32 | (Switzerland) Young Boys | 1–2 (A), 3–1 (H) |
| 2010–11 | Europa League | Round of 16 | (Netherlands) Twente | 0–3 (A), 2–0 (H) |
| 2011–12 | Champions League | Group G | (Cyprus) APOEL | 1–2 (A), 0–0 (H) |
| 2011–12 | Champions League | Group G | (Portugal) Porto | 3–1 (H), 0–0 (A) |
| 2011–12 | Champions League | Group G | (Ukraine) Shakhtar Donetsk | 2–2 (A), 1–0 (H) |
| 2011–12 | Champions League | Round of 16 | (Portugal) Benfica | 3–2 (H), 0–2 (A) |
| 2012–13 | Champions League | Group G | (Spain) Málaga | 0–3 (A), 2–2 (H) |
| 2012–13 | Champions League | Group G | (Italy) Milan | 2–3 (H), 1–0 (A) |
| 2012–13 | Champions League | Group G | (Belgium) Anderlecht | 1–0 (H), 0–1 (A) |
| 2012–13 | Europa League | Round of 32 | (England) Liverpool | 2–0 (H), 1–3 (A) |
| 2012–13 | Europa League | Round of 16 | (Switzerland) Basel | 0–2 (A), 1–0 (H) |
| 2013–14 | Champions League | Third qualifying round | (Denmark) Nordsjælland | 1–0 (A), 5–0 (H) |
| 2013–14 | Champions League | Play-off round | (Portugal) Paços de Ferreira | 4–1 (A), 4–2 (H) |
| 2013–14 | Champions League | Group G | (Portugal) Porto | 1–0 (A), 1–1 (H) |
| 2013–14 | Champions League | Group G | (Spain) Atlético Madrid | 1–3 (A), 1–1 (H) |
| 2013–14 | Champions League | Group G | Austria Wien | 0–0 (H), 1–4 (A) |
| 2013–14 | Champions League | Round of 16 | (Germany) Borussia Dortmund | 2–4 (H), 2–1 (A) |
| 2014–15 | Champions League | Third qualifying round | (Cyprus) AEL Limassol | 0–1 (A), 3–0 (H) |
| 2014–15 | Champions League | Play-off round | (Belgium) Standard Liège | 1–0 (A), 3–0 (H) |
| 2014–15 | Champions League | Group C | (Portugal) Benfica | 2–0 (A), 1–0 (H) |
| 2014–15 | Champions League | Group C | (France) Monaco | 0–0 (H), 0–2 (A) |
| 2014–15 | Champions League | Group C | (Germany) Bayer Leverkusen | 0–2 (A), 1–2 (H) |
| 2014–15 | Europa League | Round of 32 | (Netherlands) PSV | 1–0 (A), 3–0 (H) |
| 2014–15 | Europa League | Round of 16 | (Italy) Torino | 2–0 (H), 0–1 (A) |
| 2014–15 | Europa League | Quarter-final | (Spain) Sevilla | 1–2 (A), 2–2 (H) |
| 2015–16 | Champions League | Group H | (Spain) Valencia | 3–2 (A), 2–0 (H) |
| 2015–16 | Champions League | Group H | (Belgium) Gent | 2–1 (H), 1–2 (A) |
| 2015–16 | Champions League | Group H | (France) Lyon | 3–1 (H), 2–0 (A) |
| 2015–16 | Champions League | Round of 16 | (Portugal) Benfica | 0–1 (A), 1–2 (H) |
| 2016–17 | Europa League | Group D | (Netherlands) AZ | 5–0 (H), 2–3 (A) |
| 2016–17 | Europa League | Group D | (Israel) Maccabi Tel Aviv | 4–3 (A), 2–0 (H) |
| 2016–17 | Europa League | Group D | (Republic of Ireland) Dundalk | 2–1 (A), 2–1 (H) |
| 2016–17 | Europa League | Round of 32 | (Belgium) Anderlecht | 0–2 (A), 3–1 (H) |
| 2017–18 | Europa League | Third Qualifying Round | (Israel) Bnei Yehuda Tel Aviv F.C. | 0–1 (H), 2–0 (A) |
| 2017–18 | Europa League | Play-off Round | (Netherlands) FC Utrecht | 2–0 (H), 0–1 (A) |
| 2017–18 | Europa League | Group D | (Spain) Real Sociedad | 3–1 (A), 3–1 (H) |
| 2017–18 | Europa League | Group D | (Norway) Rosenborg BK | 3–1 (H), 1–1 (A) |
| 2017–18 | Europa League | Group D | (North Macedonia) FK Vardar | 5–0 (A), 2–1 (H) |
| 2017–18 | Europa League | Round of 32 | (Scotland) Celtic | 0–1 (A), 3–0 (H) |
| 2017–18 | Europa League | Round of 16 | (Germany) RB Leipzig | 1–2 (A), 1–1 (H) |
| 2018–19 | Europa League | Third Qualifying Round | (Belarus) Dinamo Minsk | 0−4 (A), 8−1 (a.e.t.) (H) |
| 2018–19 | Europa League | Play-off Round | (Norway) Molde | 3−1 (H), 1−2 (A) |
| 2018–19 | Europa League | Group C | (Denmark) Copenhagen | 1−1 (A), 1−0 (H) |
| 2018–19 | Europa League | Group C | (Czech Republic) Slavia Prague | 1−0 (H), 0−2 (A) |
| 2018–19 | Europa League | Group C | (France) Bordeaux | 2−1 (H), 1−1 (A) |
| 2018–19 | Europa League | Round of 32 | (Turkey) Fenerbahçe | 0−1 (A), 3−1 (H) |
| 2018–19 | Europa League | Round of 16 | (Spain) Villarreal | 1−3 (H), 1−2 (A) |
| 2019–20 | Champions League | Group G | (Portugal) Benfica | 3−1 (H), 0−3 (A) |
| 2019–20 | Champions League | Group G | (France) Lyon | 1−1 (A), 2−0 (H) |
| 2019–20 | Champions League | Group G | (Germany) RB Leipzig | 1−2 (A), 0−2 (H) |
| 2020–21 | Champions League | Group F | (Belgium) Club Brugge | 1−2 (H), 0–3 (A) |
| 2020–21 | Champions League | Group F | (Italy) Lazio | 1−1 (H), 1–3 (A) |
| 2020–21 | Champions League | Group F | (Germany) Borussia Dortmund | 0−2 (A), 1–2 (H) |
| 2021–22 | Champions League | Group H | (England) Chelsea | 0−1 (A), 3–3 (H) |
| 2021–22 | Champions League | Group H | (Sweden) Malmö FF | 4−0 (H), 1–1 (A) |
| 2021–22 | Champions League | Group H | (Italy) Juventus | 0−1 (H), 2–4 (A) |
| 2021–22 | Europa League | Knockout round play-offs | (Spain) Real Betis | 2–3 (H) 0–0 (A) |

== Overall record ==
As of 24 February 2022

=== By competition ===
| Competition | Pld | W | D | L | GF | GA | GD | Win% (Note: Win% is rounded to two decimal places) |
|---|---|---|---|---|---|---|---|---|
| Champions League / European Cup | 76 | 30 | 15 | 31 | 98 | 96 | +2 | 39.47 |
| Europa League / UEFA Cup / Inter-Cities Fairs Cup | 118 | 60 | 21 | 37 | 208 | 143 | +65 | 50.85 |
| Super Cup | 1 | 1 | 0 | 0 | 2 | 1 | +1 | 100.00 |
| Intertoto Cup | 8 | 6 | 1 | 1 | 17 | 7 | +10 | 75.00 |
| Total | 203 | 97 | 37 | 69 | 326 | 246 | +80 | 47.78 |

=== By country ===
| Country | Pld | W | D | L | GF | GA | GD | Win% | Ref |
|---|---|---|---|---|---|---|---|---|---|
| Andorra | 2 | 2 | 0 | 0 | 13 | 0 | +13 | 100.00 | |
| Austria | 6 | 1 | 3 | 2 | 7 | 10 | −3 | 16.67 | |
| Belarus | 4 | 2 | 1 | 1 | 11 | 6 | +5 | 50.00 | |
| Belgium | 16 | 9 | 1 | 6 | 24 | 20 | +4 | 56.25 | |
| Croatia | 2 | 2 | 0 | 0 | 5 | 2 | +3 | 100.00 | |
| Cyprus | 4 | 1 | 1 | 2 | 4 | 3 | +1 | 25.00 | |
| Czech Republic | 2 | 1 | 0 | 1 | 1 | 2 | −1 | 50.00 | |
| Denmark | 6 | 4 | 2 | 0 | 11 | 2 | +9 | 66.67 | |
| East Germany | 2 | 0 | 0 | 2 | 2 | 6 | −4 | 0.00 | |
| England | 9 | 4 | 1 | 4 | 12 | 10 | +2 | 44.44 | |
| Finland | 2 | 1 | 0 | 1 | 3 | 4 | −1 | 50.00 | |
| France | 15 | 7 | 4 | 4 | 18 | 14 | +4 | 46.67 | |
| Germany / West Germany | 16 | 4 | 4 | 8 | 21 | 26 | −5 | 25.00 | |
| Greece | 6 | 5 | 1 | 0 | 16 | 5 | +11 | 83.33 | |
| Hungary | 2 | 2 | 0 | 0 | 4 | 2 | +2 | 100.00 | |
| Ireland | 2 | 2 | 0 | 0 | 4 | 2 | +2 | 100.00 | |
| Israel | 4 | 3 | 0 | 1 | 8 | 4 | +4 | 75.00 | |
| Italy | 14 | 3 | 3 | 8 | 12 | 21 | −9 | 21.43 | |
| Macedonia | 2 | 2 | 0 | 0 | 7 | 1 | +6 | 100.00 | |
| Netherlands | 10 | 5 | 1 | 4 | 16 | 9 | +7 | 50.00 | |
| Norway | 6 | 5 | 0 | 1 | 12 | 4 | +8 | 83.33 | |
| Portugal | 17 | 9 | 3 | 5 | 29 | 22 | +7 | 52.94 | |
| Romania | 2 | 1 | 1 | 0 | 1 | 0 | +1 | 50.00 | |
| Scotland | 2 | 1 | 0 | 1 | 2 | 1 | +1 | 50.00 | |
| Serbia | 2 | 2 | 0 | 0 | 6 | 1 | +5 | 100.00 | |
| Slovakia | 2 | 2 | 0 | 0 | 5 | 0 | +5 | 100.00 | |
| Slovenia | 2 | 2 | 0 | 0 | 6 | 1 | +5 | 100.00 | |
| Spain | 23 | 5 | 7 | 11 | 30 | 42 | −12 | 21.74 | |
| Sweden | 2 | 1 | 1 | 0 | 5 | 1 | +4 | 50.00 | |
| Switzerland | 6 | 3 | 0 | 3 | 8 | 9 | −1 | 50.00 | |
| Turkey | 3 | 1 | 1 | 1 | 4 | 3 | +1 | 33.33 | |
| Ukraine | 2 | 1 | 1 | 0 | 3 | 2 | +1 | 50.00 | |

== UEFA Coefficient Rankings ==
=== UEFA club coefficient ranking ===
As of 12 August 2026

| Rank | Team | Points |
|---|---|---|
| 207 | (Luxembourg) F91 Dudelange | 8.000 |
| 208 | (Kazakhstan) Tobol | 8.000 |
| 209 | (Russia) Zenit St. Petersburg | 8.000 |
| 210 | (Republic of Ireland) St Patrick's | 7.500 |
| 211 | (Moldova) Milsami Orhei | 7.500 |

=== UEFA Rankings since 2004 ===
As of 12 August 2026

| Season | Ranking | Movement | Points | Change |
|---|---|---|---|---|
| 2025–26 | 209 | ▼ -83 | 8.000 | ▼ -5.000 |
| 2024–25 | 126 | ▼ -47 | 13.000 | ▼ -9.000 |
| 2023–24 | 79 | ▼ -25 | 22.000 | ▼ -10.000 |
| 2022–23 | 54 | ▼ -17 | 32.000 | ▼ -14.000 |
| 2021–22 | 37 | ▼ -9 | 46.000 | ▼ -4.000 |
| 2020–21 | 28 | ▼ -6 | 50.000 | ▼ -14.000 |
| 2019–20 | 22 | ▼ -3 | 64.000 | ▼ -8.000 |
| 2018–19 | 19 | ▼ -3 | 72.000 | ▼ -6.000 |
| 2017–18 | 16 | ▲ +3 | 78.000 | ▲ +1.000 |
| 2016–17 | 19 | ▼ -4 | 77.000 | ▼ -6.000 |
| 2015–16 | 15 | 0 | 83.000 | ▲ +3.000 |
| 2014–15 | 15 | ▲ +6 | 80.000 | ▲ +15.500 |
| 2013–14 | 21 | 0 | 64.500 | ▲ +3.000 |
| 2012–13 | 21 | ▼ -1 | 61.500 | ▼ +-8.000 |
| 2011–12 | 20 | ▲ +11 | 69.500 | ▲ +18.000 |
| 2010–11 | 31 | ▼ -5 | 51.500 | ▼ -0.500 |
| 2009–10 | 26 | ▼ -8 | 52.000 | ▼ -7.000 |
| 2008–09 | 18 | ▲ +9 | 59.000 | ▲ +13.000 |
| 2007–08 | 27 | ▲ +33 | 46.000 | ▲ +19.000 |
| 2006–07 | 60 | 0 | 27.000 | 0.000 |
| 2005–06 | 60 | ▲ +64 | 27.000 | ▲ +17.000 |
| 2004–05 | 124 | 0 | 10.000 | 0.000 |

=== Football Club Elo ranking ===
As of 12 August 2026

| Rank | Team | Points |
|---|---|---|
| 35 | (Spain) Villarreal | 1790 |
| 36 | (England) Fulham | 1789 |
| 37 | (Russia) Zenit St. Petersburg | 1787 |
| 38 | (Belgium) Club Brugge | 1787 |
| 39 | (Turkey) Galatasaray | 1786 |
