= Yevgeny Ivanenko =

Belarusian footballer

Personal information
- Full name: Yevgeny Vladimirovich Ivanenko
- Date of birth: 22 December 1995 (age 30)
- Place of birth: Mozyr, Gomel Oblast, Belarus
- Height: 1.84 m (6 ft 0 in)
- Position: Goalkeeper

Youth career
- 2012–2013: Slavia Mozyr

Senior career*
Years	Team	Apps	(Gls)
2014–2024	Slavia Mozyr	14	(0)
2015	→ Khimik Svetlogorsk (loan)	19	(0)
2018	→ Granit Mikashevichi (loan)	1	(0)
2020–2021	→ Gomel (loan)	21	(0)
- * Club domestic league appearances and goals as of 5 December 2024

Yevgeny Vladimirovich Ivanenko (Belarusian: Яўген Уладзіміравіч Іваненка; Russian: Евгений Владимирович Иваненко; born 22 December 1995) is a Belarusian professional footballer.

== Honours ==
Gomel

- Belarusian Cup winner: 2021–22
