= Valeria Ivanenko =

- Born: Valeria Volodymyrivna Ivanenko; April 28, 1966 (age 60); USSR, Magadan Oblast, Ust' Khakchan

Valeria Volodymyrivna Ivanenko (Ukrainian: Валерія Володимирівна Іваненко) is the "Slavonic Channel International" Director General.

== Early life and education ==
Born in Ust' Khakchan, Magadanskaya Oblast', Russia. In 1990 graduated from Leningrad Institute of Theatre, Music and Cinema. Majored in television direction.

== Employment ==
1988 - 1991 – author of the concept and the developer of the broadcasting of the first non-governmental television company on the territory of USSR – TONIS (Mykolaiv, Ukrainian Soviet Socialist Republic).

1991 – 1995 – one of the founders and Director General of the first non-governmental television channel in Kyiv. TONIS's central office had been moved from Nikolaev to the capital of Ukraine, and the company obtained the name of "Tet-a-Tet" (TONIS-Enter-Television).

1994 – 1995 – concept formulation of the Slavonic Channel International project and the organization of experimental broadcasting from an Eutelsat satellite.

«It was a breakthrough in satellite broadcasting on the former USSR's territory. The broadcasting covered the territory with the total population of 550 millions people» (I. Mashenko, «Television de facto»).

1995 – 2003 – Producer General of TONIS; arrangement of the channel's broadcasting.

1997 - 1998 – Producer General of the telecompany "Lybid" (founded by the National Space Agency of Ukraine); head of the project on exclusive media coverage of the first spaceflight mission involving an astronaut from independent Ukraine – Leonid Kadenyuk.

Administrative and creative work at Johnson Space Center and Kennedy Space Center.

1998 - professional training at NBC and CNN.

November 19, 1998 – arranging and conducting the live television broadcast of the STS-87 launch. It was the first live broadcast in the history of one of the leading Ukrainian television channels (Inter).

1993 - 1995 – author of the concept and creative leader of the international festival of television programs "Barkhatny Sezon" (The Velvet Season).

1995 - 2003 – President of the "Barkhatny Sezon".

2003 - Vice-president of the "Garant Media International" agency.

2005 – author of the renewed concept of the Slavonic Channel International broadcasting. Since 2006 – Director General of the Slavonic Channel International.

Since September 12, 2008 Slavonic Channel International performs twenty-four-hour broadcasting on the territory of Europe.

== Awards/Prizes ==
- 1988 - second prize of the television programs festival for young people in Uzhgorod, Ukraine for the film “Vstrechi” (Meetings) – screenwriter and director.
- 1990 - second prize of the international television festival “Ekran” in Budapest, Hungary for the film “Chto nam stoit dom postroit?” (What's it worth to build a house?) – screenwriter.
- 1991 - first prize of the international festival in Varna, Bulgaria for the film “Na poroge moei zemli” (On the edge of my land) - screenwriter and director.
- 2000 - the award of Ukraine's National Union of Journalists, Zolotoie Pero (Golden Quill).
- 2001 - membership in the Eurasian Television Academy.
- 2001 - the award of Ukraine's National Union of Journalists, Zolotoie Pero.
- 2002 - membership in the International Academy of Television and Radio Broadcasting.
- 2002 - the Prometheus Prestige award of the program «Person of the Year» in the nomination “Cultural project of the year” for the project "Barkhatny Sezon".
- 2003 - laureate of the “Saint Sophia” honorary award (within the international program “Leaders of the 21st century") for the personal contribution in the revival of spirituality, national science and culture.
