= 2008 UEFA Super Cup =

- Match programme cover
| Manchester United | Zenit Saint Petersburg |
| (England) | (Russia) |
| 1 | 2 |
- Date: 29 August 2008
- Venue: Stade Louis II, Monaco
- Man of the Match: Danny (Zenit Saint Petersburg)
- Referee: Claus Bo Larsen (Denmark)
- Attendance: 18,064
- Weather: Sunny; 25 °C (77 °F); 78% humidity

The 2008 UEFA Super Cup was the 33rd UEFA Super Cup, a football match played between the winners of the previous season's UEFA Champions League and UEFA Cup competitions. The 2008 competition was contested by Manchester United of England, who won the 2007–08 UEFA Champions League, and Zenit Saint Petersburg of Russia, the winners of the 2007–08 UEFA Cup. The match was played on 29 August 2008 at the Stade Louis II in Monaco.

Zenit won the match 2–1, Pavel Pogrebnyak scoring just before half-time, before Danny doubled the Russians' lead just before the hour mark. Nemanja Vidić reduced the deficit to one goal in the 73rd minute, but it was not enough to wrest the trophy from Zenit's grasp, as they became the first Russian team to win the competition. The sending-off of Paul Scholes for handball in the 90th minute resulted in him missing Manchester United's opening game in their defence of the Champions League, a home tie against Villarreal.

This was Zenit's first appearance in the competition, while Manchester United had appeared twice before, in 1991 and 1999; their first appearance finished in a 1–0 win over Red Star Belgrade, while their most recent appearance was a 1–0 loss to Lazio, the last winners of the UEFA Cup Winners' Cup to compete in the UEFA Super Cup.

== Match ==
=== Summary ===
==== First half ====
The opening exchanges of the match were dominated by Zenit, counter-attacking down their right flank, exploiting the attack-minded Patrice Evra. Both Konstantin Zyryanov and Aleksandr Anyukov created opportunities on the right wing, only for Pavel Pogrebnyak to miss the target from a promising position on both occasions. Danny also managed to break into the box from the right-hand by-line, only for Rio Ferdinand to block his low cross.

Up at the other end, United had a couple of half-chances of their own as, first, Carlos Tevez hit a weak shot into Vyacheslav Malafeev's arms before sprinting after a ball played up the right wing, just managing to keep it in, before breaking through one tackle into the box and squaring the ball to Wayne Rooney. However, the England striker's first touch was poor, and the delay meant that the chance had passed.

Zenit's pressure began to mount and, with half-time approaching, they won a corner on the left-hand side. Alejandro Domínguez took an in-swinging corner. Igor Denisov flicked the ball on at the near post, and it floated over Edwin van der Sar for Pavel Pogrebnyak to head in on the line. Paul Scholes picked up a yellow card shortly after the game had restarted, but the half-time whistle soon followed and Zenit went in on top.

==== Second half ====
Andrey Arshavin, a target for Barcelona and Tottenham Hotspur over the summer, came on as a substitute for Alejandro Domínguez at half-time, but it was Danny who made the breakthrough for the second goal on the hour mark. Picking up the ball just inside the United half, the United defence continued to back off from him and he broke into the box, firing a shot past Edwin van der Sar, who dived the wrong way.

A Carlos Tevez effort came close to pulling a goal back for Manchester United, and sparked a period of sustained pressure for the European champions. As United began to get into full swing, the Zenit side struggled to cope and, after Tevez had been found in space in the box by Wayne Rooney, he pulled the ball back to Nemanja Vidić who stabbed the ball into the net from six yards out. John O'Shea, Park Ji-sung and Wayne Rooney all went close as the clock ran down, but it was Danny who went closest to getting another goal for Zenit, shooting over the bar with just Van der Sar to beat after picking up a through ball from Andrey Arshavin.

With only a minute of normal time remaining, Wes Brown sent over a cross from the right wing. Paul Scholes rose to meet the ball, but, instead of heading the ball, he stuck out his right arm and punched the ball into the goal. The referee had no hesitation in showing Scholes a second yellow card and sending him off. The red card meant that Scholes would miss Manchester United's first Champions League game of the 2008–09 season, at home to Villarreal.

=== Details ===
29 August 2008
20:45 CEST

| Manchester United (England) | 1–2 | (Russia) Zenit Saint Petersburg |
|---|---|---|
| Vidić 73' | Report | Pogrebnyak 44'; Danny 59' |

Stade Louis II, Monaco
Attendance: 18,064
Referee: Claus Bo Larsen (Denmark)

| Manchester United | Zenit Saint Petersburg |

| GK | 1 | (Netherlands) Edwin van der Sar |
| RB | 2 | (England) Gary Neville (c) | | (substituted off) 76' |
| CB | 5 | (England) Rio Ferdinand |
| CB | 15 | (Serbia) Nemanja Vidić |
| LB | 3 | (France) Patrice Evra |
| RM | 24 | (Scotland) Darren Fletcher | | (substituted off) 60' |
| CM | 18 | (England) Paul Scholes | (yellow card) 45+1' (yellow-red card) 90' |
| CM | 8 | (Brazil) Anderson | (yellow card) 54' | (substituted off) 60' |
| LM | 17 | (Portugal) Nani |
| CF | 10 | (England) Wayne Rooney |
| CF | 32 | (Argentina) Carlos Tevez | (yellow card) 74' |
Substitutes:
| GK | 29 | (Poland) Tomasz Kuszczak |
| DF | 6 | (England) Wes Brown | | (substituted on) 76' |
| DF | 22 | (Republic of Ireland) John O'Shea | | (substituted on) 60' |
| MF | 13 | (South Korea) Park Ji-sung | | (substituted on) 60' |
| MF | 28 | (Republic of Ireland) Darron Gibson |
| MF | 34 | (Brazil) Rodrigo Possebon |
| FW | 31 | (England) Fraizer Campbell |
Manager:
(Scotland) Sir Alex Ferguson

| GK | 16 | (Russia) Vyacheslav Malafeev |
| RB | 22 | (Russia) Aleksandr Anyukov |
| CB | 4 | (Croatia) Ivica Križanac | (substituted off) 71' |
| CB | 28 | (France) Sébastien Puygrenier | (substituted off) 62' |
| LB | 11 | (Czech Republic) Radek Šírl |
| DM | 44 | (Ukraine) Anatoliy Tymoshchuk (c) |
| RM | 18 | (Russia) Konstantin Zyryanov |
| LM | 27 | (Russia) Igor Denisov |
| AM | 19 | (Portugal) Danny |
| CF | 7 | (Argentina) Alejandro Domínguez | (substituted off) 46' |
| CF | 8 | (Russia) Pavel Pogrebnyak |
Substitutes:
| GK | 1 | (Slovakia) Kamil Čontofalský |
| DF | 5 | (South Korea) Kim Dong-jin |
| DF | 15 | (Russia) Roman Shirokov | (substituted on) 62' |
| MF | 2 | (Russia) Vladislav Radimov | (substituted on) 71' |
| MF | 10 | (Russia) Andrey Arshavin | (substituted on) 46' |
| MF | 20 | (Russia) Viktor Fayzulin |
| FW | 9 | (Turkey) Fatih Tekke |
Manager:
(Netherlands) Dick Advocaat

Man of the Match:
Danny (Zenit Saint Petersburg)

Assistant referees:
Henrik Sonderby (Denmark)
Anders Norrestrand (Denmark)
Fourth official:
Nicolai Vollquartz (Denmark)

Match rules

- 90 minutes.
- 30 minutes of extra time if necessary.
- Penalty shoot-out if scores still level.
- Seven named substitutes.
- Maximum of three substitutions.

=== Statistics ===
First half
| Statistic | Manchester United | Zenit Saint Petersburg |
|---|---|---|
| Goals scored | 0 | 1 |
| Total shots | 4 | 5 |
| Shots on target | 2 | 2 |
| Saves | 1 | 2 |
| Ball possession | 42% | 58% |
| Corner kicks | 2 | 3 |
| Fouls committed | 10 | 7 |
| Offsides | 1 | 0 |
| Yellow cards | 1 | 0 |
| Red cards | 0 | 0 |

Second half
| Statistic | Manchester United | Zenit Saint Petersburg |
|---|---|---|
| Goals scored | 1 | 1 |
| Total shots | 9 | 4 |
| Shots on target | 4 | 3 |
| Saves | 2 | 3 |
| Ball possession | 50% | 50% |
| Corner kicks | 4 | 0 |
| Fouls committed | 6 | 5 |
| Offsides | 1 | 1 |
| Yellow cards | 3 | 0 |
| Red cards | 1 | 0 |

Overall
| Statistic | Manchester United | Zenit Saint Petersburg |
|---|---|---|
| Goals scored | 1 | 2 |
| Total shots | 13 | 9 |
| Shots on target | 6 | 5 |
| Saves | 3 | 5 |
| Ball possession | 46% | 54% |
| Corner kicks | 6 | 3 |
| Fouls committed | 16 | 12 |
| Offsides | 2 | 1 |
| Yellow cards | 4 | 0 |
| Red cards | 1 | 0 |

== Sponsorship ==
Danish brewers Carlsberg were the main sponsors of the event, and the Man of the Match award was officially called "Carlsberg Man of the Match".

== See also ==
- 2008–09 UEFA Champions League
- 2008–09 UEFA Cup
- 2008–09 Manchester United F.C. season
- 2008 FC Zenit Saint Petersburg season
- FC Zenit Saint Petersburg in European football
- Manchester United F.C. in international football
