= Viktor Ivanenko =

Ukrainian pistol shooter and coach

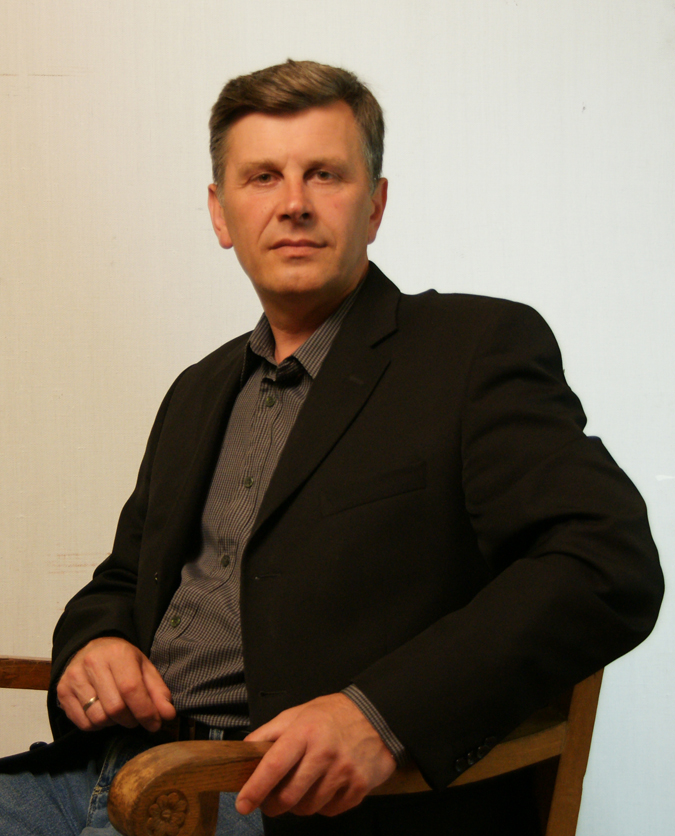
- Ivanenko in 2010

Personal information
- Born: 24 June 1961 (age 65) Lviv, Ukraine

Sport
- Sport: Pistol shooting
- Coached by: Viktor Sikorskiy; Mikhail Golubov

Viktor Evgenievich Ivanenko (Ukrainian: Віктор Євгенович Іваненко; born 24 June 1961) is a retired Ukrainian pistol shooter and coach.

== Biography ==
Ivanenko was born in Lviv, Ukraine. His father, Evgeny Zavgorodnyuk, was a soldier and did not live with the family. In 1974, Ivanenko was admitted into the Higher Lviv Sports Boarding School, where he trained in the pistol shooting department under Viktor Sikorsky. In 1975 he moved to the group of Mikhail Golubov. In 1978, he entered the Higher Lviv Military-Political School. In 1981, he won the European junior title in the 25 m rapid fire pistol event, with a score of 598 out of 600. Next year, he won one gold, two silver, and two bronze medals at the World Cup in Benito Juarez, Mexico; he also won one gold, three silver and three bronze medals at the 1983 World Cup. In 1995, he won a bronze medal title at the Military World Games in Rome, Italy.

Ivanenko retired from active competitions in the late 1990s, and in 1999–2008 trained the Ukrainian national pistol team. His trainees include Oleh Tkachov.

== Personal life ==
Ivanenko is married to Elena Arnoldovna Troshchenkova (born 1958). They have a daughter, Nadya (born 1980)
