= Vladislav Radimov =

Russian footballer

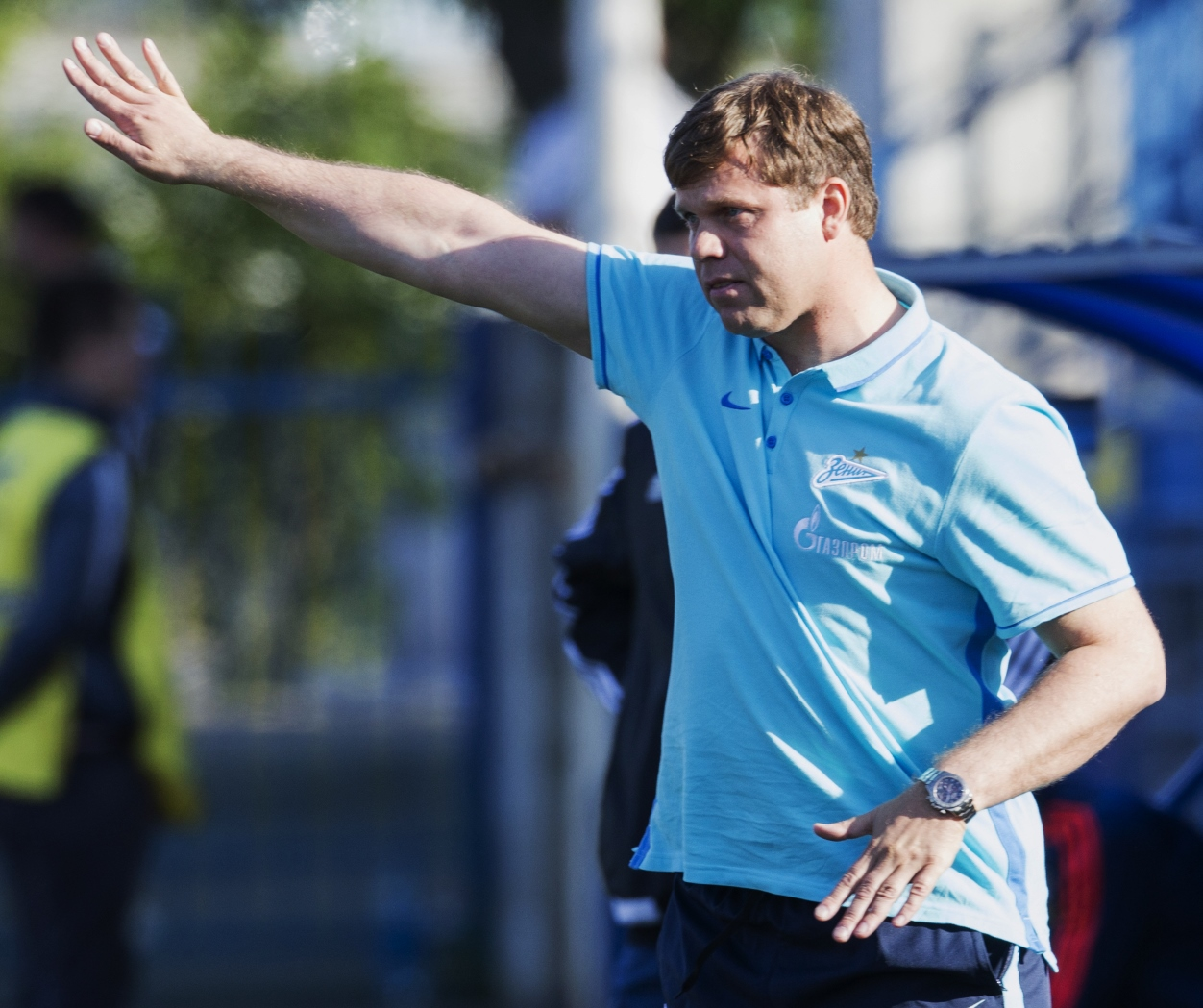
- Radimov coaching Zenit-2 in 2015

Personal information
- Full name: Vladislav Nikolayevich Radimov
- Date of birth: 26 November 1975 (age 50)
- Place of birth: Leningrad, Russian SFSR, Soviet Union
- Height: 1.82 m (6 ft 0 in)
- Position: Midfielder

Senior career*
Years	Team	Apps	(Gls)
1992	Smena-Saturn Saint Petersburg	1	(0)
1992–1993	CSKA-2 Moscow	34	(4)
1992–1996	CSKA Moscow	70	(14)
1996–2001	Zaragoza	63	(5)
1999	→ Dynamo Moscow (loan)	22	(2)
2001	Levski Sofia	3	(1)
2001–2002	Krylia Sovetov Samara	42	(3)
2003–2008	Zenit St. Petersburg	110	(9)
Total		345	(38)

International career
1994–1995	Russia U21	7	(2)
1995	Russia U20	4	(0)
1994–2006	Russia	33	(3)

Managerial career
- 2011–2013: Zenit U21 (assistant)
- 2013–2017: Zenit-2 St. Petersburg
- 2014: Zenit St. Petersburg (assistant)
- 2018–2022: Zenit-2 St. Petersburg
- * Club domestic league appearances and goals

Vladislav Nikolayevich Radimov (Russian: Владисла́в Никола́евич Ради́мов, IPA: [vlədʲɪˈslaf nʲɪkɐˈlajɪvʲɪtɕ rɐˈdʲiməf]; born 26 November 1975) is a Russian football coach and a former player who played midfielder. He was previously the captain of FC Zenit Saint Petersburg and is a former Russian international player. He was a right-sided midfielder or playmaker. At Zenit Saint Petersburg he often played a free playing holding midfielder (like a deep lying playmaker) or a central midfielder.

== Playing career ==
As a child, Radimov attended fencing school, but at the age of 9 left it for the Smena football school. He did not receive much attention from the Saint Petersburg clubs, and in 1992 he appeared in only one match for the Second Division team Smena-Saturn. In June 1992 he moved to Moscow to play for the reserve team of CSKA Moscow. Radimov debuted for the first team of CSKA on 30 July 1992 when a number of players did not fly to an away match against Okean Nakhodka.

In 1994 Radimov became a first-team regular for CSKA, and was first capped for the national team in a friendly against Austria. In 1994, he was named the best new player of the league by Football Review, and in 1995 he received the Strelets prize as "the hope of the season".

In 1996 Radimov played in all three Russia's matches at Euro 96, and transferred to Real Zaragoza after the finals. He spent two and a half seasons there. By the end of 1998 Radimov had a little playing time at Zaragoza and was loaned to Dynamo Moscow. Contrary to the expectations, his 1999 season in Russia was not successful. After the end of loan he returned to Zaragoza. In 2000, he transferred to Levski Sofia, but had a little playing time with them and was eventually released from the team, following a disciplinary breach.

In 2001, Radimov returned to Russia again to play for Krylia Sovetov Samara. He became the captain of the team soon. After two years in Samara, he moved to his home city to play for Zenit Saint Petersburg. He was elected the team captain immediately.

== Personal life ==
In 2005–2016, Radimov was married to the popular singer Tatiana Bulanova.

== Career statistics ==
Appearances and goals by club, season and competition
Club	Season	League		
Club	Season	Division	Apps	Goals
Smena-Saturn	1992	Russian First League	1	0
CSKA	1992	Russian Top League	1	0
CSKA	1993	Russian Top League	3	1
CSKA	1994	Russian Top League	27	4
CSKA	1995	Russian Top League	27	5
CSKA	1996	Russian Top League	12	4
CSKA	Total		70	14
Zaragoza	1996–97	La Liga	25	2
Zaragoza	1997–98	La Liga	24	2
Zaragoza	1998–99	La Liga	4	0
Zaragoza	1999–2000	La Liga	10	1
Zaragoza	2000–01	La Liga	0	0
Zaragoza	Total		63	5
Dynamo Moscow (loan)	1999	Russian Top League	22	2
Levski Sofia	2000–01	A PFG	3	1
Krylia Sovetov	2001	Russian Premier League	13	1
Krylia Sovetov	2002	Russian Premier League	29	2
Krylia Sovetov	Total		42	3
Zenit Saint Petersburg	2003	Russian Premier League	21	3
Zenit Saint Petersburg	2004	Russian Premier League	19	3
Zenit Saint Petersburg	2005	Russian Premier League	24	2
Zenit Saint Petersburg	2006	Russian Premier League	27	0
Zenit Saint Petersburg	2007	Russian Premier League	16	1
Zenit Saint Petersburg	2008	Russian Premier League	3	0
Zenit Saint Petersburg	Total		110	9
Career total			311	34

== International goals ==
Scores and results list Russia's goal tally first.

No	Date	Venue	Opponent	Score	Result	Competition
1.	28 August 1996	Dynamo Stadium, Moscow, Russia	Brazil	2–1	2–2	Friendly match
2.	8 June 1997	Dynamo Stadium, Moscow, Russia	Israel	1–0	2–0	1998 World Cup qualifier
3.	28 April 2004	Ullevaal Stadion, Oslo, Norway	Norway	1–3	2–3	Friendly match

== Honours ==
CSKA Moscow

- Russian Cup: runner-up 1993–94

Dynamo Moscow

- Russian Cup: runner-up 1998–99

Zaragoza

- Copa del Rey: 2000–01

Levski Sofia

- Bulgarian A Professional Football Group: 2000–01

Zenit Saint Petersburg

- Russian Premier League: 2007; runner-up 2003
- Russian Premier League Cup: 2003
- Russian Super Cup: 2008
- UEFA Cup: 2007–08
- UEFA Super Cup: 2008
