= 2006 FC Zenit Saint Petersburg season =

FC Zenit Saint Petersburg
2006 season
- Manager: Vlastimil Petržela (Until May); Vladimír Borovička (Caretaker) (May–July); Dick Advocaat (From 26 June 2006)
- Stadium: Petrovsky Stadium
- Premier League: 4th
- 2005–06 Russian Cup: Semi-finals vs CSKA Moscow
- 2006–07 Russian Cup: Progressed to 2007 season
- UEFA Cup: Quarter-finals vs Sevilla
- Top goalscorer: League: Andrey Arshavin (7); All: Aleksandr Kerzhakov (14)

The 2006 Zenit St.Petersburg season was the club's twelfth season in the Russian Premier League, the highest tier of association football in Russia.

== Season events ==
On 26 June, Dick Advocaat was appointed as Zenit's new manager.

== Squad ==
As of match played 26 November 2006

| No. | Name | Nationality | Position | Date of birth (age) | Signed from | Signed in | Contract ends | Apps. | Goals |
Goalkeepers
| 1 | Kamil Čontofalský | (Slovakia) | GK | 3 June 1978 (aged 28) | Bohemians 1905 | 2003 | | 52 | 0 |
| 16 | Vyacheslav Malafeev | (Russia) | GK | 4 March 1979 (aged 27) | Youth Team | 1999 | | 203 | 0 |
| 41 | Mikhail Kerzhakov | (Russia) | GK | 28 January 1987 (aged 19) | Youth Team | 2005 | | 0 | 0 |
| 51 | Ruslan Mukhamedzyanov | (Russia) | GK | 12 January 1987 (aged 19) | Youth Team | 2006 | | 0 | 0 |
Defenders
| 3 | Martin Škrtel | (Slovakia) | DF | 15 December 1984 (aged 21) | Trenčín | 2004 | | 79 | 4 |
| 4 | Ivica Križanac | (Croatia) | DF | 13 April 1979 (aged 27) | Dyskobolia Grodzisk Wielkopolski | 2005 | | 41 | 2 |
| 8 | Pavel Mareš | (Czech Republic) | DF | 18 January 1976 (aged 30) | Sparta Prague | 2003 | | 125 | 11 |
| 14 | Erik Hagen | (Norway) | DF | 20 July 1975 (aged 31) | Vålerenga | 2005 | | 75 | 3 |
| 15 | Kim Dong-jin | (South Korea) | DF | 29 January 1982 (aged 24) | Anyang LG Cheetahs | 2006 | | 17 | 0 |
| 18 | Aleksandr Korotkov | (Russia) | DF | 13 January 1987 (aged 19) | Youth Team | 2004 | | 0 | 0 |
| 22 | Aleksandr Anyukov | (Russia) | DF | 28 September 1982 (aged 24) | Krylia Sovetov | 2005 | | 58 | 2 |
| 25 | Fernando Ricksen | (Netherlands) | DF | 27 July 1976 (aged 30) | loan from Rangers | 2006 | 2006 | 15 | 2 |
| 26 | Viktor Stroyev | (Russia) | DF | 16 January 1987 (aged 19) | Youth Team | 2004 | | 0 | 0 |
| 29 | Sergey Grigoryev | (Russia) | DF | 14 June 1986 (aged 20) | Youth Team | 2005 | | 0 | 0 |
| 38 | Andrei Nagumanov | (Russia) | DF | 21 February 1987 (aged 19) | Youth Team | 2006 | | 1 | 0 |
| 29 | Boris Rotenberg | (Russia) | DF | 19 May 1986 (aged 20) | Klubi 04 | 2006 | | 0 | 0 |
| 75 | Yuri Lebedev | (Russia) | DF | 21 January 1987 (aged 19) | Youth Team | 2006 | | | |
Midfielders
| 2 | Vladislav Radimov | (Russia) | MF | 26 November 1975 (aged 31) | Krylia Sovetov | 2003 | | 123 | 11 |
| 6 | Oleksandr Spivak | (Ukraine) | MF | 6 January 1975 (aged 31) | Metalurh Zaporizhya | 2000 | | | |
| 9 | Radek Šírl | (Czech Republic) | MF | 20 March 1981 (aged 25) | Sparta Prague | 2003 | | 89 | 5 |
| 10 | Andrey Arshavin | (Russia) | MF | 29 May 1981 (aged 25) | Youth Team | 1999 | | 226 | 50 |
| 13 | Hyun Young-min | (South Korea) | MF | 25 December 1979 (aged 26) | Ulsan Hyundai Horang-i | 2006 | | 17 | 1 |
| 17 | Lee Ho | (South Korea) | MF | 22 October 1984 (aged 22) | Ulsan Hyundai Horang-i | 2006 | | 18 | 1 |
| 24 | Aleksandr Burakov | (Russia) | MF | 27 August 1987 (aged 19) | Youth Team | 2004 | | 2 | 0 |
| 27 | Igor Denisov | (Russia) | MF | 17 May 1984 (aged 22) | Youth Team | 2002 | | 116 | 20 |
| 33 | Mikhail Kozlov | (Russia) | MF | 2 November 1986 (aged 20) | Youth Team | 2005 | | 5 | 0 |
| 37 | German Pyatnikov | (Russia) | MF | 23 January 1988 (aged 18) | Youth Team | 2006 | | 0 | 0 |
| 44 | Alan Kasaev | (Russia) | MF | 8 April 1986 (aged 20) | Shinnik Yaroslavl | 2005 | | 3 | 0 |
| 50 | Sergey Mironov | (Russia) | MF | 13 March 1988 (aged 18) | Youth Team | 2006 | | 0 | 0 |
| 77 | Oleg Samsonov | (Russia) | MF | 7 September 1987 (aged 19) | Youth Team | 2006 | | 0 | 0 |
| 87 | Ilya Maksimov | (Russia) | MF | 2 February 1987 (aged 19) | Youth Team | 2004 | | 9 | 1 |
| 88 | Oleksandr Horshkov | (Ukraine) | MF | 8 February 1970 (aged 36) | Saturn | 2004 | | | |
Forwards
| 11 | Aleksandr Kerzhakov | (Russia) | FW | 27 November 1982 (aged 23) | Youth Team | 2001 | | 205 | 94 |
| 30 | Semyon Melnikov | (Russia) | FW | 27 January 1985 (aged 21) | Youth Team | 2005 | | 0 | 0 |
| 40 | Maksim Rogov | (Russia) | FW | 11 February 1986 (aged 20) | Youth Team | 2005 | | 0 | 0 |
| 47 | Yuri Rodenkov | (Russia) | FW | 20 April 1986 (aged 20) | Youth Team | 2005 | | 0 | 0 |
| 61 | Fatih Tekke | (Turkey) | FW | 9 September 1977 (aged 29) | Trabzonspor | 2006 | | 16 | 4 |
| 78 | Aleksandr Panov | (Russia) | FW | 21 September 1975 (aged 31) | Torpedo Moscow | 2006 | | | |
Away on loan
| 5 | Milan Vještica | (Serbia and Montenegro) | DF | 15 November 1979 (aged 27) | Vojvodina | 2002 | | 90 | 5 |
| 7 | Oleg Trifonov | (Russia) | MF | 9 June 1981 (aged 25) | Rotor Volgograd | 2005 | | 17 | 1 |
| 20 | Oleg Kozhanov | (Russia) | FW | 5 June 1987 (aged 19) | Youth Team | 2004 | | 15 | 1 |
| 21 | Dragan Čadikovski | (North Macedonia) | FW | 13 January 1982 (aged 24) | NK Celje | 2005 | | 9 | 1 |
| 23 | Aleksandr Yevstafyev | (Russia) | MF | 15 January 1985 (aged 21) | Youth Team | 2004 | | 0 | 0 |
| 28 | Jan Flachbart | (Czech Republic) | DF | 3 March 1978 (aged 28) | Jablonec | 2004 | | 54 | 0 |
| 31 | Jaroslav Nesvadba | (Czech Republic) | DF | 5 May 1982 (aged 24) | Jablonec | 2006 | | 1 | 0 |
| 32 | Robertas Poškus | (Lithuania) | FW | 5 May 1979 (aged 27) | Krylia Sovetov | 2005 | | 32 | 4 |
Left during the season
| 19 | Veliče Šumulikoski | (North Macedonia) | MF | 24 April 1981 (aged 25) | 1. Slovácko | 2004 | | 76 | 2 |
| 43 | Oleg Vlasov | (Russia) | MF | 10 December 1984 (aged 21) | Metallurg Pikalyovo | 2002 | | 59 | 4 |

== Transfers ==
=== In ===
| Date | Position | Nationality | Name | From | Fee | Ref. |
|---|---|---|---|---|---|---|
| Winter 2006 | DF | (Czech Republic) | Jaroslav Nesvadba | Jablonec 97 | Undisclosed | |
| Summer 2006 | MF | (South Korea) | Hyun Young-min | Ulsan Hyundai Horang-i | Undisclosed | |
| Summer 2006 | FW | (Russia) | Aleksandr Panov | Torpedo Moscow | Undisclosed | |
| Summer 2006 | FW | (Turkey) | Fatih Tekke | Trabzonspor | Undisclosed | |
| 28 June 2006 | DF | (South Korea) | Kim Dong-jin | Anyang LG Cheetahs | Undisclosed | |
| 30 June 2006 | MF | (South Korea) | Lee Ho | Ulsan Hyundai Horang-i | Undisclosed | |
| 29 November 2006 | DF | (Netherlands) | Fernando Ricksen | Rangers | Undisclosed | |

=== Loans in ===
| Date from | Position | Nationality | Name | From | Date to | Ref. |
|---|---|---|---|---|---|---|
| 11 August 2006 | DF | (Netherlands) | Fernando Ricksen | Rangers | End of Season | |

=== Out ===
| Date | Position | Nationality | Name | To | Fee | Ref. |
|---|---|---|---|---|---|---|
| 11 July 2006 | MF | (North Macedonia) | Veliče Šumulikoski | Bursaspor | Undisclosed | |

=== Loans out ===
| Date from | Position | Nationality | Name | To | Date to | Ref. |
|---|---|---|---|---|---|---|
| 11 July 2006 | DF | (Serbia and Montenegro) | Milan Vještica | Rostov | 1 January 2007 | |
| 8 August 2006 | MF | (Russia) | Aleksandr Yevstafyev | Khimki | Summer 2007 | |
| 8 August 2006 | FW | (North Macedonia) | Dragan Čadikovski | Publikum Celje | Summer 2007 | |
| 26 August 2006 | FW | (Lithuania) | Robertas Poškus | Dynamo Moscow | End of Season | |
| 30 August 2006 | DF | (Czech Republic) | Jan Flachbart | Sigma Olomouc | 31 January 2007 | |
| Summer 2006 | DF | (Czech Republic) | Jaroslav Nesvadba | Mladá Boleslav | End of 2007 Season | |
| Summer 2006 | MF | (Russia) | Oleg Trifonov | Kuban Krasnodar | | |
| Summer 2006 | FW | (Russia) | Oleg Kozhanov | Ural Sverdlovsk | End of 2007 Season | |

=== Released ===
| Date | Position | Nationality | Name | Joined | Date | Ref. |
|---|---|---|---|---|---|---|
| 7 July 2006 | MF | (Russia) | Oleg Vlasov | Saturn | 7 July 2006 | |

== Competitions ==
=== Overall record ===
| Competition | First match | Last match | Starting round | Final position | Record | | | | | | | |
| Competition | First match | Last match | Starting round | Final position | Pld | W | D | L | GF | GA | GD | Win % |
|---|---|---|---|---|---|---|---|---|---|---|---|---|
| Premier League | 19 March 2006 | 26 November 2006 | Matchday 1 | 4th | 30 | 13 | 11 | 6 | 42 | 30 | +12 | 43.33 |
| 2005–06 Russian Cup | 4 March 2006 | 10 May 2006 | Round of 16 | Semifinal | 6 | 3 | 0 | 3 | 7 | 7 | +0 | 50.00 |
| 2006–07 Russian Cup | 2 July 2006 | see 2007 season | Round of 32 | Round of 32 | 2 | 2 | 0 | 0 | 4 | 2 | +2 | 100.00 |
| UEFA Cup | see 2005 season | 6 April 2006 | Round of 32 | Quarterfinal | 6 | 3 | 2 | 1 | 8 | 7 | +1 | 50.00 |
| Total | | | | | 44 | 21 | 13 | 10 | 61 | 46 | +15 | 47.73 |

Last updated: 26 November 2006
Source: #Competitions

=== UEFA Cup ===
==== Qualifying rounds ====
| 15 February 2006 Round of 32 1st leg | Rosenborg (Norway) | 0 – 2 | (Russia) Zenit St.Petersburg | Trondheim, Norway |
| MSK (UTC+4) | Riseth (yellow card) 62'; Koné (yellow card) 80' | Report | Arshavin 22'; Anyukov (yellow card) 28'; Kerzhakov 32'; Čontofalský (yellow card) 46'; Škrtel (yellow card) 54'; Kerzhakov (yellow card) 73' | Stadium: Lerkendal Stadion; Attendance: 11,082; Referee: Lucílio Batista (Portugal) |

| 23 February 2006 Round of 32 2nd leg | Zenit St.Petersburg (Russia) | 2 – 1 (4 – 1 agg.) | (Norway) Rosenborg | Saint Petersburg, Russia |
| MSK (UTC+4) | Škrtel (yellow card) 42'; Horshkov (yellow card) 54'; Arshavin 54'; Denisov 86' | Report | Riseth 45'; Koppinen (yellow card) 51' | Stadium: Petrovsky Stadium; Attendance: 21,500; Referee: Vladimír Hriňák (Slovakia) |

| 9 March 2006 Round of 16 1st leg | Marseille (France) | 0 – 1 | (Russia) Zenit St.Petersburg | Marseille, France |
| MSK (UTC+4) | Lamouchi (yellow card) 60'; Ribéry (yellow card) 70' (yellow-red card); Oruma (yellow card) 90+3' | Report | Škrtel (yellow card) 35'; Arshavin 51'; Radimov (yellow card) 58'; Trifonov (yellow card) 67'; Malafeev (yellow card) 90+2' | Stadium: Stade Vélodrome; Attendance: 25,000; Referee: Luis Medina Cantalejo (Spain) |

| 16 March 2006 Round of 16 2nd leg | Zenit St.Petersburg (Russia) | 1 – 1 (2 – 1 agg.) | (France) Marseille | Saint Petersburg, Russia |
| MSK (UTC+4) | Vještica (yellow card) 37'; Kerzhakov 69' | Report | Cana (yellow card) 18'; Déhu 74'; Carrasso (red card) 90' | Stadium: Petrovsky Stadium; Attendance: 21,838; Referee: Herbert Fandel (Germany) |

| 30 March 2006 Quarterfinal 1st leg | Sevilla (Spain) | 4 – 1 | (Russia) Zenit St.Petersburg | Seville, Spain |
| MSK (UTC+4) | Saviola 14', 80'; Martí 56' (pen.); Martí (yellow card) 66'; Kanouté (yellow card) 77'; Palop (yellow card) 89'; Adriano 90+2' | Report | Kerzhakov 45'; Hagen (red card) 58'; Šumulikoski (yellow card) 60'; Arshavin (yellow card) 67' (red card) 89'; Horshkov (yellow card) 90' | Stadium: Ramón Sánchez Pizjuán Stadium; Attendance: 45,000; Referee: Alain Hamer (Luxembourg) |

| 6 April 2006 Quarterfinal 2nd leg | Zenit St.Petersburg (Russia) | 1 – 1 (2 – 5 agg.) | (Spain) Sevilla | Saint Petersburg, Russia |
| MSK (UTC+4) | Radimov (yellow card) 30'; Anyukov (yellow card) 51'; Hyun 51'; Križanac (red card) 68' | Report | Dani Alves (yellow card) 29'; Fabiano (yellow card) 54'; Kepa 64' (red card) 65' | Stadium: Petrovsky Stadium; Attendance: 20,000; Referee: Stefano Farina (Italy) |

=== Premier League ===
==== Results by round ====
| Round | 1 | 2 | 3 | 4 | 5 | 6 | 7 | 8 | 9 | 10 | 11 | 12 | 13 | 14 | 15 | 16 | 17 | 18 | 19 | 20 | 21 | 22 | 23 | 24 | 25 | 26 | 27 | 28 | 29 | 30 |
|---|---|---|---|---|---|---|---|---|---|---|---|---|---|---|---|---|---|---|---|---|---|---|---|---|---|---|---|---|---|---|
| Ground | H | A | H | A | H | A | H | A | H | A | H | H | A | H | A | A | H | A | H | A | H | A | H | A | H | A | A | H | A | H |
| Result | D | W | D | L | W | D | L | L | W | D | D | W | D | W | D | D | W | W | W | W | W | L | W | L | D | L | W | D | W | D |

Updated to match(es) played on 26 November 2006. Source: See Results
A = Away; H = Home; W = Win; D = Draw; L = Loss

==== Results ====
| 19 March 2006 1 | Zenit St.Petersburg | 1 – 1 | Saturn | Saint Petersburg |
| 14:00 MSK (UTC+4) | Hagen (yellow card) 15'; Radimov (yellow card) 39'; Denisov (yellow card) 53'; Križanac (yellow card) 55'; Poškus 74'; Arshavin (yellow card) 79' | Report | Obžera 28'; Eremenko (yellow card) 31'; Vukčević (yellow card) 42'; Petráš (yellow card) 44'; Igonin (yellow card) 59'; Česnauskis (yellow card) 79'; Bareiro (yellow card) 81'; Géder (yellow card) 90+' | Stadium: Petrovsky Stadium; Attendance: 20,000; Referee: Alexander Kolobaev |

| 26 March 2006 2 | Amkar Perm | 1 – 3 | Zenit St.Petersburg | Perm |
| 16:00 MSK (UTC+4) | Dujmović (yellow card) 4'; Savin 63'; Sirakov (yellow card) 85' | Report | Spivak 31'; Mareš (yellow card) 57'; Arshavin (yellow card) 61'; Šírl 65', 86'; Denisov (yellow card) 72' | Stadium: Zvezda Stadium; Attendance: 11,600; Referee: Yuri Baskakov |

| 2 April 2006 3 | Zenit St.Petersburg | 1 – 1 | Rostov | Saint Petersburg |
| MSK (UTC+4) | Hagen 37' | Report | Kanyenda 53' (yellow card) 84'; Tanasijević (yellow card) 90' | Stadium: Petrovsky Stadium; Attendance: 17,000; Referee: Almir Kayumov |

| 9 April 2006 4 | Krylia Sovetov | 3 – 2 | Zenit St.Petersburg | Samara |
| 16:00 MSK (UTC+4) | Medvedev 13'; Mujiri 18' (pen.), 43' (pen.); Booth (yellow card) 51'; Husin (yellow card) 73' | Report | Kerzhakov 9' (pen.), 86'; Križanac (yellow card) 36'; Malafeev (yellow card) 42'; Radimov (yellow card) 75'; Arshavin (yellow card) 86'; Hagen (red card) 89' | Stadium: Metallurg Stadium; Attendance: 24,000; Referee: Valentin Ivanov |

| 15 April 2006 5 | Zenit St.Petersburg | 3 – 1 | Luch-Energiya Vladivostok | Saint Petersburg |
| 20:00 MSK (UTC+4) | Kerzhakov 12'; Škrtel (yellow card) 16'; Vlasov 66'; Arshavin 71'; Poškus (yellow card) 89' | Report | Ospeshinskiy 27'; Lobov (yellow card) 39'; Astafyev (yellow card) 48'; Arkhipov (yellow card) 82' | Stadium: Petrovsky Stadium; Attendance: 21,000; Referee: Alexey Nikolaev |

| 23 April 2006 6 | Spartak Nalchik | 1 – 1 | Zenit St.Petersburg | Nalchik |
| 17:00 MSK (UTC+4) | Serdyukov (yellow card) 34'; Pylypchuk (yellow card) 36'; Mostovyi (yellow card) 53'; Džudović (yellow card) 56'; Poroshyn 82' (yellow card) 89' | Report | Horshkov (yellow card) 13'; Škrtel (yellow card) 32'; Kerzhakov 63'; Arshavin (yellow card) 72'; Nesvadba (yellow card) 85' | Stadium: Spartak Stadium; Attendance: 14,500; Referee: Vladimir Pettay |

| 30 April 2006 7 | Zenit St.Petersburg | 1 – 4 | Spartak Moscow | Saint Petersburg |
| 14:00 MSK (UTC+4) | Covalciuc 3' (o.g.); Šírl (yellow card) 15'; Radimov (yellow card) 38'; Škrtel (yellow card) 59' | Report | Covalciuc (yellow card) 27'; Pavlyuchenko 35' (pen.); Pjanović 46', 72'; Bazhenov 75'; Kowalewski (yellow card) 84' | Stadium: Petrovsky Stadium; Attendance: 21,700; Referee: Alexander Gonchar |

| 6 May 2006 8 | Lokomotiv Moscow | 3 – 1 | Zenit St.Petersburg | Moscow |
| 19:00 MSK (UTC+4) | Traoré 4'; Sychev 10'; Loskov 89'; Kruglov (yellow card) 89'; Asatiani (yellow card) 90' | Report | Kerzhakov (penalty missed) 17'; Radimov (yellow card) 66'; Šírl (yellow card) 71'; Škrtel (yellow card) 74' (yellow-red card) 80'; Denisov 90' (pen.) | Stadium: RZD Arena; Attendance: 18,223; Referee: Stanislav Sukhina |

| 14 May 2006 9 | Zenit St.Petersburg | 1 – 0 | Rubin Kazan | Saint Petersburg |
| 20:00 MSK (UTC+4) | Anyukov (yellow card) 25'; Hagen (yellow card) 36'; Arshavin (yellow card) 40'; Denisov 42' | Report | Bazayev (yellow card) 45'; Calisto (yellow card) 63'; Gațcan (yellow card) 64' | Stadium: Petrovsky Stadium; Attendance: 18,000; Referee: Valentin Ivanov |

| 11 July 2006 10 | Moscow | 0 – 0 | Zenit St.Petersburg | Moscow |
| 19:00 MSK (UTC+4) | Rebeja (yellow card) 17'; Okoronkwo (yellow card) 58'; Semak (yellow card) 76' | Report | Radimov (yellow card) 32'; Hagen (yellow card) 36'; Škrtel (yellow card) 49'; Lee (yellow card) 86' | Stadium: Eduard Streltsov Stadium; Attendance: 5,000; Referee: Igor Egorov |

| 19 July 2006 11 | Zenit St.Petersburg | 0 – 0 | CSKA Moscow | Saint Petersburg |
| 19:00 MSK (UTC+4) | Radimov (yellow card) 38'; Škrtel (yellow card) 44'; Lee (yellow card) 59' | Report | Rahimić (yellow card) 30'; V.Berezutski (yellow card) 39'; Carvalho (yellow card) 60'; Dudu (yellow card) 76'; Šemberas (yellow card) 84' | Stadium: Petrovsky Stadium; Attendance: 21,500; Referee: Aleksandr Gonchar |

| 22 July 2006 12 | Zenit St.Petersburg | 2 – 1 | Torpedo Moscow | Saint Petersburg |
| MSK (UTC+4) | Hagen 25'; Arshavin 27' (yellow card) 63'; Kerzhakov (penalty missed) 35'; Lee (yellow card) 45+'; Radimov (yellow card) 77' | Report | Lutsenko (yellow card) 39'; Budylin 42' (pen.); Jokić (yellow card) 58' | Stadium: Petrovsky Stadium; Attendance: 18,667; Referee: Alexey Tyumin |

| 29 July 2006 13 | Dynamo Moscow | 2 – 2 | Zenit St.Petersburg | Moscow |
| MSK (UTC+4) | Derlei 51'; Cícero 78'; Lima (yellow card) 81'; Fernández (yellow card) 87' | Report | Kerzhakov 29'; Horshkov 63'; Maksimov (yellow card) 72'; Škrtel (yellow card) 88'; Kim (yellow card) 90' | Stadium: Central Dynamo Stadium; Attendance: 8,500; Referee: Stanislav Sukhina |

| 6 August 2006 14 | Zenit St.Petersburg | 1 – 0 | Shinnik Yaroslavl | Saint Petersburg |
| 14:30 MSK (UTC+4) | Tekke 69'; Spivak (yellow card) 90' | Report | Shirko (yellow card) 57'; Amelyanchuk (yellow card) 64'; Radosavljević (yellow card) 87' | Stadium: Petrovsky Stadium; Attendance: 22,000; Referee: Yuri Baskakov |

| 12 August 2006 15 | Tom Tomsk | 2 – 2 | Zenit St.Petersburg | Tomsk |
| 16:00 MSK (UTC+4) | Klimov 11'; Yanotovsky (yellow card) 35'; Skerla (yellow card) 45'; Bugayev (yellow card) 76'; Pogrebnyak 90' | Report | Anyukov (yellow card) 10'; Tekke 13'; Poškus 19'; Radimov (yellow card) 24'; Lee (yellow card) 90' | Stadium: Trud Stadium; Attendance: 15,000; Referee: Valentin Ivanov |

| 19 August 2006 16 | Saturn | 0 – 0 | Zenit St.Petersburg | Ramenskoye |
| MSK (UTC+4) | Eremenko (yellow card) 11'; Džiaukštas (yellow card) 58'; Polovinchuk (red card) 90' | Report | Ricksen (yellow card) 34'; Horshkov (yellow card) 59'; Arshavin (yellow card) 69'; Škrtel (yellow card) 73' | Stadium: Saturn Stadium; Attendance: 12,500; Referee: Vladimir Pettay |

| 27 August 2006 17 | Zenit St.Petersburg | 2 – 0 | Amkar Perm | Saint Petersburg |
| MSK (UTC+4) | Hagen (yellow card) 7'; Tekke 28'; Kim (yellow card) 63'; Cherenchikov 67' (o.g.); Radimov (yellow card) 79' | Report | Olexici (yellow card) 66' | Stadium: Petrovsky Stadium; Attendance: 19,500; Referee: Aleksei Nikolaev |

| 9 September 2006 18 | Rostov | 1 – 3 | Zenit St.Petersburg | Rostov-on-Don |
| MSK (UTC+4) | Tanasijević (yellow card) 22'; Laizāns (yellow card) 52'; Bochkov (yellow card) 69'; Burchenko 81' (yellow card) 88' | Report | Tekke 13'; Hyun (yellow card) 38'; Šírl (yellow card) 43'; Ricksen 53'; Anyukov 60'; Kim (yellow card) 85'; Malafeev (yellow card) 85' | Stadium: Olimp-2; Attendance: 9,200; Referee: Mikhail Veselovsky |

| 17 September 2006 19 | Zenit St.Petersburg | 1 – 0 | Krylia Sovetov | Saint Petersburg |
| 14:30 MSK (UTC+4) | Radimov (yellow card) 45'; Kerzhakov 81' | Report | Medvedev (yellow card) 45'; Bobyor (yellow card) 72' | Stadium: Petrovsky Stadium; Attendance: 21,000; Referee: Konrad Plautz |

| 24 September 2006 20 | Luch-Energiya Vladivostok | 0 – 2 | Zenit St.Petersburg | Vladivostok |
| 12:00 MSK (UTC+4) | Sheshukov (yellow card) 51'; Astafyev (yellow card) 55'; Cherkes (yellow card) 84' | Report | Arshavin 1'; Kim (yellow card) 8'; Shtanyuk 62' (o.g.) | Stadium: Dynamo Stadium; Attendance: 10,200; Referee: Igor Zakharov |

| 1 October 2006 21 | Zenit St.Petersburg | 4 – 0 | Spartak Nalchik | Saint Petersburg |
| 14:30 MSK (UTC+4) | Arshavin (yellow card) 15'; Ricksen 25' (yellow card) 45'; Hagen (yellow card) 45'; Arshavin 69'; Tekke (yellow card) 71'; Radimov (yellow card) 71'; Denisov 85'; Mareš 90' | Report | Bitokov (yellow card) 12'; Chikhradze (yellow card) 58'; Džudović (yellow card) 72'; Jefthon (yellow card) 77' | Stadium: Petrovsky Stadium; Attendance: 21,000; Referee: Aleksei Sergeyev |

| 14 October 2006 22 | Spartak Moscow | 1 – 0 | Zenit St.Petersburg | Moscow |
| 16:00 MSK (UTC+4) | Géder (yellow card) 75'; Bystrov 90' | Report | Šírl (yellow card) 83' | Stadium: Luzhniki Stadium; Attendance: 35,000; Referee: Vladimir Pettay |

| 22 October 2006 23 | Zenit St.Petersburg | 4 – 1 | Lokomotiv Moscow | Saint Petersburg |
| 16:00 MSK (UTC+4) | Hagen 17'; Arshavin 45'; Denisov 67'; Spivak 90+' | Report | Evseev (yellow card) 46'; Kingston (yellow card) 65'; O'Connor 89' | Stadium: Petrovsky Stadium; Attendance: 21,750; Referee: Aleksandr Gvardis |

| 25 October 2006 24 | Rubin Kazan | 3 – 0 | Zenit St.Petersburg | Kazan |
| 18:00 MSK (UTC+4) | Domínguez 9', 77' (pen.) (yellow card) 57'; Benachour (yellow card) 65' (goal) 67'; Gilmullin (yellow card) 72'; Ayupov (yellow card) 74' | Report | Hagen (yellow card) 41' | Stadium: Central Stadium; Attendance: 26,000; Referee: Mikhail Veselovsky |

| 29 October 2006 25 | Zenit St.Petersburg | 1 – 1 | Moscow | Saint Petersburg |
| 14:30 MSK (UTC+4) | Arshavin 14'; Radimov (yellow card) 72'; Šírl (yellow card) 80'; Tekke (yellow card) 90' | Report | Barrientos (yellow card) 25'; Rebeja (yellow card) 32'; Adamov (yellow card) 43'; Bystrov 90' | Stadium: Petrovsky Stadium; Attendance: 18,700; Referee: Stanislav Sukhina |

| 5 November 2006 26 | CSKA Moscow | 1 – 0 | Zenit St.Petersburg | Moscow |
| 14:00 MSK (UTC+4) | Vágner Love (yellow card) 17'; Carvalho 58' (pen.) (yellow card) 78'; Šemberas (yellow card) 61'; Krasić (yellow card) 82'; Zhirkov (yellow card) 83' | Report | Škrtel (yellow card) 43'; Tekke (yellow card) 46'; Arshavin (yellow card) 53'; Kim (yellow card) 56'; Hyun (yellow card) 65'; Spivak (yellow card) 85'; Križanac (yellow card) 87' | Stadium: Dynamo Stadium; Attendance: 16,000; Referee: Vladimir Pettay |

| 8 November 2006 27 | Torpedo Moscow | 1 – 2 | Zenit St.Petersburg | Moscow |
| 18:30 MSK (UTC+4) | Florescu (yellow card) 53'; Mamayev 59' | Report | Arshavin 9' (pen.); Lee 45'; Malafeev (yellow card) 63'; Ricksen (yellow card) 68' | Stadium: Luzhniki Stadium; Attendance: 1,500; Referee: Eduard Malyi |

| 12 November 2006 28 | Zenit St.Petersburg | 0 – 0 | Dynamo Moscow | Saint Petersburg |
| MSK (UTC+4) | Šírl (yellow card) 90+' | Report | Ovchinnikov (yellow card) 89'; Derlei (yellow card) 90' | Stadium: Petrovsky Stadium; Attendance: 44,000; Referee: Vladimir Pettay |

| 18 November 2006 29 | Shinnik Yaroslavl | 1 – 2 | Zenit St.Petersburg | Yaroslavl |
| 14:00 MSK (UTC+4) | Amelyanchuk (yellow card) 17'; Matić (yellow card) 57'; Budiša 90'; Kline (yellow card) 90' | Report | Arshavin (yellow card) 55'; Škrtel 68'; Lee (yellow card) 90'; Iordache 90+' (o.g.) | Stadium: Shinnik Stadium; Attendance: 5,000; Referee: Alexey Nikolaev |

| 26 November 2006 30 | Zenit St.Petersburg | 0 – 0 | Tom Tomsk | Saint Petersburg |
| 16:00 MSK (UTC+4) | Kim (yellow card) 30'; Panov (yellow card) 41'; Hagen (red card) 52'; Radimov (yellow card) 66'; Spivak (yellow card) 87' | Report | Bugayev (yellow card) 6'; Klimov (yellow card) 16' (yellow-red card) 69'; Skoblyakov (yellow card) 27'; Krunić (yellow card) 51'; Kaleshin (yellow card) 67'; Yanotovsky (yellow card) 77'; Bulyga (yellow card) 79'; Kulchy (yellow card) 83' | Stadium: Petrovsky Stadium; Attendance: 22,500; Referee: Yuri Baskakov |

==== Table ====
| Pos | Team | Pld | W | D | L | GF | GA | GD | Pts | Qualification or relegation |
|---|---|---|---|---|---|---|---|---|---|---|
| 2 | Spartak Moscow | 30 | 15 | 13 | 2 | 60 | 36 | +24 | 58 | Qualification to Champions League third qualifying round |
| 3 | Lokomotiv Moscow | 30 | 15 | 8 | 7 | 47 | 34 | +13 | 53 | Qualification to UEFA Cup first round (Note: Qualified as the winner of 2006–07 Russian Cup.) |
| 4 | Zenit St. Petersburg | 30 | 13 | 11 | 6 | 42 | 30 | +12 | 50 | Qualification to UEFA Cup second qualifying round |
| 5 | Rubin Kazan | 30 | 14 | 7 | 9 | 45 | 35 | +10 | 49 | Qualification to Intertoto Cup second round |
| 6 | FC Moscow | 30 | 10 | 13 | 7 | 41 | 37 | +4 | 43 | |

Source: RFPL
Rules for classification: 1st points; 2nd matches won; 3rd goal difference; 4th head-to-head (points, matches won, goal difference, goals scored, away goals scored); 5th goals scored; 6th away goals scored; 7th drawing of lots

=== Russian Cup ===
==== 2005/06 ====
| 4 March 2006 Round of 16 1st leg | Zenit St.Petersburg | 2 – 0 | Terek Grozny | Saint Petersburg |
| 20:00 MSK (UTC+4) | Škrtel 24'; Kerzhakov 69' | Report | Sharonov (yellow card) 63'; Kurdyukov (yellow card) 77' | Stadium: Petrovsky Stadium; Attendance: 8,300; Referee: Alexey Sergeev |

| 12 March 2006 Round of 16 2nd leg | Terek Grozny | 1 – 0 (1 – 2 agg.) | Zenit St.Petersburg | Pyatigorsk |
| 16:00 MSK (UTC+4) | Adiyev (yellow card) 4'; Dzhabrailov 60' | Report | | Stadium: Central Stadium; Attendance: 4,000; Referee: Aleksei Nikolaev |

| 22 March 2006 Quarterfinal 1st leg | Zenit St.Petersburg | 2 – 0 | Torpedo Moscow | Saint Petersburg |
| 20:00 MSK (UTC+4) | Kerzhakov 22', 51'; Hagen (yellow card) 44'; Anyukov (yellow card) 57'; Arshavin (yellow card) 88'; Križanac (yellow card) 90+' | Report | Perov (yellow card) 16'; Stepanov (yellow card) 31' | Stadium: Petrovsky Stadium; Attendance: 5,700; Referee: Stanislav Sukhina |

| 12 April 2006 Quarterfinal 2nd leg | Torpedo Moscow | 2 – 3 (2 – 5 agg.) | Zenit St.Petersburg | Moscow |
| 19:00 MSK (UTC+4) | Tumasyan (yellow card) 26'; Budylin (penalty missed) 41' 72', 76'; Bolikhov (yellow card) 29' (yellow-red card) 90'; Jääger (yellow card) 71' | Report | Kerzhakov 23', 26' (pen.); Škrtel 45'; Vještica (yellow card) 50'; Anyukov (yellow card) 78' | Stadium: Luzhniki Stadium; Attendance: 3,000; Referee: Igor Egorov |

| 3 May 2006 Semifinal 1st leg | CSKA Moscow | 1 – 0 | Zenit St.Petersburg | Moscow |
| 14:00 MSK (UTC+4) | Rahimić (yellow card) 25'; Carvalho 61' | Report | Flachbart (yellow card) 28'; Šumulikoski (yellow card) 73' | Stadium: Luzhniki Stadium; Attendance: 6,500; Referee: Igor Egorov |

| 10 May 2006 Semifinal 2nd leg | Zenit St.Petersburg | 0 – 3 (0 – 4 agg.) | CSKA Moscow | Saint Petersburg |
| 20:00 MSK (UTC+4) | Anyukov (yellow card) 31'; Arshavin (yellow card) 63'; Poškus (yellow card) 73' | Report | Vágner Love 9'; Dudu 19'; Ignashevich 29' (yellow card) 31'; Zhirkov (yellow card) 45' | Stadium: Petrovsky Stadium; Attendance: 15,000; Referee: Aleksandr Gvardis |

==== 2006/07 ====
| 2 July 2006 Round of 32 1st leg | Chita | 1 – 2 | Zenit St.Petersburg | Chita |
| 13:00 MSK (UTC+4) | Zakharenkov 6'; Bodyalov (yellow card) 19'; Garmashov (yellow card) 68'; Ekimov (yellow card) 79'; Podprugin (yellow card) 89' | Report | Škrtel (yellow card) 39'; Spivak (penalty missed) 67'; Maksimov 80'; Šírl (yellow card) 81'; Vlasov 85' | Stadium: Lokomotiv Stadium; Attendance: 8,700; Referee: Sergei Marushko |

| 20 September 2006 Round of 32 2nd leg | Zenit St.Petersburg | 2 – 1 (4 – 2 agg.) | Chita | Saint Petersburg |
| 20:00 MSK (UTC+4) | Spivak (yellow card) 28'; Radimov 29'; Mareš (yellow card) 33'; Panov 44' (yellow card) 57'; Šírl (yellow card) 86'; Križanac (yellow card) 88' | Report | Agrofenin (yellow card) 24'; A.Kreisman 43' (pen.) | Stadium: Petrovsky Stadium; Attendance: 9,000; Referee: Sergey Timofeev |

Round 16 took place during the 2007 season.

== Squad statistics ==
As of match played 26 November 2006

=== Appearances and goals ===
| No. | Pos | Nat | Player | Total | | Premier League | | 05/06 Russian Cup | | 06/07 Russian Cup | | UEFA Cup | |
| No. | Pos | Nat | Player | Apps | Goals | Apps | Goals | Apps | Goals | Apps | Goals | Apps | Goals |
|---|---|---|---|---|---|---|---|---|---|---|---|---|---|
| 1 | GK | (Czech Republic) CZE | Kamil Čontofalský | 10 | 0 | 4 | 0 | 3 | 0 | 1 | 0 | 2 | 0 |
| 2 | MF | (Russia) RUS | Vladislav Radimov | 38 | 1 | 27 | 0 | 2+1 | 0 | 2 | 1 | 6 | 0 |
| 3 | DF | (Slovakia) SVK | Martin Škrtel | 37 | 3 | 26 | 1 | 4 | 2 | 2 | 0 | 5 | 0 |
| 4 | DF | (Croatia) CRO | Ivica Križanac | 25 | 0 | 10+6 | 0 | 2 | 0 | 1 | 0 | 6 | 0 |
| 6 | MF | (Ukraine) UKR | Oleksandr Spivak | 21 | 2 | 3+10 | 2 | 2 | 0 | 2 | 0 | 3+1 | 0 |
| 8 | DF | (Czech Republic) CZE | Pavel Mareš | 21 | 1 | 12 | 1 | 5 | 0 | 1 | 0 | 1+2 | 0 |
| 9 | MF | (Czech Republic) CZE | Radek Šírl | 36 | 2 | 21+3 | 2 | 3+1 | 0 | 1+1 | 0 | 6 | 0 |
| 10 | MF | (Russia) RUS | Andrey Arshavin | 37 | 10 | 28 | 7 | 2+1 | 0 | 1 | 0 | 5 | 3 |
| 11 | FW | (Russia) RUS | Aleksandr Kerzhakov | 34 | 14 | 16+5 | 6 | 5 | 5 | 2 | 0 | 6 | 3 |
| 13 | MF | (South Korea) KOR | Hyun Young-min | 17 | 1 | 7+3 | 0 | 1+2 | 0 | 0+1 | 0 | 1+2 | 1 |
| 14 | DF | (Norway) NOR | Erik Hagen | 34 | 3 | 24 | 3 | 4 | 0 | 1 | 0 | 5 | 0 |
| 15 | DF | (South Korea) KOR | Kim Dong-jin | 17 | 0 | 17 | 0 | 0 | 0 | 0 | 0 | 0 | 0 |
| 16 | GK | (Russia) RUS | Vyacheslav Malafeev | 36 | 0 | 26 | 0 | 3+1 | 0 | 1 | 0 | 4+1 | 0 |
| 17 | MF | (South Korea) KOR | Lee Ho | 18 | 1 | 10+7 | 1 | 0 | 0 | 1 | 0 | 0 | 0 |
| 22 | DF | (Russia) RUS | Aleksandr Anyukov | 37 | 1 | 25 | 1 | 4+1 | 0 | 1 | 0 | 6 | 0 |
| 25 | DF | (Netherlands) NED | Fernando Ricksen | 15 | 2 | 14 | 2 | 0 | 0 | 1 | 0 | 0 | 0 |
| 27 | MF | (Russia) RUS | Igor Denisov | 35 | 5 | 20+4 | 4 | 2+2 | 0 | 1+1 | 0 | 3+2 | 1 |
| 38 | DF | (Russia) RUS | Andrei Nagumanov | 1 | 0 | 0 | 0 | 0 | 0 | 0+1 | 0 | 0 | 0 |
| 61 | FW | (Turkey) TUR | Fatih Tekke | 16 | 4 | 14+2 | 4 | 0 | 0 | 0 | 0 | 0 | 0 |
| 78 | FW | (Russia) RUS | Aleksandr Panov | 9 | 1 | 2+6 | 0 | 0 | 0 | 1 | 1 | 0 | 0 |
| 87 | MF | (Russia) RUS | Ilya Maksimov | 8 | 1 | 3+4 | 0 | 0 | 0 | 0+1 | 1 | 0 | 0 |
| 88 | MF | (Ukraine) UKR | Oleksandr Horshkov | 24 | 1 | 9+5 | 1 | 5 | 0 | 1 | 0 | 3+1 | 0 |
Players who away on loan:
| 5 | DF | (Serbia and Montenegro) SCG | Milan Vještica | 9 | 0 | 3+1 | 0 | 4 | 0 | 0 | 0 | 1 | 0 |
| 7 | MF | (Russia) RUS | Oleg Trifonov | 7 | 0 | 0+2 | 0 | 2 | 0 | 0 | 0 | 0+3 | 0 |
| 20 | FW | (Russia) RUS | Oleg Kozhanov | 4 | 0 | 0 | 0 | 1+2 | 0 | 0 | 0 | 0+1 | 0 |
| 21 | FW | (North Macedonia) MKD | Dragan Čadikovski | 2 | 0 | 0 | 0 | 2 | 0 | 0 | 0 | 0 | 0 |
| 28 | DF | (Czech Republic) CZE | Jan Flachbart | 3 | 0 | 0 | 0 | 2+1 | 0 | 0 | 0 | 0 | 0 |
| 31 | DF | (Czech Republic) CZE | Jaroslav Nesvadba | 1 | 0 | 1 | 0 | 0 | 0 | 0 | 0 | 0 | 0 |
| 32 | FW | (Lithuania) LTU | Robertas Poškus | 16 | 2 | 4+6 | 2 | 2+1 | 0 | 1 | 0 | 1+1 | 0 |
Players who left Zenit during the season:
| 19 | MF | (North Macedonia) MKD | Veliče Šumulikoski | 14 | 0 | 3+2 | 0 | 3+3 | 0 | 0 | 0 | 1+2 | 0 |
| 43 | MF | (Russia) RUS | Oleg Vlasov | 11 | 2 | 1+5 | 1 | 3 | 0 | 0+1 | 1 | 1 | 0 |

=== Goal Scorers ===
| Place | Position | Nation | Number | Name | Premier League | 05/06 Russian Cup | 06/07 Russian Cup | UEFA Cup | Total |
|---|---|---|---|---|---|---|---|---|---|
| 1 | MF | (Russia) | 11 | Aleksandr Kerzhakov | 6 | 5 | 0 | 3 | 14 |
| 2 | MF | (Russia) | 10 | Andrey Arshavin | 7 | 0 | 0 | 3 | 10 |
| 3 | MF | (Russia) | 27 | Igor Denisov | 4 | 0 | 0 | 1 | 5 |
| 4 | FW | (Turkey) | 61 | Fatih Tekke | 4 | 0 | 0 | 0 | 4 |
| 4 | | | | Own goal | 4 | 0 | 0 | 0 | 4 |
| 6 | DF | (Norway) | 14 | Erik Hagen | 3 | 0 | 0 | 0 | 3 |
| 6 | DF | (Slovakia) | 3 | Martin Škrtel | 1 | 2 | 0 | 0 | 3 |
| 8 | MF | (Czech Republic) | 9 | Radek Šírl | 2 | 0 | 0 | 0 | 2 |
| 8 | FW | (Lithuania) | 32 | Robertas Poškus | 2 | 0 | 0 | 0 | 2 |
| 8 | DF | (Netherlands) | 25 | Fernando Ricksen | 2 | 0 | 0 | 0 | 2 |
| 8 | MF | (Ukraine) | 6 | Oleksandr Spivak | 2 | 0 | 0 | 0 | 2 |
| 8 | MF | (Russia) | 43 | Oleg Vlasov | 1 | 0 | 1 | 0 | 2 |
| 13 | MF | (Ukraine) | 88 | Oleksandr Horshkov | 1 | 0 | 0 | 0 | 1 |
| 13 | DF | (Russia) | 22 | Aleksandr Anyukov | 1 | 0 | 0 | 0 | 1 |
| 13 | DF | (Czech Republic) | 8 | Pavel Mareš | 1 | 0 | 0 | 0 | 1 |
| 13 | MF | (South Korea) | 17 | Lee Ho | 1 | 0 | 0 | 0 | 1 |
| 13 | MF | (Russia) | 87 | Ilya Maksimov | 0 | 0 | 1 | 0 | 0 |
| 13 | MF | (Russia) | 2 | Vladislav Radimov | 0 | 0 | 1 | 0 | 0 |
| 13 | FW | (Russia) | 78 | Aleksandr Panov | 0 | 0 | 1 | 0 | 0 |
| 13 | MF | (South Korea) | 13 | Hyun Young-min | 0 | 0 | 0 | 1 | 1 |
| | | | | TOTALS | 42 | 7 | 4 | 8 | 61 |

=== Clean sheets ===
| Place | Position | Nation | Number | Name | Premier League | 05/06 Russian Cup | 06/07 Russian Cup | UEFA Cup | Total |
|---|---|---|---|---|---|---|---|---|---|
| 1 | GK | (Russia) | 16 | Vyacheslav Malafeev | 11 | 2 | 0 | 1 | 14 |
| 2 | GK | (Czech Republic) | 1 | Kamil Čontofalský | 0 | 0 | 0 | 1 | 1 |
| | | | | TOTALS | 11 | 2 | 0 | 2 | 15 |

=== Disciplinary record ===
| Number | Nation | Position | Name | Premier League | | 05/06 Russian Cup | | 06/07 Russian Cup | | UEFA Cup | | Total | |
| Number | Nation | Position | Name | Booked | Sent off (straight red) | Booked | Sent off (straight red) | Booked | Sent off (straight red) | Booked | Sent off (straight red) | Booked | Sent off (straight red) |
| 1 | (Czech Republic) | GK | Kamil Čontofalský | 0 | 0 | 0 | 0 | 0 | 0 | 1 | 0 | 1 | 0 |
| 2 | (Russia) | MF | Vladislav Radimov | 13 | 0 | 0 | 0 | 0 | 0 | 2 | 0 | 15 | 0 |
| 3 | (Slovakia) | DF | Martin Škrtel | 10 | 1 | 0 | 0 | 1 | 0 | 3 | 0 | 14 | 1 |
| 4 | (Croatia) | DF | Ivica Križanac | 3 | 0 | 1 | 0 | 1 | 0 | 0 | 1 | 5 | 1 |
| 6 | (Ukraine) | MF | Oleksandr Spivak | 3 | 0 | 0 | 0 | 1 | 0 | 0 | 0 | 4 | 0 |
| 8 | (Czech Republic) | DF | Pavel Mareš | 1 | 0 | 0 | 0 | 1 | 0 | 0 | 0 | 2 | 0 |
| 9 | (Czech Republic) | MF | Radek Šírl | 6 | 0 | 0 | 0 | 2 | 0 | 0 | 0 | 8 | 0 |
| 10 | (Russia) | MF | Andrey Arshavin | 10 | 0 | 2 | 0 | 0 | 0 | 1 | 1 | 13 | 1 |
| 11 | (Russia) | FW | Aleksandr Kerzhakov | 0 | 0 | 0 | 0 | 0 | 0 | 1 | 0 | 1 | 0 |
| 13 | (South Korea) | MF | Hyun Young-min | 2 | 0 | 0 | 0 | 0 | 0 | 0 | 0 | 2 | 0 |
| 14 | (Norway) | DF | Erik Hagen | 7 | 1 | 1 | 0 | 0 | 0 | 0 | 1 | 8 | 2 |
| 15 | (South Korea) | DF | Kim Dong-jin | 6 | 0 | 0 | 0 | 0 | 0 | 0 | 0 | 6 | 0 |
| 16 | (Russia) | GK | Vyacheslav Malafeev | 3 | 0 | 0 | 0 | 0 | 0 | 1 | 0 | 4 | 0 |
| 17 | (South Korea) | MF | Lee Ho | 5 | 0 | 0 | 0 | 0 | 0 | 0 | 0 | 5 | 0 |
| 22 | (Russia) | DF | Aleksandr Anyukov | 2 | 0 | 3 | 0 | 0 | 0 | 2 | 0 | 6 | 0 |
| 25 | (Netherlands) | DF | Fernando Ricksen | 3 | 0 | 0 | 0 | 0 | 0 | 0 | 0 | 3 | 0 |
| 27 | (Russia) | MF | Igor Denisov | 2 | 0 | 0 | 0 | 0 | 0 | 0 | 0 | 2 | 0 |
| 61 | (Turkey) | FW | Fatih Tekke | 3 | 0 | 0 | 0 | 0 | 0 | 0 | 0 | 3 | 0 |
| 78 | (Russia) | FW | Aleksandr Panov | 1 | 0 | 0 | 0 | 1 | 0 | 0 | 0 | 2 | 0 |
| 87 | (Russia) | MF | Ilya Maksimov | 1 | 0 | 0 | 0 | 0 | 0 | 0 | 0 | 1 | 0 |
| 88 | (Ukraine) | MF | Oleksandr Horshkov | 2 | 0 | 0 | 0 | 0 | 0 | 2 | 0 | 4 | 0 |
Players away on loan:
| 5 | (Serbia and Montenegro) | DF | Milan Vještica | 0 | 0 | 1 | 0 | 0 | 0 | 1 | 0 | 2 | 0 |
| 7 | (Russia) | MF | Oleg Trifonov | 0 | 0 | 0 | 0 | 0 | 0 | 1 | 0 | 1 | 0 |
| 28 | (Czech Republic) | DF | Jan Flachbart | 0 | 0 | 1 | 0 | 0 | 0 | 0 | 0 | 1 | 0 |
| 31 | (Czech Republic) | DF | Jaroslav Nesvadba | 1 | 0 | 0 | 0 | 0 | 0 | 0 | 0 | 1 | 0 |
| 32 | (Lithuania) | FW | Robertas Poškus | 1 | 0 | 1 | 0 | 0 | 0 | 0 | 0 | 2 | 0 |
Players who left Zenit St.Petersburg during the season:
| 19 | (North Macedonia) | MF | Veliče Šumulikoski | 0 | 0 | 1 | 0 | 0 | 0 | 1 | 0 | 2 | 0 |
| | | | TOTALS | 85 | 2 | 11 | 0 | 7 | 0 | 16 | 3 | 119 | 5 |
