= 2009 FC Zenit Saint Petersburg season =

FC Zenit Saint Petersburg
2008-09 season
- Chairman: Aleksandr Dyukov
- Manager: Anatoli Davydov
- Stadium: Petrovsky Stadium
- Premier League: 3rd
- 2009–10 Russian Cup: Progressed to 2010 season
- 2008–09 UEFA Cup: Round of 16 vs Udinese
- 2009–10 UEFA Europa League: Play-off round vs Nacional
- Top goalscorer: League: Fatih Tekke (8); All: Fatih Tekke (10)

The 2009 Zenit St.Petersburg season was the club's fifteenth season in the Russian Premier League, the highest tier of association football in Russia. Zenit finished third in the Russian Premier League, progressed to the quarterfinal of the 2009–10 Russian Cup, reached the round of 16 in the 2008–09 UEFA Cup and the playoff round of the 2009–10 UEFA Europa League.

== Squad ==
As of match played 29 November 2009

| No. | Name | Nationality | Position | Date of birth (age) (Note: Age as of the end of the season) | Signed from | Signed in | Contract ends | Apps. | Goals |
Goalkeepers
| 1 | Kamil Čontofalský | (Slovakia) | GK | 3 June 1978 (aged 31) | Bohemians 1905 | 2003 | | 76 | 0 |
| 16 | Vyacheslav Malafeev | (Russia) | GK | 4 March 1979 (aged 30) | Trainee | 1999 | | 311 | 0 |
| 22 | Dmitri Borodin | (Russia) | GK | 8 October 1977 (aged 32) | Anzhi Makhachkala | 2009 | | 0 | 0 |
| 51 | Vladimir Mukhin | (Russia) | GK | 30 October 1990 (aged 19) | DYuSSh Smena-Zenit | 2008 | | 0 | 0 |
| 90 | Nikolai Zabolotny | (Russia) | GK | 16 April 1990 (aged 19) | Trainee | 2007 | | 0 | 0 |
| 91 | Andrei Zaytsev | (Russia) | GK | 14 January 1991 (aged 18) | DYuSSh Smena-Zenit | 2008 | | 0 | 0 |
Defenders
| 2 | Aleksandr Anyukov | (Russia) | DF | 28 September 1982 (aged 27) | Krylia Sovetov | 2005 | | 168 | 9 |
| 3 | Fernando Meira | (Portugal) | DF | 28 September 1982 (aged 27) | Galatasaray | 2009 | | 26 | 1 |
| 4 | Ivica Križanac | (Croatia) | DF | 13 April 1979 (aged 30) | Dyskobolia Grodzisk Wielkopolski | 2005 | | 127 | 6 |
| 5 | Kim Dong-jin | (South Korea) | DF | 29 January 1982 (aged 27) | Seoul | 2006 | | 86 | 4 |
| 6 | Nicolas Lombaerts | (Belgium) | DF | 20 March 1985 (aged 24) | KAA Gent | 2007 | | 44 | 4 |
| 14 | Tomáš Hubočan | (Slovakia) | DF | 17 September 1985 (aged 24) | MŠK Žilina | 2008 | | 28 | 0 |
| 37 | Dmitri Grebenev | (Russia) | DF | 28 January 1991 (aged 18) | DYuSSh Smena-Zenit | 2009 | | 0 | 0 |
| 50 | Igor Cheminava | (Russia) | DF | 23 March 1991 (aged 18) | DYuSSh Smena-Zenit | 2008 | | 0 | 0 |
| 55 | Yan Bobrovsky | (Russia) | DF | 18 September 1989 (aged 20) | Trainee | 2007 | | 0 | 0 |
| 65 | Yuriy Boyev | (Russia) | DF | 16 January 1991 (aged 18) | DYuSSh Smena-Zenit | 2008 | | 0 | 0 |
Midfielders
| 10 | Danny | (Portugal) | MF | 7 August 1983 (aged 26) | Dynamo Moscow | 2008 | | 25 | 8 |
| 11 | Radek Šírl | (Czech Republic) | MF | 20 March 1981 (aged 28) | Sparta Prague | 2003 | | 183 | 7 |
| 15 | Roman Shirokov | (Russia) | MF | 6 July 1981 (aged 28) | Khimki | 2008 | | 67 | 4 |
| 17 | Alessandro Rosina | (Italy) | MF | 31 January 1984 (aged 25) | Torino | 2009 | | 12 | 2 |
| 18 | Konstantin Zyryanov | (Russia) | MF | 5 October 1977 (aged 32) | Torpedo Moscow | 2007 | | 122 | 27 |
| 20 | Viktor Fayzulin | (Russia) | MF | 22 April 1986 (aged 23) | Spartak Nalchik | 2008 | | 59 | 8 |
| 21 | Igor Semshov | (Russia) | MF | 6 April 1978 (aged 31) | Dynamo Moscow | 2009 | | 34 | 9 |
| 23 | Szabolcs Huszti | (Hungary) | MF | 18 April 1983 (aged 26) | Hannover 96 | 2009 | | 27 | 3 |
| 27 | Igor Denisov | (Russia) | MF | 17 May 1984 (aged 25) | Trainee | 2002 | | 224 | 27 |
| 30 | Pavel Komolov | (Russia) | MF | 10 March 1989 (aged 20) | DYuSSh Smena-Zenit | 2006 | | 0 | 0 |
| 34 | Vladimir Bystrov | (Russia) | MF | 31 January 1984 (aged 25) | Spartak Moscow | 2009 | | 96 | 16 |
| 35 | Anton Sosnin | (Russia) | MF | 27 January 1990 (aged 19) | Trainee | 2007 | | 0 | 0 |
| 47 | Basel Abdoulfattakh | (Russia) | MF | 6 March 1990 (aged 19) | DYuSSh Smena-Zenit | 2008 | | 0 | 0 |
| 53 | Pavel Mochalin | (Russia) | MF | 16 January 1989 (aged 20) | DYuSSh Smena-Zenit | 2008 | | 0 | 0 |
| 57 | Aleksei Ionov | (Russia) | MF | 18 February 1989 (aged 20) | Trainee | 2007 | | 20 | 1 |
| 59 | Sergey Vasetsky | (Russia) | MF | 17 January 1990 (aged 19) | DYuSSh Smena-Zenit | 2008 | | 0 | 0 |
| 69 | Yevgeni Bashkirov | (Russia) | MF | 6 July 1991 (aged 18) | DYuSSh Smena-Zenit | 2009 | | 0 | 0 |
| 75 | Ilya Sagdatullin | (Russia) | MF | 27 February 1991 (aged 18) | Trainee | 2007 | | 0 | 0 |
| 77 | Alexander Petrov | (Russia) | MF | 20 January 1990 (aged 19) | Trainee | 2007 | | 0 | 0 |
| 80 | Maxim Batov | (Russia) | MF | 5 June 1992 (aged 17) | DYuSSh Smena-Zenit | 2009 | | 0 | 0 |
| 92 | Nikita Bocharov | (Russia) | MF | 12 June 1992 (aged 17) | DYuSSh Smena-Zenit | 2009 | | 0 | 0 |
| 96 | Roland Gigolayev | (Russia) | MF | 4 January 1990 (aged 19) | Yunost Vladikavkaz | 2005 | | 0 | 0 |
| 98 | Sergei Petrov | (Russia) | MF | 2 January 1991 (aged 18) | DYuSSh Smena-Zenit | 2008 | | 0 | 0 |
Forwards
| 9 | Fatih Tekke | (Turkey) | FW | 9 September 1977 (aged 32) | Trabzonspor | 2006 | | 92 | 29 |
| 19 | Sergei Kornilenko | (Belarus) | FW | 14 June 1983 (aged 26) | Tom Tomsk | 2009 | | 18 | 1 |
| 31 | Vitali Galysh | (Russia) | FW | 13 May 1990 (aged 19) | DYuSSh Smena-Zenit | 2008 | | 0 | 0 |
| 33 | Pavel Ignatovich | (Russia) | FW | 24 May 1989 (aged 20) | Trainee | 2007 | | 2 | 0 |
| 36 | Stanislav Matyash | (Russia) | FW | 23 April 1991 (aged 18) | Trainee | 2007 | | 0 | 0 |
| 70 | Vyacheslav Sushkin | (Russia) | FW | 11 March 1991 (aged 18) | DYuSSh Smena-Zenit | 2009 | | 0 | 0 |
| 71 | Sergei Kostin | (Russia) | FW | 15 June 1991 (aged 18) | DYuSSh Smena-Zenit | 2009 | | 0 | 0 |
| 73 | Stanislav Murikhin | (Russia) | FW | 21 January 1992 (aged 17) | DYuSSh Smena-Zenit | 2009 | | 0 | 0 |
| 79 | Andrei Ornat | (Russia) | FW | 4 March 1991 (aged 18) | Trainee | 2007 | | 0 | 0 |
| 87 | Eugene Starikov | (United States) | FW | 17 November 1988 (aged 21) | Bradenton Academics | 2009 | | 0 | 0 |
| 88 | Mateja Kežman | (Serbia) | FW | 12 April 1979 (aged 30) | loan from Paris Saint-Germain | 2009 | | 10 | 2 |
| 99 | Maksim Kanunnikov | (Russia) | FW | 14 July 1991 (aged 18) | DYuSSh Smena-Zenit | 2009 | | 1 | 0 |
Out on loan
| 28 | Sébastien Puygrenier | (France) | DF | 28 January 1982 (aged 27) | Nancy | 2008 | | 14 | 1 |
| 32 | Artyom Kulesha | (Russia) | DF | 14 January 1990 (aged 19) | Trainee | 2007 | | 0 | 0 |
| 34 | Aleksandr Khokhlov | (Russia) | DF | 30 September 1988 (aged 21) | Trainee | 2006 | | 1 | 0 |
| 37 | German Pyatnikov | (Russia) | MF | 23 January 1988 (aged 21) | Trainee | 2006 | | 0 | 0 |
| 41 | Mikhail Kerzhakov | (Russia) | GK | 28 January 1987 (aged 22) | Youth Team | 2004 | | 0 | 0 |
| 48 | Nikita Kolesnikov | (Russia) | MF | 12 August 1988 (aged 21) | Trainee | 2007 | | 0 | 0 |
Left during the season
| 8 | Pavel Pogrebnyak | (Russia) | FW | 8 November 1983 (aged 26) | Tom Tomsk | 2007 | | 97 | 30 |
| 44 | Anatoliy Tymoshchuk | (Ukraine) | MF | 30 March 1979 (aged 30) | Shakhtar Donetsk | 2007 | | 100 | 18 |

=== Out on loan ===
Note: Flags indicate national team as defined under FIFA eligibility rules; some limited exceptions apply. Players may hold more than one non-FIFA nationality.

| No. | Pos. | Nation | Player |
|---|---|---|---|
| 28 | DF | FRA | Sébastien Puygrenier (at AS Monaco) |
| 32 | DF | RUS | Artyom Kulesha (at Smena-Zenit) |
| 34 | DF | RUS | Aleksandr Khokhlov (at Kuban Krasnodar) |

| No. | Pos. | Nation | Player |
|---|---|---|---|
| 37 | MF | RUS | German Pyatnikov (at Smena-Zenit) |
| 41 | GK | RUS | Mikhail Kerzhakov (at Volgar Astrakhan) |
| 48 | MF | RUS | Nikita Kolesnikov (at Smena-Zenit) |

== Transfers ==
=== In ===
| Date | Position | Nationality | Name | From | Fee | Ref. |
|---|---|---|---|---|---|---|
| Winter 2009 | GK | (Russia) | Dmitri Borodin | Anzhi Makhachkala | Undisclosed | |
| Winter 2009 | MF | (Russia) | Maxim Batov | Youth Team | Promoted | |
| Winter 2009 | MF | (Russia) | Nikita Bocharov | Youth Team | Promoted | |
| Winter 2009 | FW | (Russia) | Stanislav Murikhin | Youth Team | Promoted | |
| 2 February 2009 | MF | (Hungary) | Szabolcs Huszti | Hannover 96 | Undisclosed | |
| 11 March 2009 | DF | (Portugal) | Fernando Meira | Galatasaray | Undisclosed | |
| Summer 2009 | MF | (Russia) | Vladimir Bystrov | Spartak Moscow | Undisclosed | |
| Summer 2009 | FW | (Belarus) | Sergei Kornilenko | Tom Tomsk | Undisclosed | |
| 31 July 2009 | MF | (Italy) | Alessandro Rosina | Torino | Undisclosed | |
| 31 August 2009 | FW | (Serbia) | Mateja Kežman | Paris Saint-Germain | Undisclosed | |

=== Out ===
| Date | Position | Nationality | Name | To | Fee | Ref. |
|---|---|---|---|---|---|---|
| Winter 2009 | MF | (South Korea) | Lee Ho | Seongnam Ilhwa Chunma | Undisclosed | |
| Winter 2009 | FW | (Russia) | Yevgeni Izvekov | Yelets | Undisclosed | |
| Winter 2009 | FW | (Russia) | Yegor Okorokov | Smena-Zenit | Undisclosed | |
| 3 February 2009 | MF | (Russia) | Andrey Arshavin | Arsenal | Undisclosed | |
| 12 March 2009 | MF | (Argentina) | Alejandro Domínguez | Rubin Kazan | Undisclosed | |
| 1 July 2009 | MF | (Ukraine) | Anatoliy Tymoshchuk | Bayern Munich | Undisclosed | |
| 1 August 2009 | FW | (Russia) | Pavel Pogrebnyak | VfB Stuttgart | Undisclosed | |

=== Loans out ===
| Date from | Position | Nationality | Name | To | Date to | Ref. |
|---|---|---|---|---|---|---|
| Winter 2009 | DF | (Russia) | Aleksandr Khokhlov | Kuban Krasnodar | | |
| Winter 2009 | DF | (Russia) | Artyom Kulesha | Smena-Zenit | | |
| Winter 2009 | DF | (Russia) | Ivan Lapin | Rostov | | |
| Winter 2009 | MF | (Russia) | Nikita Kolesnikov | Smena-Zenit | | |
| Winter 2009 | MF | (Russia) | German Pyatnikov | Smena-Zenit | | |
| 15 January 2009 | DF | (France) | Sébastien Puygrenier | Bolton Wanderers | Summer 2009 | |
| Summer 2009 | DF | (France) | Sébastien Puygrenier | AS Monaco | Winter 2010 | |

=== Released ===
| Date | Position | Nationality | Name | Joined | Date | Ref. |
|---|---|---|---|---|---|---|
| Winter 2009 | DF | (Russia) | Yuriy Vorobyov | | | |
| Winter 2009 | FW | (Russia) | Dmitri Nechayev | | | |
| 28 August 2009 | MF | (Netherlands) | Fernando Ricksen | Fortuna Sittard | 2 December 2010 | |

== Competitions ==
=== Overall record ===
| Competition | First match | Last match | Starting round | Final position | Record | | | | | | | |
| Competition | First match | Last match | Starting round | Final position | Pld | W | D | L | GF | GA | GD | Win % |
|---|---|---|---|---|---|---|---|---|---|---|---|---|
| Premier League | 15 March 2009 | 29 November 2009 | Matchday 1 | 3rd | 30 | 15 | 9 | 6 | 48 | 27 | +21 | 50.00 |
| Russian Cup | 15 July 2009 | see 2010 season | Round of 32 | Round of 16 | 2 | 2 | 0 | 0 | 4 | 1 | +3 | 100.00 |
| UEFA Cup | 18 February 2009 | 19 March 2009 | Round of 32 | Round of 16 | 4 | 3 | 0 | 1 | 5 | 4 | +1 | 75.00 |
| UEFA Europa League | 20 August 2009 | 27 August 2009 | Playoff Round | Playoff Round | 2 | 0 | 1 | 1 | 4 | 5 | −1 | 0.00 |
| Total | | | | | 38 | 20 | 10 | 8 | 61 | 37 | +24 | 52.63 |

Last updated: 29 November 2009
Source: Competitions

=== Premier League ===
==== Results by round ====
| Round | 1 | 2 | 3 | 4 | 5 | 6 | 7 | 8 | 9 | 10 | 11 | 12 | 13 | 14 | 15 | 16 | 17 | 18 | 19 | 20 | 21 | 22 | 23 | 24 | 25 | 26 | 27 | 28 | 29 | 30 |
|---|---|---|---|---|---|---|---|---|---|---|---|---|---|---|---|---|---|---|---|---|---|---|---|---|---|---|---|---|---|---|
| Ground | A | H | A | H | A | H | A | H | A | A | H | A | H | A | H | A | H | A | H | A | H | A | H | H | A | H | A | H | A | H |
| Result | D | W | W | D | D | W | L | W | L | L | W | D | W | L | D | D | L | W | D | W | W | W | W | W | W | D | L | W | D | W |

Updated to match(es) played on 29 November 2009. Source: See Results
A = Away; H = Home; W = Win; D = Draw; L = Loss

==== Results ====
| 15 March 2009 1 | Spartak Moscow | 1 – 1 | Zenit St. Petersburg | Moscow |
| 14:00 MSK (UTC+4) | Saenko 2'; Bystrov (yellow card) 51'; Parshivlyuk (yellow card) 52' | Report | Pogrebnyak 17'; Tymoshchuk (yellow card) 31'; Denisov (yellow card) 53'; Fayzulin (yellow card) 74' | Stadium: Luzhniki Stadium; Attendance: 50,000; Referee: Stanislav Sukhina |

| 22 March 2009 2 | Zenit St. Petersburg | 2 – 1 | Saturn Ramenskoye | Saint Petersburg |
| 14:00 MSK (UTC+4) | Križanac 9'; Tekke 66' (yellow card) 88' | Report | Topić 36'; Evseev (yellow card) 39'; Zelão (yellow card) 42'; Okoronkwo (yellow card) 83' | Stadium: Petrovsky Stadium; Referee: Almir Kayumov |

| 5 April 2009 3 | Tom Tomsk | 0 – 3 | Zenit St. Petersburg | Tomsk |
| 11:45 MSK (UTC+4) | Smirnov (yellow card) 24'; Klimov (yellow card) 33'; Yevsikov (yellow card) 39'; Ivanov (yellow card) 70' | Report | Kim (yellow card) 40'; Meira 54'; Denisov 60'; Tekke 82' | Stadium: Trud Stadium; Attendance: 15,000; Referee: Aleksei Nikolaev |

| 12 April 2009 4 | Zenit St. Petersburg | 0 – 0 | Amkar Perm | Saint Petersburg |
| 16:30 MSK (UTC+4) | Meira (yellow card) 75' | Report | Cherenchikov (yellow card) 4'; Novaković (yellow card) 45'; Belorukov (yellow card) 63'; Narubin (yellow card) 79'; Sirakov (yellow card) 83'; Drinčić (yellow card) 89' | Stadium: Petrovsky Stadium; Attendance: 19,500; Referee: Maksim Layushkin |

| 19 April 2009 5 | Lokomotiv Moscow | 1 – 1 | Zenit St. Petersburg | Moscow |
| 14:00 MSK (UTC+4) | Odemwingie (yellow card) 25'; Dujmović (yellow card) 44'; Rodolfo 70' (yellow card) 79'; Baša (red card) 79'; Čech (yellow card) 88' | Report | Tymoshchuk (yellow card) 50'; Križanac (yellow card) 52'; Kim 58' | Stadium: Lokomotiv Stadium; Attendance: 17,102; Referee: Aleksandr Gvardis |

| 25 April 2009 6 | Zenit St. Petersburg | 4 – 2 | Khimki | Saint Petersburg |
| 16:30 MSK (UTC+4) | Trivunović 8' (o.g.); Kim (yellow card) 18'; Semshov 28'; Danny (yellow card) 58'; Tekke 63'; Pogrebnyak 88' | Report | Kozhanov (yellow card) 13' (yellow-red card) 15'; Budyanskiy (yellow card) 17'; Maksimov 45'; Zinovyev (yellow card) 53'; Samsonov (yellow card) 69'; Antipenko 81' | Stadium: Petrovsky Stadium; Attendance: 20,000; Referee: Vyacheslav Harlamov |

| 3 May 2009 7 | Rostov | 2 – 1 | Zenit St. Petersburg | Rostov-on-Don |
| 15:15 MSK (UTC+4) | Akimov 53'; Rozhkov (yellow card) 60'; Astafyev (yellow card) 69'; Gațcan 85' | Report | Meira (yellow card) 75'; Pogrebnyak 83' (pen.); Tekke (yellow card) 88' (yellow-red card) 90+'; Križanac (yellow card) 90+' | Stadium: Olimp-2; Attendance: 16,500; Referee: Ildus Biglov |

| 10 May 2009 8 | Zenit St. Petersburg | 2 – 0 | Krylia Sovetov | Saint Petersburg |
| 16:30 MSK (UTC+4) | Semshov (yellow card) 27'; Denisov (yellow card) 49'; Zyryanov 57'; Pogrebnyak 69'; Tymoshchuk (yellow card) 90+' | Report | Ajinjal (yellow card) 67'; Koller (yellow card) 87'; Bobyor (yellow card) 90+' | Stadium: Petrovsky Stadium; Attendance: 21,500; Referee: Aleksei Nikolaev |

| 17 May 2009 9 | CSKA Moscow | 2 – 1 | Zenit St. Petersburg | Moscow |
| 19:00 MSK (UTC+4) | Maâzou 32'; Šemberas (yellow card) 59'; Erkin (yellow card) 65'; Love 85' (pen.); Carvalho (yellow card) 90' | Report | Semshov 54'; Hubočan (yellow card) 78' | Stadium: Arena Khimki; Attendance: 21,700; Referee: Stanislav Sukhina |

| 24 May 2009 10 | Dynamo Moscow | 1 – 0 | Zenit St. Petersburg | Moscow |
| 14:00 MSK (UTC+4) | Kolodin (yellow card) 59'; Ropotan (yellow card) 69'; Khokhlov 84'; Gabulov (yellow card) 90+'; D.Kombarov (yellow card) 90+' | Report | Denisov (yellow card) 41' (yellow-red card) 90+'; Tymoshchuk (yellow card) 57'; Anyukov (yellow card) 90+' | Stadium: Central Dynamo Stadium; Attendance: 11,160; Referee: Eduard Malyi |

| 30 May 2009 11 | Zenit St. Petersburg | 2 – 0 | Kuban Krasnodar | Saint Petersburg |
| 14:00 MSK (UTC+4) | Semshov 38'; Zyryanov 45'; Anyukov (yellow card) 61'; Šírl (yellow card) 76'; Semshov (yellow card) 79' | Report | Zaseev (yellow card) 6'; Kaita (yellow card) 59' | Stadium: Petrovsky Stadium; Attendance: 20,000; Referee: Aleksandr Kolobaev |

| 14 June 2009 12 | Spartak Nalchik | 2 – 2 | Zenit St. Petersburg | Nalchik |
| 19:0 MSK (UTC+4) | Gogua (yellow card) 28'; Geteriev 44', 49' | Report | Semshov 32'; Huszti (yellow card) 54'; Anyukov 63'; Križanac (yellow card) 70' | Stadium: Spartak Stadium; Attendance: 11,500; Referee: Aleksei Kovalyov |

| 12 July 2009 13 | Zenit St. Petersburg | 1 – 0 | Moscow | Saint Petersburg |
| 14:00 MSK (UTC+4) | Kim (yellow card) 49'; Križanac 56' (yellow card) 76'; Meira (yellow card) 57' | Report | Česnauskis (yellow card) 32'; Okoronkwo (yellow card) 75'; Tarasov (yellow card) 80' | Stadium: Petrovsky Stadium; Attendance: 20,000; Referee: Eduard Malyi |

| 19 July 2009 14 | Terek Grozny | 3 – 2 | Zenit St. Petersburg | Grozny |
| 20:30 MSK (UTC+4) | Georgiev 22'; Gvazava (yellow card) 23'; Kobenko (yellow card) 26'; Pancu (yellow card) 31'; Lakhiyalov 57'; Iliev 90' (yellow card) 90' | Report | Ionov (yellow card) 9'; Pogrebnyak (yellow card) 30' (goal) 75'; Huszti 72'; Denisov (yellow card) 90+'; Meira (yellow card) 90+' | Stadium: Sultan Bilimkhanov Stadium; Attendance: 8,100; Referee: Almir Kayumov |

| 25 July 2009 15 | Zenit St. Petersburg | 0 – 0 | Rubin Kazan | Saint Petersburg |
| 18:45 MSK (UTC+4) | Huszti (yellow card) 10'; Anyukov (yellow card) 17'; Fayzulin (yellow card) 75' | Report | Navas (yellow card) 33'; Noboa (yellow card) 48'; Kvirkvelia (yellow card) 59' (yellow-red card) 63'; Adamov (yellow card) 86' | Stadium: Petrovsky Stadium; Attendance: 21,000; Referee: Aleksei Nikolaev |

| 2 August 2009 16 | Saturn Ramenskoye | 2 – 2 | Zenit St. Petersburg | Ramenskoye |
| 17:15 MSK (UTC+4) | Kuzmichyov (yellow card) 12' (yellow-red card) 84'; Kirichenko 15' (pen.); Zelão (yellow card) 76'; Nakhushev 85' | Report | Križanac (yellow card) 14'; Kornilenko 28'; Shirokov 54'; Kim (yellow card) 58'; Meira (yellow card) 84' | Stadium: Saturn Stadium; Attendance: 12,300; Referee: Sergei Karasev |

| 9 August 2009 17 | Zenit St. Petersburg | 0 – 2 | Tom Tomsk | Saint Petersburg |
| 16:15 MSK (UTC+4) | | Report | Kharitonov (yellow card) 24' (goal) 67'; Jokić 48'; Stroyev (yellow card) 54'; Dyadyun (yellow card) 75' | Stadium: Petrovsky Stadium; Attendance: 19,000; Referee: Vladimir Kazmenko |

| 15 August 2009 18 | Amkar Perm | 2 – 4 | Zenit St. Petersburg | Perm |
| MSK (UTC+4) | Kushev 2', 14' (yellow card) 37'; Carlos (yellow card) 24'; Grishin (yellow card) 33'; Cherenchikov (yellow card) 38'; Sirakov (yellow card) 71'; Kalashnikov (yellow card) 85' (yellow-red card) 87' | Report | Denisov (yellow card) 2'; Semshov 28', 75'; Lombaerts 34'; Huszti 53'; Hubočan (yellow card) 90+' | Stadium: Zvezda Stadium; Attendance: 14,700; Referee: Ildus Biglov |

| 23 August 2009 19 | Zenit St. Petersburg | 1 – 1 | Lokomotiv Moscow | Saint Petersburg |
| 16:00 MSK (UTC+4) | Tekke 28'; Zyryanov (yellow card) 33'; Kim (yellow card) 90+' | Report | Wágner 9'; Yanbayev (yellow card) 55'; Bilyaletdinov (yellow card) 52'; Rodolfo (yellow card) 52'; Torbinski (yellow card) 64' | Stadium: Petrovsky Stadium; Attendance: 21,500; Referee: Stanislav Sukhina |

| 30 August 2008 20 | Khimki | 0 – 4 | Zenit St. Petersburg | Khimki |
| 14:00 MSK (UTC+4) | Gapon (yellow card) 34' (yellow-red card) 57'; Romaschenko (yellow card) 44'; Sansoni (yellow card) 54' (yellow-red card) 78' | Report | Tekke 24'; Bystrov 49'; Rosina 67'; Zinovyev 90+' (o.g.) | Stadium: Rodina Stadium; Attendance: 6,000; Referee: Vitali Doroshenko |

| 13 September 2009 21 | Zenit St. Petersburg | 2 – 0 | Rostov | Saint Petersburg |
| 18:30 MSK (UTC+4) | Meira (yellow card) 40'; Zyryanov 45'; Anyukov (yellow card) 68'; Bystrov 78' (yellow card) 88'; Semshov (yellow card) 89' | Report | Anđelković (yellow card) 10'; Lebedenko (yellow card) 45+' | Stadium: Petrovsky Stadium; Attendance: 20,000; Referee: Sergei Karasev |

| 20 September 2009 22 | Krylia Sovetov | 0 – 1 | Zenit St. Petersburg | Samara |
| 18:30 MSK (UTC+4) | Taranov (yellow card) 10'; Ignatyev (yellow card) 48'; Leilton (yellow card) 81' | Report | Bystrov 14'; Semshov (yellow card) 67'; Denisov (yellow card) 86' | Stadium: Metallurg Stadium; Attendance: 19,200; Referee: Aleksandr Gvardis |

| 26 September 2009 23 | Zenit St. Petersburg | 2 – 0 | CSKA Moscow | Saint Petersburg |
| 14:00 MSK (UTC+4) | Kežman (yellow card) 33' (goal) 45+1'; Huszti (yellow card) 36'; Bystrov (yellow card) 49' (goal) 87'; Meira (yellow card) 77' | Report | Krasić (yellow card) 20'; Guilherme (yellow card) 38'; González (yellow card) 49'; Šemberas (yellow card) 60'; Dzagoev (yellow card) 71'; Berezutski (yellow card) 77' | Stadium: Petrovsky Stadium; Attendance: 21,500; Referee: Stanislav Sukhina |

| 4 October 2009 24 | Zenit St. Petersburg | 2 – 1 | Dynamo Moscow | Saint Petersburg |
| 18:30 MSK (UTC+4) | Semshov (yellow card) 46'; Tekke 59' (yellow card) 89'; Kežman 62'; Križanac (yellow card) 90'; Denisov (yellow card) 90+' | Report | Shunin (yellow card) 42'; Fernández 44'; Granat (yellow card) 82'; K.Kombarov (red card) 90+' | Stadium: Petrovsky Stadium; Attendance: 19,300; Referee: Vladimir Kazmenko |

| 18 October 2009 25 | Kuban Krasnodar | 0 – 2 | Zenit St. Petersburg | Krasnodar |
| 18:30 MSK (UTC+4) | Babangida (yellow card) 33' | Report | Rosina 26'; Bystrov 49'; Šírl (yellow card) 58' | Stadium: Kuban Stadium; Attendance: 29,000; Referee: Aleksandr Kolobaev |

| 25 October 2009 26 | Zenit St. Petersburg | 2 – 2 | Spartak Nalchik | Saint Petersburg |
| 14:30 MSK (UTC+4) | Bystrov 7' (yellow card) 58'; Tekke 29' | Report | Siradze 10' (yellow card) 49'; Kontsedalov (yellow card) 30'; Geteriev (yellow card) 45+'; Leandro 65' | Stadium: Petrovsky Stadium; Attendance: 19,351; Referee: Aleksei Nikolaev |

| 31 October 2009 27 | Moscow | 1 – 0 | Zenit St. Petersburg | Moscow |
| 14:00 MSK (UTC+4) | Goore (yellow card) 20'; Sheshukov 85' | Report | Denisov (yellow card) 34'; Semshov (yellow card) 88' | Stadium: Eduard Streltsov Stadium; Attendance: 9,000; Referee: Aleksandr Gvardis |

| 8 November 2009 28 | Zenit St. Petersburg | 2 – 0 | Terek Grozny | Saint Petersburg |
| 16:45 MSK (UTC+4) | Tekke 26'; Utsiyev 39' (o.g.) | Report | Cléber (yellow card) 72'; Pancu (yellow card) 82' | Stadium: Petrovsky Stadium; Referee: Yuri Baskakov |

| 21 November 2009 29 | Rubin Kazan | 0 – 0 | Zenit St. Petersburg | Kazan |
| 14:00 MSK (UTC+4) | Sharonov (yellow card) 45'; Bukharov (yellow card) 47' | Report | Križanac (yellow card) 31'; Malafeev (yellow card) 39'; Tekke (yellow card) 45'; Anyukov (yellow card) 45'; Zyryanov (yellow card) 75' | Stadium: Central Stadium; Attendance: 22,000; Referee: Aleksandr Kolobaev |

| 29 November 2009 30 | Zenit St. Petersburg | 2 – 1 | Spartak Moscow | Saint Petersburg |
| 14:00 MSK (UTC+4) | Huszti (yellow card) 5' (yellow-red card) 44'; Bystrov (yellow card) 24'; Anyukov (yellow card) 45'; Zyryanov 45+'; Lombaerts 50' | Report | Boyarintsev (yellow card) 43'; Makeyev (yellow card) 70'; Fathi 83' (yellow card) 85'; Alex (yellow card) 90' | Stadium: Petrovsky Stadium; Attendance: 22,500; Referee: Stanislav Sukhina |

==== League table ====
| Pos | Team | Pld | W | D | L | GF | GA | GD | Pts | Qualification or relegation |
|---|---|---|---|---|---|---|---|---|---|---|
| 1 | Rubin Kazan (C) | 30 | 19 | 6 | 5 | 62 | 21 | +41 | 63 | Qualification to Champions League group stage |
| 2 | Spartak Moscow | 30 | 17 | 4 | 9 | 61 | 33 | +28 | 55 | Qualification to Champions League group stage |
| 3 | Zenit St. Petersburg | 30 | 15 | 9 | 6 | 48 | 27 | +21 | 54 | Qualification to Champions League third qualifying round (Note: Winners of 2009–10 Russian Cup, Zenit, qualified for the Champions League, that means the loser finalists Sibir Novosibirsk will play in third qualifying round of the UEFA Europa League.) |
| 4 | Lokomotiv Moscow | 30 | 15 | 9 | 6 | 43 | 30 | +13 | 54 | Qualification to Europa League play-off round |
| 5 | CSKA Moscow | 30 | 16 | 4 | 10 | 48 | 30 | +18 | 52 | Qualification to Europa League play-off round |

Source: RFPL (in Russian)
Rules for classification: 1st points; 2nd matches won; 3rd head-to-head (points, matches won, goal difference, goals scored, away goals scored); 4th goal difference; 5th goals scored; 6th away goals scored; 7th position in previous season or decision game
(C) Champions

=== Russian Cup ===
| 15 July 2009 Round of 32 | Torpedo Vladimir | 0 – 2 | Zenit St.Petersburg | Vladimir |
| 19:00 MSK (UTC+4) | Vyazmikin (yellow card) 53'; Trofimov (yellow card) 63'; Karatygin (yellow card) 76' | Report | Anyukov (yellow card) 12'; Zyryanov 34'; Pogrebnyak 45+' (pen.); Denisov (yellow card) 53'; Ionov (yellow card) 70'; Čontofalský (yellow card) 79' | Stadium: Torpedo stadium Attendance: 18,000; Referee: Maksim Layushkin |

| 5 August 2009 Round of 16 | Zenit St.Petersburg | 2 – 1 | Nizhny Novgorod | Saint Petersburg |
| 19:30 MSK (UTC+4) | Rosina 39'; Anyukov (yellow card) 66'; Kornilenko (yellow card) 69'; Shirokov (yellow card) 90+'; Križanac 97' (yellow card) 98' | Report | Shpedt (yellow card) 81'; Zyuzin 82'; Zemchenkov (yellow card) 92' | Stadium: Petrovsky Stadium; Referee: Vitali Doroshenko |

Quarterfinal took place during the 2010 season.

=== UEFA Cup ===
| 18 February 2009 Round of 32 1st leg | Zenit St.Petersburg (Russia) | 2 – 1 | (Germany) VfB Stuttgart | Saint Petersburg, Russia |
| 20:15 MSK (UTC+4) | Huszti 2'; Šírl (yellow card) 29'; Anyukov (yellow card) 38'; Tymoshchuk 45+3' (yellow card) 90+2'; Križanac (yellow card) 60' | Report | Gómez 15'; Lanig (yellow card) 36'; Magnin (yellow card) 45+3' | Stadium: Petrovsky Stadium; Attendance: 17,585; Referee: Bjorn Kuipers (Netherlands) |

| 26 February 2009 Round of 32 2nd leg | VfB Stuttgart (Germany) | 1 – 2 (2 – 4 agg.) | (Russia) Zenit St.Petersburg | Stuttgart, Germany |
| 23:45 MSK (UTC+4) | Gebhart 80'; Gómez (yellow card) 81' | Report | Danny (yellow card) 33'; Semshov 42'; Anyukov (yellow card) 44'; Huszti (yellow card) 66'; Fayzulin 86' | Stadium: Mercedes-Benz Arena; Attendance: 34,500; Referee: William Collum (Scotland) |

| 12 March 2009 Round of 16 1st leg | Udinese (Italy) | 2 – 0 | (Russia) Zenit St.Petersburg | Udine, Italy |
| 23:45 MSK (UTC+4) | D'Agostino (yellow card) 12'; Inler (yellow card) 27'; Coda (yellow card) 35'; Quagliarella 85' (yellow card) 90+3'; Di Natale 88' (pen.); Domizzi (yellow card) 88' | Report | Shirokov (yellow card) 24' (yellow-red card) 90+2'; Denisov (yellow card) 71'; Anyukov (yellow card) 90+1'; Križanac (yellow card) 90+2'; Tymoshchuk (yellow card) 90+6' | Stadium: Stadio Friuli; Attendance: 20,000; Referee: Eduardo Iturralde González (Spain) |

| 19 March 2009 Round of 16 2nd leg | Zenit St.Petersburg (Russia) | 1 – 0 (1 – 2 agg.) | (Italy) Udinese | Saint Petersburg, Russia |
| 20:30 MSK (UTC+4) | Tymoshchuk 34'; Križanac (yellow card) 90+4' | Report | Pepe (yellow card) 45+1'; Quagliarella (yellow card) 76' | Stadium: Petrovsky Stadium; Attendance: 19,500; Referee: Martin Atkinson (England) |

=== UEFA Europa League ===
| 20 August 2009 Play-off round 1st leg | Nacional (Portugal) | 4 – 3 | (Russia) Zenit St.Petersburg | Funchal, Portugal |
| 23:30 MSK (UTC+4) | Alberto 30' (yellow card) 66'; Cléber (yellow card) 35'; Aurélio 37' (yellow card) 38'; Silva 53'; Patacas (yellow card) 55'; Micael 74' | Report | Anyukov (yellow card) 21'; Shirokov (yellow card) 35'; Semshov 44', 55'; Meira (yellow card) 79'; Tekke 90+2' | Stadium: Estádio da Madeira; Attendance: 2,500; Referee: Cüneyt Çakır (Turkey) |

| 27 August 2009 Play-off round 2nd leg | Zenit St.Petersburg (Russia) | 1 – 1 (4 – 5 agg.) | (Portugal) Nacional | Saint Petersburg, Russia |
| 23:45 MSK (UTC+4) | Tekke 34'; Huszti (yellow card) 66'; Zyryanov (yellow card) 77'; Križanac (yellow card) 80'; Kim (yellow card) 90+4' | Report | Micael (yellow card) 14' (goal) 89'; Pinto (yellow card) 63'; Patacas (yellow card) 66'; Lopes (yellow card) 76' | Stadium: Petrovsky Stadium; Attendance: 20,000; Referee: Ivan Bebek (Croatia) |

== Squad statistics ==
As of match played 5 December 2009

=== Appearances and goals ===
| No. | Pos | Nat | Player | Total | | Premier League | | Russian Cup | | UEFA Cup | | Europa League | |
| No. | Pos | Nat | Player | Apps | Goals | Apps | Goals | Apps | Goals | Apps | Goals | Apps | Goals |
|---|---|---|---|---|---|---|---|---|---|---|---|---|---|
| 1 | GK | (Slovakia) SVK | Kamil Čontofalský | 4 | 0 | 2 | 0 | 1 | 0 | 0 | 0 | 1 | 0 |
| 2 | DF | (Russia) RUS | Aleksandr Anyukov | 34 | 1 | 27 | 1 | 2 | 0 | 3 | 0 | 2 | 0 |
| 3 | DF | (Portugal) POR | Fernando Meira | 26 | 1 | 22 | 1 | 2 | 0 | 0 | 0 | 2 | 0 |
| 4 | DF | (Croatia) CRO | Ivica Križanac | 25 | 3 | 18 | 2 | 1+1 | 1 | 4 | 0 | 0+1 | 0 |
| 5 | DF | (South Korea) KOR | Kim Dong-jin | 21 | 1 | 17 | 1 | 1 | 0 | 2 | 0 | 1 | 0 |
| 6 | DF | (Belgium) BEL | Nicolas Lombaerts | 18 | 2 | 14+1 | 2 | 1 | 0 | 0 | 0 | 2 | 0 |
| 9 | FW | (Turkey) TUR | Fatih Tekke | 25 | 10 | 14+6 | 8 | 0 | 0 | 0+3 | 0 | 1+1 | 2 |
| 10 | MF | (Portugal) POR | Danny | 8 | 0 | 8 | 0 | 0 | 0 | 0 | 0 | 0 | 0 |
| 11 | MF | (Czech Republic) CZE | Radek Šírl | 21 | 0 | 13+4 | 0 | 1 | 0 | 3 | 0 | 0 | 0 |
| 14 | DF | (Slovakia) SVK | Tomáš Hubočan | 13 | 0 | 8+3 | 0 | 0+1 | 0 | 0 | 0 | 1 | 0 |
| 15 | MF | (Russia) RUS | Roman Shirokov | 28 | 1 | 9+12 | 1 | 1+1 | 0 | 3 | 0 | 2 | 0 |
| 16 | GK | (Russia) RUS | Vyacheslav Malafeev | 34 | 0 | 28 | 0 | 1 | 0 | 4 | 0 | 1 | 0 |
| 17 | MF | (Italy) ITA | Alessandro Rosina | 12 | 3 | 5+4 | 2 | 1 | 1 | 0 | 0 | 0+2 | 0 |
| 18 | MF | (Russia) RUS | Konstantin Zyryanov | 38 | 5 | 30 | 4 | 2 | 1 | 4 | 0 | 2 | 0 |
| 19 | FW | (Belarus) BLR | Sergei Kornilenko | 18 | 1 | 4+7 | 1 | 1 | 0 | 4 | 0 | 2 | 0 |
| 20 | MF | (Russia) RUS | Viktor Fayzulin | 22 | 1 | 10+6 | 0 | 0+2 | 0 | 1+3 | 1 | 0 | 0 |
| 21 | MF | (Russia) RUS | Igor Semshov | 34 | 9 | 20+6 | 6 | 2 | 0 | 3+1 | 1 | 2 | 2 |
| 23 | MF | (Hungary) HUN | Szabolcs Huszti | 27 | 3 | 12+7 | 2 | 1+1 | 0 | 3+1 | 1 | 2 | 0 |
| 27 | MF | (Russia) RUS | Igor Denisov | 34 | 1 | 28 | 1 | 2 | 0 | 3 | 0 | 1 | 0 |
| 33 | FW | (Russia) RUS | Pavel Ignatovich | 2 | 0 | 0 | 0 | 0 | 0 | 0 | 0 | 0+2 | 0 |
| 34 | MF | (Russia) RUS | Vladimir Bystrov | 10 | 6 | 10 | 6 | 0 | 0 | 0 | 0 | 0 | 0 |
| 57 | MF | (Russia) RUS | Aleksei Ionov | 11 | 0 | 5+5 | 0 | 1 | 0 | 0 | 0 | 0 | 0 |
| 88 | FW | (Serbia) SRB | Mateja Kežman | 10 | 2 | 5+5 | 2 | 0 | 0 | 0 | 0 | 0 | 0 |
| 99 | FW | (Russia) RUS | Maksim Kanunnikov | 1 | 0 | 0+1 | 0 | 0 | 0 | 0 | 0 | 0 | 0 |
Players away from the club on loan:
Players who left Zenit St.Petersburg during the season:
| 8 | FW | (Russia) RUS | Pavel Pogrebnyak | 20 | 6 | 13+2 | 5 | 1 | 1 | 4 | 0 | 0 | 0 |
| 44 | MF | (Ukraine) UKR | Anatoliy Tymoshchuk | 13 | 2 | 8+2 | 0 | 0 | 0 | 3 | 2 | 0 | 0 |

=== Goal scorers ===
| Place | Position | Nation | Number | Name | Premier League | Russian Cup | UEFA Cup | Europa League | Total |
|---|---|---|---|---|---|---|---|---|---|
| 1 | FW | (Turkey) | 9 | Fatih Tekke | 8 | 0 | 0 | 2 | 10 |
| 2 | MF | (Russia) | 21 | Igor Semshov | 6 | 0 | 1 | 2 | 9 |
| 3 | MF | (Russia) | 34 | Vladimir Bystrov | 6 | 0 | 0 | 0 | 6 |
| 3 | FW | (Russia) | 8 | Pavel Pogrebnyak | 5 | 1 | 0 | 0 | 6 |
| 5 | MF | (Russia) | 18 | Konstantin Zyryanov | 4 | 1 | 0 | 0 | 5 |
| 6 | DF | (Croatia) | 4 | Ivica Križanac | 2 | 1 | 0 | 0 | 3 |
| 6 | MF | (Hungary) | 23 | Szabolcs Huszti | 2 | 0 | 1 | 0 | 3 |
| 6 | MF | (Italy) | 17 | Alessandro Rosina | 2 | 1 | 0 | 0 | 3 |
| 6 | | | | Own goal | 3 | 0 | 0 | 0 | 3 |
| 10 | DF | (Belgium) | 6 | Nicolas Lombaerts | 2 | 0 | 0 | 0 | 2 |
| 10 | FW | (Serbia) | 88 | Mateja Kežman | 2 | 0 | 0 | 0 | 2 |
| 10 | MF | (Ukraine) | 44 | Anatoliy Tymoshchuk | 0 | 0 | 2 | 0 | 2 |
| 13 | MF | (Portugal) | 3 | Fernando Meira | 1 | 0 | 0 | 0 | 1 |
| 13 | MF | (Russia) | 27 | Igor Denisov | 1 | 0 | 0 | 0 | 1 |
| 13 | DF | (South Korea) | 5 | Kim Dong-jin | 1 | 0 | 0 | 0 | 1 |
| 13 | DF | (Russia) | 2 | Aleksandr Anyukov | 1 | 0 | 0 | 0 | 1 |
| 13 | FW | (Belarus) | 19 | Sergei Kornilenko | 1 | 0 | 0 | 0 | 1 |
| 13 | MF | (Russia) | 15 | Roman Shirokov | 1 | 0 | 0 | 0 | 1 |
| 13 | MF | (Russia) | 20 | Viktor Fayzulin | 0 | 0 | 1 | 0 | 1 |
| | | | | TOTALS | 48 | 4 | 5 | 4 | 61 |

=== Clean sheets ===
| Place | Position | Nation | Number | Name | Premier League | Russian Cup | UEFA Cup | Europa League | Total |
|---|---|---|---|---|---|---|---|---|---|
| 1 | GK | (Russia) | 16 | Vyacheslav Malafeev | 12 | 0 | 1 | 0 | 13 |
| 1 | GK | (Slovakia) | 1 | Kamil Čontofalský | 1 | 1 | 0 | 0 | 2 |
| | | | | TOTALS | 13 | 1 | 1 | 0 | 15 |

=== Disciplinary record ===
| Number | Nation | Position | Name | Premier League | | Russian Cup | | UEFA Cup | | Europa League | | Total | |
| Number | Nation | Position | Name | Booked | Sent off (straight red) | Booked | Sent off (straight red) | Booked | Sent off (straight red) | Booked | Sent off (straight red) | Booked | Sent off (straight red) |
| 1 | (Slovakia) | GK | Kamil Čontofalský | 0 | 0 | 1 | 0 | 0 | 0 | 0 | 0 | 1 | 0 |
| 2 | (Russia) | DF | Aleksandr Anyukov | 6 | 0 | 2 | 0 | 3 | 0 | 1 | 0 | 12 | 0 |
| 3 | (Portugal) | DF | Fernando Meira | 7 | 0 | 0 | 0 | 0 | 0 | 1 | 0 | 8 | 0 |
| 4 | (Croatia) | DF | Ivica Križanac | 7 | 0 | 1 | 0 | 3 | 0 | 1 | 0 | 12 | 0 |
| 5 | (South Korea) | DF | Kim Dong-jin | 5 | 0 | 0 | 0 | 0 | 0 | 1 | 0 | 6 | 0 |
| 9 | (Turkey) | FW | Fatih Tekke | 5 | 1 | 0 | 0 | 0 | 0 | 0 | 0 | 5 | 1 |
| 10 | (Portugal) | MF | Danny | 1 | 0 | 0 | 0 | 1 | 0 | 0 | 0 | 2 | 0 |
| 11 | (Czech Republic) | MF | Radek Šírl | 2 | 0 | 0 | 0 | 1 | 0 | 0 | 0 | 3 | 0 |
| 14 | (Slovakia) | DF | Tomáš Hubočan | 2 | 0 | 0 | 0 | 0 | 0 | 0 | 0 | 2 | 0 |
| 15 | (Russia) | MF | Roman Shirokov | 0 | 0 | 1 | 0 | 2 | 1 | 1 | 0 | 4 | 1 |
| 16 | (Russia) | GK | Vyacheslav Malafeev | 1 | 0 | 0 | 0 | 0 | 0 | 0 | 0 | 1 | 0 |
| 18 | (Russia) | MF | Konstantin Zyryanov | 2 | 0 | 0 | 0 | 0 | 0 | 1 | 0 | 3 | 0 |
| 19 | (Belarus) | FW | Sergei Kornilenko | 0 | 0 | 1 | 0 | 0 | 0 | 0 | 0 | 1 | 0 |
| 20 | (Russia) | MF | Viktor Fayzulin | 2 | 0 | 0 | 0 | 0 | 0 | 0 | 0 | 2 | 0 |
| 21 | (Russia) | MF | Igor Semshov | 6 | 0 | 0 | 0 | 0 | 0 | 0 | 0 | 6 | 0 |
| 23 | (Hungary) | MF | Szabolcs Huszti | 5 | 1 | 0 | 0 | 1 | 0 | 1 | 0 | 7 | 1 |
| 27 | (Russia) | MF | Igor Denisov | 9 | 1 | 1 | 0 | 1 | 0 | 0 | 0 | 11 | 1 |
| 34 | (Russia) | MF | Vladimir Bystrov | 4 | 0 | 0 | 0 | 0 | 0 | 0 | 0 | 4 | 0 |
| 57 | (Russia) | MF | Aleksei Ionov | 1 | 0 | 1 | 0 | 0 | 0 | 0 | 0 | 2 | 0 |
| 88 | (Serbia) | FW | Mateja Kežman | 1 | 0 | 0 | 0 | 0 | 0 | 0 | 0 | 1 | 0 |
Players who left Zenit St.Petersburg during the season:
| 8 | (Russia) | FW | Pavel Pogrebnyak | 1 | 0 | 0 | 0 | 0 | 0 | 0 | 0 | 1 | 0 |
| 44 | (Ukraine) | MF | Anatoliy Tymoshchuk | 4 | 0 | 0 | 0 | 2 | 0 | 0 | 0 | 6 | 0 |
| | | | TOTALS | 71 | 3 | 8 | 0 | 14 | 1 | 7 | 0 | 100 | 4 |
