= Smena-Zenit =

Smena-Zenit may refer to:

- FC Smena-Zenit Saint Petersburg, an FC Zenit farm club dissolved in 2009
- DYuSSh Smena-Zenit, an FC Zenit youth academy
