= Nesvadba =

Nesvadba (feminine Nesvadbová) is a Czech-language surname. Notable people with the surname include:

- Bára Nesvadbová, Czech writer
- Jaroslav Nesvadba, Czech footballer
- Josef Nesvadba, Czech writer
- Josef Nesvadba (diver), Czechoslovak diver
