= Kim Dong-jin =

South Korean footballer (born 1982)

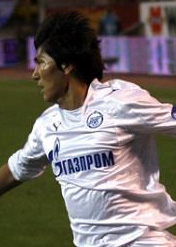
- Kim with Zenit Saint Petersburg in 2008

Personal information
- Full name: Kim Dong-jin
- Date of birth: 29 January 1982 (age 44)
- Place of birth: Dongducheon, Gyeonggi, South Korea
- Height: 1.84 m (6 ft 0 in)
- Position: Left-back

Team information
- Current team: South Korea (coach)

Youth career
- 1997–1999: Anyang Technical High School

Senior career*
Years	Team	Apps	(Gls)
2000–2006	FC Seoul	99	(12)
2006–2009	Zenit Saint Petersburg	68	(3)
2010	Ulsan Hyundai	22	(0)
2011	FC Seoul	9	(1)
2012–2013	Hangzhou Greentown	55	(2)
2014–2015	Muangthong United	58	(2)
2016	Seoul E-Land	34	(1)
2017–2019	Kitchee	11	(1)
2018	→ Hoi King (loan)	5	(0)
Total		361	(22)

International career
1998	South Korea U17	6	(2)
1999–2000	South Korea U20	10	(0)
2002–2008	South Korea U23	43 (Note: Includes one appearance against non-national team, and six appearances and one goal as an overage player (three appearances and one goal in Summer Olympics, one appearance in Asian Games, two appearances in friendlies).)	(6)
2003–2010	South Korea	62	(2)

Managerial career
- 2019–2024: Kitchee (assistant, caretaker)
Medal record
Men's football
Representing South Korea
AFC Asian Cup
Bronze medal – third place	2007 Indonesia/Malaysia /Thailand/Vietnam
Asian Games
Bronze medal – third place	2002 Busan
EAFF Championship
Gold medal – first place	2003 Japan
- * Club domestic league appearances and goals

- Kim Dong-jin
- Hangul: 김동진
- Hanja: 金東進
- RR: Gim Dongjin
- MR: Kim Tongjin

Kim Dong-jin (born 29 January 1982) is a South Korean football coach and a former professional footballer who played as a left full-back or wing-back. He is currently a coach of the South Korea national football team.

== Club career ==
Kim started his professional career in Anyang LG Cheetahs (FC Seoul before 2004) in 2000, and spent his prime with them before joining Zenit Saint Petersburg. On 28 June 2006, he transferred to Zenit, following coach Dick Advocaat and Korean teammate Lee Ho. During his second season in Zenit, he helped his team to achieve their first Russian Premier League title by showing outstanding performance, and was named the second best left-back of the Russian Football Union. However, he couldn't show his ability after suffering a leg injury in the middle of the next season. Furthermore, he had a sudden problem with the blood circulation of his brain, and Zenit finally terminated his contract on 26 January 2010. He moved to Ulsan Hyundai and FC Seoul after other medical check-ups that found he was healthy enough to play, but he couldn't settle there.

On 24 July 2019, Kim played Kitchee's friendly against Manchester City until being substituted in the 15th minute, and was handed a City shirt by Man City manager Pep Guardiola as strolling off the pitch. After the match, Kim retired from playing career, and became a coach of Kitchee.

== International career ==
He was South Korea's left midfielder in the 2004 Summer Olympics, and helped Korea finish second in Group A by scoring one goal (against Greece) and two assists (both against Mali), consequently advancing to the next round. However, they were stopped by the silver medalist Paraguay.

In 2004, Kim's performance against Germany while under Jo Bonfrère secured him the left-back or left midfield position (depending on the formation that was usually 4–3–3 or 3–4–3), which originally belonged to Lee Young-pyo. However, as Advocaat became the new manager of South Korea in November 2005, both Lee and Kim had to compete for the position. Since the two players proved to be highly influential to the national team, both players were rotated for the left back position during 2006 FIFA World Cup.

During the 2008 Summer Olympics, he was summoned to join South Korean under-23 squad as an over-aged player. Despite his solid performance and a winning goal scored in the last game against Honduras, his team was eliminated in the first round.

== Managerial career ==
On 29 September 2023, Kim was appointed as the interim head coach of Kitchee.

== Career statistics ==
=== Club ===
Appearances and goals by club, season and competition
Club	Season	League			National cup		League cup		Continental		Total	
Club	Season	Division	Apps	Goals	Apps	Goals	Apps	Goals	Apps	Goals	Apps	Goals
FC Seoul	2000	K League	4	0	2	0	3	1	2	0	11	1
FC Seoul	2001	K League	5	0	0	0	1	0	0	0	6	0
FC Seoul	2002	K League	3	0	0	0	5	0	4	0	12	0
FC Seoul	2003	K League	35	5	1	0	—		—		36	5
FC Seoul	2004	K League	18	3	2	0	0	0	—		20	3
FC Seoul	2005	K League	21	3	2	0	11	0	—		34	3
FC Seoul	2006	K League	13	1	1	0	0	0	—		14	1
FC Seoul	Total		99	12	8	0	20	1	6	0	133	13
Zenit Saint Petersburg	2006	Russian Premier League	17	0	0	0	—		—		17	0
Zenit Saint Petersburg	2007	Russian Premier League	24	2	4	0	—		8	2	36	4
Zenit Saint Petersburg	2008	Russian Premier League	10	0	0	0	—		4	0	14	0
Zenit Saint Petersburg	2009	Russian Premier League	17	1	1	0	—		3	0	21	1
Zenit Saint Petersburg	Total		68	3	5	0	—		15	2	88	5
Ulsan Hyundai	2010	K League	22	0	1	0	1	0	—		24	0
FC Seoul	2011	K League	9	1	1	0	0	0	4	0	14	1
Hangzhou Greentown	2012	Chinese Super League	27	1	2	0	—		—		29	1
Hangzhou Greentown	2013	Chinese Super League	28	1	0	0	—		—		28	1
Hangzhou Greentown	Total		55	2	2	0	—		—		57	2
Muangthong United	2014	Thai Premier League	31	2	?	?	?	?	0	0	31	2
Muangthong United	2015	Thai Premier League	27	0	?	?	?	?	—		27	0
Muangthong United	Total		58	2	?	?	?	?	0	0	58	2
Seoul E-Land	2016	K League 2	34	1	?	?	—		—		34	1
Kitchee	2016–17	Hong Kong Premier League	4	0	?	?	—		0	0	4	0
Kitchee	2017–18	Hong Kong Premier League	7	1	?	?	—		0	0	7	1
Kitchee	Total		11	1	?	?	—		0	0	11	1
Hoi King (loan)	2018–19	Hong Kong Premier League	5	0	?	?	—		—		5	0
Career total			361	22	17	0	21	1	25	2	424	25

=== International ===
Results list South Korea's goal tally first.

List of international goals scored by Kim Dong-jin
No.	Date	Venue	Opponent	Score	Result	Competition
1	19 December 2004	Busan Asiad Main Stadium, Busan, South Korea	Germany	1–0	3–1	Friendly
2	29 January 2006	Hong Kong Stadium, Hong Kong	Croatia	1–0	2–0	2006 Lunar New Year Cup

== Honours ==
=== Player ===
FC Seoul

- K League 1: 2000
- Korean League Cup: 2006
- Korean Super Cup: 2001

Zenit Saint Petersburg

- UEFA Cup: 2007–08
- UEFA Super Cup: 2008
- Russian Premier League: 2007
- Russian Super Cup: 2008

Muangthong United

- Thai FA Cup runner-up: 2015

Kitchee

- Hong Kong Premier League: 2016–17, 2017–18
- Hong Kong FA Cup: 2016–17, 2017–18
- Hong Kong Senior Challenge Shield: 2016–17
- Hong Kong Sapling Cup: 2017–18
- Hong Kong Community Cup: 2017

South Korea U23

- Asian Games bronze medal: 2002

South Korea

- AFC Asian Cup third place: 2007
- EAFF Championship: 2003

Individual

- K League All-Star: 2004, 2005
- K League 1 Best XI: 2004

=== Manager ===
Kitchee

- Hong Kong Senior Challenge Shield: 2023–24
- HKPLC Cup: 2023–24
