= Artyom Kulesha =

Russian footballer

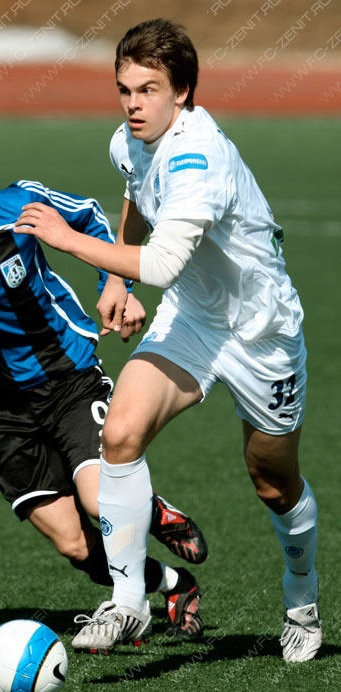

Personal information
- Full name: Artyom Pavlovich Kulesha
- Date of birth: 14 January 1990 (age 36)
- Place of birth: Leningrad, Russian SFSR
- Height: 1.92 m (6 ft 4 in)
- Positions: Midfielder; defender

Youth career
- –2005: Rubin St. Petersburg
- 2005–2008: Smena St. Petersburg

Senior career*
Years	Team	Apps	(Gls)
2007–2008	Zenit St. Petersburg	0	(0)
2009	→ Smena-Zenit St. Petersburg	11	(0)
2009–2013	Rubin Kazan	0	(0)
2011	→ Rostov (loan)	3	(0)
2013–2014	Dynamo St. Petersburg	10	(0)
2015	Znamya Truda	8	(0)
2015–2016	Ocean Kerch		
2016	Yunior St. Petersburg		
2017	Kultsu	11	(0)
2019	Buxoro	6	(0)
2021	Neftchi Kochkor-Ata	3	(0)
2021	Maktaaral	9	(1)

International career
2010–2021	Russia U-21	4	(0)
- * Club domestic league appearances and goals

Artyom Pavlovich Kulesha (Russian: Артём Павлович Кулеша; born 14 January 1990) is a Russian former professional footballer.

== Career ==
Kulesha was registered as a defender for Zenit in the 2008 season. However, he never made it to the first team and played just four times for the reserves. In 2009 Kulesha made his professional debut in the Russian Second Division for Zenit feeder team FC Smena-Zenit St. Petersburg, and in August 2009 he signed a contract with FC Rubin Kazan.
