= Roman Nagumanov =

Russian footballer

Personal information
- Full name: Roman Rafailovich Nagumanov
- Date of birth: 5 June 1985 (age 41)
- Place of birth: Leningrad, Russian SFSR
- Height: 1.78 m (5 ft 10 in)
- Position: Midfielder

Youth career
- DYuSSh Smena-Zenit

Senior career*
Years	Team	Apps	(Gls)
2002	SDYuShOR Zenit Saint Petersburg		
2003–2005	FC Zenit-2 St. Petersburg	60	(3)
2005	FC Metallurg-Kuzbass Novokuznetsk	12	(2)
2006	FC Saturn Ramenskoye	0	(0)
2006	FC Zenit-2 St. Petersburg	2	(1)
2007–2009	FC Metallurg-Kuzbass Novokuznetsk	73	(6)
2010	Daugava/RFS Riga	9	(0)
2010	VMFD Žalgiris Vilnius	12	(1)
2011–2014	FC Zvezda Saint Petersburg (amateur)		
- * Club domestic league appearances and goals

Roman Rafailovich Nagumanov (Russian: Роман Рафаилович Нагуманов; born 5 June 1985) is a former Russian professional football player.

== Club career ==
He played 3 seasons in the Russian Football National League for FC Metallurg-Kuzbass Novokuznetsk.

== Personal life ==
His younger brother Andrei Nagumanov is also a footballer.
