= Andrei Nagumanov =

Russian footballer

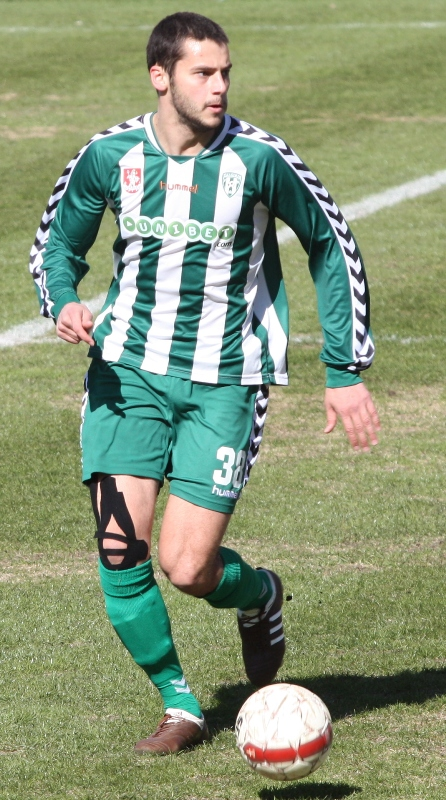
- Nagumanov with Žalgiris Vilnius

Personal information
- Full name: Andrei Rafailovich Nagumanov
- Date of birth: 21 February 1987 (age 39)
- Place of birth: Leningrad, Russian SFSR
- Height: 1.87 m (6 ft 2 in)
- Position: Midfielder

Youth career
- Primorets Saint Petersburg
- DYuSSh Smena-Zenit

Senior career*
| Years | Team | Apps | (Gls) |
| 2004–2006 | Zenit Saint Petersburg | 0 | (0) |
| 2007 | Tekstilshchik-Telekom Ivanovo | 32 | (4) |
| 2008 | Sportakademklub Moscow | 24 | (1) |
| 2009 | FC Smena-Zenit Saint Petersburg | 22 | (5) |
| 2010–2012 | FK Žalgiris Vilnius | 73 | (11) |
| 2013 | TSG Öhringen | | |
| 2013–2014 | FSV Hollenbach | | |
| 2014–2016 | TSV Crailsheim | | |
| 2016–2018 | TSV Ilshofen | | |

International career
| 2004 | Russia U17 | 8 | (2) |
| 2005 | Russia U18 | 4 | (0) |
| 2006 | Russia U19 | 6 | (1) |
| 2007 | Russia U21 | 5 | (0) |

Managerial career
- 2018–2020: TSV Obersontheim (player-manager)
- 2021–2022: TSG Öhringen (player-assistant)
- * Club domestic league appearances and goals

Andrei Rafailovich Nagumanov (Russian: Андрей Рафаилович Нагуманов; born 21 February 1987) is a Russian former professional football player.

== Club career ==
Nagumanov made his debut for Zenit Saint Petersburg on 20 September 2006 in a Russian Cup game against FC Chita.

He played two seasons in the Russian Football National League for Tekstilshchik-Telekom Ivanovo and Sportakademklub Moscow.

In the latter part of his career he moved to Germany, where his wife is from, and played for fifth-tier Oberliga Baden-Württemberg teams.

== Personal life ==
His older brother Roman Nagumanov is also a footballer.
