= Nikita Kolesnikov =

Russian footballer

Personal information
- Full name: Nikita Sergeyevich Kolesnikov
- Date of birth: 12 August 1988 (age 38)
- Place of birth: Leningrad, Russian SFSR
- Height: 1.84 m (6 ft 1/2 in)
- Position: Midfielder

Youth career
- DSSh Petrogradsky Rayon Saint Petersburg
- FC Dynamo Saint Petersburg

Senior career*
Years	Team	Apps	(Gls)
2007–2009	FC Zenit Saint Petersburg	0	(0)
2009	→ FC Smena-Zenit Saint Petersburg (loan)	18	(4)
2010	FC Dynamo Saint Petersburg	14	(1)
2011–2012	FC Rus Saint Petersburg (amateur)		
- * Club domestic league appearances and goals

Nikita Sergeyevich Kolesnikov (Russian: Никита Серге́евич Колесников; born 12 August 1988) is a former Russian professional football player.

== Club career ==
He played in the Russian Football National League for FC Dynamo Saint Petersburg in 2010.

== Personal life ==
He is a son of FC Zenit masseur Sergey Kolesnikov.
