= Sergei Kostin =

Russian footballer

Personal information
- Full name: Sergei Yuryevich Kostin
- Date of birth: 15 June 1991 (age 35)
- Place of birth: Saint Petersburg, Russian SFSR
- Height: 1.92 m (6 ft 4 in)
- Position: Defender

Youth career
- –2011: FC Zenit Saint Petersburg

Senior career*
Years	Team	Apps	(Gls)
2012–2013	FC Petrotrest Saint Petersburg	40	(0)
2013	FC Dynamo Saint Petersburg	13	(0)
2014	PFC Spartak Nalchik	11	(0)
2014	FC Sokol Saratov	6	(0)
2015–2018	FC Tekstilshchik Ivanovo	77	(8)
2018–2024	FC Leningradets Leningrad Oblast	112	(6)

International career
2010	Russia U-19	5	(0)
2011	Russia U-20	3	(0)
- * Club domestic league appearances and goals

Sergei Yuryevich Kostin (Russian: Серге́й Юрьевич Костин; born 15 June 1991) is a Russian former football defender.

== Club career ==
Kostin made his debut in the Russian Second Division for FC Petrotrest Saint Petersburg on 22 April 2012 in a game against FC Sheksna Cherepovets.

He made his Russian Football National League debut for FC Petrotrest Saint Petersburg on 9 July 2012 in a game against FC Ural Yekaterinburg.
