= German Pyatnikov =

Russian footballer

Personal information
- Full name: German Dmitriyevich Pyatnikov
- Date of birth: 23 January 1988 (age 38)
- Place of birth: Leningrad, Soviet Union
- Height: 1.68 m (5 ft 6 in)
- Positions: Forward; midfielder

Senior career*
Years	Team	Apps	(Gls)
2005–2010	FC Zenit St. Petersburg	0	(0)
2009	→ FC Smena-Zenit St. Petersburg (loan)	32	(4)
2010	→ FC Lokomotiv-2 Moscow (loan)	28	(3)
2011	FC Sfîntul Gheorghe	12	(3)
2011–2012	FC Nistru Otaci	9	(2)
2013	FC Karelia Petrozavodsk	5	(0)
- * Club domestic league appearances and goals

German Dmitriyevich Pyatnikov (Russian: Герман Дмитриевич Пятников; born 23 January 1988) is a former Russian professional football player.

== Career ==
Born in Leningrad, Pyatnikov began playing football in the FC Smena-Zenit youth academy. He would later join FC Zenit Saint Petersburg, but never broke into the first team. Pyatnikov played on loan for Smena-Zenit in the Russian Second Division before leaving the parent club Zenit.

Pyatnikov tried to resurrect his career by moving to Moldova, where he played for six months with FC Sfîntul Gheorghe. He would join FC Nistru Otaci on another short-term deal later in 2011.
