= Aleksandr Yevstafyev =

Russian footballer

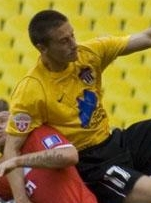

Personal information
- Full name: Aleksandr Andreyevich Yevstafyev
- Date of birth: 15 January 1985 (age 41)
- Height: 1.80 m (5 ft 11 in)
- Position: Midfielder

Youth career
- FC Zenit St. Petersburg

Senior career*
Years	Team	Apps	(Gls)
2003–2004	FC Zenit-2 St. Petersburg	62	(10)
2005–2006	FC Zenit St. Petersburg	0	(0)
2006–2008	FC Khimki	41	(6)
2008	→ FC Baltika Kaliningrad (loan)	19	(2)
2009	FC Nosta Novotroitsk	32	(3)
2010	FC Khimki	11	(2)
2010	FC Dynamo Saint Petersburg	14	(1)
2011	FC Tyumen	19	(1)
2012–2013	FC Rus Saint Petersburg	40	(10)
- * Club domestic league appearances and goals

Aleksandr Andreyevich Yevstafyev (Russian: Александр Андреевич Евстафьев; born 15 January 1985) is a Russian former footballer.

== Club career ==
In 2006, he became Russian First Division winner playing for FC Khimki.
