= Anatoli Agrofenin =

Russian footballer and manager (born 1980)

Personal information
- Full name: Anatoli Alekseyevich Agrofenin
- Date of birth: 6 November 1980 (age 45)
- Place of birth: Vladivostok, Russian SFSR
- Height: 1.84 m (6 ft 1/2 in)
- Positions: Defender; midfielder

Senior career*
Years	Team	Apps	(Gls)
1998–2004	FC Luch-Energiya Vladivostok	111	(19)
2005	FC Zvezda Irkutsk	26	(2)
2006	FC Chita	13	(1)
2007	FC Amur Blagoveshchensk	14	(3)
2008–2009	FC Chita	52	(5)
2010	FC Mostovik-Primorye Ussuriysk	18	(0)
2010	FC Radian-Baikal Irkutsk	9	(1)
2011–2012	FC Sakhalin Yuzhno-Sakhalinsk	22	(4)

Managerial career
- 2013–2017: FC Luch-Energiya-M Vladivostok
- 2017–2020: FC Luch Vladivostok (assistant)
- * Club domestic league appearances and goals

Anatoli Alekseyevich Agrofenin (Russian: Анатолий Алексеевич Агрофенин; born 6 November 1980) is a Russian professional football coach and a former player.

== Club career ==
He played in the Russian Football National League for FC Chita in 2009.
