= Viktor Bolikhov =

Russian footballer

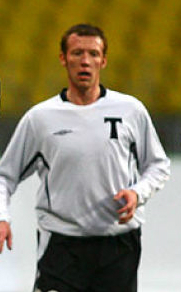
- Viktor Bolikhov in 2006

Personal information
- Full name: Viktor Viktorovich Bolikhov
- Date of birth: 1 December 1983 (age 42)
- Place of birth: Pogoreloye Gorodishche, Russian SFSR
- Height: 1.82 m (5 ft 11 1/2 in)
- Position: Midfielder

Senior career*
Years	Team	Apps	(Gls)
2000	FC Torpedo-2 Moscow	5	(0)
2001–2006	FC Torpedo Moscow	23	(1)
2005	→ FC Anzhi Makhachkala (loan)	24	(1)
2007	FC Lobnya-Alla Lobnya	19	(0)
2008–2009	FC Zvezda Serpukhov	42	(4)
2010	FC Znamya Truda Orekhovo-Zuyevo	13	(0)

International career
2004	Russia U-21	3	(0)
- * Club domestic league appearances and goals

Viktor Viktorovich Bolikhov (Russian: Виктор Викторович Болихов; born 1 December 1983) is a Russian former professional footballer.

== Club career ==
He made his debut in the Russian Premier League in 2002 for FC Torpedo Moscow.
