= Lee Ho (footballer, born 1984) =

South Korean footballer

Personal information
- Date of birth: 22 October 1984 (age 42)
- Place of birth: Seoul, South Korea
- Height: 1.83 m (6 ft 0 in)
- Positions: Defensive midfielder; centre-back

Team information
- Current team: Incheon United (assistant)

Youth career
- 2000–2002: Joongdong High School

Senior career*
| Years | Team | Apps | (Gls) |
| 2003–2006 | Ulsan Hyundai Horang-i | 60 | (4) |
| 2006–2008 | Zenit Saint Petersburg | 18 | (1) |
| 2009 | Seongnam Ilhwa Chunma | 28 | (2) |
| 2010 | Al Ain FC | 23 | (0) |
| 2010 | Omiya Ardija | 15 | (1) |
| 2011–2014 | Ulsan Hyundai | 68 | (1) |
| 2013–2014 | → Sangju Sangmu (army) | 49 | (2) |
| 2015–2016 | Jeonbuk Hyundai | 22 | (0) |
| 2017–2019 | Muangthong United | 50 | (1) |
| 2020 | Ayutthaya United | 13 | (1) |
| 2021–2022 | Ulsan Hyundai | 1 | (0) |
| Total | | 347 | (13) |

International career
| 2003 | South Korea U-20 | 7 | (0) |
| 2006 | South Korea U-23 | 5 | (1) |
| 2005–2014 | South Korea | 26 | (0) |

Managerial career
- 2023–2024: Seoul E-Land FC (assistant)
- 2025–: Incheon United (assistant)
- * Club domestic league appearances and goals

- Lee Ho
- Hangul: 이호
- Hanja: 李浩
- RR: I Ho
- MR: I Ho

Lee Ho (Korean: 이호; born 22 October 1984) is a South Korean football coach and a former player. He is an assistant coach of K League 2 club Incheon United.

== Career ==
He signed for Zenit Saint Petersburg on 30 June 2006, two days after Kim Dong-Jin, following their coach Dick Advocaat.

=== Al Ain FC ===
Prior to the January transfer window opening Al Ain were in search for an Asian foreign player to play alongside non-Asians Jorge Valdivia, Emerson and Jose Sand. Rumours began to flow that Lee was the Emirati club's main transfer target.

On 18 January, Lee was presented to the press with the number 50 and officially announced as the fourth foreign player in Al Ain's squad with a contract until the end of the season with an option to renew for another year.

=== Ulsan Hyundai ===
For the 2021 season, Lee Ho returned to Ulsan Hyundai as a playing coach and retired at the end of 2022 season.

== Managerial career ==
Lee Ho joined Seoul E-Land FC as an assistant coach.

== International ==
He played in all three of South Korea's games at the 2006 World Cup in Germany.

== Personal life ==
In 2009, Lee Ho married Yang Eun-ji, who was a member of Baby Vox Re.V and is a sister of actress Yang Mi-ra. Lee Ho and Yang Eun-ji have three daughters.

== Career statistics ==
=== Club ===
Appearances and goals by club, season and competition
| Club | Season | League | | | Cup | | League Cup | | Continental | | Total | |
| Club | Season | Division | Apps | Goals | Apps | Goals | Apps | Goals | Apps | Goals | Apps | Goals |
|---|---|---|---|---|---|---|---|---|---|---|---|---|
| Ulsan Hyundai Horang-i | 2003 | K League 1 | 9 | 1 | 0 | 0 | — | | — | | 9 | 1 |
| Ulsan Hyundai Horang-i | 2004 | K League 1 | 19 | 1 | 4 | 0 | 10 | 0 | — | | 33 | 1 |
| Ulsan Hyundai Horang-i | 2005 | K League 1 | 25 | 1 | 1 | 0 | 11 | 0 | — | | 37 | 1 |
| Ulsan Hyundai Horang-i | 2006 | K League 1 | 7 | 1 | 1 | 0 | 0 | 0 | 0 | 0 | 8 | 1 |
| Ulsan Hyundai Horang-i | Total | | 60 | 4 | 6 | 0 | 21 | 0 | 0 | 0 | 87 | 4 |
| Zenit Saint Petersburg | 2006 | Russian Premier League | 18 | 1 | 1 | 0 | — | | — | | 19 | 1 |
| Zenit Saint Petersburg | 2007 | Russian Premier League | 0 | 0 | 4 | 0 | — | | 4 | 0 | 8 | 0 |
| Zenit Saint Petersburg | 2008 | Russian Premier League | 0 | 0 | 1 | 0 | — | | 0 | 0 | 1 | 0 |
| Zenit Saint Petersburg | Total | | 18 | 1 | 6 | 0 | — | | 4 | 0 | 28 | 1 |
| Seongnam Ilhwa Chunma | 2009 | K League 1 | 28 | 2 | 5 | 0 | 7 | 0 | — | | 40 | 2 |
| Al Ain FC | 2009–10 | UAE Football League | 23 | 0 | 7 | 0 | 0 | 0 | 5 | 0 | 35 | 0 |
| Omiya Ardija | 2010 | J. League | 14 | 1 | 0 | 0 | 0 | 0 | — | | 14 | 1 |
| Ulsan Hyundai | 2011 | K League 1 | 33 | 0 | 1 | 1 | 7 | 0 | — | | 41 | 1 |
| Ulsan Hyundai | 2012 | K League 1 | 30 | 0 | 2 | 0 | — | | 10 | 0 | 42 | 0 |
| Ulsan Hyundai | 2014 | K League 1 | 10 | 1 | — | | — | | — | | 10 | 1 |
| Ulsan Hyundai | Total | | 73 | 1 | 3 | 1 | 7 | 0 | 10 | 0 | 93 | 2 |
| Sangju Sangmu (army) | 2013 | K League 1 | 32 | 0 | 1 | 0 | — | | — | | 33 | 0 |
| Sangju Sangmu (army) | 2014 | K League 1 | 17 | 2 | 0 | 0 | — | | — | | 17 | 2 |
| Sangju Sangmu (army) | Total | | 49 | 2 | 1 | 0 | — | | — | | 50 | 2 |
| Jeonbuk Hyundai | 2015 | K League 1 | 11 | 0 | 0 | 0 | — | | 2 | 0 | 13 | 0 |
| Jeonbuk Hyundai | 2016 | K League 1 | 11 | 0 | 1 | 0 | — | | 1 | 0 | 13 | 0 |
| Jeonbuk Hyundai | Total | | 22 | 0 | 1 | 0 | — | | 3 | 0 | 26 | 0 |
| Muangthong United | 2017 | Thai League 1 | 19 | 0 | 2 | 0 | 2 | 0 | 7 | 0 | 30 | 0 |
| Muangthong United | 2018 | Thai League 1 | 17 | 1 | 3 | 0 | 2 | 0 | 2 | 0 | 24 | 1 |
| Muangthong United | 2019 | Thai League 1 | 14 | 0 | 1 | 0 | 1 | 0 | — | | 16 | 0 |
| Muangthong United | Total | | 50 | 1 | 6 | 0 | 5 | 0 | 9 | 0 | 70 | 1 |
| Ayutthaya United | 2020–21 | Thai League 2 | 13 | 1 | 0 | 0 | 0 | 0 | — | | 13 | 1 |
| Ulsan Hyundai | 2022 | K League 1 | 1 | 0 | 0 | 0 | — | | 0 | 0 | 1 | 0 |
| Career total | | | 351 | 13 | 36 | 1 | 40 | 0 | 31 | 0 | 458 | 14 |

=== International ===
As of match played 1 February 2014

| National team | Year | Apps | Goals |
|---|---|---|---|
| South Korea | 2005 | 2 | 0 |
| South Korea | 2006 | 15 | 0 |
| South Korea | 2007 | 6 | 0 |
| South Korea | 2008 | 1 | 0 |
| South Korea | 2014 | 2 | 0 |
| Total | | 26 | 0 |

== Honours ==
Ulsan Hyundai

- K League 1 (1): 2005
- K-League Cup (1): 2011
- Korean Super Cup (1): 2006
- AFC Champions League (1): 2012
- A3 Champions Cup (1): 2006

Zenit Saint Petersburg

- UEFA Cup (1): 2007–08

Jeonbuk Hyundai Motors

- AFC Champions League (1): 2016

Muangthong United

- Thai League Cup (1): 2017
- Mekong Club Championship (1): 2017
