= Jaroslav Nesvadba =

Czech footballer (born 1982)

Personal information
- Date of birth: 5 May 1982 (age 44)
- Place of birth: Czechoslovakia
- Height: 1.86 m (6 ft 1 in)
- Position: Defender

Team information
- Current team: FK Jiskra Mšeno

Youth career
- FK Jablonec 97

Senior career*
Years	Team	Apps	(Gls)
2004–2005	FK Jablonec 97	39	(1)
2006–2007	Zenit St. Petersburg	1	(0)
2006–2007	→ Mladá Boleslav (loan)	5	(0)
2008	Inter Zaprešić	6	(0)
2008	Slovan Varnsdorf		
2009	FC Zlín B		
2010	Baník Most	14	(1)
2010–2014	Spartak Sezimovo Ústí	15	(3)
2014–2016	SK Semily		
2016–2023	FK Přepeře		
2024–	FK Jiskra Mšeno		
- * Club domestic league appearances and goals as of 28 March 2011

Jaroslav Nesvadba (born 5 May 1982) is a Czech footballer who plays for FK Jiskra Mšeno.

Nesvadba previously played in the Czech Gambrinus liga with FK Jablonec 97 and FK Mladá Boleslav. He had a brief spells in the Russian Premier League with FC Zenit Saint Petersburg, where he played for their reserves, and the Croatian First League with NK Inter Zaprešić.
