= FC Smena-Zenit =

Russian football club

- Full name: Football Club Smena-Zenit
- Founded: 2008
- Dissolved: 2009
- Ground: Petrovsky Stadium, Saint Petersburg
- Capacity: 21,570
- Chairman: Vasili Kostrovsky
- Manager: Vladimir Kazachyonok
- League: Russian Second Division
- 2009: 16th
Home colours	Away colours

FC Smena-Zenit (Russian: ФК «Смена-Зенит») was a Russian football club from Saint Petersburg, founded in 2008. It played one season in 2009 in the Russian Second Division as the farm-club of FC Zenit. After the 2009 season, FC Zenit decided to dissolve the club as not fulfilling the expectations.
