= 2005 FC Moscow season =

Moscow
2005 season
- Manager: Valery Petrakov (Until July 2005); Leonid Slutsky (from July 2005)
- Stadium: Eduard Streltsov Stadium
- Premier League: 5th
- Russian Cup: Round of 16 vs CSKA Moscow
- Russian Cup: Progressed to 2006 season
- Top goalscorer: League: Dmitri Kirichenko (14); All: Dmitri Kirichenko (14)

The 2005 FC Moscow season was the club's 2nd season in existence after taking over the licence of Torpedo-Metallurg in 2004. They finished the season in 5th place, qualifying for the UEFA Intertoto Cup for the first time. In the 2004–05 Russian Cup, Moscow reached the Round of 16, whilst in the 2005–06 Russian Cup they progressed to the Round of 16 which took place during the 2006 season.

== Squad ==
As of match played 19 November 2005

No.	Name	Nationality	Position	Date of birth (age)	Signed from	Signed in	Contract ends	Apps.	Goals
Goalkeepers
1	Aleksandr Filimonov	(Russia)	GK	15 October 1973 (aged 32)	Uralan Elista	2004		27	0
12	Sergei Kozko	(Russia)	GK	12 April 1975 (aged 30)	Rubin Kazan	2005	2007	4	0
30	Yuri Zhevnov	(Belarus)	GK	17 April 1981 (aged 24)	BATE Borisov	2005		30	0
Defenders
2	Dmitri Godunok	(Russia)	DF	4 January 1976 (aged 29)	Tom Tomsk	2005		28	1
8	Pompiliu Stoica	(Romania)	DF	10 September 1976 (aged 29)	Steaua București	2004		40	0
22	Oleg Kuzmin	(Russia)	DF	9 May 1981 (aged 24)	Uralan Elista	2004		38	4
25	Mariusz Jop	(Poland)	DF	3 August 1978 (aged 27)	Wisła Kraków	2004		45	4
31	Mikhail Bagayev	(Russia)	DF	28 February 1985 (aged 20)	Dynamo Kirov	2005		1	0
32	Kirill Nababkin	(Russia)	DF	8 September 1986 (aged 19)	Youth Team	2004		9	0
33	Andrei Lukanchenkov	(Russia)	DF	7 February 1986 (aged 19)	Torpedo-Metallurg	2004		2	0
39	Aleksandr Sukhov	(Russia)	DF	3 January 1986 (aged 19)	Youth Team	2004		1	0
41	Andrei Moiseyenkov	(Russia)	DF	5 January 1987 (aged 18)	Youth Team	2005		1	0
43	Pyotr Marshinskiy	(Russia)	DF	18 February 1986 (aged 19)	Youth Team	2005		1	0
44	Aleksandr Ponomaryov	(Russia)	DF	25 January 1986 (aged 19)	Dynamo Moscow	2005		0	0
45	Vyacheslav Lyskin	(Russia)	DF	4 July 1986 (aged 19)	Youth Team	2005		0	0
99	Jerry-Christian Tchuissé	(Cameroon)	DF	13 January 1975 (aged 30)	Chernomorets Novorossiysk	2004		55	2
Midfielders
5	Radu Rebeja	(Moldova)	MF	8 June 1973 (aged 32)	Saturn Ramenskoye	2004		59	3
7	Damian Gorawski	(Poland)	MF	4 January 1979 (aged 26)	Wisła Kraków	2005		21	1
13	Maksym Biletskyi	(Ukraine)	MF	7 January 1980 (aged 25)	Torpedo-Metallurg	2004		39	0
20	Aleksei Melyoshin	(Russia)	MF	30 January 1976 (aged 29)	Dynamo St.Petersburg	2004		57	10
34	Vyacheslav Danilin	(Russia)	MF	14 March 1984 (aged 21)	Torpedo-Metallurg	2004		10	2
36	Ivan Bakulin	(Russia)	MF	16 April 1986 (aged 19)	Torpedo-Metallurg	2004		1	0
37	Sergei Korobov	(Russia)	MF	18 January 1986 (aged 19)	Youth Team	2004		0	0
42	Pavel Golyshev	(Russia)	MF	7 July 1987 (aged 18)	Youth Team	2005		3	1
50	Aleksandr Ryazantsev	(Russia)	MF	5 September 1986 (aged 19)	Youth Team	2004		2	0
77	Stanislav Ivanov	(Moldova)	MF	7 October 1980 (aged 25)	Sheriff Tiraspol	2004		45	2
Forwards
10	Dmitri Kirichenko	(Russia)	FW	17 January 1977 (aged 28)	CSKA Moscow	2005		26	14
17	Stanton Fredericks	(South Africa)	FW	13 June 1977 (aged 28)	Kaizer Chiefs	2004		17	1
19	Héctor Bracamonte	(Argentina)	FW	16 February 1978 (aged 27)	Boca Juniors	2004		57	16
23	Viktor Zemchenkov	(Russia)	FW	15 September 1986 (aged 19)	Youth Team	2004		2	0
27	Andrey Movsisyan	(Armenia)	FW	27 October 1975 (aged 30)	Torpedo-Metallurg	2004		23	3
35	Dmitry Golubov	(Russia)	FW	24 June 1985 (aged 20)	Tekstilshchik Kamyshin	2005		8	3
49	Aleksandr Borodkin	(Russia)	FW	12 October 1984 (aged 21)	Youth Team	2004		0	0
Away on loan
14	Ruslan Baltiev	(Kazakhstan)	MF	16 September 1978 (aged 27)	Dynamo Moscow	2004		33	2
15	Valeri Leonov	(Russia)	MF	17 September 1980 (aged 25)	Torpedo-Metallurg	2004		13	0
40	Sergei Sharin	(Russia)	MF	5 August 1984 (aged 21)	Torpedo-Metallurg	2004		0	0
88	Andrei Nikolayev	(Russia)	FW	30 August 1982 (aged 23)	Zenit St.Petersburg	2004		13	3
	Cristian Tudor	(Romania)	FW	23 August 1982 (aged 23)	Sheriff Tiraspol	2004		5	0
Players that left Moscow during the season
3	Rolandas Džiaukštas	(Lithuania)	DF	1 April 1978 (aged 27)	Torpedo-Metallurg	2004		28	0
11	Budun Budunov	(Russia)	FW	4 December 1975 (aged 29)	Anzhi Makhachkala	2004		36	7
16	Maksim Klikin	(Russia)	GK	30 April 1981 (aged 24)	Arsenal Tula	2005		0	0
18	Kirill Orlov	(Russia)	DF	18 January 1983 (aged 22)	Torpedo-Metallurg	2004		25	0
28	Baba Adamu	(Ghana)	FW	20 September 1979 (aged 26)	Al-Nasr	2004		21	5
38	Andrei Kordun	(Russia)	FW	7 December 1985 (aged 19)	Youth Team	2004		1	0
83	Rinat Yesipenko	(Ukraine)	GK	22 October 1983 (aged 22)	Shakhtar Donetsk	2004		0	0

=== On loan ===
Note: Flags indicate national team as defined under FIFA eligibility rules; some limited exceptions apply. Players may hold more than one non-FIFA nationality.

No.	Pos.	Nation	Player
14	MF	KAZ	Ruslan Baltiev (at Shinnik Yaroslavl)
15	MF	RUS	Valeri Leonov (at Tom Tomsk)
40	MF	RUS	Sergei Sharin (at Chkalovets-1936 Novosibirsk)

No.	Pos.	Nation	Player
88	FW	RUS	Andrei Nikolayev (at Metallurg-Kuzbass Novokuznetsk)
—	FW	ROU	Cristian Tudor (at Alania Vladikavkaz)

=== Left club during season ===
Note: Flags indicate national team as defined under FIFA eligibility rules; some limited exceptions apply. Players may hold more than one non-FIFA nationality.

No.	Pos.	Nation	Player
3	DF	LTU	Rolandas Džiaukštas (to Saturn Ramenskoye)
11	FW	RUS	Budun Budunov (to Tom Tomsk)
16	GK	RUS	Maksim Klikin (to Metallurg-Kuzbass Novokuznetsk)
18	DF	RUS	Kirill Orlov (to Rostov)

No.	Pos.	Nation	Player
28	FW	GHA	Baba Adamu (to Krylia Sovetov)
38	FW	RUS	Andrei Kordun (to Metallurg Krasnoyarsk)
83	GK	UKR	Rinat Yesipenko (to Krylia Sovetov Moscow)

== Transfers ==
=== In ===
Date	Position	Nationality	Name	From	Fee	Ref.
20 January 2005	GK	(Russia)	Sergei Kozko	Rubin Kazan	Undisclosed	
Winter 2005	GK	(Belarus)	Yuri Zhevnov	BATE Borisov	Undisclosed	
Winter 2005	GK	(Russia)	Maksim Klikin	Arsenal Tula	Undisclosed	
Winter 2005	DF	(Russia)	Dmitri Godunok	Tom Tomsk	Undisclosed	
Winter 2005	DF	(Russia)	Aleksandr Ponomaryov	Dynamo Moscow	Undisclosed	
Winter 2005	MF	(Poland)	Damian Gorawski	Wisła Kraków	Undisclosed	
Winter 2005	FW	(Russia)	Dmitry Golubov	Tekstilshchik Kamyshin	Undisclosed	
Winter 2005	FW	(Russia)	Dmitri Kirichenko	CSKA Moscow	Undisclosed	

=== Out ===
Date	Position	Nationality	Name	To	Fee	Ref.
Summer 2005	GK	(Russia)	Maksim Klikin	Metallurg-Kuzbass Novokuznetsk	Undisclosed	
Summer 2005	GK	(Ukraine)	Rinat Yesipenko	FC Krylia Sovetov Moscow	Undisclosed	
Summer 2005	DF	(Lithuania)	Rolandas Džiaukštas	Saturn Ramenskoye	Undisclosed	
Summer 2005	DF	(Russia)	Kirill Orlov	Rostov	Undisclosed	
Summer 2005	FW	(Ghana)	Baba Adamu	Krylia Sovetov	Undisclosed	
Summer 2005	FW	(Russia)	Budun Budunov	Tom Tomsk	Undisclosed	
Summer 2005	FW	(Russia)	Andrei Kordun	Metallurg Krasnoyarsk	Undisclosed	

=== Loans out ===
Date from	Position	Nationality	Name	To	Date to	Ref.
Winter 2005	MF	(Russia)	Valeri Leonov	Tom Tomsk	End of Season	
Winter 2005	FW	(Romania)	Cristian Tudor	Alania Vladikavkaz	End of Season	
Summer 2005	MF	(Kazakhstan)	Ruslan Baltiev	Shinnik Yaroslavl	End of Season	
Summer 2005	MF	(Russia)	Sergei Sharin	Chkalovets-1936 Novosibirsk	End of Season	
Summer 2005	FW	(Kazakhstan)	Andrei Nikolayev	Metallurg-Kuzbass Novokuznetsk	End of Season	

=== Released ===
Date	Position	Nationality	Name	Joined	Date
31 December 2005	DF	(Russia)	Mikhail Bagayev	Rubin Kazan	
31 December 2005	DF	(Russia)	Vyacheslav Lyskin		
31 December 2005	MF	(Russia)	Sergei Korobov		
31 December 2005	MF	(Russia)	Aleksandr Ryazantsev	Rubin Kazan	
31 December 2005	MF	(Russia)	Sergei Sharin	Sibir Novosibirsk	
31 December 2005	MF	(Ukraine)	Maksym Biletskyi	Rostov	
31 December 2005	FW	(Armenia)	Andrey Movsisyan	Luch-Energiya Vladivostok	
31 December 2005	FW	(Russia)	Andrei Nikolayev	Sibir Novosibirsk	
31 December 2005	FW	(Russia)	Viktor Zemchenkov	Kuban Krasnodar	

== Competitions ==
=== Premier League ===
==== Results by round ====
Round	1	2	3	4	5	6	7	8	9	10	11	12	13	14	15	16	17	18	19	20	21	22	23	24	25	26	27	28	29	30
Ground	W	D	L	D	W	W	W	D	W	D	L	D	D	W	L	W	L	D	W	L	W	W	W	L	D	L	W	L	W	W
Result	A	A	H	A	H	A	H	A	H	A	H	A	H	A	H	H	H	A	H	A	H	A	H	A	H	A	H	A	H	A

Updated to match(es) played on 19 November 2005. Source: See Results
A = Away; H = Home; W = Win; D = Draw; L = Loss

==== Results ====
12 March 2005 1	Spartak Moscow	0–2	FC Moscow	Moscow
18:00 MSK (UTC+3)	Alenichev (yellow card) 26' (penalty missed) 34'; Iencsi (yellow card) 49'; Vidić (yellow card) 72'	Report	Jop 23' (yellow card) 25'; Kuzmin (yellow card) 28'; Kirichenko 56'	Stadium: Luzhniki Stadium; Attendance: 16,000; Referee: Igor Egorov

19 March 2005 2	Lokomotiv Moscow	0–0	FC Moscow	Moscow
14:00 MSK (UTC+3)	Amelyanchuk (yellow card) 64'	Report	Rebeja (yellow card) 19'; Kuzmin (yellow card) 86'	Stadium: RZD Arena; Attendance: 5,800; Referee: Yuri Baskakov

2 April 2005 3	FC Moscow	0–1	Rubin Kazan	Moscow
20:00 MSK (UTC+3)	Rebeja (yellow card) 24'; Biletskyi (yellow card) 57'	Report	Rôni (yellow card) 54'; Čížek 90+'	Stadium: Luzhniki Stadium; Attendance: 4,000; Referee: Alexander Evstigneev

10 April 2005 4	Amkar Perm	0–0	FC Moscow	Moscow
19:00 MSK (UTC+3)	Popov (yellow card) 14'; Pyatibratov (yellow card) 73'; Sirakov (yellow card) 75'; Didenko (yellow card) 85'; Lincar (yellow card) 89'	Report	Godunok (yellow card) 53'	Stadium: Luzhniki Stadium; Attendance: 1,000; Referee: Sergey Lapochkin
Note: Match played at the Luzhniki Stadium in Moscow instead of Amkar Perm's regular Zvezda Stadium in Perm.

16 April 2005 5	FC Moscow	1–0	Rostov	Moscow
18:00 MSK (UTC+3)	Melyoshin 34'; Fredericks (yellow card) 41'; Godunok (yellow card) 78'	Report	Mancini (yellow card) 42'; Kanyenda (yellow card) 43'	Stadium: Eduard Streltsov Stadium; Attendance: 4,500; Referee: Nikolai Ivanov

23 April 2005 6	Dynamo Moscow	0–2	FC Moscow	Moscow
16:00 MSK (UTC+3)	Danny (yellow card) 15'; Loureiro (yellow card) 28'	Report	Bracamonte 20' (yellow card) 75'; Kirichenko 39'; Kuzmin (yellow card) 63'; Rebeja (yellow card) 71'	Stadium: Dynamo Stadium; Attendance: 5,500; Referee: Almir Kayumov

30 April 2005 7	FC Moscow	1–0	Alania Vladikavkaz	Moscow
18:00 MSK (UTC+3)	Bracamonte 11'; Fredericks (yellow card) 43'; Tchuissé (yellow card) 49'; Kuzmin (yellow card) 90+'	Report	Agayev (yellow card) 18'; Dadu (yellow card) 33'; Žutautas (yellow card) 57'; Barasa (red card) 89'	Stadium: Eduard Streltsov Stadium; Attendance: 3,000; Referee: Stanislav Sukhina

15 May 2005 8	Terek Grozny	0–0	Moscow	Pyatigorsk
18:30 MSK (UTC+3)		Report	Tchuissé (yellow card) 56'; Stoica (yellow card) 87'	Stadium: Central Stadium; Attendance: 6,500; Referee: Aleksandr Gvardis

21 May 2005 9	FC Moscow	4–1	Tom Tomsk	Moscow
18:00 MSK (UTC+3)	Bracamonte 16'; Kirichenko 18', 42' (pen.), 51' (pen.); Džiaukštas (yellow card) 61'; Gorawski (yellow card) 83'	Report	Klimov (yellow card) 27' (goal) 79'; Yaskovich (yellow card) 56'; Șișchin (yellow card) 73'	Stadium: Eduard Streltsov Stadium; Attendance: 6,000; Referee: Sergei Timofeyev

28 May 2005 10	CSKA Moscow	1–1	FC Moscow	Moscow
19:00 MSK (UTC+3)	Ignashevich (yellow card) 24'; Dudu (yellow card) 30'; Olić 90+2'	Report	Bracamonte 15' (yellow card) 28'; Biletskyi (yellow card) 32'; Kuzmin (yellow card) 66'; Budunov (yellow card) 84'; Nababkin (yellow card) 86'	Stadium: Dynamo Stadium; Attendance: 7,500; Referee: Yuri Baskakov

12 June 2005 11	FC Moscow	0–1	Krylia Sovetov	Moscow
18:30 MSK (UTC+3)	Ivanov (yellow card) 58'; Fredericks (yellow card) 85'	Report	Bobyor (yellow card) 38'; Husin 88' (pen.)	Stadium: Eduard Streltsov Stadium; Attendance: 11,000; Referee: Igor Egorov

19 June 2005 12	Zenit St.Petersburg	2–2	FC Moscow	Saint Petersburg
20:00 MSK (UTC+3)	Denisov 20'; Hagen (yellow card) 36'; Vještica (yellow card) 53'; Spivak 65' (pen.); Hartig (yellow card) 83'	Report	Ivanov (yellow card) 34'; Rebeja 41'; Gorawski 45'	Stadium: Petrovsky Stadium; Attendance: 20,500; Referee: Aleksandr Gvardis

25 June 2005 13	FC Moscow	1–1	Torpedo Moscow	Moscow
14:00 MSK (UTC+3)	Kirichenko 40'; Tchuissé (yellow card) 70'	Report	Semshov 90+'	Stadium: Eduard Streltsov Stadium; Attendance: 2,000; Referee: Yuri Baskakov

2 July 2005 14	Shinnik Yaroslavl	0–1	FC Moscow	Yaroslavl
18:00 MSK (UTC+3)	Łągiewka (yellow card) 42'; Khazov (yellow card) 44'; Radosavljević (yellow card) 54'	Report	Kuzmin (yellow card) 2' (goal) 47'; Jop (yellow card) 65'; Melyoshin (yellow card) 74'; Godunok (yellow card) 89'	Stadium: Shinnik Stadium; Attendance: 6,100; Referee: Alexander Evstigneev

9 July 2005 15	FC Moscow	0–1	Saturn Ramenskoye	Moscow
18:00 MSK (UTC+3)	Melyoshin (yellow card) 46'; Tchuissé (yellow card) 59'; Jop (yellow card) 70'; Rebeja (yellow card) 79'	Report	Jean (yellow card) 59'; Yesipov 71' (yellow card) 81'; Kinský (yellow card) 79'	Stadium: Eduard Streltsov Stadium; Attendance: 2,500; Referee: Sergei Fursa

16 July 2005 16	FC Moscow	3–1	Spartak Moscow	Moscow
14:00 MSK (UTC+3)	Ivanov (yellow card) 19'; Kirichenko 44', 71'; Bracamonte 67'; Tchuissé (yellow card) 82'	Report	Vidić (yellow card) 49'; Pavlenko 83'	Stadium: Eduard Streltsov Stadium; Attendance: 12,000; Referee: Alexander Kolobaev

23 July 2005 17	FC Moscow	0–1	Lokomotiv Moscow	Moscow
14:00 MSK (UTC+3)	Melyoshin (yellow card) 27'; Ivanov (yellow card) 43'; Fredericks (yellow card) 66'; Kirichenko (yellow card) 72'; Rebeja (yellow card) 79'	Report	Sychev (yellow card) 54' (goal) 56'	Stadium: Eduard Streltsov Stadium; Attendance: 9,000; Referee: Almir Kayumov

30 July 2005 18	Rubin Kazan	1–1	Moscow	Kazan
18:00 MSK (UTC+3)	Baýramow 88'	Report	Godunok (yellow card) 53'; Kuzmin 83'	Stadium: Central Stadium; Attendance: 10,000; Referee: Nikolai Ivanov

6 August 2005 19	FC Moscow	1–0	Amkar Perm	Moscow
MSK (UTC+3)	Melyoshin (yellow card) 27'; Bracamonte (yellow card) 55'; Kirichenko 74' (pen.); Movsisyan (yellow card) 77'; Jop (yellow card) 83'	Report	Lavrik (yellow card) 26'; Povorov (yellow card) 59'	Stadium: Eduard Streltsov Stadium; Attendance: 3,000; Referee: Sergey Lapochkin

20 August 2005 20	Rostov	1–0	FC Moscow	Rostov-on-Don
18:00 MSK (UTC+3)	Kalashnikov (yellow card) 35'; Buznikin 35'; Osinov (yellow card) 76'	Report	Kuzmin (yellow card) 90'	Stadium: Olimp-2; Attendance: 5,500; Referee: Stanislav Sukhina

27 August 2005 21	FC Moscow	2–1	Dynamo Moscow	Moscow
18:00 MSK (UTC+3)	Kirichenko 32' (pen.), 37'	Report	Ribeiro (yellow card) 58'; Maniche (yellow card) 83'	Stadium: Eduard Streltsov Stadium; Attendance: 3,000; Referee: Nikolai Ivanov

10 September 2005 22	Alania Vladikavkaz	0–2	FC Moscow	Vladikavkaz
18:00 MSK (UTC+3)	Đorđević (yellow card) 38'; Dadu (yellow card) 61'	Report	Melyoshin 32' (yellow card) 45'; Godunok 60'; Jop (yellow card) 61'; Gorawski (yellow card) 90+'	Stadium: Republican Spartak Stadium; Attendance: 20,000; Referee: Vladimir Pettay

17 September 2005 23	FC Moscow	2–1	Terek Grozny	Moscow
14:00 MSK (UTC+3)	Kirichenko 35', 90+'; Movsisyan (yellow card) 61'	Report	Dzhabrailov (yellow card) 40'; Adamov (yellow card) 49'; Koroman 64' (pen.); Kingston (yellow card) 66'; Sharonov (yellow card) 68'; Atangana (yellow card) 90+'	Stadium: Eduard Streltsov Stadium; Attendance: 5,500; Referee: Alexander Gonchar

24 September 2005 24	Tom Tomsk	3–2	FC Moscow	Tomsk
16:00 MSK (UTC+3)	Yaskovich (yellow card) 44'; Șișchin 72' (pen.), 75'; Leonov 84'	Report	Kuzmin 12'; Melyoshin (yellow card) 43' (goal) 51'; Jop (yellow card) 70'; Godunok (yellow card) 84'; Ivanov (yellow card) 88'	Stadium: Trud Stadium; Attendance: 11,000; Referee: Aleksandr Gvardis

2 October 2005 25	FC Moscow	0–0	CSKA Moscow	Moscow
14:00 MSK (UTC+3)	Kuzmin (yellow card) 43'; Nababkin (yellow card) 48'; Godunok (yellow card) 56' (red card) 87'; Biletskyi (yellow card) 60'; Tchuissé (yellow card) 64'	Report	Šemberas (yellow card) 40'; Samodin (yellow card) 75'	Stadium: Eduard Streltsov Stadium; Attendance: 9,200; Referee: Mikhail Khodyrev

16 October 2005 26	Krylia Sovetov	4–1	FC Moscow	Samara
16:00 MSK (UTC+3)	Dokhoyan (yellow card) 6'; Topić 43', 68', 90+' (pen.); Husin (penalty missed) 73'; Bobyor 73' (yellow card) 83'	Report	Nababkin (yellow card) 9' (yellow-red card) 57'; Tchuissé (yellow card) 27'; Golubov 89'	Stadium: Metallurg Stadium; Attendance: 20,000

23 October 2005 27	FC Moscow	2–0	Zenit St.Petersburg	Moscow
18:00 MSK (UTC+3)	Rebeja (yellow card) 14' (goal) 21'; Kirichenko 72'	Report	Anyukov (yellow card) 57'; Spivak (yellow card) 64'	Stadium: Eduard Streltsov Stadium; Attendance: 8,000; Referee: Aleksandr Gvardis

29 October 2005 28	Torpedo Moscow	2–0	FC Moscow	Moscow
17:00 MSK (UTC+3)	Zyryanov 44'; Semshov 62'; Laizāns (yellow card) 81'	Report	Gorawski (yellow card) 21'; Nababkin (yellow card) 75'	Stadium: Luzhniki Stadium; Attendance: 2,000; Referee: Aleksei Nikolaev

6 November 2005 29	FC Moscow	3–2	Shinnik Yaroslavl	Moscow
14:00 MSK (UTC+3)	Gorawski 11'; Melyoshin 28', 70' (pen.); Godunok (yellow card) 73'; Kuzmin (yellow card) 78'; Stoica (yellow card) 90+'	Report	Shirko 46', 67'; Radosavljević (yellow card) 47'; Khazov (yellow card) 68'; Budiša (yellow card) 79'; Jurić (yellow card) 90+'	Stadium: Eduard Streltsov Stadium; Attendance: 7,000; Referee: Vladimir Pettay

19 November 2005 30	Saturn Ramenskoye	1–2	FC Moscow	Ramenskoye
14:00 MSK (UTC+3)	Bareiro 35'; Onopko (yellow card) 90+'	Report	Golubov 68', 88'	Stadium: Saturn Stadium; Attendance: 5,000; Referee: Yuri Baskakov

==== League table ====
Pos	Team	Pld	W	D	L	GF	GA	GD	Pts	Qualification or relegation
3	Lokomotiv Moscow	30	14	14	2	41	18	+23	56	Qualification to UEFA Cup first round (Note: Since CSKA Moscow won the 2005–06 Russian Cup, and winner of the Russian Cup should advance to the First Round of UEFA Cup, the spot was awarded to 3rd-positioned team, because CSKA Moscow already qualified for UEFA Champions League. As a result, 4th-positioned team received a spot in the Second Qualifying Round of UEFA Cup, and 5th-positioned team received a spot in the Second Round of UEFA Intertoto Cup)
4	Rubin Kazan	30	14	9	7	45	31	+14	51	Qualification to UEFA Cup second qualifying round
5	FC Moscow	30	14	8	8	36	26	+10	50	Qualification to Intertoto Cup second round
6	Zenit St. Petersburg	30	13	10	7	45	26	+19	49	
7	Torpedo Moscow	30	12	9	9	37	33	+4	45	

Source: RFPL
Rules for classification: 1st points; 2nd matches won; 3rd goal difference; 4th head-to-head (points, matches won, goal difference, goals scored, away goals scored)

=== Russian Cup ===
==== 2004–05 ====
1 March 2005 Round of 16 1st leg	FC Moscow	1–3	CSKA Moscow	Moscow
15:00 MSK (UTC+3)	Budunov (yellow card) 24'; Melyoshin (yellow card) 24'; Bracamonte 54'; Stoica (yellow card) 66'	Report	Samodin (yellow card) 44' (goal) 45'; Ignashevich (yellow card) 60'; Carvalho 62'; Zhirkov (yellow card) 64'; Gusev 90+1' (pen.)	Stadium: Eduard Streltsov Stadium; Attendance: 1,200; Referee: Almir Kayumov

5 March 2005 Round of 16 2nd leg	CSKA Moscow	3–1 (6–2 agg.)	FC Moscow	Moscow
14:00 MSK (UTC+3)	Olić 11'; Laizāns 35'; Ignashevich (yellow card) 54'; Carvalho 63'	Report	Bracamonte (yellow card) 27'; Melyoshin (yellow card) 41' (goal) 76'; Biletskyi (yellow card) 50'	Stadium: Dynamo Stadium; Attendance: 1,500; Referee: Aleksandr Kolobaev

==== 2005–06 ====
6 July 2005 Round of 32 1st leg	Dynamo Makhachkala	1–4	FC Moscow	Moscow
18:00 MSK (UTC+3)	Streltsov 69'	Report	Nikolayev 14'; Zemchenkov (yellow card) 30'; Danilin 80'; Movsisyan 88'; Golyshev 89'	Stadium: Eduard Streltsov Stadium; Attendance: 11,500; Referee: Sergey Lapochkin
Note: Match was played at the Eduard Streltsov Stadium in Moscow instead of Dynamo Makhachkala's regular Dynamo Stadium in Makhachkala.

11 August 2005 Round of 32 2nd leg	FC Moscow	2–2 (6–3 agg.)	Dynamo Makhachkala	Moscow
18:00 MSK (UTC+3)	Movsisyan 27'; Danilin 70'; Džiaukštas (yellow card) 80'	Report	Sadirov 12', 20'; V.Syrovatka (yellow card) 38'; Tonga (yellow card) 41'	Stadium: Eduard Streltsov Stadium; Attendance: 1,000; Referee: Andrey Komarov

The Round of 16 games took place during the 2006 season.

== Squad statistics ==
As of match played 19 November 2005

=== Appearances and goals ===
No.	Pos	Nat	Player	Total		Premier League		2004–05 Russian Cup		2005–06 Russian Cup	
No.	Pos	Nat	Player	Apps	Goals	Apps	Goals	Apps	Goals	Apps	Goals
2	DF	(Russia) RUS	Dmitri Godunok	28	1	27	1	1	0	0	0
5	MF	(Moldova) MDA	Radu Rebeja	30	2	28	2	2	0	0	0
7	MF	(Poland) POL	Damian Gorawski	21	2	12+8	2	0+1	0	0	0
8	DF	(Romania) ROU	Pompiliu Stoica	29	0	19+8	0	2	0	0	0
10	FW	(Russia) RUS	Dmitri Kirichenko	26	14	25+1	14	0	0	0	0
12	GK	(Russia) RUS	Sergei Kozko	4	0	0	0	2	0	2	0
13	MF	(Ukraine) UKR	Maksym Biletskyi	17	0	9+4	0	2	0	2	0
17	FW	(South Africa) RSA	Stanton Fredericks	14	0	4+7	0	0+1	0	2	0
19	FW	(Argentina) ARG	Héctor Bracamonte	27	6	24+1	5	2	1	0	0
20	MF	(Russia) RUS	Aleksei Melyoshin	29	6	27	5	2	1	0	0
22	DF	(Russia) RUS	Oleg Kuzmin	30	3	28	3	0+2	0	0	0
23	FW	(Russia) RUS	Viktor Zemchenkov	2	0	0	0	0	0	1+1	0
25	DF	(Poland) POL	Mariusz Jop	29	1	26+1	1	2	0	0	0
27	FW	(Armenia) ARM	Andrey Movsisyan	17	2	5+10	0	0	0	2	2
30	GK	(Belarus) BLR	Yuri Zhevnov	30	0	30	0	0	0	0	0
31	DF	(Russia) RUS	Mikhail Bagayev	1	0	0	0	0	0	0+1	0
32	DF	(Russia) RUS	Kirill Nababkin	9	0	6+1	0	0	0	2	0
33	DF	(Russia) RUS	Andrei Lukanchenkov	2	0	0	0	0	0	2	0
34	MF	(Russia) RUS	Vyacheslav Danilin	9	2	0+7	0	0	0	2	2
35	FW	(Russia) RUS	Dmitry Golubov	8	3	4+2	3	0	0	1+1	0
39	DF	(Russia) RUS	Aleksandr Sukhov	1	0	0	0	0	0	0+1	0
41	DF	(Russia) RUS	Andrei Moiseyenkov	1	0	0	0	0	0	1	0
42	MF	(Russia) RUS	Pavel Golyshev	3	1	0+1	0	0	0	0+2	1
43	DF	(Russia) RUS	Pyotr Marshinskiy	1	0	0	0	0	0	1	0
77	MF	(Moldova) MDA	Stanislav Ivanov	30	0	22+6	0	1+1	0	0	0
99	DF	(Cameroon) CMR	Jerry-Christian Tchuissé	30	0	28	0	2	0	0	0
Players away from the club on loan:
14	MF	(Kazakhstan) KAZ	Ruslan Baltiev	5	0	1+2	0	2	0	0	0
88	FW	(Russia) RUS	Andrei Nikolayev	1	1	0	0	0	0	1	1
Players who appeared for Moscow but left during the season:
3	DF	(Lithuania) LTU	Rolandas Džiaukštas	7	0	3+2	0	0	0	2	0
11	FW	(Russia) RUS	Budun Budunov	17	0	1+14	0	1+1	0	0	0
18	DF	(Russia) RUS	Kirill Orlov	3	0	0+1	0	1	0	1	0
28	FW	(Ghana) GHA	Baba Adamu	6	0	1+5	0	0	0	0	0

=== Goal scorers ===
Place	Position	Nation	Number	Name	Premier League	2004–05 Russian Cup	2005–06 Russian Cup	Total
1	FW	(Russia)	10	Dmitri Kirichenko	14	0	0	14
2	FW	(Argentina)	19	Héctor Bracamonte	5	1	0	6
2	MF	(Russia)	20	Aleksei Melyoshin	5	1	0	6
4	DF	(Russia)	22	Oleg Kuzmin	3	0	0	3
4	FW	(Russia)	35	Dmitry Golubov	3	0	0	3
6	MF	(Moldova)	5	Radu Rebeja	2	0	0	2
6	MF	(Poland)	7	Damian Gorawski	2	0	0	2
6	FW	(Armenia)	27	Andrey Movsisyan	0	0	2	2
6	MF	(Russia)	34	Vyacheslav Danilin	0	0	2	2
10	DF	(Poland)	25	Mariusz Jop	1	0	0	1
10	DF	(Russia)	2	Dmitri Godunok	1	0	0	1
10	FW	(Russia)	88	Andrei Nikolayev	0	0	1	1
10	FW	(Russia)	42	Pavel Golyshev	0	0	1	1
Total					36	2	6	44

=== Clean sheets ===
Place	Position	Nation	Number	Name	Premier League	2004–05 Russian Cup	2005–06 Russian Cup	Total
1	GK	(Belarus)	30	Yuri Zhevnov	12	0	0	12
TOTALS					12	0	0	12

=== Disciplinary record ===
Number	Nation	Position	Name	Premier League		2004–05 Russian Cup		2005–06 Russian Cup		Total	
Number	Nation	Position	Name	Booked	Sent off (straight red)	Booked	Sent off (straight red)	Booked	Sent off (straight red)	Booked	Sent off (straight red)
2	(Russia)	DF	Dmitri Godunok	7	1	0	0	0	0	7	1
5	(Moldova)	MF	Radu Rebeja	6	0	0	0	0	0	6	0
7	(Poland)	MF	Damian Gorawski	3	0	0	0	0	0	3	0
8	(Romania)	DF	Pompiliu Stoica	2	0	1	0	0	0	3	0
10	(Russia)	FW	Dmitri Kirichenko	1	0	0	0	0	0	1	0
13	(Ukraine)	MF	Maksym Biletskyi	3	0	1	0	0	0	4	0
17	(South Africa)	FW	Stanton Fredericks	4	0	0	0	0	0	4	0
19	(Argentina)	FW	Héctor Bracamonte	3	0	1	0	0	0	4	0
20	(Russia)	MF	Aleksei Melyoshin	6	0	2	0	0	0	8	0
22	(Russia)	DF	Oleg Kuzmin	9	0	0	0	0	0	9	0
23	(Russia)	FW	Viktor Zemchenkov	0	0	0	0	1	0	1	0
25	(Poland)	DF	Mariusz Jop	6	0	0	0	0	0	6	0
27	(Armenia)	FW	Andrey Movsisyan	2	0	0	0	0	0	2	0
32	(Russia)	DF	Kirill Nababkin	5	1	0	0	0	0	5	1
77	(Moldova)	MF	Stanislav Ivanov	5	0	0	0	0	0	5	0
99	(Cameroon)	DF	Jerry-Christian Tchuissé	7	0	0	0	0	0	7	0
Players away on loan:
Players who left Moscow during the season:
3	(Lithuania)	DF	Rolandas Džiaukštas	1	0	0	0	1	0	2	0
11	(Russia)	FW	Budun Budunov	1	0	1	0	0	0	2	0
Total				71	2	6	0	2	0	79	2
