= 2006 FC Moscow season =

Moscow
2006 season
- Manager: Leonid Slutsky
- Stadium: Eduard Streltsov Stadium
- Premier League: 6th
- Russian Cup: Round of 16 vs Torpedo Moscow
- Russian Cup: Progressed to 2007 season
- UEFA Intertoto Cup: Third Round
- Top goalscorer: League: Dmitri Kirichenko (12); All: Dmitri Kirichenko (16)

The 2006 FC Moscow season was the club's 3rd season in existence after taking over the licence of Torpedo-Metallurg in 2004. They finished the season in 6th place, reached the Round of 16 in the 2005–06 Russian Cup, and in the 2006–07 Russian Cup they progressed to the Round of 16 which took place during the 2007 season.

== Squad ==
As of match played 26 November 2006

No.	Name	Nationality	Position	Date of birth (age)	Signed from	Signed in	Contract ends	Apps.	Goals
Goalkeepers
1	Aleksandr Filimonov	(Russia)	GK	15 October 1973 (aged 33)	Uralan Elista	2004		28	0
12	Sergei Kozko	(Russia)	GK	12 April 1975 (aged 31)	Rubin Kazan	2005		19	0
16	Anton Amelchenko	(Belarus)	GK	27 March 1985 (aged 21)	Gomel	2006		0	0
30	Yuri Zhevnov	(Belarus)	GK	17 April 1981 (aged 25)	BATE Borisov	2005		53	0
Defenders
2	Dmitri Godunok	(Russia)	DF	4 January 1976 (aged 30)	Tom Tomsk	2005		61	1
4	Dilaver Zrnanović	(Bosnia and Herzegovina)	DF	17 November 1984 (aged 22)	Budućnost Banovići	2006		1	0
8	Pompiliu Stoica	(Romania)	DF	10 September 1976 (aged 30)	Steaua București	2004		55	0
14	Kirill Nababkin	(Russia)	DF	8 September 1986 (aged 20)	Youth Team	2004		17	0
22	Oleg Kuzmin	(Russia)	DF	9 May 1981 (aged 25)	Uralan Elista	2004		72	5
23	Isaac Okoronkwo	(Nigeria)	DF	1 May 1978 (aged 28)	Alania Vladikavkaz	2006		26	2
25	Mariusz Jop	(Poland)	DF	3 August 1978 (aged 28)	Wisła Kraków	2004		57	4
33	Andrei Moiseyenkov	(Russia)	DF	5 January 1987 (aged 19)	Youth Team	2005		2	0
44	Aleksandr Ponomaryov	(Russia)	DF	25 January 1986 (aged 20)	Dynamo Moscow	2005		0	0
50	Andrei Lukanchenkov	(Russia)	DF	7 February 1986 (aged 20)	Torpedo-Metallurg	2004		4	0
55	Aleksandr Sukhov	(Russia)	DF	3 January 1986 (aged 20)	Youth Team	2004		3	0
80	Pyotr Marshinskiy	(Russia)	DF	18 February 1986 (aged 20)	Youth Team	2005		2	0
99	Jerry-Christian Tchuissé	(Cameroon)	DF	13 January 1975 (aged 31)	Chernomorets Novorossiysk	2004		74	2
Midfielders
3	Pablo Barrientos	(Argentina)	MF	17 January 1985 (aged 21)	San Lorenzo	2006		9	3
5	Radu Rebeja	(Moldova)	MF	8 June 1973 (aged 33)	Saturn Ramenskoye	2004		91	3
6	Pyotr Bystrov	(Russia)	MF	15 July 1979 (aged 27)	Saturn Ramenskoye	2006		32	4
7	Damian Gorawski	(Poland)	MF	4 January 1979 (aged 27)	Wisła Kraków	2005		38	1
9	Sergei Semak	(Russia)	MF	27 February 1976 (aged 30)	Paris Saint-Germain	2006		35	7
11	Tomáš Čížek	(Czech Republic)	MF	27 November 1978 (aged 27)	Rubin Kazan	2006		31	1
20	Aleksei Melyoshin	(Russia)	MF	30 January 1976 (aged 30)	Dynamo St.Petersburg	2004		82	11
24	Ruslan Baltiev	(Kazakhstan)	MF	16 September 1978 (aged 28)	Dynamo Moscow	2004		33	2
27	Serhiy Kobzev	(Ukraine)	MF	4 September 1987 (aged 19)	Shakhtar Donetsk	2006		1	0
34	Vyacheslav Danilin	(Russia)	MF	14 March 1984 (aged 22)	Torpedo-Metallurg	2004		13	3
47	Artyom Varakin	(Russia)	MF	21 April 1987 (aged 19)	Youth Team	2006		1	0
63	Pavel Golyshev	(Russia)	MF	7 July 1987 (aged 19)	Youth Team	2005		5	1
77	Stanislav Ivanov	(Moldova)	MF	7 October 1980 (aged 26)	Sheriff Tiraspol	2004		73	3
Forwards
10	Dmitri Kirichenko	(Russia)	FW	17 January 1977 (aged 29)	CSKA Moscow	2005		62	30
18	Cristian Tudor	(Romania)	FW	23 August 1982 (aged 24)	Sheriff Tiraspol	2004		5	0
19	Héctor Bracamonte	(Argentina)	FW	16 February 1978 (aged 28)	Boca Juniors	2004		87	19
21	Roman Adamov	(Russia)	FW	21 June 1982 (aged 24)	Terek Grozny	2006		33	11
53	Pavel Yesikov	(Russia)	FW	29 January 1988 (aged 18)	Youth Team	2006		0	0
72	Jambulat Ibragimov	(Russia)	FW	4 May 1986 (aged 20)	Terek-2 Grozny	2006		0	0
Away on loan
15	Valeri Leonov	(Russia)	MF	17 September 1980 (aged 26)	Torpedo-Metallurg	2004		13	0
35	Dmitry Golubov	(Russia)	FW	24 June 1985 (aged 21)	Tekstilshchik Kamyshin	2005		19	3
Players that left Moscow during the season
17	Stanton Fredericks	(South Africa)	FW	13 June 1977 (aged 29)	Kaizer Chiefs	2004		18	1
18	Dragan Trešnjić	(Serbia)	MF	11 May 1985 (aged 21)	Dinamo București	2006		0	0
44	Ivan Bakulin	(Russia)	MF	16 April 1986 (aged 20)	Torpedo-Metallurg	2004		1	0

=== On loan ===
Note: Flags indicate national team as defined under FIFA eligibility rules; some limited exceptions apply. Players may hold more than one non-FIFA nationality.

No. / Pos. / Nation / Player; 15 / MF / RUS / Valeri Leonov (at Terek Grozny)	No. / Pos. / Nation / Player; 35 / FW / RUS / Dmitry Golubov (at Torpedo Moscow)

=== Left club during season ===
Note: Flags indicate national team as defined under FIFA eligibility rules; some limited exceptions apply. Players may hold more than one non-FIFA nationality.

No.	Pos.	Nation	Player
17	FW	RSA	Stanton Fredericks (to Orlando Pirates)
18	MF	SRB	Dragan Trešnjić (to Maribor)

No.	Pos.	Nation	Player
44	MF	RUS	Ivan Bakulin (to Metallurg Krasnoyarsk)

== Transfers ==
=== In ===
Date	Position	Nationality	Name	From	Fee	Ref.
Winter 2006	GK	(Belarus)	Anton Amelchenko	Gomel	Undisclosed	
Winter 2006	DF	(Bosnia and Herzegovina)	Dilaver Zrnanović	Budućnost Banovići	Undisclosed	
Winter 2006	DF	(Nigeria)	Isaac Okoronkwo	Alania Vladikavkaz	Undisclosed	
Winter 2006	MF	(Czech Republic)	Tomáš Čížek	Rubin Kazan	Undisclosed	
Winter 2006	MF	(Russia)	Pyotr Bystrov	Saturn Ramenskoye	Undisclosed	
Winter 2006	MF	(Russia)	Sergei Semak	Paris Saint-Germain	Undisclosed	
Winter 2006	MF	(Ukraine)	Serhiy Kobzev	Shakhtar Donetsk	Undisclosed	
Winter 2006	FW	(Russia)	Roman Adamov	Terek Grozny	Undisclosed	
July 2006	MF	(Argentina)	Pablo Barrientos	San Lorenzo	Undisclosed	
July 2006	MF	(Serbia)	Dragan Trešnjić	Dinamo București	Undisclosed	

=== Out ===
Date	Position	Nationality	Name	To	Fee	Ref.
Summer 2006	MF	(Russia)	Ivan Bakulin	Metallurg Krasnoyarsk	Undisclosed	
Summer 2006	MF	(Serbia)	Dragan Trešnjić	Maribor	Undisclosed	
Summer 2006	FW	(South Africa)	Stanton Fredericks	Orlando Pirates	Undisclosed	

=== Loans out ===
Date from	Position	Nationality	Name	To	Date to	Ref.
Winter 2006	MF	(Russia)	Valeri Leonov	Terek Grozny	End of Season	
Summer 2006	FW	(Russia)	Dmitry Golubov	Torpedo Moscow	End of Season	

=== Released ===
Date	Position	Nationality	Name	Joined	Date
31 December 2006	DF	(Cameroon)	Jerry-Christian Tchuissé	Terek Grozny	
31 December 2006	MF	(Kazakhstan)	Ruslan Baltiev	Tobol	
31 December 2006	MF	(Russia)	Vyacheslav Danilin	Dinaburg	
31 December 2006	MF	(Russia)	Valeri Leonov	Sibir Novosibirsk	
31 December 2006	MF	(Ukraine)	Serhiy Kobzev		
31 December 2006	FW	(Romania)	Cristian Tudor	Alania Vladikavkaz	
31 December 2006	FW	(Russia)	Jambulat Ibragimov		

== Competitions ==
=== Premier League ===
==== Results by round ====
Round	1	2	3	4	5	6	7	8	9	10	11	12	13	14	15	16	17	18	19	20	21	22	23	24	25	26	27	28	29	30
Ground	H	A	H	H	H	A	H	A	H	H	H	H	A	H	A	A	H	A	A	A	H	A	H	A	A	A	A	H	A	H
Result	W	L	W	W	D	D	L	L	L	D	D	D	W	D	D	D	W	W	D	D	D	W	L	L	D	W	D	W	L	W

Updated to match(es) played on 26 November 2006. Source: See Results
A = Away; H = Home; W = Win; D = Draw; L = Loss

==== Results ====
17 March 2006 1	FC Moscow	1–0	Amkar Perm	Moscow
19:00 MSK (UTC+3)	Rebeja (yellow card) 31'; Godunok (yellow card) 33'; Kirichenko 56' (pen.); Jop (yellow card) 62'; Bracamonte (yellow card) 83'; Bystrov (yellow card) 87'; Melyoshin (yellow card) 90+'	Report	Kushev (yellow card) 59'; Cherenchikov (yellow card) 86'	Stadium: Eduard Streltsov Stadium; Attendance: 3,000; Referee: Nikolai Ivanov

26 March 2006 2	Rostov	4–0	FC Moscow	Rostov-on-Don
15:00 MSK (UTC+3)	Kruščić (yellow card) 34'; Tanasijević (yellow card) 36'; Pérez 40'; Buznikin 54'; Osinov 61'; Bendz 67'	Report	Kirichenko (yellow card) 1'; Kuzmin (yellow card) 39'	Stadium: Olimp-2; Attendance: 12,000; Referee: Igor Egorov

2 April 2006 3	FC Moscow	1–0	Krylia Sovetov	Moscow
16:00 MSK (UTC+3)	Kirichenko 22' (yellow card) 62'; Nababkin (yellow card) 55' (yellow-red card) 90+'; Bracamonte (yellow card) 70'; Godunok (yellow card) 80'	Report	Booth (yellow card) 90+'	Stadium: Eduard Streltsov Stadium; Attendance: 7,500; Referee: Vladimir Pettay

8 April 2006 4	FC Moscow	2–1	Luch-Energiya Vladivostok	Moscow
16:00 MSK (UTC+3)	Jop (yellow card) 37'; Kirichenko 64' (pen.); Adamov 86'	Report	B.Ajinjal (yellow card) 7'; Ivanov 25' (yellow card) 36'; Semochko (yellow card) 69'	Stadium: Eduard Streltsov Stadium; Attendance: 5,300; Referee: Sergey Timofeev

16 April 2006 5	FC Moscow	1–1	Spartak Nalchik	Moscow
16:00 MSK (UTC+3)	Bystrov (yellow card) 8'; Melyoshin (yellow card) 58'; Jop (yellow card) 64'; Semak 90+'	Report	Serdyukov 20' (yellow card) 59'; Pylypchuk (yellow card) 66'; Chikhradze (yellow card) 81'	Stadium: Eduard Streltsov Stadium; Attendance: 7,000; Referee: Alexey Tyumin

23 April 2006 6	Spartak Moscow	3–3	FC Moscow	Moscow
14:00 MSK (UTC+3)	Mozart 8' (pen.) (penalty missed) 14' (yellow card) 90+'; Bazhenov (yellow card) 20'; Titov 39'; Kováč (yellow card) 55'	Report	Kuzmin (yellow card) 51'; Kirichenko 61' (pen.); Semak 63'; Jop (yellow card) 69'; Čížek 82'; Adamov (yellow card) 90+'	Stadium: Luzhniki Stadium; Attendance: 15,000; Referee: Yuri Baskakov

30 April 2006 7	FC Moscow	0–1	Lokomotiv Moscow	Moscow
18:30 MSK (UTC+3)	Kuzmin (yellow card) 29'; Godunok (yellow card) 68'; Čížek (yellow card) 76'	Report	Gurenko (yellow card) 55'; Sychev 90+'	Stadium: Eduard Streltsov Stadium; Attendance: 7,500; Referee: Alexander Kolobaev

7 May 2006 8	Rubin Kazan	2–0	FC Moscow	Kazan
14:00 MSK (UTC+3)	García (yellow card) 64'; Bukharov 67', 90+'; Makhmutov (yellow card) 83'	Report	Melyoshin (yellow card) 15'; Jop (yellow card) 45'; Ivanov (yellow card) 63'	Stadium: Central Stadium; Attendance: 15,000; Referee: Alexei Kovalev

14 May 2006 9	FC Moscow	0–1	CSKA Moscow	Moscow
14:00 MSK (UTC+3)	Melyoshin (yellow card) 11'; Bystrov (yellow card) 36'; Adamov (yellow card) 39'; Godunok (yellow card) 54'; Semak (yellow card) 55'; Kuzmin (yellow card) 77'	Report	Jô 17'; Rahimić (yellow card) 34'	Stadium: Eduard Streltsov Stadium; Attendance: 12,500; Referee: Almir Kayumov

11 July 2006 10	FC Moscow	0–0	Zenit St.Petersburg	Moscow
19:00 MSK (UTC+3)	Rebeja (yellow card) 17'; Okoronkwo (yellow card) 58'; Semak (yellow card) 76'	Report	Radimov (yellow card) 32'; Hagen (yellow card) 36'; Škrtel (yellow card) 49'; Lee (yellow card) 86'	Stadium: Eduard Streltsov Stadium; Attendance: 5,000; Referee: Igor Egorov

17 July 2006 11	FC Moscow	1–1	Torpedo Moscow	Moscow
MSK (UTC+3)	Tchuissé (yellow card) 65'; Ivanov 76'; Adamov (yellow card) 81'	Report	Lutsenko 35'; Jokić (yellow card) 62'; Kormiltsev (yellow card) 77'	Stadium: Eduard Streltsov Stadium; Attendance: 1,000; Referee: Alexey Nikolaev

23 July 2006 12	FC Moscow	1–1	Dynamo Moscow	Moscow
MSK (UTC+3)	Bystrov (yellow card) 9'; Bracamonte 36'; Kirichenko (yellow card) 40'; Okoronkwo (yellow card) 87'; Semak (yellow card) 90+'	Report	Lima (yellow card) 53'; Jean (yellow card) 64'; Ovchinnikov (yellow card) 75' (red card) 76'; Bulykin 84'	Stadium: Eduard Streltsov Stadium; Attendance: 5,000; Referee: Igor Zakharov

30 July 2006 13	Shinnik Yaroslavl	1–2	FC Moscow	Yaroslavl
17:00 MSK (UTC+3)	Matić (yellow card) 23'; Kostić (yellow card) 30'; Amelyanchuk 59'; Horák (yellow card) 74'	Report	Okoronkwo 32'; Ivanov (yellow card) 38' (yellow-red card) 61'; Kirichenko 55'; Gorawski (yellow card) 90+'	Stadium: Shinnik Stadium; Attendance: 8,000; Referee: Dmitry Terekhov

6 August 2006 14	FC Moscow	0–0	Tom Tomsk	Moscow
19:00 MSK (UTC+3)	Adamov (yellow card) 56'	Report	Kulchy (yellow card) 47'; Rekhtin (yellow card) 70'; Klimov (yellow card) 90'	Stadium: Eduard Streltsov Stadium; Attendance: 3,200; Referee: Stanislav Sukhina

12 August 2006 15	Saturn Ramenskoye	1–1	FC Moscow	Ramenskoye
18:00 MSK (UTC+3)	Česnauskis (yellow card) 68'; Eremenko 71' (pen.) (yellow card) 83'	Report	Godunok (yellow card) 17'; Okoronkwo (yellow card) 39'; Polovinchuk 55' (o.g.); Ivanov (yellow card) 76'	Stadium: Saturn Stadium; Attendance: 7,200; Referee: Sergey Fursa

20 August 2006 16	Amkar Perm	2–2	FC Moscow	Perm
16:00 MSK (UTC+3)	Savin 33', 52'; Lavrik (yellow card) 48'; Popov (yellow card) 62'	Report	Adamov 64' (yellow card) 90+'; Semak 68'; Melyoshin (yellow card) 68'; Kirichenko (yellow card) 81'	Stadium: Zvezda Stadium; Attendance: 16:00; Referee: Sergey Timofeev

26 August 2006 17	FC Moscow	4–0	Rostov	Moscow
MSK (UTC+3)	Okoronkwo 30'; Bracamonte 48'; Semak 54' (yellow card) 67'; Adamov 76' (pen.)	Report	Bochkov (yellow card) 50'; Biletskyi (yellow card) 90+'	Stadium: Eduard Streltsov Stadium; Attendance: 3,100; Referee: Nikolai Ivanov

9 September 2006 18	Krylia Sovetov	0–4	FC Moscow	Samara
18:00 MSK (UTC+3)	Fileković (yellow card) 37'	Report	Bracamonte 17'; Rebeja (yellow card) 24'; Stoica (yellow card) 73'; Barrientos 80'; Adamov 83', 87'	Stadium: Metallurg Stadium; Attendance: 18,000; Referee: Alexander Evstigneev

16 September 2006 19	Luch-Energiya Vladivostok	1–1	FC Moscow	Vladivostok
12:00 MSK (UTC+3)	Shtanyuk 26'; B.Ajinjal (yellow card) 31'; Semochko (yellow card) 83'	Report	Stoica (yellow card) 8'; Melyoshin 32'; Čížek (yellow card) 80'; Kozko (yellow card) 90'	Stadium: Dynamo Stadium; Attendance: 10,000; Referee: Vladimir Pettay

24 September 2006 20	Spartak Nalchik	2–2	FC Moscow	Nalchik
17:30 MSK (UTC+3)	Skvortsov (yellow card) 6'; Korchagin (yellow card) 9'; Gogua (yellow card) 13' (yellow-red card) 74'; Kontsedalov (yellow card) 44'; Pylypchuk 58'; Jurić (yellow card) 81' (goal) 81'	Report	Kuzmin (yellow card) 17' (yellow-red card) 24'; Kirichenko 22', 83' (yellow card) 83'	Stadium: Spartak Stadium; Attendance: 14,200; Referee: Eduard Malyi

1 October 2006 21	FC Moscow	3–3	Spartak Moscow	Moscow
14:00 MSK (UTC+3)	Semak (yellow card) 26' (goal) 87'; Barrientos (yellow card) 38'; Melyoshin (yellow card) 43'; Godunok (yellow card) 57'; Adamov 68', 74' (pen.); Okoronkwo (yellow card) 75'	Report	Géder (yellow card) 30'; Pavlyuchenko 35'; Kowalewski (yellow card) 38'; Shishkin (yellow card) 49' (goal) 66'; Kováč 76'	Stadium: Eduard Streltsov Stadium; Attendance: 10,000; Referee: Alexey Nikolaev

14 October 2006 22	Lokomotiv Moscow	0–1	FC Moscow	Moscow
19:00 MSK (UTC+3)	Spahić (yellow card) 14'; Bilyaletdinov (yellow card) 57'; Gurenko (yellow card) 73'	Report	Barrientos (yellow card) 45' (goal) 77'	Stadium: RZD Arena; Attendance: 11,523; Referee: Igor Egorov

22 October 2006 23	FC Moscow	0–5	Rubin Kazan	Moscow
16:00 MSK (UTC+3)	Melyoshin (yellow card) 10'; Barrientos (yellow card) 44'	Report	Sibaya 4'; Domínguez 7', 32', 53'; Calisto 39'	Stadium: Eduard Streltsov Stadium; Attendance: 3,000; Referee: Eduard Malyi

25 October 2006 24	CSKA Moscow	2–1	FC Moscow	Moscow
18:00 MSK (UTC+3)	Ignashevich (yellow card) 24'; Vágner Love 26', 45'; Krasić (yellow card) 75'; Rahimić (yellow card) 90'	Report	Adamov 32'; Bracamonte (yellow card) 33'; Rebeja (yellow card) 35'; Stoica (yellow card) 50' (yellow-red card) 85'	Stadium: Dynamo Stadium; Attendance: 6,500; Referee: Igor Zakharov

29 October 2006 25	Zenit St.Petersburg	1–1	FC Moscow	Saint Petersburg
14:30 MSK (UTC+3)	Arshavin 14'; Radimov (yellow card) 72'; Šírl (yellow card) 80'; Tekke (yellow card) 90'	Report	Barrientos (yellow card) 25'; Rebeja (yellow card) 32'; Adamov (yellow card) 43'; Bystrov 90'	Stadium: Petrovsky Stadium; Attendance: 18,700; Referee: Stanislav Sukhina

4 November 2006 26	Torpedo Moscow	0–2	FC Moscow	Moscow
14:00 MSK (UTC+3)	Jääger (yellow card) 51'; Budylin (penalty missed) 60'; Tumasyan (yellow card) 67'	Report	Bystrov (yellow card) 39' (goal) 69'; Kirichenko 55'	Stadium: Luzhniki Stadium; Attendance: 3,500; Referee: Igor Egorov

8 November 2006 27	Dynamo Moscow	1–1	FC Moscow	Moscow
19:00 MSK (UTC+3)	Derlei 62'	Report	Bystrov (yellow card) 61'; Kirichenko 66'; Okoronkwo (yellow card) 67'	Stadium: Dynamo Stadium; Attendance: 6,000; Referee: Stanislav Sukhina

13 November 2006 28	FC Moscow	4–1	Shinnik Yaroslavl	Moscow
MSK (UTC+3)	Kuzmin 1'; Okoronkwo (yellow card) 50'; Kirichenko 57', 72' (pen.); Semak (yellow card) 77' (goal) 88'	Report	Kline (yellow card) 58'; Bakoš 73'; Konovalov (yellow card) 74'; Budiša (yellow card) 76'; Shirko (yellow card) 80'	Stadium: Eduard Streltsov Stadium; Attendance: 1,500; Referee: Sergey Fursa

18 November 2006 29	Tom Tomsk	1–0	FC Moscow	Tomsk
14:00 MSK (UTC+3)	Skerla (yellow card) 65'; Klimov 68'	Report		Stadium: Trud Stadium; Attendance: 13,000; Referee: Stanislav Sukhina

26 November 2006 30	FC Moscow	2–1	Saturn Ramenskoye	Moscow
16:00 MSK (UTC+3)	Lukanchenkov (yellow card) 3'; Semak 12'; Kirichenko 31'; Melyoshin (yellow card) 64'; Kuzmin (yellow card) 75'	Report	Jakubko (yellow card) 40'; Petráš (yellow card) 51'; Vukčević (penalty missed) 60'; Gyan (yellow card) 63'; Sabitov 71'; Lebedenko (yellow card) 73'	Stadium: Eduard Streltsov Stadium; Attendance: 4,500; Referee: Igor Egorov

==== League table ====
Pos	Team	Pld	W	D	L	GF	GA	GD	Pts	Qualification or relegation
4	Zenit St. Petersburg	30	13	11	6	42	30	+12	50	Qualification to UEFA Cup second qualifying round
5	Rubin Kazan	30	14	7	9	45	35	+10	49	Qualification to Intertoto Cup second round
6	FC Moscow	30	10	13	7	41	37	+4	43	
7	Luch-Energiya Vladivostok	30	12	5	13	37	39	−2	41	
8	Tom Tomsk	30	11	8	11	35	33	+2	41	

Source: RFPL
Rules for classification: 1st points; 2nd matches won; 3rd goal difference; 4th head-to-head (points, matches won, goal difference, goals scored, away goals scored); 5th goals scored; 6th away goals scored; 7th drawing of lots

=== Russian Cup ===
==== 2005–06 ====
5 March 2006 Round of 16 1st leg	Torpedo Moscow	1–2	FC Moscow	Moscow
18:00 MSK (UTC+3)	Zyryanov 21' (pen.); Jääger (yellow card) 30'; Geynrikh (yellow card) 53'	Report	Kirichenko 43'; Bystrov (yellow card) 60'; Tchuissé (yellow card) 65'; Rebeja (yellow card) 70'; Adamov 84'	Stadium: Luzhniki Stadium; Attendance: 3,000; Referee: Igor Zakharov

12 March 2006 Round of 16 2nd leg	FC Moscow	1–3 (3–4 agg.)	Torpedo Moscow	Moscow
14:00 MSK (UTC+3)	Kirichenko 9'; Ivanov (yellow card) 31'; Godunok (yellow card) 86'	Report	Kantonistov 37'; Panov 39'; Zyryanov (yellow card) 57'; Mamayev 89'; Kormiltsev (yellow card) 89'	Stadium: Dynamo Stadium; Attendance: 2,000; Referee: Alexander Kolobaev
Note: Match played at the Dynamo Stadium in Moscow, instead of FC Moscow's regular Eduard Streltsov Stadium.

==== 2006–07 ====
2 July 2006 Round of 32 1st leg	Terek Grozny	4–1	FC Moscow	Pyatigorsk
18:30 MSK (UTC+3)	Pokorn (yellow card) 8'; Budunov 12', 29' (pen.); Atangana 46'; Sırxayev 81'	Report	Sukhov (yellow card) 79'; Danilin 84'	Stadium: Central Stadium; Attendance: 2,800; Referee: Vladimir Pettay

20 September 2006 Round of 32 2nd leg	FC Moscow	4–0 (5–4 agg.)	Terek Grozny	Moscow
18:00 MSK (UTC+3)	Barrientos 8'; Kirichenko 14', 39'; Bystrov 75'	Report	Dzhabrailov (yellow card) 27'; Karytska (yellow card) 32'; Sharonov (yellow card) 47'	Stadium: Eduard Streltsov Stadium; Attendance: 3,500; Referee: Stanislav Sukhina

The Round of 16 games took place during the 2007 season.

=== UEFA Intertoto Cup ===
1 July 2006 Second Round 1st leg	FC Moscow (Russia)	2–0	(Belarus) MTZ-RIPO Minsk	Moscow, Moscow
MSK (UTC+3)	Bystrov 57'; Adamov 86'			Stadium: Eduard Streltsov Stadium; Attendance: 1,000; Referee: Michalis Germanakos (Greece)

9 July 2006 Second Round 2nd leg	MTZ-RIPO Minsk (Belarus)	0–1 (0–3 agg.)	(Russia) FC Moscow	Minsk, Belarus
MSK (UTC+3)	Tarashchyk (red card) 90+1'		Adamov 81' (pen.)	Stadium: Traktor Stadium; Attendance: 1,400; Referee: Marek Mikolajewski (Poland)

16 July 2006 Third Round 1st leg	Hertha BSC (Germany)	0–0	(Russia) FC Moscow	Berlin, Germany
MSK (UTC+3)				Stadium: Friedrich-Ludwig-Jahn-Sportpark; Attendance: 8,404; Referee: Mark Clattenburg (England)

22 July 2006 Third Round 2nd leg	FC Moscow (Russia)	0–2 (0–2 agg.)	(Germany) Hertha BSC	Moscow, Moscow
MSK (UTC+3)			Pantelić 25'; Yıldıray 85'	Stadium: Eduard Streltsov Stadium; Attendance: 3,500; Referee: Bülent Demirlek (Turkey)

== Squad statistics ==
As of match played 26 November 2006

=== Appearances and goals ===
No.	Pos	Nat	Player	Total		Premier League		2005–06 Russian Cup		2006–07 Russian Cup		UEFA Intertoto Cup	
No.	Pos	Nat	Player	Apps	Goals	Apps	Goals	Apps	Goals	Apps	Goals	Apps	Goals
1	GK	(Russia) RUS	Aleksandr Filimonov	1	0	0	0	0	0	1	0	0	0
2	DF	(Russia) RUS	Dmitri Godunok	33	0	27	0	2	0	0	0	4	0
3	MF	(Argentina) ARG	Pablo Barrientos	9	3	7+1	2	0	0	1	1	0	0
4	DF	(Bosnia and Herzegovina) BIH	Dilaver Zrnanović	1	0	0	0	0	0	0+1	0	0	0
5	MF	(Moldova) MDA	Radu Rebeja	32	0	24+1	0	0+2	0	1	0	3+1	0
6	MF	(Russia) RUS	Pyotr Bystrov	32	4	22+3	2	2	0	1	1	4	1
7	MF	(Poland) POL	Damian Gorawski	17	0	8+4	0	0+1	0	1	0	2+1	0
8	DF	(Romania) ROU	Pompiliu Stoica	15	0	11+2	0	0	0	1+1	0	0	0
9	MF	(Russia) RUS	Sergei Semak	35	7	28	7	2	0	0+1	0	3+1	0
10	FW	(Russia) RUS	Dmitri Kirichenko	36	16	26+2	12	2	2	2	2	2+2	0
11	MF	(Czech Republic) CZE	Tomáš Čížek	31	1	10+17	1	0	0	1	0	2+1	0
12	GK	(Russia) RUS	Sergei Kozko	15	0	11+1	0	2	0	1	0	0	0
14	DF	(Russia) RUS	Kirill Nababkin	8	0	6	0	1	0	1	0	0	0
19	FW	(Argentina) ARG	Héctor Bracamonte	30	3	17+7	3	2	0	0	0	2+2	0
20	MF	(Russia) RUS	Aleksei Melyoshin	25	1	17+5	1	2	0	0+1	0	0	0
21	FW	(Russia) RUS	Roman Adamov	33	11	16+11	8	0+2	1	0	0	2+2	2
22	DF	(Russia) RUS	Oleg Kuzmin	34	1	28	1	2	0	0	0	4	0
23	DF	(Nigeria) NGA	Isaac Okoronkwo	26	2	20	2	1	0	1	0	4	0
25	DF	(Poland) POL	Mariusz Jop	12	0	9	0	0	0	2	0	1	0
27	MF	(Ukraine) UKR	Serhiy Kobzev	1	0	0	0	0	0	0+1	0	0	0
30	GK	(Belarus) BLR	Yuri Zhevnov	23	0	19	0	0	0	0	0	4	0
33	DF	(Russia) RUS	Andrei Moiseyenkov	1	0	0	0	0	0	1	0	0	0
34	MF	(Russia) RUS	Vyacheslav Danilin	3	1	0+2	0	0	0	1	1	0	0
35	FW	(Russia) RUS	Dmitry Golubov	11	0	0+7	0	0	0	1	0	2+1	0
47	MF	(Russia) RUS	Artyom Varakin	1	0	0	0	0	0	1	0	0	0
50	DF	(Russia) RUS	Andrei Lukanchenkov	2	0	1	0	0	0	1	0	0	0
55	DF	(Russia) RUS	Aleksandr Sukhov	2	0	0+1	0	0	0	0+1	0	0	0
63	MF	(Russia) RUS	Pavel Golyshev	2	0	0	0	0	0	1	0	0+1	0
77	MF	(Moldova) MDA	Stanislav Ivanov	28	1	11+12	1	2	0	1	0	2	0
80	DF	(Russia) RUS	Pyotr Marshinskiy	1	0	0	0	0	0	1	0	0	0
99	DF	(Cameroon) CMR	Jerry-Christian Tchuissé	19	0	12+2	0	2	0	0	0	3	0
Players away from the club on loan:
Players who appeared for Moscow but left during the season:
17	FW	(South Africa) RSA	Stanton Fredericks	1	0	0	0	0+1	0	0	0	0	0

=== Goal scorers ===
Place	Position	Nation	Number	Name	Premier League	2005–06 Russian Cup	2006–07 Russian Cup	UEFA Intertoto Cup	Total
1	FW	(Russia)	10	Dmitri Kirichenko	12	2	2	0	16
2	FW	(Russia)	21	Roman Adamov	8	1	0	2	11
3	MF	(Russia)	9	Sergei Semak	7	0	0	0	7
4	MF	(Russia)	6	Pyotr Bystrov	2	0	1	1	4
5	FW	(Argentina)	19	Héctor Bracamonte	3	0	0	0	3
5	MF	(Argentina)	3	Pablo Barrientos	2	0	1	0	3
7	DF	(Nigeria)	23	Isaac Okoronkwo	2	0	0	0	2
8	MF	(Czech Republic)	11	Tomáš Čížek	1	0	0	0	1
8	MF	(Moldova)	77	Stanislav Ivanov	1	0	0	0	1
8	MF	(Russia)	20	Aleksei Melyoshin	1	0	0	0	1
8	DF	(Russia)	22	Oleg Kuzmin	1	0	0	0	1
8	MF	(Russia)	34	Vyacheslav Danilin	0	0	1	0	1
8				Own goal	1	0	0	0	1
Total					41	3	5	3	52

=== Clean sheets ===
Place	Position	Nation	Number	Name	Premier League	2005–06 Russian Cup	2006–07 Russian Cup	UEFA Intertoto Cup	Total
1	GK	(Belarus)	30	Yuri Zhevnov	4	0	0	3	7
2	GK	(Russia)	12	Sergei Kozko	4	0	1	0	5
TOTALS					8	0	1	3	12

=== Disciplinary record ===
Number	Nation	Position	Name	Premier League		2005–06 Russian Cup		2006–07 Russian Cup		UEFA Intertoto Cup		Total	
Number	Nation	Position	Name	Booked	Sent off (straight red)	Booked	Sent off (straight red)	Booked	Sent off (straight red)	Booked	Sent off (straight red)	Booked	Sent off (straight red)
2	(Russia)	DF	Dmitri Godunok	6	0	1	0	0	0	0	0	7	0
3	(Argentina)	MF	Pablo Barrientos	4	0	0	0	0	0	0	0	4	0
5	(Moldova)	MF	Radu Rebeja	5	0	1	0	0	0	0	0	6	0
6	(Russia)	MF	Pyotr Bystrov	6	0	1	0	0	0	0	0	7	0
7	(Poland)	MF	Damian Gorawski	1	0	0	0	0	0	0	0	1	0
8	(Romania)	DF	Pompiliu Stoica	4	1	0	0	0	0	0	0	4	1
9	(Russia)	MF	Sergei Semak	6	0	0	0	0	0	0	0	6	0
10	(Russia)	FW	Dmitri Kirichenko	5	0	0	0	0	0	0	0	5	0
11	(Czech Republic)	MF	Tomáš Čížek	2	0	0	0	0	0	0	0	2	0
12	(Russia)	GK	Sergei Kozko	1	0	0	0	0	0	0	0	1	0
14	(Russia)	DF	Kirill Nababkin	2	1	0	0	0	0	0	0	2	1
19	(Argentina)	FW	Héctor Bracamonte	3	0	0	0	0	0	0	0	3	0
20	(Russia)	MF	Aleksei Melyoshin	8	0	0	0	0	0	0	0	8	0
21	(Russia)	FW	Roman Adamov	6	0	0	0	0	0	0	0	6	0
22	(Russia)	DF	Oleg Kuzmin	7	1	0	0	0	0	0	0	7	1
23	(Nigeria)	DF	Isaac Okoronkwo	6	0	0	0	0	0	0	0	6	0
25	(Poland)	DF	Mariusz Jop	5	0	0	0	0	0	0	0	5	0
50	(Russia)	DF	Andrei Lukanchenkov	1	0	0	0	0	0	0	0	1	0
55	(Russia)	DF	Aleksandr Sukhov	0	0	0	0	1	0	0	0	1	0
77	(Moldova)	MF	Stanislav Ivanov	4	1	1	0	0	0	0	0	5	1
99	(Cameroon)	DF	Jerry-Christian Tchuissé	1	0	1	0	0	0	0	0	2	0
Players away on loan:
Players who left Moscow during the season:
Total				83	4	5	0	1	0	0	0	89	4
