= 2007 FC Moscow season =

Moscow
2007 season
- Manager: Leonid Slutsky
- Stadium: Eduard Streltsov Stadium
- Premier League: 4th
- Russian Cup: Runners Up
- Russian Cup: Quarterfinal vs Amkar Perm
- Top goalscorer: League: Roman Adamov (13); All: Roman Adamov (15)

The 2007 FC Moscow season was the club's 4th season in existence after taking over the licence of Torpedo-Metallurg in 2004. They finished the season in 4th place, qualifying for the UEFA Cup, were runners up to Lokomotiv Moscow in the 2006–07 Russian Cup and were knocked out of the 2007–08 Russian Cup at the Quarterfinal stage by Amkar Perm.

== Season events ==
Following the completion of the season, Leonid Slutsky left the club, with Oleg Blokhin being appointed as the club's new manager on 14 December.

== Squad ==
As of match played 11 November 2007

No.	Name	Nationality	Position	Date of birth (age)	Signed from	Signed in	Contract ends	Apps.	Goals
Goalkeepers
12	Sergei Kozko	(Russia)	GK	12 April 1975 (aged 32)	Rubin Kazan	2005		22	0
16	Anton Amelchenko	(Belarus)	GK	27 March 1985 (aged 22)	Gomel	2006		5	0
30	Yuri Zhevnov	(Belarus)	GK	17 April 1981 (aged 26)	BATE Borisov	2005		87	0
	Illya Hawrylaw	(Belarus)	GK	26 September 1988 (aged 19)	Dinamo Minsk	2007		0	0
Defenders
2	Dmitri Godunok	(Russia)	DF	4 January 1976 (aged 31)	Tom Tomsk	2005		90	1
4	Roman Hubník	(Czech Republic)	DF	6 June 1984 (aged 23)	Sigma Olomouc	2007		8	1
8	Pompiliu Stoica	(Romania)	DF	10 September 1976 (aged 31)	Steaua București	2004		89	0
14	Kirill Nababkin	(Russia)	DF	8 September 1986 (aged 21)	Youth Team	2004		29	0
15	Alexandru Epureanu	(Moldova)	DF	27 September 1986 (aged 21)	Sheriff Tiraspol	2007		28	0
22	Oleg Kuzmin	(Russia)	DF	9 May 1981 (aged 26)	Uralan Elista	2004		105	5
23	Isaac Okoronkwo	(Nigeria)	DF	1 May 1978 (aged 29)	Alania Vladikavkaz	2006		43	2
24	Dilaver Zrnanović	(Bosnia and Herzegovina)	DF	17 November 1984 (aged 22)	Budućnost Banovići	2006		1	0
25	Mariusz Jop	(Poland)	DF	3 August 1978 (aged 29)	Wisła Kraków	2004		69	4
32	Nikita Korolyov	(Russia)	DF	15 March 1988 (aged 19)	Youth Team	2007		0	0
33	Andrei Moiseyenkov	(Russia)	DF	5 January 1987 (aged 20)	Youth Team	2005		2	0
37	Kirill Loskutov	(Russia)	DF	29 April 1988 (aged 19)	Youth Team	2007		0	0
44	Aleksandr Ponomaryov	(Russia)	DF	25 January 1986 (aged 21)	Dynamo Moscow	2005		0	0
49	Pyotr Marshinskiy	(Russia)	DF	18 February 1986 (aged 21)	Youth Team	2005		2	0
55	Aleksandr Sukhov	(Russia)	DF	3 January 1986 (aged 21)	Youth Team	2004		3	0
Midfielders
3	Pablo Barrientos	(Argentina)	MF	17 January 1985 (aged 22)	San Lorenzo	2006		39	10
5	Radu Rebeja	(Moldova)	MF	8 June 1973 (aged 34)	Saturn Ramenskoye	2004		119	3
6	Pyotr Bystrov	(Russia)	MF	15 July 1979 (aged 28)	Saturn Ramenskoye	2006		63	9
7	Damian Gorawski	(Poland)	MF	4 January 1979 (aged 28)	Wisła Kraków	2005		47	1
9	Sergei Semak	(Russia)	MF	27 February 1976 (aged 31)	Paris Saint-Germain	2006		73	15
10	Maximiliano Moralez	(Argentina)	MF	27 February 1987 (aged 20)	Racing Club	2007	2011	7	0
11	Tomáš Čížek	(Czech Republic)	MF	27 November 1978 (aged 28)	Rubin Kazan	2006		60	4
17	Pavel Golyshev	(Russia)	MF	7 July 1987 (aged 20)	Youth Team	2005		18	2
20	Aleksei Melyoshin	(Russia)	MF	30 January 1976 (aged 31)	Dynamo St.Petersburg	2004		82	11
47	Artyom Varakin	(Russia)	MF	21 April 1987 (aged 20)	Youth Team	2006		2	0
77	Stanislav Ivanov	(Moldova)	MF	7 October 1980 (aged 27)	Sheriff Tiraspol	2004		105	6
Forwards
18	Maxi López	(Argentina)	FW	3 April 1984 (aged 23)	Barcelona	2007		10	6
19	Héctor Bracamonte	(Argentina)	FW	16 February 1978 (aged 29)	Boca Juniors	2004		110	23
21	Roman Adamov	(Russia)	FW	21 June 1982 (aged 25)	Terek Grozny	2006		68	26
28	Branislav Krunić	(Bosnia and Herzegovina)	FW	28 January 1979 (aged 28)	Tom Tomsk	2007	2007 (+2)	28	3
35	Dmitry Golubov	(Russia)	FW	24 June 1985 (aged 22)	Tekstilshchik Kamyshin	2005		34	3
43	Stanislav Lantsov	(Russia)	FW	22 September 1990 (aged 17)	Youth Team	2007		0	0
45	Pavel Yesikov	(Russia)	FW	29 January 1988 (aged 19)	Youth Team	2006		0	0
48	Aleksei Marshinskiy	(Russia)	FW	17 April 1988 (aged 19)	Youth Team	2007		0	0
51	Aleksandr Marenich	(Russia)	FW	29 April 1989 (aged 18)	Rostov	2007		0	0
Away on loan
50	Andrei Lukanchenkov	(Russia)	DF	7 February 1986 (aged 21)	Torpedo-Metallurg	2004		4	0
Players that left Moscow during the season
10	Dmitri Kirichenko	(Russia)	FW	17 January 1977 (aged 30)	CSKA Moscow	2005		63	30
18	Andrei Topchu	(Russia)	MF	17 April 1980 (aged 27)	Kuban Krasnodar	2007		4	0

=== On loan ===
Note: Flags indicate national team as defined under FIFA eligibility rules; some limited exceptions apply. Players may hold more than one non-FIFA nationality.

No. / Pos. / Nation / Player; 50 / DF / RUS / Andrei Lukanchenkov (at SKA Rostov)	No. / Pos. / Nation / Player

=== Left club during season ===
Note: Flags indicate national team as defined under FIFA eligibility rules; some limited exceptions apply. Players may hold more than one non-FIFA nationality.

No. / Pos. / Nation / Player; 10 / FW / RUS / Dmitri Kirichenko (to Saturn Ramenskoye)	No. / Pos. / Nation / Player; 18 / MF / RUS / Andrei Topchu (to Kuban Krasnodar)

== Transfers ==
=== In ===
Date	Position	Nationality	Name	From	Fee	Ref.
Winter 2007	GK	(Belarus)	Illya Hawrylaw	Dinamo Minsk	Undisclosed	
Winter 2007	DF	(Czech Republic)	Roman Hubník	Sigma Olomouc	Undisclosed	
23 January 2007	FW	(Bosnia and Herzegovina)	Branislav Krunić	Tom Tomsk	Undisclosed	
26 February 2007	DF	(Moldova)	Alexandru Epureanu	Sheriff Tiraspol	Undisclosed	
26 February 2007	MF	(Russia)	Andrei Topchu	Kuban Krasnodar	Undisclosed	
Summer 2007	FW	(Russia)	Aleksandr Marenich	Rostov	Undisclosed	
8 August 2007	MF	(Argentina)	Maximiliano Moralez	Racing Club	Undisclosed	
16 August 2007	FW	(Argentina)	Maxi López	Barcelona	€2,000,000	

=== Out ===
Date	Position	Nationality	Name	To	Fee	Ref.
6 January 2007	GK	(Russia)	Aleksandr Filimonov	Nea Salamis Famagusta	Undisclosed	
Winter 2007	FW	(Russia)	Dmitri Kirichenko	Saturn Ramenskoye	Undisclosed	
Summer 2007	MF	(Russia)	Andrei Topchu	Kuban Krasnodar	Undisclosed	

=== Loans out ===
Date from	Position	Nationality	Name	To	Date to	Ref.
Winter 2007	DF	(Bosnia and Herzegovina)	Dilaver Zrnanović	Daugava Daugavpils	Summer 2007	
Winter 2007	DF	(Russia)	Andrei Lukanchenkov	SKA Rostov	End of Season	
Winter 2007	DF	(Russia)	Pyotr Marshinskiy	Daugava Daugavpils	Summer 2007	

=== Released ===
Date	Position	Nationality	Name	Joined	Date
31 December 2007	GK	(Russia)	Sergei Kozko	Rubin Kazan	
31 December 2007	DF	(Bosnia and Herzegovina)	Dilaver Zrnanović	MTZ-RIPO Minsk	
31 December 2007	DF	(Russia)	Kirill Loskutov		
31 December 2007	DF	(Russia)	Pyotr Marshinskiy	Nika Moscow	
31 December 2007	DF	(Russia)	Andrei Moiseyenkov	Torpedo-ZIL Moscow	
31 December 2007	DF	(Russia)	Aleksandr Ponomaryov	Rostov	
31 December 2007	DF	(Russia)	Aleksandr Sukhov	Tornado Moscow	
31 December 2007	MF	(Poland)	Damian Gorawski	Shinnik Yaroslavl	
31 December 2007	MF	(Russia)	Sergei Semak	Rubin Kazan	
31 December 2007	FW	(Russia)	Dmitry Golubov	Volga Ulyanovsk	

== Competitions ==
=== Premier League ===
==== Results by round ====
Round	1	2	3	4	5	6	7	8	9	10	11	12	13	14	15	16	17	18	19	20	21	22	23	24	25	26	27	28	29	30
Ground	A	H	A	H	A	H	A	H	A	A	H	A	H	A	H	A	H	A	H	A	H	A	H	H	A	H	A	H	A	H
Result	W	W	D	W	D	W	D	L	L	D	W	D	W	D	L	W	W	L	W	L	L	W	W	W	D	W	L	W	L	W

Updated to match(es) played on 11 November 2007. Source: See Results
A = Away; H = Home; W = Win; D = Draw; L = Loss

==== Results ====
10 March 2007 1	Luch-Energiya Vladivostok	0–1	FC Moscow	Vladivostok
11:00 MSK (UTC+3)	Lobov (yellow card) 80'	Report	Bracamonte (yellow card) 28' (goal) 35'; Stoica (yellow card) 90'	Stadium: Dynamo Stadium; Attendance: 9,300; Referee: Aleksandr Gvardis

17 March 2007 2	FC Moscow	2–0	Tom Tomsk	Moscow
16:00 MSK (UTC+3)	Adamov 6', 28'; Rebeja (yellow card) 47'; Kuzmin (yellow card) 90'	Report	Mostovyi (yellow card) 28'; Klimov (yellow card) 54'; Kulchy (yellow card) 63'; Serdyukov (yellow card) 90'; Vejić (yellow card) 90'	Stadium: Eduard Streltsov Stadium; Attendance: 6,000; Referee: Alexander Evstigneev

31 March 2007 3	Krylia Sovetov	0–0	FC Moscow	Samara
16:00 MSK (UTC+3)	Medvedev (yellow card) 65'; Gadzhiyev (yellow card) 66'; Shvetsov (yellow card) 78'	Report	Barrientos (yellow card) 36'; Bracamonte (yellow card) 58'; Semak (yellow card) 75'	Stadium: Metallurg Stadium; Attendance: 22,500; Referee: Stanislav Sukhina

7 April 2007 4	FC Moscow	1–0	Kuban Krasnodar	Moscow
16:00 MSK (UTC+3)	Bystrov 34' (pen.); Epureanu (yellow card) 78'; Stoica (yellow card) 79'; Gorawski (yellow card) 86'	Report	Kaleshin (yellow card) 37'	Stadium: Eduard Streltsov Stadium; Attendance: 2,000; Referee: Igor Egorov

14 April 2007 5	Rubin Kazan	1–1	Moscow	Kazan
17:00 MSK (UTC+3)	Ryazantsev 11'; Gilmullin (yellow card) 61'; Jean (yellow card) 72'; Sibaya (yellow card) 84'	Report	Semak 22'; Godunok (yellow card) 31'; Barrientos (yellow card) 79'	Stadium: Central Stadium; Attendance: 10,000; Referee: Nikolai Ivanov

22 April 2007 6	FC Moscow	2–1	CSKA Moscow	Moscow
14:00 MSK (UTC+3)	Barrientos (yellow card) 22' (goal) 28'; Bracamonte (yellow card) 43'; Semak 48'; Epureanu (yellow card) 55'; Okoronkwo (yellow card) 89'	Report	Gusev (yellow card) 32'; Rahimić (yellow card) 40'; Vágner Love 43'	Stadium: Eduard Streltsov Stadium; Attendance: 9,000; Referee: Aleksandr Gvardis

28 April 2007 7	Lokomotiv Moscow	1–1	FC Moscow	Moscow
19:00 MSK (UTC+3)	Sennikov (yellow card) 30'; Spahić (yellow card) 32'; Ivanović 73'	Report	Bracamonte 19' (yellow card) 35'; Rebeja (yellow card) 52'; Adamov (red card) 90'	Stadium: RZD Arena; Attendance: 12,082; Referee: Stanislav Sukhina

6 May 2007 8	FC Moscow	0–2	Khimki	Moscow
MSK (UTC+3)	Epureanu (yellow card) 72'	Report	Čeh 26' (pen.); Arkhipov 31'; Vorobyov (yellow card) 90+'	Stadium: Eduard Streltsov Stadium; Attendance: 3,000; Referee: Yuri Klyuchnikov

12 May 2007 9	Spartak Nalchik	1–0	FC Moscow	Nalchik
19:00 MSK (UTC+3)	Filatov (yellow card) 17'; Amisulashvili (yellow card) 59'; Hubník 65' (o.g.)	Report	Hubník (yellow card) 45'; Barrientos (yellow card) 60' (red card) 74'; Jop (yellow card) 73'	Stadium: Spartak Stadium; Attendance: 12,500; Referee: Alexander Gonchar

20 May 2007 10	Dynamo Moscow	0–0	FC Moscow	Moscow
19:00 MSK (UTC+3)	Klimavičius (yellow card) 60'; Kolodin (yellow card) 87'; Pimenov (yellow card) 90+'	Report	Bystrov (yellow card) 61'; Rebeja (yellow card) 67'	Stadium: Dynamo Stadium; Attendance: 8,000; Referee: Kolobaev

26 May 2007 11	FC Moscow	3–2	Saturn Ramenskoye	Moscow
MSK (UTC+3)	Semak 48'; Epureanu (yellow card) 58'; Barrientos 62'; Ivanov 67'	Report	Igonin (yellow card) 27'; Česnauskis 50'; Karyaka 82'	Stadium: Eduard Streltsov Stadium; Attendance: 3,000; Referee: Aleksandr Gvardis

10 June 2007 12	Rostov	1–1	FC Moscow	Rostov-on-Don
21:00 MSK (UTC+3)	Kanyenda 70'; Amelyanchuk (yellow card) 76'	Report	Topchu (yellow card) 4'; Adamov 29' (yellow card) 44'; Jop (yellow card) 59'; Godunok (yellow card) 67'; Epureanu (yellow card) 74'	Stadium: Olimp-2; Attendance: 7,500; Referee: Nikolai Ivanov

17 June 2007 13	FC Moscow	2–0	Spartak Moscow	Moscow
14:00 MSK (UTC+3)	Semak 5'; Ivanov (yellow card) 24'; Adamov 34'	Report	V.Bystrov (yellow card) 41'; Pavlyuchenko (yellow card) 45'	Stadium: Eduard Streltsov Stadium; Attendance: 10,000; Referee: Gerald Lehner

24 June 2007 14	Amkar Perm	1–1	FC Moscow	Perm
16:00 MSK (UTC+3)	Sirakov (yellow card) 34'; Kushev 90'	Report	Kuzmin (yellow card) 23'; Jop (yellow card) 44'; Golyshev 47'; Stoica (yellow card) 75'	Stadium: Zvezda Stadium; Attendance: 18,000; Referee: Aleksandr Gvardis

1 July 2007 15	FC Moscow	0–3	Zenit St.Petersburg	Moscow
14:00 MSK (UTC+3)	Ivanov (yellow card) 7'; Adamov 50'; Barrientos (yellow card) 74'; Bystrov (yellow card) 90'	Report	Arshavin 9'; Križanac (yellow card) 34' (yellow-red card) 56'; Tymoshchuk 43'; Anyukov (yellow card) 66'; Hagen (yellow card) 74'; Ricksen (yellow card) 79'; Škrtel (yellow card) 89'; Malafeev (yellow card) 90'	Stadium: Eduard Streltsov Stadium; Attendance: 6,000; Referee: Igor Egorov
Note: Zenit were awarded a 3-0 technical win after FC Moscow fielded Roman Hubník who was ineligible.

15 July 2007 16	Tom Tomsk	1–2	FC Moscow	Tomsk
14:00 MSK (UTC+3)	Kiselyov 19'; Vejić (yellow card) 64'; Catînsus (yellow card) 81'; Mladenov (yellow card) 90'	Report	Barrientos 36'; Bystrov 46'; Adamov (yellow card) 64'; Godunok (yellow card) 66'	Stadium: Trud Stadium; Attendance: 14,500; Referee: Nikolai Ivanov

22 July 2007 17	FC Moscow	3–1	Krylia Sovetov	Moscow
MSK (UTC+3)	Adamov 6' (pen.), 64'; Jop (yellow card) 43'; Barrientos 84'	Report	Trifonov 2'; Mujiri (yellow card) 80'	Stadium: Eduard Streltsov Stadium; Attendance: 3,500; Referee: Vitali Doroshenko

29 July 2007 18	Kuban Krasnodar	4–1	FC Moscow	Krasnodar
20:00 MSK (UTC+3)	Orekhov (yellow card) 13'; Jefthon (yellow card) 42'; Kuzmichyov 49', 63'; Baiano 52'; Tlisov 85'	Report	Čížek 76'	Stadium: Kuban Stadium; Attendance: 13,000; Referee: Alexander Evstigneev

5 August 2007 19	Moscow	2–1	Rubin Kazan	Moscow
17:00 MSK (UTC+3)	Bystrov 5' (yellow card) 28'; Godunok (yellow card) 35'; Čížek (yellow card) 59'; Semak 82' (yellow card) 84'	Report	Budylin 11' (pen.); Jean (yellow card) 56'; Kireyev (yellow card) 62'; Ayupov (yellow card) 80'	Stadium: Eduard Streltsov Stadium; Attendance: 3,500; Referee: Nikolai Ivanov

12 August 2007 20	CSKA Moscow	2–0	FC Moscow	Moscow
14:00 MSK (UTC+3)	Mamayev (yellow card) 43'; Ignashevich 52'; Rahimić (yellow card) 55'; Šemberas (yellow card) 58'; Vágner Love 87'	Report	Barrientos (yellow card) 56'; Adamov (yellow card) 58'; Bystrov (yellow card) 65'	Stadium: Dynamo Stadium; Attendance: 12,000; Referee: Aleksandr Kolobaev

19 August 2007 21	FC Moscow	1–2	Lokomotiv Moscow	Moscow
18:00 MSK (UTC+3)	Adamov 33'; Ivanov (yellow card) 49'	Report	Traoré 44'; Sychev 53'	Stadium: Eduard Streltsov Stadium; Attendance: 8,000; Referee: Yuri Baskakov

26 August 2007 22	Khimki	1–3	FC Moscow	Khimki
18:00 MSK (UTC+3)	Antipenko 32'; Orlov (yellow card) 67'; Trivunović (yellow card) 72'	Report	Adamov 17', 57' (pen.), 82' (pen.); Epureanu (yellow card) 68'; Amelchenko (yellow card) 80'; Barrientos (yellow card) 85'	Stadium: Arena Khimki; Attendance: 5,250; Referee: Alexander Gonchar

31 August 2007 23	FC Moscow	1–0	Spartak Nalchik	Moscow
19:00 MSK (UTC+3)	Bystrov (yellow card) 42'; López 61'; Čížek (yellow card) 75'	Report	Rodenkov (yellow card) 43'	Stadium: Eduard Streltsov Stadium; Attendance: 3,800; Referee: Alexei Kovalev

22 September 2007 24	FC Moscow	4–1	Dynamo Moscow	Moscow
14:00 MSK (UTC+3)	Adamov 21'; Epureanu (yellow card) 39'; Čížek 45+'; Barrientos (yellow card) 58'; Bystrov 82'; Ivanov 83'	Report	Danny (yellow card) 25'; K.Kombarov 31'; Kolodin (penalty missed) 59'	Stadium: Eduard Streltsov Stadium; Attendance: 8,000; Referee: Aleksei Nikolaev

30 September 2007 25	Saturn Ramenskoye	0–0	FC Moscow	Ramenskoye
15:15 MSK (UTC+3)	Ďurica (yellow card) 83'; Gogua (yellow card) 90+'; Kirichenko (yellow card) 90+'	Report	Ivanov (yellow card) 35'; Bystrov (yellow card) 52'; Čížek (yellow card) 55'; Krunić (yellow card) 83'	Stadium: Saturn Stadium; Attendance: 12,500; Referee: Igor Egorov

6 October 2007 26	FC Moscow	1–0	Rostov	Moscow
15:00 MSK (UTC+3)	Kuzmin (yellow card) 24'; López 65'; Bystrov (yellow card) 90+'	Report	Kalachev (yellow card) 20'; Mogilevskiy (yellow card) 39'; Bochkov (yellow card) 61'	Stadium: Eduard Streltsov Stadium; Attendance: 3,500; Referee: Alexei Kovalev

20 October 2007 27	Spartak Moscow	3–1	FC Moscow	Moscow
14:00 MSK (UTC+3)	Dedura 14' (red card) 16'; Géder 61'; Welliton 90'	Report	Semak (yellow card) 11'; Barrientos (yellow card) 14' (red card) 16'; López 21'; Ivanov (yellow card) 28'; Bracamonte (yellow card) 84'	Stadium: Luzhniki Stadium; Attendance: 28,000; Referee: Yuri Baskakov

27 October 2007 28	FC Moscow	3–1	Amkar Perm	Moscow
15:00 MSK (UTC+3)	López 29', 44', 64' (yellow card) 56'; Okoronkwo (yellow card) 73'	Report	Cherenchikov 40' (yellow card) 56'	Stadium: Eduard Streltsov Stadium; Attendance: 7,000; Referee: Alexander Evstigneev

3 November 2007 29	Zenit St.Petersburg	1–0	FC Moscow	Saint Petersburg
14:00 MSK (UTC+3)	Arshavin 20'	Report	Ivanov (yellow card) 22' (yellow-red card) 90+'; Bystrov (yellow card) 44'; López (yellow card) 72'; Moralez (yellow card) 84'	Stadium: Petrovsky Stadium; Attendance: 19,500; Referee: Aleksandr Gvardis

11 November 2007 30	FC Moscow	3–1	Luch-Energiya Vladivostok	Moscow
14:00 MSK (UTC+3)	Adamov 4', 85'; Stoica (yellow card) 30'; Krunić 81'	Report	Shtanyuk (yellow card) 33'; Astafyev 50'	Stadium: Eduard Streltsov Stadium; Attendance: 4,000; Referee: Stanislav Sukhina

==== League table ====
Pos	Team	Pld	W	D	L	GF	GA	GD	Pts	Qualification or relegation
2	Spartak Moscow	30	17	8	5	50	30	+20	59	Qualification to Champions League third qualifying round
3	CSKA Moscow	30	14	11	5	43	24	+19	53	Qualification to UEFA Cup first round (Note: Qualified as the winner of 2007–08 Russian Cup)
4	FC Moscow	30	15	7	8	40	32	+8	52	Qualification to UEFA Cup second qualifying round
5	Saturn	30	11	12	7	34	28	+6	45	Qualification to Intertoto Cup second round
6	Dynamo Moscow	30	11	8	11	37	35	+2	41	

Source: RFPL
Rules for classification: 1st points; 2nd matches won; 3rd goal difference; 4th head-to-head (points, matches won, goal difference, goals scored, away goals scored); 5th goals scored; 6th away goals scored; 7th drawing of lots

=== Russian Cup ===
==== 2006–07 ====
26 February 2007 Round of 16 1st leg	FC Moscow	3–0	Amkar Perm	Moscow
14:00 MSK (UTC+3)	Bystrov (yellow card) 49'; Barrientos 55' (yellow card) 64'; Krunić 81'; Bystrov 88'	Report	Akhmetzyanov (yellow card) 34'	Stadium: Dynamo Stadium; Attendance: 800; Referee: Igor Egorov
Note: Match played at the Dynamo Stadium in Moscow, instead of FC Moscow's regular Eduard Streltsov Stadium in Moscow.

4 March 2007 Round of 16 2nd leg	Amkar Perm	2–3 (2–6 agg.)	FC Moscow	Perm
16:00 MSK (UTC+3)	Savin 19', 28'; Volkov (yellow card) 70'; Popov (yellow card) 86'	Report	Semak 15'; Krunić (penalty missed) 24'; Bracamonte 24'; Barrientos 66'; Bystrov (yellow card) 77'; Epureanu (yellow card) 90'	Stadium: Zvezda Stadium; Attendance: 9,200; Referee: Yuri Klyuchnikov

4 April 2007 Quarterfinal 1st leg	FC Moscow	3–2	Krylia Sovetov	Moscow
19:00 MSK (UTC+3)	Okoronkwo (yellow card) 4'; Adamov 20'; Krunić 84'; Rebeja (yellow card) 88'; Barrientos 90+3'	Report	Godunok 26' (o.g.); Fileković (yellow card) 42' (yellow-red card) 61'; Vasilyev (yellow card) 49'; Łągiewka (yellow card) 66'; Bobyor 84' (pen.); Makarov (yellow card) FT	Stadium: Eduard Streltsov Stadium; Attendance: 2,000; Referee: Aleksandr Gonchar

18 April 2007 Quarterfinal 2nd leg	Krylia Sovetov	0–2 (2–5 agg.)	FC Moscow	Samara
17:00 MSK (UTC+3)	Shevchenko (yellow card) 26'; Branco (yellow card) 90+'	Report	Hubník 35'; Gorawski (yellow card) 35'; Okoronkwo (yellow card) 46'; Bracamonte 87'	Stadium: Metallurg Stadium; Attendance: 11,000; Referee: Eduard Malyi

2 May 2007 Semifinal 1st leg	Dynamo Bryansk	1–1	FC Moscow	Bryansk
18:00 MSK (UTC+3)	Bouli (yellow card) 37' (goal) 57'	Report	Epureanu (yellow card) 5'; Krunić (yellow card) 20'; Adamov (yellow card) 30'; Semak 36'; Kuzmin (yellow card) 87'	Stadium: Dynamo Stadium; Attendance: 10,100; Referee: Aleksandr Evstigneev

8 May 2007 Semifinal 2nd leg	FC Moscow	1–0 (2–1 agg.)	Dynamo Bryansk	Moscow
MSK (UTC+3)	Adamov 60' (pen.); Čížek (yellow card) 89'	Report	Shelyutov (yellow card) 19'; Kutas (yellow card) 33'; Bouli (yellow card) 70'	Stadium: Eduard Streltsov Stadium; Attendance: 4,000; Referee: Nikolai Ivanov

===== Final =====
27 May 2007	FC Moscow	0–1 (a.e.t.)	Lokomotiv Moscow	Moscow
14:00 MSK (UTC+3)	Barrientos (yellow card) 52'; Jop (yellow card) 92'	Report	Yefimov (yellow card) 99'; Loskov (yellow card) 103'; O'Connor 103'	Stadium: Luzhniki Stadium; Attendance: 50,000; Referee: Yuri Baskakov

==== 2007–08 ====
27 June 2007 Round of 32	Nosta Novotroitsk	1–1 (a.e.t.) (2–4 p)	FC Moscow	Novotroitsk
17:00 MSK (UTC+3)	Kuznetsov 29'; Puchkov (yellow card) 42' (yellow-red card) 48'; Nizamutdinov (yellow card) 89'	Report	Semak (yellow card) 45+'; Golyshev (yellow card) 70'; Ivanov 74'	Stadium: Metallurg Stadium; Attendance: 6,060; Referee: Yuri Kunitsa
	Penalties
	Nizamutdinov (penalty missed); Molosh (penalty scored); Surodin (penalty missed); Alexeyev (penalty scored)		(penalty scored) Čížek; (penalty scored) Kuzmin; (penalty scored) Jop; (penalty scored) Golyshev

8 August 2007 Round of 16	KAMAZ	0–1	FC Moscow	Naberezhnye Chelny
18:00 MSK (UTC+3)	Tsorayev (yellow card) 68'; Petrović (penalty missed) 79'; Oganyan (yellow card) 90'	Report	Čížek 9' (yellow card) 90'; Rebeja (yellow card) 29'; Stoica (yellow card) 64'; Bystrov (yellow card) 78'	Stadium: KAMAZ Stadium; Attendance: 9,000; Referee: Igor Egorov

16 September 2007 Quarterfinal	Amkar Perm	2–1	FC Moscow	Perm
16:00 MSK (UTC+3)	Kobenko 2'; Volkov (yellow card) 20'; Dujmović (yellow card) 35'; Kushev 51'; Kobenko (yellow card) 60'	Report	Semak 12'; Nababkin (yellow card) 42'; Barrientos (yellow card) 45'	Stadium: Zvezda Stadium; Attendance: 14,500; Referee: Vitali Doroshenko

== Squad statistics ==
As of match played 11 November 2007

=== Appearances and goals ===
No.	Pos	Nat	Player	Total		Premier League		2007–08 Russian Cup		2007–08 Russian Cup	
No.	Pos	Nat	Player	Apps	Goals	Apps	Goals	Apps	Goals	Apps	Goals
2	DF	(Russia) RUS	Dmitri Godunok	29	0	21+1	0	6	0	1	0
3	MF	(Argentina) ARG	Pablo Barrientos	30	7	22	4	7	3	1	0
4	DF	(Czech Republic) CZE	Roman Hubník	8	1	5	0	2	1	1	0
5	MF	(Moldova) MDA	Radu Rebeja	28	0	13+7	0	6	0	2	0
6	MF	(Russia) RUS	Pyotr Bystrov	31	5	23+2	4	3+1	1	1+1	0
7	MF	(Poland) POL	Damian Gorawski	9	0	2+4	0	3	0	0	0
8	DF	(Moldova) MDA	Pompiliu Stoica	34	0	26+1	0	4	0	2+1	0
9	MF	(Russia) RUS	Sergei Semak	38	8	28+1	5	7	2	2	1
10	MF	(Argentina) ARG	Maximiliano Moralez	7	0	4+2	0	0	0	1	0
11	MF	(Czech Republic) CZE	Tomáš Čížek	29	3	7+16	2	0+4	0	2	1
12	GK	(Russia) RUS	Sergei Kozko	3	0	1	0	1	0	0+1	0
14	DF	(Russia) RUS	Kirill Nababkin	12	0	6+2	0	1	0	3	0
15	DF	(Moldova) MDA	Alexandru Epureanu	28	0	15+7	0	3	0	3	0
16	GK	(Belarus) BLR	Anton Amelchenko	5	0	3+1	0	0	0	1	0
17	MF	(Russia) RUS	Pavel Golyshev	13	1	8+3	1	0	0	1+1	0
18	FW	(Argentina) ARG	Maxi López	10	6	6+3	6	0	0	1	0
19	FW	(Argentina) ARG	Héctor Bracamonte	23	4	9+8	2	6	2	0	0
21	FW	(Russia) RUS	Roman Adamov	35	15	27+1	13	5+1	2	0+1	0
22	DF	(Russia) RUS	Oleg Kuzmin	33	0	24+1	0	7	0	1	0
23	DF	(Nigeria) NGR	Isaac Okoronkwo	17	0	13	0	4	0	0	0
25	DF	(Poland) POL	Mariusz Jop	12	0	9	0	2	0	1	0
28	FW	(Bosnia and Herzegovina) BIH	Branislav Krunić	28	3	7+14	1	2+4	2	0+1	0
30	GK	(Belarus) BLR	Yuri Zhevnov	34	0	26	0	6	0	2	0
35	FW	(Russia) RUS	Dmitry Golubov	15	0	3+4	0	0+6	0	2	0
47	MF	(Russia) RUS	Artyom Varakin	1	0	0	0	0	0	1	0
77	MF	(Moldova) MDA	Stanislav Ivanov	32	3	21+3	2	1+4	0	2+1	1
Players away from the club on loan:
Players who appeared for Moscow but left during the season:
10	FW	(Russia) RUS	Dmitri Kirichenko	1	0	0	0	1	0	0	0
18	MF	(Russia) RUS	Andrei Topchu	4	0	1	0	0+1	0	2	0

=== Goal scorers ===
Place	Position	Nation	Number	Name	Premier League	2006–07 Russian Cup	2007–08 Russian Cup	Total
1	FW	(Russia)	21	Roman Adamov	13	2	0	15
2	MF	(Russia)	9	Sergei Semak	5	2	1	8
3	MF	(Argentina)	3	Pablo Barrientos	4	3	0	7
4	FW	(Argentina)	18	Maxi López	6	0	0	6
5	MF	(Russia)	6	Pyotr Bystrov	4	1	0	5
6	FW	(Argentina)	19	Héctor Bracamonte	2	2	0	4
7	MF	(Czech Republic)	11	Tomáš Čížek	2	0	1	3
7	MF	(Moldova)	77	Stanislav Ivanov	2	0	1	3
7	FW	(Bosnia and Herzegovina)	28	Branislav Krunić	1	2	0	3
10	MF	(Russia)	17	Pavel Golyshev	1	0	0	1
10	DF	(Czech Republic)	4	Roman Hubník	0	1	0	1
Total					40	13	3	56

=== Clean sheets ===
Place	Position	Nation	Number	Name	Premier League	2006–07 Russian Cup	2007–08 Russian Cup	Total
1	GK	(Belarus)	30	Yuri Zhevnov	9	3	0	12
2	GK	(Belarus)	16	Anton Amelchenko	0	0	1	1
TOTALS					9	3	1	13

=== Disciplinary record ===
Number	Nation	Position	Name	Premier League		2006–07 Russian Cup		2007–08 Russian Cup		Total	
Number	Nation	Position	Name	Yellow card	Red card	Yellow card	Red card	Yellow card	Red card	Yellow card	Red card
2	(Russia)	DF	Dmitri Godunok	4	0	0	0	0	0	4	0
3	(Argentina)	MF	Pablo Barrientos	9	2	2	0	1	0	12	2
4	(Czech Republic)	DF	Roman Hubník	1	0	0	0	0	0	1	0
5	(Moldova)	MF	Radu Rebeja	3	0	1	0	1	0	4	0
6	(Russia)	MF	Pyotr Bystrov	8	0	2	0	1	0	11	0
7	(Poland)	MF	Damian Gorawski	1	0	1	0	0	0	2	0
8	(Romania)	DF	Pompiliu Stoica	4	0	0	0	1	0	5	0
9	(Russia)	MF	Sergei Semak	3	0	0	0	1	0	4	0
10	(Argentina)	MF	Maximiliano Moralez	1	0	0	0	0	0	1	0
11	(Czech Republic)	MF	Tomáš Čížek	3	0	1	0	1	0	5	0
14	(Russia)	DF	Kirill Nababkin	0	0	0	0	1	0	1	0
15	(Moldova)	DF	Alexandru Epureanu	7	0	2	0	0	0	9	0
16	(Belarus)	GK	Anton Amelchenko	1	0	0	0	0	0	1	0
17	(Russia)	MF	Pavel Golyshev	0	0	0	0	1	0	1	0
18	(Argentina)	FW	Maxi López	2	0	0	0	0	0	2	0
19	(Argentina)	FW	Héctor Bracamonte	5	0	0	0	0	0	5	0
21	(Russia)	FW	Roman Adamov	3	1	1	0	0	0	4	1
22	(Russia)	DF	Oleg Kuzmin	3	0	1	0	0	0	4	0
23	(Nigeria)	DF	Isaac Okoronkwo	2	0	2	0	0	0	4	0
25	(Poland)	DF	Mariusz Jop	4	0	1	0	0	0	5	0
28	(Bosnia and Herzegovina)	FW	Branislav Krunić	1	0	1	0	0	0	2	0
77	(Moldova)	MF	Stanislav Ivanov	7	1	0	0	0	0	8	1
Players away on loan:
Players who left Moscow during the season:
18	(Russia)	MF	Andrei Topchu	1	0	0	0	0	0	1	0
Total				73	4	15	0	8	0	96	4
