= Yesipenko =

Yesipenko or Esipenko (Ukrainian: Єсипенко, Russian: Есипенко) is a gender-neutral Ukrainian surname. People with that name include:

- Andrey Esipenko (born 2002), Russian chess grandmaster
- Rinat Yesipenko (born 1983), Russian footballer
