= Oktyabrsky, Lyuberetsky District, Moscow Oblast =

Oktyabrsky Октя́брьский
- Urban-type settlement
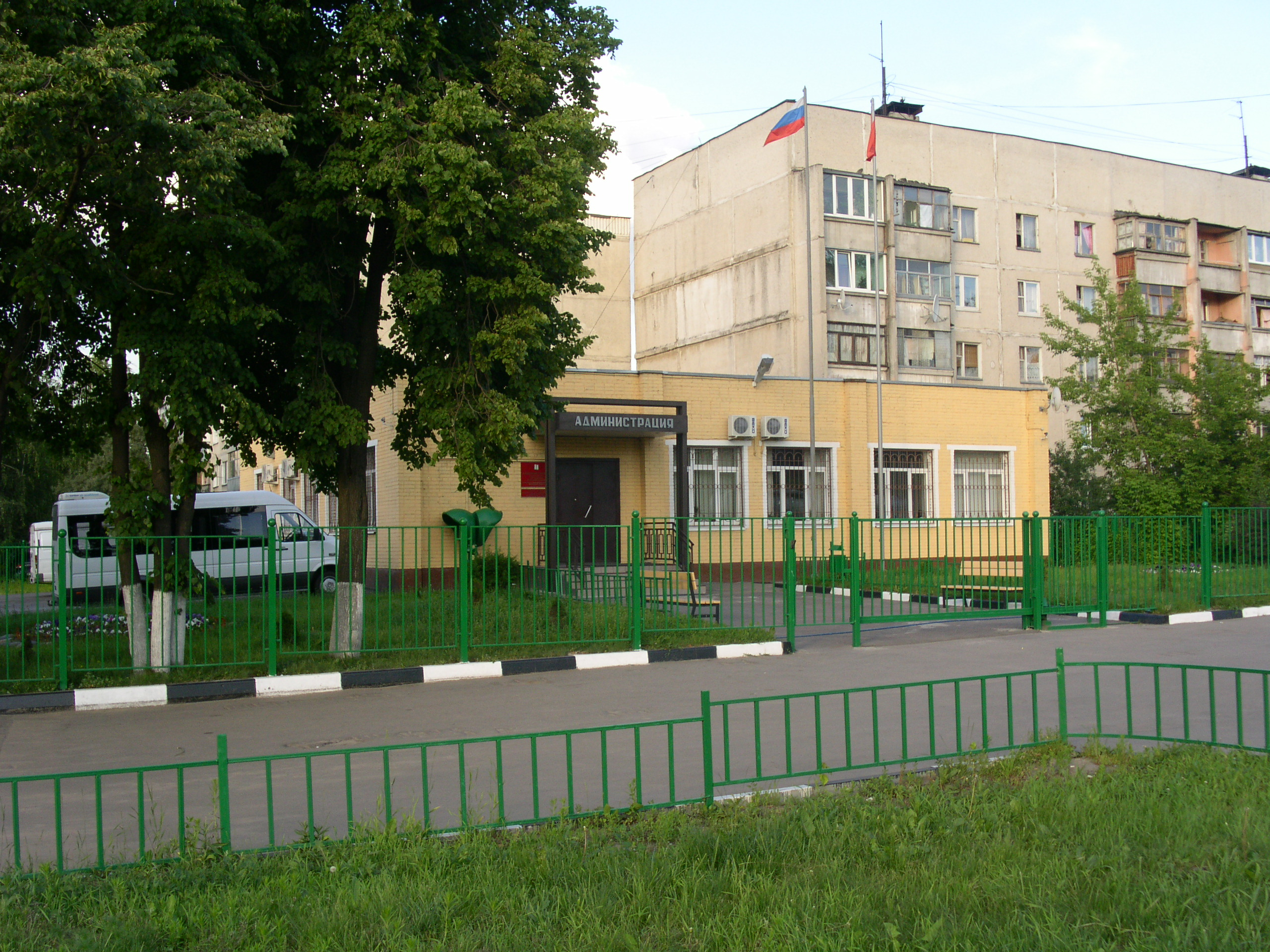
- Oktyabrsky local administration building

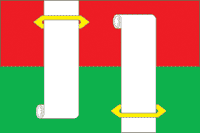
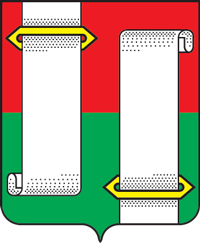
- Flag Coat of arms
- Interactive map of Oktyabrsky
- Location of Oktyabrsky Oktyabrsky (Moscow Oblast)
- Coordinates: 55°36′36″N 37°58′26″E
- Country: Russia
- Federal subject: Moscow Oblast
- Administrative district: Lyuberetsky District

Population (2010 Census)
  - Total: 13,165
  - Estimate (2025): 26,352 (+100.2%)
- Time zone: UTC+3 (MSK)
- Postal code: 140060
- OKTMO ID: 46631170051

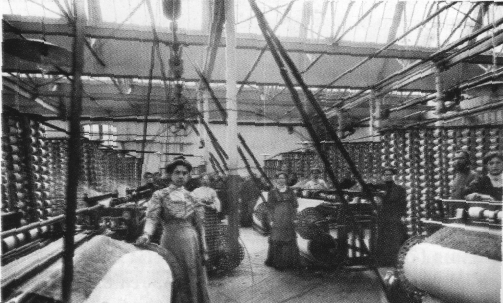
Inside Shorigin's factory, beginning of the 20th century

Oktyabrsky (Russian: Октя́брьский) is an urban locality (a work settlement) in Lyuberetsky District of Moscow Oblast, Russia, located 34 kilometers (21 mi) southeast of Moscow and 14 kilometers (8.7 mi) south of Lyubertsy. Population: 13,165 (2010 census); 10,135 (2002 census); 8,634 (1989 Soviet census).

It has been known since the 18th century, when it was called the village of Balyatino. It was renamed in 1917.

A large textile factory known as Shorigin's factory (renamed Fabrika Oktyabrskoy Revolyutsii in 1917). Known since Peter the Great as the backswords manufacturer, but later production was converted to textile. In 1912, factory invested into the new production lines shipped from United Kingdom and soon became an important one in the region. In time of the second world war the factory produced the camouflage tents for the front line. The factory played unique and important role in the settlement's life throughout the centuries and it was mirrored on the modern coat of arms. Nowadays is known as Textile-Profi trade complex.

There is a history museum.

The Local Government Board of Oktyabrsky is headed by Yury Baydukov since 2000. He was re-elected in 2005.

== See also ==
- Vyacheslav Danilin
