= Javier Mancini =

Uruguayan footballer (born 1978)

Personal information
- Full name: Javier Gustavo Mancini Rios
- Date of birth: 19 January 1978 (age 48)
- Place of birth: Montevideo, Uruguay
- Height: 1.80 m (5 ft 11 in)
- Position: Midfielder

Senior career*
Years	Team	Apps	(Gls)
1998	Wanderers		
1999	Uruguay Montevideo		
1999–2004	Wanderers		
2005	FC Rostov	4	(0)
2007	Técnico Universitario		
2007–2008	Boston River		
- * Club domestic league appearances and goals

Javier Gustavo Mancini Rios (born 19 January 1978) is a former Uruguayan football player.
