= Andrei Topchu =

Russian footballer

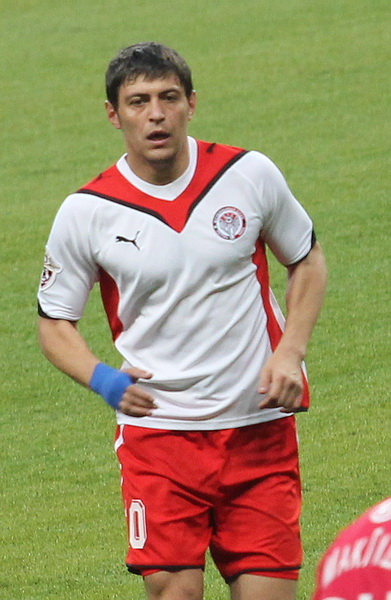

Personal information
- Full name: Andrei Vladimirovich Topchu
- Date of birth: 17 April 1980 (age 46)
- Place of birth: Krasnodar, Russia
- Height: 1.81 m (5 ft 11 in)
- Position: Midfielder

Senior career*
Years	Team	Apps	(Gls)
- FC Vagonnik Krasnodar
2001	FC Krasnodar-2000	37	(11)
2002–2006	FC Kuban Krasnodar	123	(11)
2007	FC Moscow	1	(0)
2007–2009	FC Kuban Krasnodar	65	(2)
2010–2012	FC Amkar Perm	21	(2)
2018	FC Kuban Krasnodar (amateur)		
- * Club domestic league appearances and goals

Andrei Vladimirovich Topchu (Russian: Андрей Владимирович Топчу; born 17 April 1980) is a former Russian football player.

== Career ==
He made his debut in the Russian Premier League in 2004 with FC Kuban Krasnodar.
