= Vitali Streltsov =

Russian footballer

Personal information
- Full name: Vitali Sergeyevich Streltsov
- Date of birth: 24 February 1982 (age 44)
- Place of birth: Krasnodar, Russian SFSR
- Height: 1.78 m (5 ft 10 in)
- Positions: Midfielder; forward

Youth career
- 1995: DYuSSh Ust-Labinsk
- 1996–2000: FC Rotor Volgograd

Senior career*
Years	Team	Apps	(Gls)
1999	MKK Korenovsk		
2001–2002	FC Zhemchuzhina Sochi	27	(0)
2003–2004	FC Krasnodar-2000	56	(7)
2005	FC Dynamo Makhachkala	39	(1)
2006	FC Baltika Kaliningrad	6	(0)
2006	FC Dynamo Stavropol	8	(2)
2007	FC Krasnodar-2000	21	(1)
2008	FC Dynamo Krasnodar		
2009	FC Stavropolye-2009	29	(2)
2010	FC SKA Rostov-on-Don	15	(1)
2010	FC Dynamo-Biolog Novokubansk (amateur)		
2011–2012	FC GNS-Spartak Krasnodar		
2014	FC Afips-2 Afipsky		
2017	FC Magnat Krasnodar		
2019	FC Magnat Krasnodar		
- * Club domestic league appearances and goals

Vitali Sergeyevich Streltsov (Russian: Виталий Серге́евич Стрельцов; born 24 February 1982) is a Russian former professional football player.

== Club career ==
He played two seasons in the Russian Football National League for FC Dynamo Makhachkala and FC Baltika Kaliningrad.
