= Aleksei Puchkov =

Russian footballer

Personal information
- Full name: Aleksei Aleksandrovich Puchkov
- Date of birth: 10 November 1982 (age 43)
- Place of birth: Leningrad, Russian SFSR
- Height: 1.79 m (5 ft 10 1/2 in)
- Position: Defender

Youth career
- Kirovets-Nadezhda Saint Petersburg

Senior career*
Years	Team	Apps	(Gls)
2003	FC Pikalyovo	26	(0)
2004–2005	FC Petrotrest St. Petersburg	64	(0)
2006–2007	FC Nosta Novotroitsk	39	(1)
2008	FC Metallurg-Kuzbass Novokuznetsk	39	(0)
2009	FC Chernomorets Novorossiysk	32	(0)
2010	FC Tyumen	20	(0)
2011–2012	FC Metallurg-Kuzbass Novokuznetsk	19	(0)
2012	FC Kaluga	14	(0)
2013–2014	FC Piter St. Petersburg	10	(0)
2014–2015	FC Novokuznetsk	34	(1)
- * Club domestic league appearances and goals

Aleksei Aleksandrovich Puchkov (Russian: Алексей Александрович Пучков; born 10 November 1982) is a former Russian professional football player.

== Club career ==
He played 4 seasons in the Russian Football National League for 4 different clubs.
