= Maksim Klikin =

Russian footballer

Personal information
- Full name: Maksim Nikolayevich Klikin
- Date of birth: 30 April 1981 (age 45)
- Place of birth: Moscow, Russian SFSR
- Height: 1.91 m (6 ft 3 in)
- Position: Goalkeeper

Senior career*
Years	Team	Apps	(Gls)
1999–2000	FC Dynamo-2 Moscow	5	(0)
2002	FC Mostransgaz Gazoprovod	26	(0)
2003–2004	FC Arsenal Tula	34	(0)
2005	FC Moscow	0	(0)
2005	FC Metallurg-Kuzbass Novokuznetsk	21	(0)
2006	FC Spartak Nizhny Novgorod	5	(0)
2007	FC Reutov	26	(0)
2008	FC Zvezda Irkutsk	9	(0)
2008–2009	FC MVD Rossii Moscow	19	(0)
2009	FC Salyut-Energia Belgorod	0	(0)
2010	FC Metallurg Lipetsk	7	(0)
2010–2011	FC Fakel Voronezh	19	(0)
2012–2015	FC Arsenal Tula	5	(0)
- * Club domestic league appearances and goals

Maksim Nikolayevich Klikin (Russian: Максим Николаевич Кликин; born 30 April 1981) is a former Russian professional football player.

== Club career ==
He made his Russian Football National League debut for FC Arsenal Tula on 28 March 2004 in a game against FC Metallurg Lipetsk.
