= Krzysztof Łągiewka =

Polish footballer (born 1983)

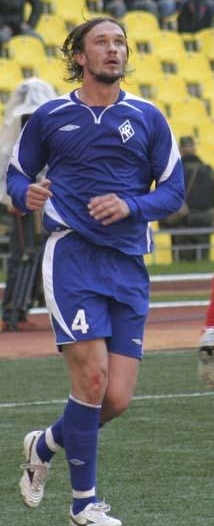

Personal information
- Date of birth: 23 January 1983 (age 43)
- Place of birth: Kolno, Poland
- Height: 1.94 m (6 ft 4 1/2 in)
- Position: Defender

Youth career
- 1998–1999: Olimpia Zambrów

Senior career*
Years	Team	Apps	(Gls)
2000–2002	Jagiellonia Białystok	64	(2)
2002–2003	Skonto Riga	12	(0)
2004–2005	Shinnik Yaroslavl	42	(3)
2006–2008	Krylia Sovetov Samara	58	(4)
2008–2009	Kuban Krasnodar	11	(2)
2010	Krylia Sovetov Samara (ME)	5	(0)
2011–2012	Arka Gdynia	10	(0)
2012–2013	SC Vistula Garfield	6	(0)

International career
- Poland U16
Medal record
Men's football
Representing Poland
UEFA European Under-16 Championship
Runner-up	1999 Czech Republic
- * Club domestic league appearances and goals

Krzysztof Łągiewka (born 23 January 1983) is a Polish former professional footballer who played as a defender.

== Career ==
=== Club ===
In July 2011, he joined Arka Gdynia on a one-year contract.

=== International ===
He was a member of Poland's U16 national football team which placed second in the UEFA European U-16 European Championships in 1999. Leo Beenhakker has also called him up twice to the senior Poland national football team but Łągiewka had to pull out on both occasions.

== Honours ==
Skonto Riga

- Latvian Higher League: 2002, 2003
- Latvian Football Cup: 2002

Poland U16

- UEFA European Under-16 Championship runner-up: 1999
