= Igor Budiša =

Croatian footballer (born 1977)

Personal information
- Date of birth: 23 September 1977 (age 49)
- Place of birth: Osijek, Croatia
- Height: 1.88 m (6 ft 2 in)
- Position: Defender

Team information
- Current team: NK BSK (manager)

Youth career
- –1996: Osijek

Senior career*
| Years | Team | Apps | (Gls) |
| 1995–1996 | Osijek | 0 | (0) |
| 1996–1997 | INKER | 6 | (0) |
| 1997–2000 | Marsonia | | |
| 2000–2001 | Eintracht Trier | 26 | (1) |
| 2001–2002 | 1. FC Saarbrücken | 6 | (0) |
| 2002 | 1. FC Schweinfurt 05 | 9 | (0) |
| 2002 | Zalaegerszeg | 10 | (0) |
| 2002–2003 | Panachaiki | 13 | (1) |
| 2003–2004 | Skoda Xanthi | 11 | (1) |
| 2004–2005 | Eintracht Trier | 35 | (1) |
| 2005–2007 | Shinnik Yaroslavl | 28 | (2) |
| 2007 | Qingdao Jonoon | 25 | (1) |
| 2008 | Jiangsu Sainty | 20 | (2) |
| 2009–2010 | Šibenik | 23 | (1) |
| 2010–2011 | RNK Split | 40 | (1) |
| 2012 | Osijek | 0 | (0) |

Managerial career
- 2022: Đakovo Croatia
- 2022-: Međimurje
- * Club domestic league appearances and goals as of 16 January 2012

Igor Budiša (born 23 September 1977 in Osijek) is a Croatian retired football player and current manager of Croatian third-tier side Međimurje.

== Club career ==
During his career Budiša played for a number of clubs in Croatia, Germany, Hungary, Greece, Russia and China.
