= Artyom Varakin =

Russian footballer

Personal information
- Full name: Artyom Igorevich Varakin
- Date of birth: 21 April 1987 (age 39)
- Place of birth: Volgograd, Russian SFSR
- Height: 1.89 m (6 ft 2 in)
- Position: Midfielder

Youth career
- Kirovets Volgograd
- FC Rotor Volgograd

Senior career*
Years	Team	Apps	(Gls)
2005–2009	FC Moscow	2	(0)
2009	→ FC Volgar-Gazprom Astrakhan (loan)	30	(1)
2010	FC Istra	26	(0)
2011–2012	FC Olimpia Gelendzhik	31	(3)
2012	FC Lyubertsy		
2013–2014	FC Olimp-SKOPA Zheleznodorozhny		
2015	FC Lyubertsy		
2016–2017	FC Olimp-SKOPA Balashikha		
- * Club domestic league appearances and goals

Artyom Igorevich Varakin (Russian: Артём Игоревич Варакин; born 21 April 1987) is a Russian former footballer.
