= Rinat Yesipenko =

Russian and Ukrainian footballer

Personal information
- Full name: Rinat Aleksandrovich Yesipenko
- Date of birth: 22 October 1983 (age 43)
- Place of birth: Voroshylovhrad, Ukrainian SSR
- Height: 1.90 m (6 ft 3 in)
- Position: Goalkeeper

Youth career
- FC Shakhtar Donetsk

Senior career*
Years	Team	Apps	(Gls)
2000–2001	FC Shakhtar-2 Donetsk	0	(0)
2000–2002	FC Shakhtar-3 Donetsk	3	(0)
2004–2005	FC Moscow	0	(0)
2005	FC Krylia Sovetov Moscow		
2006	FC Spartak Shchyolkovo	1	(0)
2007	FC Smena Komsomolsk-na-Amure	25	(0)
2008	FC Alnas Almetyevsk	17	(0)
2009	FC Tyumen	17	(0)
2010	FC Smena Komsomolsk-na-Amure	25	(0)
2012	FC Amur-2010 Blagoveshchensk	5	(0)
2012–2013	FC Shakhtyor Peshelan		
2014	FC Shakhtyor Prokopyevsk (amateur)		
- * Club domestic league appearances and goals

Rinat Aleksandrovich Yesipenko or Rinat Oleksandrovych Yesipenko (Russian: Ринат Александрович Есипенко; Ukrainian: Рінат Олександрович Єсіпенко; born 22 October 1983) is a former Russian and Ukrainian professional football player.

== Club career ==
He played in the Ukrainian Second League for FC Shakhtar-3 Donetsk in 2001.
