= Valeri Leonov =

Russian footballer

Personal information
- Full name: Valeri Viktorovich Leonov
- Date of birth: 17 September 1980 (age 46)
- Place of birth: Moscow, Russian SFSR
- Height: 1.72 m (5 ft 7 1/2 in)
- Position: Midfielder

Youth career
- FShM-Torpedo Moscow

Senior career*
Years	Team	Apps	(Gls)
1999	FC Torpedo-ZIL Moscow	0	(0)
1999	FC Krasnoznamensk (amateur)		
2001–2006	FC Moscow	81	(7)
2005	→ FC Tom Tomsk (loan)	4	(1)
2006	→ FC Terek Grozny (loan)	20	(2)
2007	FC Sibir Novosibirsk	10	(0)
2008	FK Rīga	16	(1)
2008	FC Dynamo Barnaul	15	(3)
2009	FC Torpedo Vladimir	30	(3)
2010–2011	FC Prialit Reutov		
2011–2012	FC Oka Stupino (amateur)		
- * Club domestic league appearances and goals

Valeri Viktorovich Leonov (Russian: Валерий Викторович Леонов; born 17 September 1980) is a former Russian professional football player.

== Club career ==
He made his debut in the Russian Premier League in 2001 for FC Torpedo-ZIL Moscow.
