= Vyacheslav Danilin =

Russian association football player

Personal information
- Full name: Vyacheslav Vyacheslavovich Danilin
- Date of birth: 14 March 1984 (age 42)
- Place of birth: Oktyabrsky, Soviet Union
- Height: 1.72 m (5 ft 8 in)
- Position: Defensive midfielder

Senior career*
Years	Team	Apps	(Gls)
2002–2003	FC Torpedo-Metallurg Moscow	0	(0)
2004	→ FC Fakel Voronezh (loan)	4	(0)
2005–2006	FC Moscow	9	(0)
2007–2009	Dinaburg FC	38	(1)
2010	FC Gazovik Orenburg	22	(0)
2011–2012	FC Salyut Belgorod	33	(3)
2012–2013	FC Zenit Penza	23	(1)
2014–2015	FC Ryazan	38	(8)
2015–2017	FC Solyaris Moscow	50	(10)
2017–2019	FC Veles Moscow	44	(6)

International career
2004	Russia U-21	3	(0)
- * Club domestic league appearances and goals

Vyacheslav Vyacheslavovich Danilin (Russian: Вячесла́в Вячесла́вович Дани́лин; born 14 March 1984) is a Russian former association football player.

== Playing career ==
Danilin previously played for FC Moscow in the Russian Premier League and Dinaburg FC.

2002	FC Moscow	Russian Premier League 1st level	0/0
2003	FC Moscow	Russian Premier League 1st level	0/0
2004	Fakel Voronezh (loan)	Russian Second Division 3rd level	4/0
2004	FC Moscow	Russian Premier League 1st level	0/0
2005	FC Moscow	Russian Premier League 1st level	7/0
2006	FC Moscow	Russian Premier League 1st level	2/0
2007	FK Daugava Daugavpils	Latvian Higher League 1st level	unknown

* - played games and goals
