= Ivan Bakulin (footballer) =

Russian footballer

Personal information
- Full name: Ivan Vladimirovich Bakulin
- Date of birth: 16 April 1986 (age 40)
- Place of birth: Moscow, Russia
- Height: 1.88 m (6 ft 2 in)
- Positions: Defender; midfielder

Youth career
- FC Torpedo-Metallurg Moscow

Senior career*
Years	Team	Apps	(Gls)
2002–2006	FC Moscow	0	(0)
2006	FC Metallurg Krasnoyarsk	11	(0)
2008	FC Alyans-CSKA Vnukovo		
2008	FC Lukhovitsy	6	(0)
2009	FC Torpedo-ZIL Moscow	15	(0)
2009	FC Istra	9	(0)
2010	FC Torpedo Lyuberetsky Rayon		
- * Club domestic league appearances and goals

Ivan Vladimirovich Bakulin (Russian: Иван Владимирович Бакулин; born 16 April 1986) is a former Russian professional football player.

== Club career ==
He made his debut for FC Moscow on 31 July 2004 in a Russian Cup game against FC Yelets.

He played seasons in the Russian Football National League for FC Metallurg Krasnoyarsk in 2006.
