= Maksym Biletskyi =

Ukrainian footballer

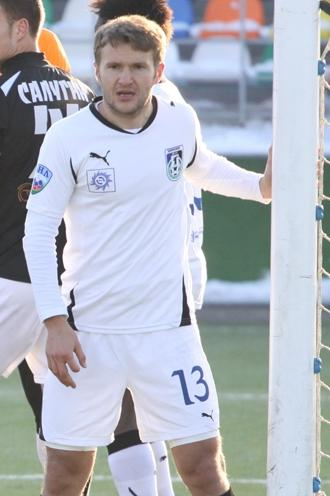
- With Shinnik in 2012

Personal information
- Full name: Maksym Andriyovych Biletskyi
- Date of birth: 7 January 1980 (age 46)
- Place of birth: Romny, Soviet Union
- Height: 1.74 m (5 ft 8 1/2 in)
- Position: Midfielder

Senior career*
Years	Team	Apps	(Gls)
1998–2000	PFC CSKA-2 Moscow	96	(6)
2000–2001	PFC CSKA Moscow	7	(0)
2001–2005	FC Moscow	96	(6)
2006	FC Rostov	19	(1)
2007–2009	FC Chornomorets Odesa	65	(1)
2010–2014	FC Shinnik Yaroslavl	108	(1)
- * Club domestic league appearances and goals as of 09:19, 29 August 2014 (UTC)

Maksym Andriyovych Biletskyi (Ukrainian: Максим Андрійович Білецький; born 7 January 1980) is a retired Ukrainian football midfielder.
