= Stanislav Ivanov (footballer, born 1980) =

Moldovan footballer

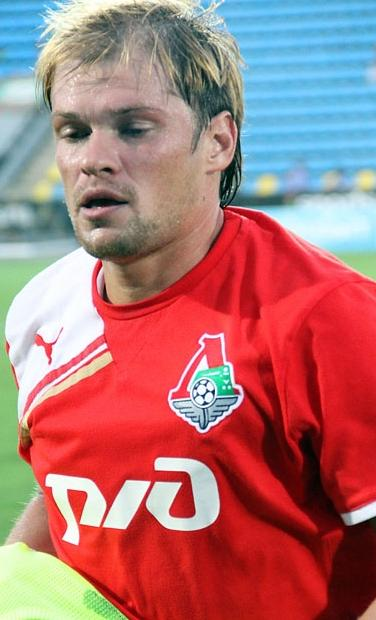
- Ivanov with Lokomotiv Moscow in 2011

Personal information
- Date of birth: 7 October 1980 (age 46)
- Place of birth: Tiraspol, Moldavian SSR, Soviet Union
- Height: 1.83 m (6 ft 0 in)
- Position: Midfielder

Senior career*
Years	Team	Apps	(Gls)
1997–2004	Sheriff Tiraspol	141	(16)
2004–2008	Moscow	112	(9)
2009–2012	Lokomotiv Moscow	16	(0)
2009	→ Krylia Sovetov Samara (loan)	10	(0)
2010	→ Rostov (loan)	9	(0)
2012–2013	Sheriff Tiraspol	10	(1)
2013	Tiraspol	1	(0)

International career
2001–2012	Moldova	43	(0)
- * Club domestic league appearances and goals

Stanislav Ivanov (born 7 October 1980) is a former Moldovan footballer.

== Career ==
Ivanov began his career by Sheriff Tiraspol, before 2004 transferred to Moscow. On 21 January 2009 he moved to Lokomotiv Moscow, who have loaned out the Moldovan midfielder to Krylya Sovetov on 30 June 2009.

== International ==
He played 9 games in 2006 FIFA World Cup qualification (UEFA) and 6 games in UEFA Euro 2008 qualifying.
