= Yuri Baskakov =

Russian football referee

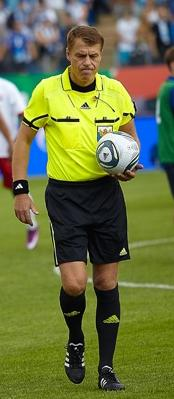
Baskakov in 2011

Yuri Valeryevich Baskakov (Russian: Юрий Валерьевич Баскаков; born May 10, 1964, in Moscow) is a former Russian football referee. He refereed games in Champions League and the Russian Premier League.

He oversaw the first leg of the Champions League quarter-final in 2007 between Bayern Munich and AC Milan.
