= Dmitri Godunok =

Russian footballer and coach

Dmitri Godunok Дмитрий Годунок
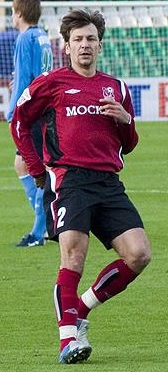
- Godunok in 2008

Personal information
- Full name: Dmitri Vladimirovich Godunok
- Date of birth: 4 January 1976 (age 50)
- Place of birth: Volzhsky, Volgograd Oblast, Soviet Union
- Height: 1.81 m (5 ft 11 in)
- Position: Defender

Youth career
- DYuSSh Volzhsky
- Sportsinternat Volgograd

Senior career*
Years	Team	Apps	(Gls)
1993–1996	FC Torpedo Volzhsky	68	(4)
1997	FC Energiya Kamyshin	24	(2)
1998–2002	FC Lada Togliatti	155	(25)
2003–2004	FC Tom Tomsk	73	(7)
2005–2008	FC Moscow	100	(3)
2009	FC Alania Vladikavkaz	33	(2)
2010–2012	FC Akademiya Togliatti	57	(4)
2018	FC Akron Tolyatti (amateur)		

Managerial career
- 2013–2014: Konoplyov football academy
- 2015: FC Akademiya-Lada-M (assistant)
- 2016: FC Lada Togliatti (assistant)
- 2016–2017: FC Sochi (assistant)
- 2019–2021: FC Akron Tolyatti (assistant)
- * Club domestic league appearances and goals

Dmitri Vladimirovich Godunok (Russian: Дмитрий Владимирович Годунок; born 4 January 1976) is a Russian football coach and a former player.
