= Andrei Lukanchenkov =

Russian footballer

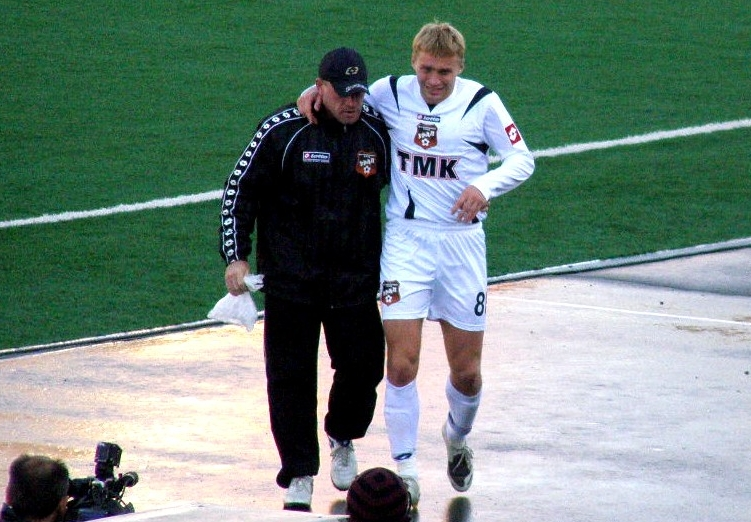

Personal information
- Full name: Andrei Semyonovich Lukanchenkov
- Date of birth: 7 February 1986 (age 40)
- Place of birth: Velikiye Luki, Russia, Soviet Union
- Height: 1.82 m (6 ft 0 in)
- Position: Defender

Senior career*
Years	Team	Apps	(Gls)
2001	FC Krivichi Velikiye Luki	11	(0)
2002–2003	FC Pskov-2000	5	(0)
2003–2009	FC Moscow	1	(0)
2006	→ FC Sodovik Sterlitamak (loan)	3	(0)
2007	→ FC SKA Rostov-on-Don (loan)	34	(5)
2008	→ FC Ural Yekaterinburg (loan)	15	(0)
2009	→ FC Nosta Novotroitsk (loan)	24	(1)
2010	FC Avangard Kursk	23	(0)
2011–2012	PFC Spartak Nalchik	4	(0)
2012	FC Zenit Penza	4	(1)
2013–2014	FC Tosno	22	(1)
2014–2015	FC Saturn Ramenskoye	29	(1)
2015–2017	FC Dynamo Saint Petersburg	45	(0)
2017–2020	FC Dynamo Bryansk	55	(3)
2021–2023	FC Luki-Energiya Velikiye Luki	38	(3)

International career
2005–2007	Russia U-21	8	(0)
- * Club domestic league appearances and goals

Andrei Semyonovich Lukanchenkov (Russian: Андрей Семёнович Луканченков; born 7 February 1986) is a Russian former professional footballer.

== Club career ==
He made his debut in the Russian Premier League in 2006 for FC Moscow.

== Honours ==
- Russian Cup finalist: 2007.
