= Damian Gorawski =

Polish footballer

Personal information
- Date of birth: 4 January 1979 (age 47)
- Place of birth: Ruda Śląska, Poland
- Height: 1.79 m (5 ft 10 in)
- Position: Winger

Senior career*
Years	Team	Apps	(Gls)
1997–2003	Ruch Chorzów	97	(17)
2003–2004	Wisła Kraków	31	(6)
2005–2007	FC Moscow	39	(2)
2008	Shinnik Yaroslavl	18	(1)
2009	Górnik Zabrze	18	(2)
2010–2011	Górnik Zabrze II		
2020–2021	Orlęta Rudawa	5	(1)
2022–2023	Tęcza Tenczynek	13	(2)

International career
2003–2005	Poland	14	(1)
- * Club domestic league appearances and goals

Damian Gorawski (born 4 January 1979) is a Polish former professional footballer who played as a winger.

== Club career ==
Gorawski was born in Ruda Śląska. He played for Ruch Chorzów, Wisła Kraków and FC Moscow. Though the fee transferring him to the Russian side was never made public, it was assumed to be around $1.9 million.

== International career ==
Gorawski has appeared for Poland 14 times, scoring once.

He was named for the 23-men Polish squad for the 2006 FIFA World Cup finals held in Germany, but was subsequently replaced by Bartosz Bosacki having failed medical tests after being diagnosed with severe asthma.

== Career statistics ==
=== International ===
Appearances and goals by national team and year
National team	Year	Apps	Goals
Poland
Poland	2003	2	0
Poland	2004	9	1
Poland	2005	3	0
Total		14	1

Scores and results list Poland's goal tally first, score column indicates score after each Gorawski goal.

List of international goals scored by Damian Gorawski
No.	Date	Venue	Opponent	Score	Result	Competition
1	5 June 2004	Råsunda Stadium, Solna, Sweden	Sweden	1–3	1–3	Friendly

== Honours ==
Wisła Kraków

- Ekstraklasa: 2003–04, 2004–05
