= Dmitry Golubov =

Russian footballer

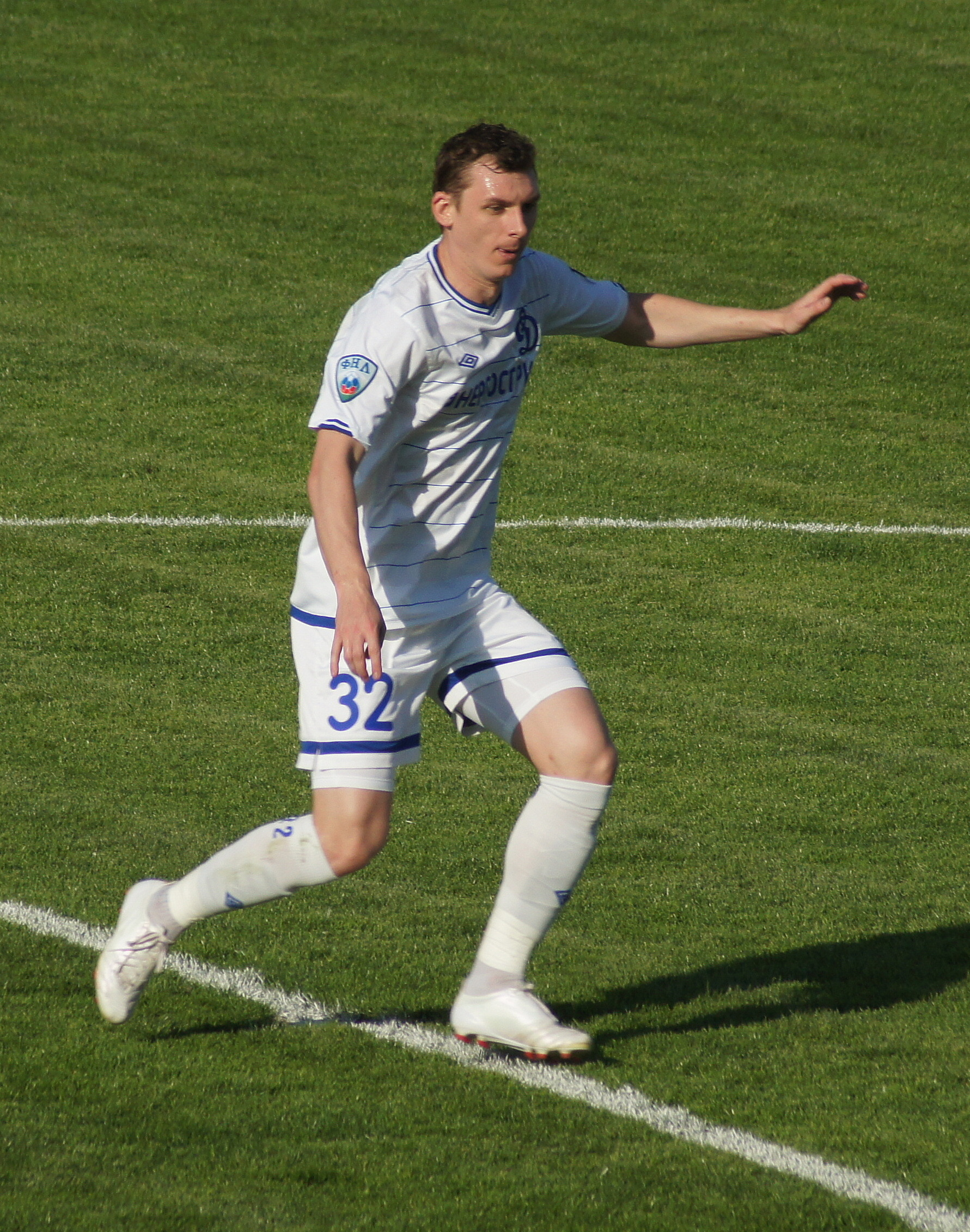
- Dmitry Golubov in 2012

Personal information
- Full name: Dmitry Sergeyevich Golubov
- Date of birth: 24 June 1985 (age 41)
- Place of birth: Stavropol, Russian SFSR
- Height: 1.78 m (5 ft 10 in)
- Position: Forward

Senior career*
Years	Team	Apps	(Gls)
2003	FC Uralan Elista	0	(0)
2004	FC Tekstilshchik Kamyshin	30	(6)
2005–2007	FC Moscow	20	(3)
2006	→ FC Torpedo Moscow (loan)	11	(1)
2008	FC Volga Ulyanovsk	37	(15)
2009–2011	FC Baltika Kaliningrad	93	(28)
2011–2012	FC Dynamo Bryansk	24	(17)
2012	FC Alania Vladikavkaz	4	(0)
2013–2015	FC Ufa	49	(17)
2015	→ FC Tom Tomsk (loan)	15	(0)
2016	FC Dynamo Stavropol	7	(1)
2016	Aktobe	2	(1)

International career
2004	Russia U-19	7	(2)
2006	Russia U-21	1	(0)
- * Club domestic league appearances and goals

Dmitry Sergeyevich Golubov (Russian: Дмитрий Сергеевич Голубов, born 14 June 1985) is a Russian former professional footballer.

== Career ==
Golubov made his debut in the Russian Premier League in 2005 for FC Moscow.

Golubov signed for FC Aktobe in June 2016, leaving the club a couple of months later.
