= Aleksei Melyoshin =

Russian footballer and coach

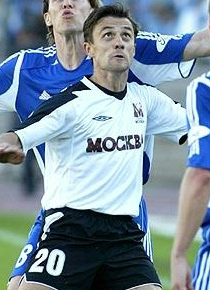

Personal information
- Full name: Aleksei Vladislavovich Melyoshin
- Date of birth: 30 January 1976 (age 50)
- Place of birth: Shchyolkovo, Russian SFSR
- Height: 1.76 m (5 ft 9 1/2 in)
- Positions: Midfielder; forward

Team information
- Current team: FC Chelyabinsk (manager)

Youth career
- FC Spartak Moscow

Senior career*
Years	Team	Apps	(Gls)
1995–1997	FC Spartak-d Moscow	44	(6)
1996–1999	FC Spartak Moscow	68	(5)
1998–2000	FC Spartak-2 Moscow	29	(1)
2000–2002	FC Saturn Ramenskoye	73	(6)
2003	FC Dynamo Saint Petersburg	40	(5)
2004–2008	FC Moscow	78	(9)
2009–2010	FC Torpedo-ZIL Moscow	48	(8)

Managerial career
- 2011–2013: FC Spartak Moscow (academy)
- 2013–2014: FC Spartak Moscow (U19 assistant)
- 2014: FC Spartak Moscow (U19)
- 2014–2017: FC Spartak Moscow (academy)
- 2017–2022: FC Spartak Moscow (U19 assistant)
- 2022–2023: FC Spartak Moscow (academy)
- 2023–2024: FC Spartak Moscow (U16)
- 2025: FC Spartak Moscow (academy)
- 2025: FC Spartak-2 Moscow
- 2026: FC Spartak Moscow (U19)
- 2026–: FC Chelyabinsk
- * Club domestic league appearances and goals

Aleksei Vladislavovich Melyoshin (Russian: Алексей Владиславович Мелёшин; born 30 January 1976) is a Russian football coach and a former player. He is the manager of Russian First League club FC Chelyabinsk.

== Personal life ==
His son Pavel Melyoshin is a professional footballer.

== Achievements ==
- Russian Premier League winner: 1996, 1997, 1998, 1999.
- Russian Second Division, Zone West best midfielder: 2009.
