= Pyotr Marshinskiy =

Russian footballer

Personal information
- Full name: Pyotr Aleksandrovich Marshinskiy
- Date of birth: 17 February 1986 (age 40)
- Height: 1.78 m (5 ft 10 in)
- Position: Defender

Youth career
- FC Torpedo-Metallurg Moscow

Senior career*
Years	Team	Apps	(Gls)
2003–2007	FC Moscow	0	(0)
2007	FK Daugava Daugavpils	6	(0)
2008	FC Nika Moscow	24	(0)
2009	FC Spartak Shchyolkovo	18	(0)
2010	FC Torpedo Lyuberetsky Rayon		
2010–2011	FC Oka Stupino (amateur)		
2012–2013	FC Troitsk Moscow		
2013–2015	FC Istra (amateur)		
2016	FC Letniy Dozhdik Moscow		
- * Club domestic league appearances and goals

Pyotr Aleksandrovich Marshinskiy (Russian: Пётр Александрович Маршинский; born 17 February 1986) is a former Russian professional footballer.

== Club career ==
He made his debut for FC Moscow on 11 August 2005 in a Russian Cup game against FC Dynamo Makhachkala. He made his next appearance on 2 July 2006 in the next season's Russian Cup game against FC Terek Grozny, FC Moscow eventually reached the final.

== Personal life ==
His brother Aleksei Marshinskiy is also a professional footballer.

== Honours ==
- Russian Cup finalist: 2007.
