= Aleksandr Ponomaryov (footballer, born 1986) =

Russian footballer

Personal information
- Full name: Aleksandr Vladimirovich Ponomaryov
- Date of birth: 25 January 1986 (age 40)
- Place of birth: Novo-Dolgovskiy, Volgograd Oblast, Russian SFSR
- Height: 1.88 m (6 ft 2 in)
- Position: Defender

Senior career*
Years	Team	Apps	(Gls)
2002–2003	FC Spartak Moscow	0	(0)
2004	FC Dynamo Moscow	0	(0)
2005–2007	FC Moscow	0	(0)
2008	FC Rostov	11	(0)
2008	FC Torpedo Moscow	17	(0)
2009	FC Rostov	1	(0)
2009–2010	FC Vityaz Podolsk	11	(1)
2010	Chornomorets Odesa	5	(0)
- * Club domestic league appearances and goals

Aleksandr Vladimirovich Ponomaryov (Russian: Александр Владимирович Пономарёв; born 25 January 1986) is a former Russian professional footballer.

== Club career ==
He made his debut in the Russian Premier League for FC Rostov in a game against FC Dynamo Moscow on 11 April 2009.
