= Andrei Moiseyenkov =

Russian footballer

Personal information
- Full name: Andrei Viktorovich Moiseyenkov
- Date of birth: 5 January 1987 (age 39)
- Height: 1.74 m (5 ft 9 in)
- Positions: Defender; midfielder

Team information
- Current team: FC Olimp-SKOPA Balashikha

Youth career
- FC Moscow

Senior career*
Years	Team	Apps	(Gls)
2004–2007	FC Moscow	0	(0)
2009–2010	FC Torpedo-ZIL Moscow	38	(0)
2010–2011	FC Kaluga	34	(2)
2012	FC Podolye Podolsky district	5	(0)
2012	FC Lyubertsy		
2013	FC StArs Kolomensky District		
2014	FC Olimp-SKOPA Zheleznodorozhny		
2015	FC Lyubertsy		
2016–2017	FC Olimp-SKOPA Balashikha		
2018–2019	FC Vityaz Podolsk (amateur)		
- * Club domestic league appearances and goals

Andrei Viktorovich Moiseyenkov (Russian: Андрей Викторович Моисеенков; born 5 January 1987) is a Russian former professional football player.

== Honours ==
- Russian Cup finalist: 2007 (played for the main squad of FC Moscow in the competition).
