= 2004 FC Moscow season =

Moscow
2004 season
- Manager: Valery Petrakov
- Stadium: Eduard Streltsov Stadium
- Premier League: 9th
- Russian Cup: Progressed to 2005 season
- Top goalscorer: League: Héctor Bracamonte (10); All: Héctor Bracamonte (10)

The 2004 FC Moscow season was the club's 1st season in existence after taking over the licence of Torpedo-Metallurg. They finished the season in 9th place, and reached the Round of 32 in the Russian Cup, with the Round of 16 taking place in the 2005 season.

== Squad ==
As of match played 11 November 2004

No.	Name	Nationality	Position	Date of birth (age)	Signed from	Signed in	Contract ends	Apps.	Goals
Goalkeepers
1	Aleksandr Filimonov	(Russia)	GK	15 October 1973 (aged 31)	Uralan Elista	2004		27	0
12	Vitali Astakhov	(Russia)	GK	9 January 1979 (aged 25)	Torpedo-Metallurg	2004		5	0
16	Rinat Yesipenko	(Ukraine)	GK	22 October 1983 (aged 21)	Shakhtar Donetsk	2004		0	0
17	Andris Vaņins	(Latvia)	GK	30 April 1980 (aged 24)	Ventspils	2004		0	0
Defenders
3	Rolandas Džiaukštas	(Lithuania)	DF	1 April 1978 (aged 26)	Torpedo-Metallurg	2004		21	0
4	Munever Rizvić	(Bosnia and Herzegovina)	DF	4 November 1973 (aged 31)	Torpedo-Metallurg	2004		10	1
8	Pompiliu Stoica	(Romania)	DF	10 September 1976 (aged 28)	Steaua București	2004		11	0
14	Syarhey Yaskovich	(Belarus)	DF	14 January 1972 (aged 32)	Tom Tomsk	2004		16	0
18	Kirill Orlov	(Russia)	DF	18 January 1983 (aged 21)	Torpedo-Metallurg	2004		24	0
22	Oleg Kuzmin	(Russia)	DF	9 May 1981 (aged 23)	Uralan Elista	2004		8	1
25	Mariusz Jop	(Poland)	DF	3 August 1978 (aged 26)	Wisła Kraków	2004		16	3
41	Kirill Nababkin	(Russia)	DF	8 September 1986 (aged 18)	Youth Team	2004		0	0
50	Andrei Lukanchenkov	(Russia)	DF	7 February 1986 (aged 18)	Torpedo-Metallurg	2004		0	0
99	Jerry-Christian Tchuissé	(Cameroon)	DF	13 January 1975 (aged 29)	Chernomorets Novorossiysk	2004		25	2
Midfielders
5	Radu Rebeja	(Moldova)	MF	8 June 1973 (aged 31)	Saturn Ramenskoye	2004		29	1
6	Sergey Shustikov	(Russia)	MF	30 September 1970 (aged 34)	Torpedo-Metallurg	2004		16	0
13	Maksym Biletskyi	(Ukraine)	MF	7 January 1980 (aged 24)	Torpedo-Metallurg	2004		22	2
15	Valeri Leonov	(Russia)	MF	17 September 1980 (aged 24)	Torpedo-Metallurg	2004		13	0
20	Aleksei Melyoshin	(Russia)	MF	30 January 1976 (aged 28)	Dynamo St.Petersburg	2004		28	4
24	Ruslan Baltiev	(Kazakhstan)	MF	16 September 1978 (aged 26)	Dynamo Moscow	2004		28	2
33	Aleksandr Ryazantsev	(Russia)	MF	5 September 1986 (aged 18)	Youth Team	2004		2	0
34	Vyacheslav Danilin	(Russia)	MF	14 March 1984 (aged 20)	Torpedo-Metallurg	2004		1	0
36	Ivan Bakulin	(Russia)	MF	16 April 1986 (aged 18)	Torpedo-Metallurg	2004		1	0
44	Sergei Korobov	(Russia)	MF	18 January 1986 (aged 18)	Youth Team	2004		0	0
77	Stanislav Ivanov	(Moldova)	MF	7 October 1980 (aged 24)	Sheriff Tiraspol	2004		15	2
Forwards
7	Andrey Movsisyan	(Armenia)	FW	27 October 1975 (aged 29)	Torpedo-Metallurg	2004		6	1
10	Cristian Tudor	(Romania)	FW	23 August 1982 (aged 22)	Sheriff Tiraspol	2004		5	0
11	Budun Budunov	(Russia)	FW	4 December 1975 (aged 28)	Anzhi Makhachkala	2004		19	7
19	Héctor Bracamonte	(Argentina)	FW	16 February 1978 (aged 26)	Torpedo-ZIL Moscow	2004		30	10
23	Andrei Nikolayev	(Russia)	FW	30 August 1982 (aged 22)	Zenit St.Petersburg	2004		12	2
26	Stanton Fredericks	(South Africa)	FW	13 June 1977 (aged 27)	Kaizer Chiefs	2004		3	1
27	Dmitri Kudinov	(Russia)	FW	25 August 1985 (aged 19)	Shinnik Yaroslavl	2004		0	0
28	Baba Adamu	(Ghana)	FW	20 September 1979 (aged 25)	Al-Nasr	2004		15	5
30	Vladimirs Koļesņičenko	(Latvia)	FW	4 May 1980 (aged 24)	Skonto Riga	2004		2	0
31	German Lovchev	(Russia)	FW	10 July 1981 (aged 23)	Uralan Elista	2004		0	0
35	Aleksandr Borodkin	(Russia)	FW	12 October 1984 (aged 20)	Youth Team	2004		0	0
37	Denis Zabotin	(Russia)	FW	23 January 1985 (aged 19)	Youth Team	2004		0	0
38	Andrei Kordun	(Russia)	FW	7 December 1985 (aged 18)	Youth Team	2004		1	0
43	Aleksandr Sukhov	(Russia)	FW	3 January 1986 (aged 18)	Youth Team	2004		0	0
49	Viktor Zemchenkov	(Russia)	FW	15 September 1986 (aged 18)	Youth Team	2004		0	0
Away on loan
40	Sergei Sharin	(Russia)	MF	5 August 1984 (aged 20)	Torpedo-Metallurg	2004		0	0
Players that left Moscow during the season
2	Andrey Astrowski	(Belarus)	DF	13 September 1973 (aged 31)	Arsenal Kyiv	2004		12	0
8	Narvik Sırxayev	(Azerbaijan)	MF	16 March 1974 (aged 30)	Lokomotiv Moscow	2004		15	2
21	Amir Karić	(Slovenia)	DF	31 December 1973 (aged 30)	Maribor	2004		6	0
29	Gustavo Pinto	(Argentina)	MF	29 May 1979 (aged 25)	Torpedo-Metallurg	2004		1	0
66	Aleksandar Komadina	(Serbia and Montenegro)	MF	5 August 1984 (aged 20)	Torpedo-Metallurg	2004		0	0
98	Levani Bereshvili	(Georgia (country))	MF	1 June 1975 (aged 29)	ILTEX Lykoi	2004		0	0

=== On loan ===
Note: Flags indicate national team as defined under FIFA eligibility rules; some limited exceptions apply. Players may hold more than one non-FIFA nationality.

No.	Pos.	Nation	Player
40	MF	RUS	Sergei Sharin (at Metallurg Krasnoyarsk)

=== Left club during season ===
Note: Flags indicate national team as defined under FIFA eligibility rules; some limited exceptions apply. Players may hold more than one non-FIFA nationality.

No.	Pos.	Nation	Player
2	DF	BLR	Andrey Astrowski (to Arsenal Kyiv)
8	MF	AZE	Narvik Sırxayev (to Terek Grozny)
21	DF	SLO	Amir Karić (to Mura)

No.	Pos.	Nation	Player
29	MF	ARG	Gustavo Pinto
66	MF	SCG	Aleksandar Komadina (to Khimki)
90	MF	GEO	Levani Bereshvili (to Metallurg-Kuzbass)

== Transfers ==
=== In ===
Date	Position	Nationality	Name	From	Fee	Ref.
Winter 2004	GK	(Latvia)	Andris Vaņins	Ventspils	Undisclosed	
Winter 2004	GK	(Russia)	Vitali Astakhov	Torpedo-Metallurg	Free	
Winter 2004	GK	(Russia)	Aleksandr Filimonov	Uralan Elista	Undisclosed	
Winter 2004	GK	(Ukraine)	Rinat Yesipenko	Shakhtar Donetsk	Undisclosed	
Winter 2004	DF	(Armenia)	Sargis Hovsepyan	Torpedo-Metallurg	Free	
Winter 2004	DF	(Belarus)	Andrey Astrowski	Arsenal Kyiv	Undisclosed	
Winter 2004	DF	(Belarus)	Syarhey Yaskovich	Tom Tomsk	Undisclosed	
Winter 2004	DF	(Bosnia and Herzegovina)	Munever Rizvić	Torpedo-Metallurg	Free	
Winter 2004	DF	(Cameroon)	Jerry-Christian Tchuissé	Chernomorets Novorossiysk	Undisclosed	
Winter 2004	DF	(Lithuania)	Rolandas Džiaukštas	Torpedo-Metallurg	Free	
Winter 2004	DF	(Russia)	Oleg Kuzmin	Uralan Elista	Undisclosed	
Winter 2004	DF	(Russia)	Kirill Orlov	Torpedo-Metallurg	Free	
Winter 2004	DF	(Slovenia)	Amir Karić	Maribor	Undisclosed	
Winter 2004	MF	(Azerbaijan)	Narvik Sırxayev	Lokomotiv Moscow	Undisclosed	
Winter 2004	MF	(Argentina)	Gustavo Pinto	Torpedo-Metallurg	Free	
Winter 2004	MF	(Georgia (country))	Levani Bereshvili	ILTEX Lykoi	Undisclosed	
Winter 2004	MF	(Kazakhstan)	Ruslan Baltiev	Dynamo Moscow	Undisclosed	
Winter 2004	MF	(Romania)	Radu Rebeja	Saturn Ramenskoye	Undisclosed	
Winter 2004	MF	(Russia)	Ivan Bakulin	Torpedo-Metallurg	Free	
Winter 2004	MF	(Russia)	Vyacheslav Danilin	Torpedo-Metallurg	Free	
Winter 2004	MF	(Russia)	Valeri Leonov	Torpedo-Metallurg	Free	
Winter 2004	MF	(Russia)	Andrei Lukanchenkov	Torpedo-Metallurg	Free	
Winter 2004	MF	(Russia)	Aleksei Melyoshin	Dynamo St.Petersburg	Undisclosed	
Winter 2004	MF	(Russia)	Sergei Sharin	Torpedo-Metallurg	Free	
Winter 2004	MF	(Russia)	Sergey Shustikov	Torpedo-Metallurg	Free	
Winter 2004	MF	(Serbia and Montenegro)	Aleksandar Komadina	Torpedo-Metallurg	Free	
Winter 2004	MF	(Ukraine)	Maksym Biletskyi	Torpedo-Metallurg	Free	
Winter 2004	FW	(Argentina)	Héctor Bracamonte	Boca Juniors	Undisclosed	
Winter 2004	FW	(Armenia)	Andrey Movsisyan	Torpedo-Metallurg	Free	
Winter 2004	FW	(Latvia)	Vladimirs Koļesņičenko	Skonto Riga	Undisclosed	
Winter 2004	FW	(Russia)	Budun Budunov	Anzhi Makhachkala	Undisclosed	
Winter 2004	FW	(Russia)	Dmitri Kudinov	Shinnik Yaroslavl	Undisclosed	
Winter 2004	FW	(Russia)	German Lovchev	Uralan Elista	Undisclosed	
Winter 2004	FW	(Russia)	Andrei Nikolayev	Zenit St.Petersburg	Undisclosed	
Summer 2004	DF	(Poland)	Mariusz Jop	Wisła Kraków	Undisclosed	
Summer 2004	DF	(Romania)	Pompiliu Stoica	Steaua București	Undisclosed	
Summer 2004	MF	(Moldova)	Stanislav Ivanov	Sheriff Tiraspol	Undisclosed	
Summer 2004	FW	(Ghana)	Baba Adamu	Al-Nasr	Undisclosed	
Summer 2004	FW	(Romania)	Cristian Tudor	Sheriff Tiraspol	Undisclosed	
Summer 2004	FW	(South Africa)	Stanton Fredericks	Kaizer Chiefs	Undisclosed	

=== Out ===
Date	Position	Nationality	Name	To	Fee	Ref.
Summer 2004	DF	(Belarus)	Andrey Astrowski	Arsenal Kyiv	Undisclosed	
Summer 2004	DF	(Slovenia)	Amir Karić	Mura	Undisclosed	
Summer 2004	MF	(Azerbaijan)	Narvik Sırxayev	Terek Grozny	Undisclosed	
Summer 2004	MF	(Georgia (country))	Levani Bereshvili	Metallurg-Kuzbass	Undisclosed	
Summer 2004	MF	(Serbia and Montenegro)	Aleksandar Komadina	Khimki	Undisclosed	

=== Loans out ===
Date from	Position	Nationality	Name	To	Date to	Ref.
Winter 2004	MF	(Russia)	Sergei Sharin	Metallurg Krasnoyarsk	End of Season	

=== Released ===
Date	Position	Nationality	Name	Joined	Date
Summer 2004	MF	(Argentina)	Gustavo Pinto	Emelec	
31 December 2004	GK	(Latvia)	Andris Vaņins	Venta	
31 December 2004	GK	(Russia)	Vitali Astakhov	Fakel Voronezh	
31 December 2004	DF	(Belarus)	Syarhey Yaskovich	Tom Tomsk	
31 December 2004	DF	(Bosnia and Herzegovina)	Munever Rizvić	Budućnost Banovići	
31 December 2004	DF	(Russia)	Dmitri Kudinov	Torpedo Moscow	
31 December 2004	MF	(Russia)	Sergey Shustikov	Retired	
31 December 2004	FW	(Latvia)	Vladimirs Koļesņičenko	Venta Kuldiga	
31 December 2004	FW	(Russia)	German Lovchev	Luki-Energiya Velikiye Luki	

== Competitions ==
=== Premier League ===
==== Results by round ====
Round	1	2	3	4	5	6	7	8	9	10	11	12	13	14	15	16	17	18	19	20	21	22	23	24	25	26	27	28
Ground	D	D	L	W	W	D	L	D	D	W	L	L	L	W	L	W	D	W	D	W	D	D	W	L	L	L	W	L
Result	A	H	A	H	A	H	A	H	A	H	A	H	A	H	A	H	A	H	A	H	A	H	A	H	A	H	A	H

Updated to match(es) played on 11 November 2004. Source: See Results
A = Away; H = Home; W = Win; D = Draw; L = Loss

==== Results ====
12 March 2004 1	CSKA Moscow	0–0	FC Moscow	Moscow
19:00 MSK (UTC+3)		Report	Yaskovich (yellow card) 90'	Stadium: Dynamo Stadium; Attendance: 10,000; Referee: Aleksandr Kolobaev

21 March 2004 2	FC Moscow	1–1	Zenit St.Petersburg	Moscow
16:00 MSK (UTC+3)	Yaskovich (yellow card) 11'; Tchuissé (yellow card) 43'; Shustikov (yellow card) 57'; Budunov 68' (yellow card) 71'	Report	Kerzhakov 25'	Stadium: Eduard Streltsov Stadium; Attendance: 4,000; Referee: Alexey Tyumin

28 March 2004 3	Spartak Moscow	3–2	FC Moscow	Moscow
15:00 MSK (UTC+3)	Parfenov 18' (pen.), 32' (pen.); Șoavă (yellow card) 58'; Pjanović (yellow card) 78'; Samedov 89'	Report	Bracamonte 1' (yellow card) 39'; Budunov (yellow card) 19' (goal) 83'	Stadium: Luzhniki Stadium; Attendance: 10,000; Referee: Igor Zakharov

3 April 2004 4	FC Moscow	5–1	Krylia Sovetov	Moscow
17:00 MSK (UTC+3)	Bracamonte (yellow card) 8' (goal) 67'; Melyoshin 20'; Sırxayev 45+'; Nikolayev 80', 88'	Report	Kowba (yellow card) 66'; Bobyor 83'	Stadium: Eduard Streltsov Stadium; Attendance: 4,000; Referee: Nikolai Ivanov

7 April 2004 5	Lokomotiv Moscow	0–1	FC Moscow	Moscow
19:00 MSK (UTC+3)	Nizhegorodov (yellow card) 72'	Report	Bracamonte 22'; Baltiev (yellow card) 88'	Stadium: RZD Arena; Attendance: 5,500; Referee: Sergei Frantsuzov

10 April 2004 6	FC Moscow	2–2	Rostov	Moscow
17:00 MSK (UTC+3)	Sırxayev 14'; Orlov (yellow card) 26'; Tchuissé (yellow card) 39' (goal) 78'	Report	Gutiérrez (yellow card) 8'; Villaseca 31'; Shirshov (yellow card) 38'; Datsenko (yellow card) 52'; Booth (yellow card) 65'; Pérez 90'	Stadium: Eduard Streltsov Stadium; Attendance: 3,000; Referee: Sergey Lapochkin

18 April 2004 7	Alania Vladikavkaz	1–0	FC Moscow	Vladikavkaz
16:00 MSK (UTC+3)	Drozdov (yellow card) 26'; Tudor 38'; Yanovsky (yellow card) 67'	Report	Sırxayev (yellow card) 44'; Bracamonte (yellow card) 51'; Yaskovich (yellow card) 75'; Pinto (yellow card) 90'	Stadium: Republican Spartak Stadium; Attendance: 24,000; Referee: Alexander Gonchar

24 April 2004 8	FC Moscow	2–2	Kuban Krasnodar	Moscow
19:00 MSK (UTC+3)	Rizvić (yellow card) 28' (goal) 66'; Bracamonte 40'	Report	Kantonistov 4' (pen.); Dykan (yellow card) 17'; Matiola (yellow card) 48' (yellow-red card) 72'; Dyomin (yellow card) 51'; Orekhov (yellow card) 89'; Landyrev 90+'	Stadium: Eduard Streltsov Stadium; Attendance: 2,500; Referee: Aleksandr Gvardis

2 May 2004 9	Saturn Ramenskoye	1–1	FC Moscow	Ramenskoye
18:00 MSK (UTC+3)	Bystrov 49' (yellow card) 81'; Sviderskyi (yellow card) 77'	Report	Melyoshin (yellow card) 35' (goal) 63'; Rizvić (yellow card) 44'	Stadium: Saturn Stadium; Attendance: 9,500; Referee: Vladimir Vlasov

8 May 2004 10	FC Moscow	1–0	Rotor Volgograd	Moscow
18:00 MSK (UTC+3)	Bracamonte (yellow card) 35' (goal) 50'; Shustikov (yellow card) 88'	Report		Stadium: Eduard Streltsov Stadium; Attendance: 2,000; Referee: Yuri Kunitsa

16 May 2004 11	Dynamo Moscow	1–0	FC Moscow	Moscow
18:00 MSK (UTC+3)	Polovinchuk (yellow card) 27'; Yashin 57'	Report	Karić (yellow card) 38'; Džiaukštas (yellow card) 40'; Astrowski (yellow card) 41'	Stadium: Dynamo Stadium; Attendance: 5,000; Referee: Mikhail Khodyrev

19 May 2004 12	FC Moscow	0–2	Torpedo Moscow	Moscow
19:00 MSK (UTC+3)	Yaskovich (yellow card) 34'	Report	Samusiovas 14'; Panov 27'; Semshov (yellow card) 41'	Stadium: Eduard Streltsov Stadium; Attendance: 2,300; Referee: Yuri Baskakov

23 May 2004 13	Rubin Kazan	3–0	FC Moscow	Kazan
18:00 MSK (UTC+3)	Dostálek 52'; Baýramow 81', 83'	Report	Biletskyi (yellow card) 40'; Orlov (yellow card) 71'	Stadium: Central Stadium; Attendance: 10,000; Referee: Stanislav Sukhina

3 July 2004 14	FC Moscow	3–2	Shinnik Yaroslavl	Moscow
MSK (UTC+3)	Bracamonte 42'; Džiaukštas (yellow card) 49'; Budunov 58' (pen.); Biletskyi (yellow card) 65'; Jop 75'; Tchuissé (yellow card) 90+'	Report	Rubins 4'; Shirko (yellow card) 13'; Fuzailov 65'	Stadium: Eduard Streltsov Stadium; Attendance: 1,000; Referee: Vladimir Pettay

7 July 2004 15	Amkar Perm	1–0	FC Moscow	Perm
17:00 MSK (UTC+3)	Lavrik (yellow card) 43'; Bulyga (yellow card) 43'; Shutov (yellow card) 90+'	Report	Ivanov (yellow card) 30'; Rebeja (yellow card) 46'	Stadium: Zvezda Stadium; Attendance: 13,200; Referee: Sergey Fursa

11 July 2004 16	FC Moscow	1–0	Rubin Kazan	Moscow
19:00 MSK (UTC+3)	Yaskovich (yellow card) 38' (yellow-red card) 90+'; Melyoshin (yellow card) 45'; Budunov 73'	Report	Domínguez (yellow card) 24'; Dostálek (yellow card) 41'; Sharonov (yellow card) 76'	Stadium: Eduard Streltsov Stadium; Attendance: 1,500; Referee: Yuri Klyuchnikov

17 July 2004 17	Shinnik Yaroslavl	1–1	FC Moscow	Yaroslavl
MSK (UTC+3)	Łągiewka (yellow card) 23'; Shirko 39'; Starostyak (yellow card) 41'	Report	Yaskovich (yellow card) 39'; Ivanov 69' (yellow card) 84'	Stadium: Shinnik Stadium; Attendance: 7,600; Referee: Stanislav Sukhina

25 July 2004 18	FC Moscow	3–1	Amkar Perm	Moscow
19:00 MSK (UTC+3)	Budunov 18' (yellow card) 75'; Rebeja (yellow card) 22'; Baltiev 44'; Bracamonte 46'; Melyoshin (yellow card) 59'; Ivanov (yellow card) 68'; Džiaukštas (yellow card) 89'; Fredericks (yellow card) 90'	Report	Povorov (yellow card) 17'; Bakhtin 26'; Olexici (yellow card) 38'; Sirakov (yellow card) 54'	Stadium: Eduard Streltsov Stadium; Attendance: 1,500; Referee: Alexander Evstigneev

15 August 2004 19	Torpedo Moscow	1–1	FC Moscow	Moscow
18:00 MSK (UTC+3)	Samusiovas (yellow card) 31'; Lebedenko 38'; Zyryanov (yellow card) 59'; Bugayev (yellow card) 87'	Report	Baltiev (yellow card) 7'; Orlov (yellow card) 20'; Bracamonte 86'	Stadium: Luzhniki Stadium; Attendance: 3,000; Referee: Yuri Baskakov

21 August 2004 20	FC Moscow	2–1	Saturn Ramenskoye	Moscow
19:00 MSK (UTC+3)	Jop (yellow card) 23' (goal) 32'; Rebeja 37'; Tchuissé (yellow card) 62'; Baltiev (yellow card) 70'; Ivanov (yellow card) 77'	Report	Géder (yellow card) 19'; Guiñazú (yellow card) 22'; Delgado 27'; Montenegro (yellow card) 40'; Jean (yellow card) 40'	Stadium: Eduard Streltsov Stadium; Attendance: 2,500; Referee: Nikolai Ivanov

29 August 2004 21	Rotor Volgograd	1–1	FC Moscow	Volgograd
18:00 MSK (UTC+3)	Krivov (yellow card) 52'; Gogniyev 62'	Report	Džiaukštas (yellow card) 11'; Biletskyi (yellow card) 48'; Bracamonte 64'; Tchuissé (yellow card) 81'	Stadium: Central Stadium; Attendance: 2,000; Referee: Yuri Kunitsa

12 September 2004 22	FC Moscow	1–0	Dynamo Moscow	Moscow
17:00 MSK (UTC+3)	Orlov (yellow card) 43'; Rebeja (yellow card) 53'; Ivanov 90+'	Report	Bratić (yellow card) 18'; Batak (yellow card) 47'; Tanasijević (yellow card) 50'	Stadium: Eduard Streltsov Stadium; Attendance: 3,500; Referee: Almir Kayumov

19 September 2004 23	Kuban Krasnodar	0–0	FC Moscow	Krasnodar
18:00 MSK (UTC+3)	Matiola (yellow card) 90+'	Report	Budunov (yellow card) 4'	Stadium: Kuban Stadium; Attendance: 17,500; Referee: Alexander Evstigneev

26 September 2004 24	FC Moscow	0–0	Alania Vladikavkaz	Moscow
18:00 MSK (UTC+3)	Stoica (yellow card) 44'; Tchuissé (yellow card) 45'	Report	Drozdov (yellow card) 29'; Karytska (yellow card) 34'; Agayev (yellow card) 67'; Barasa (yellow card) 79'	Stadium: Eduard Streltsov Stadium; Attendance: 4,500; Referee: Nikolai Ivanov

2 October 2004 25	Rostov	1–2	FC Moscow	Rostov-on-Don
17:00 MSK (UTC+3)	Pérez 15' (pen.); Coyle (yellow card) 40'; Aleksidze (yellow card) 80'	Report	Baltiev (yellow card) 43'; Melyoshin 49'; Adamu 51'; Orlov (yellow card) 76'; Stoica (yellow card) 90'	Stadium: Olimp-2; Attendance: 6,000; Referee: Vladimir Pettay

16 October 2004 26	FC Moscow	1–2	Lokomotiv Moscow	Moscow
16:00 MSK (UTC+3)	Melyoshin (yellow card) 11'; Tchuissé 62'; Rebeja (yellow card) 75'	Report	Sychev 4'; Maminov (yellow card) 32' (goal) 37'; Bilyaletdinov (yellow card) 34'; Ovchinnikov (yellow card) 90'	Stadium: Eduard Streltsov Stadium; Attendance: 6,500; Referee: Igor Zakharov

23 October 2004 27	Krylia Sovetov	2–1	FC Moscow	Samara
15:00 MSK (UTC+3)	Koroman (yellow card) 22'; Tikhonov 65' (pen.); Rôni 68'; Karyaka (yellow card) 72'; Kowba (yellow card) 73'	Report	Biletskyi (yellow card) 22'; Jop 25'; Kuzmin (yellow card) 55'; Bracamonte (yellow card) 58'; Tchuissé (yellow card) 77'; Tudor (yellow card) 84'	Stadium: Metallurg Stadium; Attendance: 17,000; Referee: Alexander Gonchar

29 October 2004 28	FC Moscow	2–3	Spartak Moscow	Moscow
19:00 MSK (UTC+3)	Rebeja (yellow card) 32'; Bracamonte 36'; Kuzmin 62'; Ivanov (yellow card) 75'	Report	Vidić 44'; Samedov (yellow card) 45'; Pjanović (yellow card) 45+' (goal) 47'; Jiránek (yellow card) 53'; Cavenaghi 90+'	Stadium: Eduard Streltsov Stadium; Attendance: 5,000; Referee: Aleksandr Kolobaev

7 November 2004 29	Zenit St.Petersburg	2–3	FC Moscow	Saint Petersburg
MSK (UTC+3)	Šumulikoski (yellow card) 18'; Denisov 42'; Arshavin (yellow card) 48'; Horshkov (yellow card) 64'; Šírl (yellow card) 89'; Hartig 90+'	Report	Biletskyi 22'; Adamu (yellow card) 55'; Melyoshin 64'; Budunov 84'; Karić (yellow card) 90+'	Stadium: Petrovsky Stadium; Attendance: 21,500; Referee: Igor Egorov

11 November 2004 30	FC Moscow	1–4	CSKA Moscow	Moscow
18:00 MSK (UTC+3)	Adamu 10' (yellow card) 61'; Kuzmin (yellow card) 79'	Report	Semak 43'; Vágner Love 49', 67'; Carvalho 60'	Stadium: Eduard Streltsov Stadium; Attendance: 9,000; Referee: Aleksandr Gvardis

==== League table ====
Pos	Team	Pld	W	D	L	GF	GA	GD	Pts
7	Saturn	30	10	11	9	37	30	+7	41
8	Spartak Moscow	30	11	7	12	43	44	−1	40
9	FC Moscow	30	10	10	10	38	39	−1	40
10	Rubin Kazan	30	7	12	11	32	31	+1	33
11	Amkar Perm	30	6	12	12	27	42	−15	30

Source: RSSSF
Rules for classification: 1st points; 2nd matches won; 3rd head-to-head (points, matches won, goal difference, goals scored, away goals scored); 4th goal difference

=== Russian Cup ===
==== 2004–05 ====
31 July 2004 Round of 32 1st leg	Yelets	1–3	FC Moscow	Yelets
18:00 MSK (UTC+3)	F.Paraschuk (yellow card) 31'; E.Osokin (yellow card) 45'; K.Bychkov 50'	Report	Adamu 27', 30'; Džiaukštas (yellow card) 69'; Karić (yellow card) 77'; Movsisyan 90'	Stadium: Trud Stadium; Attendance: 7,800; Referee: Sergey Lapochkin

10 August 2004 Round of 32 2nd leg	FC Moscow	5–0 (8–1 agg.)	Yelets	Moscow
MSK (UTC+3)	Karić (yellow card) 26'; Adamu 26' (pen.); Biletskyi 37'; Fredericks 61'; Budunov 65' (pen.); Baltiev 87'	Report	F.Paraschuk (yellow card) 64'	Stadium: Kryl'ya Sovetov Stadium; Attendance: 750; Referee: Vyacheslav Kurbanov

The Round of 16 games took place during the 2004 season.

== Squad statistics ==
As of match played 11 November 2004

=== Appearances and goals ===
No.	Pos	Nat	Player	Total		Premier League		Russian Cup	
No.	Pos	Nat	Player	Apps	Goals	Apps	Goals	Apps	Goals
1	GK	(Russia) RUS	Aleksandr Filimonov	27	0	26	0	1	0
3	DF	(Lithuania) LTU	Rolandas Džiaukštas	21	0	17+2	0	2	0
4	DF	(Bosnia and Herzegovina) BIH	Munever Rizvić	10	1	9	1	1	0
5	MF	(Moldova) MDA	Radu Rebeja	29	1	28+1	1	0	0
6	MF	(Russia) RUS	Sergey Shustikov	16	0	10+5	0	1	0
7	FW	(Armenia) ARM	Andrey Movsisyan	6	1	1+4	0	1	1
8	DF	(Romania) ROU	Pompiliu Stoica	11	0	8+3	0	0	0
10	FW	(Romania) ROU	Cristian Tudor	5	0	2+3	0	0	0
11	FW	(Russia) RUS	Budun Budunov	19	7	11+7	6	0+1	1
12	GK	(Russia) RUS	Vitali Astakhov	5	0	4	0	1	0
13	MF	(Ukraine) UKR	Maksym Biletskyi	22	2	14+7	1	1	1
14	DF	(Belarus) BLR	Syarhey Yaskovich	16	0	15+1	0	0	0
15	MF	(Russia) RUS	Valeri Leonov	13	0	4+7	0	2	0
18	DF	(Russia) RUS	Kirill Orlov	24	0	22+1	0	1	0
19	FW	(Argentina) ARG	Héctor Bracamonte	30	10	30	10	0	0
20	MF	(Russia) RUS	Aleksei Melyoshin	28	4	25+3	4	0	0
22	DF	(Russia) RUS	Oleg Kuzmin	8	1	5+2	1	0+1	0
23	FW	(Russia) RUS	Andrei Nikolayev	12	2	4+7	2	0+1	0
24	MF	(Kazakhstan) KAZ	Ruslan Baltiev	28	2	19+8	1	0+1	1
25	DF	(Poland) POL	Mariusz Jop	16	3	15	3	1	0
26	FW	(South Africa) RSA	Stanton Fredericks	3	1	0+2	0	1	1
28	FW	(Ghana) GHA	Baba Adamu	15	5	6+7	2	2	3
30	FW	(Latvia) LAT	Vladimirs Koļesņičenko	2	0	0+1	0	1	0
33	MF	(Russia) RUS	Aleksandr Ryazantsev	2	0	0+2	0	0	0
34	MF	(Russia) RUS	Vyacheslav Danilin	1	0	0	0	1	0
36	MF	(Russia) RUS	Ivan Bakulin	1	0	0	0	0+1	0
38	FW	(Russia) RUS	Andrei Kordun	1	0	0	0	0+1	0
77	MF	(Moldova) MDA	Stanislav Ivanov	15	2	8+6	2	1	0
99	DF	(Cameroon) CMR	Jerry-Christian Tchuissé	25	2	25	2	0	0
Players away from the club on loan:
Players who appeared for Moscow but left during the season:
2	DF	(Belarus) BLR	Andrey Astrowski	12	0	7+4	0	1	0
8	MF	(Azerbaijan) AZE	Narvik Sırxayev	15	2	13+1	2	1	0
21	DF	(Slovenia) SLO	Amir Karić	6	0	2+2	0	2	0
29	MF	(Argentina) ARG	Gustavo Pinto	1	0	0+1	0	0	0

=== Goal scorers ===
Place	Position	Nation	Number	Name	Premier League	Russian Cup	Total
1	FW	(Argentina)	19	Héctor Bracamonte	10	0	10
2	FW	(Russia)	11	Budun Budunov	6	1	7
3	FW	(Ghana)	28	Baba Adamu	2	3	5
4	MF	(Russia)	20	Aleksei Melyoshin	4	0	4
5	DF	(Poland)	25	Mariusz Jop	3	0	3
6	FW	(Russia)	23	Andrei Nikolayev	2	0	2
6	MF	(Azerbaijan)	8	Narvik Sırxayev	2	0	2
6	MF	(Moldova)	77	Stanislav Ivanov	2	0	2
6	DF	(Cameroon)	99	Jerry-Christian Tchuissé	2	0	2
6	MF	(Kazakhstan)	24	Ruslan Baltiev	1	1	2
6	MF	(Ukraine)	13	Maksym Biletskyi	1	1	2
12	DF	(Bosnia and Herzegovina)	4	Munever Rizvić	1	0	1
12	MF	(Moldova)	5	Radu Rebeja	1	0	1
12	DF	(Russia)	22	Oleg Kuzmin	1	0	1
12	FW	(Armenia)	7	Andrey Movsisyan	0	1	1
12	FW	(South Africa)	26	Stanton Fredericks	0	1	1
Total					38	8	46

=== Clean sheets ===
Place	Position	Nation	Number	Name	Premier League	Russian Cup	Total
1	GK	(Russia)	1	Aleksandr Filimonov	6	1	7
2	GK	(Russia)	12	Vitali Astakhov	1	0	1
TOTALS					7	1	8

=== Disciplinary record ===
Number	Nation	Position	Name	Premier League		Russian Cup		Total	
Number	Nation	Position	Name	Yellow card	Red card	Yellow card	Red card	Yellow card	Red card
3	(Lithuania)	DF	Rolandas Džiaukštas	4	0	1	0	5	0
4	(Bosnia and Herzegovina)	DF	Munever Rizvić	2	0	0	0	2	0
5	(Moldova)	MF	Radu Rebeja	5	0	0	0	5	0
6	(Russia)	MF	Sergey Shustikov	2	0	0	0	2	0
8	(Romania)	DF	Pompiliu Stoica	2	0	0	0	2	0
10	(Romania)	FW	Cristian Tudor	1	0	0	0	1	0
11	(Russia)	FW	Budun Budunov	5	0	0	0	5	0
13	(Ukraine)	MF	Maksym Biletskyi	4	0	0	0	4	0
14	(Belarus)	DF	Syarhey Yaskovich	7	1	0	0	7	1
18	(Russia)	DF	Kirill Orlov	5	0	0	0	5	0
19	(Argentina)	FW	Héctor Bracamonte	5	0	0	0	5	0
20	(Russia)	MF	Aleksei Melyoshin	4	0	0	0	4	0
22	(Russia)	DF	Oleg Kuzmin	2	0	0	0	2	0
24	(Kazakhstan)	MF	Ruslan Baltiev	4	0	0	0	4	0
25	(Poland)	DF	Mariusz Jop	1	0	0	0	1	0
26	(South Africa)	FW	Stanton Fredericks	1	0	0	0	1	0
28	(Ghana)	FW	Baba Adamu	2	0	0	0	2	0
77	(Moldova)	MF	Stanislav Ivanov	5	0	0	0	5	0
99	(Cameroon)	DF	Jerry-Christian Tchuissé	7	0	0	0	7	0
Players away on loan:
Players who left Moscow during the season:
2	(Belarus)	DF	Andrey Astrowski	1	0	0	0	1	0
8	(Azerbaijan)	MF	Narvik Sırxayev	1	0	0	0	1	0
21	(Slovenia)	DF	Amir Karić	2	0	2	0	4	0
29	(Argentina)	MF	Gustavo Pinto	1	0	0	0	1	0
Total				73	1	3	0	76	1
