= Lovchev =

Lovchev (Russian: Ловчев) is a Russian male surname, its feminine counterpart is Lovcheva. It may refer to

- Aleksey Lovchev (born 1989), Russian weightlifter
- German Lovchev (born 1981), Russian association football player
- Evgeniy Lovchev (born 1975), Russian association football player
- Evgeny Lovchev (born 1949), Russian association football official and player, father of Evgeniy
