= 2008 FC Moscow season =

Moscow
2008 season
- Manager: Oleg Blokhin
- Stadium: Eduard Streltsov Stadium
- Premier League: 9th
- Russian Cup: Progressed to 2009 season
- Top goalscorer: League: Héctor Bracamonte (8); All: Héctor Bracamonte (9)

The 2008 FC Moscow season was the club's 5th season in existence after taking over the licence of Torpedo-Metallurg in 2004. They finished the season in 9th place, and reached the Round of 16 in the Russian Cup, with the Quarterfinal taking place in the 2009 season.

== Squad ==
As of match played 22 November 2008

No.	Name	Nationality	Position	Date of birth (age)	Signed from	Signed in	Contract ends	Apps.	Goals
Goalkeepers
12	Valeriy Polyakov	(Russia)	GK	13 July 1989 (aged 19)	Rostov	2008		0	0
16	Anton Amelchenko	(Belarus)	GK	27 March 1985 (aged 23)	Gomel	2006		17	0
30	Yuri Zhevnov	(Belarus)	GK	17 April 1981 (aged 27)	BATE Borisov	2005		111	0
57	Nikita Alekseyev	(Russia)	GK	12 March 1990 (aged 18)	Youth Team	2008		0	0
58	Dmitriy Yershov	(Russia)	GK	12 June 1992 (aged 16)	Youth Team	2008		0	0
Defenders
2	Dmitri Godunok	(Russia)	DF	4 January 1976 (aged 32)	Tom Tomsk	2005		119	4
4	Roman Hubník	(Czech Republic)	DF	6 June 1984 (aged 24)	Sigma Olomouc	2007		12	1
14	Kirill Nababkin	(Russia)	DF	8 September 1986 (aged 22)	Youth Team	2004		49	0
15	Alexandru Epureanu	(Moldova)	DF	27 September 1986 (aged 22)	Sheriff Tiraspol	2007		57	1
22	Oleg Kuzmin	(Russia)	DF	9 May 1981 (aged 27)	Uralan Elista	2004		137	9
23	Isaac Okoronkwo	(Nigeria)	DF	1 May 1978 (aged 30)	Alania Vladikavkaz	2006		48	0
24	Vladimir Khozin	(Russia)	DF	3 July 1989 (aged 19)	Rostov	2008		0	0
25	Mariusz Jop	(Poland)	DF	3 August 1978 (aged 30)	Wisła Kraków	2004		97	4
27	Vitali Kaleshin	(Russia)	DF	3 October 1980 (aged 28)	Kuban Krasnodar	2008		22	2
31	Andrei Vasyanovich	(Russia)	DF	13 June 1988 (aged 20)	Krasnodar-2000	2008		0	0
32	Nikita Korolyov	(Russia)	DF	15 March 1988 (aged 20)	Youth Team	2007		0	0
33	Dacosta Goore	(Ivory Coast)	DF	31 December 1984 (aged 23)	Luch-Energiya Vladivostok	2008		8	0
40	Sergei Shubin	(Russia)	DF	16 February 1988 (aged 20)	Youth Team	2008		0	0
46	Aleksei Kontsedalov	(Russia)	DF	24 July 1990 (aged 18)	Rostov	2008		0	0
48	Aleksei Marshinskiy	(Russia)	DF	17 April 1988 (aged 18)	Youth Team	2007		0	0
49	Sergei Harlamov	(Russia)	DF	24 January 1991 (aged 17)	Spartak Moscow	2008		0	0
52	Pavel Golanov	(Russia)	DF	13 June 1989 (aged 19)	Youth Team	2008		0	0
Midfielders
3	Aleksandr Sheshukov	(Russia)	MF	15 April 1983 (aged 25)	Luch-Energiya Vladivostok	2008		14	0
6	Ricardo Baiano	(Bosnia and Herzegovina)	MF	10 September 1980 (aged 28)	loan from Spartak Nalchik	2008		10	0
7	Pyotr Bystrov	(Russia)	MF	15 July 1979 (aged 29)	Saturn Ramenskoye	2006		88	10
10	Zvonimir Vukić	(Serbia)	MF	19 July 1979 (aged 29)	Shakhtar Donetsk	2008		3	2
11	Tomáš Čížek	(Czech Republic)	MF	27 November 1978 (aged 29)	Rubin Kazan	2006		72	6
13	Aleksei Rebko	(Russia)	MF	23 April 1986 (aged 22)	Rubin Kazan	2008		20	2
17	Pavel Golyshev	(Russia)	MF	7 July 1987 (aged 21)	Youth Team	2005		23	2
19	Aleksandr Samedov	(Russia)	MF	19 July 1984 (aged 24)	Lokomotiv Moscow	2008		23	4
20	Aleksei Melyoshin	(Russia)	MF	30 January 1976 (aged 32)	Dynamo St.Petersburg	2004		83	11
28	Branislav Krunić	(Bosnia and Herzegovina)	MF	28 January 1979 (aged 29)	Tom Tomsk	2007	2009	44	3
36	Sergei Shudrov	(Russia)	MF	11 August 1989 (aged 19)	Rostov	2008		0	0
37	Aleksandr Stavpets	(Russia)	MF	4 July 1989 (aged 19)	Rostov	2008		19	2
38	Andrei Korobov	(Russia)	MF	17 July 1989 (aged 19)	Youth Team	2008		0	0
41	Artur Rylov	(Russia)	MF	12 April 1989 (aged 19)	Youth Team	2008		2	0
42	Denis Poyarkov	(Russia)	MF	16 October 1989 (aged 19)	Youth Team	2008		0	0
44	Oleg Aleynik	(Russia)	MF	8 February 1989 (aged 19)	Rostov	2008		0	0
47	Artyom Varakin	(Russia)	MF	21 April 1987 (aged 21)	Youth Team	2006		4	0
55	Dmitriy Kutepov	(Russia)	MF	6 June 1988 (aged 20)	Youth Team	2008		0	0
77	Stanislav Ivanov	(Moldova)	MF	7 October 1980 (aged 28)	Sheriff Tiraspol	2004		133	10
88	Edgaras Česnauskis	(Lithuania)	MF	5 February 1984 (aged 24)	Saturn Ramenskoye	2008		15	3
Forwards
18	Maxi López	(Argentina)	FW	3 April 1984 (aged 24)	Barcelona	2007		25	9
29	Igor Strelkov	(Russia)	FW	21 March 1982 (aged 26)	Tom Tomsk	2008	2011	15	1
45	Pavel Yesikov	(Russia)	FW	29 January 1988 (aged 20)	Youth Team	2006		0	0
48	Sergey Maslov	(Russia)	FW	3 September 1990 (aged 18)	Youth Team	2008		0	0
51	Aleksandr Marenich	(Russia)	FW	29 April 1989 (aged 19)	Rostov	2007		0	0
56	Stanislav Lantsov	(Russia)	FW	22 September 1990 (aged 18)	Youth Team	2007		0	0
69	Héctor Bracamonte	(Argentina)	FW	16 February 1978 (aged 30)	Boca Juniors	2004		142	33
Away on loan
9	Pablo Barrientos	(Argentina)	MF	17 January 1985 (aged 23)	San Lorenzo	2006		42	10
10	Maximiliano Moralez	(Argentina)	MF	27 February 1987 (aged 21)	Racing Club	2007	2011	7	0
50	Andrei Lukanchenkov	(Russia)	DF	7 February 1986 (aged 22)	Torpedo-Metallurg	2004		4	0
	Illya Hawrylaw	(Belarus)	GK	26 September 1988 (aged 20)	Dinamo Minsk	2007		0	0
Players that left Moscow during the season
5	Radu Rebeja	(Moldova)	MF	8 June 1973 (aged 35)	Saturn Ramenskoye	2004		127	3
8	Pompiliu Stoica	(Romania)	DF	10 September 1976 (aged 32)	Steaua București	2004		99	0
21	Roman Adamov	(Russia)	FW	21 June 1982 (aged 26)	Terek Grozny	2006		76	28

=== On loan ===
Note: Flags indicate national team as defined under FIFA eligibility rules; some limited exceptions apply. Players may hold more than one non-FIFA nationality.

No.	Pos.	Nation	Player
9	MF	ARG	Pablo Barrientos (at San Lorenzo)
10	FW	ARG	Maximiliano Moralez (at Racing Club)

No.	Pos.	Nation	Player
50	DF	RUS	Andrei Lukanchenkov (at Ural Yekaterinburg)
—	GK	BLR	Illya Hawrylaw (at Torpedo Zhodino)

=== Left club during season ===
Note: Flags indicate national team as defined under FIFA eligibility rules; some limited exceptions apply. Players may hold more than one non-FIFA nationality.

No.	Pos.	Nation	Player
5	MF	MDA	Radu Rebeja (to Khimki)
8	DF	ROU	Pompiliu Stoica (to Tom Tomsk)

No.	Pos.	Nation	Player
21	FW	RUS	Roman Adamov (to Rubin Kazan)

== Transfers ==
=== In ===
Date	Position	Nationality	Name	From	Fee	Ref.
9 January 2008	GK	(Russia)	Valeriy Polyakov	Rostov	Undisclosed	
9 January 2008	DF	(Russia)	Vitali Kaleshin	Kuban Krasnodar	Undisclosed	
9 January 2008	DF	(Russia)	Vladimir Khozin	Rostov	Undisclosed	
9 January 2008	DF	(Russia)	Sergei Shudrov	Rostov	Undisclosed	
9 January 2008	MF	(Russia)	Oleg Aleynik	Rostov	Undisclosed	
9 January 2008	MF	(Russia)	Aleksandr Stavpets	Rostov	Undisclosed	
Winter 2008	DF	(Russia)	Aleksei Kontsedalov	Rostov	Undisclosed	
Winter 2008	DF	(Russia)	Andrei Vasyanovich	Krasnodar-2000	Undisclosed	
Summer 2008	DF	(Russia)	Aleksandr Sheshukov	Luch-Energiya Vladivostok	Undisclosed	
Summer 2008	MF	(Lithuania)	Edgaras Česnauskis	Saturn Ramenskoye	Undisclosed	
Summer 2008	MF	(Russia)	Aleksei Rebko	Rubin Kazan	Undisclosed	
Summer 2008	MF	(Serbia)	Zvonimir Vukić	Shakhtar Donetsk	Undisclosed	
5 June 2008	FW	(Russia)	Igor Strelkov	Tom Tomsk	Undisclosed	
3 July 2008	MF	(Russia)	Aleksandr Samedov	Lokomotiv Moscow	$3,500,000	
3 September 2008	DF	(Ivory Coast)	Dacosta Goore	Luch-Energiya Vladivostok	Undisclosed	

=== Loans in ===
Date from	Position	Nationality	Name	To	Date to	Ref.
Summer 2008	MF	(Bosnia and Herzegovina)	Ricardo Baiano	Spartak Nalchik	End of Season	

=== Out ===
Date	Position	Nationality	Name	To	Fee	Ref.
Summer 2008	DF	(Romania)	Pompiliu Stoica	Tom Tomsk	Undisclosed	
Summer 2008	MF	(Moldova)	Radu Rebeja	Khimki	Undisclosed	
Summer 2008	FW	(Russia)	Roman Adamov	Rubin Kazan	Undisclosed	

=== Loans out ===
Date from	Position	Nationality	Name	To	Date to	Ref.
Winter 2008	GK	(Belarus)	Illya Hawrylaw	Dnepr Mogilev	Summer 2008	
Winter 2008	DF	(Russia)	Andrei Lukanchenkov	Ural Yekaterinburg	End of Season	
7 February 2008	MF	(Argentina)	Maximiliano Moralez	Racing Club	End of Season	
Summer 2008	GK	(Belarus)	Illya Hawrylaw	Torpedo Zhodino	End of Season	
23 August 2008	MF	(Argentina)	Pablo Barrientos	San Lorenzo	Summer 2009	

=== Released ===
Date	Position	Nationality	Name	Joined	Date
31 December 2019	DF	(Russia)	Dmitri Godunok	Alania Vladikavkaz	
31 December 2019	DF	(Russia)	Oleg Kuzmin	Lokomotiv Moscow	
31 December 2019	DF	(Russia)	Aleksei Marshinskiy		
31 December 2019	MF	(Czech Republic)	Tomáš Čížek	Baumit Jablonec	
31 December 2019	MF	(Moldova)	Stanislav Ivanov	Lokomotiv Moscow	
31 December 2019	MF	(Russia)	Pyotr Bystrov	Rubin Kazan	
31 December 2019	MF	(Russia)	Andrei Korobov		
31 December 2019	MF	(Russia)	Aleksei Melyoshin	Torpedo-ZIL	
31 December 2019	FW	(Russia)	Stanislav Lantsov		

== Competitions ==
=== Premier League ===
==== Results by round ====
Round	1	2	3	4	5	6	7	8	9	10	11	12	13	14	15	16	17	18	19	20	21	22	23	24	25	26	27	28	29	30
Ground	A	H	A	H	A	H	A	A	H	A	H	A	H	A	H	A	H	A	H	A	H	H	A	H	A	H	A	H	A	H
Result	D	L	L	D	L	D	D	W	L	W	D	D	D	W	L	L	W	W	L	D	W	L	W	W	D	D	D	L	L	W

Updated to match(es) played on 22 November 2008. Source: See Results
A = Away; H = Home; W = Win; D = Draw; L = Loss

==== Results ====
16 March 2008 1	Luch-Energiya Vladivostok	1–1	FC Moscow	Vladivostok
11:00 MSK (UTC+3)	Vujović (yellow card) 10'; Gvazava 47'; Novković (yellow card) 66' (yellow-red card) 77'	Report	Bystrov (yellow card) 45'; Čížek (yellow card) 57'; Kuzmin 62'; Adamov (yellow card) 82'	Stadium: Dynamo Stadium; Attendance: 10,200; Referee: Nikolai Ivanov

23 March 2008 2	FC Moscow	0–2	Zenit St.Petersburg	Moscow
16:00 MSK (UTC+3)	Kuzmin (yellow card) 2'; Rebeja (yellow card) 16'; Epureanu (yellow card) 48'; Barrientos (yellow card) 90'	Report	Arshavin 3'; Šírl (yellow card) 38'; Anyukov 60'; Tekke (yellow card) 78'	Stadium: Eduard Streltsov Stadium; Attendance: 8,000; Referee: Stanislav Sukhina

29 March 2008 3	Tom Tomsk	2–1	FC Moscow	Tomsk
14:30 MSK (UTC+3)	Skoblyakov 15' (pen.); Klimov (yellow card) 20'; Jokić 86'; Arkhipov (yellow card) 89'; Ajinjal (yellow card) 89'; Mladenov (yellow card) 90'	Report	Jop (yellow card) 12' (yellow-red card) 45+'; Bracamonte (yellow card) 23'; Kaleshin 26'	Stadium: Trud Stadium; Attendance: 14,000; Referee: Vladimir Pettay

4 April 2008 4	FC Moscow	2–2	Khimki	Moscow
19:00 MSK (UTC+3)	Bracamonte 34'; López 38'; Godunok (yellow card) 45' (yellow-red card) 88'; Rebeja (yellow card) 76'; Hubník (yellow card) 86'	Report	Samusiovas (yellow card) 36'; Nizamutdinov 45'; Mijailović (yellow card) 56'; Jovanović (yellow card) 74'; Antipenko 81'	Stadium: Eduard Streltsov Stadium; Attendance: 3,500; Referee: Vladislav Bezborodov

12 April 2008 5	Amkar Perm	2–0	FC Moscow	Perm
14:00 MSK (UTC+3)	Kushev 38'; Belorukov 68'	Report	López (yellow card) 24'	Stadium: Zvezda Stadium; Attendance: 17,200; Referee: Vitali Doroshenko

19 April 2008 6	FC Moscow	1–1	Dynamo Moscow	Moscow
15:30 MSK (UTC+3)	Epureanu 50' (yellow card) 73'; Krunić (yellow card) 62' (yellow-red card) 90'; Jop (yellow card) 69'	Report	Kerzhakov 44'; Tanasijević (yellow card) 61'; Semshov (yellow card) 85'; Karpovich (yellow card) 87'	Stadium: Eduard Streltsov Stadium; Attendance: 7,500; Referee: Yuri Baskakov

27 April 2008 7	Spartak Moscow	1–1	FC Moscow	Moscow
16:00 MSK (UTC+3)	Fathi (yellow card) 13' (yellow-red card) 90+'; Pavlenko 55'	Report	Adamov (yellow card) 67'; Bracamonte 69'	Stadium: Luzhniki Stadium; Attendance: 23,000; Referee: Aleksei Nikolaev

2 May 2008 8	Spartak Nalchik	0–3	FC Moscow	Nalchik
19:30 MSK (UTC+3)	Kazharov (yellow card) 16'; Kisenkov (yellow card) 41'; Geteriev (yellow card) 58'	Report	Adamov 20' (pen.), 24'; Godunok 61'; Epureanu (yellow card) 70'	Stadium: Spartak Stadium; Attendance: 8,000; Referee: Aleksandr Gvardis

7 May 2008 9	FC Moscow	1–2	Rubin Kazan	Moscow
MSK (UTC+3)	Kaleshin 34' (yellow card) 38'; Epureanu (yellow card) 59'	Report	Semak (yellow card) 57'; Kabze 61'; Ryazantsev (yellow card) 79' (goal) 88'; Sibaya (yellow card) 82'	Stadium: Eduard Streltsov Stadium; Attendance: 4,500; Referee: Stanislav Sukhina

10 May 2008 10	Shinnik Yaroslavl	0–1	FC Moscow	Yaroslavl
14:00 MSK (UTC+3)	Lazarov (yellow card) 45'	Report	Rebeja (yellow card) 36'; Godunok (yellow card) 39'; Bystrov 52'; Kaleshin (yellow card) 75'; Stoica (yellow card) 85'	Stadium: Shinnik Stadium; Attendance: 7,100; Referee: Igor Egorov

15 May 2008 11	FC Moscow	1–1	Krylia Sovetov	Moscow
20:30 MSK (UTC+3)	Epureanu (yellow card) 28'; López 72'; Bystrov (yellow card) 79'; Kaleshin (yellow card) 83'	Report	Jarošík 13'; Budylin (yellow card) 55'; Lobos (yellow card) 61'; Taranov (yellow card) 74'	Stadium: Eduard Streltsov Stadium; Attendance: 3,000; Referee: Nikolai Ivanov

5 July 2008 12	Saturn Ramenskoye	0–0	FC Moscow	Ramenskoye
MSK (UTC+3)	Eremenko (yellow card) 86'	Report	Jop (yellow card) 39'; Epureanu (yellow card) 60'; Kaleshin (yellow card) 70'	Stadium: Saturn Stadium; Attendance: 12,200; Referee: Vladislav Bezborodov

13 July 2008 13	FC Moscow	0–0	Terek Grozny	Moscow
MSK (UTC+3)	Bracamonte (yellow card) 23'	Report	Serdyukov (yellow card) 22'; Dzhabrailov (yellow card) 49'; Bouli (yellow card) 87'	Stadium: Eduard Streltsov Stadium; Attendance: 3,000; Referee: Vladimir Pettay

20 July 2008 14	CSKA Moscow	0–2	FC Moscow	Moscow
16:00 MSK (UTC+3)	Dzagoev (yellow card) 32'; Šemberas (yellow card) 62'	Report	Ivanov 5'; Česnauskis (yellow card) 31'; Rebko (yellow card) 39'; Čížek 70'	Stadium: Luzhniki Stadium; Attendance: 11,000; Referee: Aleksei Nikolaev

27 July 2008 15	FC Moscow	0–3	Lokomotiv Moscow	Moscow
16:00 MSK (UTC+3)	Samedov (yellow card) 57'	Report	Odemwingie 8', 55'; Glushakov 32'	Stadium: Eduard Streltsov Stadium; Attendance: 6,500; Referee: Aleksandr Gvardis

2 August 2008 16	Zenit St.Petersburg	2–1	FC Moscow	Saint Petersburg
16:00 MSK (UTC+3)	Šírl (yellow card) 32'; Denisov 51' (yellow card) 60'; Tekke 77' (yellow card) 77'	Report	Rebko 22'; Kuzmin (yellow card) 58'	Stadium: Petrovsky Stadium; Attendance: 21,000; Referee: Vitali Doroshenko

9 August 2008 17	FC Moscow	2–1	Tom Tomsk	Moscow
20:00 MSK (UTC+3)	Česnauskis 7'; Ivanov (yellow card) 36'; Godunok 60'	Report	Maznov 16'; Skoblyakov (yellow card) 20'; Klimov (yellow card) 32'; Vejić (yellow card) 36'	Stadium: Eduard Streltsov Stadium; Attendance: 1,700; Referee: Igor Egorov

17 August 2008 18	Khimki	0–2	FC Moscow	Khimki
15:00 MSK (UTC+3)	Stepanov (yellow card) 12' (yellow-red card) 88'; Danielson (yellow card) 67'; Kudryashov (yellow card) 75'	Report	Bystrov (yellow card) 9'; Ivanov 40'; Jop (yellow card) 45'; Čížek 80'; Rebko (yellow card) 90+'	Stadium: Arena Khimki; Attendance: 5,200; Referee: Yuri Baskakov

24 August 2008 19	FC Moscow	0–1	Amkar Perm	Moscow
20:00 MSK (UTC+3)	Godunok (yellow card) 57'; Kuzmin (yellow card) 58'; Rebko (yellow card) 78'	Report	Drinčić (yellow card) 59'; Popov (yellow card) 73'; Sikimić 90+'	Stadium: Eduard Streltsov Stadium; Attendance: 2,000; Referee: Vladimir Pettay

30 August 2008 20	Dynamo Moscow	1–1	FC Moscow	Moscow
MSK (UTC+3)	Kowalczyk (yellow card) 71'; D.Kombarov 88'	Report	Jop (yellow card) 54'; Epureanu (yellow card) 60'; Kuzmin (yellow card) 90+'; Rebko 90+'	Stadium: Dynamo Stadium; Attendance: 8,000; Referee: Vladislav Bezborodov

13 September 2008 21	FC Moscow	2–1	Spartak Moscow	Moscow
14:00 MSK (UTC+3)	Nababkin (yellow card) 21'; Bystrov (yellow card) 32'; Bracamonte 53' (pen.); Ivanov 63'; Goore (yellow card) 90+'	Report	Mozart (penalty missed) 4' (yellow card) 58'; Ryzhkov 15'; Filipenko (yellow card) 26'; Kováč (yellow card) 26'; Saenko (yellow card) 66'	Stadium: Eduard Streltsov Stadium; Attendance: 7,000; Referee: Igor Zakharov

21 September 2008 22	FC Moscow	1–3	Spartak Nalchik	Moscow
19:00 MSK (UTC+3)	Ivanov (yellow card) 40' (goal) 83'; Bracamonte (penalty missed) 69'; Česnauskis (yellow card) 85'	Report	Siradze (yellow card) 20' (goal) 53'; Šernas (yellow card) 36'; Samsonov 44'; Mashukov (yellow card) 56'; Kalimullin 65'	Stadium: Eduard Streltsov Stadium; Attendance: 2,000; Referee: Alexei Kovalev

28 September 2008 23	Rubin Kazan	0–1	FC Moscow	Kazan
18:00 MSK (UTC+3)	Semak (yellow card) 61'; Sharonov (yellow card) 87'	Report	Česnauskis (yellow card) 25'; Bracamonte 40'; Goore (yellow card) 47'; Bystrov (yellow card) 67'	Stadium: Central Stadium; Attendance: 12,000; Referee: Aleksandr Gvardis

5 October 2008 24	FC Moscow	2–1	Shinnik Yaroslavl	Moscow
19:00 MSK (UTC+3)	Samedov 22'; Nababkin (yellow card) 55'; Bracamonte 60'	Report	Monaryov (yellow card) 53'; Kudryashov 90+'	Stadium: Eduard Streltsov Stadium; Attendance: 1,500; Referee: Vladislav Bezborodov

19 October 2008 25	Krylia Sovetov	1–1	FC Moscow	Samara
16:15 MSK (UTC+3)	Koller 26'; Jarošík (yellow card) 37'	Report	Samedov (yellow card) 9'; Kuzmin (yellow card) 14'; Bracamonte 37'; Krunić (yellow card) 90+'	Stadium: Metallurg Stadium; Attendance: 15,000; Referee: Ildus Biglov

26 October 2008 26	FC Moscow	0–0	Saturn Ramenskoye	Moscow
17:30 MSK (UTC+3)	Okoronkwo (yellow card) 26' (red card) 27'; Samedov (yellow card) 66'; Epureanu (yellow card) 70'; Bystrov (yellow card) 90'	Report	Topić (penalty missed) 28' (yellow card) 86'; Ďurica (yellow card) 59'; Karyaka (yellow card) 62'	Stadium: Eduard Streltsov Stadium; Attendance: 3,500; Referee: Sergei Karasev

2 November 2008 27	Terek Grozny	1–1	FC Moscow	Grozny
MSK (UTC+3)	Zabavník (yellow card) 12'; Iliev (yellow card) 29' (goal) 90+5'; Bouli (yellow card) 80'	Report	Vukić 49'; Nababkin (yellow card) 67'; Goore (yellow card) 75'	Stadium: Sultan Bilimkhanov Stadium; Attendance: 9,800; Referee: Stanislav Sukhina

10 November 2008 28	FC Moscow	1–4	CSKA Moscow	Moscow
19:00 MSK (UTC+3)	Bystrov (yellow card) 12'; Jop (yellow card) 35'; Samedov (yellow card) 40'; Vukić (yellow card) 45'; Bracamonte 80'	Report	Vágner Love 6', 23', 54', 61' (yellow card) 52'; Ignashevich (yellow card) 42'; Krasić (yellow card) 65'; V.Berezutski (yellow card) 88'	Stadium: Eduard Streltsov Stadium; Attendance: 6,500; Referee: Maksim Layushkin

16 November 2008 29	Lokomotiv Moscow	3–2	FC Moscow	Moscow
14:00 MSK (UTC+3)	Sychev 10', 35' (red card) FT; Glushakov 38'	Report	Samedov 58' (yellow card) 82' (yellow-red card) FT; Bracamonte 77' (yellow card) 90+'; Kuzmin (yellow card) 84'; Bystrov (yellow card) 86'	Stadium: RZD Arena; Attendance: 9,725; Referee: Aleksei Nikolaev

22 November 2008 30	FC Moscow	3–0	Luch-Energiya Vladivostok	Moscow
14:00 MSK (UTC+3)	Ivanov (yellow card) 62'; López 78' (pen.); Vukić 87'; Stavpets 90'	Report	Kristić (yellow card) 41'; D.N.Smirnov (yellow card) 78'	Stadium: Eduard Streltsov Stadium; Attendance: 1,500; Referee: Nikolai Ivanov

==== League table ====
Pos	Team	Pld	W	D	L	GF	GA	GD	Pts
7	Lokomotiv Moscow	30	13	8	9	37	32	+5	47
8	Spartak Moscow	30	11	11	8	43	39	+4	44
9	FC Moscow	30	9	11	10	34	36	−2	38
10	Terek Grozny	30	9	8	13	28	42	−14	35
11	Saturn	30	7	12	11	26	30	−4	33

Source: RFPL (in Russian)
Rules for classification: 1st points; 2nd matches won; 3rd head-to-head (points, matches won, goal difference, goals scored, away goals scored); 4th goal difference; 5th goals scored; 6th away goals scored; 7th position in previous season or decision game

=== Russian Cup ===
==== 2008–09 ====
6 August 2008 Round of 32	Alania Vladikavkaz	1–3	FC Moscow	Vladikavkaz
19:00 MSK (UTC+3)	Dadu 20' (pen.) (yellow card) 66'; Bestayev (yellow card) 79'; Varziyev (yellow card) 89'	Report	Godunok 8'; Bracamonte 33'; Stavpets 60'; Rebko (yellow card) 66'	Stadium: Republican Spartak Stadium; Attendance: 5,000; Referee: Yuri Klyuchnikov

24 September 2008 Round of 16	FC Moscow	3–0	Terek Grozny	Moscow
18:00 MSK (UTC+3)	Kuzmin 27' (pen.), 84' (pen.); Česnauskis 49'; Jop (yellow card) 69'	Report	Bendz (yellow card) 69'; Karčev (red card) 84'	Stadium: Eduard Streltsov Stadium; Attendance: 683; Referee: Vladimir Kazmenko

=== UEFA Cup ===
14 August 2008 Second qualifying round 1st leg	Legia Warsaw (Poland)	1–2	(Russia) FC Moscow	Warsaw, Poland
20:00 MSK (UTC+3)	Ḱumbev (yellow card) 49'; Guerreiro 66'; Radović (yellow card) 83'	Report	Kaleshin (yellow card) 40'; Česnauskis 53' (yellow card) 83'; Samedov 63'; Godunok (yellow card) 70'; Ivanov (yellow card) 90'	Stadium: Polish Army Stadium; Referee: Jouni Hyytiä (Finland)

28 August 2008 Second qualifying round 2nd leg	FC Moscow (Russia)	2–0 (4–1 agg.)	(Poland) Legia Warsaw	Moscow, Russia
18:00 MSK (UTC+3)	Strelkov 6'; Sheshukov (yellow card) 38'; Kuzmin 50'; Kaleshin (yellow card) 82'	Report	Kiełbowicz (yellow card) 45'; Guerreiro (red card) 79'	Stadium: Eduard Streltsov Stadium; Referee: Paolo Dondarini (Italy)

18 September 2008 First Round 1st leg	FC Moscow (Russia)	1–2	(Denmark) Copenhagen	Moscow, Russia
18:00 MSK (UTC+3)	Jop (yellow card) 45'; Kuzmin (yellow card) 47'; Samedov 90+1'	Report	Nordstrand 45' (pen.); Pospěch (yellow card) 77'; Kvist (yellow card) 86'; Sionko 90+3'	Stadium: Eduard Streltsov Stadium; Attendance: 6,000; Referee: Carlo Bertolini (Switzerland)

2 October 2008 First Round 2nd leg	Copenhagen (Denmark)	1–1 (3–2 agg.)	(Russia) FC Moscow	Copenhagen, Denmark
22:45 MSK (UTC+3)	Kvist (yellow card) 40'; Sheshukov 54' (o.g.)	Report	Bracamonte 37'; Godunok (yellow card) 61'; Bystrov (yellow card) 66'; Sheshukov (yellow card) 83'; Ivanov (yellow card) 90'	Stadium: Parken Stadium; Attendance: 18,350; Referee: Serge Gumienny (Belgium)

== Squad statistics ==
As of match played 22 November 2008

=== Appearances and goals ===
No.	Pos	Nat	Player	Total		Premier League		2008–09 Russian Cup		UEFA Cup	
No.	Pos	Nat	Player	Apps	Goals	Apps	Goals	Apps	Goals	Apps	Goals
2	DF	(Russia) RUS	Dmitri Godunok	29	3	24	2	1	1	4	0
3	MF	(Russia) RUS	Aleksandr Sheshukov	14	0	9+1	0	2	0	2	0
4	DF	(Czech Republic) CZE	Roman Hubník	4	0	4	0	0	0	0	0
6	MF	(Bosnia and Herzegovina) BIH	Ricardo Baiano	10	0	4+4	0	0	0	1+1	0
7	MF	(Russia) RUS	Pyotr Bystrov	25	1	18+1	1	2	0	4	0
10	MF	(Serbia) SRB	Zvonimir Vukić	3	2	2+1	2	0	0	0	0
11	MF	(Czech Republic) CZE	Tomáš Čížek	14	2	11+2	2	0	0	1	0
13	MF	(Russia) RUS	Aleksei Rebko	20	2	12+4	2	0+2	0	1+1	0
14	DF	(Russia) RUS	Kirill Nababkin	20	0	13+2	0	1	0	4	0
15	DF	(Moldova) MDA	Alexandru Epureanu	29	1	15+9	1	1+1	0	2+1	0
16	GK	(Belarus) BLR	Anton Amelchenko	12	0	10	0	1	0	1	0
17	MF	(Russia) RUS	Pavel Golyshev	5	0	2+3	0	0	0	0	0
18	FW	(Argentina) ARG	Maxi López	15	3	8+5	3	1	0	1	0
19	MF	(Russia) RUS	Aleksandr Samedov	23	4	14+3	2	2	0	3+1	2
20	MF	(Russia) RUS	Aleksei Melyoshin	1	0	0+1	0	0	0	0	0
22	DF	(Russia) RUS	Oleg Kuzmin	32	4	27	1	2	2	3	1
23	DF	(Nigeria) NGA	Isaac Okoronkwo	5	0	5	0	0	0	0	0
25	DF	(Poland) POL	Mariusz Jop	28	0	21+2	0	1+1	0	3	0
27	DF	(Russia) RUS	Vitali Kaleshin	22	2	15+4	2	1	0	2	0
28	FW	(Bosnia and Herzegovina) BIH	Branislav Krunić	16	0	4+10	0	1+1	0	0	0
29	FW	(Russia) RUS	Igor Strelkov	15	1	5+6	0	1	0	2+1	1
30	GK	(Belarus) BLR	Yuri Zhevnov	24	0	20	0	1	0	3	0
33	DF	(Ivory Coast) CIV	Dacosta Goore	8	0	8	0	0	0	0	0
37	MF	(Russia) RUS	Aleksandr Stavpets	19	2	5+10	1	1	1	1+2	0
41	MF	(Russia) RUS	Artur Rylov	2	0	0+2	0	0	0	0	0
47	MF	(Russia) RUS	Artyom Varakin	2	0	1+1	0	0	0	0	0
69	FW	(Argentina) ARG	Héctor Bracamonte	32	10	23+4	8	1	1	1+3	1
77	MF	(Moldova) MDA	Stanislav Ivanov	28	4	20+3	4	1	0	3+1	0
88	MF	(Lithuania) LTU	Edgaras Česnauskis	15	3	9+1	1	1+1	1	2+1	1
Players away from the club on loan:
9	MF	(Argentina) ARG	Pablo Barrientos	3	0	2+1	0	0	0	0	0
Players who appeared for Moscow but left during the season:
5	MF	(Moldova) MDA	Radu Rebeja	8	0	4+4	0	0	0	0	0
8	DF	(Romania) ROU	Pompiliu Stoica	10	0	9+1	0	0	0	0	0
21	FW	(Russia) RUS	Roman Adamov	8	2	6+2	2	0	0	0	0

=== Goal scorers ===
Place	Position	Nation	Number	Name	Premier League	2008–09 Russian Cup	UEFA Cup	Total
1	FW	(Argentina)	69	Héctor Bracamonte	8	1	1	10
2	MF	(Moldova)	77	Stanislav Ivanov	4	0	0	4
2	MF	(Russia)	19	Aleksandr Samedov	2	0	2	4
2	DF	(Russia)	22	Oleg Kuzmin	1	2	1	4
5	FW	(Argentina)	18	Maxi López	3	0	0	3
5	DF	(Russia)	2	Dmitri Godunok	2	1	0	3
5	MF	(Lithuania)	88	Edgaras Česnauskis	1	1	1	3
8	FW	(Russia)	21	Roman Adamov	2	0	0	2
8	DF	(Russia)	27	Vitali Kaleshin	2	0	0	2
8	MF	(Czech Republic)	11	Tomáš Čížek	2	0	0	2
8	MF	(Russia)	13	Aleksei Rebko	2	0	0	2
8	MF	(Serbia)	10	Zvonimir Vukić	2	0	0	2
8	MF	(Russia)	37	Aleksandr Stavpets	1	1	0	2
14	DF	(Moldova)	15	Alexandru Epureanu	1	0	0	1
14	MF	(Russia)	7	Pyotr Bystrov	1	0	0	1
14	FW	(Russia)	29	Igor Strelkov	0	0	1	1
Total					34	6	6	46

=== Clean sheets ===
Place	Position	Nation	Number	Name	Premier League	2008–09 Russian Cup	UEFA Cup	Total
1	GK	(Belarus)	30	Yuri Zhevnov	7	1	1	9
1	GK	(Belarus)	16	Anton Amelchenko	2	0	0	2
TOTALS					9	1	1	11

=== Disciplinary record ===
Number	Nation	Position	Name	Premier League		2008–09 Russian Cup		UEFA Cup		Total	
Number	Nation	Position	Name	Booked	Sent off (straight red)	Booked	Sent off (straight red)	Booked	Sent off (straight red)	Booked	Sent off (straight red)
2	(Russia)	DF	Dmitri Godunok	4	1	0	0	2	0	2	0
3	(Russia)	MF	Aleksandr Sheshukov	0	0	0	0	1	0	1	0
4	(Czech Republic)	DF	Roman Hubník	1	0	0	0	0	0	1	0
7	(Russia)	MF	Pyotr Bystrov	8	0	0	0	1	0	5	0
10	(Serbia)	MF	Zvonimir Vukić	1	0	0	0	0	0	1	0
11	(Czech Republic)	MF	Tomáš Čížek	1	0	0	0	0	0	1	0
13	(Russia)	MF	Aleksei Rebko	3	0	1	0	0	0	1	0
14	(Russia)	DF	Kirill Nababkin	3	0	0	0	0	0	1	0
15	(Moldova)	DF	Alexandru Epureanu	8	0	0	0	0	0	1	0
18	(Argentina)	FW	Maxi López	1	0	0	0	0	0	1	0
19	(Russia)	MF	Aleksandr Samedov	6	1	0	0	1	0	1	0
22	(Russia)	DF	Oleg Kuzmin	6	0	0	0	1	0	2	0
23	(Nigeria)	DF	Isaac Okoronkwo	1	1	0	0	0	0	1	1
25	(Poland)	DF	Mariusz Jop	7	1	1	0	1	0	2	0
27	(Russia)	DF	Vitali Kaleshin	4	0	0	0	2	0	2	0
28	(Bosnia and Herzegovina)	FW	Branislav Krunić	3	1	0	0	0	0	1	0
33	(Ivory Coast)	DF	Dacosta Goore	3	0	0	0	0	0	1	0
69	(Argentina)	FW	Héctor Bracamonte	3	0	0	0	0	0	1	0
77	(Moldova)	MF	Stanislav Ivanov	3	0	0	0	2	0	2	0
88	(Lithuania)	MF	Edgaras Česnauskis	3	0	0	0	1	0	1	0
Players away on loan:
9	(Argentina)	MF	Pablo Barrientos	1	0	0	0	0	0	1	0
Players who left Moscow during the season:
5	(Moldova)	MF	Radu Rebeja	3	0	0	0	0	0	2	0
8	(Romania)	DF	Pompiliu Stoica	1	0	0	0	0	0	1	0
21	(Russia)	FW	Roman Adamov	2	0	0	0	0	0	1	0
Total				76	5	2	0	12	0	90	5
