= Stanton Fredericks =

South African footballer

Personal information
- Full name: Stanton Duncan Fredericks
- Date of birth: 13 June 1977 (age 49)
- Place of birth: Johannesburg, South Africa
- Height: 1.80 m (5 ft 11 in)
- Position: Midfielder

Senior career*
Years	Team	Apps	(Gls)
1995–2001	Wits University	115	(18)
2000–2001	Grasshopper Club Zürich	16	(0)
2001–2004	Kaizer Chiefs	79	(22)
2004–2006	FC Moscow	13	(0)
2006–2007	Orlando Pirates	9	(0)
2006–2008	→ Supersport United (loan)	7	(0)
2007–2010	Pierikos	77	(25)
2010–2013	Bidvest Wits	37	(4)

International career
1995–1997	South Africa U20	19	(1)
2002–2004	South Africa	24	(2)
- * Club domestic league appearances and goals

Stanton "Stiga" Fredericks (born 13 June 1977) is a South African former association football player who played as midfielder and has represented South Africa. Stanton retired from football in May 2013.

== Career ==
While playing for Kaizer Chiefs, Fredericks scored one of the goals in the final of the 2003 Coca-Cola Cup, at the time the richest cup tournament in Africa.

While playing for Orlando Pirates, Fredericks previously had a loan spell at Supersport United. He also spent three seasons with FC Moscow, appearing in 13 Russian Premier League matches.

== Career statistics ==
As of match played 15 July 2015

Appearances and goals by club, season and competition
Club	Season	League			National Cup		League Cup		Continental		Other		Total	
Club	Season	Division	Apps	Goals	Apps	Goals	Apps	Goals	Apps	Goals	Apps	Goals	Apps	Goals
FC Moscow	2004	Russian Premier League	2	0	1	1	-						3	1
FC Moscow	2005	Russian Premier League	11	0	3	0	-						14	0
FC Moscow	2006	Russian Premier League	0	0	1	0	-		0	0	-		1	0
FC Moscow	Total		13	0	5	1	-	-	0	0	-	-	18	1
Total			13	0	5	1	-	-	0	0	-	-	18	1

=== International ===
South Africa national team
Year	Apps	Goals
2002	3	1
2003	18	1
2004	3	0
Total	24	2

Statistics accurate as of match played 31 January 2004
