= Kirill Orlov =

Russian footballer

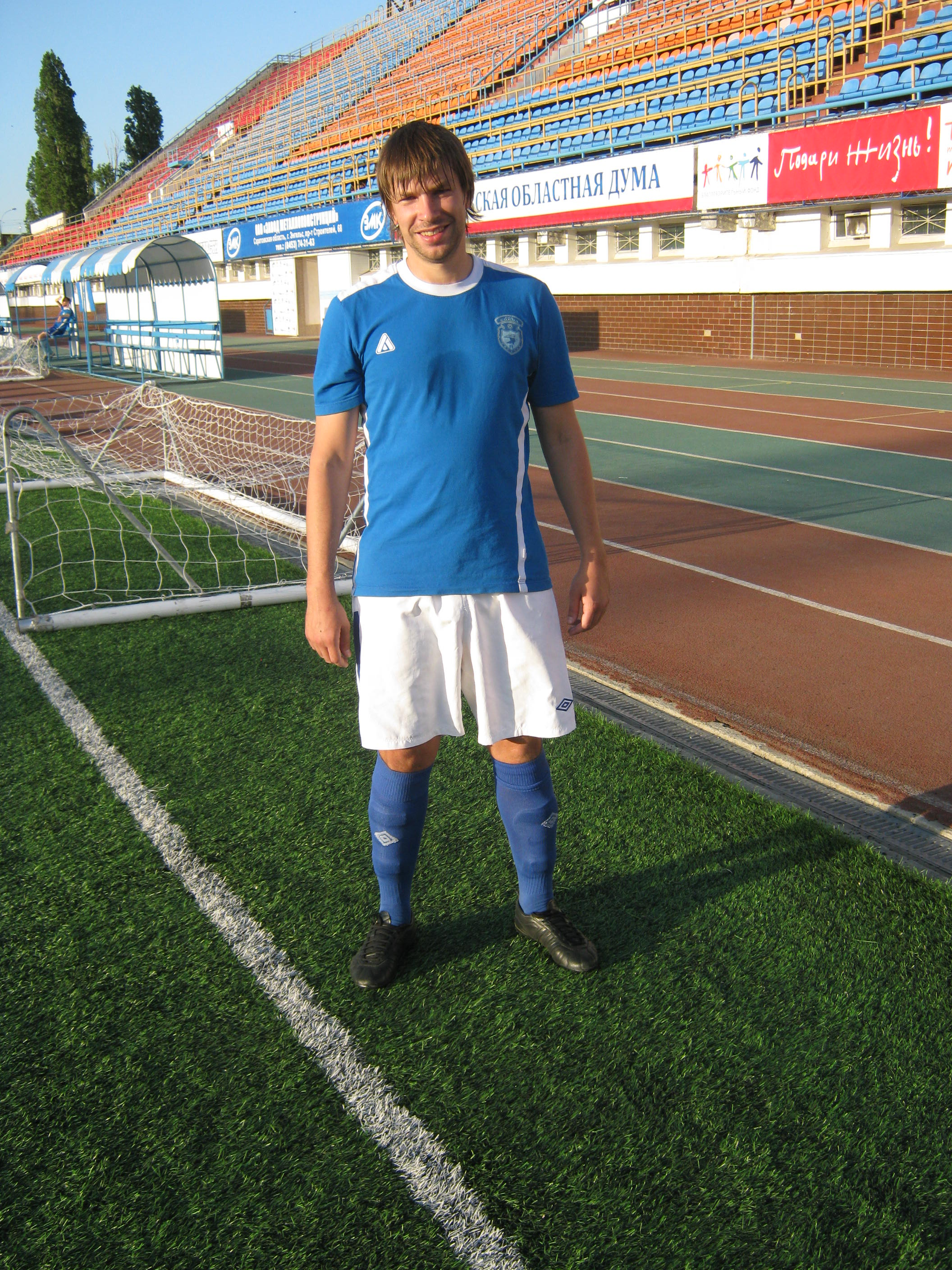

Personal information
- Full name: Kirill Yevgenyevich Orlov
- Date of birth: 18 January 1983 (age 43)
- Height: 1.79 m (5 ft 10 in)
- Position: Defender

Youth career
- FC Torpedo-ZIL Moscow

Senior career*
Years	Team	Apps	(Gls)
2001–2005	FC Moscow	41	(0)
2005–2006	FC Rostov	25	(0)
2007	FC Khimki	27	(0)
2008–2010	FC Sibir Novosibirsk	43	(0)
2011	FC Salyut Belgorod	6	(0)
2011–2012	FC Sokol Saratov	21	(0)

International career
2000	Russia U-17	7	(1)
2003–2004	Russia U-21	3	(0)
- * Club domestic league appearances and goals

Kirill Yevgenyevich Orlov (Russian: Кирилл Евгеньевич Орлов; born 18 January 1983) is a Russian former professional footballer.

== Club career ==
He made his debut in the Russian Premier League in 2001 for FC Torpedo-ZIL Moscow.
