= Vitali Astakhov =

Russian professional footballer

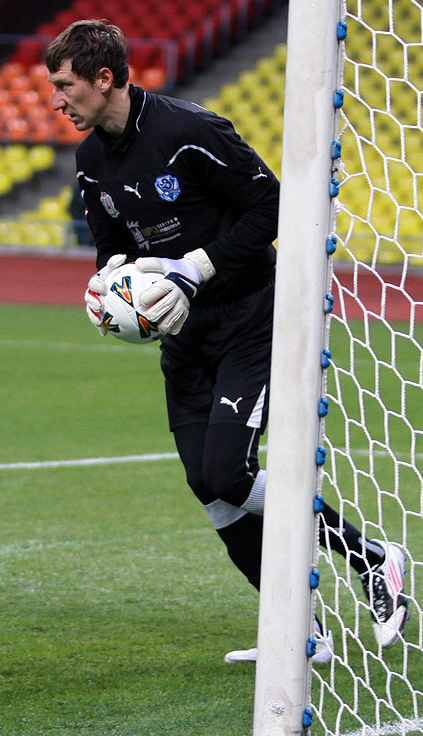
- With Volga in 2012

Personal information
- Full name: Vitali Gennadyevich Astakhov
- Date of birth: 9 January 1979 (age 47)
- Place of birth: Kuybyshev, Russian SFSR
- Height: 1.90 m (6 ft 3 in)
- Position: Goalkeeper

Youth career
- FC Torpedo-ZIL Moscow

Senior career*
Years	Team	Apps	(Gls)
2000–2004	FC Moscow	12	(0)
2005	FC Fakel Voronezh	17	(0)
2006	FC Sodovik Sterlitamak	24	(0)
2007	FC Baltika Kaliningrad	15	(0)
2008–2012	FC Volga Nizhny Novgorod	87	(0)
2012–2013	FC Tom Tomsk	13	(0)
2013–2014	FC Gazovik Orenburg	17	(0)
2014–2015	FC Syzran-2003	22	(0)
- * Club domestic league appearances and goals

Vitali Gennadyevich Astakhov (Russian: Виталий Геннадьевич Астахов; born 9 January 1979) is a Russian former professional footballer.

== Club career ==
He made his debut in the Russian Premier League in 2002 for FC Torpedo-ZIL Moscow.
