= Héctor Bracamonte =

Argentine footballer

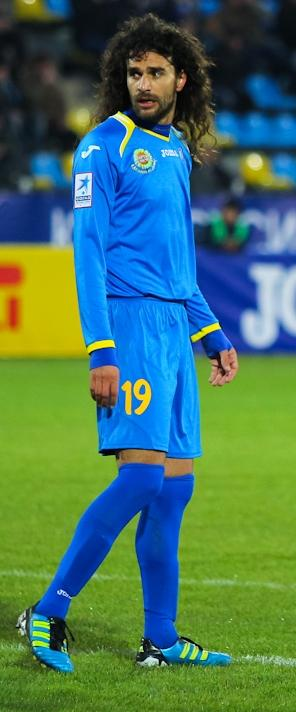
- With Rostov in 2012

Personal information
- Full name: Héctor Andrés Bracamonte
- Date of birth: 16 February 1978 (age 48)
- Place of birth: Río Cuarto, Argentina
- Height: 1.90 m (6 ft 3 in)
- Position: Striker

Senior career*
Years	Team	Apps	(Gls)
1998–1999	Boca Juniors	1	(0)
1999–2000	Los Andes	26	(9)
2000–2002	Badajoz	85	(18)
2002–2003	Boca Juniors	32	(16)
2003	Torpedo-ZIL Moscow	9	(5)
2004–2009	FC Moscow	136	(30)
2009–2011	Terek Grozny	38	(4)
2011–2012	Rostov	24	(6)
2012–2013	Rosario Central	9	(1)
2013–2014	Sarmiento	0	(0)
Total		360	(89)

Managerial career
- 2015–2019: Boca Juniors (youth)
- 2022: Cerro Largo
- * Club domestic league appearances and goals

Héctor Andrés Bracamonte (born 16 February 1978) is an Argentine football manager and former player who played as a striker.

== Career ==
Born in Río Cuarto, Córdoba, Bracamonte started his career at Boca Juniors 1998, he played only 1 game for the club before moving down a division to the Argentine 2nd division with Club Atlético Los Andes before moving to Spain to play for CD Badajoz.

In 2002 Bracamonte returned to Argentina to play for Boca again, but after only one season he moved to Russia to play for Torpedo Metallurg (renamed FC Moscow the same season). He made a total of 39 appearances during his second spell at Boca in all competitions, scoring 17 goals.

In 2003 Bracamonte played nine matches for Torpedo Metallurg, scoring five goals. Bracamonte scored 10 goals in 30 matches and became the club's top scorer the following season. He became popular with the Moscow fans due to his various stylish haircuts. Once he wore long curly hair Bracamonte was nicknamed "Pushkin" (a Russian famous poet).

During the season 2005 he scored six goals in 27 matches including the one against FC Spartak Moscow that resembled the famous Diego Maradona's Goal of the Century, dribbling past three opponents and the goalkeeper.

Bracamonte is FC Moscow's record holder for most league games played for the club with 145 appearances. On 29 July 2009 FC Terek Grozny signed Bracamonte from FC Moscow on a two-year deal. Whilst Ruud Gullit was manager of Terek, Bracamonte was a player-coach. Bracamonte left Terek in the summer of 2011, and moved to fellow Russian Premier League side FC Rostov. Bracamonte left Rostov In June 2012 upon the completion of his one-year contract.

== Coaching career ==
In 2015, Baracamonte returned to Boca Juniors, this time as a youth coach. He was released at the end of 2019. On 16 January 2020, he was hired as a youth coordinator at Huracan. He resigned in March 2021.

== Career statistics ==
=== Club ===
As of match played 13 May 2012

Appearances and goals by club, season and competition
Club	Season	League			National Cup		Continental		Other		Total	
Club	Season	Division	Apps	Goals	Apps	Goals	Apps	Goals	Apps	Goals	Apps	Goals
Torpedo-ZIL Moscow	2003	Russian Premier League	9	5	1	1	—				10	6
FC Moscow	2004	Russian Premier League	30	10	0	0	-				30	10
FC Moscow	2005	Russian Premier League	25	5	2	1	-				27	6
FC Moscow	2006	Russian Premier League	24	3	2	0	4	0	-		30	3
FC Moscow	2007	Russian Premier League	17	2	6	2	-				23	4
FC Moscow	2008	Russian Premier League	27	8	1	1	4	1	-		32	10
FC Moscow	2009	Russian Premier League	13	2	2	1	-				15	3
FC Moscow	Total		136	30	13	5	8	1	-	-	157	36
Terek Grozny	2009	Russian Premier League	2	0	0	0	-				2	0
Terek Grozny	2010	Russian Premier League	28	4	0	0	-				28	4
Terek Grozny	2011–12	Russian Premier League	7	0	1	0	-				8	0
Terek Grozny	Total		37	4	1	0	-	-	-	-	38	4
Rostov	2011–12	Russian Premier League	24	6	3	1	—		1	0	28	7
Career total			197	40	17	6	8	1	1	0	223	47
