= Sergei Sharin =

Russian footballer

Personal information
- Full name: Sergei Yuryevich Sharin
- Date of birth: 5 August 1984 (age 42)
- Height: 1.76 m (5 ft 9 1/2 in)
- Positions: Midfielder; forward

Youth career
- FC Torpedo-ZIL Moscow
- GUOR Bronnitsy

Senior career*
Years	Team	Apps	(Gls)
2002–2005	FC Moscow	0	(0)
2004	→ FC Metallurg Krasnoyarsk (loan)	27	(6)
2005	→ FC Chkalovets-1936 Novosibirsk (loan)	37	(0)
2006–2007	FC Sibir Novosibirsk	70	(2)
2008–2009	FC Vityaz Podolsk	55	(4)
2010–2012	FC Yenisey Krasnoyarsk	35	(3)
2011	→ FC Mostovik-Primorye Ussuriysk (loan)	7	(1)
2012–2013	FC Kaluga	22	(0)
2013–2014	FC Sakhalin Yuzhno-Sakhalinsk	22	(0)
2014–2015	FC Vityaz Podolsk	13	(0)
2016	FC Olimpik Mytishchi		
2017	FC Rassvet-Restavratsiya Krasnoyarsk		
2017	FC Prialit Reutov		
2018	FC Achinsk		
- * Club domestic league appearances and goals

Sergei Yuryevich Sharin (Russian: Серге́й Юрьевич Шарин; born 5 August 1984) is a former Russian professional football player.

== Club career ==
He played 6 seasons in the Russian Football National League for FC Sibir Novosibirsk, FC Vityaz Podolsk and FC Yenisey Krasnoyarsk.
