= Aleksandar Komadina =

Serbian footballer

Personal information
- Date of birth: 8 November 1975 (age 51)
- Place of birth: Niš, SFR Yugoslavia
- Height: 1.93 m (6 ft 4 in)
- Position: Centre-back

Senior career*
Years	Team	Apps	(Gls)
1995–1996	Radnički Niš	6	(0)
1999–2000	Železničar Niš	31	(0)
2000	Zimbru Chișinău	1	(0)
2001	Kuban Krasnodar	9	(1)
2002–2003	Torpedo-Metallurg	28	(0)
2004	Khimki	31	(3)
2005	Zhenis Astana	14	(2)
2007–2008	Jagodina	27	(6)
2008–2010	Smederevo	52	(4)
2010–2012	Sinđelić Niš	38	(2)
- * Club domestic league appearances and goals

Aleksandar Komadina (Serbian Cyrillic: Александар Комадина; born 8 November 1975) is a Serbian former football defender.

After initially playing with his hometown clubs Radnički Niš and Železničar Niš, Komadina went on to play abroad, firstly in Moldova with Zimbru Chișinău and later in Russia with Kuban Krasnodar, Torpedo-Metallurg and Khimki. He also played with Zhenis Astana in Kazakhstan, before returning to his homeland in 2007. In the following five years, Komadina played with Jagodina, Smederevo and Sinđelić Niš.

In 2019 Sinđelić almost went bankrupt due to money they still owed Komadina who had signed a controversially lucrative contract with the club in 2012.
