= Syarhey Yaskovich =

Belarusian footballer (born 1972)

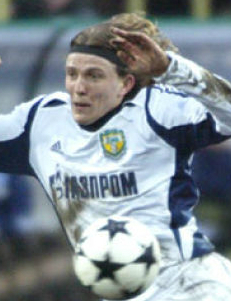
- Yaskovich for FC Tom in 2005

Personal information
- Date of birth: 14 January 1972 (age 54)
- Place of birth: Pinsk, Brest Oblast, Byelorussian SSR, Soviet Union
- Height: 1.83 m (6 ft 0 in)
- Position: Defender

Youth career
- 1990–1991: Dinamo Minsk

Senior career*
Years	Team	Apps	(Gls)
1991	Dinamo Minsk	0	(0)
1992–1994	Dinamo-93 Minsk	70	(4)
1994–1997	Dinamo Minsk	68	(0)
1998	Shakhtar Donetsk	5	(0)
1998	→ Shakhtar-2 Donetsk	19	(0)
1999–2001	Anzhi Makhachkala	93	(0)
2002–2003	Olympique Alès	25	(1)
2003	Tom Tomsk	20	(0)
2004	Moscow	16	(0)
2005	Tom Tomsk	26	(0)
2006	Aktobe	21	(0)

International career
1994–2005	Belarus	31	(0)

Managerial career
- 2008–2013: Dinamo Minsk (youth)
- 2013–2014: Dinamo Minsk (reserves)
- 2015: Bereza-2010
- 2019–2020: Arsenal Dzerzhinsk
- 2021–2024: Volna Pinsk
- * Club domestic league appearances and goals

Syarhey Yaskovich (Belarusian: Сяргей Ясковіч; Russian: Серге́й Иванович Яскович; born 14 January 1972) is a Belarusian professional football coach and former player. His son Denis Yaskovich is also a professional footballer.

== Honours ==
Dinamo Minsk

- Belarusian Premier League: 1994–95, 1995, 1997
