= Yevgeny Lovchev (footballer) =

Kazakhstani footballer

Personal information
- Full name: Yevgeny Yevgenyevich Lovchev
- Date of birth: 6 August 1975 (age 51)
- Place of birth: Moscow, Russian SFSR
- Height: 1.77 m (5 ft 9 1/2 in)
- Position: Midfielder

Youth career
- FShM Moscow

Senior career*
Years	Team	Apps	(Gls)
1994–1995	TRASKO Moscow	83	(14)
1996	Lokomotiv Moscow	1	(0)
1996	→ Lokomotiv-d Moscow	18	(6)
1997–1998	Slavia Mozyr	30	(5)
1998	Lokomotiv Saint Petersburg	15	(1)
1999	Torpedo-ZIL Moscow	17	(1)
2000	Nika Moscow		
2001–2003	Zhenis Astana	91	(13)
2004–2005	Kairat	57	(4)
2006	Tobol	16	(0)
2007–2008	Shakhter Karagandy	53	(3)
2009	Prialit Reutov		

International career
2003–2004	Kazakhstan	8	(1)
- * Club domestic league appearances and goals

Yevgeny Yevgenyevich Lovchev (Russian: Евгений Евгеньевич Ловчев; born 6 August 1975) is a retired Russian-born Kazakhstani football midfielder.

His father Evgeny Lovchev also was a professional footballer.

== Career statistics ==
=== International ===
Appearances and goals by national team and year
National team	Year	Apps	Goals
Kazakhstan	2003	5	1
Kazakhstan	2004	3	0
Total		8	1

Scores and results list Kazakhstan's goal tally first, score column indicates score after each Lovchev goal.

List of international goals scored by Yevgeny Lovchev
No.	Date	Venue	Opponent	Score	Result	Competition
1	29 April 2003	Tórsvøllur, Tórshavn, Faroe Islands	Faroe Islands	1–0	1–2	Friendly
