= Rolandas Džiaukštas =

Lithuanian footballer

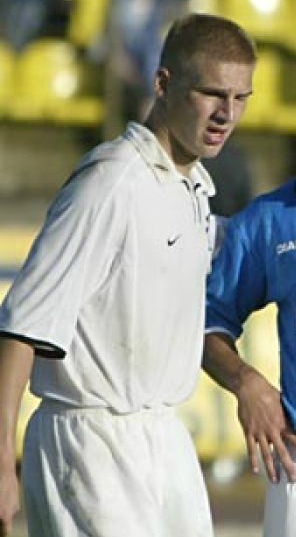

Personal information
- Date of birth: 1 April 1978 (age 48)
- Height: 1.86 m (6 ft 1 in)
- Position: Defender

Youth career
- Alsa Vilnius

Senior career*
| Years | Team | Apps | (Gls) |
| 1995–1996 | Alsa Vilnius | 13 | (0) |
| 1996–1997 | Žalgiris-Volmeta Vilnius | 26 | (0) |
| 1997–1998 | Geležinis Vilkas | 29 | (1) |
| 1998–1999 | Žalgiris | 12 | (0) |
| 1999–2000 | Baltika Kaliningrad | 69 | (3) |
| 2001–2003 | Saturn Moscow Oblast | 51 | (0) |
| 2003–2005 | FC Moscow | 37 | (0) |
| 2005–2007 | Saturn Moscow Oblast | 28 | (0) |
| 2008 | Žalgiris | 5 | (0) |
| Total | | 270 | (4) |

International career
| 1998–2007 | Lithuania | 40 | (0) |

Managerial career
- 2021: Lithuania U17
- 2025–2026: Žalgiris
- * Club domestic league appearances and goals

Rolandas Džiaukštas (born 1 April 1978) is a Lithuanian professional football manager and former player.

== International career ==
Džiaukštas made 40 appearances for the Lithuania national team from 1998 to 2007.

== Personal ==
He stands 1.86 m tall and weighs 80 kg.
