= Denis Matiola =

Russian footballer (born 1978)

Personal information
- Full name: Denis Nikolayevich Matiola
- Date of birth: 25 October 1978 (age 48)
- Place of birth: Kandalaksha, Russian SFSR
- Height: 1.83 m (6 ft 0 in)
- Position: Defender

Youth career
- FC Rotor Volgograd

Senior career*
Years	Team	Apps	(Gls)
1996–2000	FC Rotor-2 Volgograd	84	(0)
1999–2001	FC Rotor Volgograd	40	(0)
2001	FC KAMAZ Naberezhnye Chelny	20	(0)
2002	FC Rotor Volgograd	0	(0)
2002	FC Volgar-Gazprom Astrakhan	32	(0)
2003–2006	FC Kuban Krasnodar	89	(1)
2007–2009	FC Baltika Kaliningrad	63	(1)
2010	FC Gazovik Orenburg	11	(1)
2010	FC Dynamo Saint Petersburg	6	(0)
2011–2012	FC Sever Murmansk	11	(0)

International career
1999	Russia U-21	2	(0)
- * Club domestic league appearances and goals

Denis Nikolayevich Matiola (Russian: Денис Николаевич Матьола; born 25 October 1978) is a Russian former professional footballer.

== Club career ==
He made his debut in the Russian Premier League in 1999 for FC Rotor Volgograd and played one game for them in the UEFA Cup 1997–98.
