= German Lovchev =

Russian footballer (born 1981)

Personal information
- Full name: German Aleksandrovich Lovchev
- Date of birth: 10 June 1981 (age 45)
- Place of birth: Velikiye Luki, Pskov Oblast, Russian SFSR
- Height: 1.85 m (6 ft 1 in)
- Position: Forward

Senior career*
| Years | Team | Apps | (Gls) |
| 1998–1999 | FC Energiya Velikiye Luki | 38 | (2) |
| 2000–2001 | FC Spartak Moscow | 6 | (0) |
| 2002–2004 | FC Uralan Elista | 18 | (0) |
| 2004 | FC Moscow | 0 | (0) |
| 2005 | FC Luki-SKIF Velikiye Luki | | |
| 2005 | FC Avangard Kursk | 9 | (2) |
| 2006 | FK Vėtra | 23 | (2) |
| 2007 | Rakuunat | | |
| 2008 | FC Dolgiye Prudy Dolgoprudny | | |
- * Club domestic league appearances and goals

German Aleksandrovich Lovchev (Russian: Герман Александрович Ловчев; born 10 June 1981) is a Russian former professional footballer who played as a forward.

He made his professional debut in the Russian Second Division in 1998 for FC Energiya Velikiye Luki. He played one game in the UEFA Champions League 2001–02 for FC Spartak Moscow.

== Honours ==
- Russian Premier League: 2000, 2001
- A Lyga third place: 2006
