= Evgeny Lovchev =

Russian footballer (born 1949)

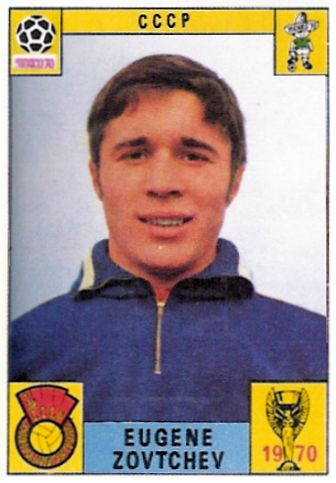
- Lovchev in 1970

Personal information
- Full name: Evgeny Serafimovich Lovchev
- Date of birth: 29 January 1949 (age 77)
- Place of birth: Kryukovo, Russian SFSR, Soviet Union
- Height: 1.72 m (5 ft 8 in)
- Position: Left back

Youth career
- Burevestnik Moscow

Senior career*
Years	Team	Apps	(Gls)
1969–1978	FC Spartak Moscow	249	(30)
1979–1980	FC Dynamo Moscow	19	(0)
1980	FC Krylia Sovetov Kuybyshev	22	(13)
1981–1983	FC Metallurg Zlatoust (amateur)		

International career
1969–1977	USSR	52	(1)

Managerial career
- 1980: FC Krylia Sovetov Kuybyshev (assistant)
- 1981–1983: FC Metallurg Zlatoust
- 1986: FC Lokomotiv Chelyabinsk
- 1989: FC Druzhba Maykop
- 1996–2008: Spartak Moscow (futsal)
- 2001–2003: Russia (futsal)
Medal record
Representing Soviet Union
Men's Football
Bronze medal – third place	1972 Munich	Team competition
- * Club domestic league appearances and goals

Evgeny Serafimovich Lovchev (Russian: Евгений Серафимович Ловчев; born 29 January 1949) is a Russian sports journalist, a former footballer, and a football and futsal manager.

== Honours ==
- Soviet Top League winner: 1969
- Soviet Top League runner-up: 1974
- Soviet Top League bronze: 1970
- Soviet Cup winner: 1971
- Top 33 players year-end list: 7 times
- Soviet Footballer of the Year: 1972

== Career ==
He was capped 52 times for USSR, playing the 1970 FIFA World Cup and the 1972 Summer Olympics. In 1970, he became the first player to be booked on a World Cup match, in the opening game of the tournament against Mexico.

== Personal ==
His son Evgeniy Lovchev played football professionally, including Kazakhstan national football team.
