= Munever Rizvić =

Bosnian footballer and manager

Personal information
- Date of birth: November 4, 1973 (age 52)
- Place of birth: Tuzla, Bosnia and Herzegovina
- Height: 1.80 m (5 ft 11 in)
- Position: Defender

Team information
- Current team: Budućnost Banovići

Senior career*
Years	Team	Apps	(Gls)
1991–1997	Budućnost Banovići		
1997–2000	Olimpik		
2000–2001	Budućnost Banovići	29	(0)
2001–2004	Moscow	92	(1)
2005	Budućnost Banovići	22	(0)
2006	Aktobe	2	(0)

International career
1999–2002	Bosnia and Herzegovina	8	(0)
2001	Bosnia and Herzegovina XI	2	(0)

Managerial career
- 2008–2011: Budućnost Banovići
- 2012–2020: Budućnost Banovići
- * Club domestic league appearances and goals

Munever Rizvić (born November 4, 1973) is a Bosnian professional football manager and former player who was most recently the manager of First League of FBiH club Budućnost Banovići, a position he was at from September 2012 until January 2020.

== International career ==
He made his debut for Bosnia and Herzegovina in a January 1999 friendly match away against Malta and has earned a total of 10 caps (2 unofficial), scoring no goals. His final international was a September 2002 European Championship qualification match against Romania.

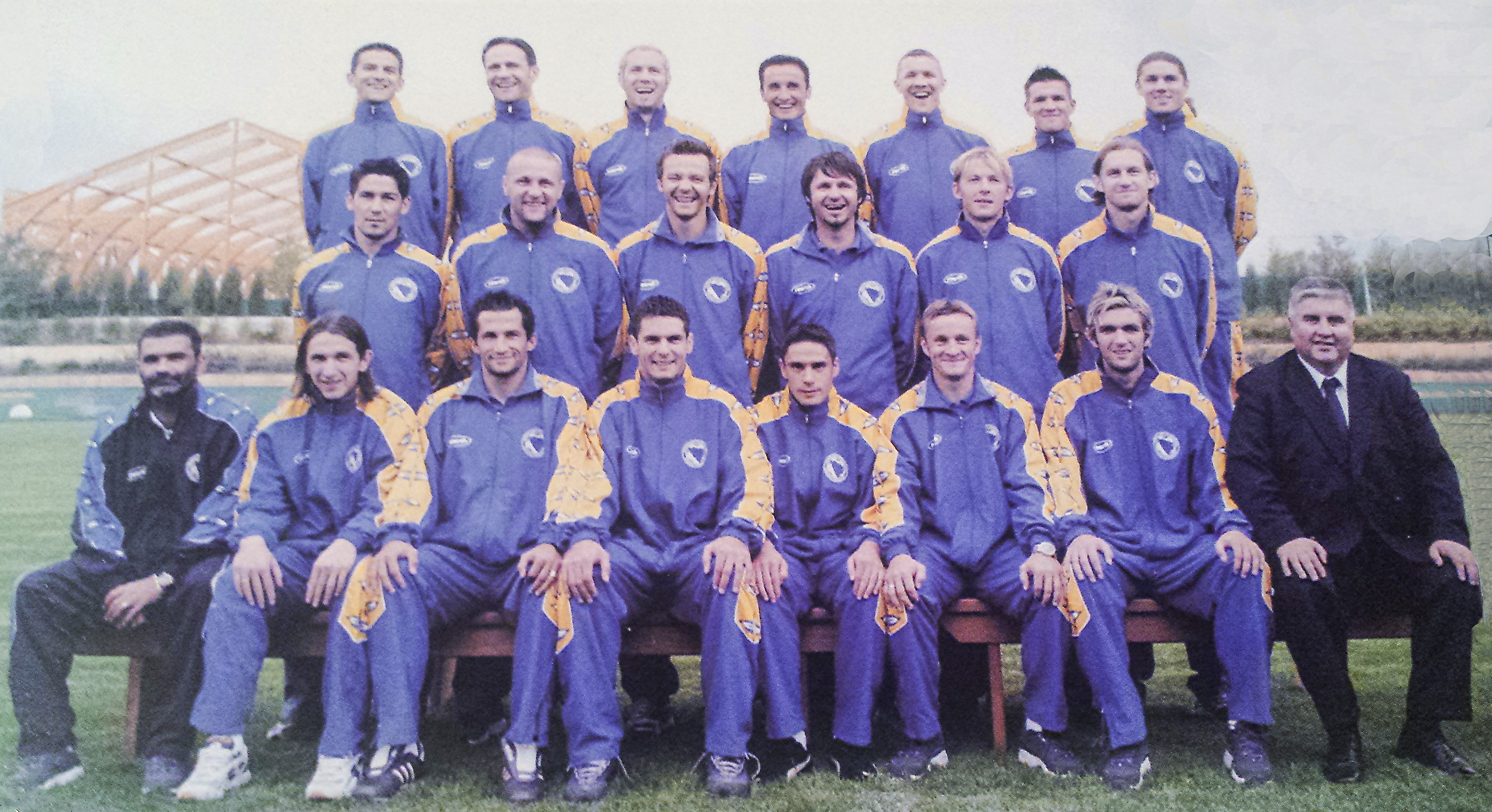
Bosnia and Herzegovina squad during UEFA Euro 2004 qualifying.

== Managerial statistics ==
As of 16 November 2019

Managerial record by team and tenure
Team	From	To	Record				
Team	From	To	G	W	D	L	Win %
Budućnost Banovići	June 2008	July 2011	89	42	10	37	47.19
Budućnost Banovići	September 2012	January 2020	216	98	43	75	45.37
Total			305	140	53	112	45.90

== Honours ==
=== Player ===
Olimpik

- Second League of FBiH - South: 1999–00

=== Manager ===
Budućnost Banovići

- First League of FBiH: 2009–10
- Second League of FBiH - North: 2017–18, 2018–19
