= Baba Adamu =

Ghanaian professional footballer (born 1979)

Personal information
- Full name: Baba Armando Adamu
- Date of birth: 20 October 1979 (age 47)
- Place of birth: Kumasi, Ghana
- Height: 1.87 m (6 ft 2 in)
- Position: Striker

Senior career*
Years	Team	Apps	(Gls)
1997	All Blacks F.C.		
1998	Al-Shabab (Dubai)		
1998	Asante Kotoko		(0)
1998–2000	Al-Shabab (Dubai)		
2001	Chernomorets Novorossiysk	6	(0)
2001–2002	Rostselmash Rostov-on-Don	16	(5)
2002	Lokomotiv Moscow	8	(1)
2003	Dinamo Minsk	13	(6)
2003–2004	Al-Nasr		(0)
2004–2005	FC Moscow	19	(2)
2005–2006	Krylia Sovetov Samara	18	(4)
2006–2007	Sakaryaspor	7	(1)
2007–2008	Asante Kotoko		(0)
2007–2008	→ Al-Hilal (loan)		(0)
2008–2011	King Faisal Babes		
2011–2012	Berekum Chelsea		

International career
1999–2006	Ghana	9	(2)
- * Club domestic league appearances and goals

Baba Armando Adamu (born 20 October 1979), known occasionally simply by his nickname Armando, is a Ghanaian former professional footballer who played as a striker. He made nine appearances for scoring twice the Ghana national team.

== International career ==
Baba made his international debut for Ghana against Jamaica on 7 August 1999. He scored for Ghana on his debut. He currently has 8 caps, the last of which was in a 1–0 defeat against Mexico on 1 March 2006 in a Pre-2006 FIFA World Cup International friendly in Frisco, Texas, US. In these 8 appearances, he has scored a total of 2 goals.

Baba was a member of the Ghana squad that played in the 2006 African Cup of Nations. He was however not selected into the Ghana squad that played in the 2006 FIFA World Cup, even after impressing during the African Cup Tournament.

He scored against Zimbabwe during the 2006 African Cup of Nations in Egypt.

Baba was selected as part of the provisional 28-man squad for the World Cup, but was controversially left out of the final 23-man Squad because of indiscipline, a trait that many believe caused him to have an inconsistent Club and International career.

Adamu was never likely to get much playing time for Ghana with the likes of Matthew Amoah, Joetex Frimpong and Prince Tagoe ahead of him in the pecking order for the striking berths. He did, however, make an appearance at the start of the second half against Zimbabwe and scored Ghana's consolation goal in a 2–1 loss.
