= Amir Karić =

Slovenian footballer

Personal information
- Date of birth: 31 December 1973 (age 52)
- Place of birth: Orahovica Donja, SFR Yugoslavia
- Height: 1.80 m (5 ft 11 in)
- Positions: Left-back; midfielder

Youth career
- –1989: Šoštanj
- 1989–1991: Rudar Velenje

Senior career*
Years	Team	Apps	(Gls)
1991–1993	Rudar Velenje	60	(17)
1993–1997	Maribor	95	(12)
1997–1998	Gamba Osaka	12	(0)
1998	Železničar Maribor	3	(2)
1999–2000	Maribor	43	(6)
2000–2002	Ipswich Town	0	(0)
2001	→ Crystal Palace (loan)	3	(0)
2002–2003	Maribor	42	(9)
2004	Moscow	4	(0)
2004–2005	Mura	9	(3)
2005–2006	AEL Limassol	11	(1)
2005–2006	Koper	14	(1)
2006–2007	Anorthosis Famagusta	2	(0)
2006–2007	Interblock	8	(1)
2007–2009	Olimpija Ljubljana	42	(17)
2009–2011	Koper	54	(3)
2012	Železničar Maribor	20	(8)
2013	Malečnik	11	(4)
2013–2018	USV Murfeld Süd	94	(39)
2018–2022	Malečnik	59	(12)

International career
1992–1995	Slovenia U21	14	(4)
1996–2004	Slovenia	64	(1)
2003	Slovenia B	2	(0)

Managerial career
- 2022–2023: Pomurje / Mura
- * Club domestic league appearances and goals

Amir Karić (born 31 December 1973) is a Slovenian football coach and former player. Primarily a left-back, he also played as a midfielder.

== Club career ==
After his impressive performances at the 2000 European Championships, Karić was brought to English football by Ipswich Town in August 2000 for £700,000.

His appearances for Ipswich were limited to three in the League Cup before he was sent out on loan to Crystal Palace in March 2001, where he only played three matches. His loan spell at Palace was then cut short and the player returned to Ipswich. Karić's contract at Ipswich was terminated by mutual consent in October 2002.

After that, he played for Moscow. In 2005–06 he played for the Cypriot team Anorthosis. During his career he also played for Rudar Velenje, AEL Limassol, Gamba Osaka and for Koper.

== International career ==
Karić made his debut for Slovenia in a May 1996 friendly match against the United Arab Emirates, where he also scored his first and only goal for the national team. In his international career from 1996 to 2004, he made 64 appearances for the national team.

With Slovenia, he played at the 2000 UEFA European Championship and at the 2002 FIFA World Cup.

== Personal life ==
His son Sven and daughter Tija are also footballers.

== Career statistics ==
=== Club ===
Appearances and goals by club, season and competition
Club performance			League		National cup		League cup		Total	
Season	Club	League	Apps	Goals	Apps	Goals	Apps	Goals	Apps	Goals
Slovenia			League		Slovenian Cup		League cup		Total	
1991–92	Rudar Velenje	1. SNL	33	7			—		33	7
1992–93	Rudar Velenje	1. SNL	27	10			—		27	10
1993–94	Maribor	1. SNL	20	0	4	1	—		24	1
1994–95	Maribor	1. SNL	28	2	4	0	—		32	2
1995–96	Maribor	1. SNL	21	4	1	0	—		22	4
1996–97	Maribor	1. SNL	26	6	7	3	—		33	9
Japan			League		Emperor's Cup		J.League Cup		Total	
1997	Gamba Osaka	J1 League	5	0	2	0	0	0	7	0
1998	Gamba Osaka	J1 League	7	0	0	0	3	1	10	1
Slovenia			League		Slovenian Cup		League cup		Total	
1998–99	Železničar Maribor	2. SNL	3	2	0	0	—		3	2
1998–99	Maribor	1. SNL	15	3	4	0			19	3
1999–2000	Maribor	1. SNL	25	3	4	1	—		29	4
2000–01	Maribor	1. SNL	3	0	0	0	—		3	0
England			League		FA Cup		EFL Cup		Total	
2000–01	Ipswich Town	Premier League	0	0	0	0	3	0	3	0
2000–01	Crystal Palace	First Division	3	0	0	0	0	0	3	0
Slovenia			League		Slovenian Cup		League cup		Total	
2001–02	Maribor	1. SNL	12	1	2	0	—		14	1
2002–03	Maribor	1. SNL	14	4	0	0	—		14	4
2003–04	Maribor	1. SNL	16	4	3	1	—		19	5
Russia			League		Russian Cup		Premier League Cup		Total	
2004	Moscow	Premier League	4	0					4	0
Slovenia			League		Slovenian Cup		League cup		Total	
2004–05	Mura	1. SNL	9	3	0	0	—		9	3
Cyprus			League		Cypriot Cup		League cup		Total	
2005–06	AEL Lemesos	First Division	11	1			—		11	1
Slovenia			League		Slovenian Cup		League cup		Total	
2005–06	Koper	1. SNL	14	1	3	0	—		17	1
Cyprus			League		Cypriot Cup		League cup		Total	
2006–07	Anorthosis Famagusta	First Division	2	0			—		2	0
Slovenia			League		Slovenian Cup		League cup		Total	
2006–07	Interblock	1. SNL	8	1	0	0	—		8	1
2007–08	Olimpija	3. SNL	20	12	4	1	—		24	13
2008–09	Olimpija	2. SNL	22	5	1	0	—		23	5
2009–10	Koper	1. SNL	30	0	2	0	—		32	0
2010–11	Koper	1. SNL	19	3	4	0	—		23	3
2011–12	Koper	1. SNL	5	0	0	0	—		5	0
2011–12	Železničar Maribor	1. MNZ Maribor	12	2	0	0	—		12	2
2012–13	Železničar Maribor	1. MNZ Maribor	8	6	0	0	—		8	6
2012–13	Malečnik	3. SNL	11	4	0	0	—		11	4
Total			433	84	45	7	6	1	484	92

=== International ===
Appearances and goals by national team and year
National team	Year	Apps	Goals
Slovenia	Year	Apps	Goals
Slovenia	1996	3	1
Slovenia	1997	5	0
Slovenia	1998	3	0
Slovenia	1999	9	0
Slovenia	2000	11	0
Slovenia	2001	7	0
Slovenia	2002	11	0
Slovenia	2003	8	0
Slovenia	2004	7	0
Total		64	1
