= Andrey Astrowski =

Belarusian footballer

Andrey Astrowski Андрэй Астроўскі
Personal information
- Full name: Andrey Mikalayavich Astrowski
- Date of birth: 13 September 1973 (age 53)
- Place of birth: Pinsk, Belarusian SSR, USSR
- Height: 1.85 m (6 ft 1 in)
- Position: Defender

Team information
- Current team: Volna Pinsk (assistant coach)

Youth career
- 1983–1990: SDYuShOR Pinsk

Senior career*
Years	Team	Apps	(Gls)
1990–1993	Dinamo Brest	55	(1)
1993–1996	Dinamo Minsk	95	(10)
1997–2000	Dynamo Moscow	88	(7)
2000–2002	Maccabi Haifa	54	(1)
2002–2003	Arsenal Kyiv	39	(3)
2004	Moscow	11	(0)
2004–2005	Arsenal Kyiv	16	(0)
2005–2007	Chornomorets Odesa	23	(0)

International career
1992–1995	Belarus U21	13	(0)
1994–2005	Belarus	52	(1)

Managerial career
- 2009–2010: Volna Pinsk
- 2021–: Volna Pinsk (assistant)
- * Club domestic league appearances and goals

Andrey Mikalayavich Astrowski (Belarusian: Андрэй Мікалаявіч Астроўскі, Russian: Андрей Николаевич Островский, Andrei Nikolayevich Ostrovskiy; born 13 September 1973) is a Belarusian football coach and a former player. He is an assistant manager of Volna Pinsk.

Astrowski made 52 appearances for the Belarus national football team from 1994 to 2005.

== Honours ==
Dinamo Minsk

- Belarusian Premier League champion: 1992–93, 1993–94, 1994–95, 1995
- Belarusian Cup winner: 1993–94

Maccabi Haifa

- Israeli Premier League champion: 2000–01, 2001–02
