= Andrey Movsisyan =

Armenian footballer (born 1975)

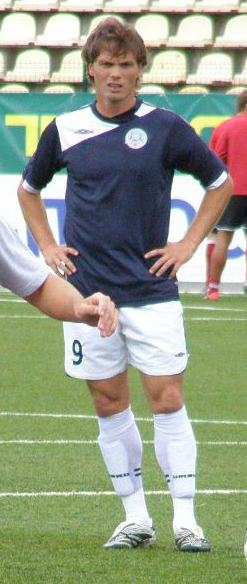
- Movsisyan with Avangard Podolsk

Personal information
- Date of birth: 27 October 1975 (age 50)
- Place of birth: Moscow, Soviet Union
- Height: 1.82 m (6 ft 0 in)
- Position: Forward

Senior career*
Years	Team	Apps	(Gls)
1992–1996	Spartak-d Moscow	127	(63)
1996–1997	CSKA Moscow	24	(3)
1996–1997	CSKA-d Moscow	23	(7)
1998	Lokomotiv Nizhniy Novgorod	8	(0)
1998–1999	Sportakademklub Moscow	56	(29)
2000	Saturn-2 Ramenskoye	3	(1)
2000–2002	Saturn Ramenskoye	76	(15)
2003–2005	FC Moscow	33	(2)
2006	Luch-Energiya Vladivostok	1	(0)
2007	Terek Grozny	10	(1)
2008	Sportakademklub Moscow	5	(0)
2009–2010	Avangard Podolsk	30	(5)
Total		396	(126)

International career
1996	Russia U21	1	(0)
2000–2005	Armenia	18	(2)
- * Club domestic league appearances and goals

Andrey Movsisyan (Armenian: Անդրեյ Մովսիսյան; born on 27 October 1975) is an Armenian former professional footballer who played as a forward. He was a member of the Armenia national team, participating in 18 international matches and scoring 2 goal, having previously made one appearance for the Russia U21.

== International career ==
Movsisyan made his debut for the Armenia national team in friendly away against Lithuania on 3 June 2000.

== Career statistics ==
Armenia national team
Year	Apps	Goals
2000	4	1
2001	4	1
2002	2	0
2003	3	0
2004	4	0
2005	1	0
Total	18	2

Statistics accurate as of match played 13 November 2016

As of 9 November 2016

#	Date	Venue	Opponent	Score	Result	Competition	Ref
1.	3 June 2000	Lithuania	Lithuania	2–1	2–1	Friendly	
2.	24 March 2001	Hanrapetakan Marzadasht, Yerevan, Armenia	Wales	2–2	2–2	2002 WCQ	

== Honours ==
- Russian Third League Zone 3 top scorer: 1994 (30 goals).
