= Jerry-Christian Tchuissé =

Cameroonian footballer (born 1975)

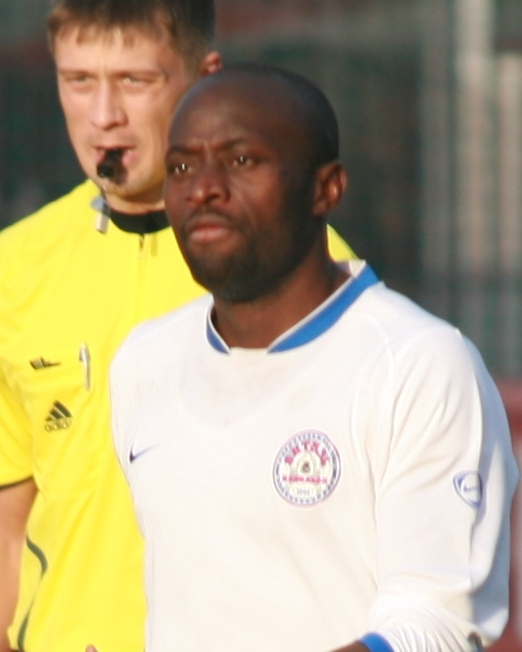

Personal information
- Date of birth: 13 January 1975 (age 51)
- Place of birth: Douala, Cameroon
- Height: 1.78 m (5 ft 10 in)
- Position: Defender

Senior career*
Years	Team	Apps	(Gls)
1993–1994	Bongongui Douala	?	(?)
1996–1997	Léopards Douala	?	(?)
1998–2000	FC Chernomorets Novorossiysk	39	(0)
2000–2003	FC Spartak Moscow	63	(0)
2003	FC Chernomorets Novorossiysk	26	(0)
2004–2006	FC Moscow	67	(2)
2007	FC Terek Grozny	38	(0)
2008	FC Vityaz Podolsk	15	(0)

International career
2001–2005	Cameroon	5	(0)
- * Club domestic league appearances and goals

Jerry-Christian Tchuissé (Russian: Жерри-Кристиан Тчуйсе; born 13 January 1975) is a Cameroonian former professional footballer who played as a fullback. He played club football in Russia for Chernomorets Novorossiysk, Spartak Moscow, FC Moscow, FC Terek Grozny and FC Vityaz Podolsk.

== Club career ==
In 1997, after playing some amateur football in Cameroon, Tchuisse moved to Russia. After unsuccessfully trying to get into a university in Krasnodar, Tchuisse was spotted by the coach of an amateur side "Neftyannik", from the nearby Goryachy Klyuch, while playing football with his friends. Less than half a year later, his impressive displays for the Krasnodar Krai team, at an exhibition event, earned him his first professional contract and a move to the Russian Top Division (as it was known at the time) side Chernomorets Novorossiysk.

During his time at Novorossiysk, Tchuisse received a career-threatening injury, after a bad challenge by Valery Kechinov. Tchuisse recovered and soon signed for the league champions Spartak Moscow.

With Spartak, the Cameroonian won two domestic league titles. In 2000, Tchuisse made his European debut in the UEFA Champions League and He was granted Russian citizenship in this year by Vladimir Putin and was considered for the Russian national team. The fans saw him as a potential counterpart to Nigerian international Emmanuel Olisadebe.Even a number 21 jersey was prepared especially for Tchuise, which was going to be given to him before the Spartak-CSKA match on 31 March 2001. However, he never played in it. On 6 May 2001 he made his debut for the Cameroon national team, where he was also called up. Tense relations with his teammates, however, forced the player to look for a move away. Tchuisse was linked with a possible move to RC Lensor Shaktar Donetsk, but no deal ever materialized and the player, eventually, returned to Chernomorets Novorossiysk. After the club's relegation to the Russian First Division, Tchuisse received an offer from the newly formed ambitious FC Moscow.

During this three-year spell at the Moscow club, Tchuisse scored his first professional goal. His two goals for FC Moscow still remain his only goals scored for a professional club.

In 2007 and 2008, he played for FC Terek Grozny and FC Vityaz Podolsk respectively.

Tchuissé currently resides in Le Mans, France. There he coaches a local team, Le Mans villaret, and has business in Cameroon.

== International career and trophies ==
Tchuissé obtained Russian citizenship in 2000 after meeting with Vladimir Putin and was a candidate to play for the Russia national team. He even participated in team training. However, he has not played for Russia and debuted for Cameroon on 6 May 2001.

He won during his career two championship of Russia 2000, 2001 and a cup of Russia 2003.
