= Pyotr Bystrov =

Russian footballer (born 1979)

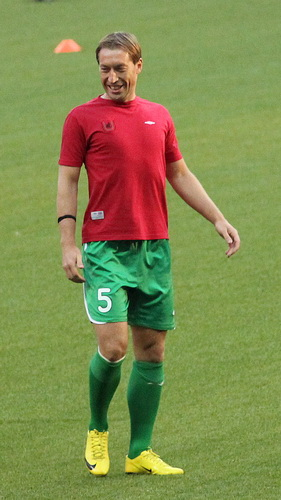

Personal information
- Full name: Pyotr Aleksandrovich Bystrov
- Date of birth: 15 July 1979 (age 47)
- Place of birth: Gorky, Soviet Union
- Height: 1.78 m (5 ft 10 in)
- Position: Midfielder

Youth career
- FC Lokomotiv Nizhny Novgorod

Senior career*
Years	Team	Apps	(Gls)
1996–1997	FC Lokomotiv-d Nizhny Novgorod	30	(5)
1997–2000	FC Lokomotiv Nizhny Novgorod	64	(2)
2000–2001	FC Dynamo Moscow	36	(6)
2002–2005	FC Saturn Ramenskoye	91	(13)
2006–2008	FC Moscow	70	(7)
2009–2012	FC Rubin Kazan	50	(0)

International career
1999–2001	Russia U-21	10	(5)
2003	Russia	2	(0)
- * Club domestic league appearances and goals

Pyotr Aleksandrovich Bystrov (Russian: Пётр Александрович Быстров, born 15 July 1979) is a former Russian association footballer. He usually played as a central, left-sided or offensive midfielder. He has played for Russia. He grew up in St Petersburg with his mother, a ballet dancer. Though his father, a law professor, never married Elena, they both carry his surname. In 2007, Bystrov passed his law exams and wished to pursue a career as a sports lawyer working for the IOC.

== Career statistics ==
As of 2 September 2010

Club	Div	Season	League		Cup		Europe		Total	
Club	Div	Season	Apps	Goals	Apps	Goals	Apps	Goals	Apps	Goals
Lokomotiv-d N.N.	D4	1996	20	4	—		—		20	4
Lokomotiv-d N.N.	D4	1997	10	1	—		—		10	1
Lokomotiv-d N.N.	Total		30	5	0	0	0	0	30	5
Lokomotiv N.N.	D1	1997	19	0	1	0	4	1	24	1
Lokomotiv N.N.	D2	1998	16	1	1	0	—		17	1
Lokomotiv N.N.	D1	1999	18	1	—		—		18	1
Lokomotiv N.N.	D1	2000	12	0	—		—		12	1
Lokomotiv N.N.	Total		65	2	2	0	4	1	71	3
Dynamo Moscow	D1	2000	12	2	2	0	2	0	16	2
Dynamo Moscow	D1	2001	24	4	2	0	4	0	30	4
Dynamo Moscow	Total		36	6	4	0	6	0	46	6
Saturn Ramenskoye	D1	2002	12	1	2	1	—		14	2
Saturn Ramenskoye	D1	2003	28	4	6	1	—		34	5
Saturn Ramenskoye	D1	2004	25	8	—		—		25	8
Saturn Ramenskoye	D1	2005	26	0	6	1	—		32	1
Saturn Ramenskoye	Total		91	13	14	3	0	0	105	16
FC Moscow	D1	2006	26	2	3	1	4	1	14	2
FC Moscow	D1	2007	25	4	6	1	—		30	1
FC Moscow	D1	2008	19	1	2	0	4	0	30	1
FC Moscow	Total		70	7	11	2	8	1	89	10
Rubin Kazan	D1	2009	11	0	3	0	2	0	16	0
Rubin Kazan	D1	2010	18	0	—		0	0	14	0
Rubin Kazan	Total		29	0	3	0	2	0	34	0
Career total			317	28	34	5	20	2	371	35
