= Oleg Kuzmin =

Russian footballer

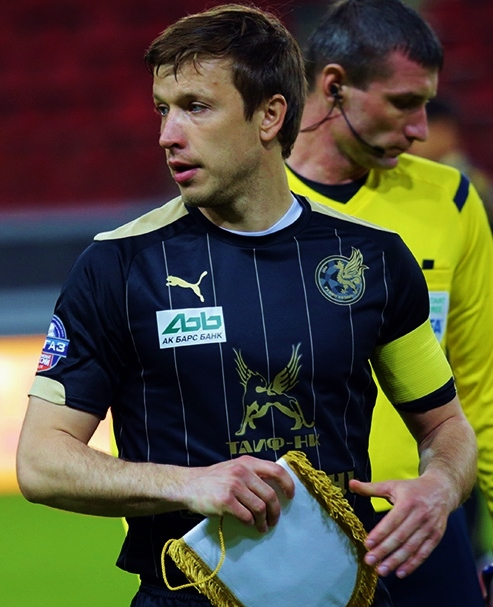
- Kuzmin with Rubin Kazan in 2015

Personal information
- Full name: Oleg Aleksandrovich Kuzmin
- Date of birth: 9 May 1981 (age 45)
- Place of birth: Moscow, Soviet Union
- Height: 1.75 m (5 ft 9 in)
- Position: Defender

Team information
- Current team: Rubin Kazan (caretaker manager)

Youth career
- Spartak Moscow

Senior career*
Years	Team	Apps	(Gls)
1997	Spartak-d Moscow	12	(0)
1998–2000	Spartak-2 Moscow	64	(1)
2000	Spartak Moscow	1	(0)
2001–2004	Uralan Elista	80	(3)
2003	→ Chernomorets Novorossiysk (loan)	7	(0)
2004–2008	Moscow	115	(6)
2009–2010	Lokomotiv Moscow	34	(2)
2010–2018	Rubin Kazan	157	(5)

International career
2000–2003	Russia U-21	26	(1)
2015–2016	Russia	5	(1)

Managerial career
- 2019–2026: Rubin Kazan (assistant)
- 2026–: Rubin Kazan (caretaker)
- * Club domestic league appearances and goals

Oleg Aleksandrovich Kuzmin (Russian: Олег Александрович Кузьмин, born 9 May 1981) is a Russian football coach and a former player who is the caretaker manager of Rubin Kazan. He played as a right back.

== International career ==
In October 2009, he was called up to the Russia national football team for the 2010 FIFA World Cup qualifier against Azerbaijan. He was called up again in August 2015 for the UEFA Euro 2016 qualifiers against Sweden and against Liechtenstein. He made his national team debut, at the age of 34, in the game against Sweden on 5 September 2015. He scored his first goal for the Russia national football team on 12 October 2015 in a game against Montenegro

== Coaching career ==
On 26 October 2026, Kuzmin was appointed caretaker manager by Rubin Kazan.

== Career statistics ==
As of 13 May 2018

Club	Season	League			Cup		Continental		Other		Total	
Club	Season	Division	Apps	Goals	Apps	Goals	Apps	Goals	Apps	Goals	Apps	Goals
FC Spartak Moscow	1997	Russian Premier League	0	0	0	0	0	0	–		0	0
FC Spartak Moscow	1998	Russian Premier League	0	0	0	0	0	0	–		0	0
FC Spartak Moscow	1999	Russian Premier League	0	0	0	0	0	0	–		0	0
FC Spartak Moscow	2000	Russian Premier League	1	0	0	0	0	0	–		1	0
FC Spartak Moscow	Total		1	0	0	0	0	0	0	0	1	0
FC Spartak-d Moscow	1997	Third League	12	0	–		–		–		12	0
FC Spartak-d Moscow	1998	Second Division	20	0	–		–		–		20	0
FC Spartak-d Moscow	1999	Second Division	20	0	–		–		–		20	0
FC Spartak-d Moscow	2000	Second Division	24	1	–		–		–		24	1
FC Spartak-d Moscow	Total		76	1	0	0	0	0	0	0	76	1
FC Uralan Elista	2001	FNL	26	2	2	0	–		–		28	2
FC Uralan Elista	2002	Russian Premier League	19	1	2	0	–		–		21	1
FC Uralan Elista	2003	Russian Premier League	16	0	0	0	–		–		16	0
FC Chernomorets Novorossiysk	2003	Russian Premier League	7	0	2	0	–		–		9	0
FC Uralan Elista	2004	FNL	19	0	2	1	–		–		21	1
FC Uralan Elista	Total (2 spells)		80	3	6	1	0	0	0	0	86	4
FC Moscow	2004	Russian Premier League	7	1	1	0	–		–		8	1
FC Moscow	2005	Russian Premier League	28	3	2	0	–		–		30	3
FC Moscow	2006	Russian Premier League	28	1	2	0	4	0	–		34	1
FC Moscow	2007	Russian Premier League	25	0	8	0	–		–		33	0
FC Moscow	2008	Russian Premier League	27	1	2	2	3	1	–		32	4
FC Moscow	Total		115	6	15	2	7	1	0	0	137	9
FC Lokomotiv Moscow	2009	Russian Premier League	24	1	1	0	–		–		25	1
FC Lokomotiv Moscow	2010	Russian Premier League	10	1	1	0	–		–		11	1
FC Lokomotiv Moscow	Total		34	2	2	0	0	0	0	0	36	2
FC Rubin Kazan	2010	Russian Premier League	13	0	0	0	2	0	–		15	0
FC Rubin Kazan	2011–12	Russian Premier League	27	0	3	0	7	0	–		37	0
FC Rubin Kazan	2012–13	Russian Premier League	26	1	0	0	11	0	1 (Note: One appearance in the Russian Super Cup)	0	38	1
FC Rubin Kazan	2013–14	Russian Premier League	27	1	0	0	10	1	–		37	2
FC Rubin Kazan	2014–15	Russian Premier League	27	0	3	0	–		–		30	0
FC Rubin Kazan	2015–16	Russian Premier League	21	2	0	0	8	1	–		29	3
FC Rubin Kazan	2016–17	Russian Premier League	5	0	0	0	–		–		5	0
FC Rubin Kazan	2017–18	Russian Premier League	11	1	1	0	–		–		12	1
FC Rubin Kazan	Total		157	5	7	0	38	2	1	0	203	7
Career total			470	17	32	3	45	3	1	0	548	23

=== International goals ===
#	Date	Venue	Opponent	Score	Result	Competition
1.	12 October 2015	Otkrytie Arena, Moscow, Russia	Montenegro	1–0	2–0	UEFA Euro 2016 Qualification

== Honours ==
=== Club ===
Rubin Kazan

- Russian Cup: 2011–12.
- Russian Super Cup: 2012.
