= Pompiliu Stoica =

Romanian association football manager and former player

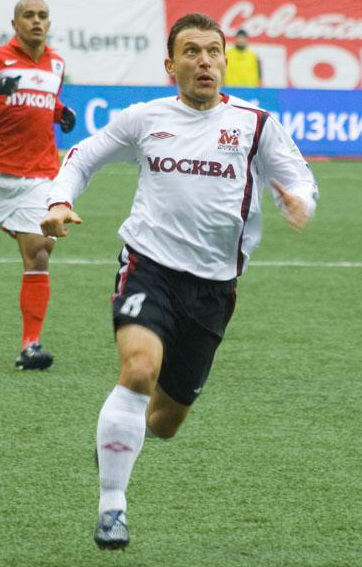
- Stoica with FC Moscow in 2007

Personal information
- Full name: Pompiliu Sorin Stoica
- Date of birth: 10 September 1976 (age 50)
- Place of birth: Buzău, Romania
- Height: 1.70 m (5 ft 7 in)
- Position: Left-back

Senior career*
Years	Team	Apps	(Gls)
1993–1998	Gloria Buzău	60	(11)
1998–2000	Astra Ploiești	75	(4)
2000–2004	Steaua București	108	(3)
2004–2008	FC Moscow	88	(0)
2008	Tom Tomsk	13	(0)
2009	Alki Larnaca	7	(0)
2009–2012	Petrolul Ploiești	61	(2)
2021–2023	Plopeni	14	(1)
Total		426	(21)

International career
2000–2006	Romania	8	(1)

Managerial career
- 2013: Viitorul Buzău
- 2018: FCSB II
- 2021–2024: Plopeni (assistant)
- 2024: Tricolorul Breaza
- * Club domestic league appearances and goals

Pompiliu Sorin Stoica (Romanian pronunciation: [ˈstojka]; born 10 September 1976) is a Romanian football manager and former player.

== Playing career ==
=== Club ===
Stoica started his senior career at hometown club Gloria Buzău, and went on to represent Astra Ploiești, Steaua București and Petrolul Ploiești in his country. He also had three stints abroad, of which two in Russia and one in Cyprus.

=== International ===
Between 2000 and 2006, Stoica earned eight caps and scored one goal for Romania at senior level.

== Managerial career ==
In 2013, Stoica was appointed manager of lower league club Viitorul Buzău.

== Personal life ==
Stoica's son, Ianis, is also a professional footballer. He followed in his father's footsteps by playing for Steaua București—now named FCSB—and Petrolul Ploiești.

== Honours ==
Astra Ploiești

- Liga II: 1997–98

Steaua București

- Liga I: 2000–01, 2004–05
- Supercupa României: 2001

FC Moscow

- Russian Cup runner-up: 2006–07

Petrolul Ploiești

- Liga II: 2010–11
