= FC Moscow =

Moscow
- Full name: Football Club Moscow
- Nicknames: The Citizens, The Caps
- Founded: 1 March 2004; 22 years ago
- Dissolved: 2010; 16 years ago
- Ground: Eduard Streltsov Stadium
- Capacity: 13,450
Home colours	Away colours

Football Club Moscow (Russian: Футбольный клуб Москва) was a Russian football club based in Moscow.

== History ==
The creation of the team was first announced by the Moscow government on 1 March 2004. FC Moscow was formed on the base of FC Torpedo-Metallurg. The team played in the Russian Cup final in 2007.

Moscow's best result in Russian Premier League was a 4th position in 2007.

On 14 December 2007, Oleg Blokhin was announced as FC Moscow's new manager with Leonid Slutsky having left at the end of the 2007 season. In February 2010 the club withdrew from the Premier League after their owner and main sponsor, MMC Norilsk Nickel, withdrew funding. Their place in the league was taken by Alania Vladikavkaz. Subsequently, FC Moscow folded, ceasing to exist as a professional football club. They played in 2010 in the fourth level of the Russian football pyramid, the Amateur Football League, and after that season the team was dissolved altogether on 28 December. Soon after the club was reestablished and continue to compete in the Amateur Football League.

During the professional period, E. Streltsov Stadium, in Moscow was used as home ground.

=== Domestic history ===
Season	Div.	Pos.	Pl.	W	D	L	GS	GA	P	Domestic Cup	Europe		Top scorer (league)	Head coach
2004	1st	9	30	10	10	10	38	39	40	Round of 32			(Argentina) Bracamonte – 11	(Russia) Petrakov
2005	1st	5	30	14	8	8	36	26	50	Round of 16			(Russia) Kirichenko – 14	(Russia) Petrakov (Russia) Slutsky
2006	1st	6	30	10	13	7	41	37	43	Round of 16	IC	3rd round	(Russia) Kirichenko – 12	(Russia) Slutsky
2007	1st	4	30	15	7	8	40	32	52	Runner-up			(Russia) Adamov – 14	(Russia) Slutsky
2008	1st	9	30	9	11	10	34	36	38	Quarterfinals			(Argentina) Bracamonte – 8	(Ukraine) Blokhin
2009	1st	6	30	13	9	8	39	28	48	Semifinals	UC	1st round	(Slovakia) Jakubko – 8	(Montenegro) Božović
2010	4th, Zone Moscow, Division A	3	28	21	1	6	75	28	64				(Russia) Agaptsev – 21	(Russia) Vasilyev
2017	4th, Zone Moscow	11	16	4	5	7	43	52	17				(Russia) Skopin – 5	(Russia) Zvezdin

=== European history ===
FC Moscow in its first appearance on the European arena reached the third round of 2006 Intertoto Cup and was eliminated by Hertha BSC Berlin. FC Moscow made their second appearance in Europe in the 2008–09 UEFA Cup, beating Legia Warsaw in the qualifying round.

As of match played 11 March 2020

Competition	Pld	W	D	L	GF	GA
UEFA Intertoto Cup	4	2	1	1	3	2
UEFA Cup	4	2	1	1	6	4
Total	8	4	2	2	9	6

Season	Competition	Round	Club	Home	Away	Aggregate
2006	UEFA Intertoto Cup	Second round	(Belarus) MTZ-RIPO Minsk	2–0	1–0	3–0
2006	UEFA Intertoto Cup	Third round	(Germany) Hertha BSC	0–0	0–2	0–2
2008–09	UEFA Cup	Second round	(Poland) Legia Warsaw	2–0	2–1	4–1
2008–09	UEFA Cup	Third round	(Denmark) Copenhagen	1–2	1–1	2–3

== Nicknames ==
Fans and journalists called FC Moskva The Citizens (Russian: Горожане). The colloquial nickname for the club is The Caps (Russian: Кепки), which refers to Moscow government ownership (former Moscow mayor Yuriy Luzhkov usually wears a cap).

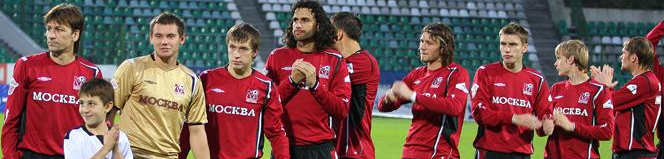
FC Moscow players in 2008.

== Notable players ==
Had international caps for their respective countries. Players whose name is listed in bold represented their countries while playing for FC Moscow/Torpedo-ZIL/Torpedo-Metallurg.

USSR/Russia

- (Soviet Union) (Commonwealth of Independent States) (Russia) Dmitri Kuznetsov
- (Soviet Union) (Commonwealth of Independent States) (Russia) Oleg Sergeyev
- (Soviet Union) (Russia) Aleksandr Borodyuk
- (Soviet Union) (Russia) Sergei Gorlukovich
- (Commonwealth of Independent States) Sergey Shustikov
- (Commonwealth of Independent States) (Russia) Dmitri Khlestov
- (Russia) **Roman Adamov**
- (Russia) Dimitri Ananko
- (Russia) Aleksei Arifullin
- (Russia) Aleksei Berezutski
- (Russia) Vasili Berezutski
- (Russia) Pyotr Bystrov
- (Russia) Aleksandr Filimonov
- (Russia) **Dmitri Kirichenko**
- (Russia) Oleg Kornaukhov
- (Russia) Oleg Kuzmin
- (Russia) Vladimir Lebed
- (Russia) Kirill Nababkin
- (Russia) Andrei Novosadov
- (Russia) Nikolai Pisarev
- (Russia) Sergei Podpaly
- (Russia) **Aleksei Rebko**
- (Russia) Aleksandr Ryazantsev
- (Russia) Aleksandr Samedov
- (Russia) Aleksandr Sheshukov
- (Russia) **Sergei Semak**
- (Russia) Roman Shirokov
- (Russia) Dmitri Tarasov

Former Socialist Republic countries

- (Armenia) **Sargis Hovsepyan**

- (Armenia) **Yervand Krbachyan**
- (Armenia) **Andrey Movsisyan**
- (Azerbaijan) **Emin Agaev**
- (Azerbaijan) **Vyaçeslav Lıçkin**
- (Azerbaijan) Narvik Sirkhayev
- (Belarus) **Anton Amelchenko**
- (Belarus) Barys Haravoy
- (Belarus) Vladimir Korytko
- (Belarus) **Andrei Ostrovskiy**
- (Belarus) **Syarhey Yaskovich**
- (Belarus) **Yuri Zhevnov**
- (Georgia (country)) Gia Grigalava
- (Georgia (country)) Mikheil Jishkariani
- (Georgia (country)) **Alexander Rekhviashvili**
- (Kazakhstan) **Ruslan Baltiev**
- (Kazakhstan) Evgeniy Lovchev
- (Moldova) **Alexandru Curtianu**
- (Moldova) **Alexandru Epureanu**
- (Moldova) **Stanislav Ivanov**
- (Moldova) **Alexandru Popovici**
- (Moldova) **Radu Rebeja**
- (Tajikistan) **Oleg Shirinbekov**
- (Ukraine) Yuri Moroz
- (Ukraine) Oleksandr Pomazun
- (Uzbekistan) **Bakhtiyor Ashurmatov**
- (Uzbekistan) **Ulugbek Bakayev**

Europe

- (Bosnia and Herzegovina) Ricardo Baiano
- (Bosnia and Herzegovina) Miro Katić
- (Bosnia and Herzegovina) **Branislav Krunić**

- (Bosnia and Herzegovina) **Munever Rizvić**
- (Czech Republic) Roman Hubník
- (Latvia) **Vladimirs Koļesņičenko**
- (Latvia) **Andris Vaņins**
- (Lithuania) **Edgaras Česnauskis**
- (Lithuania) **Ignas Dedura**
- (Lithuania) **Rolandas Džiaukštas**
- (Lithuania) **Tadas Gražiūnas**
- (Lithuania) **Saulius Mikalajūnas**
- (Lithuania) **Irmantas Stumbrys**
- (Lithuania) Giedrius Žutautas
- (North Macedonia) **Goran Maznov**
- (Poland) **Damian Gorawski**
- (Poland) **Mariusz Jop**
- (Romania) **Pompiliu Stoica**
- (Serbia) Zvonimir Vukić
- (Slovakia) **Martin Jakubko**
- (Slovenia) **Amir Karič**
- (Slovenia) **Branko Ilič**
- (Sweden) Jonas Wallerstedt

South America

- (Argentina) Pablo Barrientos
- (Argentina) Héctor Bracamonte
- (Argentina) Maxi López
- (Argentina) Maximiliano Moralez

Africa

- (Cameroon) **Jerry-Christian Tchuissé**
- (Ghana) Baba Adamu
- (Nigeria) **Isaac Okoronkwo**
- (South Africa) **Stanton Fredericks**

== Managers ==
Information correct as of match played 29 November 2009. Only competitive matches are counted.

Name	Nat.	From	To	P	W	D	L	GS	GA	%W	Honours	Notes
Valery Petrakov	Russia	1 January 2004	14 July 2005	50	19	16	15	67	55	38.00		
Leonid Slutsky	Russia	15 July 2005	11 November 2007	94	43	26	25	131	108	45.74		
Oleg Blokhin	Ukraine	14 December 2007	27 November 2008	36	13	12	11	46	41	36.11		
Miodrag Božović	Montenegro	1 January 2009	1 March 2010	34	16	9	9	45	31	47.06		

- Notes:

P – Total of played matches W – Won matches D – Drawn matches L – Lost matches GS – Goal scored GA – Goals against
%W – Percentage of matches won

Nationality is indicated by the corresponding FIFA country code(s).

== Club records ==
=== Top goalscorers ===
As of Match played 29 November 2009

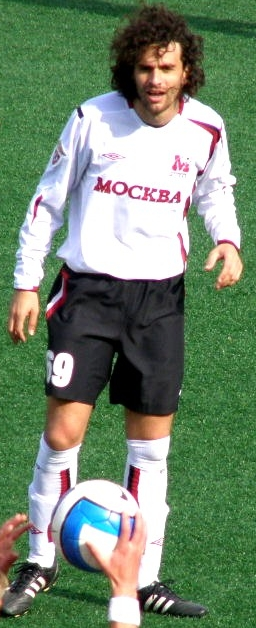
Héctor Bracamonte was FC Moscow's leading goalscorer, scoring 36 goals in 157 games during his 5.5-years at the club.

	Name	Years	League	Russian Cup	Europe	Total
1	(Argentina) Héctor Bracamonte	2004–2009	30 (136)	5 (13)	1 (8)	36 (157)
2	(Russia) Dmitri Kirichenko	2005–2007	26 (54)	4 (5)	0 (4)	30 (63)
3	(Russia) Roman Adamov	2006–2008	23 (63)	3 (9)	2 (4)	28 (76)
4	(Russia) Sergei Semak	2006–2007	12 (57)	3 (12)	0 (4)	15 (73)
5	(Russia) Aleksei Melyoshin	2004–2008	10 (78)	1 (5)	0 (0)	11 (83)
6	(Argentina) Pablo Barrientos	2006–2008	6 (33)	4 (9)	0 (0)	10 (42)
6	(Moldova) Stanislav Ivanov	2004–2008	9 (112)	1 (15)	0 (6)	10 (133)
6	(Russia) Pyotr Bystrov	2006–2008	7 (69)	2 (11)	1 (8)	10 (88)
9	(Argentina) Maxi López	2007–2009	9 (22)	0 (2)	0 (1)	9 (25)
9	(Russia) Aleksandr Samedov	2008–2009	2 (44)	0 (5)	2 (4)	9 (53)
9	(Russia) Oleg Kuzmin	2004–2008	6 (115)	2 (15)	1 (7)	9 (137)
9	(Lithuania) Edgaras Česnauskis	2008–2009	5 (35)	3 (6)	1 (3)	9 (44)

=== Most appearances ===
As of Match played 29 November 2009

	Name	Years	League	Russian Cup	Europe	Total
1	(Argentina) Héctor Bracamonte	2004–2009	136 (30)	13 (5)	8 (1)	157 (36)
2	(Belarus) Yuri Zhevnov	2005–2009	124 (0)	13 (0)	7 (0)	144 (0)
3	(Russia) Oleg Kuzmin	2004–2008	115 (6)	15 (2)	7 (1)	137 (9)
4	(Moldova) Stanislav Ivanov	2004–2008	112 (9)	15 (1)	6 (0)	133 (10)
5	(Moldova) Radu Rebeja	2004–2008	110 (3)	13 (0)	4 (0)	127 (3)
6	(Russia) Dmitri Godunok	2005–2008	100 (3)	11 (1)	8 (0)	119 (4)
7	(Poland) Mariusz Jop	2004–2009	86 (4)	10 (0)	4 (0)	100 (4)
8	(Romania) Pompiliu Stoica	2004–2008	88 (0)	11 (0)	0 (0)	99 (0)
9	(Russia) Pyotr Bystrov	2006–2008	69 (7)	15 (2)	4 (1)	88 (10)
10	(Moldova) Alexandru Epureanu	2007–2009	71 (3)	12 (1)	3 (0)	86 (4)
