= CIS Super League =

- Region: Commonwealth of Independent States

The CIS Super League is a generic term given to the proposed association football league for the teams from Commonwealth of Independent States, mainly Russia and Ukraine. It is thought to be an idea inspired by the Kontinental Hockey League. Valery Gazzaev was the head of the committee in charge of the united league.

== History ==
In 2012 UEFA gave the green light to the BeNe League, a top division of the women's league to include teams from both Belgium and Netherlands. Yevgeni Giner, chairman of CSKA Moscow has stated that he believes that this means that UEFA “has said it will allow the unification of championships”.

The sponsor of the league is to be Gazprom. Gazprom are the owners of the cross-border KHL team SKA Saint Petersburg and Russian Premier League team FC Zenit Saint Petersburg.

Fourteen of the sixteen clubs in the Russian Premier League and a Ukrainian club have attended meetings to discuss the formation of the new competition. The Times have reported that FC Shakhtar Donetsk and FC Dynamo Kiev of Ukraine, and FC BATE Borisov of Belarus, may be interested in the proposal.

Terek Grozny did not attend meetings and their vice-president Khaidar Alkhanov described the proposal as a "crazy scheme" and suggested it is disrespectful to the teams who would be left behind by the larger clubs.

FIFA's Sepp Blatter opposes the proposal referring to it as "impossible". He also said that "It goes against the principles of FIFA, therefore FIFA would never support such idea," and "We will never reconsider the boundaries of national leagues".

Finally, the project was closed in October 2015.

== See also ==
- United Tournament
  - 2013 United Tournament
  - 2014 United Supercup
- 1992 Soviet Top League
