= 2013 United Tournament =

Tournament details
- Host countries: Ukraine; Russia
- Dates: 27 June – 7 July 2013
- Teams: 4 (from 2 associations)
- Venue(s): 4 (in 3 host cities)

Final positions
- Champions: (Ukraine) Dynamo Kyiv (1st title)
- Runners-up: (Russia) Spartak Moscow
- Third place: (Russia) Zenit St. Petersburg
- Fourth place: (Ukraine) Shakhtar Donetsk

Tournament statistics
- Matches played: 8
- Goals scored: 17 (2.13 per match)
- Top scorer(s): (Ukraine) Harmash (Dynamo Kyiv) (Ukraine) Husyev (Dynamo Kyiv) (2 goals)

The 2013 United Tournament was an exhibition football club tournament that took place in Ukraine and Russia on 27 June – 7 July 2013. Four teams participated in it: Shakhtar Donetsk and Dynamo Kyiv from Ukraine; Zenit St. Petersburg and Spartak Moscow from Russia. On 7 July 2013, Dynamo Kyiv beat Spartak Moscow 2–1 and won this tournament.

Each team played four matches: both a home and away fixture against the two teams from the opposing country. The teams didn't play against their domestic rivals. Zenit St. Petersburg played their home matches in Kyiv, as their Petrovsky Stadium was under renovation works. The tiebreakers were: head-to-head results over the two legs, the aggregate goal difference. In total, 8 substitutions were allowed, but the additional five must take place at half time.

== Teams ==
Team	Recent domestic honours	Continental performances
(Ukraine) Shakhtar Donetsk	2012–13 Ukrainian Premier League – Winner; 2012–13 Ukrainian Cup – Winner	2012–13 UEFA Champions League – Round of 16
(Ukraine) Dynamo Kyiv	2012–13 Ukrainian Premier League – Third	2012–13 UEFA Champions League – Group stage 2012–13 UEFA Europa League – Round of 32
(Russia) Zenit St. Petersburg	2012–13 Russian Premier League – Runner-up	2012–13 UEFA Champions League – Group stage 2012–13 UEFA Europa League – Round of 16
(Russia) Spartak Moscow	2012–13 Russian Premier League – Fourth	2012–13 UEFA Champions League – Group stage

== Venues ==
Ukraine			Russia
Donetsk	Kyiv		Moscow
Donbas Arena	Olimpiyskiy National Sports Complex	Valeriy Lobanovskyi Dynamo Stadium	Eduard Streltsov Stadium
Capacity: 52,187	Capacity: 70,050	Capacity: 16,873	Capacity: 13,450

== Standings ==
Pos	Team	Pld	W	D	L	GF	GA	GD	Pts
1	(Ukraine) Dynamo Kyiv	4	3	1	0	8	5	+3	10
2	(Russia) Spartak Moscow	4	1	1	2	3	3	0	4
3	(Russia) Zenit St. Petersburg	4	1	1	2	5	6	−1	4
4	(Ukraine) Shakhtar Donetsk	4	1	1	2	1	3	−2	4

== Matches ==
27 June 2013
19:30 UTC+04:00

Spartak Moscow (Russia)	0–1	(Ukraine) Dynamo Kyiv
	Report1; Report2	Husyev 31' (pen.)

Eduard Streltsov Stadium, Moscow
Attendance: 8,000
Referee: Alexei Nikolaev (Russia)
27 June 2013
20:30 UTC+03:00

Zenit St. Petersburg (Russia)	0–1	(Ukraine) Shakhtar Donetsk
	Report1; Report2	Douglas Costa 69'

Valeriy Lobanovskyi Dynamo Stadium, Kyiv
Attendance: 4,000
Referee: Serhiy Boyko (Ukraine)

30 June 2013
19:00 UTC+03:00

Shakhtar Donetsk (Ukraine)	0–0	(Russia) Spartak Moscow
	Report1; Report2

Donbas Arena, Donetsk
Attendance: 24,391
Referee: Anatoly Abdula (Ukraine)
30 June 2013
21:00 UTC+03:00

Zenit St. Petersburg (Russia)	1–2	(Ukraine) Dynamo Kyiv
Fayzulin 20'	Report1; Report2	Harmash 11'; Mehmedi 82'

Olimpiyskiy National Sports Complex, Kyiv
Attendance: 28,300
Referee: Evgen Aranovsky (Ukraine)

3 July 2013
19:30 UTC+04:00

Spartak Moscow (Russia)	2–0	(Ukraine) Shakhtar Donetsk
Movsisyan 43' (pen.); Yakovlev 75'	Report1; Report2

Eduard Streltsov Stadium, Moscow
Attendance: 6,000
Referee: Maksim Layushkin (Russia)
3 July 2013
20:30 UTC+03:00

Dynamo Kyiv (Ukraine)	3–3	(Russia) Zenit St. Petersburg
Harmash 8'; Dudu 58'; Luís Neto 90' (o.g.)	Report1; Report2	Danny 40'; Kerzhakov 76'; Đorđević 84'

Olimpiyskiy National Sports Complex, Kyiv
Attendance: 30,219
Referee: Yuri Mozharovsky (Ukraine)

6 July 2013
19:00 UTC+03:00

Shakhtar Donetsk (Ukraine)	0–1	(Russia) Zenit St. Petersburg
	Report1; Report2	Bystrov 89'

Donbas Arena, Donetsk
Attendance: 23,331
Referee: Sergiy Berezka (Ukraine)
7 July 2013
20:30 UTC+03:00

Dynamo Kyiv (Ukraine)	2–1	(Russia) Spartak Moscow
Lens 15'; Husyev 61'	Report1; Report2	Insaurralde 90+2'

Olimpiyskiy National Sports Complex, Kyiv
Attendance: 51,300
Referee: Yuri Vaks (Ukraine)

== Winners ==
Winners of the 2013 United Tournament
(Ukraine)
FC Dynamo Kyiv
First title

== See also ==
- Channel One Cup
- Super Cup of Champions
- Match World Cup
- Spartak Moscow–Dynamo Kyiv derby
