= Soviet Union football league system =

The Soviet Union football league system was a series of interconnected leagues for men's association football clubs in the Soviet Union which included "teams of masters" (a term for a professional association football team) from constituent union republics. The system has a hierarchical format with promotion and relegation between leagues at different levels, allowing even the smallest club the theoretical possibility of ultimately rising to the very top of the system. For most of its time, the all-union level had two tiers, while for a good portion of the Soviet period there existed a third tier, and for a much less period, a fourth.

The exact number of Soviet teams of masters varied from year to year as clubs (teams) joined and left leagues, folded or merged altogether. On occasions a season competition format included multiple stages with several groups including the top tier. The third tier (better known as the Second League) since its revival in 1963 consisted from about five to nine groups known as zones, the winners of which qualified to a promotional play-off tournament.

Rotation between republican competitions and the all-union football "pyramid" existed only for the Russian SFSR and the Ukrainian SSR.

The Soviet Union football league system was dominated by teams of masters from the Russian SFSR and particularly from Moscow. The focal game of the top league initially involved the Moscow derby between Spartak and Dinamo (see Oldest Russian derby). Following World War II, there appeared winning CDKA (today known as CSKA), which was also known as the team of lieutenants. Following some reforms in the organization of competitions in the early 1960s, the top league champion's title was gained by clubs outside of Moscow as the Soviet Union football league system was expanded with more teams of masters from various union republics and their regions (provinces). By 1980 the main game of the Soviet Top League became a rivalry between Russian and Ukrainian capitals Spartak Moscow and Dinamo Kiev (Dynamo Kyiv) (see Spartak Moscow–Dynamo Kyiv rivalry).

The pyramid for women's football in the Soviet Union existed only in 1990 and 1991 (during the process of dissolution of the Soviet Union) ran separately to three tiers.

== 1990–1991 ==
Level	League(s)/division(s)										P/R
1	Top League; Vysshaya Liga; 13-16 teams										▼0–1
2	First League; Pervaya Liga; 20-22 teams										▲3 ▼1
3	Second League; Vtoraya Liga										
3	West			Center			East				
4	Lower Second League; Nizshaya Vtoraya Liga										
4	Zone 1	Zone 2	Zone 3	Zone 4	Zone 5	Zone 6	Zone 7	Zone 8	Zone 9	Zone 10	

== 1971-1989 ==
Level	League(s)/division(s)									P/R
1	Top League; Vysshaya Liga; 16-18 teams									▼2
2	Soviet First League; Pervaya Liga; 22 teams									▲2 ▼3
3	Second League; Vtoraya Liga									▲3
3	Zone 1	Zone 2	Zone 3	Zone 4	Zone 5	Zone 6	Zone 7 (1972–73, 1980–90)	Zone 8 (1980–90)	Zone 9 (1980–90)	▲3

== 1970 ==
Level	League(s)/division(s)								P/R
1	Supreme Group A Vysshaya Gruppa A 16-18 teams								▼2
2	First Group A Pervaya Grouppa A 22 teams								▲2 ▼3
3	Second Group A Vtoraya Gruppa A								▲3
3	Zone 1			Zone 2			Zone 3		▲3
4	Class B Klass B								▲3
4	Zone 1 (Russia)	Zone 2 (Russia)	Zone 3 (Russia)	Zone 4 (Russia)	Zone 5 (Ukraine)	Zone 6 (Ukraine)	Zone 7 (Kazakhstan)	Zone 8 (Middle Asia)	▲3

== 1963-1969 ==
Level	League(s)/division(s)											P/R
1	First Group A Pervaya Gruppa A 16-18 teams											▼2
2	Second Group A Vtoraya Grouppa A											▲2 ▼3
2	Subgroup 1			Subgroup 2			Subgroup 3			Subgroup 4		▲2 ▼3
3	Class B Klass B											▲3
3	Russian SFSR						Ukrainian SSR			Union republics		▲3
3	Zone 1	Zone 2	Zone 3	Zone 4	Zone 5	Zone 6	Zone 1	Zone 2	Zone 3	Zone 1	Zone 2	▲3

== 1960-1962 ==
Level	League(s)/division(s)					P/R
1	Class A Klass A 16-18 teams					▼2
2	Class B Klass B					▲2 ▼3
2	Zone 1 (Russia)	Zone 2 (Russia)	Zone 3 (Russia)	Zone 4 (Russia)	Zone 5 (Russia)	▲2 ▼3
2	Zone 1 (Union republics)	Zone 2 (Union republics)	Zone 1 (Ukraine)	Zone 2 (Ukraine)	Zone 6 (Russia) (Zone 3 Ukraine); 1961 (1962)	▲2 ▼3

== 1953-1959 ==
Level	League(s)/division(s)							P/R
1	Class A Klass A 12-13 teams							▼2
2	Class B Klass B							▲2 ▼3
2	Zone 1	Zone 2	Zone 3 (1953–54, 1957–59)	Zone 4 (1957–59)	Zone 5 (1958–59)	Zone 6 (1958–59)	Zone 7 (1959)	▲2 ▼3

== 1950-1952 ==
Level	League(s)/division(s)	P/R
1	Class A Klass A 15-19 teams	▼2
2	Class B Klass B 14-18 teams	▲2 ▼3

== 1947-1949 ==
Level	League(s)/division(s)						P/R
1	First Group; Pervaya Gruppa; 13-18 teams						▼2
2	Second Group; Vtoraya Gruppa						▲2 ▼3
2	Zone 1 (Russia)	Zone 2 (Russia)	Trans-Caucasus; Zone 3 (Russia) (1949)	Middle-Asia; Zone 4 (Russia) (1949)	Central Zone	Ukraine	▲2 ▼3

== 1945-1946 ==
Level	League(s)/division(s)							P/R
1	First Group; Pervaya Gruppa; 12 teams							▼2
2	Second Group; Vtoraya Gruppa; 18 teams (1945)							▲2 ▼3
2	Southern subgroup 13 teams (1946)			Eastern Subgroup; 13 teams (1946)				▲2 ▼3
3	Third Group; Tretia Gruppa (1946)							▲2 ▼3
3	North-Caucasus Zone (Russia)	Center Zone (Russia)	Low-Volga Zone (Russia)	Volga Zone (Russia)	Ural Zone (Russia)	Sibir Zone (Russia)	Far-eastern Zone (Russia)	▲2 ▼3
3	Western Zone	Trans-Caucasus Zone	Middle Asia Zone	Center Zone (Ukraine)	East Zone (Ukraine)	South Zone (Ukraine)	West Zone (Ukraine)	▲2 ▼3

== 1936-1941 ==
Initially, for the Spring championship of 1936 there were only seven teams participating in the top group, while for the Fall championship the number of participants was increased to eight. A similar scenario took place in the second group as the spring championship saw some withdrawals. In the third group the number of participants was unchanged at eight for both parts of the 1936 season. At same time in the fourth group initially there were five teams for the spring half and six for the autumn.

In 1937 the number of participants continue to grow. Some reshuffling took place between groups A and B, although initially both consisted of eight teams. Groups V and G increased their team pools to 10 and 12 participants, respectively. Also for the 1937 there was introduced the Group D with two subgroups.

In 1938 all of groups were merged into one big super league of 26 teams.

In 1939 and 1940 season Group A consisted of 14 teams. There also was a revival of Group B with 23 teams at first and then reduced to 14 as well.

In 1941 season there was only Group A championship which was heavily adjusted to 15 teams.

Level	League(s)/division(s)		P/R
1	Group A Gruppa A 7-26 teams		
2	Group B Gruppa B 7-23 teams (1936–37, 1939–40)		▲ ▼
3	Group V Gruppa V 8-10 teams (1936–37)		
4	Group G Gruppa G 5-12 teams (1936–37)		
5	Group D Gruppa D 11 teams (1937)	Group D (Cities of the East); Gruppa D (Goroda Vostoka); 9 teams (1937)	

== Evolution of the Soviet football league system ==
Tier\Years	1936-37	1938	1939–40	1941	1942–44	1945-46	1947-49	1950–52	1953-59	1960–62	1963-69	1970	1971-89	1990–91
1	Gruppa A	Gruppa A	Gruppa A		Eastern Front; World War II	Pervaya Gruppa		Class A			Class A 1^{a} Gruppa	Class A Vysshaya Gruppa	Vysshaya Liga	
2	Gruppa B	Gruppa A	Gruppa B	None	Eastern Front; World War II	Vtoraya Gruppa		Class B			Class A 2^{a} Gruppa	Class A 1^{a} Gruppa	Pervaya Liga	
3	Gruppa V	Gruppa A	None		Eastern Front; World War II	Tretia Gruppa	None				Class B	Class A 2^{a} Gruppa	Vtoraya Liga	
4	Gruppa G	Gruppa A	None		Eastern Front; World War II	Republican level						Class B	None	Nizshaya Vtoraya Liga
5	Gruppa D	Gruppa A	None		Eastern Front; World War II	Republican level						Republican level		
6	Republican level				Eastern Front; World War II	Republican level						Republican level		
7+	Regional level													
