= 2008 Mohammed bin Rashid International Football Championship =

Dubai Cup
- Dates: 5–7 January 2008

Final positions
- Champions: (Brazil) Internacional
- Runners-up: (Italy) Internazionale
- Third place: (Germany) VfB Stuttgart
- Fourth place: (Netherlands) AFC Ajax

The 2008 Mohammed bin Rashid International Football Championship, also known as the 2008 Dubai Cup, is a friendly football tournament that took place in Dubai, United Arab Emirates. The 2008 edition took place from 5 till 7 January 2008.

== Participant teams ==
(Netherlands) AFC Ajax	KNVB Cup – 4th place
(Italy) Internazionale	Serie A 2006-07 – Runner-up
(Brazil) Internacional	FIFA Club World Cup 2006 – Winner
(Germany) VfB Stuttgart	Bundesliga 2006-07 – 3rd place

== Bracket ==
Semi-finals
5 January
(Brazil) Internacional	1
(Germany) Stuttgart	0
5 January
(Italy) Internazionale	2 (5)
(Netherlands) Ajax	2 (4)

Final
7 January
(Brazil) Internacional	2
(Italy) Internazionale	1
Third place
7 January
(Netherlands) Ajax	0
(Germany) Stuttgart	1

== First round ==
2008-01-05

Internacional (Brazil)	1–0	(Germany) Stuttgart
Alex 29'

2008-01-05

Internazionale (Italy)	2–2	(Netherlands) Ajax
Cruz 16', 68'		Perez 18'; Huntelaar 63' (pen.)
Penalties
	5–4

== Third place play-off ==
2008-01-07

Ajax (Netherlands)	0–1	(Germany) Stuttgart
		Farnerud 87'

== Final ==
2008-01-07

Internacional (Brazil)	2–1	(Italy) Internazionale
Fernandão 2'; Nilmar 66'		Jiménez 40'

== Champion ==
Dubai Cup
2008 Winners

Sport Club Internacional
First Title

== See also ==
- Dubai Football Challenge
