= Channel One Cup =

Channel One Cup may refer to:

- Channel One Cup (ice hockey), a Russian ice hockey tournament, administered by Channel One
- Channel One Cup (football), a Russian football tournament, administered by Channel One
- Channel One Trophy (also known as Channel One Cup), a Russian figure skating tournament, administered by Channel One
