= Matchworld Cup =

- Founded: 2011
- Region: Europe (UEFA), Asia (AFC), Africa (CAF)
- Teams: 6 (2011), 8 (2012), 4 (2013)
- Current champions: (Ukraine) Shakhtar Donetsk
- Most championships: Al-Hilal, Zenit St. Petersburg, Shakhtar Donetsk (1 title)
- Website: Matchworld Cup

The Matchworld Cup was an annual international exhibition football club competition hosted by the United Arab Emirates from 2011 to 2013. The winners were Al-Hilal in 2011, Zenit St. Petersburg in 2012, Shakhtar Donetsk in 2013.

The 2011 and 2012 competitions were held in Dubai, and the 2013 competition was held in Abu Dhabi's Zayed Sports City Stadium. The competition was organised by Matchworld Group Switzerland, Matchworld Football SA Sports Management Saudi Arabia, and Sportlive Russia.

== Results ==
Year	Final			Third Place			Venue	Teams
Year	Winner	Score	Runner-up	Third place	Score	Fourth place	Venue	Teams
2011	(Saudi Arabia) Al-Hilal	1–1 (4–1 pen.)	(Russia) Zenit St. Petersburg	(Slovakia) Žilina	3–1	(Iran) Persepolis	Al Maktoum Stadium, Dubai	6
2012	(Russia) Zenit St. Petersburg	5–0	Uzbekistan U-23	(Uzbekistan) Bunyodkor	1–1 (5–4 pen.)	(Ukraine) Shakhtar Donetsk	Maktoum Bin Rashid Stadium, Dubai	8
2013	(Ukraine) Shakhtar Donetsk	Round robin	(Russia) Zenit St. Petersburg	(Egypt) Zamalek	Round robin	(Saudi Arabia) Al-Hilal	Zayed Sports City Stadium, Abu Dhabi	4

== 2011 ==
=== Group stage ===
==== Group A ====
Team	Pld	W	D	L	GF	GA	GD	Pts
(Saudi Arabia) Al-Hilal	2	2	0	0	5	2	+3	6
(Slovakia) Žilina	2	1	0	1	6	4	+2	3
(Ukraine) Shakhtar Donetsk	2	0	0	2	3	8	−5	0

20 January 2011	Shakhtar Donetsk (Ukraine)	1–3	(Saudi Arabia) Al-Hilal	Al Maktoum Stadium
	Luiz Adriano 89'		Essa Al-Mehyani 47'; Ahmed Al-Fraidi 71'; Christian Wilhelmsson 90'

22 January 2011	Žilina (Slovakia)	5–2	(Ukraine) Shakhtar Donetsk	Al Maktoum Stadium
	Momodou Ceesay 4'; Róbert Jež 45'; Ondřej Šourek 53'; Róbert Pich 55'; Patrik Mráz 76'		Luiz Adriano 28(P)'; Henrikh Mkhitaryan 58(P)'

24 January 2011	Al-Hilal (Saudi Arabia)	2–1	(Slovakia) Žilina	Al Maktoum Stadium
	Christian Wilhelmsson 1'; Yasser Al-Qahtani 53'		Ondřej Šourek 54'

==== Group B ====
Team	Pld	W	D	L	GF	GA	GD	Pts
(Russia) Zenit St. Petersburg	2	2	0	0	5	0	+5	6
(Iran) Persepolis	2	1	0	1	3	4	−1	3
(Czech Republic) Sparta Prague	2	0	0	2	2	6	−4	0

20 January 2011	Persepolis (Iran)	3–2	(Czech Republic) Sparta Prague	Al Maktoum Stadium
	Maziar Zare 18(P)'; Ebrahim Shakouri 53'; Hadi Norouzi 58'		Lukáš Třešňák 48'; Léonard Kweuke 65'

22 January 2011	Sparta Prague (Czech Republic)	0–3	(Russia) Zenit St. Petersburg	Al Maktoum Stadium
			Aleksandr Kerzhakov 1'; Aleksei Ionov 35'; Bruno Alves 75'

24 January 2011	Zenit St. Petersburg (Russia)	2–0	(Iran) Persepolis	Al Maktoum Stadium
	Aleksandr Kerzhakov 7'; Sergey Semak 79'

=== Ranking matches ===
==== 5th place ====
26 January 2011	Sparta Prague (Czech Republic)	1–2	(Ukraine) Shakhtar Donetsk	Al Maktoum Stadium
	Václav Kadlec 45'		Douglas Costa 6'; Luiz Adriano 12'

==== 3rd place ====
26 January 2011	Persepolis (Iran)	1–3	(Slovakia) Žilina	Al Maktoum Stadium
	Maziar Zare 73(P)'		Tomáš Majtán 7'; Róbert Pich 11'; Ebrahim Shakouri 22(O.G.)'

==== Final ====
26 January 2011	Zenit St. Petersburg (Russia)	1–1 (1–4 p)	(Saudi Arabia) Al-Hilal	Al Maktoum Stadium
	Szabolcs Huszti 63'		Mirel Rădoi 90+3'
	Penalties
	Luković (penalty scored); Shirokov (penalty missed); Meira (penalty missed)		Rădoi (penalty scored); Al-Shalhoub (penalty scored); Al-Mehyani (penalty scored); Hawsawi (penalty scored)

2011 Matchworld Cup

1st title

== 2012 ==
=== Group stage ===
==== Group A ====
Team	Pld	W	D	L	GF	GA	GD	Pts
(Russia) Zenit St. Petersburg	2	2	0	0	4	2	+2	6
(Uzbekistan) Bunyodkor	2	1	0	1	2	2	0	3 (Note: Bunyodkor got the second place spot and Iraq u23 got the third place after a draw.)
Iraq U-23	2	1	0	1	2	2	0	3
(Switzerland) Neuchâtel Xamax	2	0	0	2	0	2	−2	0

Notes:

18 January 2012	Zenit St. Petersburg (Russia)	2–1	(Uzbekistan) Bunyodkor	Maktoum Bin Rashid Al Maktoum Stadium
	Huszti 13'; Criscito 41'		Murzoev 87'

18 January 2012	Neuchâtel Xamax (Switzerland)	0–1	Iraq U-23	Maktoum Bin Rashid Al Maktoum Stadium
			W. Salim 87' (pen.)

20 January 2012	Bunyodkor (Uzbekistan)	1–0	(Switzerland) Neuchâtel Xamax	Maktoum Bin Rashid Al Maktoum Stadium
	Pardaev 73'

20 January 2012	Iraq U-23	1–2	(Russia) Zenit St. Petersburg	Maktoum Bin Rashid Al Maktoum Stadium
	Abdul-Raheem 59'		Bukharov 10'; Kerzhakov 75'

==== Group B ====
Team	Pld	W	D	L	GF	GA	GD	Pts
Uzbekistan U-23	2	1	1	0	2	1	+1	5 (Note: One extra point for both Uzbekistan U-23 and Rostov for winning in penalties.)
(Ukraine) Shakhtar Donetsk	2	1	1	0	5	2	+3	4
(Russia) Rostov	2	0	1	1	1	2	−1	2
(Tunisia) Étoile Sportive du Sahel	2	0	1	1	2	5	−3	1

Notes:

19 January 2012	Shakhtar Donetsk (Ukraine)	1–1 (5–6 p)	Uzbekistan U-23	Maktoum Bin Rashid Al Maktoum Stadium
	Luiz Adriano 51'		Turaev 42'
	Penalties
	Alan Patrick (penalty missed); Luiz Adriano (penalty scored); Gai (penalty scored); Mkhitaryan (penalty scored); Kobin (penalty scored); Aghahowa (penalty scored); Hübschman (penalty missed)		Tuhtahujaev (penalty missed); Karimov (penalty scored); Rahmatullaev (penalty scored); Nagaev (penalty scored); Pirimov (penalty scored); Hashimov (penalty scored); Ibragimov (penalty scored)

19 January 2012	Rostov (Russia)	1–1 (4–2 p)	(Tunisia) Étoile Sportive du Sahel	Maktoum Bin Rashid Al Maktoum Stadium
	Bracamonte 10'		Chehoudi 61'
	Penalties
	Kolodin (penalty scored); Kruglov (penalty scored); Élson (penalty scored); Papadopulos (penalty scored)		Felhi (penalty missed); Jabeur (penalty scored); Santos (penalty scored); Chehoudi (penalty missed)

21 January 2012	Rostov (Russia)	0–1	Uzbekistan U-23	Maktoum Bin Rashid Al Maktoum Stadium
			Turaev 35'

21 January 2012	Étoile Sportive du Sahel (Tunisia)	1–4	(Ukraine) Shakhtar Donetsk	Maktoum Bin Rashid Al Maktoum Stadium
	Omrani 18'		Mkhitaryan 10', 12'; Srna 62'; Eduardo 88'

=== Ranking matches ===
==== 7th place ====
23 January 2012	Neuchâtel Xamax (Switzerland)	3–5	(Tunisia) Étoile Sportive du Sahel	Maktoum Bin Rashid Al Maktoum Stadium
	Souni 15'; Mbengue 53'; Gomes 75'		Chehoudi 6', 33'; Jbali 8', 37'; Sassi 67'

==== 5th place ====
23 January 2012	Iraq U-23	1–2	(Russia) Rostov	Maktoum Bin Rashid Al Maktoum Stadium
	Abdul-Raheem 24'		Gațcan 6'; Poloz 81'

==== 3rd place ====
23 January 2012	Bunyodkor (Uzbekistan)	1–1 (5–4 p)	(Ukraine) Shakhtar Donetsk	Maktoum Bin Rashid Al Maktoum Stadium

==== Final ====
23 January 2012	Zenit St. Petersburg (Russia)	5–0	Uzbekistan U-23	Maktoum Bin Rashid Al Maktoum Stadium

2012 Matchworld Cup

1st title

== 2013 ==
=== Final standings ===
Pos	Team	Pld	W	D	L	GF	GA	GD	Pts
1	(Ukraine) Shakhtar Donetsk	2	2	0	0	6	4	+2	6
2	(Russia) Zenit St. Petersburg	2	1	0	1	4	2	+2	3
3	(Egypt) Zamalek	2	1	0	1	3	3	0	3
4	(Saudi Arabia) Al-Hilal	2	0	0	2	3	7	−4	0

All times are local (UTC+4).

=== Matches ===
16 January 2013	Zenit St. Petersburg (Russia)	4–1	(Saudi Arabia) Al-Hilal	Zayed Sports City Stadium, Abu Dhabi, UAE
17:00	Aleksandr Bukharov 27'; Hulk 36' (pen.); Bruno Alves 58'; Luka Đorđević 62'	Report	Sulaiman Al-Abdullah 31'	Attendance: 20; Referee: Abdulwahed Khater (UAE)

16 January 2013	Shakhtar Donetsk (Ukraine)	3–2	(Egypt) Zamalek	Zayed Sports City Stadium, Abu Dhabi, UAE
20:00	Eduardo da Silva 9'; Darijo Srna 43'; Henrikh Mkhitaryan 89'	Report	Ahmed Hassan 17'; Mohamed Ibrahim 21'	Attendance: 550; Referee: Ali Hasan Kareem (UAE)

19 January 2013	Shakhtar Donetsk (Ukraine)	3–2	(Saudi Arabia) Al-Hilal	Zayed Sports City Stadium, Abu Dhabi, UAE
17:00	Henrikh Mkhitaryan 20'; Răzvan Raț 66'; Taison 82'	Report	Yoo Byung-Soo 38'; Wesley Lopes 88' (pen.)	Attendance: 690; Referee: Adel Alnaqbi (UAE)

19 January 2013	Zenit St. Petersburg (Russia)	0–1	(Egypt) Zamalek	Zayed Sports City Stadium, Abu Dhabi, UAE
20:00		Report	Ahmed Samir 34'	Attendance: 100; Referee: Hamed Ali Youssef (UAE)

2013 Match World Cup

1st title

== Performances by team ==
Team	Winners	Runners-up	Third	Fourth
(Russia) Zenit St. Petersburg	1 (2012)	2 (2011, 2013)		
(Ukraine) Shakhtar Donetsk	1 (2013)			1 (2012)
(Saudi Arabia) Al-Hilal	1 (2011)			1 (2013)
Uzbekistan U-23		1 (2012)		
(Slovakia) Žilina			1 (2011)	
(Uzbekistan) Bunyodkor			1 (2012)	
(Egypt) Zamalek			1 (2013)	
(Iran) Persepolis				1 (2011)

== See also ==
- Dubai Cup
- Super Cup of Champions
- Dubai Challenge Cup
- United Tournament
