= 2014 United Supercup =

Tournament details
- Host country: Israel
- Dates: 30 January – 5 February 2014
- Teams: 4 (from 2 associations)
- Venue: 1 (in 1 host city)

Final positions
- Champions: (Ukraine) Shakhtar Donetsk (1st title)
- Runners-up: (Ukraine) Metallist Kharkiv
- Third place: (Russia) Zenit Saint Petersburg
- Fourth place: (Russia) CSKA Moscow

Tournament statistics
- Matches played: 6
- Goals scored: 13 (2.17 per match)
- Top scorer(s): (Brazil) Douglas Costa (Croatia) Darijo Srna (2 goals)
- Best player: (Croatia) Darijo Srna

The 2014 United Supercup, officially named G-Drive 2014 United Supercup (also known as 2014 United Tournament), was an exhibition football club tournament held in Israel from 30 January – 5 February 2014. It is the second edition of the United Tournament. The location was picked because the winter conditions would make it hard to play the games in Russia or Ukraine.

== Summary ==
The four participating clubs were Shakhtar Donetsk, Metalist Kharkiv from Ukraine and Zenit St. Petersburg, CSKA Moscow from Russia. The clubs were picked by the principle of two top placed clubs in the local championships.

Before the tournament a press conference was held in Tel Aviv. Among the participants were Valery Gazzaev, the head of the committee in charge of the united championship, Mircea Lucescu, the manager of Shakhtar Donetsk, Leonid Slutskiy, the manager of PFC CSKA Moscow, Myron Markevych, the manager of Metallist Kharkiv, and Luciano Spalletti, the manager of FC Zenit Saint Petersburg. The tournament was also attended by Mikhail Fomenko, the manager of Ukraine national football team.

Shakhtar Donetsk and CSKA Moscow were based in Tel Aviv for the tournament, while Metallist Kharkiv in Netanya, and Zenit Saint Petersburg in Herzeliya.

The total prize money was mln, including for the winner, €250,000 for the runner-up, €220,000 for the third place and for the fourth place. The games were broadcast by Football 1 and Football 2 channels in Ukraine and by Russia 2, Sport 1 and 100TV channels in Russia.

The tournament format was round-robin (instead of two-legged ties for all pairs of clubs from different countries, as played previously). In case of a draw at the end of the 90 minutes, penalties were used to decide the winner (however, a club winning on penalties gets 2 points and not 3, while a club losing on penalties gets 1 point for draw).

The first two games of the tournament were watched by 3 million Russians, which is 1 million more than the previous edition average.

The 2014 tournament was won by Shakhtar Donetsk from Ukraine, winning all 3 games. Douglas Costa and Darijo Srna from Shakhtar Donetsk became the joint top scorers of the tournament scoring two goals each, Darijo Srna was also named the tournament best player.

== Teams ==
Team	Recent domestic honours	Continental performances
(Ukraine) Shakhtar Donetsk	2012–13 Ukrainian Premier League – Winner; 2012–13 Ukrainian Cup – Winner	2013–14 UEFA Champions League – Group stage 2013–14 UEFA Europa League – Round of 32
(Ukraine) Metalist Kharkiv	2012–13 Ukrainian Premier League – Runner-up	2013–14 UEFA Champions League – Qualifying
(Russia) CSKA Moscow	2012–13 Russian Premier League – Winner; 2012–13 Russian Cup – Winner	2013–14 UEFA Champions League – Group stage
(Russia) Zenit St. Petersburg	2012–13 Russian Premier League – Runner-up	2013–14 UEFA Champions League – Round of 16

== Venues ==
Israel
Petah Tikva
HaMoshava Stadium
Capacity: 11,500
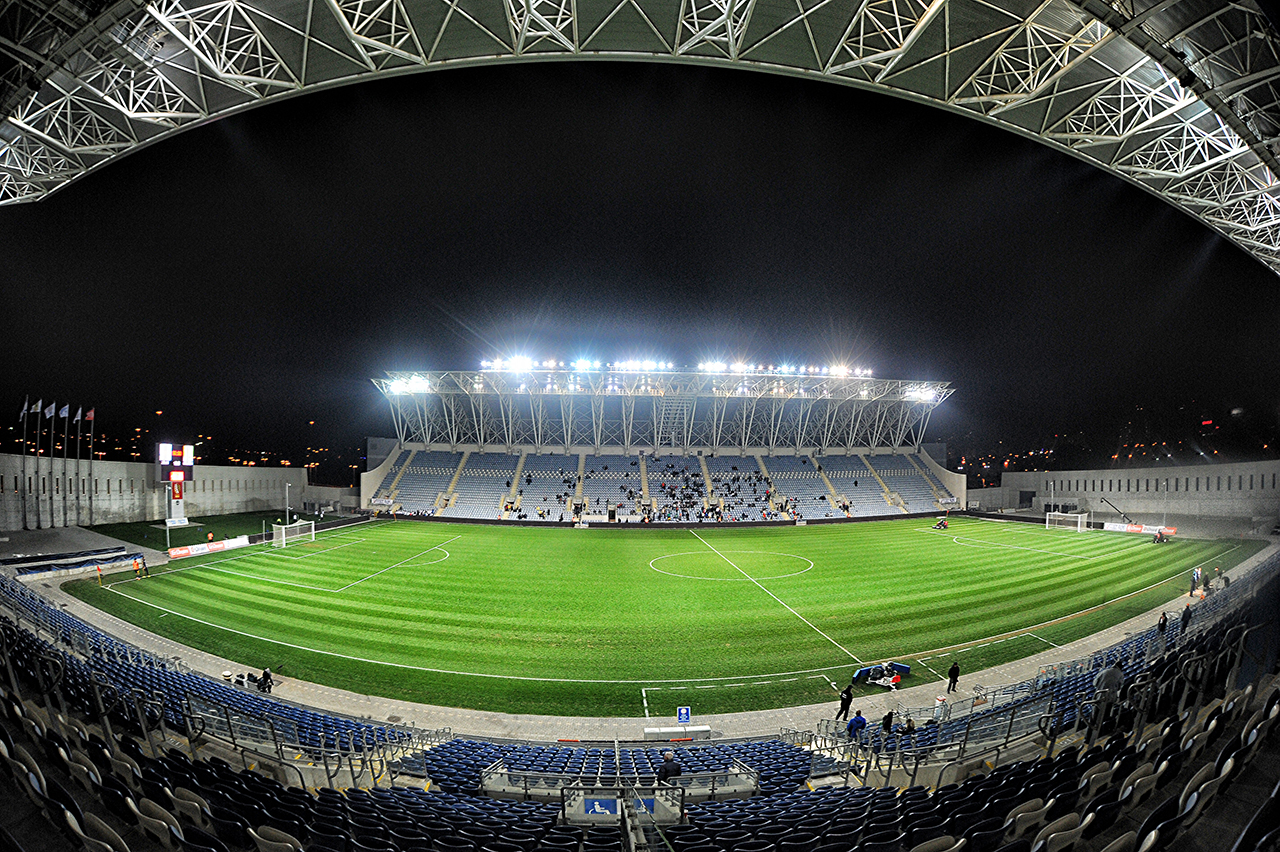

== Standings ==
Pos	Team	Pld	W	PSW	PSL	L	GF	GA	GD	Pts
1	(Ukraine) Shakhtar Donetsk	3	3	0	0	0	6	2	+4	9
2	(Ukraine) Metalist Kharkiv	3	1	0	1	1	2	3	–1	4
3	(Russia) Zenit St. Petersburg	3	1	0	0	2	4	4	0	3
4	(Russia) CSKA Moscow	3	0	1	0	2	1	4	–3	2

== Matches ==
30 January 2014
18:00 UTC+02:00

CSKA Moscow (Russia)	0–0	(Ukraine) Metalist Kharkiv
	Report
Penalties
Tošić (penalty scored); Zreľák (penalty scored); Bazelyuk (penalty scored); Dzagoev (penalty scored)	4–2	(penalty missed) Dević; (penalty missed) Souza; (penalty scored) Blanco; (penalty scored) Gómez

HaMoshava Stadium, Petah Tikva (Israel)
Attendance: 2,000
Referee: Alon Yefet (Israel)
30 January 2014
21:00 UTC+02:00

Shakhtar Donetsk (Ukraine)	2–1	(Russia) Zenit St. Petersburg
Teixeira 22'; Douglas Costa 90+3'	Report	Ryazantsev 81' (pen.)

HaMoshava Stadium, Petah Tikva (Israel)
Attendance: 2,500
Referee: Liran Liani (Israel)

2 February 2014
18:00 UTC+02:00

Zenit St. Petersburg (Russia)	2–0	(Russia) CSKA Moscow
Hulk 17'; Shatov 89'	Report

HaMoshava Stadium, Petah Tikva (Israel)
Attendance: 2,000
Referee: Alon Yefet (Israel)
2 February 2014
21:00 UTC+02:00

Metalist Kharkiv (Ukraine)	0–2	(Ukraine) Shakhtar Donetsk
	Report	Douglas Costa 10'; Srna 70'

HaMoshava Stadium, Petah Tikva (Israel)
Attendance: 2,000
Referee: Eitan Shmuelevich (Israel)

5 February 2014
18:00 UTC+02:00

Zenit St. Petersburg (Russia)	1–2	(Ukraine) Metalist Kharkiv
Witsel 17'	Report	Gómez 52'; Marlos 76' (pen.)

HaMoshava Stadium, Petah Tikva (Israel)
Referee: Liran Liani (Israel)
5 February 2014
21:00 UTC+02:00

CSKA Moscow (Russia)	1–2	(Ukraine) Shakhtar Donetsk
Tošić 8'	Report	Srna 40'; Taison 43'

HaMoshava Stadium, Petah Tikva (Israel)
Referee: Eli Hacmon (Israel)

== Top scorers ==
Rank	Nat.	Player	Goals (pen.)	Team
1	(Brazil)	Douglas Costa	2	Shakhtar
	(Croatia)	Darijo Srna	2	Shakhtar
2	(Brazil)	Alex Teixeira	1	Shakhtar
	(Brazil)	Taison	1	Shakhtar
	(Brazil)	Hulk	1	Zenit
	(Russia)	Aleksandr Ryazantsev	1	Zenit
	(Russia)	Oleg Shatov	1	Zenit
	(Belgium)	Axel Witsel	1	Zenit
	(Serbia)	Zoran Tosic	1	CSKA
	(Argentina)	Alejandro Gómez	1	Metallist
	(Brazil)	Marlos	1	Metallist

== Winners ==
Winners of the 2014 United Supercup

Shakhtar Donetsk
First title

== See also ==
- Channel One Cup
