= HaMoshava Stadium =

Football stadium in Petah Tikva, Israel

Coordinates: 32°06′15.11″N 34°51′54.28″E

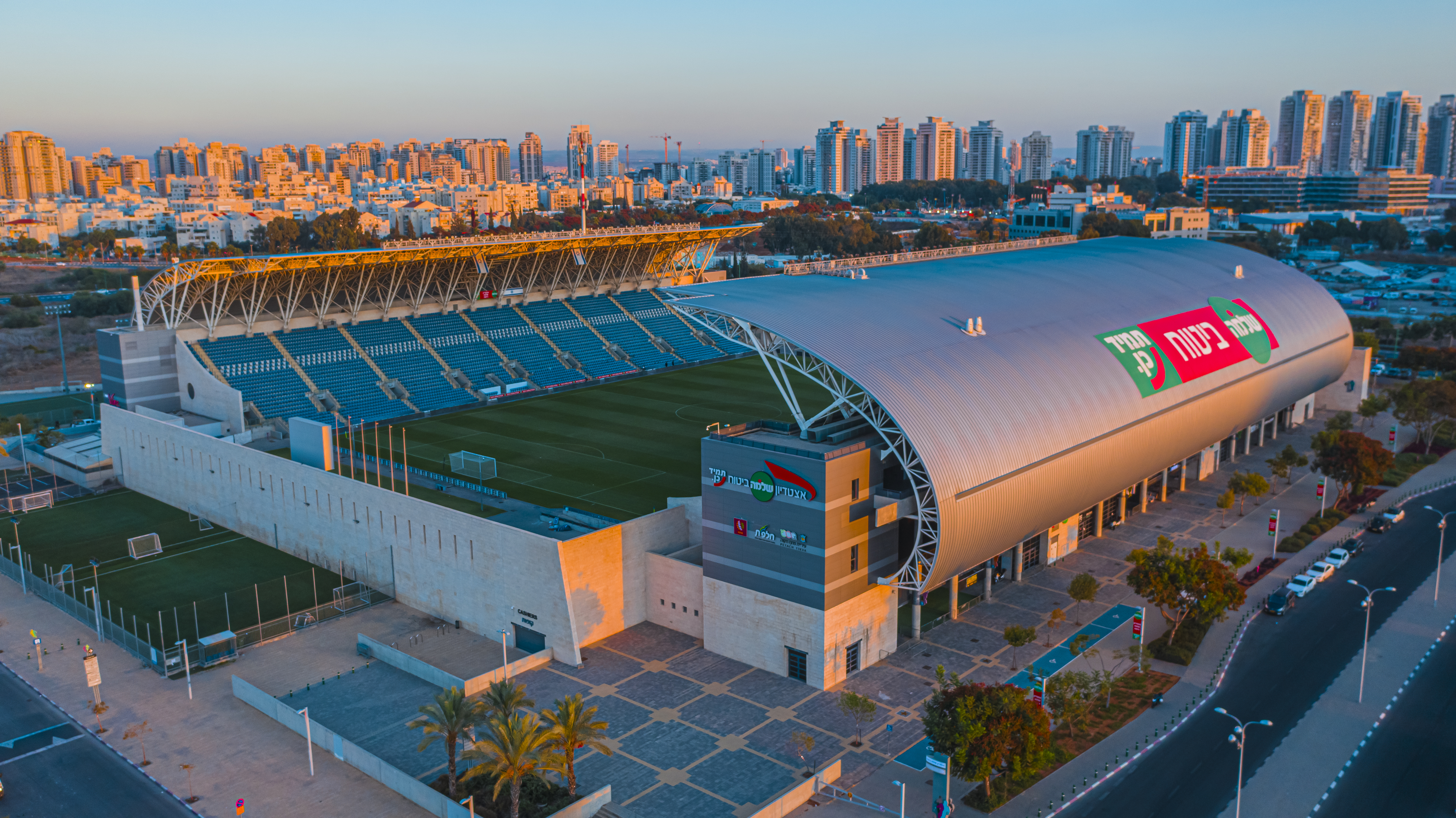
- UEFA
- Interactive map of HaMoshava Stadium
- Location: Petah Tikva, Israel
- Owner: Petah Tikva Municipality
- Operator: Petah Tikva Municipality
- Capacity: 11,500
- Surface: Grass
- Public transit: at Kiryat Arye; Yarkon Railway Line at Kiryat Aryeh

Construction
- Groundbreaking: 2007
- Opened: 6 December 2011
- Cost: $ 60 million
- Architect: GAB Architects

Tenants
- Hapoel Petah Tikva (2011–present); Maccabi Petah Tikva (2011–present): Major sporting events hosted; 2013 UEFA European Under-21 Championship; 2014 United Supercup

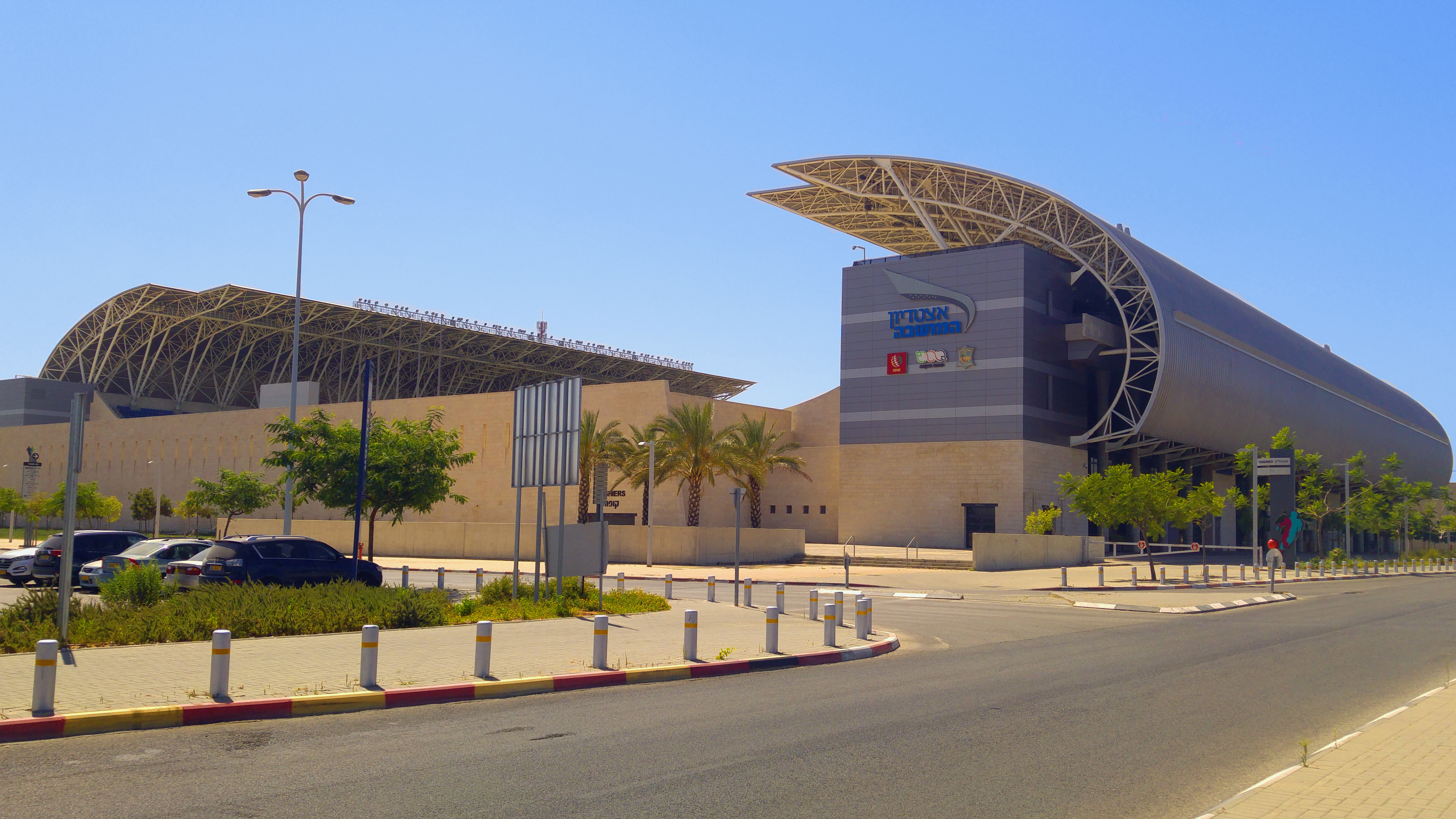
The western stand, June 2016

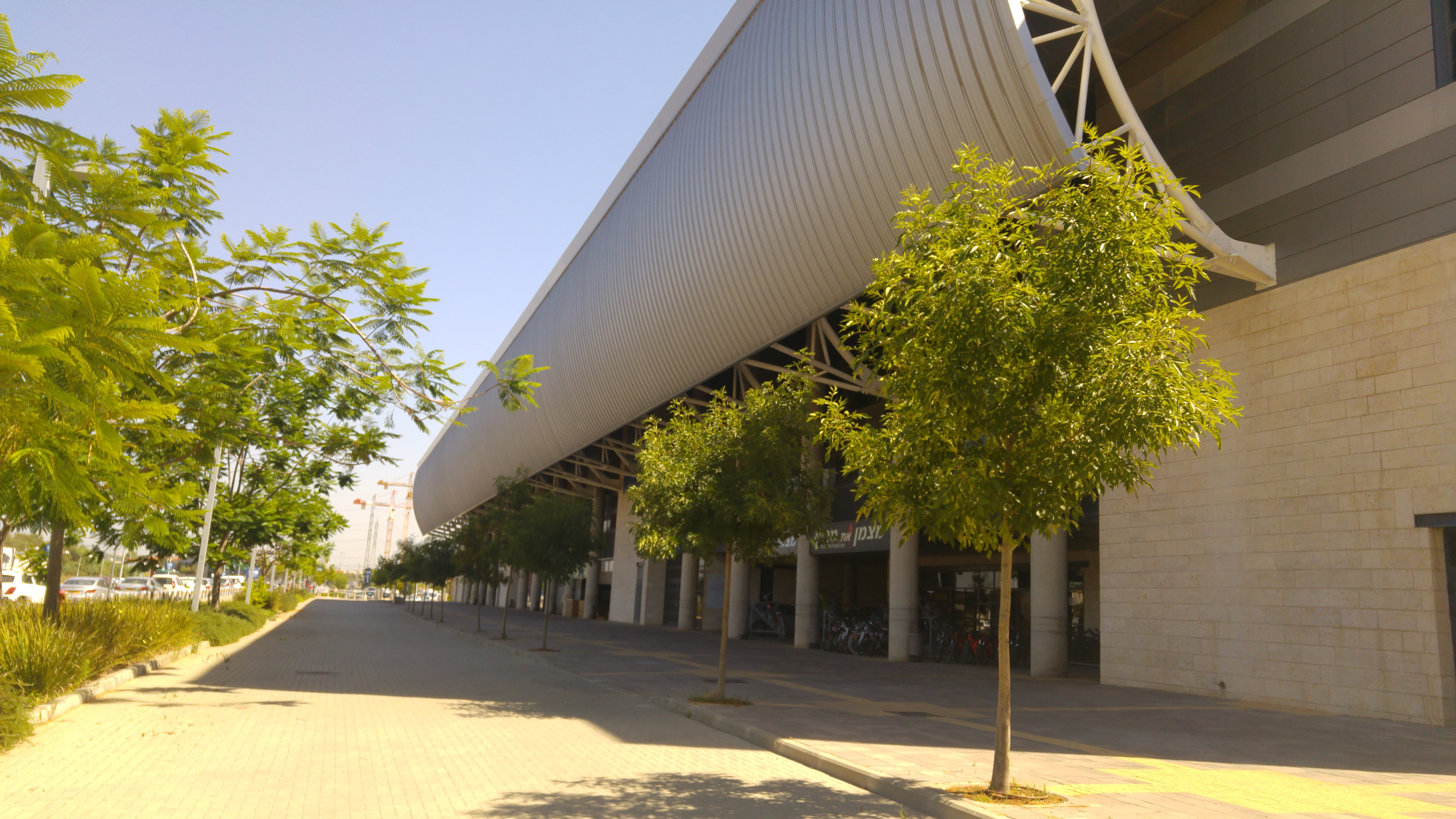
Main entrance, June 2016

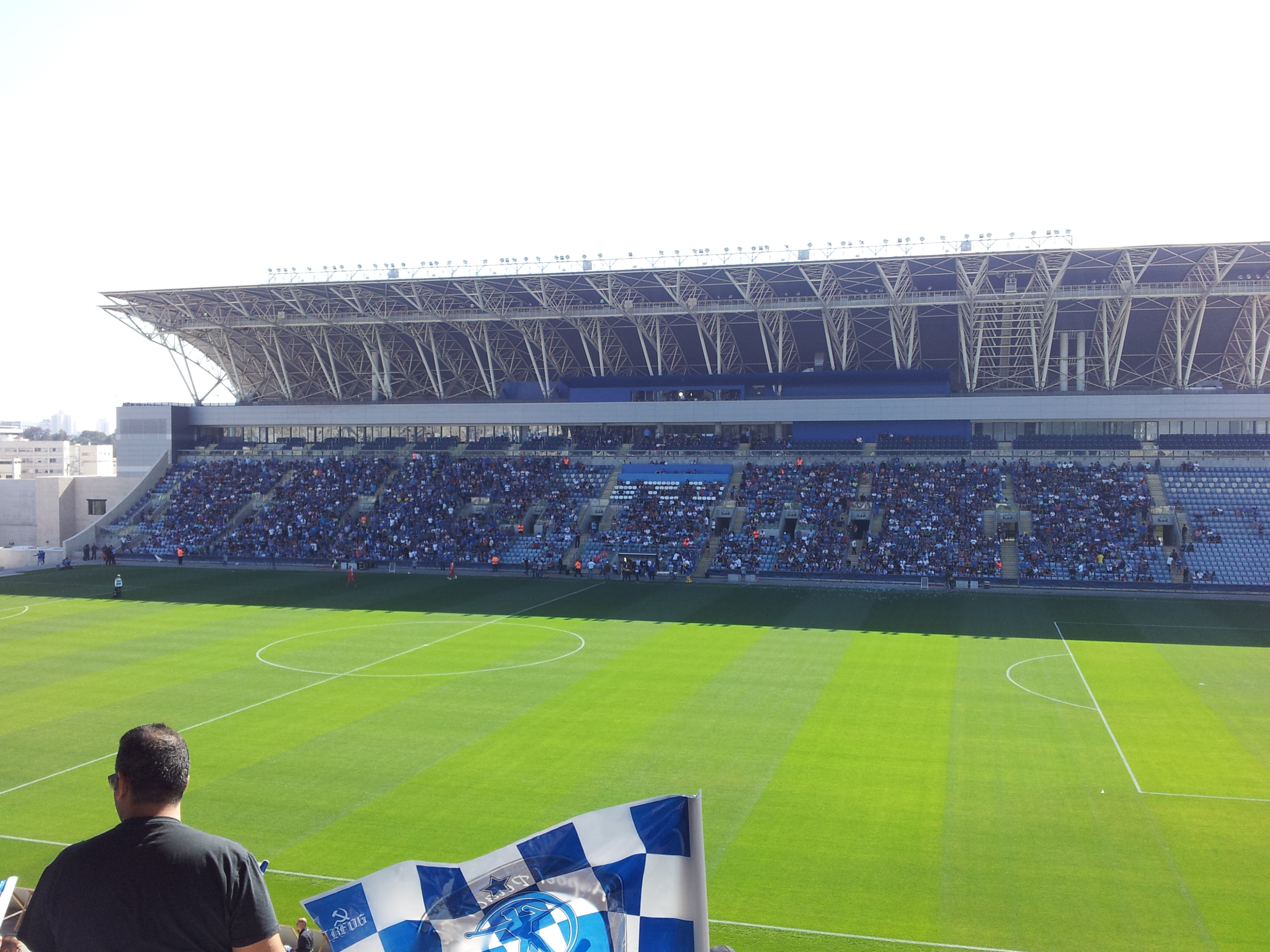
View of the east stand

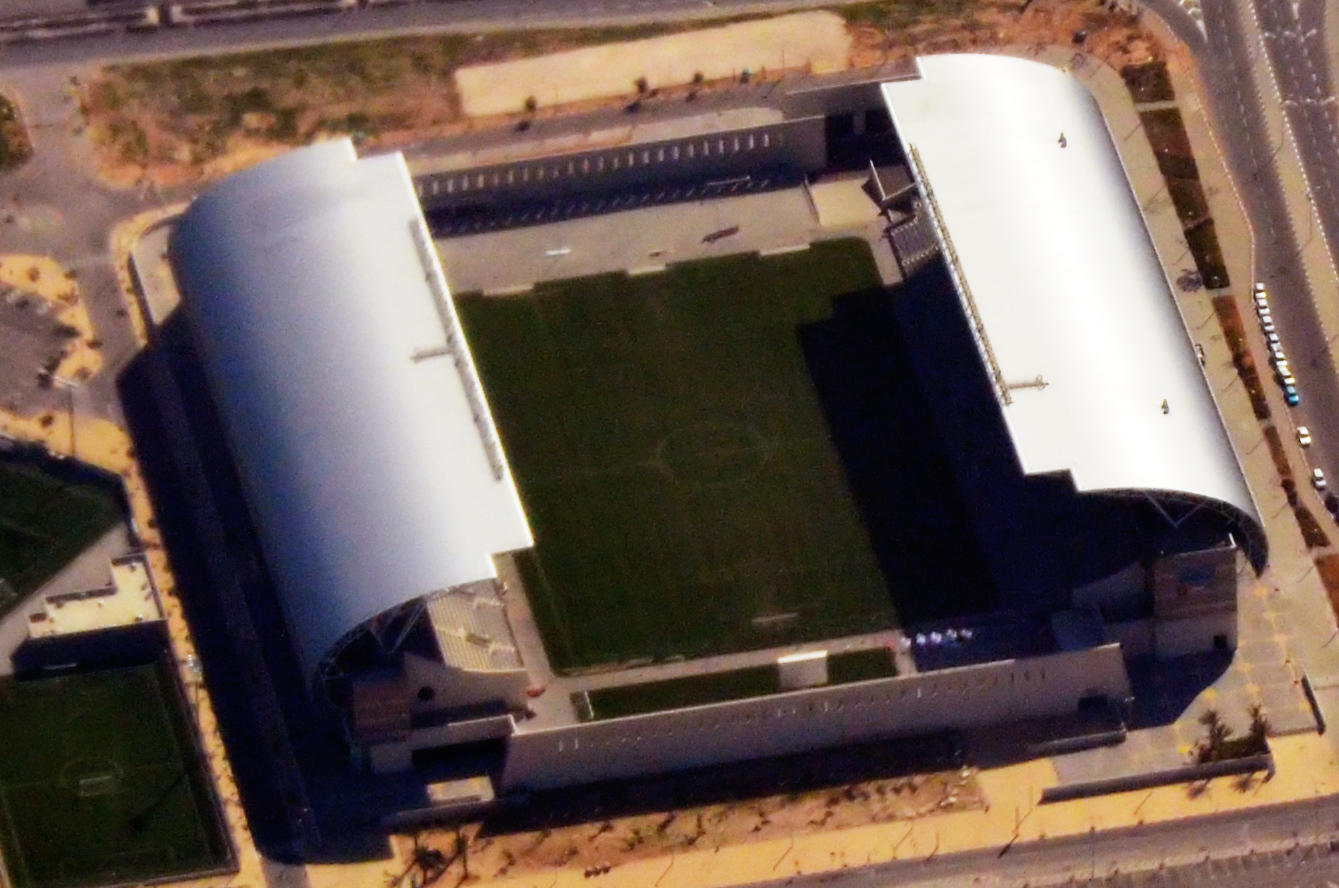
Aerial view

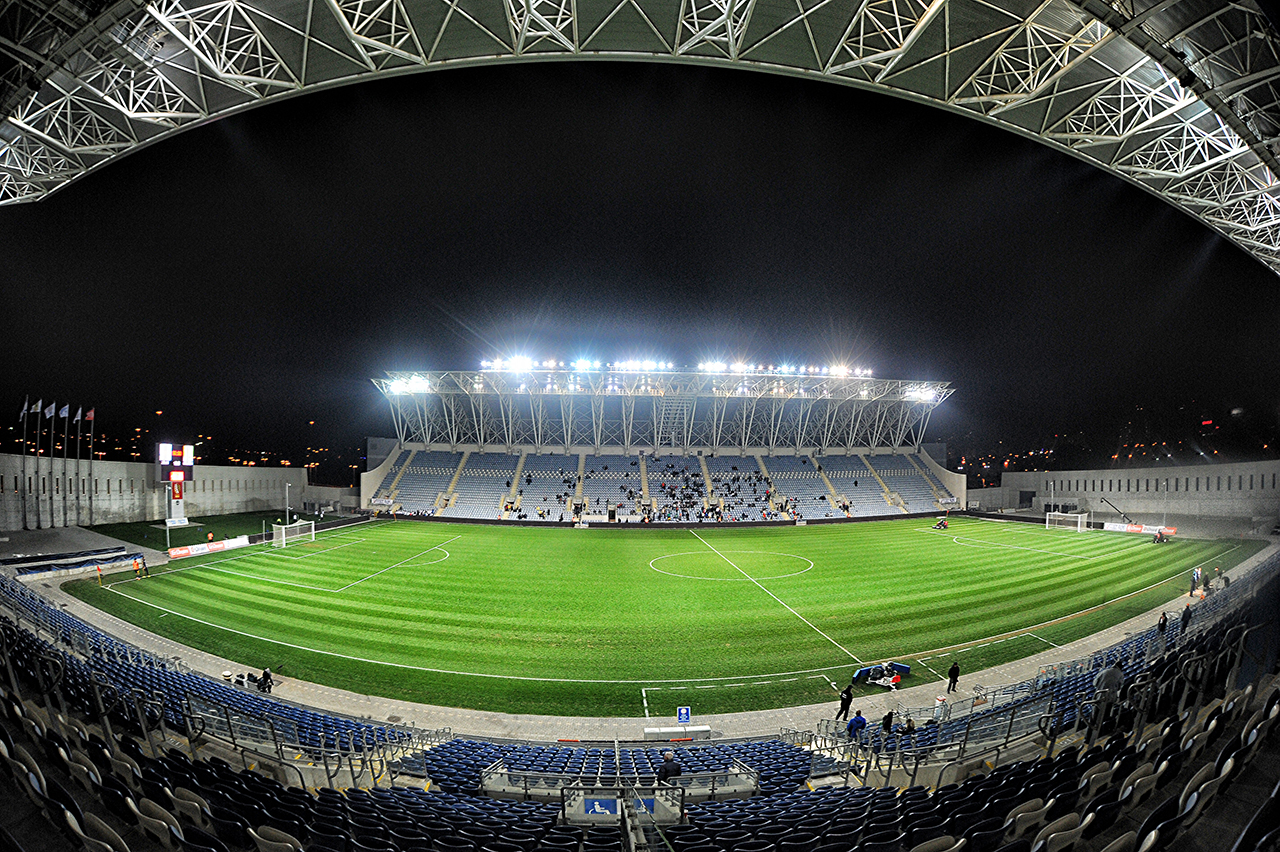
The stadium at night

The HaMoshava Stadium (Hebrew: אִצְטַדְיוֹן הַמוֹשָׁבָה), also known as Petah Tikva Stadium, is a football stadium in Petah Tikva, Israel completed in 2011. It is used mainly for football matches and is home to both Hapoel Petah Tikva and Maccabi Petah Tikva.

The stadium has an all-seated capacity of 11,500 with an option for further construction of 8,500 on the south and north stands, totaling 20,000 seats. The western stand has 5,040 seats, and the eastern stand has 5,914 seats.

As part of a larger sports park in the new industrial area of the city, the complex was designed to have a 3,000 seat multi-purpose arena, and artificial turf training fields. The budget for the stadium was US$25 million.

The designers of the new stadium were GAB (Goldshmidt Arditty Ben Nayim) Architects, who also designed the Netanya Stadium and Haberfeld Stadium.

The stadium was inaugurated on 6 December 2011, after almost two years of construction. It was one of four venues for the 2013 UEFA European Under-21 Football Championship, staging three group matches and a semi-final.

The stadium's naming was controversial in Petah Tikva, as some local residents wished to name it Rosh HaZahav (Gold head), after local city club Hapoel Petah Tikva and Israel national football player Nahum Stelmach. As a result, Maccabi Petah Tikva supporters proposed to name the stadium after Shmuel Ben-Dror, who played in the club for more than twenty years, was Israel's first captain and scored the first ever goal for Israel. After the city's refusal it was named HaMoshava after Petah Tikva's nickname, Em HaMoshavot (Mother of the Moshavot).

In 2014 HaMoshava Stadium hosted the 2014 United Supercup.

The stadium is expected to be one of the host stadiums in the 2027 Euro U19 which will be held in Israel.

== International matches ==
Date		Result		Competition	Attendance
29 Feb 2012	Israel	2–3	Ukraine	Friendly	7,000
17 Nov 2022	Israel	4–2	Zambia	Friendly	5,243
20 Nov 2022	Israel	2–3	Cyprus	Friendly	7,352

== See also ==
- Sports in Israel
