= Mohammed bin Rashid International Football Championship =

The Mohammed bin Rashid International Football Championship, also known as the Dubai Cup, was a friendly football tournament that took place in Dubai, United Arab Emirates. The competition is named after Mohammed bin Rashid Al Maktoum, Vice President and Prime Minister of the UAE and Ruler of Dubai.

The championship is an invitation-only tournament: "only clubs which are reigning or former champions of accredited national and international competitions and internationally respected for their achievements are considered". No exhibition matches are played and the tournament is conducted in strict accordance with FIFA regulations.

== Champions ==
Year	Winner	Score	Runner-up	Venue
2007; Details	(Portugal) Benfica	0–0 (5–4 pen.)	(Italy) Lazio	Dubai Sports City, Dubai (United Arab Emirates)
2008; Details	(Brazil) Internacional	2–1	(Italy) Internazionale	Dubai Sports City, Dubai (United Arab Emirates)

== Cups by team ==
- Benfica (2007) 1 time
- Internacional (2008) 1 time

== See also ==
- Dubai Challenge Cup
- Match World Cup
