= Eduard Streltsov Stadium =

Multi-purpose stadium in Moscow, Russia

Eduard Streltsov Sporting Complex (Torpedo Stadium)
- Interactive map of Eduard Streltsov Sporting Complex (Torpedo Stadium)
- Location: Moscow, Russia
- Coordinates: 55°42′59″N 37°39′23″E
- Owner: Rossium Group
- Operator: Ingrad / SSK
- Capacity: 15,076
- Surface: Grass
- Field size: 104 x 68 m
- Public transit: Avtozavodskaya; Avtozavodskaya

Construction
- Built: 1959 (originally); 2026 (current stadium)
- Opened: 1978; 48 years ago 5 September 2026; 2 months ago (current stadium)
- Renovated: 2021–2026
- Cost: 223 million USD
- Architects: Michel Rémon & Associés / TsNIIpromzdaniy

Tenant
- Torpedo Moscow

Eduard Streltsov Stadium, also known as the Torpedo Stadium, is a multi-purpose stadium in Moscow, Russia. It is currently used mostly for football matches and is the home ground of Torpedo Moscow. First built in 1959 and rebuilt between 2021 and 2026, the stadium now holds 15,076 people.

Since 1996, the stadium is named after Eduard Streltsov, a former Torpedo Moscow player and one of the most iconic Soviet footballers. Despite not being directly owned by the club, the stadium is often referred to as the "Torpedo Stadium", and it was formally re-registered as such in 2018.

== History ==
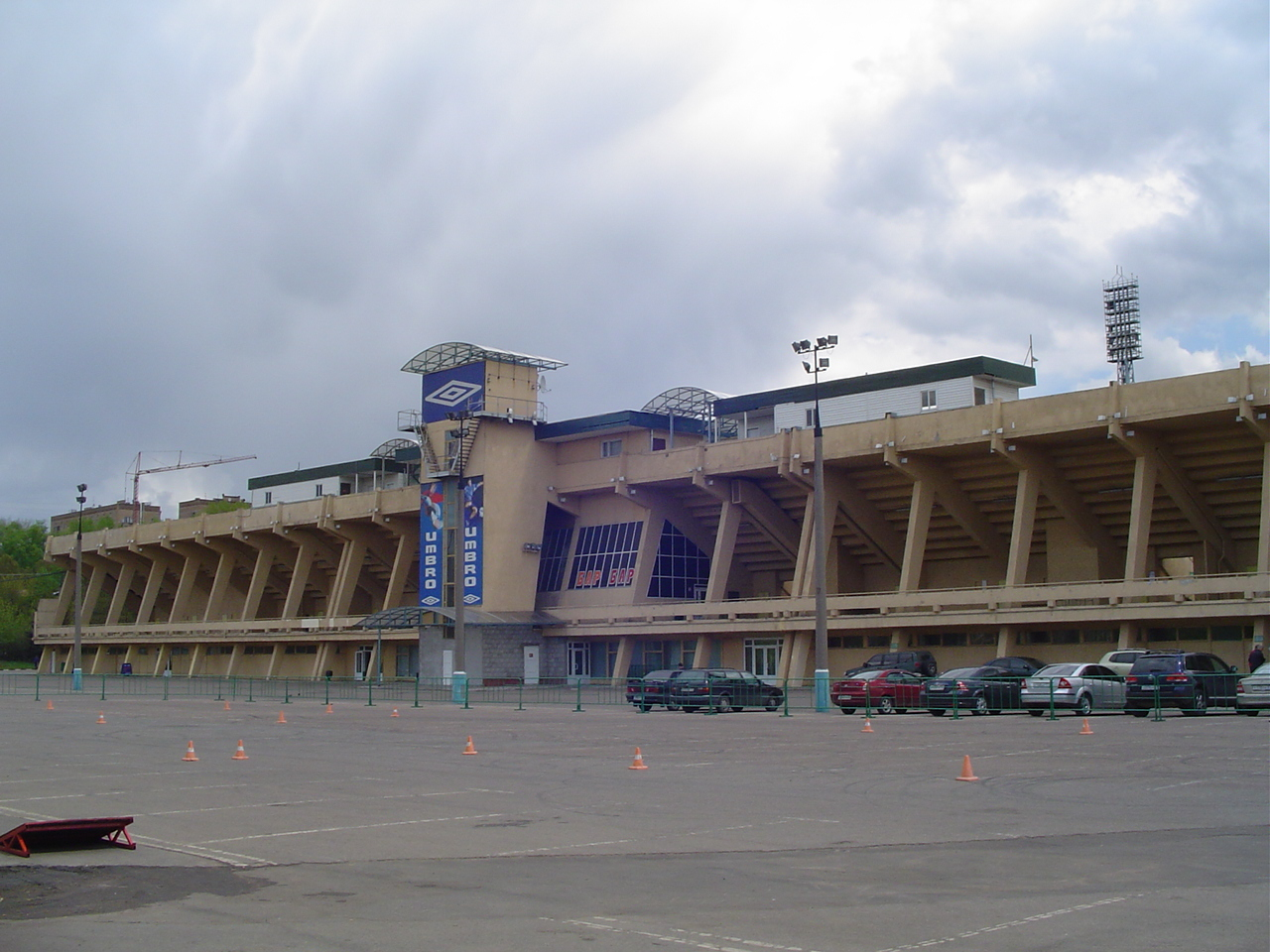
The stadium in 2007.

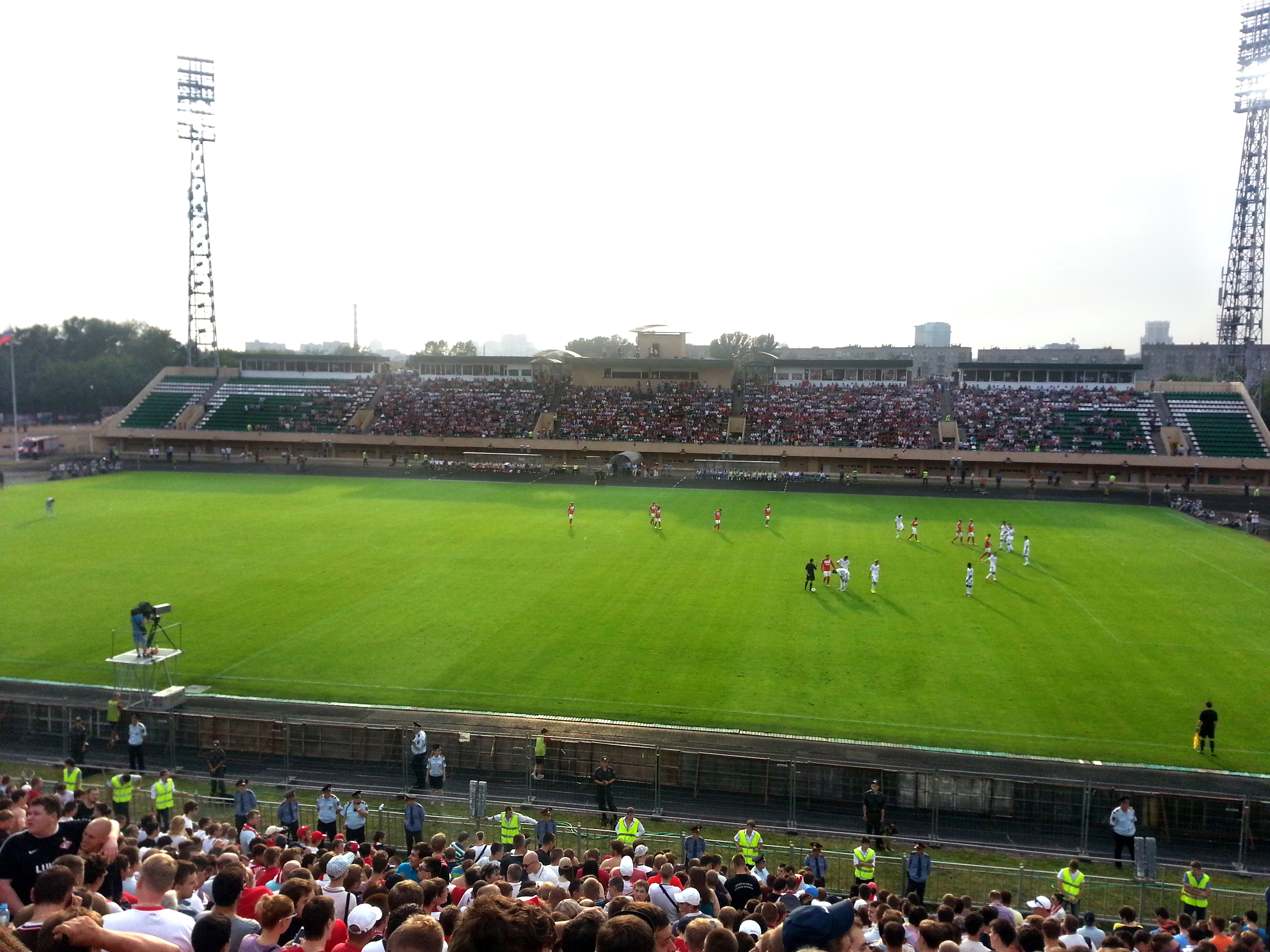
The stadium in 2013.

The Torpedo Stadium was built in 1959 and served as a training ground for the football team of the same name from the Likhachev Plant. The first match at the stadium took place on April 15, 1977, during the USSR Championship, between Torpedo and Chernomorets.

From 1978 to 1997, and again from 2010 to 2013, as well as from November 2017 onward, the stadium has been the home ground of Torpedo Moscow.

On July 21, 1997, the stadium was named in honor of Eduard Streltsov, the legendary forward of the Torpedo team. A monument to Streltsov, created by sculptor Alexander Tarasenko, was installed at the main entrance to the sports complex (unveiled on November 3, 1999).

The stadium interior in 2026.

The old stadium was demolished in 2021–2022. A new stadium was built between 2022 and 2026 and officially opened in September 2026 with a capacity of 15,076 people, up from 10,450. The new stadium is designed by two architects Michel Remon and Alexis Peyer from the French company Michel Rémon & Associés.

== Sports events ==
In 1984, the stadium hosted matches of the UEFA European Under-19 Championship.

During the 2006 FIFA U-20 Women's World Championship, the venue held group stage matches and two quarter-final fixtures.

A controversial Russian Cup Round of 32 match between Moscow clubs Torpedo and Dynamo occurred at the stadium on 26 September 2012. The game was abandoned at 2-1 in Dynamo's favor after two stoppages due to crowd disturbances ordered by the referee. Two days later, the Russian Football Union's Control and Disciplinary Committee awarded Torpedo a 0-3 technical defeat, imposed a 300,000 ruble fine on the club, and fined both teams 200,000 rubles each for fans' use of pyrotechnics. Torpedo subsequently played three home matches in the FNL league behind closed doors.

During the 2012–13 season, the stadium hosted only one Russian Premier League match, Spartak Moscow vs Alania Vladikavkaz in the 30th round on 26 May 2013.

In 2013, the stadium hosted matches of the 2013 United Tournament.
