= Spartak Moscow–Dynamo Kyiv rivalry =

International football rivalry

Soviet derby
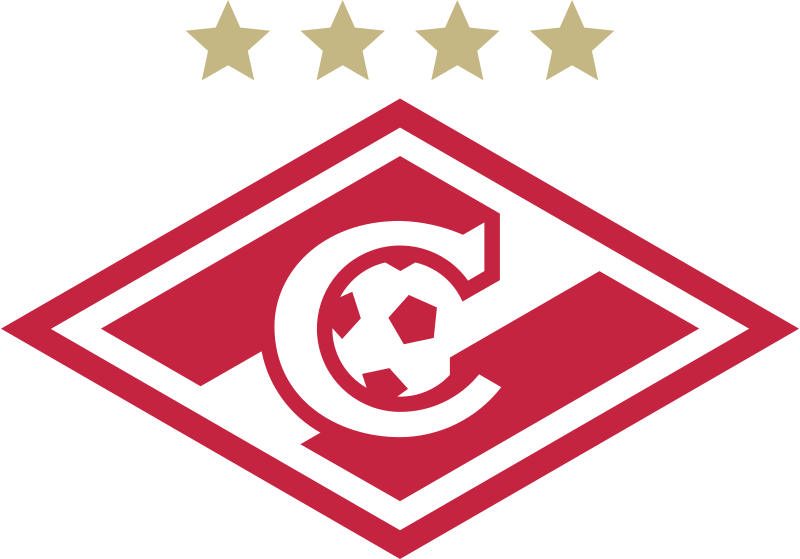
- Dynamo Kyiv Spartak Moscow
- Location: Soviet Union (former); UEFA (current)
- Teams: Dynamo Kyiv; Spartak Moscow
- First meeting: 6 June 1936; 1936 Soviet Top League; Kyiv 1–3 Spartak
- Latest meeting: 7 July 2013; 2013 United Tournament; Kyiv 2–1 Spartak
- Next meeting: TBD

Statistics
- Total meetings: 133
- Most wins: Spartak (52)
- All-time series: Kyiv: 47; Drawn: 32; Spartak: 52
- Largest victory: Spartak 5–1 Kyiv (1940)

The Spartak Moscow – Dynamo Kyiv derby is a major international football rivalry between former Soviet giants Spartak Moscow and Dynamo Kyiv that developed in the Soviet Top League.

A Spartak – Kyiv match often hosted the biggest crowd of all Soviet Top League matches, especially after the last league reorganization in 1970. The match became more popular even than the Oldest Russian derby between Dynamo Moscow and Spartak that had been the longest-running top event of the league since its establishment in 1936.

The two clubs were the most successful in the Soviet Top League, with Dynamo having won 13 titles to Spartak's 12. Spartak, however, has a better match record. As of 1 August 2008, of 132 matches Spartak have won 60 and lost 48.

The contest emerged as a derby in 1976, when Dynamo beat Spartak, relegating them from the top flight.

Besides the football competition, the derby has some political background in Russian-Ukrainian relations. This has been especially marked since 1991 when Ukraine became an independent state with its own football league. Russian clubs have been suspended from international play since 2022 due to Russia's invasion of Ukraine, leaving the rivalry currently defunct.

== Head to head record ==
Competition	Played	Spartak	Draw	Dynamo
Soviet League	102	41	27	34
Soviet Cup	15	9	2	4
Champions League	4	1	0	3
CIS Cup	5	1	1	3
Friendly	5	0	2	3
Totals	133	52	32	47

=== Records ===
- Largest scores by Spartak: 5–1 (1940); 4–0 (1955, 1958).
- Largest scores by Dynamo: 4–1 (1950, 1966, 1972, 2008 [twice]); 3–0 (1968, 1978, 2008).
- Most goals scored in a single match: 7 (4–3) (1957)

=== Streaks ===
Longest Spartak winning streaks

- 12 June 1941 – 23 June 1946: 5 (4 league + 1 cup match).
- 1 October 1951 – 16 April 1954: 5 (4 league + 1 cup match).
- 20 September 1987 – 23 October 1989: 5 (all league).

Longest Spartak lossless streak

- 18 October 1937 – 15 August 1950: 14 wins + 9 ties in 18 league + 5 cup matches.

Longest Dynamo winning streak

- 22 August 1975 – 15 October 1978: 6 (all league).

Longest Dynamo lossless streak

- 27 April 1964 – 12 October 1968: 9 wins + 5 ties in 14 league + 4 cup matches.

=== All official matches ===
Date	Tournament	Home	Away	Score
6 June 1936	Soviet League	Dynamo Kyiv	FC Spartak Moscow	1–3
18 October 1936	Soviet League	Spartak Moscow	Dynamo Kyiv	3–3
17 August 1937	Soviet League	Spartak Moscow	Dynamo Kyiv	1–2
18 October 1937	Soviet League	Dynamo Kyiv	Spartak Moscow	1–1
29 May 1938	Soviet League	Spartak Moscow	Dynamo Kyiv	1–1
12 July 1939	Soviet League	Spartak Moscow	Dynamo Kyiv	3–1
12 October 1939	Soviet League	Dynamo Kyiv	Spartak Moscow	2–2
1 July 1940	Soviet League	Spartak Moscow	Dynamo Kyiv	5–1
8 November 1940	Soviet League	Dynamo Kyiv	Spartak Moscow	2–2
12 June 1941	Soviet League	Spartak Moscow	Dynamo Kyiv	3–0
6 August 1944	Soviet Cup 1/8 finals	Dynamo Kyiv	Spartak Moscow	1–2
24 June 1945	Soviet League	Dynamo Kyiv	Spartak Moscow	1–2
29 August 1945	Soviet League	Spartak Moscow	Dynamo Kyiv	1–0
23 June 1946	Soviet League	Dynamo Kyiv	Spartak Moscow	1–2
18 July 1946	Soviet League	Spartak Moscow	Dynamo Kyiv	2–2
16 October 1946	Soviet Cup 1/2 finals	Spartak Moscow	Dynamo Kyiv	3–1
20 June 1947	Soviet League	Spartak Moscow	Dynamo Kyiv	0–0
10 July 1947	Soviet Cup 1/4 finals	Spartak Moscow	Dynamo Kyiv	2–0
19 September 1947	Soviet League	Dynamo Kyiv	Spartak Moscow	0–0
11 June 1948	Soviet League	Dynamo Kyiv	Spartak Moscow	0–2
8 September 1948	Soviet League	Spartak Moscow	Dynamo Kyiv	1–0
7 October 1948	Soviet Cup 1/4 finals	Spartak Moscow	Dynamo Kyiv	1–0
25 April 1949	Soviet League	Dynamo Kyiv	Spartak Moscow	0–0
26 July 1949	Soviet League	Spartak Moscow	Dynamo Kyiv	3–0
20 October 1949	Soviet Cup 1/8 finals	Spartak Moscow	Dynamo Kyiv	4–1
27 April 1950	Soviet League	Dynamo Kyiv	Spartak Moscow	0–0
15 August 1950	Soviet League	Spartak Moscow	Dynamo Kyiv	1–4
22 April 1951	Soviet League	Dynamo Kyiv	Spartak Moscow	1–0
6 July 1951	Soviet League	Spartak Moscow	Dynamo Kyiv	0–0
30 September 1951	Soviet Cup 1/8 finals	Spartak Moscow	Dynamo Kyiv	1–0
11 August 1952	Soviet League	Spartak Moscow	Dynamo Kyiv	4–1
22 May 1953	Soviet League	Spartak Moscow	Dynamo Kyiv	3–1
30 July 1953	Soviet League	Dynamo Kyiv	Spartak Moscow	0–2
16 April 1954	Soviet League	Dynamo Kyiv	Spartak Moscow	2–4
30 September 1954	Soviet League	Spartak Moscow	Dynamo Kyiv	1–1
3 October 1954	Soviet Cup 1/8 finals	Spartak Moscow	Dynamo Kyiv	1–3
10 April 1955	Soviet League	Dynamo Kyiv	Spartak Moscow	0–0
26 August 1955	Soviet League	Spartak Moscow	Dynamo Kyiv	4–0
25 April 1956	Soviet League	Dynamo Kyiv	Spartak Moscow	1–1
14 October 1956	Soviet League	Spartak Moscow	Dynamo Kyiv	4–3
21 April 1957	Soviet League	Dynamo Kyiv	Spartak Moscow	2–1
5 December 1957	Soviet League	Spartak Moscow	Dynamo Kyiv	3–2 (Note: played on a neutral field in Tbilisi.)
29 March 1958	Soviet League	Dynamo Kyiv	Spartak Moscow	1–1
22 August 1958	Soviet League	Spartak Moscow	Dynamo Kyiv	3–2 (Note: protested and subsequently replayed.)
6 October 1958	Soviet Cup 1/8 finals	Dynamo Kyiv	Spartak Moscow	0–4
8 November 1958	Soviet League	Spartak Moscow	Dynamo Kyiv	3–2
5 July 1959	Soviet League	Spartak Moscow	Dynamo Kyiv	0–1
15 August 1959	Soviet League	Dynamo Kyiv	Spartak Moscow	2–2
27 April 1960	Soviet League	Spartak Moscow	Dynamo Kyiv	0–1
7 July 1960	Soviet League	Dynamo Kyiv	Spartak Moscow	3–3
14 May 1961	Soviet League	Spartak Moscow	Dynamo Kyiv	2–0
8 July 1961	Soviet League	Dynamo Kyiv	Spartak Moscow	2–0
23 October 1962	Soviet League	Spartak Moscow	Dynamo Kyiv	2–1
18 November 1962	Soviet League	Dynamo Kyiv	Spartak Moscow	0–2
10 April 1963	Soviet League	Dynamo Kyiv	Spartak Moscow	2–1
28 June 1963	Soviet Cup 1/8 finals	Spartak Moscow	Dynamo Kyiv	1–0
14 September 1963	Soviet League	Spartak Moscow	Dynamo Kyiv	3–1
27 April 1964	Soviet League	Spartak Moscow	Dynamo Kyiv	1–1
8 September 1964	Soviet Cup 1/2 finals	Spartak Moscow	Dynamo Kyiv	0–0
9 September 1964	Soviet Cup 1/2 finals	Spartak Moscow	Dynamo Kyiv	2–3
12 September 1964	Soviet League	Dynamo Kyiv	Spartak Moscow	2–2
30 June 1965	Soviet League	Dynamo Kyiv	Spartak Moscow	0–0
28 August 1965	Soviet League	Spartak Moscow	Dynamo Kyiv	0–2
1 June 1966	Soviet League	Dynamo Kyiv	Spartak Moscow	1–0
16 September 1966	Soviet Cup 1/4 finals	Dynamo Kyiv	Spartak Moscow	4–1
20 September 1966	Soviet League	Spartak Moscow	Dynamo Kyiv	0–1
12 April 1967	Soviet League	Dynamo Kyiv	Spartak Moscow	1–0
4 November 1967	Soviet League	Spartak Moscow	Dynamo Kyiv	0–2
14 June 1968	Soviet League	Spartak Moscow	Dynamo Kyiv	3–3
28 June 1968	Soviet Cup 1/16 finals	Dynamo Kyiv	Spartak Moscow	3–0
12 October 1968	Soviet League	Dynamo Kyiv	Spartak Moscow	1–0
23 August 1969	Soviet League	Spartak Moscow	Dynamo Kyiv	2–1
30 October 1969	Soviet League	Dynamo Kyiv	Spartak Moscow	0–1
18 April 1970	Soviet League	Spartak Moscow	Dynamo Kyiv	0–0
13 August 1970	Soviet League	Dynamo Kyiv	Spartak Moscow	0–1
20 May 1971	Soviet League	Spartak Moscow	Dynamo Kyiv	0–2
15 August 1971	Soviet League	Dynamo Kyiv	Spartak Moscow	3–2
15 May 1972	Soviet League	Spartak Moscow	Dynamo Kyiv	1–1
1 August 1972	Soviet League	Dynamo Kyiv	Spartak Moscow	4–1
2 May 1973	Soviet League	Dynamo Kyiv	Spartak Moscow	1–1 (3–2 pen.)
25 August 1973	Soviet League	Spartak Moscow	Dynamo Kyiv	2–1
23 May 1974	Soviet League	Dynamo Kyiv	Spartak Moscow	1–0
20 August 1974	Soviet League	Spartak Moscow	Dynamo Kyiv	2–0
22 August 1975	Soviet League	Spartak Moscow	Dynamo Kyiv	0–1
8 November 1975	Soviet League	Dynamo Kyiv	Spartak Moscow	3–1
18 April 1976	Soviet League	Spartak Moscow	Dynamo Kyiv	0–1
12 November 1976	Soviet League	Dynamo Kyiv	Spartak Moscow	3–1
28 April 1978	Soviet League	Dynamo Kyiv	Spartak Moscow	3–0
15 October 1978	Soviet League	Spartak Moscow	Dynamo Kyiv	0–2
2 May 1979	Soviet League	Spartak Moscow	Dynamo Kyiv	1–0
28 September 1979	Soviet League	Dynamo Kyiv	Spartak Moscow	0–2
16 June 1980	Soviet League	Spartak Moscow	Dynamo Kyiv	1–0
31 October 1980	Soviet League	Dynamo Kyiv	Spartak Moscow	2–0
22 March 1981	Soviet Cup 1/4 finals	Spartak Moscow	Dynamo Kyiv	3–0
14 June 1981	Soviet League	Dynamo Kyiv	Spartak Moscow	2–0
11 November 1981	Soviet League	Spartak Moscow	Dynamo Kyiv	1–2
27 July 1982	Soviet League	Spartak Moscow	Dynamo Kyiv	1–2
8 November 1982	Soviet League	Dynamo Kyiv	Spartak Moscow	1–2
11 June 1983	Soviet League	Dynamo Kyiv	Spartak Moscow	1–1
1 September 1983	Soviet League	Spartak Moscow	Dynamo Kyiv	0–0
23 June 1984	Soviet League	Dynamo Kyiv	Spartak Moscow	0–3
20 July 1984	Soviet League	Spartak Moscow	Dynamo Kyiv	3–1
28 May 1985	Soviet League	Dynamo Kyiv	Spartak Moscow	2–0
13 September 1985	Soviet Cup 1/8 finals	Spartak Moscow	Dynamo Kyiv	3–3 (4–3 pen.)
19 October 1985	Soviet League	Spartak Moscow	Dynamo Kyiv	1–2
27 April 1986	Soviet League	Dynamo Kyiv	Spartak Moscow	2–1
12 July 1986	Soviet League	Spartak Moscow	Dynamo Kyiv	1–0
10 May 1987	Soviet League	Spartak Moscow	Dynamo Kyiv	0–0
20 September 1987	Soviet League	Dynamo Kyiv	Spartak Moscow	0–1
27 March 1988	Soviet League	Dynamo Kyiv	Spartak Moscow	1–2
22 October 1988	Soviet League	Spartak Moscow	Dynamo Kyiv	1–0
15 April 1989	Soviet League	Dynamo Kyiv	Spartak Moscow	1–4
23 October 1989	Soviet League	Spartak Moscow	Dynamo Kyiv	2–1
6 May 1990	Soviet League	Spartak Moscow	Dynamo Kyiv	1–3
1 September 1990	Soviet League	Dynamo Kyiv	Spartak Moscow	3–1
1 June 1991	Soviet League	Spartak Moscow	Dynamo Kyiv	0–2
26 June 1991	Soviet League	Dynamo Kyiv	Spartak Moscow	2–3
14 September 1994	UEFA Champions League	Dynamo Kyiv	Spartak Moscow	3–2
23 November 1994	UEFA Champions League	Spartak Moscow	Dynamo Kyiv	1–0
2 February 1997	CIS Cup	Spartak Moscow	Dynamo Kyiv	2–3
1 February 1998	CIS Cup	Spartak Moscow	Dynamo Kyiv	0–1
29 January 1999	CIS Cup	Spartak Moscow	Dynamo Kyiv	0–0
31 January 1999	CIS Cup	Spartak Moscow	Dynamo Kyiv	2–1
27 January 2002	CIS Cup	Spartak Moscow	Dynamo Kyiv	3–4
13 August 2008	UEFA Champions League	Spartak Moscow	Dynamo Kyiv	1–4
27 August 2008	UEFA Champions League	Dynamo Kyiv	Spartak Moscow	4–1
27 June 2013	United Supercup	Spartak Moscow	Dynamo Kyiv	0–1
7 July 2013	United Supercup	Dynamo Kyiv	Spartak Moscow	2–1

=== Soviet Cup ===
#	Season	Date	Round	Home team	Score	Away team	Kyiv scorers	Moscow scorers
1	1944	Second round	6 August 1944	Kyiv	1 – 2	Moscow	Konstantin Kalach (61)	Nikolai Klimov (18, 117)
2	1946	Semi-finals	16 October 1946	Moscow	3 – 1	Kyiv	Anatoliy Gorokhov (67)	Oleg Timakov (25), Boris Smyslov (75), Ivan Konov (88)
3	1947	Quarter-finals	10 July 1947	Moscow	2 – 0	Kyiv		Sergei Salnikov (25, 55)
4	1948	Quarter-finals	7 October 1948	Moscow	1 – 0	Kyiv		Aleksei Paramonov (55)
5	1949	Third round	20 October 1949	Moscow	4 – 1	Kyiv	Mykhaylo Mykhalyna (22)	Sergei Salnikov (12, 61), Nikita Simonyan (48), Viktor Terentiev (72)
6	1951	Fourth round	30 September 1951	Moscow	1 – 0	Kyiv		Aleksei Paramonov (66)
7	1954	Fourth round	3 October 1954	Moscow	1 – 3	Kyiv	Mykhaylo Koman (41, 73), Andrei Zazroyev (51)	Anatoli Isayev (26)
8	1958	First round (final stage)	6 October 1958	Kyiv	0 – 4	Moscow		Anatoli Ilyin (17), Anatoli Isayev (32), Nikita Simonyan (34), Igor Netto (85)
9	1963	Third round (final stage)	28 June 1963	Moscow	1 – 0	Kyiv		Galimzyan Khusainov (8)
10	1964	Semi-finals	8 September 1964	Moscow	0 – 0	Kyiv		
11	1964	Semi-finals (Replay)	9 September 1964	Moscow	2 – 3	Kyiv	Oleh Bazylevych (43, 56), Viktor Serebryanikov (58)	Galimzyan Husainov (14), Igor Netto (64)
12	1965–66	Quarter-finals	16 September 1966	Kyiv	4 – 0	Moscow	Yozhef Sabo (32 p., 81), Anatoliy Byshovets (49, 57)	Galimzyan Khusainov (82)
13	1967–68	Fourth round (final stage)	28 June 1968	Kyiv	3 – 0	Moscow	Vitaliy Khmelnytskyi (22) Yozhef Sabo (62, 86)	
14	1981	Quarter-finals	22 March 1981	Moscow	3 – 0	Moscow		Fyodor Cherenkov (22), Yevgeni Sidorov (28, 36)
15	1985–86	Round of 16	13 September 1985	Moscow	3 – 3 (Note: Spartak Moscow won 4–3 on penalties.)	Kyiv	Anatoliy Demyanenko (4), Pavlo Yakovenko (57), Igor Belanov (97)	Fyodor Cherenkov (34 p., 35), Sergey Rodionov (93)

=== CIS/United Tournament ===
#	Season	Date	Round	Home team	Score	Away team	Kyiv scorers	Moscow scorers
1	1997	Final	3 February 1997	Kyiv	3 – 2	Moscow	Valyantsin Byalkevich (49, 85), Andriy Shevchenko (51 p.)	Yegor Titov (21), Andrey Tikhonov (81 p.)
2	1998	Final	1 February 1998	Kyiv	1 – 0	Moscow	Kakha Kaladze (46)	
3	1999	Semi-finals (group stage)	29 January 1999	Kyiv	0 – 0	Moscow		
4	1999	Final	31 January 1999	Moscow	2 – 1	Kyiv	Valyantsin Byalkevich (48)	Aleksei Melyoshin (61), Yegor Titov (89)
5	2002	Final	27 January 2002	Moscow	3 – 4	Kyiv	Alyaksandr Khatskevich (7), Georgi Peev (45+2), Valyantsin Byalkevich (63), Lucky Idahor (85)	Eduard Tsykhmeystruk (4), Aleksandr Danishevsky (45), Dmitri Sychev (86)
6	2013	Group stage	27 June 2013	Moscow	0 – 1	Kyiv	Oleh Husyev (31 p.)	
7	2013	Group stage	7 July 2013	Kyiv	2 – 1	Moscow	Jeremain Lens (15), Oleh Husyev (61)	Juan Insaurralde (90+2)

=== Major honours ===
Spartak Moscow	Competition	Dynamo Kyiv
Domestic (Soviet era)
12	Soviet Top League	13
10	Soviet Cup	9
0	USSR Super Cup	3
1	USSR Federation Cup	0
0	Other	9
Domestic (Post Soviet era)
6	CIS Cup	4
10	Russian / Ukrainian Premier League	16
3	Russian / Ukrainian Cup	13
1	Russian / Ukrainian Super Cup	9
Continental
0	UEFA Cup Winners' Cup	2
0	UEFA Super Cup	1
43	Total	79

- Other includes Football Cup of the Ukrainian SSR and Football Championship of the Ukrainian SSR.
