= Dubai Challenge Cup =

Friendly football tournament

Dubai Challenge Cup, also known as the Dubai Football Challenge, is a friendly football tournament founded by Mohammed bin Rashed and the United Arab Emirates national football team. It was first held in January 2007, with another tournament scheduled for January 2008, with both won by German side Hamburger SV.

== 2007 tournament ==
The 2007 Dubai Challenge Cup was played in January 2007 by four teams: United Arab Emirates, Iran, Hamburger SV and VfB Stuttgart.

=== Group classification ===
Team	Pld	W	D	L	GF	GA	GD	Pts
(Germany) Hamburger SV	2	2	0	0	3	1	+2	9
Iran	2	1	0	1	2	2	0	5
United Arab Emirates	2	1	0	1	2	2	0	5
(Germany) Stuttgart	2	0	0	2	1	3	-2	0

=== Group matches ===
2007-01-09

United Arab Emirates	2–1	(Germany) Stuttgart
Omar; Matar		Gómez

2007-01-09

Hamburger SV (Germany)	2–1	Iran
Guerrero; Besart		Khatibi

2007-01-11

Iran	1–0	(Germany) Stuttgart
Rajabzadeh

2007-01-11

United Arab Emirates	0–1	(Germany) Hamburger SV
		Benjamin

=== Champion ===
Dubai Challenge Cup
2007 Winners

Hamburger SV
First Title

== 2008 tournament ==
The 2008 Dubai Challenge Cup was played in January 2008 by four teams: United Arab Emirates, China PR, Hamburger SV and Vasco da Gama.

=== Group classification ===
Team	Pld	W	D	L	GF	GA	GD	Pts
(Germany) Hamburger SV	2	2	0	0	6	1	+5	6
(Brazil) Vasco da Gama	2	1	0	1	2	2	0	3
United Arab Emirates	2	0	1	1	0	1	-1	1
China	2	0	1	1	0	4	-4	1

=== Group matches ===
2008-01-10

Hamburger SV (Germany)	2–1	(Brazil) Vasco da Gama
Jarolím 28'; De Jong 69'		Mathijsen 33' (o.g.)

2008-01-10

United Arab Emirates	0–0	China

2008-01-12

Hamburger SV (Germany)	4–0	China
Van der Vaart 44', 53'; Castelen 58'; Guerrero 75'

2008-01-12

Vasco da Gama (Brazil)	1–0	United Arab Emirates
Alan Kardec 79'

=== Champion ===
Dubai Challenge Cup
2008 Winners

Hamburger SV
Second Title

== 2009 tournament ==
The 2009 Dubai Challenge Cup was played on 6 January 2009 by Milan and Hamburger SV in a single match.

=== Match ===
2009-01-06

Milan (Italy)	1–1	(Germany) Hamburger SV
Ronaldinho 62' (pen.)		Benjamin 66'
Penalties
Ronaldinho (penalty scored); Shevchenko (penalty scored); Inzaghi (penalty scored); Emerson (penalty missed); Flamini (penalty scored)	4–3	(penalty scored) Petrić; (penalty missed) Thiago Neves; (penalty scored) Olić; (penalty missed) Aogo; (penalty scored) Demel

=== Champion ===
Dubai Challenge Cup
2009 Winners

Milan
First Title

== 2011 tournament ==
The 2011 Dubai Challenge Cup was played at 2 January 2011 by Al-Ahli and Milan in a single match.

=== Match ===
2 January 2011

Al-Ahli (United Arab Emirates)	1–2	(Italy) Milan
Hasan 85'		Seedorf 38'; Beretta 72'

Al-Rashid Stadium, Dubai

=== Champion ===
Dubai Challenge Cup
2011 Winners

Milan
Second Title

== 2012 tournament ==
The 2012 Dubai Challenge Cup was played at 4 January 2012 by Milan and Paris Saint-Germain in a single match.

=== Match ===
4 January 2012

Milan (Italy)	1–0	(France) Paris Saint-Germain
Pato 4'

Al-Rashid Stadium, Dubai

=== Champion ===
Dubai Challenge Cup
2012 Winners

Milan
Third Title

== 2014 tournament ==
The 2014 Dubai Challenge Cup was played at 30 December 2014 by Real Madrid and Milan in a single match.

=== 2014 match ===
30 December 2014

Real Madrid (Spain)	2–4	(Italy) Milan
Ronaldo 35'; Benzema 84' (pen.)	Report	Ménez 24'; El Shaarawy 31', 48'; Pazzini 73'

The Sevens Stadium, Dubai
Attendance: 42,000
Referee: Muhammad Abdullah (United Arab Emirates)

=== 2014 champion ===
Dubai Challenge Cup
2014 Winners

Milan
Fourth Title

== 2024 tournament ==
The 2024 Dubai Challenge Cup was played in January 2024 by four teams: Al Ahli, Raja, Wuhan Three Towns and Zamalek.

=== Bracket ===
Semi-finals
Raja	2 (2)
Zamalek (p)	2 (4)
Al Ahli	3
Wuhan	1

Final
Al Ahli	0
Zamalek	3
Third place play-off
Raja	1
Wuhan	0

=== Semi-finals ===
26 January 2024

(Morocco) Raja	2–2 (a.e.t.)	(Egypt) Zamalek
Bouzok 68' (pen.); Zerhouni 89' (pen.)		2' El Wensh; 6' Shikabala
Penalties
Mokadem (penalty missed); Ennaffati (penalty scored); Zrida (penalty scored); Bouzok (penalty missed)	2–4	(penalty scored) Mathlouthi; (penalty scored) Roqa; (penalty scored) Gaber; (penalty scored) Mansi

27 January 2024

Al Ahli (Saudi Arabia)	3–1	(China) Wuhan Three Towns
Al Nabit 10'; Viega 69'; Al Rashidi 78'		6' Zhang

=== Third place play-off ===
28 January 2024

(Morocco) Raja	1–0	(China) Wuhan Three Towns
Maouhoub 28' (pen.)

=== Final ===
28 January 2024

(Saudi Arabia) Al Ahli	0–3	(Egypt) Zamalek
		31' Shikabala; 48' Obama; 88' Yasser

=== Champion ===
Dubai Challenge Cup
2024 Winners

Zamalek
First Title

== Cups by team ==
- Milan (2009, 2011, 2012 and 2014) 4 times
- Hamburger SV (2007 and 2008) 2 times
- Zamalek (2024) 1 time

== See also ==
- Dubai Cup
- Match World Cup
