= United Tournament =

- Founded: 2013
- Region: Russia and Ukraine (UEFA)
- Teams: 4
- Current champions: (Ukraine) Shakhtar Donetsk

The United Tournament or United Supercup was an exhibition football club tournament between two best clubs from Ukraine and two from Russia. The context of the tournament were the talks which are held regarding creating the United CIS championship, or joint Russia–Ukraine league. The organisers of the tournament were the same people in charge of drafting a proposal for the united league. (two-legged ties for all pairs of clubs from different countries,), but at the second edition it was changed to a round-robin.

In 2014, the War in Donbas and conflict between Russia and Ukraine put the idea to create a united tournament between the nations on halt.

== History ==
The idea of a tournament between the top teams of Russia and Ukraine was already tried in the past as the United Tournament was called by many an incarnation of the original tournament (including the original format). The context of the tournament was talks which were held regarding creating the United CIS championship, or joint Russia–Ukraine league. The organisers of the tournament were the same people in charge of drafting a proposal for the united league.

On 22 January 2013, the Super Cup of Champions took place in the United Arab Emirates between the winner of the Ukrainian Premier League, Shakhtar Donetsk, and Russian Premier League, Zenit St. Petersburg. The trophy was won by Shakhtar Donetsk who beat Zenit St. Petersburg with a 3–1 score.

22 January 2013
17:00 UTC+4

Zenit St. Petersburg (Russia)	1–3	(Ukraine) FC Shakhtar Donetsk
Zyryanov 35'	Stats; Live Text; Report	Mkhitaryan 21', 39'; Eduardo 79'

Zabeel Stadium, Dubai (UAE)
Attendance: 300 or 1,500
Referee: Bader Abdullah (UAE)

=== 2013 ===
The first edition of the tournament, 2013 United Tournament, took place between 27 June – 7 July 2013 and included Shakhtar Donetsk and Dynamo Kyiv from Ukraine; Zenit Saint Petersburg and FC Spartak Moscow from Russia. The format of the tournament was two-legged ties for all pairs of clubs from different countries. The host cities were Donetsk, Kyiv and Moscow. Dynamo Kyiv won the 2013 United Tournament, after beating Spartak Moscow in the last game.

=== 2014 ===
The second edition, 2014 United Supercup, took place in Israel between 30 January – 5 February 2014. Four teams participated in it: Shakhtar Donetsk and Metalist Kharkiv from Ukraine; Zenit St. Petersburg and CSKA Moscow from Russia. The clubs were picked by the principle of two top placed clubs in the local championships. G-Drive became the edition official sponsor. Before the tournament a press conference was held in Tel Aviv. Among the participants were Valery Gazzaev, the head of the committee in charge of the united championship, Mircea Lucescu, the manager of Shakhtar Donetsk, Leonid Slutskiy, the manager of PFC CSKA Moscow, Myron Markevych, the manager of Metallist Kharkiv, and Luciano Spalletti, the manager of FC Zenit Saint Petersburg. The tournament format became round-robin (instead of two-legged ties for all pairs of clubs from different countries, as played previously). The first two games of the tournament were watched by 3 million Russians, which is 1 million more than the previous edition average. The 2014 tournament was won by Shakhtar Donetsk from Ukraine, winning all 3 games. Dario Srna was named the best player of the tournament.

== Results ==
Name	Winner	Runner-up	Third	Fourth	Date	Venues
2013 United Tournament	(Ukraine) Dynamo Kyiv	(Russia) Spartak Moscow	(Russia) Zenit St. Petersburg	(Ukraine) Shakhtar Donetsk	27 June – 7 July 2013	(Ukraine) Donetsk and Kyiv
2013 United Tournament	(Ukraine) Dynamo Kyiv	(Russia) Spartak Moscow	(Russia) Zenit St. Petersburg	(Ukraine) Shakhtar Donetsk	27 June – 7 July 2013	(Russia) Moscow
2014 United Supercup	(Ukraine) Shakhtar Donetsk	(Ukraine) Metallist Kharkiv	(Russia) Zenit St. Petersburg	(Russia) CSKA Moscow	30 January – 5 February 2014	(Israel) Petah Tikva

== Performances by country ==
Country	Winners	Runners-up	Winning clubs
Ukraine	2	1	Dynamo Kyiv (1), Shakhtar Donetsk (1)
Russia	0	1	

== See also ==
- Channel One Cup
- Matchworld Cup
- Russian Super Cup
- Ukrainian Super Cup
- CIS Super League
