= Douglas Costa =

Brazilian footballer (born 1990)

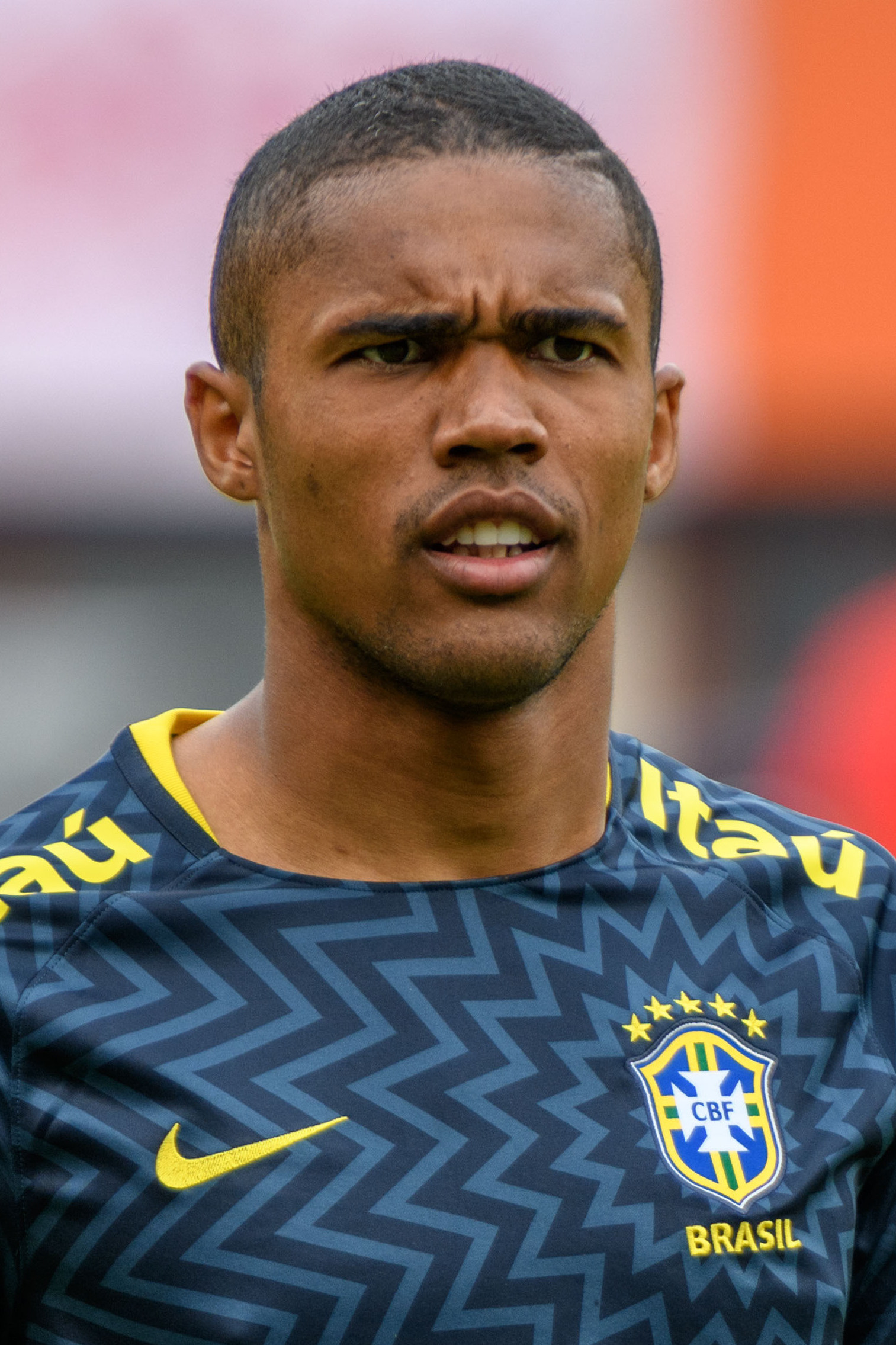
- Costa with Brazil in 2018

Personal information
- Full name: Douglas Costa de Souza
- Date of birth: 14 September 1990 (age 36)
- Place of birth: Sapucaia do Sul, Brazil
- Height: 1.72 m (5 ft 8 in)
- Position: Winger

Team information
- Current team: Al-Ittifaq
- Number: 10

Youth career
- 2001–2002: Novo Hamburgo
- 2002–2008: Grêmio

Senior career*
Years	Team	Apps	(Gls)
2008–2010	Grêmio	35	(2)
2010–2015	Shakhtar Donetsk	141	(29)
2015–2018	Bayern Munich	50	(8)
2017–2018	→ Juventus (loan)	31	(4)
2018–2022	Juventus	42	(2)
2020–2021	→ Bayern Munich (loan)	11	(1)
2021–2022	→ Grêmio (loan)	26	(3)
2022	→ LA Galaxy (loan)	13	(2)
2022–2023	LA Galaxy	33	(5)
2024	Fluminense	15	(0)
2024–2025	Sydney FC	16	(4)
2026	ChievoVerona	11	(0)
2026–	Al-Ittifaq	0	(0)

International career
2009	Brazil U20	12	(4)
2014–2018	Brazil	31	(3)
Medal record
Representing Brazil
Men's Football
FIFA U-20 World Cup
Runner-up	2009 Egypt
South American U-20 Championship
Winner	2009 Venezuela
- * Club domestic league appearances and goals as of 3 May 2026

Douglas Costa de Souza (born 14 September 1990) is a Brazilian professional footballer who plays as a winger for UAE First Division League club Al-Ittifaq.

Costa started his career with Grêmio before moving to Shakhtar Donetsk in January 2010 for a fee of €6 million. He won numerous trophies with Shakhtar, including a domestic treble in the 2010–11 season (Premier League, the Ukrainian Cup and the Super Cup). In 2015, Costa joined Bayern Munich for €30 million, where he won two consecutive league titles. He was loaned out to Juventus in 2017, and won a domestic double with the club in his first season. In June 2018, Juventus made his loan move permanent. He added another two consecutive league titles in his next two seasons with the club, as well as a Supercoppa Italiana title. On deadline day of the 2020 summer transfer window, Costa returned to Bayern Munich on loan.

A full international since 2014, Costa represented Brazil at the 2015 Copa América and the 2018 FIFA World Cup.

== Club career ==
=== Grêmio ===
Born in Sapucaia do Sul, Rio Grande do Sul, Douglas began his career with Grêmio, joining the club at the age of 11. He made his debut for the club at the age of 18 in a 2–1 victory over Botafogo on 4 October 2008, scoring his first goal for the club in the same match. He completed the 2008 season with one goal in six matches. On 14 June 2009 he was given a red card in a 0–0 draw with Fluminense. On 29 November 2009, he netted the first goal in a 4–2 victory over Grêmio Recreativo Barueri.

He joined Ukrainian side Shakhtar Donetsk on 10 January 2010. He made 37 appearances for Grêmio, including 28 league appearances, scoring twice.

=== Shakhtar Donetsk ===
==== 2009–10 season ====
On 10 January 2010, Costa signed a five-year contract with Shakhtar Donetsk in a deal worth €6 million. His debut came in a UEFA Europa League tie against English side Fulham on 18 February which Shakhtar lost 2–1. He came on as a substitute in the 75th minute, replacing Jádson. His home debut came in the return leg on 25 February; he came on as 53rd-minute replacement for Willian, assisting Jádson for Shakhtar's equaliser in a 1–1 draw. Shakhtar lost the tie 3–2 on aggregate. He scored his first goal for the club in a 2–1 win against Metalist Kharkiv on 14 March 2010. On 28 March, he scored a goal in injury time in a 3–1 victory against Arsenal Kyiv, then scored a goal in a 3–0 victory over Chornomorets Odesa on 25 April. On 1 May, Costa scored a late goal in Shakhtar's 2–0 win against Metalurh Zaporizhya. He scored Shakhtar's third goal in a 3–2 victory over Tavriya Simferopol on 9 May.

In his first season with Shakhtar, Douglas made 15 appearances, including 13 league appearances, scoring five goals, all of which came in the league. Shakhtar won the 2009–10 Premier League title, Costa's first trophy with the club.

==== 2010–11 season ====
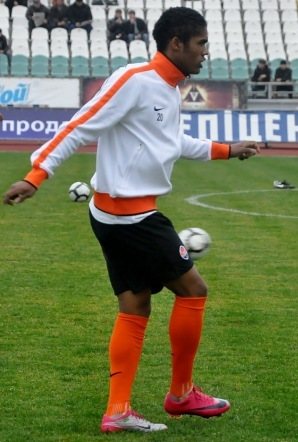
Costa in training with Shakhtar Donetsk in 2010

Costa's first appearance in the 2010–11 season came in the 7–1 Super Cup win against Tavriya on 4 July. On 30 July, he netted a brace in a 3–1 victory against Arsenal Kyiv. He scored the fourth goal in Shakhtar's 5–0 victory over PFC Sevastopol. On 28 September, he scored a penalty, and assisted two Luiz Adriano goals in a 3–0 UEFA Champions League victory over Portuguese club Braga. On 28 September, he scored a penalty in a 4–0 win against Arsenal Kyiv. On 16 February, he netted the second goal, and assisted the third for Luiz Adriano, in a 3–2 victory over Roma. Shakhtar won the tie 6–2 on aggregate. On 1 April, he scored a late goal in a 3–1 victory over Illichivets Mariupol. He came on as a 95th-minute substitute in Shakhtar's 2–0 Ukrainian Cup Final victory over Dynamo Kyiv on 25 May.

Shakhtar managed to end the season as treble winners, winning the Premier League, Ukrainian Cup and the Super Cup. Costa made a total of 39 appearances for the club, scoring seven goals. Twenty-seven of the appearances and five of the goals came in the league.

==== 2011–12 season ====
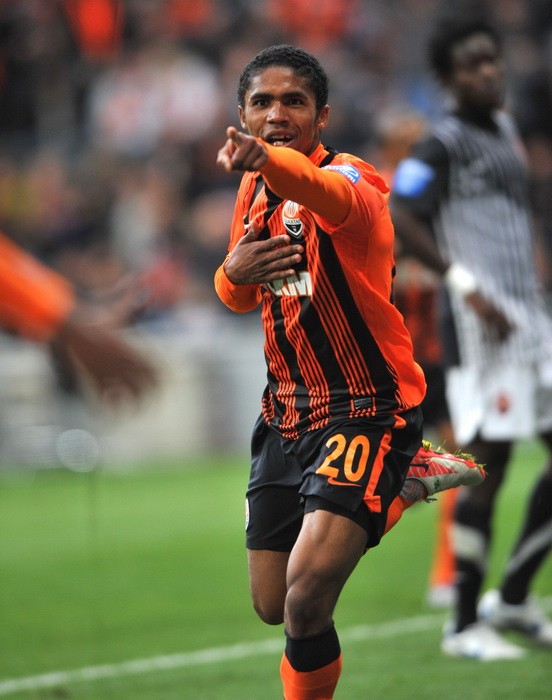
Costa playing for Shakhtar in 2011

Shakhtar started the 2011–12 season with a 3–1 loss in the Super Cup to Dynamo Kyiv on 5 July. Costa played the full 90 minutes. His first goal of the season came on 9 September, scoring the final goal in a 5–1 victory against Volyn Lutsk. On 2 October, he scored the equalising goal in a 4–1 victory over Zorya Luhansk. On 6 November, he scored the first goal in a 2–0 win over Obolon Kyiv. On 27 November, he scored a penalty to open the scoring in a 5–0 victory over Karpaty Lviv. On 2 December, he netted a goal against Arsenal Kyiv in a comprehensive 5–0 win. On 11 December, he scored the first goal in a 4–0 win against Kryvbas. On 27 April, he scored a 90th-minute goal in a 4–3 victory over Volyn in the Ukrainian Cup. He made a 62nd-minute substitute appearance, replacing Henrikh Mkhitaryan, in Shakhtar's 2–1 extra time victory over Metalurh Donetsk.

At the end of the season, Shakhtar won the Premier League and the Ukrainian Cup, Costa's third Premier League title success in his third year with the club. He played 34 matches, scoring six goals. Twenty-seven of the appearances and all six of the goals came in the league.

==== 2012–13 season ====
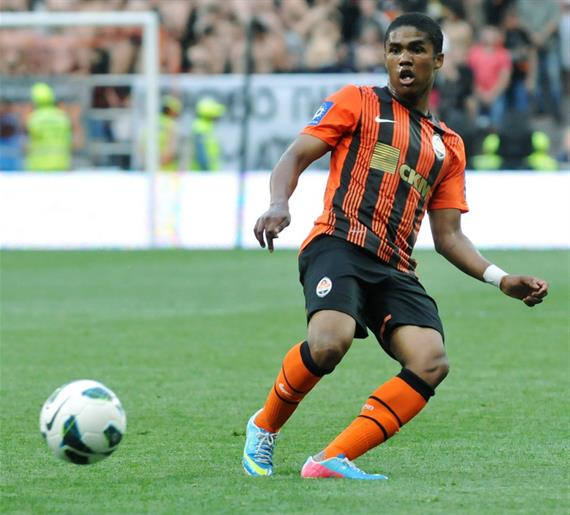
Costa playing for Shakhtar in 2013

Costa opened the 2012–13 season with a goal in Shakhtar's 2–0 win against Metalurh Donetsk in the Super Cup, his second success in the Super Cup with Shakhtar. He scored his first league goal of the season on 3 November 2012 when he converted a 20th-minute penalty against Metalurh Zaporizhya; the match finished 2–0 thanks to a late goal by Luiz Adriano. On 24 November, Douglas came off the bench in the 55th minute, replacing team captain Darijo Srna, and netted a goal seven minutes later when he was played in by Armenian forward Henrikh Mkhitaryan, as Shakhtar defeated Hoverla Uzhhorod 5–1.

During the group stages of the season's edition of Champions League, Costa only managed three substitute appearances, totaling 23 minutes played, as Shakhtar finished second in the group behind Serie A champions Juventus, while dumping holders Chelsea out of the competition. Following an underwhelming first half of the 2012–13 campaign, Costa came off the bench to score a vital goal in Shakhtar's 2–2 first leg draw with Borussia Dortmund in the Champions League Round of 16 tie on 13 February 2013.

==== 2013–14 season ====
Costa made his season debut in the Super Cup. In mid-season, he helped Shakhtar win the 2014 United Supercup, a tournament between the top-two placed clubs from Russia and Ukraine, becoming the joint top scorer of the tournament. He helped the club win the Premier League and was a joint assist leader of the league with nine assists.

==== 2014–15 season ====
Costa played 33 games in all competitions and scored 5 goals in his final season at Shakhtar Donetsk, including a goal in a 7–0 away win over BATE Borisov in the Champions League. He also played in both matches in the Champions League round of 16 against Bayern Munich.

=== Bayern Munich ===
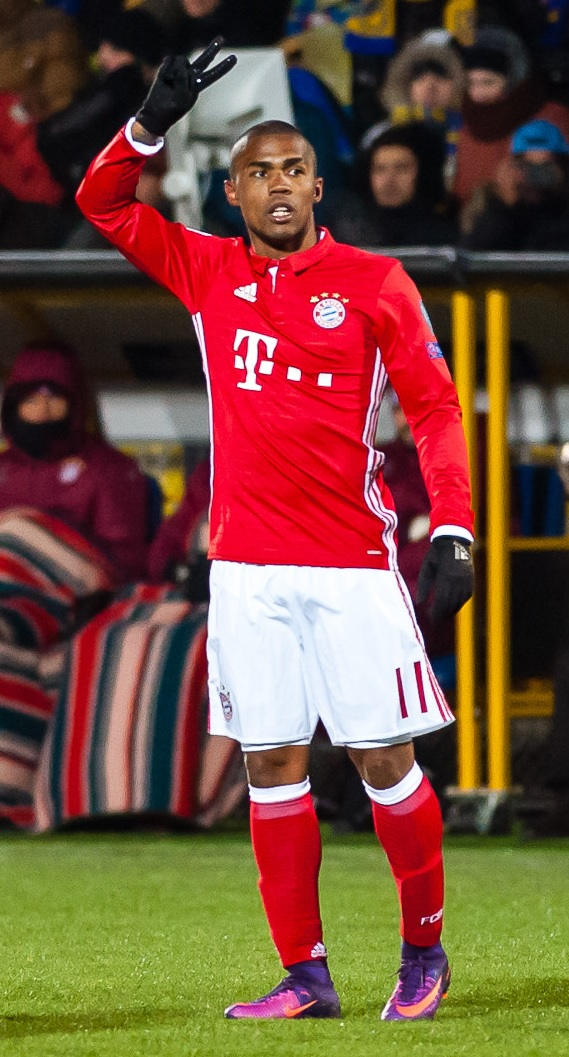
Costa playing for Bayern Munich in 2016

==== 2015–16 season ====
On 1 July 2015, Bayern Munich announced they had signed Costa for a transfer fee of €30 million. Costa signed a five-year contract. The €30 million transfer fee was the fourth-highest in Bayern's history. He was given the number 11 shirt previously worn by Xherdan Shaqiri. He made his debut as a starter on 1 August in the 2015 DFL-Supercup away to VfL Wolfsburg, crossing for Arjen Robben to open the scoring in an eventual 1–1 draw; he netted his attempt in the subsequent penalty shoot-out, but his team lost nonetheless. Costa scored his first Bundesliga goal in his first Bundesliga game in a 5–0 win against Hamburger SV. On 21 May 2016, Costa scored the winning kick of the penalty shootout against Borussia Dortmund to win the 2016 DFB-Pokal Final and secure a league and cup double for Bayern.

Costa enjoyed a good first season at Bayern scoring seven goals in 43 matches throughout all competitions. He started the season in great form and had 12 assists in his first 13 games. Then he picked up a muscle injury and missed the last four games before the winter break. After the winter break, Costa could not regain his former form. In 27 Bundesliga matches, Costa scored four goals and had 14 assists.

==== 2016–17 season ====
Costa got a new manager when Bayern hired Carlo Ancelotti. He had enjoyed regular playing time under Pep Guardiola and was a regular starter, but Ancelotti preferred Franck Ribéry as the left winger. Costa had a hamstring and knee injury during the season and played in 34 matches in all competitions. He scored seven goals in those matches and matching his scoring tally from last season, and played nearly 1,400 fewer minutes than the season before. Costa had a fall-out with the Bayern board when he complained publicly about his lack of playing time under Ancelotti. Costa said, "I speak to the club often," he said. "We talk about my situation, if I'll stay here or if I have to find another team to play for. I'm not always that happy here. But soon we will find a situation." Shortly before, Bayern president Uli Hoeneß, had accused Costa of attempting to earn himself an improved contract when Costa publicly revealed he was unsure about where his future lay and cited interest from the Premier League, La Liga, Ligue 1 and the Chinese Super League.

==== 2017–18 season: Loan to Juventus ====
On 12 July 2017, Costa joined Juventus on loan until the end of the 2017–18 season, for €6 million. Juventus has an option to make the move permanent on 1 July 2018, for an additional €40 million fee (plus €1M in bonuses). On 13 August, he made his club debut, coming on as a substitute in a 3–2 defeat to Lazio in the 2017 Supercoppa Italiana. On 14 October, he scored his first goal for the club in a 2–1 home defeat to Lazio. In his debut season he scored four goals in Serie A in 31 appearances, and two goals in five appearances in the Coppa Italia (one of which came in Juventus's 4–0 victory over Milan in the 2018 Coppa Italia Final, at the Stadio Olimpico in Rome, on 9 May), recording six goals in 47 appearances across all competitions, as Juventus won a domestic double; he also led the league in dribbles (106) and recorded the second-most assists (14) in Serie A.

=== Juventus ===
==== 2018–19 season ====
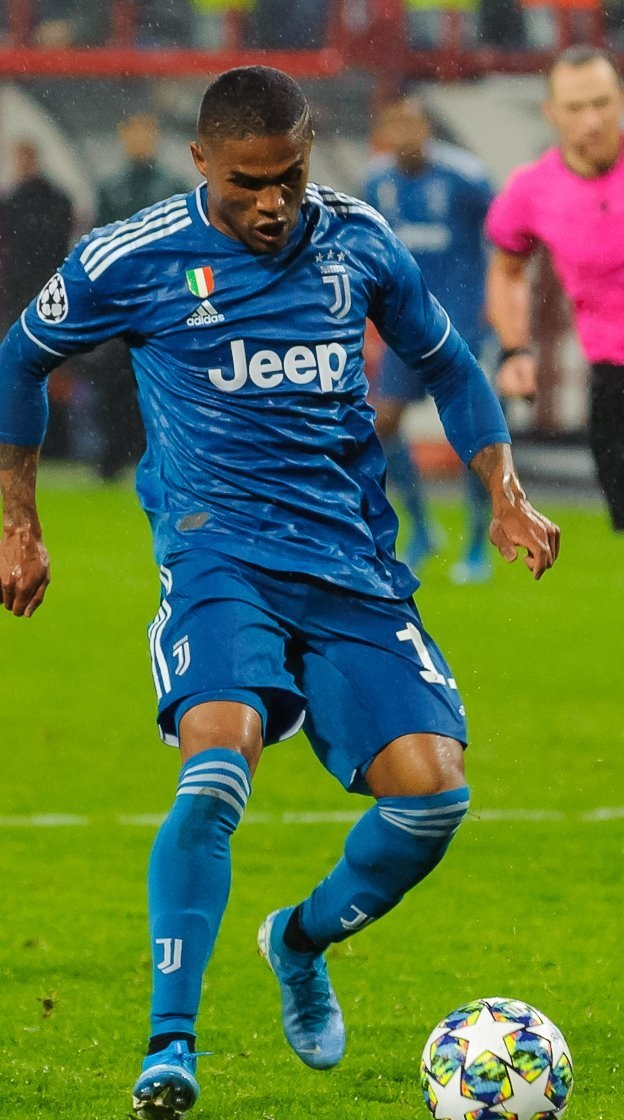
Douglas Costa in 2019 in Champions League

On 7 June 2018, Juventus made his loan move permanent, signing Costa to a four-year deal for a fee of €40 million plus bonuses. On 16 September 2018, in a 2–1 home win over Sassuolo in Serie A, Costa was sent-off in injury time following an altercation with Federico Di Francesco. The two players had clashed in the build-up to Sassuolo's 91st-minute consolation goal, scored by Khouma Babacar, following a late challenge on Di Francesco by Costa. As both players got up, Costa appeared to elbow Di Francesco and later attempted to headbutt him, before finally spitting in his face. Costa was initially booked for the headbutt, but the controversial incident was later reviewed by VAR officials, who alerted the referee of his subsequent actions, and as a result, he was sent off. Juventus manager Massimiliano Allegri commented in the post-match press conference that Costa will be fined by the club. Costa later wrote a public apology on Instagram, stating, "I want to apologise to all the Juventus fans for this over the top reaction I had during today’s game. I also apologise to my teammates, who are always by my side, in good and bad times. It was ugly, I am aware of that, and I apologise to everyone for that. I want to make clear that this isolated conduct has nothing to do with what I’ve shown throughout my career." Two days later on 18 September, Costa was given a four-match Serie A ban for his elbow, attempted headbutt and spit on Federico Di Francesco.

==== 2019–20 season ====
On 6 November 2019, Costa scored his first Champions League goal with Juventus in a 2–1 away win against Lokomotiv Moscow. On 20 July 2020, he made his 100th appearance for Juventus in a 2–1 home win over Lazio.

==== 2020–21 season: Loan return to Bayern ====
On 5 October 2020, on deadline day, Bayern Munich announced the return of Costa on a season-long loan. On 28 November, he scored his first goal of the season in a 3–1 away win over Stuttgart. After winning his third Bundesliga title with the club, his loan was brought to an end on 21 May 2021.

==== 2021–22 season: Loan to Grêmio ====
On 21 May 2021, Juventus confirmed Costa's loan move to Grêmio for free until 30 June 2022.

=== LA Galaxy ===
==== 2022 season ====
On 10 February 2022, Costa joined Major League Soccer club LA Galaxy on a six-month loan from Grêmio as a Designated Player. Following the conclusion of his loan spell, he signed a permanent contract on a one-and-a-half-year deal. He scored his first goal for the club on 12 March in a 3–2 loss to Seattle Sounders.

=== Fluminense ===
On 28 January 2024, Costa returned to Brazil, joining Série A side Fluminense on a contract until July 2025. He helped the club to win the 2024 Recopa Sudamericana title against Ecuadorian club LDU Quito. However, his contract was mutually terminated on 24 July; in his six-month stay at the club, Costa made 22 appearances.

=== Sydney FC ===
On 26 August 2024, it was announced Costa had signed a 2-year deal with A-League club Sydney FC ahead of their 2024–25 season. Costa made his debut for the club on 19 September during the 2024–25 AFC Champions League Two home fixtures against Hong Kong club Eastern where he recorded an assist for Rhyan Grant in a 6–0 thrashing win. On 12 December, he scored a brace and recorded an assist in a 3–3 league draw against Adelaide United. During the round of 16 second leg fixtures of the 2024–25 AFC Champions League Two against Bangkok United at the Thammasat Stadium, Costa assisted Adrian Segecic in the 88th minute to level up the tie at 4–4 on aggregate where Costa would go on to scored the winning goal in extra time to send his team to the quarter-final.

Costa mutually terminated his contract with Sydney FC on 17 September 2025; due to financial and legal matters concerning his family in Brazil, Costa was unable to leave the country and join his teammates in Australia.

=== ChievoVerona ===
In January 2026, Costa joined Italian side ChievoVerona in Serie D.

== International career ==
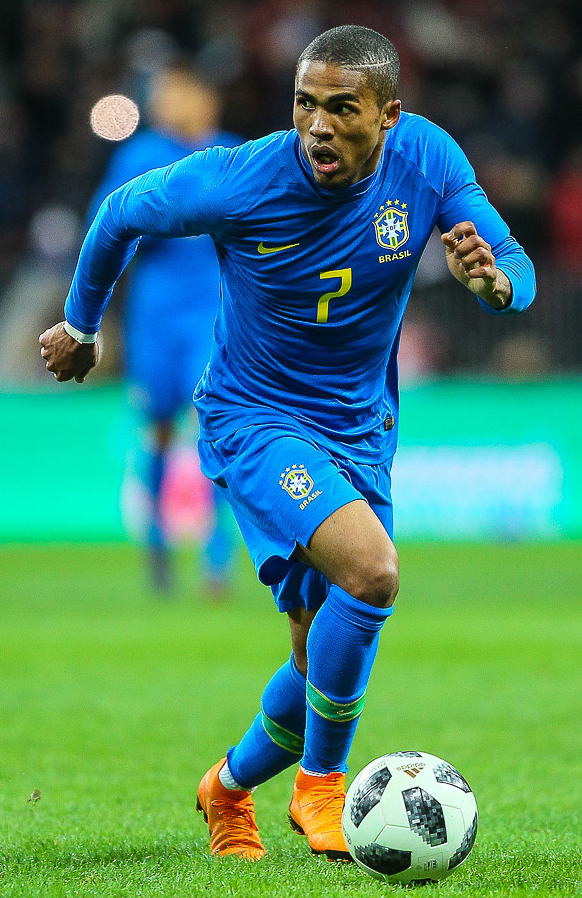
Costa on international duty, facing Russia in 2018

Costa was part of the under-20 team in the 2009 FIFA U-20 World Cup hosted by Egypt. In the tournament, Brazil reached the final match against Ghana, losing in the penalty shoot-out. Costa was one of the three Brazilians to score their penalty kicks.

In November 2014, Costa was called up to the Brazil national team for the first time by coach Dunga, making his international debut against Turkey in Istanbul.

In May 2015, Costa was included in Brazil's 23-man squad for the 2015 Copa América. In the team's opening match, he came on as a substitute for Diego Tardelli and scored a stoppage-time winning goal against Peru, his first for the Seleção. In the quarter-final against Paraguay in Concepción, he replaced former Shakhtar teammate Willian for the final 30 minutes of a 1–1 draw, and then missed in the penalty shoot-out which eliminated Brazil. On 17 November, Costa scored his second goal for Brazil in 3–0 victory against Peru for 2018 FIFA World Cup qualification.

Costa was initially included in Brazil's squad for the Copa América Centenario, but was forced to withdraw from the squad in late May 2016 after sustaining an injury to his left thigh; he was replaced by Kaká.

On 14 June 2016, then-technical director Gilmar Rinaldi for the Brazilian Football Confederation, "shortly after he was sacked", stated that Bayern would let Costa play at the 2016 Summer Olympics.

In May 2018, he was named in Tite's final 23-man squad for the 2018 FIFA World Cup in Russia.

== Style of play ==
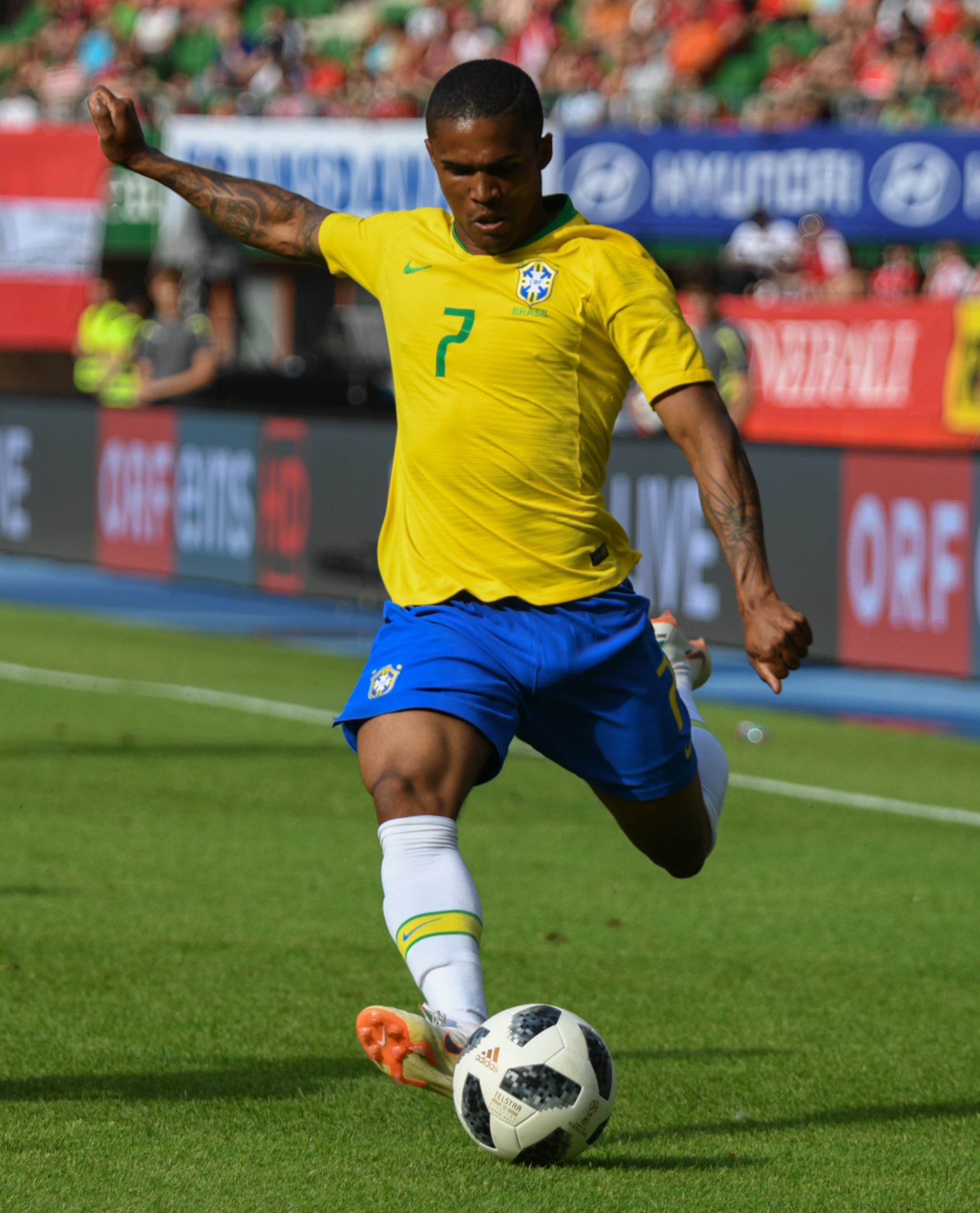
Douglas Costa about to cross the ball in a friendly against Austria in 2018

Regarded as a promising prospect in his youth, in 2010, Costa was included in Don Balón's list of the 100 best young players born after 1989. A diminutive player, with a slender build and an eye for goal, he initially played as a forward or attacking midfielder in his early career, but later established himself as a versatile winger, capable of playing on either flank, and of adapting himself to several different formations, due to his energy and work-rate, as well as his powerful and accurate striking ability from distance with either foot; however, he usually favours the right wing, as it enables to cut into the centre onto his stronger left foot. Nicknamed the Flash, he is mainly known for his speed, agility, and explosive acceleration, both with and without the ball, as well as his dribbling skills, technical ability, creativity, and trickery in possession, which enable him to beat opponents in one on one situations. A creative player, he is also highly regarded for his crossing ability from the left flank, which makes him an excellent assist provider, despite not being particularly prolific in front of goal. His former Bayern Munich manager Guardiola once labelled him "one of the best wingers in the world." Despite his talent, however, his discipline, mentality, and consistency have been brought into question at times by managers and pundits.

== Career statistics ==
=== Club ===
As of match played 17 May 2026

Club	Season	League			State League^{4}		Cup^{1}		Continental^{2}		Other^{3}		Total		Ref.
Club	Season	Division	Apps	Goals	Apps	Goals	Apps	Goals	Apps	Goals	Apps	Goals	Apps	Goals	Ref.
Grêmio	2008	Série A	6	1	0	0	0	0	—		—		6	1	
Grêmio	2009	Série A	22	1	7	0	0	0	2	0	—		31	1	
Grêmio	Total		28	2	7	0	0	0	2	0	—		37	2	—
Shakhtar Donetsk	2009–10	Ukrainian Premier League	13	5	—		0	0	2	0	—		15	5	
Shakhtar Donetsk	2010–11	Ukrainian Premier League	27	5	—		4	0	10	2	1	0	42	7	
Shakhtar Donetsk	2011–12	Ukrainian Premier League	27	6	—		4	1	5	0	1	0	37	6	
Shakhtar Donetsk	2012–13	Ukrainian Premier League	27	5	—		3	0	5	1	1	1	36	7	
Shakhtar Donetsk	2013–14	Ukrainian Premier League	27	4	—		3	1	8	2	1	0	39	7	
Shakhtar Donetsk	2014–15	Ukrainian Premier League	20	4	—		5	0	8	1	0	0	33	5	
Shakhtar Donetsk	Total		141	29	—		19	2	38	6	4	1	202	38	—
Bayern Munich	2015–16	Bundesliga	27	4	—		4	1	11	2	1	0	43	7	
Bayern Munich	2016–17	Bundesliga	23	4	—		2	1	9	2	0	0	34	7	
Bayern Munich	Total		50	8	—		6	2	20	4	1	0	77	14	—
Juventus (loan)	2017–18	Serie A	31	4	—		5	2	10	0	1	0	47	6	
Juventus	2018–19	Serie A	17	1	—		2	0	5	0	1	0	25	1	
Juventus	2019–20	Serie A	23	1	—		4	1	1	1	1	0	29	3	
Juventus	2020–21	Serie A	2	0	—		0	0	0	0	0	0	2	0	
Juventus	Total		73	6	—		11	3	16	1	3	0	103	10	—
Bayern Munich (loan)	2020–21	Bundesliga	11	1	—		2	0	6	0	1	0	20	1	
Grêmio (loan)	2021	Série A	26	3	—		1	0	1	0	—		28	3	
LA Galaxy	2022	Major League Soccer	27	4	—		—		—		2	0	29	4	
LA Galaxy	2023	Major League Soccer	19	3	—		1	1	—		2	0	22	4	
LA Galaxy	Total		46	7	—		1	1	—		4	0	51	8	—
Fluminense	2024	Série A	10	0	5	0	1	0	4	0	2	0	22	0	
Sydney FC	2024–25	A-League Men	16	4	—		—		9	2	—		25	6	
ChievoVerona	2025–26	Serie D	11	0	—		—		—		2	1	13	1	
Career total			411	60	12	0	41	8	96	13	17	2	577	83	—

- 1.Includes Copa do Brasil, Ukrainian Cup, DFB-Pokal, Coppa Italia and U.S. Open Cup
- 2.Includes Copa Libertadores, Copa Sudamericana, UEFA Champions League, UEFA Cup/Europa League and AFC Champions League Two
- 3.Includes Ukrainian Super Cup, DFL-Supercup, Supercoppa Italiana, FIFA Club World Cup, MLS Cup Playoffs, Leagues Cup and Recopa Sudamericana
- 4.Includes Campeonato Gaúcho, Campeonato Carioca and Serie D Playoffs

=== International ===
As of match played 20 November 2018

National team	Year	Apps	Goals
Brazil	2014	2	0
Brazil	2015	13	2
Brazil	2016	4	1
Brazil	2017	3	0
Brazil	2018	9	0
Total		31	3

Scores and results list Brazil's goal tally first.

List of international goals scored by Douglas Costa
No.	Date	Venue	Opponent	Score	Result	Competition
1	14 June 2015	Estadio Municipal Germán Becker, Temuco, Chile	Peru	2–1	2–1	2015 Copa América
2	17 November 2015	Itaipava Arena Fonte Nova, Salvador, Brazil	Peru	1–0	3–0	2018 FIFA World Cup qualification
3	26 March 2016	Itaipava Arena Pernambuco, Recife, Brazil	Uruguay	1–0	2–2	2018 FIFA World Cup qualification

== Honours ==
Shakhtar Donetsk

- Ukrainian Premier League: 2009–10, 2010–11, 2011–12, 2012–13, 2013–14
- Ukrainian Cup: 2010–11, 2011–12, 2012–13
- Ukrainian Super Cup: 2010, 2012, 2013

Bayern Munich

- Bundesliga: 2015–16, 2016–17, 2020–21
- DFB-Pokal: 2015–16
- FIFA Club World Cup: 2020

Juventus

- Serie A: 2017–18, 2018–19, 2019–20
- Coppa Italia: 2017–18
- Supercoppa Italiana: 2018

Fluminense

- Recopa Sudamericana: 2024

Brazil U20

- South American U-20 Championship: 2009
- FIFA U-20 World Cup runner-up: 2009

Individual

- Kicker Bundesliga Team of the Season: 2015–16
