= Channel One Cup (football) =

Channel One Cup Кубок Первого канала טורניר הערוץ הראשון הרוסי
- Founded: 2006
- Abolished: 2009
- Region: Eastern Europe and Israel
- Most championships: Shakhtar Donetsk (1 time); CSKA Moscow (1 time); Dynamo Kyiv (1 time)
- Broadcaster: Channel One

The Channel One Cup (Russian: Кубок Первого канала, Kubok Pervogo Kanala) was an annual pre-season commercial football tournament, organized by Russian TV Channel One and Roman Abramovich's foundation, the National Football Academy. The participants were champions and runners-up of the Russian Premier League, Ukrainian Premier League and Israeli Premier League. The total prize fund was about two million dollars, with the winner getting one million. The cup rules specified that at least half of the prize money must be channeled into developing young players.

The tournament was cancelled in 2009 due to the 2008 financial crisis. However, its legacy remained in the context of trying to create a united championship involving former CIS countries. The format set by the tournament was used in 2013 when creating the United Tournament, which was named by some as a "reincarnation of the Channel One Cup".

On average 5.5 million Russians watched the games of the tournament.

== History ==
The tournament took place in Israel at January due to the fine weather conditions and wide fan base for the Russian and Ukrainian clubs formed by Jewish immigrants from the former Soviet Union. The cup is used as preparation for the more major spring tournaments, however the historical antagonism between Russian and Ukrainian clubs make the matches hard fought and fans interest very high.

In 2006, the first tournament took place in Tel Aviv. The Russian and Ukrainian champions and runners-up were: CSKA Moscow, Spartak Moscow, Dynamo Kyiv and Shakhtar Donetsk. Finally, Shakhtar Donetsk won the trophy.

In 2007, the format was changed, when Maccabi Haifa and Hapoel Tel Aviv were added to the tournament. The teams were divided into two groups and the winners met in the final. CSKA Moscow won 2007 tournament.

In 2008, the two Russian sides were CSKA Moscow and Spartak Moscow (2nd and 3rd, because Zenit St Petersburg declined to take part), the two Ukrainian: Dynamo Kyiv and Shakhtar Donetsk, Israeli champion Beitar Jerusalem and Serbian champion Red Star Belgrade. Dynamo Kyiv won the 2008 tournament.

In 2009, the cup was cancelled due to the 2008 financial crisis. However, its legacy remained in the context of trying to create a united championship involving formed CIS countries.

== Winners ==
Season	Winner	Runner-up	Final score	Top goalscorer
2006	(Ukraine) Shakhtar Donetsk	(Ukraine) Dynamo Kyiv	Round-robin	(Brazil) Brandão ( (Ukraine) Shakhtar, 3 goals)
2007	(Russia) CSKA Moscow	(Russia) Spartak Moscow	3–2 (a.e.t.)	(Russia) Roman Pavlyuchenko ( (Russia) Spartak Moscow, 4 goals)
2008	(Ukraine) Dynamo Kyiv	(Ukraine) Shakhtar Donetsk	2–2 (pen.: 3–2)	(Brazil) Fernandinho ( (Ukraine) Shakhtar, 4 goals)
~~2009~~	Cancelled			

== See also ==
- United Tournament
