= Streltsov =

Streltsov (Russian: Стрельцов) is a Russian masculine surname originating from the word strelets meaning shooter; its feminine counterpart is Streltsova. It may refer to

- Aleksandr Streltsov (born 1975), Soviet-born Swiss bobsledder
- Alexander Streltsov (born 1990), Russian ice hockey forward
- Andrei Streltsov (born 1984), Russian footballer
- Eduard Streltsov (1937–1990), Soviet footballer
  - Eduard Streltsov Stadium in Moscow, Russia
- Lev Streltsov (1918–1979), Ukrainian professor of law
- Olga Streltsova (born 1987), Russian track cyclist
- Valentin Streltsov, Ukrainian iconographer
- Valery Streltsov (born 1948), Belarusian association football manager
- Vasily Streltsov (born 1990), Russian professional ice hockey forward
- Vitali Streltsov (born 1982), Russian footballer
- Streltsov (film), a 2020 biographical sports drama film

== Related ==
- Strelkov
