= Arnold Ross =

American mathematician (1906–2002)

Arnold Ephraim Ross
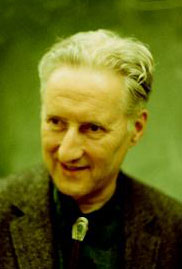
- Ross in 1970
- Born: Arnold Ephraim Chaimovich; August 24, 1906; Chicago, Illinois, US
- Died: September 25, 2002 (aged 96)
- Education: University of Chicago
- Known for: Mathematics education (Ross Mathematics Program)
- Spouse(s): Bertha (Bee) Halley Horecker; Madeleine Green
- Scientific career
- Fields: Number theory
- Workplaces: California Institute of Technology, St. Louis University, University of Notre Dame, Ohio State University
- Thesis: "On Representation of Integers by Indefinite Ternary Quadratic Forms of Quadratfrei Determinant" (1931)
- Doctoral advisor: L. E. Dickson
- Other academic advisors: Samuil Shatunovsky, E. H. Moore
- Doctoral students: Margaret Willerding

Arnold Ephraim Ross (August 24, 1906 – September 25, 2002) was a mathematician and educator who founded the Ross Mathematics Program, a number theory summer program for gifted high school students. He was born in Chicago, but spent his youth in Odesa, Ukraine, where he studied with Samuil Shatunovsky. Ross returned to Chicago and enrolled in University of Chicago graduate coursework under E. H. Moore, despite his lack of formal academic training. He received his Ph.D. and married his wife, Bee, in 1931.

Ross taught at several institutions including St. Louis University before becoming chair of University of Notre Dame's mathematics department in 1946. He started a teacher training program in mathematics that evolved into the Ross Mathematics Program in 1957 with the addition of high school students. The program moved with him to Ohio State University when he became their department chair in 1963. Though forced to retire in 1976, Ross ran the summer program until 2000. He had worked with over 2,000 students during more than forty summers.

The program is known as Ross's most significant work. Its attendees have since continued on to prominent research positions across the sciences. His program inspired several offshoots and was recognized by mathematicians as highly influential. Ross has received an honorary doctorate and several professional association awards for his instruction and service.

== Early life and career ==
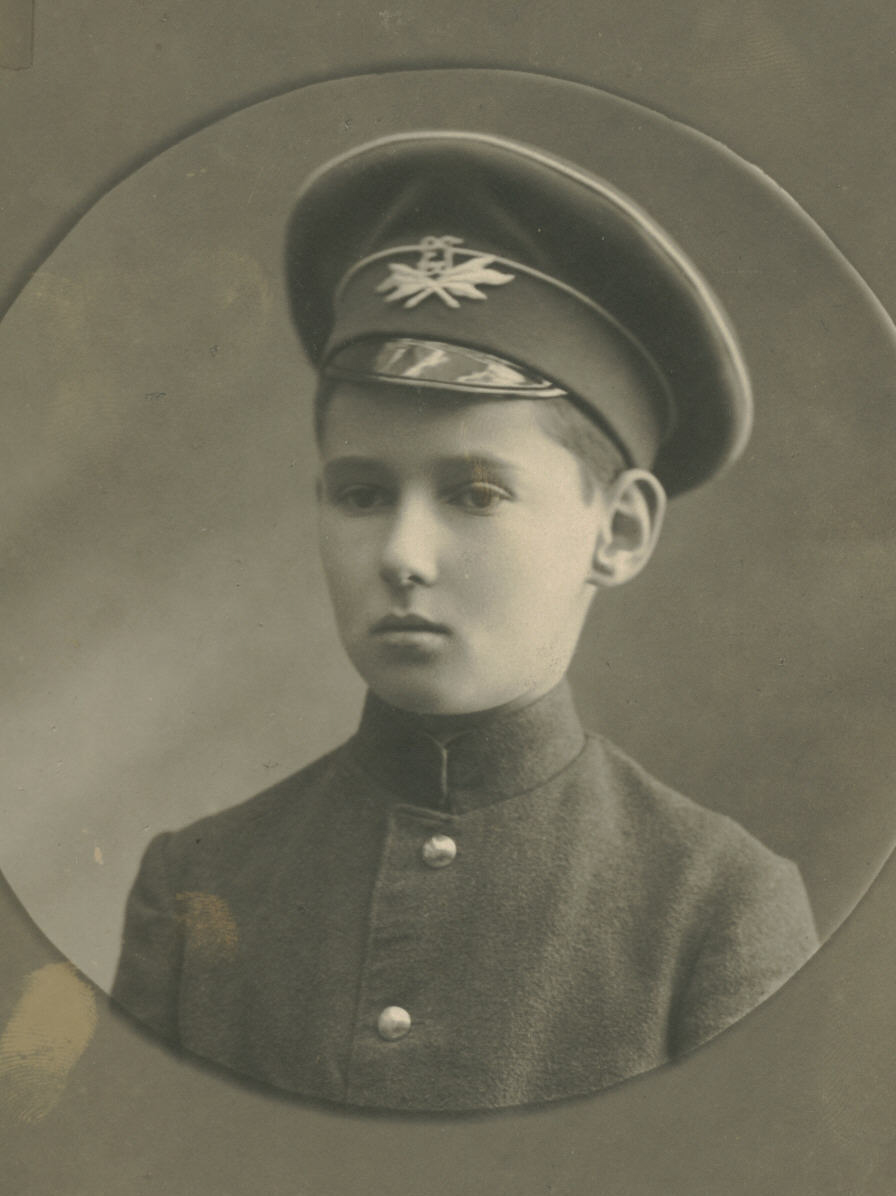
Ross as young boy in school uniform

Ross was born Arnold Ephraim Chaimovich on August 24, 1906, in Chicago to Ukrainian-Jewish immigrants. He was an only child. His mother supported the family as a physical therapist. Ross returned to Odesa, Ukraine with his mother in 1909 for assistance from her extended family, and stayed once World War I and the Russian Revolution broke out. The two events led to widespread famine and economic woe in the region. Ross learned Russian at the behest of his mother, and developed a love of the theater and language. Ross's mother encouraged him to read, which he did often, and subscribed to a private library since Odesa had no public library. He credited his favorite uncle, an X-ray diagnostician, with introducing him to mathematics. The uncle had hired Samuil Shatunovsky to tutor his talented son, and Ross asked to join in. As money meant little due to inflation, Shatunovsky was paid to tutor the two boys with a pound of French hard candy. During this time, Ross was not taught with textbooks or lectured on geometric proofs. His geometry teacher would ask the class to prove and justify ideas on the blackboard per trial and error. Many universities were closed due to the famine, but Odesa University reopened and let a small group of adolescents attend, including Ross.

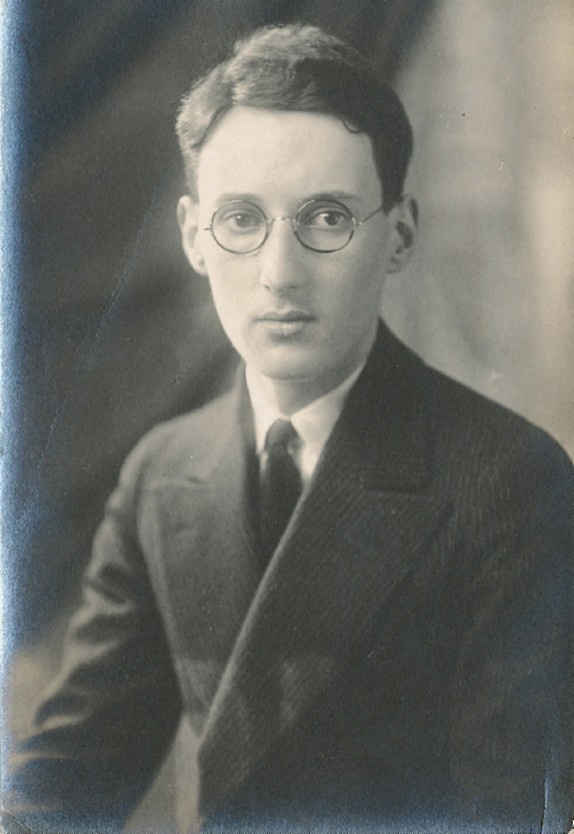
Ross in Odesa circa 1922

Ross left Odesa—now part of Ukraine—in 1922 with the intention of returning to Chicago and studying topology with E. H. Moore at the University of Chicago. After negotiating his way home, he worked at a family friend's bookbinding shop and continued to learn English at the Lewis Institute. He also changed his surname from Chaimovich to Ross in 1922. Ross used his salary from a year at the shop to enroll for one term at the University of Chicago in Moore's course. Moore gave Ross special attention, knowing his untraditional background, and arranged for Ross to attend the topology class as the sole undergraduate.

In Moore's teaching style, he would propose a conjecture and task the students with proving it. Students could respond with counter-conjectures that they would defend. Ross found Moore's method exciting, and his pedagogy influenced Ross's own. Ross graduated with a B.S. degree and continued his study as Leonard Eugene Dickson's research assistant. Ross earned a M.S. degree and finished his Ph.D. in number theory at the University of Chicago in 1931 with Dickson as his adviser. Ross's dissertation was entitled "On Representation of Integers by Indefinite Ternary Quadratic Forms". He did not pay tuition after his first quarter, which he credits to Dickson.

Ross married Bertha (Bee) Halley Horecker, a singer-musician and daughter of Ross's Chicago neighbors, in 1931, received a National Research Council Fellowship for 1932, and worked as a National Research Council postdoctoral fellow at California Institute of Technology with Eric Temple Bell until 1933. Ross moved back to Chicago and led the mathematics department at an experimental school started by Ph.D.s during the Great Depression, People's Junior College, where he also taught physics. Ross became an assistant professor at St. Louis University in 1935 and stayed for about 11 years. In an interview, he said he advocated for a student who became the first black woman in the South to receive a master's degree in mathematics. This exception led the university to admit black students despite the idea's widespread unpopularity. During World War II, Ross served as a research mathematician for the U.S. Navy. He befriended Hungarian mathematician Gábor Szegő while in St. Louis, who recommended Ross for a 1941 Brown University summer school that prepared young scientists to assist in the war, a program Ross attended. He occasionally worked on proximity fuzes for Stromberg-Carlson's laboratory from 1941 to 1945 before accepting a position as head of University of Notre Dame's mathematics department in 1946. He set out to change the school's research climate by inviting distinguished mathematicians including Paul Erdős, whom Ross made a full professor.

== Ross Mathematics Program ==
While at Notre Dame in 1947, Ross began a mathematics program that prioritized what he described as "the act of personal discovery through observation and experimentation" for high school and junior college teachers. In 1957, the program expanded via the National Science Foundation's post-Sputnik funds for teacher retraining, and Ross let high school students attend. This expansion became the Ross Mathematics Program, a summer mathematics program for talented high school students. The program lasts eight weeks and brings students with no prior knowledge to topics such as Gaussian integers and quadratic reciprocity. Though the program teaches number theory, by its Gauss-inspired motto, "Think deeply of simple things," its primary goal is to offer precollege students an intellectual experience as what he described as "a vivid apprenticeship to a life of exploration." The program is known for its intensity, and is considered America's "most rigorous number theory program." Ross was known to say, "No one leaves the program unchanged."

This emphasis on computation alone too often produces students who have never practiced thinking for themselves, who have never asked why things work the way they do, who are not prepared to lead the way to future scientific innovation. It is precisely this independence of thought and questioning attitude that the Ross Program strives to nurture.

— Ross Program brochure

The program usually has 40–50 first-year students, 15 junior counselors, and 15 counselors. Students are admitted by application—which includes a set of mathematical questions—or by showing "a great eagerness to learn." First-year students meet daily for lectures in elementary number theory and thrice weekly for problem seminars. They are encouraged to think like scientists and devise their own proofs and conjectures to the problems posed, which occupies most of their free time. Ross designed the daily problem sets, and many questions contain his signature directions: "Prove or disprove and salvage if possible." Successful students are asked to return as junior counselors and counselors in future summers. Junior counselors revisit the daily lectures and help first-years with their questions. They also can take advanced courses such as combinatorics and graduate seminars. Student problem sets are graded daily by the live-in counselors.

The program was funded in the 1960s by a National Science Foundation (NSF) program that supported summer programs in science education, but not returning students. As NSF support fluctuates, the program has been funded by various means including gifts from donors, scholarships from businesses, a National Security Agency grant, the university, and its mathematics department. It also receives financial support from the Clay Mathematics Institute.

The program grew rapidly with input from prominent mathematicians such as Ram Prakash Bambah, Hans Zassenhaus, Thoralf Skolem, and Max Dehn. In the 1960s and 1970s, Ross brought mathematicians including Zassenhaus, Kurt Mahler, and Dijen K. Ray-Chaudhuri to teach there regularly. Ross left Notre Dame to become chair of Ohio State University's mathematics department in 1963, and the program followed in the 1964 summer. The program briefly moved to the University of Chicago in the summers of 1975–1978 at mathematician Felix Browder's invitation. The program is unadvertised and depends on personal contacts and word of mouth to propagate. It is recognized by mathematicians as one of the best mathematics programs for high school students.

Admission to the program is competitive, with an approximately 15% acceptance rate.

== Retirement and death ==
Ross reached his mandatory retirement from Ohio State University in 1976, when he became Professor Emeritus, but continued to run the summer program through 2000, after which he had a stroke that left him physically impaired and unable to teach. Daniel Shapiro led the program upon Ross's exit. Shapiro was a former counselor at the program.

Ross received an honorary doctorate from Denison University in 1984, the 1985 Mathematics Association of America (MAA) Award for Distinguished Service, the 1998 MAA Citation for Public Service, and was named an American Association for the Advancement of Science Fellow in 1988. His teaching awards include Ohio State's Distinguished Teaching and Service Awards, and membership on the National Science Foundation's science education advisory board.

Ross helped begin similar programs in West Germany, India, and Australia. He consulted for an Indian gifted children program in 1973, assisted in an Australian National University January summer program for talented youth based on Ross's own from 1975 to 1983, and helped start another program in Heidelberg, Germany in 1978. He had previously created other mathematics programs, including the teacher training program (before it included high school students) and another program for Columbus, Ohio inner city middle and high school students called "Horizons Unlimited" in 1970.

Ross's wife, Bee, died in 1983 and left Ross in a deep depression. His colleagues said he "lived only for his summer program" in this period. He later met a French widow of a diplomat, Madeleine Green, and they married in 1990.

Ross died on September 25, 2002. Notices of the American Mathematical Society and MAA FOCUS ran memorial articles on Ross. Mathematicians such as Karl Rubin expressed their personal debts to Ross. He did not have any children.

== Legacy ==
Ross's biggest contribution to his field was not through his research, but through his mathematics education programs. He had run each of his summer programs from 1957 to 2000, working with over 2,000 students. His summer program graduates found roles in prestigious research positions in fields across the sciences. The Ross Program was acclaimed by mathematicians as highly influential.

The Ross Program inspired many similar programs, the closest in likeness being the Program in Mathematics for Young Scientists (PROMYS) at Boston University and the Honors Math Camp at Southwest Texas State University. Other programs at University of Chicago and University of Texas at San Antonio were inspired by Ross. The founders of PROMYS were Ross Program alumni, and when the Ross Program went to the University of Chicago for several years, mathematics chair Paul Sally slowly became supportive of the program and later began his own gifted students program. Informally, Ross Program and Ross's students are known as "Ross-1s" and those who study under them (including PROMYS attendees) are known as "Ross-2s".

The Arnold Ross Lecture Series founded in his name in 1993 and run by the American Mathematical Society puts mathematicians before high school audiences annually in cities across the United States. Ohio State University organized two reunion-conferences for Ross with program alumni, friends of Ross, and a series of science lectures, in 1996 and 2001.
