= Rasskazov =

Rasskazov (masculine, Russian: Рассказов) or Rasskazova (feminine, Russian: Рассказова) is a Russian surname. Notable people with the surname include:

- Alexander Rasskazov (1832–1902), Russian actor and theatre entrepreneur
- Anatoly Rasskazov (1941–2010), Soviet illustrator and photographer
- Kirill Rasskazov (born 1992), Russian ice hockey player
- Nikolai Rasskazov (born 1998), Russian soccer player
- Roman Rasskazov (born 1979), Russian race walker
- Yevgeny Rasskazov (born 1941), Soviet sports shooter

== See also ==
- Rasskazovo
