= A Protégée of the Mistress =

- Written by: Aleksander Ostrovsky
- Original language: Russian
- Genre: Social drama

Premiere
- Date premiered: 21 October 1863
- Place premiered: Maly Theatre in Moscow

A Protégée of the Mistress (Vospitannitsa, Воспитанница; also, The Ward Girl) is a play by Alexander Ostrovsky, first published in the No. 1, January 1859 issue of Biblioteka Dlya Chteniya. Refused the permission to be produced at the Imperial Theatres in October 1859, it premiered in Maly Theatre, Moscow, only on October 21, 1863.

== History ==
Ostrovsky conceived A Protégée of the Mistress in 1855 as a two-act play. On July 12 of that year he prepared a rough draft of the Act 1 and compiled a list of characters, some of which (retired official Zakhar Zveroboyev, merchant Savva Bruskov), were later dropped. The play's original title was "Game for a Cat, Tears for a Mouse" (Koshke igrushki, myshke slyozki), with a subtitle "Pictures of Rural Life".

In an April 21 letter to Alexander Druzhinin, Ostrovsky promised to quickly finish the play and bring it to Saint Petersburg soon, but failed to do so. It was completed on 7 December 1858 but for the next several months the author continued to make changes to the text. On 26 September 1859, A Protégée of the Mistress was approved by the Theatre and Literature committee but not unanimously: the chairman S.P.Zhikharev and A.G.Rogchev voted against. Ostrovsky's friend Ivan Gorbunov warned the author that this was a bad sign and proved to be right: on October 23 the play was banned by the head of the Third Department Alexander Timashev after a censor in his report poised the question: "Are we supposed to promote a play highlighting the immorality Russian landowners allegedly display in their daily life?"

In 1861 Fyodor Burdin made an unsuccessful attempt to persuade censors to lift the ban. The then chief of the Third Department L.A.Potapov refused to grant the permission, explaining: "What's the point of talking now about the serfdom and all the abuses of power [related to it]? Dvoryanstvo here is portrayed in quite an awful way. It's been getting enough stick these days to be finished off by such presentation on stage. Besides, there'll be elections in Moscow soon, and dvoryanstvo may take offense." When Burdin pointed to him that there were no references to either dvoryanstvo or serfdom in the play, Potapov replied: "Sure, things are not said here directly, but we are not that naïve not to be able to read between the lines."

=== Productions ===
There were two unofficial performances of the play in 1861–1862, one at the Saint Petersburg's Merchants Club, as a benefit for actor Alexander Martynov, another on 27 January 1862 at the Saint Petersburg Passage Theatre, organized by the Theatrical Society as a charity for the Literary Fund. After the Imperial Theatres' license has been finally granted, the play premiered on October 21, 1863, as a benefit for actress Lyudmila Karskaya. It also featured Prov Sadovsky (Potapych), Nadezhda Rykalova (Ulanbekova), Alexandra Kolosova (Nadya), Khioniya Talanova (Vasilisa Peregrinova), Alexander Pogonin (Leonid), Sofia Akimova (Gavrilovna), Alexander Rasskazov (Grisha), Vladimir Lensky (Negligentov), Maria Vasilyeva (Liza), Vera Strekalova (girl servant). The Alexandrinsky Theatre premiere took place on 22 November 1863, as a benefit for actress Yekaterina Zhuleva. Both performances were successful, according to the newspaper reports. Among the authors who reviewed the Alexandrinka show favourably were Apollon Grigoryev and Pyotr Boborykin.

== Reception ==
The play was greeted warmly by the Russian literary left. In a letter to Pavel Annenkov (dated January 29, 1859) Mikhail Saltykov-Shchedrin wrote: "Ostrovsky is the master of scenery, and the idea behind it is great too." Nikolai Dobrolyubov, reviewing the play in 1859, called it "quite remarkable" and praised the author's restraint in dealing with main heroine's character's more ugly features. "This work is devoid of roughness that usually comes with the author' conscious attempts to show how ugly and vulgar the subject of their hatred is. This play is remarkable for its placid, moderate tone," he wrote. Nadya was Dobrolyubov's favourite character. "In Ostrovsky's play her emotions are expressed with enormous force and clarity. There is no other portrait of such depth in the whole of the Russian literature," he wrote.

Critics from the literary left accepted Dobrolyubov's essay as a yardstick and never contradicted his verdict. "How much does this little drama say, what lively characters and scenes are being presented here for a viewer's imagination," marveled otherwise harsh Dmitry Pisarev in his Scholastics of the XIX Century (1861).

Russian liberal critics took to it less kindly. Nikolai Akhsharumov argued that Ostrovsky's writing style was sketch-like and his characters except for Nadya were caricatures, "...filtered out from lumps of human dirt of all kinds" and "making heavy impression upon one's heart" as the author was keen only to depict only "the dirtier spots of life".
