= Valerii Kublanovskyi =

Ukrainian electrochemist

- Валерій Семенович Кублановський
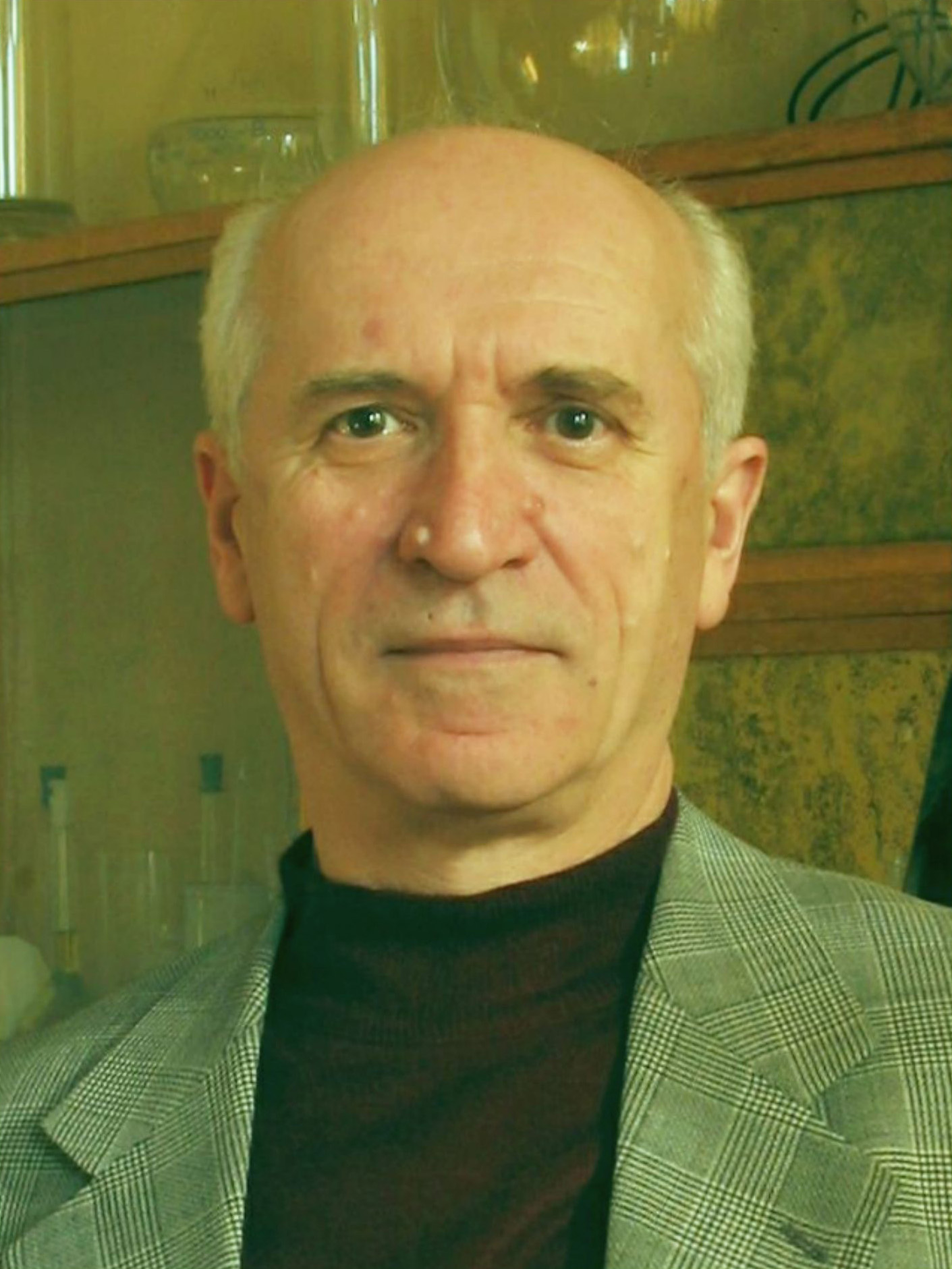
- Born: December 17, 1936; Odesa
- Citizenship: Ukraine
- Education: Odesa University
- Awards: National Prize of Ukraine named after Borys Paton, Prize of the National Academy of Sciences of Ukraine named after A. I. Brodsky
- Scientific career
- Fields: Electrochemistry
- Workplaces: Institute of General and Inorganic Chemistry named after V. I. Vernadsky of National Academy of Sciences of Ukraine

Valerii Semenovych Kublanovskyi (born 17 December 1936) is a Ukrainian electrochemist, Doctor of Chemical Sciences (1981), professor (1988), laureate of the National Prize of Ukraine named after Borys Paton (2021).

== Biography ==
Kublanovskyi graduated from Odesa University in 1959. After graduation, he worked in Odesa at the Black Sea Shipping Company. In 1960-1961, he worked at the Odesa Hydrobiological Station of the Institute of Hydrobiology of the Academy of Sciences of the Ukrainian SSR. Since 1962, he has been working in Kyiv at the Institute of General and Inorganic Chemistry named after V. I. Vernadsky of National Academy of Sciences of Ukraine, where since 1983 he has held the position of Head of the Department of Electrochemical Materials Science and Electrocatalysis.

== Researcher ==
His research focuses on the theory of electrode processes, electrochemical mass transfer, electrochemistry of coordination compounds, chemical current sources, electrocatalysis, theoretical and applied electroplating, and electrochemical ecology.

He is a member of the Academic Council of the Interdepartmental Department of Electrochemical Energy of the National Academy of Sciences of Ukraine, a member of the Academic Council of the Vernadsky Institute of General and Inorganic Chemistry of the National Academy of Sciences of Ukraine, member of the editorial board of the Ukrainian Chemical Journal].

== Awards ==
- Prize of the National Academy of Sciences of Ukraine named after A. I. Brodsky — for the series of works “Structure and reactivity of metal coordination compounds in electrodeposition and electrocatalysis” (2018)
- National Prize of Ukraine named after Borys Paton — for the work “Electrochemistry of functional materials and systems” (2021)

== Works ==
Among his main works:

1. Concentration changes in the near-electrode layers during electrolysis. Kyiv, 1978 (co-authored);
2. Pulse electrolysis. Kyiv, 1990 (co-author);
3. Mechanism of electrode reactions of coordination compounds // UHZh. 1993. No. 5;
4. Pulse electrolysis of alloys. Kyiv, 1996 (co-authored);
5. Scientific achievements and directions of work in the field of electrochemistry of aqueous solutions // UHZh. 2004. No. 7;
6. Sanitary-microbiological and hygienic assessment of water media treated with cold plasma. Dnipro, 2009 (co-authored);
7. Electrochemistry in Ukraine // Bulletin of the National Technical University “Kharkiv Polytechnic Institute”. 2010. No. 3.Серед основних праць:
