= Shatunovsky =

Shatunovsky or Shatunovskiy (Russian: Шатуновский) is a Russian masculine surname; its feminine counterpart is Shatunovskaya. It may refer to the following notable people:

- Olga Shatunovskaya (1901–1990), Russian revolutionary
- Samuil Shatunovsky (1859–1929), Russian mathematician
