= Willerding =

Willerding is a surname. Notable people with the surname include:

- Hans-Joachim Willerding (born 1952), German politician
- Margaret Willerding (1919–2003), American mathematician
- Ulrich Willerding (1932–2021), German botanist
