= Pyotr Karyshkovsky =

Ukrainian historian and scholar

Petro Karyshkovsky
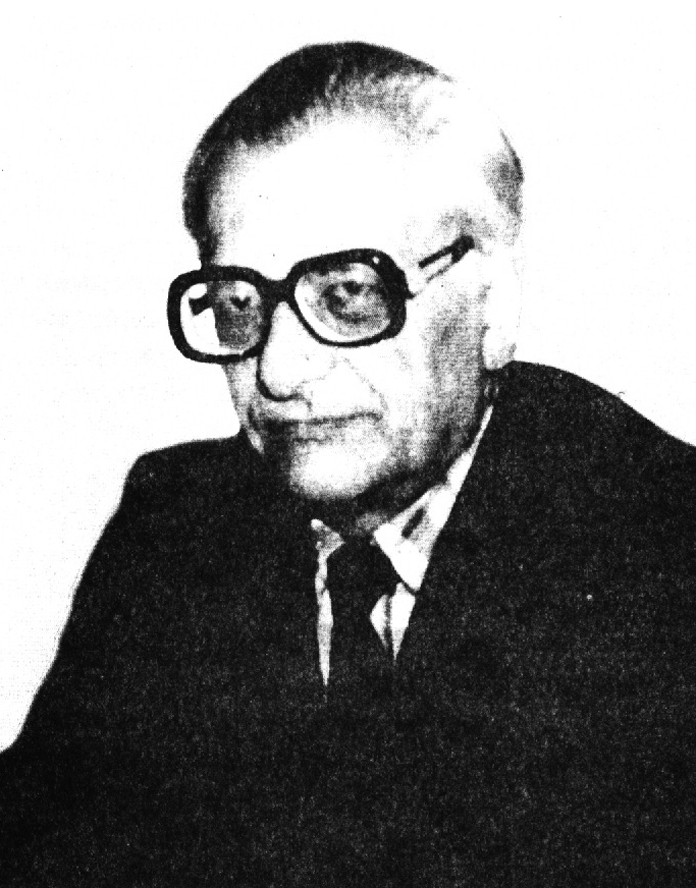
- Born: March 12, 1921; Odesa, Soviet Ukraine
- Died: March 6, 1988 (aged 66); Odesa, Soviet Union
- Occupations: Archaeologist, historian coins
- Known for: Coinage and Monetary Circulation in Olbia (6th century B.C. – 4th century A.D.)

Petro Karyshkovsky-Ikar (Ukrainian: Петро Йосипович Каришковський; March 12, 1921, Odesa – March 6, 1988, Odesa) was a Ukrainian Soviet historian, numismatist, a scholar and lexicographer.

Doctor of Historical Sciences, professor, since 1963 and until his last days he headed the department of ancient history and medieval Odesa University.

== Biography ==
In 1945, he graduated from the Faculty of History in Odesa University. During 1946–1948 he was a graduate student of World History (Ancient and Byzantine History). In 1951 Petro completed his master's thesis (Political relations between the Byzantine Empire, Bulgaria and Kyivan Rus' in the years 967–971) and at the same time began to publish articles in journals Questions of History, Byzantine chronicle, Journal of Ancient History on Rus'ian-Byzantine relations in the 10th century.

Over time, his research interests changed, and he became a researcher of antiquity, especially on the history and culture of the Northern Black Sea and the city of Byzantium. He published about 180 papers, of which the most significant focus on epigraphy and numismatics - especially the coins of Olbia, which Karyshkovskij-Ikar defended in his 1968 doctoral dissertation on Coinage and Monetary Circulation in Olbia (6th century B.C. – 4th century A.D.).

Continuing to work at the Odesa University, Karyshkovskij-Ikar read various courses of lectures, often on the history of Ancient Greece and Rome. Extensive knowledge and erudition enabled him over the years to lecture at the History Department of the six historical courses, six specialized disciplines and to develop a lot of special courses on ancient and medieval history, the course "Introduction to Numismatics" and others.

The depth of research of Petro was to a large extent because he had a perfect command of many languages: English, German, Italian, Romanian, Polish, Czech, Bulgarian, Serbian, Latin and ancient Greek.

Karyshkovskij-Ikar was elected a corresponding member of the German Archaeological Institute, the American Numismatic Society, and was a founding member of the Odesa Archaeological Society.

He was honoured by his native Odesa, which gave his name to a street of the city.

== Works ==
- Coins of Olbia: Essay of Monetary Circulation of the North-western Black Sea Region in Antique Epoch. Киев, 1988. ISBN 5-12-000104-1.
- Coinage and Monetary Circulation in Olbia (6th century B.C. – 4th century A.D.) Odesa (2003). ISBN 966-96181-0-X.
- The City of Tyras. A Historical and Archaeological Essay. Одесса: Polis-Press, 1994).. ISBN 9785770745313
- Bibliography
