= Khioniya Talanova =

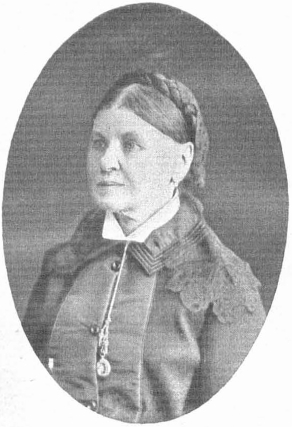
- Born: Khioniya Ivanovna Strelkova c. 1822; Nizhny Novgorod, Russian Empire
- Died: 17 May 1880; Moscow, Russian Empire
- Occupation: stage actress

Khioniya Ivanovna Talanova (Russian: Хиония Ивановна Таланова, née Strelkova, Стрелкова; c. 1822, in Nizhny Novgorod, Imperial Russia – 17 May 1880, in Moscow, Imperial Russia) was a Russian stage actress, associated with Moscow's Maly Theatre.

== Career ==
Strelkova started out in 1838 as a surf actress in the Nizhny's Shakhovskoy Theatre (where her younger sister Alexandra also excelled) before moving to the Kazan Theatre where she married the actor Grigory Talanov. In 1860 Khioniya Talanova joined Maly Theatre in Moscow with which she stayed until her death in 1880. She was best remembered for her parts in the plays by Alexander Ostrovsky, including A Protégée of the Mistress (Vasilisa Peregrinovna), The Marriage of Balzaminov (Matryona, including the Maly premiere, on 14 January 1863) and Enough Stupidity for Every Wise Man (Glumova, the first performer), as well as Kaurova (Breakfast at the Chief's by Ivan Turgenev), Varvara Timofeyevna (Special Envoy by Pyotr Karatygin), M-me Ducroz (Two Merchants, Two Fathers by Dmitry Lensky), and Mamelfa Timofeyevna (Posadnik, A.K. Tolstoy).
