= Tetiana Vilchynska =

Ukrainian linguist (born 1962)

- Тетяна Пилипівна Вільчинська
- Born: 10 June 1962 (age 64); Birches, Ukraine

Tetiana Pylypivna Vilchynska (Ukrainian: Вільчинська Тетяна Пилипівна, born 10 June 1962, Birches, USSR) is a Ukrainian linguist, Doctor of Philology, professor.

== Biography ==
She graduated from the Faculty of Philology of Odesa State University I. I. Mechnikov in 1984. Associate Professor (2001–2012), since 2012 – Professor of the Department of Ukrainian Language, since 2014 – Dean of the Faculty of Philology (now the Faculty of Philology and Journalism) of Ternopil Volodymyr Hnatiuk National Pedagogical University (TNPU).

Research interests: lexicology and grammar of the Ukrainian language, cognitive linguistics, linguoconceptology, ethnolinguistics, linguoculturology, pragmalinguistics, axiological linguistics, linguopoetics.

Editor-in-Chief of "Scientific Notes of TNPU. Series Linguistics", a member of the editorial boards of journals "Scientific Notes of TNPU. Series Literary Studies", "Media Space" (TNPU), "Philological Discourse" (Khmelnytsky Academy of Humanities and Education); reviewer of other professional publications.

She is the author of more than 170 publications, as well as numerous textbooks, manuals, scientific articles and teaching materials on the history of language and modern Ukrainian literary language.

== Sources ==
- Вільчинська Тетяна Пилипівна // ТНПУ (in Ukrainian)
- Сердечні вітання! // ТНПУ (in Ukrainian)
- Лінгвістична творчість Вільчинської Тетяни Пилипівни // Наукова бібліотека ТНПУ (in Ukrainian)
- Тетяна Вільчинська // Чтиво (in Ukrainian)
