= Grigorii Fikhtengol'ts =

Soviet mathematician (1888–1969)

- Григо́рий Фихтенго́льц
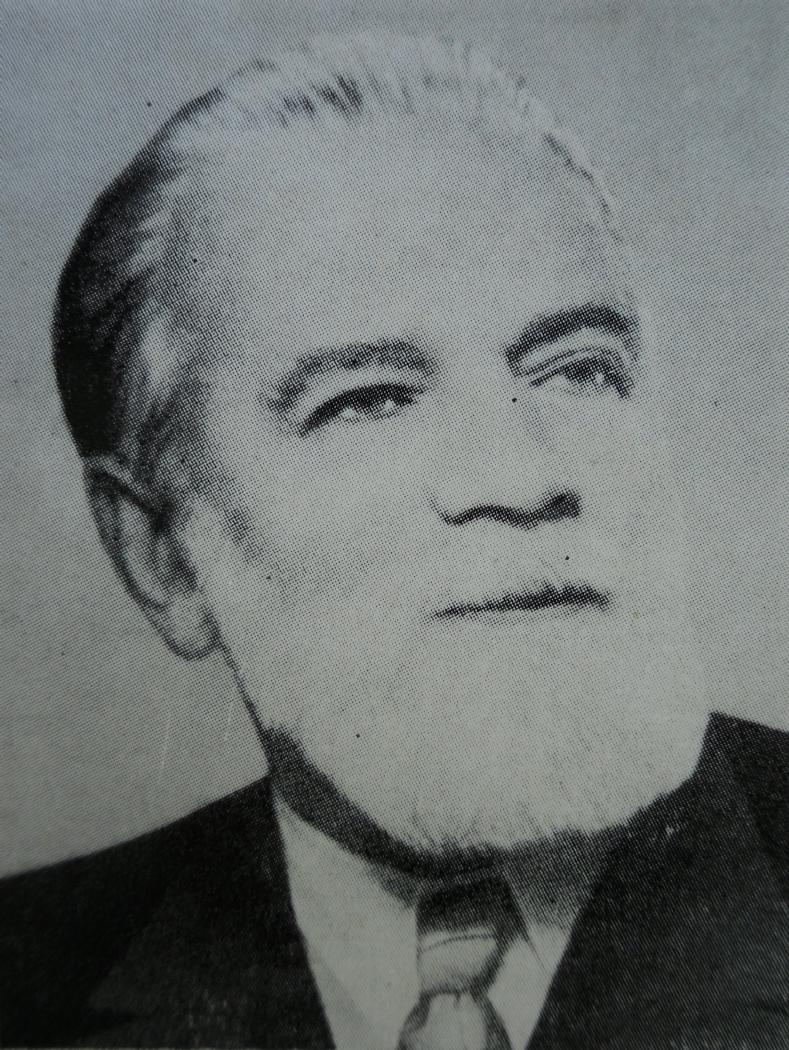
- Born: Grigorii Mikhailovich Fikhtengol'ts; June 8, 1888; Odessa, Russian Empire
- Died: 26 June 1959 (aged 71); Leningrad, Russian SFSR, Soviet Union
- Education: Imperial Novorossiia University
- Scientific career
- Fields: Real analysis, functional analysis
- Thesis: Theory of Depending on Parameter Primary Definite Integrals (1918)
- Doctoral advisor: Samuil Shatunovsky
- Doctoral students: Leonid Kantorovich; Isidor Natanson

Grigorii Mikhailovich Fikhtengol'ts (Russian: Григо́рий Миха́йлович Фихтенго́льц, Ukrainian: Григорій Михайлович Фіхтенгольц, romanized: Hryhorii Mykhailovych Fikhtenholts; 8 June 1888 – 26 June 1959) was a Soviet mathematician working on real analysis and functional analysis. Fikhtengol'ts was one of the founders of the Leningrad school of real analysis.

He was born in Odessa, Russian Empire in 1888, and graduated from the Imperial Novorossiia University in 1911.

He authored a three-volume textbook titled "A Course of Differential and Integral Calculus" (Курс дифференциального и интегрального исчисления). The textbook covers mathematical analysis of functions of one real variable, functions of many real variables, and complex functions. Due to the depth and precision of the material's presentation, the book holds a classical position in the mathematical literature. It has been translated into several languages, including German, Ukrainian, Polish, Chinese, and Persian. However, no English translation has been completed yet.

He also authored a two-volume textbook titled "The fundamentals of mathematical analysis", originally known as "Основы математического анализа". The textbook had been translated to Vietnamese and English. In Vietnam, the text is known as "Cơ sở giải tích toán học - G.M Fichtengôn".

Fikhtengol'ts's books on analysis are widely used in Middle and Eastern European, as well as Chinese universities, due to their exceptionally detailed and well-organized presentation of material on mathematical analysis. For unknown reasons, these books have not gained the same level of fame in universities in other parts of the world.

He was an Invited Speaker of the ICM in 1924 in Toronto.

Leonid Kantorovich and Isidor Natanson were among his students.

== Books ==
- Grigorii Mikhailovich Fikhtengol'ts (1965). The Fundamentals of Mathematical Analysis. Vol. 1. Pergamon Press. ISBN 9781483139074.
- Grigorii Mikhailovich Fikhtengol'ts (1965). The Fundamentals of Mathematical Analysis. Vol. 2. Pergamon Press. ISBN 9781483154138.
