= Vasili Streltsov =

Russian ice hockey player (born 1990)

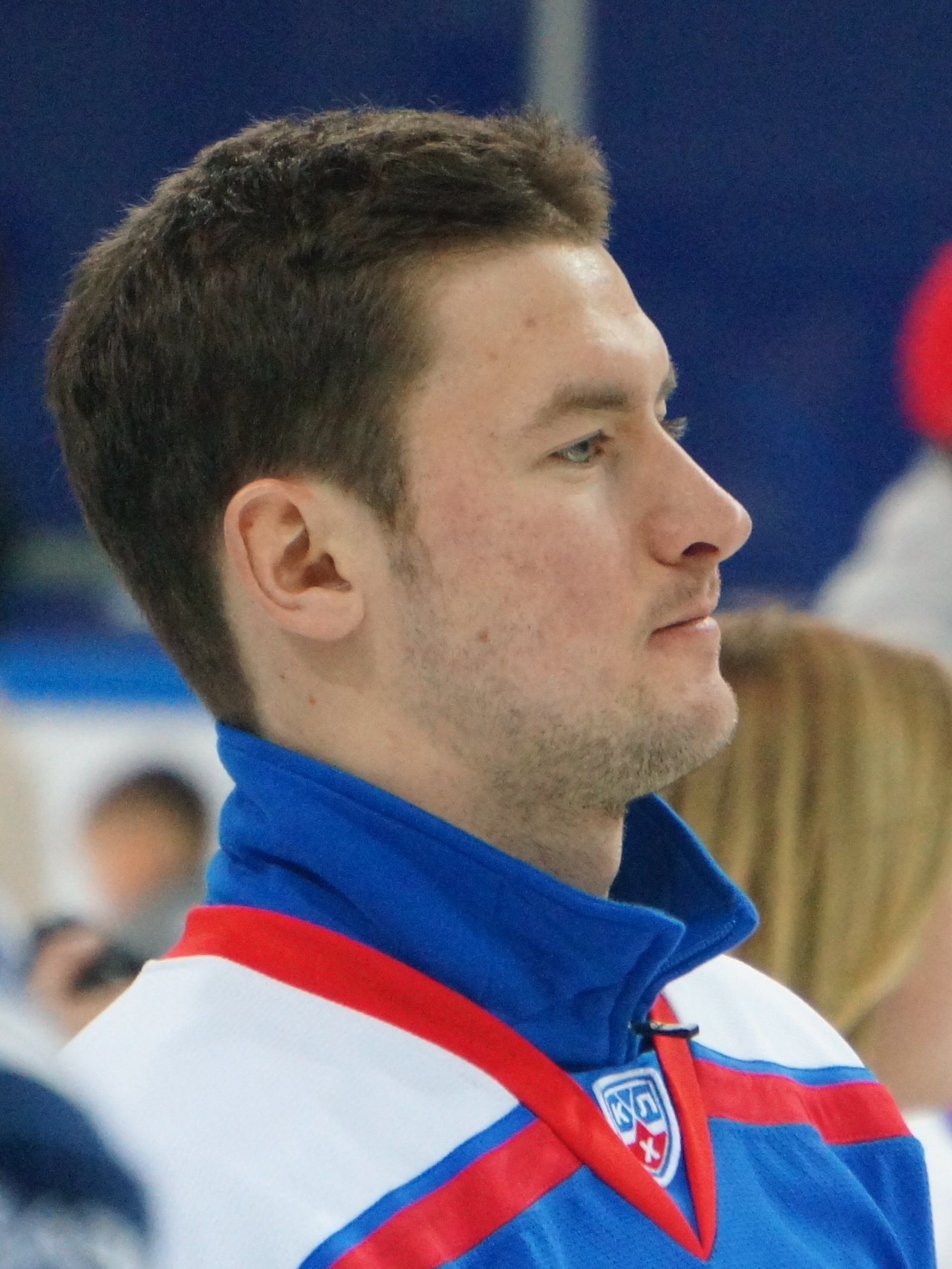
- Born: January 31, 1990 (age 35); Nizhnevartovsk, Russia
- Height: 6 ft 0 in (183 cm)
- Weight: 196 lb (89 kg; 14 st 0 lb)
- Position: Forward
- Shoots: Left
- VHL team Former teams: Sokol Krasnoyarsk; Avtomobilist Yekaterinburg; Lada Togliatti; Admiral Vladivostok
- Playing career: 2009–present

Vasili Streltsov (born January 31, 1990) is a Russian professional ice hockey forward who currently plays for Sokol Krasnoyarsk in the Supreme Hockey League (VHL).

He joined Lada alongside twin brother, Alexander, after playing with Avtomobilist Yekaterinburg.
