= Volodymyr Kedrowsky =

Ukrainian military leader (1890–1970)

- Володимир Кедровський
- Born: August 13, 1890; Kherson, Russian Empire (now Ukraine)
- Died: March 13, 1970 (aged 79); Metuchen, New Jersey, U.S.
- Burial place: St. Andrew Cemetery, South Bound Brook, New Jersey; 40.54608°N 74.52200°W
- Military career
- Allegiance: Ukrainian National Republic
- Branch: Army
- Rank: Colonel, Quartermaster General
- Other work: Diplomat, Author, Community and political activist

Volodymyr Ivanovych Kedrowsky (also Kedrovskyi, Ukrainian: Володимир Іванович Кедровський; August 13, 1890 – March 13, 1970) was a political activist, diplomat, writer, and a colonel in the army of the Ukrainian People's Republic (UPR). His military career took him from being a sub-poruchik in the Imperial Russian Army to the leadership of the State Inspectorate of the Army of the UNR. Subsequently, he served as in the diplomatic corps of the UNR to the Ottoman Empire and the Baltic States, and went on to play a major role in the Ukrainian American community as an exile in the United States.

== Biography ==
=== Early years ===
Kedrowsky was born in Kherson into a family of landowners originally of Prussian origin. His father's and mother's families had considerable land holdings along the Inhul and Inhulets rivers. He began his studies at home with his two younger brothers, and mastered Greek, German and a number of Slavic languages. After his father's death, he and his brothers lived on the estate of their maternal grandfather Mykola Lyps'kyi. In his autobiography "Outlines of the Past" («Обриси минулого») Kedrowsky wrote that the family spoke mainly in Ukrainian, and that his grandfather gave him Ukrainian-language books.

In 1905, Kedrowsky and some of his peers came under the influence of the Ukrainian Socialist Revolutionary Party, which argued that social liberation was not possible without Ukrainian national liberation. Several revolutionary groups were formed by Kherson youth. They adhered to the political program of the Socialist Revolutionaries, but were under the influence and leadership of Ukrainophiles. The groups staged performances of Ukrainian plays as propaganda campaigns among the Ukrainian peasantry, but these were soon banned, and many of the group members were arrested. Kedrowsky escaped arrest by illegally leaving the country in early 1907.

Kedrowsky graduated from the Kherson Realgymnasium, and completed his education at the Naval School. However, his Ukrainian anti-Imperial activism (especially among sailors) prevented him from obtaining a position with the Imperial Russian Navy. He moved to Odesa, where he studied at the Imperial Novorossiya University from 1907 to 1911, obtaining a degree in statistics and economics. After graduating, Kedrowsky married fellow Kherson native Marta Odarik.

=== Early political life ===
Since his youth, Kedrowsky belonged to the Central Committee of the Ukrainian Socialist Revolutionary Party, and was a member of the Kherson Hromada. From 1911 to July 19, 1914 he worked in the Kherson Zemstvo as an employee and then the head of the Statistical Division. In his autobiography, he described the Zemstvo as a citadel of Ukrainophiles. The Board sought permission from the government for the teaching of the Ukrainian language in public schools, and that all public libraries distributed Ukrainian books.

While at the Zemstvo, Kedrovskiy conducted a study that revealed the loss of literacy among people whose schooling was in Russian, but who later had no access to literature written in their native Ukrainian. Based on these results, Kedrowsky conducted a review of public education in the Kherson gubernia for 1910 and non-school educational activity in 1912. For this work, Kedrowsky received a silver medal on the occasion of the 50th anniversary of the founding of the Zemstvo. The statistical work of the Ukrainian Zemstvos became the basis of a bill on the need to teach children in their native language which was introduced in the Fourth State Duma, but which did not pass due to the outbreak of World War I.

Every summer during 1912–1914 Kedrowsky had the responsibility of organizing 6-week general education courses for teachers at rural schools in the Kherson gubernia. Under the guidance of members of the Kherson Hromada, Kedrowsky structured the courses in a way that introduced about five hundred teachers to the basics of Ukrainian Studies. This had to be done carefully, however, because the curricula and lecturers had to be confirmed by the Imperial Ministry of Education, whose representatives were instructed to ensure that there was no anti-Russian "sedition".

=== Russian military service ===
On July 19, 1914 Kedrowsky was drafted into the Imperial Russian Army, serving in the 48th infantry reserve regiment. From August 1914 to January 1915 he took part in battles against the German army in East Prussia. He was awarded the Order of St. George for bravery in battle. From July 1 to November 1, 1915 he attended the Odesa Military Cadet School, which he graduated at the top of his class and received the rank of praporshchik. From December 1, 1916 to June 15, 1917 he served as a gunnery commander in the Caucasian Native Mounted Division, which fought on the Galician and Rumanian fronts against Austrian, German, and Ottoman troops. Shortly afterwards, the commanders of the division forced Kedrowsky to leave, due to his pro-Ukrainian sentiments and his attempts to form a Ukrainian unit within the division.

=== The Ukrainian War of Independence ===
After the outbreak of the Russian Revolution, Kedrowsky was active in the Ukrainianization of military units. In May 1917 he participated in the meeting of the First National Military Congress in Kyiv, which marked a major turning point in his life. Prior to this, he had assumed that after the war Ukrainians would be free to decide their own future. But at the Congress he learned of the fierce opposition to this from the Russian side. Kedrowsky became an ardent follower of Symon Petliura, and spoke at the Congress about the need for the formation of Ukrainian national army. The Congress approved the creation of a Ukrainian General Military Committee as part of the Central Council of Ukraine.

At the Second Ukrainian Military Congress in June 1917, Kedrowsky was elected Deputy Chairman of the Ukrainian General Military Committee and led its Mobilization and Military Communications Section. He sought to quickly Ukrainianize military garrisons, unify the many small Ukrainian military units scattered along various fronts, and redeploy combat troops from the northern and western fronts to the southern and Romanian fronts. He was, however, met with strong resistance from the Russian Provisional Government and the Russian military command. In late August 1917 the Russian Provisional Government began to limit the powers of the Ukrainian Central Council. At Kedrowsky's initiative, a secret committee was formed to protect the national rights of Ukraine, consisting of himself, Mykhailo Hrushevskyi, Volodymyr Vynnychenko, Mykola Porsh, Mykhailo Tkachenko, Mykola Kovalevskyi, M. Saltan, and Symon Petliura.

On September 1, 1917, he was appointed Deputy Secretary of Military Affairs in the Ukrainian People's Republic, and received the rank of lieutenant-colonel of the Ukrainian People's Army. He resigned his position in March 1918 in protest of the Treaty of Brest-Litovsk and the subsequent entry of German troops into Ukraine. From April to October 1918 he led the Statistical Bureau and the Department of Education and Libraries in the Kherson Zemstvo.

In November, 1918, as Pavlo Skoropadskyi's Hetmanate was collapsing, Kedrowsky had an emergency meeting with Yevhen Konovalets and Fedir Chernyk of the Sich Riflemen. On November 15, he was appointed Chief of Mobilization and Quartermaster General for the army of the Directorate and promoted to colonel. He later took part in street battles against Bolshevik forces in Kyiv.

In early 1919 he was the military attaché of the UNR to the Ottoman Empire, and served as chairman of the commission investigating the "Oskilko Affair". In April 1919, Kedrowsky was named special operations commander under Oleksander Osetsky. His investigatory trips to the front left him so disappointed that he proposed the formation of an Army agency responsible for restoring order. Based on his proposal, a State Inspectorate was created by the UNR, and on May 16 received the command from Petliura to take the duties of Chief State Inspector of the Army of the UNR. In December 1919 he began a string of diplomatic assignments as UNR ambassador to Latvia, Estonia and Finland. In 1920 he was a UNR delegate at the Russian-Polish peace negotiations that lead to the Treaty of Riga, and in 1921 was a special military representative of the Directory and personal representative of Petliura to the Turkish government.

At the beginning the War, his wife Marta and their four children lived in Kherson with her parents. By the early 1920s, their children and the entire Odarik family had died, and Marta had rejoined her husband in the Baltics.

=== Exile ===
After the complete occupation of Ukraine by the Bolsheviks, a return by Kedrowsky and his wife to their homeland would have been suicidal. Instead, they settled in Baden, Austria, where he held the presidency of the Ukrainian Fellowship of Supporters of the League of Nations, and was elected vice-president of the Association of Ukrainian Journalists in Europe.

In December 1923, Kedrowsky and his wife immigrated to the United States. He first found employment in the residential building construction industry, and became active in Ukrainian-American organizations. In the late 1920s, he was a member of the School Council of the Association of Ukrainian American Organizations, which sought to reform and standardize the teaching of the Ukrainian language to Ukrainian-American children. Later, he purchased a farm in New Jersey, and worked as a film producer for the Ukrainian Canadian Motion Picture Company, as well as producer-director of Ukrainian live theater productions. Kedrowsky served as co-editor of the Svoboda newspaper from 1926 to 1933.

In March 1932, his wife Marta died, and in October 1932 Kedrowsky married Katherine Schutock (Shattuck). Katherine was a graduate of City College, and was active participant in the Ukrainian-American community, being a charter member and treasurer of the Ukrainian National Women's League of America. Their son George was born in 1936.

From 1941 to 1955 he worked for the General Cable Corporation in Perth Amboy, and from 1955 to 1963 he worked for the United States Department of State and served as the chief of the Ukrainian Service of the Voice of America. He died in Metuchen, and is buried in St. Andrew Memorial Cemetery in South Bound Brook, NJ.

== Documentary heritage ==
During his life, Kedrowsky amassed a major collection of stamps, coins, books, and archival materials. Portions of his library were donated to the Library of Congress, various universities, and the library of the Ukrainian Orthodox Church of the USA (now a part of the Ukrainian History and Education Center). His historically valuable archive (which includes correspondence with Symon Petliura) can now be found at the Ukrainian Academy of Arts and Science in the US, the Shevchenko Scientific Society, and the Ukrainian History and Education Center.
