= Strelkov =

Strelkov (Russian: Стрелков, from стрелок meaning shooter) is a Russian masculine surname, its feminine counterpart is Strelkova. It may refer to

- Alexandra Strelkova (1833–1902), Russian stage actress
- Denis Strelkov (born 1990), race walker
- Igor Strelkov (born 1982), Russian footballer
- Igor Girkin (born 1970), Russian military commander nicknamed "Strelkov"
- Inga Strelkova-Oboldina (born 1968), Russian theatre and film actress
- Natalia Strelkova (born 1961), Russian figure skater
