= Lev Streltsov =

Lev Mikhaylovich Streltsov
- Born: 25 October 1918; Mary, Turkmen SSR, Soviet Union
- Died: 24 March 1979; Odessa, Ukrainian SSR, Soviet Union
- Citizenship: Ukraine
- Known for: researching complex issues of sovereignty of national state formations in the composition of federal states
- Awards: 15 state awards, including: Order of the Red Banner, Order of the Red Star, Medal for Military Merit, Medal "For the Defence of Moscow", foreign state awards, etc.
- Scientific career
- Fields: a) state sovereignty, national sovereignty, people’s sovereignty, and b) issues of national state building on the example of Ukraine, the sovereign development of the legal status of a separate republic, the relation of sovereignty and jurisdiction of the federal republic and a separate state c) the basic principles and legal grounds for such a separation, and d) the extension of rights and authority of Ukraine as part of a federal state, and e) the constitutional system, the state law in countries with different types of organization of state power, the concept and features of the rule of law, etc.
- Institutions: Head of Department of State and Administrative Law of the Odessa State (National) University
- Website: http://www.onu.edu.ua

Lev Mikhailovich Streltsov (Ukrainian: Стрельцов, Лев Михайлович) (October 25, 1918 – March 24, 1979, Odessa) — Dr. Jur. Science, Professor, Head of Department of State and Administrative Law of I.I. Mechnikov Odessa State (now -National) University. Was awarded 15 state awards, including: Order of the Red Banner, Order of the Red Star, Medal for Military Merits, Medal for Defense of Moscow, foreign state awards, etc.

== Early life ==
Streltsov was born in Mary, Turkmen SSR, son of the locomotive driver of the Mary train depot station Mikhail Yemelyanovich Streltsov and housewife Nina Ignatyevna Streltsova. He was the youngest child in the family: older sisters Galina – born 1911, Thaisiya – born 1914, Nina – born 1916. After the sudden death of his father, M. Y. Streltsov, in 1924, the family moved to Tashkent, Uzbek SSR, where he graduated from high school and began working as a driver, and later as a mechanic of a motorcade.

== Military service ==
In October 1937, Streltsov was drafted into the Red Army, where he was trained as a tank mechanic-driver. In 1939, as a tank commander in the 7th Armored Brigade of the 57th Special Corps, he took part in the hostilities at the Battles of Khalkhin Gol in Mongolia. For the “demonstration of courage and heroism” he was awarded the Order of the Red Banner (№ 3791) by USSR Supreme Soviet Decree 28 August 1939. The Order was presented to him in Moscow by Chairman of the Presidium of the Supreme Soviet of the USSR M.I. Kalinin. After the end of hostilities, Streltsov was sent for further two years study at the Moscow Military School. As one of the best students he participated in the parade on Red Square in Moscow in 1940. After graduation, Streltsov received his first officer's rank. He took an active part in the Great Patriotic War, particularly in the defense of Moscow.

In general, Streltsov's military service developed as follows: tank mechanic-driver, tank commander, tank platoon commander, tank company deputy commander and commander, recon tank company commander, recon tank battalion deputy commander and commander, etc., commander various tank units of the North-Western, and other fronts. In 1942, receives the rank of Major (age 24) in 1946 (age 28) received a rank of lieutenant colonel. During the war, Streltsov was twice wounded and once suffered a concussion. In this regard, he was recognized as 2nd group invalid in 1954 (age 36) and was discharged rom the army. After that, from 1954 to 1956 he worked in organs of municipality

== Teaching activity ==
From 1956 to 1959 Streltsov worked at the Odessa branch of the All-Union Extramural Institute of Law (Moscow):Senior Lecturer, Head Lecturer and Deputy Director of the Branch. From 1959 to 1960, he was Senior Lecturer of the Faculty of Law of the Kiev branch of the University of Luhansk.

In 1960, since the beginning of the functioning of the Law Faculty of the Odessa University and until his death in 1979, Streltsov was working as: Senior Lecturer (1960–1963), Associate Professor (1963–1972), Vice-Dean (1964–1972), Professor (1972), Head of the Department of State and Administrative Law (1972–1979). He taught the normative course "Public Law" for students of all forms of education.

== Research activity ==
Research interests included the following issues (directions): a) state sovereignty, national sovereignty, people’s sovereignty, and b) issues of national state building on the example of Ukraine, the sovereign development of the legal status of a separate republic, the relation of sovereignty and jurisdiction of the federal republic and a separate state c) the basic principles and legal grounds for such a separation, and d) the extension of rights and authority of Ukraine as part of a federal state, and e) the constitutional system, the state law in countries with different types of organization of state power, the concept and features of the rule of law, etc.

During 1961 to 1962 he completed a one-year graduate program of the All-Union Extramural Institute of Law. In 1963 he defended his Ph.D. thesis: "Development of the Rights of the Union Republics (on the example of Ukraine)." In 1965 he gained the title of associate professor.

December 1969 – June 1970 took a 6-month sabbatical (creative) leave to complete his doctoral dissertation. In 1972 he defended his doctoral dissertation "Legal Status of a Union Republic (on the example of Ukraine)”. In 1975 gained the rank of professor.

Had more than 100 scientific and educational publications, including a monograph, 7 textbooks, etc. He had publications in foreign journals.

Monograph: Legal Status of a Soviet Republic. Sovereignty and Competence in State-Law Relations between the Union of the SSR and the Union Republics (on the example of Ukraine). Kyiv, "Vishcha Shkola", 1972. 144 p. Textbooks: Constitutional Rights of Citizens at the Present Stage. Textbook, Odessa State University publ., 1961. Correlation of the Sovereignty of the USSR and of the Union Republics. Textbook. Odessa State University publ., 1964. Administrative-territorial Structure of the Ukrainian SSR. Textbook. Odessa State University publ. 1966, etc.

== Social activity ==
Headed or served on scientific and practical councils that worked: a) at the Odessa Regional Council of Deputies and the Odessa Regional Executive Committee, and b) at the Odesa City Council of Deputies and the Odessa City Executive Committee. He headed advisory councils, which have cooperated with the deputies of Regional and City Councils, took part in the continued development of measures taken by them.

Took part in substantial patriotic work. He was a member of the Ukrainian Council of War Veterans. Carried out particularly active correspondence with veterans' organizations in Tula, and others. Kept in touch with the administration and students of the orphanage of Yasnaya Polyana. He was an active lecturer of the "Knowledge" society.

Was awarded state awards, repeatedly encouraged by Odessa Regional and City Councils of Deputies and Odessa Regional and City Executive Committee, Ministry of Higher Education of Ukraine, Odessa University named after II Mechnikov, the Law Faculty of the University, Union and republican veterans' organizations.

== Family ==
Wife – V. N. Streltsova, MD – Highest Category Neuro-ophthalmologist

Son – Yevgeny Streltsov, Dr. Jur. Science, Doctor of Theology, Professor, Corresponding Member of the National Academy of Legal Sciences of Ukraine

Daughter-in-Law – E. D. Streltsova, Ph.D., Associate Professor, Honored Worker of Education of Ukraine

Grandson – L. E. Streltsov. LLM Odessa National University, LLM Maastricht University

In Ukraine, the memory of Streltsov is honored. He is remembered in the Odessa National University. According to a special decision of the Academic Council of the University, one of the auditoriums on the Faculty of Economics and Law is named after him. International scientific conferences discussing issues of constitutional law, state building, and development of a legal state, dedicated to his memory were held in 2009, 2010 and 2012 at the University.

== Sources ==
1. Д.И. Кочетков. С закрытыми люками. М., Воениздат, 1962, с. 115–116

2. В.П. Горбатенко. Стрельцов Л.М. Он всегда был среди нас. «Времена и годы». Воспоминания ветеранов войны и труда Одесского университета. Т.1, Одесса, 1998, с.22-26

3. Одесский университет 1865 – 1990. Киев, изд-во «Либидь», 199, с.122–123.

4. Бабий Б.М. Очерки развития правовых исследований в Украинской ССР, 1919 – 1989. – Киев, Наукова думка, 1984. – 169.

5. Історія Одеського університету (1965 – 2000): Одеса, «АстроПринт», 2000, с. 113

6. Нудель М.А. Солдат, доктор наук// ЗНК, 1975.

7. Лев Михайлович Стрельцов: к 75-летию со дня рождения // Юрид. вестник. Научный журнал, Одесса, 1994, с. 44-46

8. Колмаков В.П. На піднесенні. Колектив юридичного факультету// ЗНК, 1971, 29 січня.

9. Національна академія правових наук України: довідник. – вид. 4-те, переробл. та допов. – Х.:Право, 2010, 376-378 с.

10. Історія Одеської національної юридичної академії/Головний редактор С.В. Ківалов; заст. головного редактора А.І. Паньков, Л.І. Кормич. – Одеса: Юридична література, 2002, с.56; Завжди поруч… Міжнародний науковий журнал: Влада. Людина. Закон, 2010, № 5, с. 16-22 и др.

11. Професори Одеського (Новоросійського) університету: Біогр. словник. Т.4: Р-Я. – 2-е вид., доп./ Відп. ред. В.А. Сминтина; Заступ. Відп. ред.. М.О. Подрєзова; упорядники та бібл.. ред.: В.П. Пружина, В.В. Самодурова. – Одеса: Астропринт, 2005, с. 176 – 181.
