= Samuil Shatunovsky =

Russian mathematician

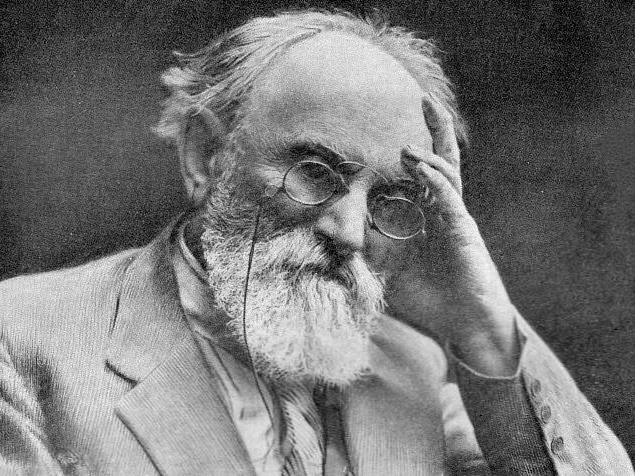
- Samuil Osipovich Shatunovsky
- Born: March 25, 1859; Velikaia Znamenka, Russian Empire
- Died: March 27, 1929 (aged 70); Odessa, Soviet Union
- Education: Imperial Novorossiia University
- Scientific career
- Fields: Mathematician
- Workplaces: Imperial Novorossiia University
- Doctoral students: Grigorii Mikhailovich Fichtenholz; Sofya Yanovskaya

Samuil Osipovich Shatunovsky (Russian: Самуил Осипович Шатуновский; 25 March 1859 – 27 March 1929) was a Russian and Soviet mathematician. He was born in Velikaia Znamenka, in a poor Jewish family as the 9th child. He completed secondary education in Kherson, then studied for a year in Rostov and moved to Saint Petersburg seeking a university degree. There he studied in several technical universities. Engineering however did not attract Shatunovsky and he dedicated himself to mathematics, voluntarily attending lectures by Pafnuty Chebyshev. Shatunovsky could not complete any university program due to lack of funds. He later attempted to obtain a university degree in Switzerland, but failed for the same reason. After returning from Switzerland, he lived in small Russian towns, earning by private lessons. In the meantime, he wrote his first mathematical papers and sent some of them to the Imperial Novorossiia University. Their quality was acknowledged; Shatunovsky was admitted to the university, received financial support, obtained a degree and was appointed as staff member in 1905. In 1917, he became a professor and continued working at in Odessa through the rest of his life.

Shatunovsky focused on several topics in mathematical analysis and algebra, such as group theory, number theory and geometry. Independently from Hilbert, he developed a similar axiomatic theory and applied it in geometry, algebra, Galois theory and analysis. However, most of his activity was devoted to teaching at Odessa University and writing associated books and study materials.

Shatunovsky died in 1929 from stomach cancer two days after his 70th birthday. Despite severe pain associated with his illness, he kept his usual sense of humor and continued to lecture almost until the day he died. He was remembered by his students and colleagues for his original approach to mathematical problems and ability to popularize the most complex mathematical ideas.
