= Margaret Willerding =

American mathematician (1919–2003)

Margaret Frances Willerding (1919–2003) was an American mathematician known for her combinatorial enumeration of quadratic forms, for her mathematics textbooks, and for her editorship of the problems department of the mathematics journal School Science and Mathematics.

== Early life and education ==
Willerding was born on April 26, 1919, in St. Louis, Missouri. After graduating from high school in 1936, she went to a local school, Harris Teachers College, despite being highly ambitious academically, because it was free; her parents were not especially supportive and could not afford a more expensive school. She majored in education there, with a minor in mathematics, and graduated in 1940.

After a year working as a schoolteacher, she went to Saint Louis University for graduate study in mathematics, choosing it as the best of the two universities local enough to allow her to continue living with her parents, and despite her mother's dismissal of her academic ambitions. During this time she continued working as a schoolteacher to support herself, before obtaining a fellowship in the final year of her program, the first woman to do so. She earned a master's degree in 1943 and completed her Ph.D. in 1947.

Her dissertation, Determination of All Classes of Positive Quaternary Quadratic Forms Which Represent All (Positive) Integers, was supervised by Arnold Ross,. A short summary of it was later published in the Bulletin of the American Mathematical Society, the main result of which being that "there are exactly 178 classes of universal classic positive quaternary quadratic forms". This was later found to be incorrect. Based on the use of the 15 theorem, Manjul Bhargava determined the correct number to be 204. As noted by John H. Conway, "Willerding’s work had been unusually defective. [...] she missed 36 forms, listed 1 form twice, and listed 9 non-universal forms!"

While she was still working on her doctorate, Ross moved to the University of Notre Dame to become department chair, and she commuted there by train to visit him. She became engaged to an older physicist at Notre Dame, Eugene Guth, but did not end up marrying him, and Ross's plans to hire her at Notre Dame also did not work out.

== Career and later life ==
After completing her doctorate, Willerding became a mathematics instructor at Washington University in St. Louis, beginning in 1947. She returned to Harris Teachers College and began focusing on mathematics education instead of mathematical research. During this time she also became active in the Missouri Section of the Mathematical Association of America.

In 1954 she started her work as mathematical problems editor for School Science and Mathematics, a position she held until 1976 despite a colleague undercutting her in the early 1960s by suggesting to the journal's editor-in-chief that she was too old for the position.

She moved in 1956 to San Diego State University, and retired as a professor emeritus in 1976. She died on December 29, 2003.

== Books ==
Willerding wrote over 30 mathematical textbooks. They include:

- The Business of Mathematics (Prindle, Weber & Schmidt, 1977)
- College Algebra and Trigonometry (with Stephen Hoffman, Wiley, 1971; 2nd ed., 1975)
- Elementary Mathematics: Its Structure and Concepts (Wiley, 1966)
- A First Course in College Mathematics: Module 4—The Integers and Their Operations; Equations and Inequalities; Squares, Square Roots, and Similar Triangles (Prindle, Weber & Schmidt, 1975)
- Mathematics: The Alphabet of Science (with Ruth A. Hayward, 2nd ed., Wiley, 1972)
- Modern Intermediate Algebra (2nd ed., Wiley, 1975)
- The Numbers Game (Prindle, Weber & Schmidt, 1977)
- A Probability Primer (Prindle, Weber & Schmidt, 1968)
