= Yevgeny Streltsov =

Ukrainian legal scientist and theologian

Yevgeny Lvovych Streltsov
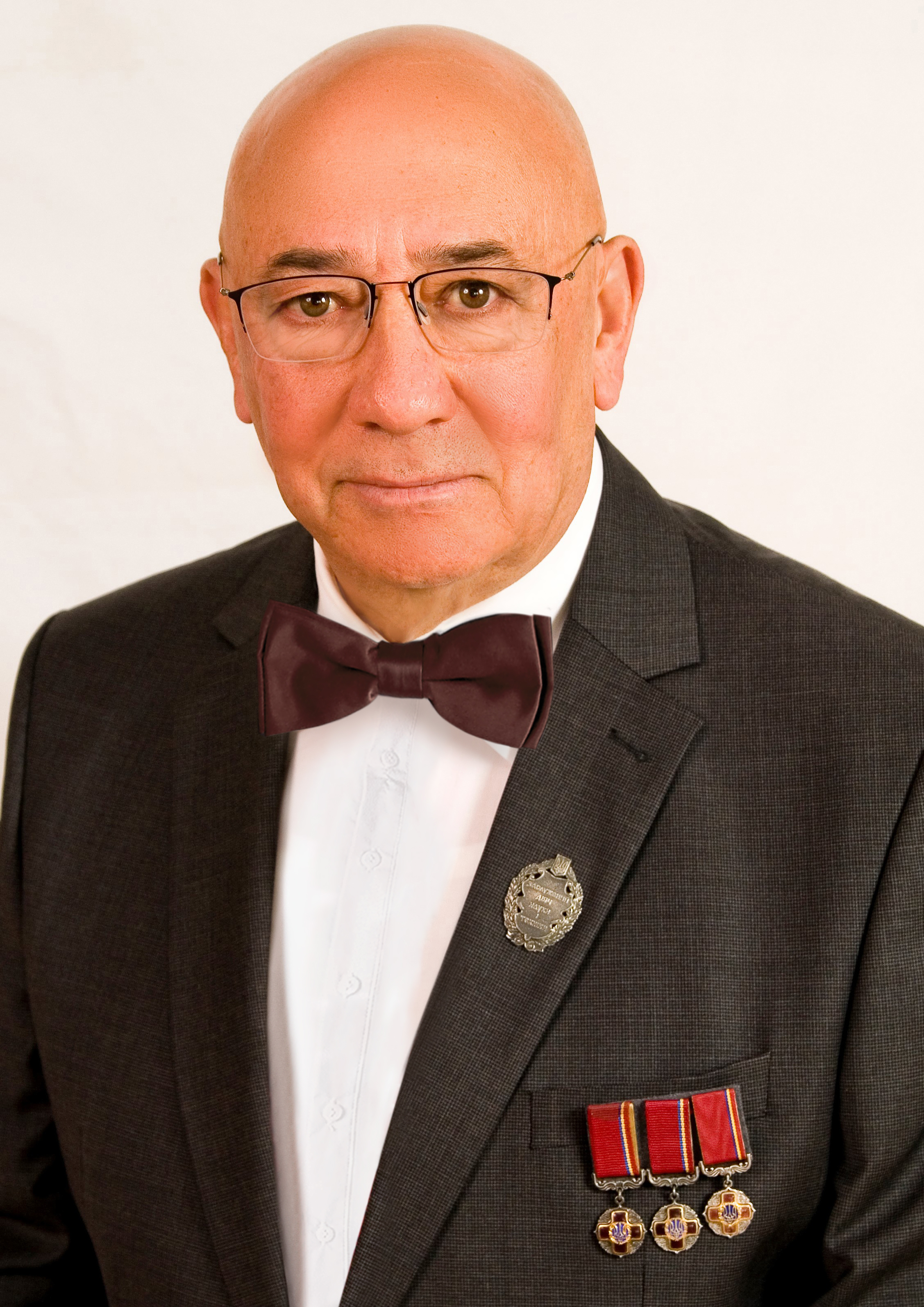
- Citizenship: Ukraine
- Scientific career
- Fields: Law
- Workplaces: National Academy of Legal Sciences of Ukraine (NALSU), Scientific Secretary of the Southern Regional Center of the NALSU

Yevgeny Lvovych Streltsov (Ukrainian: Євген Львович Стрельцов) is a Ukrainian scholar of law.

== Academic career ==
Streltsov graduated from the faculty of law at Odesa University, was a post graduate student of the Yaroslav Mudryi National Law University (1976–1980), where he received a PhD Degree in 1981, and became an associate professor in 1985. In 1989-92 he was a doctoral researcher at the Yaroslav Mudryi National Law University receiving a doctorate degree in the science of law (1992) and title of a professor (1995). In 2007-09 Streltsov also was a doctoral researcher of the Ukrainian Academy of Theology, receiving a Doctor of Theology (2010). In 2010 he was admitted as Corresponding Member to the National Academy of Legal Sciences of Ukraine.

Streltsov is the author of some 300 scientific works devoted to general and specific problems of law, including 5 monographs, including his book Economic Crimes: Domestic and International Aspects (foreword by Prof. Jess Maghan).

== Scholarly contributions ==
Streltsov is a founder and a leader of the scientific school (sector) Basic Institutions and Trends of the Development of Legislation in the Area of Criminal Law. He was a member of editorial boards for three Ukrainian and one foreign professional journals.

== Bibliography ==
- Textbook on Criminal Law of Ukraine, 8th edition (editor-in-chief and co-author) that received a special permission by the Ministry of Education and Science of Ukraine for studying at higher law educational institutions of Ukraine.
- Scientific and practical commentaries to the Criminal Code of Ukraine, 9th edition (editor-in-chief and co-author)
- Two scientific and practical commentaries to the Laws of Ukraine: On Principles of Prevention and Counteraction Corruption, On Advocacy, On Militia; etc. (co-editor-in-chief and co-author)
- Herald of the Southern Scientific Center of the National Academy of Legal Science of Ukraine, scientific journal (editor-in-chief)

== Foreign scholarships, awards and contributions ==
- Fulbright Scholar in the USA (1998-1999).
- DAAD (German Department for International Exchanges) Scholar (2001).
- The Max-Planck Academic Community (Germany) Scholar (2005, 2009, 2013)
