= Anatoly Rasskazov =

Soviet photographer

Anatoly Ivanovich Rasskazov (Russian: Анатолий Иванович Рассказов; 16 January 1941 – 17 February 2010) was a staff photographer and illustrator at the Soviet Chernobyl power station. He was the first person to photograph the 1986 Chernobyl nuclear disaster.

== Early life ==
Rasskazov was born on 16 January 1941 in Novoekonomichne, Krasnoarmeysk Raion, Donetsk Oblast, Ukraine.

== Documentation of Chernobyl disaster ==
On 26 April 1986, in the morning after the meltdown, he was sent by plant authorities, who gathered in a bunker and wanted to determine what had occurred, to photograph the scene from a helicopter. At approximately 15:03 on April 26th, 1986, He took the first photograph of the destroyed Unit 4. He was accompanied by two soldiers and two civilians from Atomenergo Moscow Advanced Training Institute. Back to the bunker, Rasskazov was ordered by Viktor Petrovich Bryukhanov, the plant director, to also take photos from the ground, shooting two rolls of film in total. The first roll of film was burnt out by the radiation. The second was only slightly damaged by the radiation. He also documented the building of the sarcophagus around the reactor. Most of his photos were never published. The ones that were chosen for reproduction were carefully chosen and/or edited to downplay the damage. Years later, they were published in a book without accreditation.

He suffered from burns and vomiting as early as after the first night and has had unhealed radiation burns on his forehead. His continued work around the reactor during the clean-up contributed further to his radiation poisoning, which he has blamed for his "ruined" health, which has included blood diseases and cancer.

== Death ==
Rasskazov died on 17 February 2010, "after suffering for years from cancer and blood diseases that he blamed on the radiation".
