= Alexandra Strelkova =

Russian stage actress

Alexandra Ivanovna Strelkova (Russian: Александра Ивановна Стрелкова, 1833–1902) was a Russian stage actress.

== Biography ==
Born in to a family of serf actors in Nizhny Novgorod, she was the sister of the actress Khioniya Talanova (1822–1880), who was a star at the Maly Theatre (Moscow) 1860–80. She acted on the stage in Nizhny Novgorod already as a child. In 1852, she debuted as an adult actress in Kazan. She became one of the most famed tragediennes in 19th-century Russia, and it was said, that during the 1850s and 1860s, her name was known from Tver to Astrachan. She toured all over Russia: Kazan, Oryol, Saratov, Odessa and Kiev. She performed at the National Theater in Moscow (1872), in Saint Petersburg at the Alexandrinsky Theatre (1878–82), and at the Malý Theater in Moscow (1891–92).
