= Isidor Natanson =

Soviet mathematician

Isidor Pavlovich Natanson (Russian: Исидор Павлович Натансон; February 8, 1906 in Zurich – July 3, 1964 in Leningrad) was a Swiss-born Soviet mathematician known for contributions to real analysis and constructive function theory, in particular, for his textbooks on these subjects. His son, Garal'd Natanson (1930–2003), was also a known mathematician.

== Selected publications ==
- Natanson, I. P. (1955). Theory of functions of a real variable. New York: Frederick Ungar Publishing Co. MR 0067952.
- Konstruktive Funktionentheorie. Berlin: Akademie Verlag. 1955.
- Natanson, I. P. (1964). Constructive function theory. Vol. I. Uniform approximation. Translated by Alexis N. Obolensky. New York: Frederick Ungar Publishing Co. MR 0196340. Zbl 0133.31101.
- Natanson, I. P. (1965). Constructive function theory. Vol. II. Approximation in mean. New York: Frederick Ungar Publishing Co. MR 0196341. Zbl 0136.36302.
- Natanson, I. P. (1965). Constructive function theory. Vol. III. Interpolation and approximation quadratures. New York: Ungar Publishing Co. MR 0196342. Zbl 0178.39701.
