= Odesa National University =

Public university in Odessa, Ukraine

Coordinates: 46.4875°N 30.7312°E

Odesa I. I. Mechnykov National University
- Одеський національний університет імені І.І.Мечникова
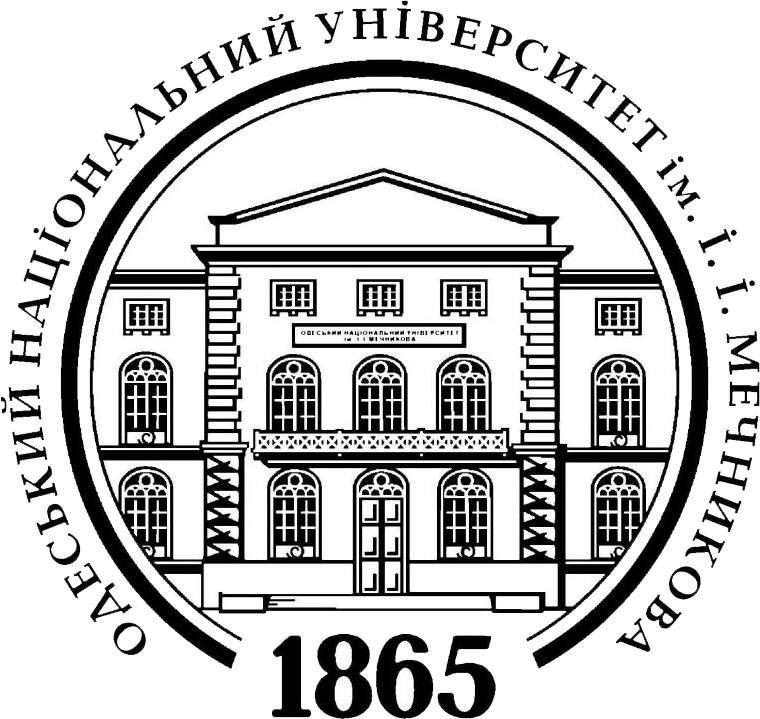
- University logo
- Former names: Imperial Novorossiya University (1865–1917); Odesa University (1917–20, 1933–45); Odesa I.I.Mechnykov State University (1945–1991)
- Type: Public
- Established: 1865
- Founder: Alexander II
- Administrative staff: 1800
- Students: 7,500
- Location: Odesa, Ukraine
- Campus: Urban, 70 hectares (170 acres)
- Website: www.onu.edu.ua

University rankings

Regional – Overall
- QS Emerging Europe and Central Asia: 166 (2022)

The Odesa I.I.Mechnykov National University (Ukrainian: Одеський національний університет Iмені І.І.Мечникова, romanized: Odeskyi natsionalnyi universytet imeni I.I.Mechnykova), often referred to as Odesa National University (abbr. ONU, Ukrainian: Одеський національний університет, ОНУ), located in Odesa, Ukraine, is one of that country's major state-sponsored universities, named after the scientist Élie Metchnikoff (1845-1916), who studied immunology, microbiology, and evolutionary embryology, and won a Nobel Prize in 1908. The university was founded in 1865 by an edict of Emperor Alexander II of Russia which reorganized the Richelieu Lyceum of Odessa into the new Imperial Novorossiya University. In the Soviet era, the university was renamed Odesa I. I. Mechnykov State University (lit. "Odesa State University named after I. I. Mechnykov").

Odesa I. I. Mechnykov National University comprises four institutes, ten faculties, and seven specialized councils. The university is famous for its scientific library, the largest and oldest of any university in Ukraine (3,600,000 volumes, dating from the 15th century to the present day).

== Background ==
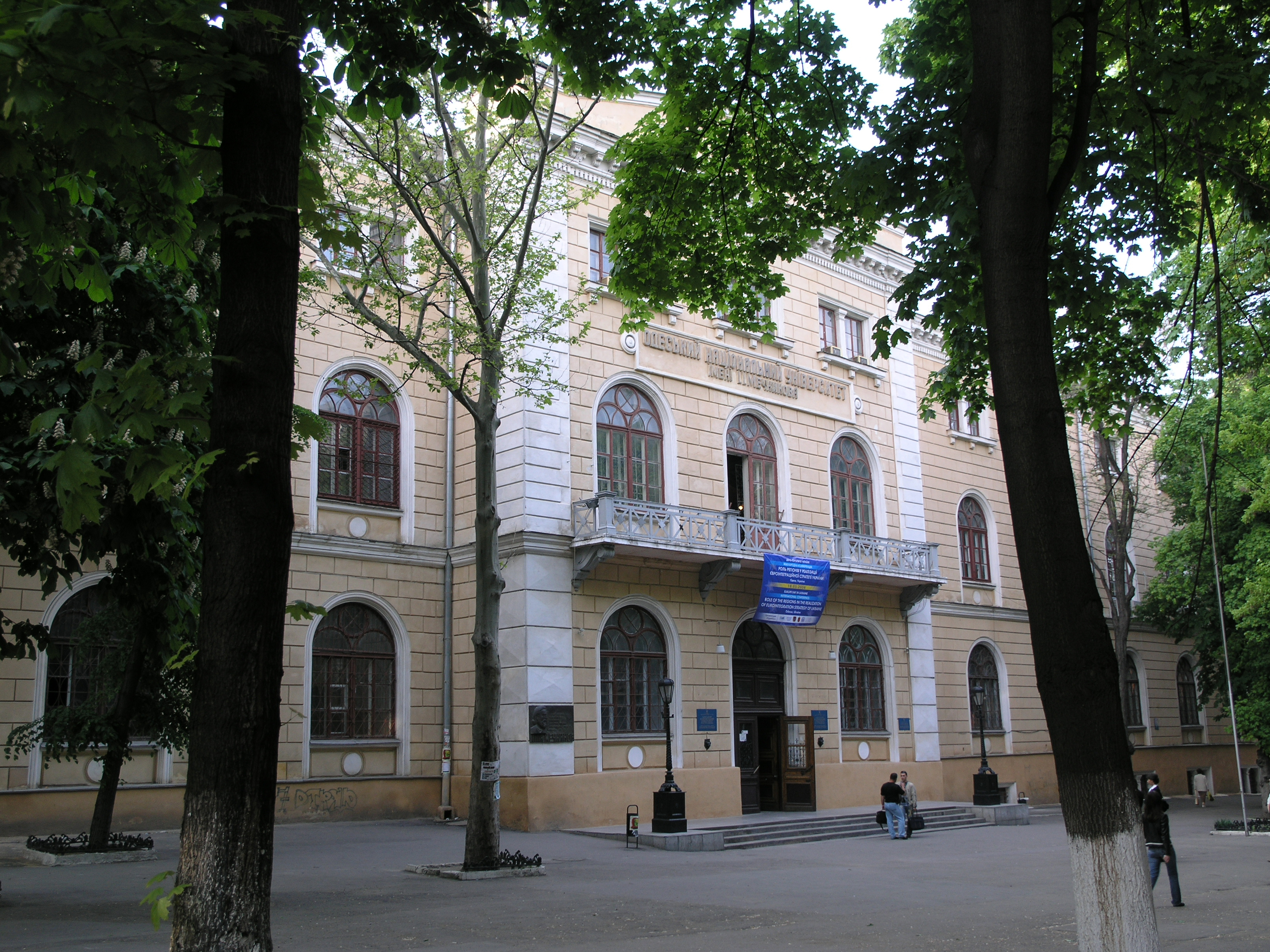
The main building of Odessa National University.

Odesa I. I. Mechnykov National University is one of the oldest in Ukraine. It was founded in 1865, when by edict of the Russian Tsar Alexander II the Richelieu Lyceum (Ukrainian: Рішельєвський ліцей, which had existed in Odesa since 1817) was reorganized into the Imperial Novorossiya (New Russia) University. All academic and scientific life of the university—from the day of its foundation—was directed by the statute of 1863 that formed the liberal-democratic tradition of the higher institution which has been preserved in spite of all the disturbances in the social and political life of the country.

The university was later renamed for Nobel Prize winner I. I. Mechnykov. The first Rector of the university was Professor I. Y. Sokolov. At different periods of time, the university was headed by Professors P. N. Lebedyev, A. I. Yurzhenko, A. V. Bogatskiy, V. V. Serdyuk, and I. P. Zelinskiy—all prominent specialists in different branches of knowledge.

In 2013, The Ukrainian Week stated that members of the university staff were openly Ukrainophobic.

== Organization ==
The university is situated in two parts of the city and occupies about 70 hectares. It is divided into a number of faculties that are directly administered by the university. The university consists of ten faculties, four institutes, one college, two "preparatory departments" for citizens of Ukraine and foreign countries, 15 scientific-research laboratories, five scientific institutes, administration departments, experimental training shops, and nine dormitories for students, post-graduates, and trainees. The university has a sports and health rehabilitation complex with its own stadium and rest-base for the students, personnel, and university guests in the village of Chernomorka. In all university locations there are cafeterias, cafes, bars, and medical sections.

=== Departments ===
- Faculty of Biology;
- Faculty of International Relationships, Politology and Sociology;
- Faculty of Economics and Law;
- Faculty of Geology and Geography;
- Faculty of History and Philosophy;
- Faculty of Journalism, Advertising, and Publishing;
- Faculty of Mathematics, Physics and Information Technologies;
- Faculty of Psychology and Social Work;
- Faculty of Romance and Germanic Philology;
- Faculty of Chemistry.

=== Other ===
- College of Economics and Social Work;
- University Preparatory Department;
- Preparatory Department for International Students.

=== Science ===
- 11 Scientific research laboratories;
- Botanic garden of ONU;
- Scientific-Research Institute of Physics;
- Astronomic Observatory.

== International cooperation ==
Odesa University has engaged in international cooperation at the regional and global levels for the past 150 years. The university is currently a member of the European University Association, the World Association of Universities, the Supervisory Board of Magna Charta, the Eurasian Association of Universities, the Black Sea Universities Network and the Danube Rectors Conference.

== Ranking ==
- 7th in Ukraine and 1844th in World, Ranking Web of Universities

== Notable alumni ==
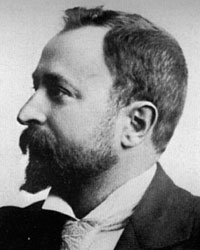
Aleko Konstantinov

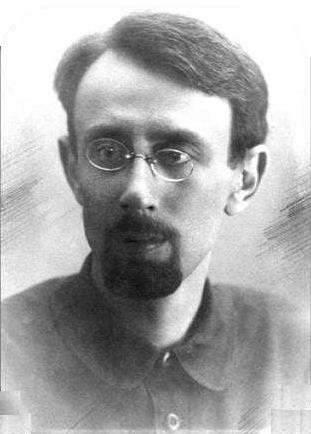
Lev Kritsman

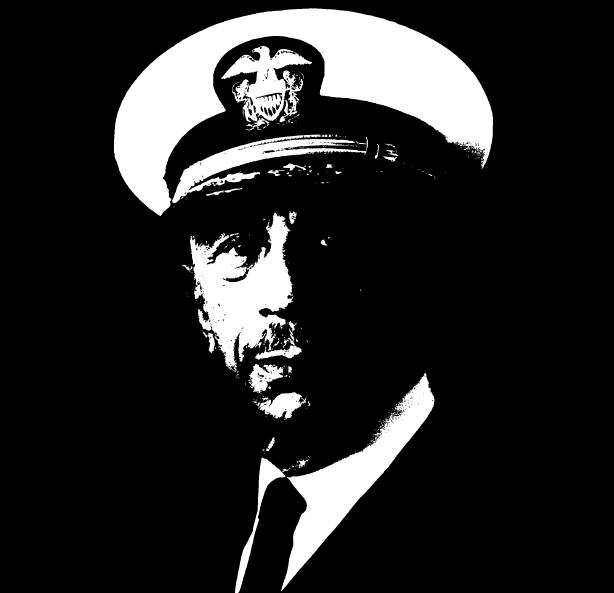
Joshua L Goldberg

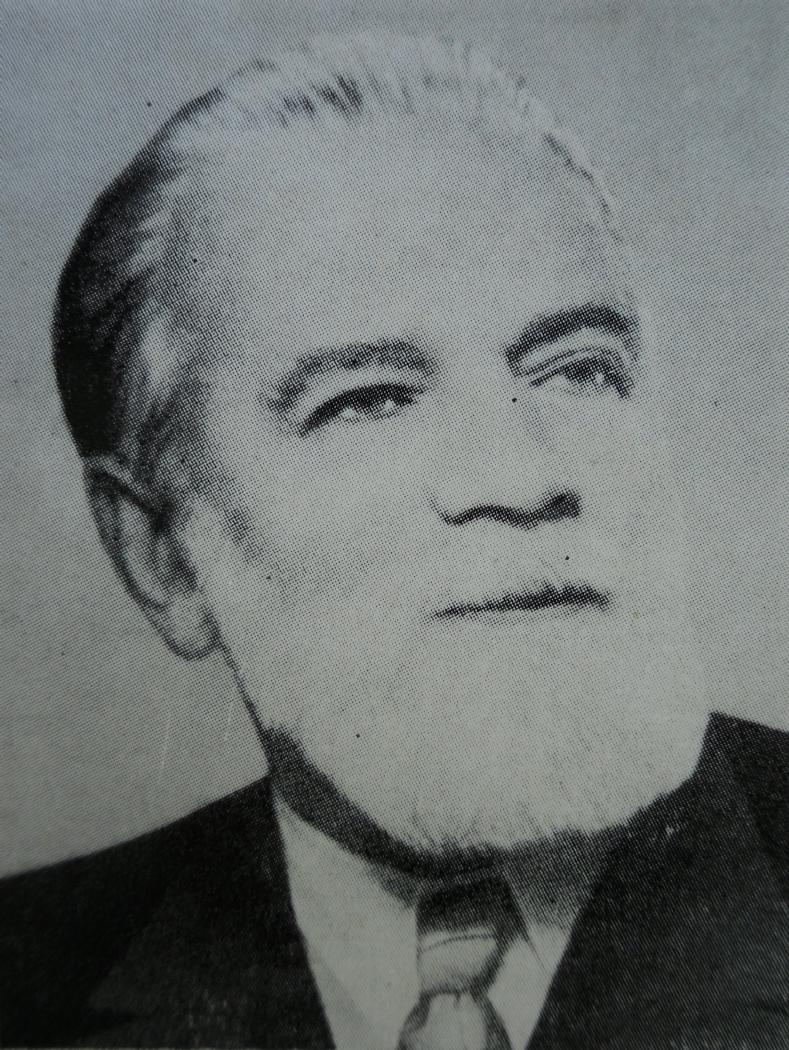
Grigorii Fichtenholz

- Ivan Sechenov (1829–1905) – Russian physiologist
- Nikodim Kondakov (1844–1925) – Russian historian
- Sergei Witte (1849–1915) – first prime minister of the Russian Empire
- Evgeny Kozubsky (1851–1911) – Russian-Dagestani scholar, educator, and public official
- Jan Śleszyński (1854–1931) – Polish-Russian mathematician
- Aleko Konstantinov (1863–1897) – Bulgarian intellectual who founded the tourist movement in Bulgaria
- Vladimir Lipsky (1863–1937) – Ukrainian botanist
- Danylo Zabolotny (1866-1922) – pioneer in microbiology
- Mariusz Zaruski (1867–1941) – brigadier-general in the Polish Army
- Krste Misirkov (1874–1926) – philologist, journalist, historian and ethnographer
- Ion Nistor (1876–1962) – Romanian historian and politician
- Leon Trotsky (1879–1940) – Russian revolutionary, chairman of the Petrograd Soviet
- Moses Schönfinkel (1888–1942) – Russian logician and mathematician
- Grigorii Fichtenholz (1888–1959) – mathematician
- Volodymyr Kedrowsky (1890–1970) – Ukrainian military leader, diplomat, author, and activist
- Lev Kritzman (1890–1938) – Soviet agrarian economist
- Georges Florovsky (1893–1979) – Russian Orthodox priest and theologian
- Nikolai Chebotaryov (1894–1947) – Ukrainian and Russian mathematician
- Gherman Pântea (1894–1968) – Bessarabian-born soldier, later Military Director of the Moldavian Democratic Republic
- Kadish Luz (1895–1972) – Israeli politician
- Joshua L. Goldberg (1896–1994) – Belarusian-born American rabbi
- Mordechai Namir (1897–1975) – Israeli minister
- George Gamow (1904–1968) – theoretical physicist and cosmologist
- Petro Karyshkovsky (1921–1968)– Ukrainian historian, numismatist
- Ali Mohamed Shein (born 1948) – 7th President of Zanzibar
- Alla Dzhioyeva (born 1949) – South Ossetian teacher turned politician
- Yevhen Streltsov (born 1949) – Ukrainian professor and scientist in law and theology
- Oksana Mas (born 1969) – Ukrainian artist
- Valeria Kuharenko (born 1927) – doctor of philological sciences
- Olga Hritsenko (1935–2020) – teacher, scientist
- Tetiana Vilchynska (born 1962) – linguist

== See also ==
- List of modern universities in Europe (1801–1945)
