= Alexander Rasskazov =

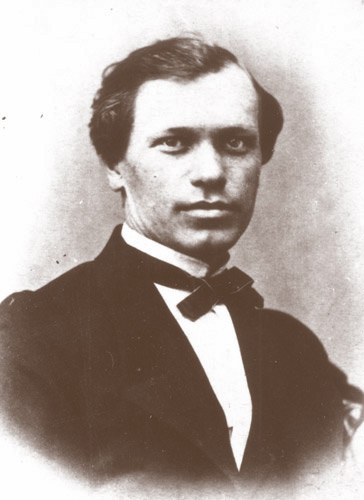
- Born: Александр Андреевич Рассказов; 1832; Moscow, Russian Empire
- Died: 28 July 1902 (aged 69–70); Moscow, Russian Empire
- Occupations: stage actor, theatre entrepreneur
- Years active: 1850-1902

Alexander Andreyevich Rasskazov (Russian: Александр Андреевич Рассказов, 1832, Moscow, Imperial Russia, — 28 July 1902, Moscow) was a Russian stage actor, one of the stars of the Moscow's Maly Theatre of his time, best remembered for his comic and vaudevillian parts, and considered an heir to Sergey Vasilyev's artistic legacy as well as the classic set of parts associated with the latter. He left Maly due to poor health but soon made himself a name as theatre entrepreneur in the Russian province, mostly in Samara, Tula, Kaluga and Simbirsk.
