= Alexander Streltsov =

Russian ice hockey player

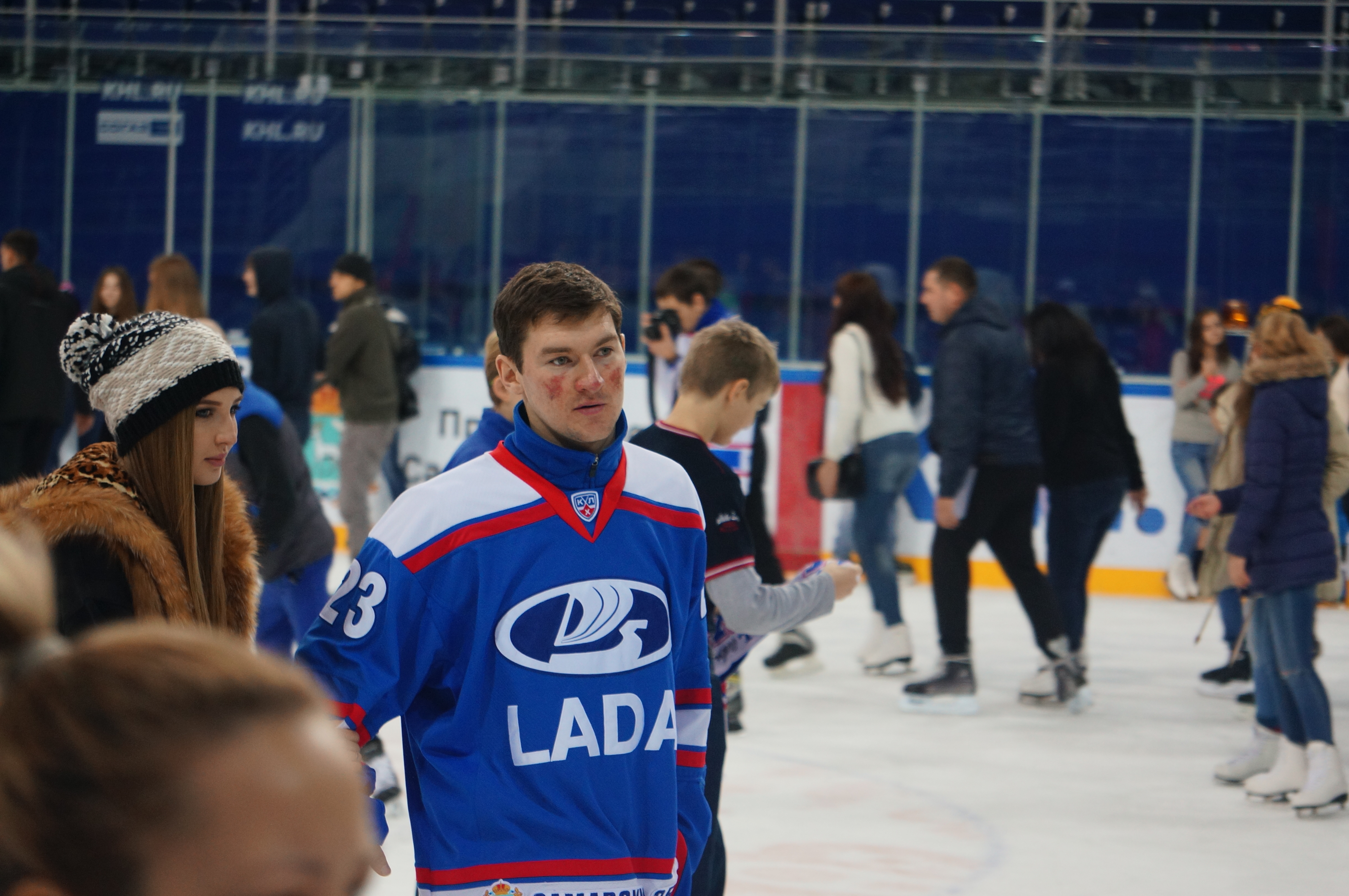
- Born: January 31, 1990 (age 36) Nizhnevartovsk, Russia
- Height: 5 ft 11 in (180 cm)
- Weight: 185 lb (84 kg; 13 st 3 lb)
- Position: Winger
- Shoots: Left
- VHL team Former teams: Sokol Krasnoyarsk; Avtomobilist Yekaterinburg; Lada Togliatti; Admiral Vladivostok
- Playing career: 2009–present

Alexander Streltsov (born January 31, 1990) is a Russian professional ice hockey defenceman. He is currently playing with Sokol Krasnoyarsk of the Supreme Hockey League (VHL).

Streltsov made his Kontinental Hockey League debut playing with Avtomobilist Yekaterinburg during the 2009–10 season.
