= List of foreign Russian Premier League players =

This is a list of foreign football players in the Russian Premier League.

The players had to play at least one league game to be included, the players who were signed by a Premier League club but only played in the Cup games, reserves team or in friendlies are not listed. The years listed are the calendar years the players played at least one league game in, if they did not play in a year, that year is not listed even if they played in Cup games or for the reserves that year or played in the previous/subsequent year that was the part of the same season. That includes the new signings who are not yet registered to play.

Players who originally played for a foreign national team but later played for Russia (such as Yuriy Nikiforov or Valery Kechinov) are not included. Players who originally played for Russia but later played for a foreign team (such as Aleksei Bakharev or Vladislav Lemish) are included.

Players who hold dual citizenship (including Russian) are included, unless they played for the Russian national team (including junior levels). The players who hold dual citizenship (none of them Russian) are listed under the country of their birth (if they have not played for any national team) or under the country they represented internationally (including junior levels). If a player represented more than one country internationally, he is listed under the country he represented last.

The players whose name is written in bold are on the 2025–26 squad lists in the league.

== Afghanistan ==
- Sharif Mukhammad – FC Anzhi Makhachkala – 2010–2014

== Albania ==
- Bekim Balaj – FC Akhmat Grozny, FC Nizhny Novgorod – 2016–2019, 2021
- Elvin Beqiri – FC Alania Vladikavkaz – 2005
- **Klisman Cake** – FC Akhmat Grozny – 2026
- Marvin Çuni – FC Rubin Kazan – 2024–2025
- **Mirlind Daku** – FC Rubin Kazan, FC Spartak Moscow – 2023–2026
- Enis Gavazaj – FC Yenisey Krasnoyarsk – 2018
- **Nazmi Gripshi** – FC Rubin Kazan – 2026
- Ilion Lika – FC Terek Grozny – 2008
- **Erald Maksuti** – FC Akhmat Grozny – 2026
- Mario Mitaj – FC Lokomotiv Moscow – 2022–2024
- **Belajdi Pusi** – FC Fakel Voronezh – 2025–2026
- Odise Roshi – FC Terek Grozny – 2016–2020

== Algeria ==
- Imadeddine Azzi – FC Dynamo Makhachkala – 2025
- **Mohamed Azzi** – FC Dynamo Makhachkala, PFC CSKA Moscow – 2025–2026
- Sofiane Hanni – FC Spartak Moscow – 2018–2019
- Raïs M'Bolhi – FC Krylia Sovetov Samara – 2011
- **Houssem Eddine Mrezigue** – FC Dynamo Makhachkala – 2024–2026
- Mehdi Zeffane – FC Krylia Sovetov Samara – 2020–2021

== Angola ==
- Bastos – FC Rostov – 2013–2016, 2021
- **João Batxi** – FC Krasnodar – 2022–2026
- **Egas Cacintura** – FC Ufa, FC Dynamo Makhachkala, FC Akhmat Grozny – 2021–2022, 2024–2026
- **Manuel Keliano** – FC Akhmat Grozny – 2025–2026
- Felício Milson – FC Pari Nizhny Novgorod – 2022
- **Miro** – FC Dynamo Makhachkala – 2025–2026
- Francisco Zuela – FC Kuban Krasnodar, FC Alania Vladikavkaz – 2009–2011

== Argentina ==
- Oscar Ahumada – FC Rostov – 2011
- Cristian Ansaldi – FC Rubin Kazan, FC Zenit St. Petersburg – 2008–2014
- Alejandro Barbaro – FC SKA-Khabarovsk – 2017
- **Esequiel Barco** – FC Spartak Moscow – 2024–2026
- Antonio Barijho – FC Saturn Ramenskoye – 2004
- Pablo Barrientos – FC Moscow – 2006–2008
- Adrián Bastía – FC Saturn Ramenskoye – 2004
- **Benjamín Bosch** – FC Orenburg – 2026
- Héctor Bracamonte – FC Moscow, FC Terek Grozny, FC Rostov – 2003–2012
- Fernando Cavenaghi – FC Spartak Moscow – 2004–2006
- Germán Conti – FC Lokomotiv Moscow – 2023
- Tino Costa – FC Spartak Moscow – 2013–2014
- **Ramiro Di Luciano** – PFC CSKA Moscow – 2025
- Alejandro Domínguez – FC Rubin Kazan, FC Zenit St. Petersburg – 2004–2009
- Sebastián Driussi – FC Zenit St. Petersburg – 2017–2021
- Leandro Fernández – FC Dynamo Moscow – 2006–2014
- Osmar Ferreyra – PFC CSKA Moscow – 2004–2005
- Gabriel Florentín – FC Orenburg – 2022–2024
- Pablo Fontanello – FC Ural Yekaterinburg – 2014–2016
- Adolfo Gaich – PFC CSKA Moscow, PFC Krylia Sovetov Samara – 2020–2025
- Ezequiel Garay – FC Zenit St. Petersburg – 2014–2016
- Walter García – FC Rubin Kazan – 2006
- Benjamín Garré – PFC Krylia Sovetov Samara – 2023–2024
- **Luciano Gondou** – FC Zenit St. Petersburg, PFC CSKA Moscow – 2024–2026
- Pablo Guiñazú – FC Saturn Ramenskoye – 2004
- Juan Manuel Insaurralde – FC Spartak Moscow – 2012–2015
- Matías Kranevitter – FC Zenit St. Petersburg – 2017–2019
- Juan Lescano – FC SKA-Khabarovsk, FC Anzhi Makhachkala – 2017–2019
- Gustavo Lillo – FC Krylia Sovetov Samara – 2002–2003
- Maxi López – FC Moscow – 2007–2008
- Mauro Luna Diale – FC Akhmat Grozny – 2024–2025
- Cristian Maidana – FC Spartak Moscow – 2008, 2010
- Emanuel Mammana – FC Zenit St. Petersburg, PFC Sochi – 2017–2021
- **Braian Mansilla** – FC Orenburg, FC Akhmat Grozny, FC Rodina Moscow – 2022–2026
- Lucas Masoero – FC Nizhny Novgorod – 2021–2023
- Patricio Matricardi – FC Rotor Volgograd – 2020
- Daniel Montenegro – FC Saturn Ramenskoye – 2004–2005
- Maximiliano Moralez – FC Moscow – 2007
- Tomás Muro – FC Orenburg – 2024–2025
- Franco Orozco – PFC Krylia Sovetov Samara – 2024
- Leandro Paredes – FC Zenit St. Petersburg – 2017–2018
- Nicolás Pareja – FC Spartak Moscow – 2010–2012
- Franco Parodi – PFC Spartak Nalchik – 2009
- Nicolás Pavlovich – FC Saturn Ramenskoye – 2003–2005
- Guillermo Pereyra – FC Lokomotiv Moscow – 2008
- Matías Pérez – FC Orenburg – 2023–2024
- Gustavo Pinto – FC Moscow – 2003–2004
- Ezequiel Ponce – FC Spartak Moscow – 2019–2021
- **Damián Puebla** – FC Orenburg – 2026
- Lucas Pusineri – FC Saturn Ramenskoye – 2003–2004
- Federico Rasic – FC Arsenal Tula – 2017–2018
- Gonzalo Requena – PFC Krylia Sovetov Samara – 2026
- Emiliano Rigoni – FC Zenit St. Petersburg – 2017–2020
- Clemente Rodríguez – FC Spartak Moscow – 2004–2006, 2008–2009
- Marcos Rojo – FC Spartak Moscow – 2011–2012
- **Pablo Solari** – FC Spartak Moscow – 2025–2026
- Valentín Vada – FC Rubin Kazan – 2023–2025
- **Román Vega** – FC Zenit St. Petersburg – 2025–2026
- **Lucas Vera** – FC Orenburg, FC Khimki, FC Lokomotiv Moscow – 2022–2026
- **Lionel Verde** – PFC CSKA Moscow – 2025
- Rodrigo Villagra – PFC CSKA Moscow – 2025

== Armenia ==
- Armen Adamyan – FC Chernomorets Novorossiysk – 1995
- Georgy Arutyunyan – FC Krasnodar – 2023
- Robert Arzumanyan – FC Amkar Perm – 2015
- Garnik Avalyan – FC Krylia Sovetov Samara, FC Shinnik Yaroslavl, FC Uralan Elista – 1993–2000
- Tigran Avanesyan – FC Tambov, FC Baltika Kaliningrad, FC Orenburg – 2021, 2023–2024, 2026
- **Artyom Bandikyan** – PFC CSKA Moscow – 2025–2026
- Khoren Bayramyan – FC Rostov, FC Rubin Kazan – 2011–2012, 2015–2026
- Roman Berezovsky – FC Zenit St. Petersburg, FC Torpedo Moscow, FC Dynamo Moscow, FC Khimki – 1996–2005, 2007–2009, 2012–2014
- Karen Dokhoyan – FC Krylia Sovetov Samara – 2000–2006
- Artur Galoyan – FC Baltika Kaliningrad, FC Akron Tolyatti – 2023–2025
- **Artur Gharibyan** – FC Rodina Moscow – 2025
- Pavel Gorelov – FC Rostov, FC Orenburg – 2020, 2025–2026
- Ara Hakobyan – FC Alania Vladikavkaz – 1999
- Varazdat Haroyan – FC Ural Yekaterinburg, FC Tambov – 2017–2020
- **Karlen Hovhannisyan** – FC Akron Tolyatti – 2026
- Sargis Hovhannisyan – FC Dynamo Moscow, FC Lokomotiv Moscow – 1992–1999
- Sargis Hovsepyan – FC Zenit St. Petersburg, FC Torpedo-Metallurg Moscow – 1998–2003
- **Ugochukwu Iwu** – FC Rubin Kazan – 2023–2026
- Manuk Kakosyan – FC Zhemchuzhina Sochi, FC Chernomorets Novorossiysk – 1997–2001
- Aleksandr Karapetyan – PFC Sochi, FC Tambov – 2019–2020
- Vardan Khachatryan – FC Torpedo Moscow – 1993
- Barsegh Kirakosyan – FC Khimki – 2009
- Sergey Kochkanyan – FC Rostov – 2020
- Arshak Koryan – FC Lokomotiv Moscow, FC Khimki – 2017, 2020–2021
- Ruslan Koryan – FC SKA-Khabarovsk – 2017
- Yervand Krbachyan – PFC CSKA Moscow – 1993
- Armen Manucharyan – FC Rotor Volgograd – 2020
- Edgar Manucharyan – FC Ural Yekaterinburg – 2013–2017
- Karapet Mikaelyan – FC Krylia Sovetov Samara – 1999–2000
- Hrayr Mkoyan – PFC Spartak Nalchik – 2012
- Arthur Mkrtchyan – FC Torpedo Moscow, FC Krylia Sovetov Samara – 1998–1999
- Karlen Mkrtchyan – FC Anzhi Makhachkala – 2013–2016
- Andrey Movsisyan – CSKA Moscow, FC Saturn Ramenskoye, FC Moscow, Luch-Energiya Vladivostok – 1996–1997, 2000–2006
- Yura Movsisyan – FC Krasnodar, FC Spartak Moscow – 2011–2015
- Aras Özbiliz – FC Kuban Krasnodar, FC Spartak Moscow – 2012–2015
- Eduard Partsikyan – FC Zhemchuzhina Sochi – 1999
- Artur Petrosyan – FC Lokomotiv Nizhny Novgorod – 1999
- Tigran Petrosyants – FC Zhemchuzhina Sochi, PFC CSKA Moscow, FC Torpedo-Luzhniki Moscow, FC Uralan Elista, FC Krylia Sovetov Samara – 1995–2000
- Marcos Pizzelli – FC Kuban Krasnodar, FC Krasnodar – 2012–2013
- Artur Sarkisov – FC Volga Nizhny Novgorod, FC Ural Yekaterinburg, FC Yenisey Krasnoyarsk – 2012–2014, 2018–2019
- Albert Sarkisyan – FC Lokomotiv Moscow, FC Torpedo Moscow, FC Alania Vladikavkaz, FC Amkar Perm – 1997–2006
- Edgar Sevikyan – FC Pari Nizhny Novgorod, FC Lokomotiv Moscow, FC Akron Tolyatti – 2022–2026
- Armen Shahgeldyan – FC Dynamo Moscow – 2000
- Artyom Simonyan – FC Torpedo Moscow – 2022
- Eduard Spertsyan – FC Krasnodar – 2020–2026
- Nair Tiknizyan – PFC CSKA Moscow, FC Lokomotiv Moscow – 2019–2025
- Erik Vardanyan – PFC Sochi – 2020
- Artur Voskanyan – FC Uralan Elista – 1999–2000
- Yeghia Yavruyan – FC Shinnik Yaroslavl – 2006
- Aramais Yepiskoposyan – FC Chernomorets Novorossiysk – 1995–1997
- David Yurchenko – Krylia Sovetov, Mordovia Saransk, FC Ufa, FC Anzhi Makhachkala, FC Tosno, FC Yenisey Krasnoyarsk – 2010, 2012–13, 2014–19
- Robert Zebelyan – FC Kuban Krasnodar, FC Khimki – 2007

== Australia ==
- Ivan Franjic – FC Torpedo Moscow – 2014–2015
- Luke Wilkshire – FC Dynamo Moscow, FC Terek Grozny – 2008–2014, 2016

== Austria ==
- Moritz Bauer – FC Rubin Kazan, FC Ufa – 2016–2017, 2021
- Markus Berger – FC Ural Yekaterinburg – 2014
- Darko Bodul – FC Amkar Perm, FC Yenisey Krasnoyarsk – 2016–2018
- Jakob Jantscher – FC Dynamo Moscow – 2012–2013
- **Aleksandar Jukić** – PFC Sochi, FC Rubin Kazan – 2024–2026
- Emanuel Pogatetz – FC Spartak Moscow – 2005
- Martin Stranzl – FC Spartak Moscow – 2006–2010

== Azerbaijan ==
- Ilgar Abdurahmanov – FC Anzhi Makhachkala – 2001
- Ruslan Abishov – FC Rubin Kazan – 2013
- Emin Ağayev – FC Torpedo-ZIL Moscow – 2001
- Tarlan Ahmadov – FC Fakel Voronezh – 2000
- Azer Aliyev – PFC Krylia Sovetov Samara, FC Ufa, FC Tambov – 2018–2021
- Kamran Aliyev – FC Khimki – 2020
- Arif Asadov – FC Spartak Vladikavkaz, FC Tyumen – 1994, 1998
- Deni Gaisumov – PFC CSKA Moscow, FC Terek Grozny – 1995, 1997, 2005
- Vali Gasimov – FC Spartak Moscow, FC Dynamo Moscow – 1992
- Elbeyi Guliyev – FC Ural Yekaterinburg – 2016
- Gurban Gurbanov – FC Fakel Voronezh – 2000–2001
- Ruslan İdiqov – FC KamAZ-Chally Naberezhnye Chelny – 1995
- Vagif Javadov – FC Volga Nizhny Novgorod – 2011
- Dmitry Kramarenko – FC Dynamo Moscow, FC Torpedo Moscow, FC Alania Vladikavkaz, PFC CSKA Moscow – 1993–2002
- Magomed Kurbanov – FC Rostov – 2012
- Vladislav Lemish – FC Kuban Krasnodar, PFC CSKA Moscow, FC Baltika Kaliningrad – 1992, 1994, 1997
- Vyacheslav Lychkin – FC Dynamo Stavropol, FC Tyumen – 1992, 1998
- Emin Mahmudov – FC Saturn Ramenskoye, FC Spartak Moscow, FC Tom Tomsk, PFC Krylia Sovetov Samara, FC Mordovia Saransk – 2010–2016
- Lev Mayorov – FC Chernomorets Novorossiysk – 1995–2001, 2003
- Filip Ozobić – FC Spartak Moscow – 2010–2011
- Kazemır Qudiyev – FC Zhemchuzhina Sochi – 1996–1997
- Emin Quliyev – FC Spartak-Alania Vladikavkaz – 2003
- Ramil Sheydayev – FC Zenit Saint Petersburg, FC Rubin Kazan, FC Krylia Sovetov Samara, FC Dynamo Moscow – 2014–2015, 2018–2019
- Mahir Shukurov – FC Anzhi Makhachkala – 2010
- Narvik Sırxayev – FC Anzhi Makhachkala, FC Lokomotiv Moscow, FC Moscow, FC Terek Grozny – 2000–2005
- Branimir Subašić – FC Amkar Perm – 2005
- Nazim Suleymanov – FC Alania Vladikavkaz, FC Zhemchuzhina Sochi – 1992–1998
- Aleksandr Zhidkov – FC Anzhi Makhachkala – 2000–2001

== Belarus ==
- Yury Afanasenko – FC Alania Vladikavkaz – 1998
- Mikhail Afanasyev – FC Amkar Perm – 2008–2009
- Dzmitry Aharodnik – FC Zenit St. Petersburg – 2000–2002
- Anton Amelchenko – FC Moscow, FC Rostov, FC Terek Grozny – 2007–2010, 2012–2014
- Syarhey Amelyanchuk – FC Lokomotiv Moscow, FC Shinnik Yaroslavl, FC Rostov, FC Terek Grozny, FC Tom Tomsk – 2005–2013
- Yury Antanovich – PFC CSKA Moscow, FC Rostselmash Rostov-on-Don – 1993–1998
- Andrey Astrowski – FC Dynamo Moscow, FC Moscow – 1997–2000, 2004
- Syarhey Balanovich – FC Amkar Perm – 2014–2018
- Eduard Baltrushevich – FC Fakel Voronezh – 2001
- Alyaksandr Baranaw – FC Rostselmash Rostov-on-Don, FC Lokomotiv Nizhny Novgorod – 2000
- Vasili Baranov – FC Baltika Kaliningrad, FC Spartak Moscow, FC Spartak-Alania Vladikavkaz – 1996–2003
- Dzmitry Barazna – FC KamAZ-Chally Naberezhnye Chelny – 1997
- Igor Belov – FC Luch Vladivostok – 1993
- Gennady Bliznyuk – FC Sibir Novosibirsk – 2010
- Valery Bocherov – FC Ural Yekaterinburg – 2024
- Maksim Bordachyov – FC Tom Tomsk, FC Rostov, FC Orenburg – 2013–2017
- Renan Bressan – FC Alania Vladikavkaz – 2013
- Vital Bulyga – FC Krylia Sovetov Samara, FC Uralan Elista, FC Amkar Perm, FC Tom Tomsk, FC Luch-Energiya Vladivostok – 2002–2008
- Dzmitry Chaley – FC Rostselmash Rostov-on-Don – 2002
- Alyaksandr Chayka – FC Alania Vladikavkaz, FC Krylia Sovetov Samara, FC Rostselmash Rostov-on-Don – 1998–2002
- Artyom Chelyadinsky – FC Sokol Saratov – 2002
- Ilya Chernyak – FC Akhmat Grozny – 2023
- Anton Chichkan – FC Ufa – 2022
- Alyaksandr Chysty – FC Lokomotiv Nizhny Novgorod, FC Amkar Perm – 1996–1997, 2004
- Andrey Chukhley – FC Ural Yekaterinburg – 2013
- Ruslan Danilyuk – FC Dynamo-Gazovik Tyumen – 1995
- Stanislaw Drahun – FC Krylia Sovetov Samara, FC Dynamo Moscow, FC Orenburg – 2013–2017
- Yegor Filipenko – FC Spartak Moscow, FC Tom Tomsk, FC Sibir Novosibirsk, FC Ural Yekaterinburg – 2008–2010, 2022–2024
- Vyacheslav Gerashchenko – FC Chernomorets Novorossiysk, PFC CSKA Moscow, FC Uralan Elista – 1995–2000, 2002
- Dmitry German – FC Tambov – 2021
- Artem Gomelko – FC Lokomotiv Moscow – 2011
- Boris Gorovoy – FC Zenit St. Petersburg, FC Torpedo-Metallurg Moscow – 1999–2003
- Valery Gromyko – FC Arsenal Tula – 2020–2021
- Sergei Gurenko – FC Lokomotiv Moscow – 1995–1999, 2003–2008
- Syarhey Herasimets – FC Baltika Kaliningrad, FC Zenit St. Petersburg – 1997–1999
- Alexander Hleb – FC Krylia Sovetov Samara – 2012, 2017
- Alyaksandr Hutar – FC Orenburg – 2016
- Pyotr Kachuro – FC Sokol Saratov – 2002
- Timofey Kalachyov – FC Rostov, FC Krylia Sovetov Samara – 2006–2019
- Dzmitry Kamarowski – FC Torpedo Moscow – 2005
- Kirill Kaplenko – FC Zenit St. Petersburg, FC Orenburg, FC Baltika Kaliningrad, FC Khimki – 2017, 2020, 2022–2025 (received Russian citizenship in 2018, switched international allegiance back to Belarus in 2022)
- Aleksandr Karnitsky – FC Tosno – 2017–2018
- Yegor Karpitsky – PFC Krylia Sovetov Samara – 2023
- Uladzimir Karytska – FC Rostselmash Rostov-on-Don, FC Saturn-RenTV Ramenskoye, FC Torpedo-Metallurg Moscow, FC Alania Vladikavkaz, FC Terek Grozny, FC Arsenal Tula – 2002–2005, 2015
- **Anton Kavalyow** – FC Fakel Voronezh – 2025–2026
- Yury Kavalyow – FC Arsenal Tula, FC Orenburg, FC Baltika Kaliningrad – 2020–2026
- Yury Khadaronak – FC Luch Vladivostok – 1993
- Vasil Khamutowski – FC Dynamo Moscow, FC Tom Tomsk, FC Amkar Perm – 2001, 2006–2007, 2011
- Andrey Khlebasolaw – FC Krylia Sovetov Samara – 1995
- Aleksandr Khrapkovsky – FC Sokol Saratov – 2002
- Syarhey Kislyak – FC Rubin Kazan, FC Krasnodar – 2011–2016
- Andrey Klimovich – FC Orenburg – 2019–2020
- Volodymyr Konovalov – FC Spartak Vladikavkaz – 1993
- Artem Kontsevoy – FC Spartak Moscow, PFC Spartak Nalchik – 2003, 2009
- Artem Kontsevoy – FC Ural Yekaterinburg – 2024
- Sergei Kornilenko – FC Tom Tomsk, FC Zenit St. Petersburg, FC Krylia Sovetov Samara – 2008–2019
- Andrei Kovalenko – FC Kuban Krasnodar, FC Rotor Volgograd, FC Rostselmash Rostov-on-Don, FC Fakel Voronezh – 1992–1993, 1996–1998, 2000
- Konstantin Kovalenko – FC Spartak Moscow, FC Zhemchuzhina Sochi, FC Alania Vladikavkaz, FC Chernomorets Novorossiysk, FC Saturn-RenTV Ramenskoye – 1996–2000, 2002
- Igor Kovalevich – FC Dynamo-Gazovik Tyumen – 1994–1995
- Leonid Kovel – FC Saturn Ramenskoye – 2008–2010
- Dzyanis Kowba – FC Krylia Sovetov Samara – 2000–2011
- Aliaksei Kuchuk – FC Kuban Krasnodar – 2009
- Alyaksandr Kulchy – FC Dynamo Moscow, FC Shinnik Yaroslavl, FC Tom Tomsk, FC Rostov, FC Krasnodar – 1997–1999, 2002–2007, 2009–2012
- Syarhey Lagutko – FC Krylia Sovetov Samara – 1996
- Leanid Lahun – FC Torpedo Moscow – 2001–2002
- Vital Lanko – FC Fakel Voronezh, PFC Spartak Nalchik, FC Luch-Energiya Vladivostok – 2001, 2006–2008
- Denis Laptev – FC Torpedo Moscow – 2022
- Andrei Lavrik – FC Lokomotiv Moscow, FC Amkar Perm – 1998–2001, 2004–2007
- Alyaksandr Lebedzew – FC Kuban Krasnodar – 2007
- Dmitry Lentsevich – FC Torpedo Moscow – 2006
- Vitaly Lisakovich – FC Lokomotiv Moscow, FC Rubin Kazan, FC Baltika Kaliningrad – 2020–2024
- **Anton Lukashov** – FC Orenburg – 2026
- Alyaksandar Lukhvich – FC KAMAZ-Chally Naberezhnye Chelny, FC Uralan Elista, FC Torpedo Moscow – 1997–2004
- Vladislav Malkevich – FC Ural Yekaterinburg – 2023–2024
- Mikhail Markhel – FC Spartak Vladikavkaz, FC Torpedo Moscow, FC Chernomorets Novorossiysk – 1993–1996
- Yuri Markhel – FC Alania Vladikavkaz – 2001
- Aleksandr Martynovich – FC Krasnodar, FC Ural Yekaterinburg, FC Rubin Kazan – 2011–2024
- Aleksandr Martyoshkin – FC Krylia Sovetov Samara, FC KAMAZ-Chally Naberezhnye Chelny – 1994–1995, 1997
- Ivan Mayewski – FC Anzhi Makhachkala, FC Rotor Volgograd – 2015–2016, 2021
- Alyaksandr Mazhavoy – FC Spartak Vladikavkaz – 1993
- Vladimir Medved – FC Rotor Volgograd – 2021
- Uladzimir Mihurski – FC Lokomotiv Nizhny Novgorod – 1992
- Dmitry Molosh – FC Sibir Novosibirsk, FC Krylia Sovetov Samara – 2010–2012
- **Ruslan Myalkovsky** – FC Lokomotiv Moscow – 2025–2026
- Pavel Nyakhaychyk – FC Dynamo Moscow, FC Tom Tomsk, FC Orenburg – 2011–2012, 2014, 2016–2017
- Alyaksandr Oreshnikow – FC Krylia Sovetov Samara, FC Lokomotiv Nizhny Novgorod – 1995–1998, 2000
- Radislav Orlovsky – FC Torpedo Moscow, FC Fakel Voronezh – 1997–2001
- Ihar Patapaw – FC Chernomorets Novorossiysk – 1996
- Aleksandr Pavlovets – FC Rostov, FC Orenburg – 2020–2022
- Kiril Pavlyuchek – FC Luch-Energiya Vladivostok – 2008
- Vadim Pigas – FC Pari Nizhny Novgorod – 2025–2026
- Denis Polyakov – FC Ural Yekaterinburg – 2019–2020
- Anton Putsila – FC Volga Nizhny Novgorod, FC Torpedo Moscow – 2013–2015
- **Kiryl Pyachenin** – FC Orenburg, PFC Krylia Sovetov Samara – 2022–2026
- Syarhey Pyatrukovich – FC Dynamo-Gazovik Tyumen – 1994
- Pavel Radnyonak – FC Dynamo-Gazovik Tyumen – 1994
- Artsyom Radzkow – FC Khimki, FC Terek Grozny – 2008, 2013
- Andrei Rapeika – FC Lokomotiv Nizhny Novgorod – 1996–1997
- Dzmitry Rawneyka – FC Torpedo Moscow, FC Rotor Volgograd – 2003–2004
- Miroslav Romaschenko – FC Uralmash Yekaterinburg, FC Spartak Moscow – 1994–1998
- Maksim Romashchenko – FC Dynamo Moscow, FC Khimki – 1997–2000, 2004–2006, 2009
- Mikalay Ryndzyuk – FC Lokomotiv Moscow, FC Lokomotiv Nizhny Novgorod – 1998–2000
- Andrei Satsunkevich – FC Lokomotiv Nizhny Novgorod – 1995–1997
- Aleksandr Sednyov – FC Chernomorets Novorossiysk, FC Baltika Kaliningrad – 1995, 1998
- Aleksandr Selyava – FC Rostov – 2022–2023
- Valeri Shantalosau – FC Lokomotiv Nizhny Novgorod, FC Baltika Kaliningrad, FC Torpedo Moscow – 1992–2000
- Igor Shitov – FC Dynamo Moscow, FC Mordovia Saransk – 2011–2016
- Aleh Shkabara – FC Dynamo Moscow – 2002, 2005
- Ilya Shkurin – PFC CSKA Moscow – 2020–2021
- Syarhey Shtanyuk – FC Dynamo Moscow, FC Shinnik Yaroslavl, FC Luch-Energiya Vladivostok – 1996–2000, 2003–2007
- Yuri Shukanov – FC Baltika Kaliningrad, FC KamAZ-Chally Naberezhnye Chelny, FC Uralan Elista, FC Fakel Voronezh – 1996–2001
- **Artyom Shumansky** – PFC CSKA Moscow, PFC Krylia Sovetov Samara, FC Akron Tolyatti – 2024–2026
- Uladzimir Shuneyka – FC Krylia Sovetov Samara, FC Spartak-Alania Vladikavkaz – 2000–2003
- Nikolay Signevich – FC Khimki – 2020
- Mikhail Sivakow – FC Orenburg, FC Amkar Perm – 2017–2020, 2022–2024
- Vadim Skripchenko – PFC CSKA Moscow – 2000
- Aleksey Skvernyuk – FC Krylia Sovetov Samara, FC Kuban Krasnodar, PFC Spartak Nalchik – 2005–2009, 2011–2012
- Mikhail Smirnov – FC Torpedo Moscow – 1993
- Andrey Sosnitsky – FC Spartak Vladikavkaz, FC Uralmash Yekaterinburg, FC Chernomorets Novorossiysk – 1992–1996
- Sergey Sosnovski – FC Tom Tomsk – 2011–2012
- Alyaksey Suchkow – FC Shinnik Yaroslavl – 2004
- Rodion Syamuk – FC Tambov – 2021
- Andrey Syarohin – FC Tyumen – 1997
- Ihar Tarlowski – FC Alania Vladikavkaz – 1998–2004
- Ihar Tsaplyuk – FC KamAZ Naberezhnye Chelny – 1993
- Yan Tsiharaw – FC Tom Tomsk, FC Lokomotiv Moscow – 2011–2015
- Gennady Tumilovich – FC Zhemchuzhina Sochi, FC Dynamo Moscow, FC Rostselmash Rostov-on-Don – 1998–2002
- Vital Valadzyankow – FC Sokol Saratov – 2002
- Maksim Valadzko – FC Arsenal Tula, FC Tambov – 2019–2020
- Raman Vasilyuk – FC Spartak Moscow – 2001–2003
- Sergey Vekhtev – FC Baltika Kaliningrad – 1997
- Sergey Veremko – FC Krylia Sovetov Samara, FC Ufa – 2011–2014
- Dzmitry Verkhawtsow – FC Krylia Sovetov Samara, FC Ufa – 2012–2015
- Andrei Viktorovich – FC Luch Vladivostok – 1993
- Zakhar Volkov – FC Khimki – 2022, 2024
- Uladzimir Vostrykaw – FC Chernomorets Novorossiysk – 1997
- Valery Vyalichka – FC Spartak Moscow, FC Lokomotiv Nizhny Novgorod – 1995–1996
- Alyaksandr Vyazhevich – FC Chernomorets Novorossiysk – 1997
- Erik Yakhimovich – FC Dynamo Moscow – 1994–2000
- Syarhey Yaskovich – FC Anzhi Makhachkala, FC Moscow, FC Tom Tomsk – 2000–2001, 2004–2005
- Vladimir Yurchenko – FC Saturn Ramenskoye – 2008–2009
- Roman Yuzepchuk – FC Torpedo Moscow – 2023
- Maksim Zhavnerchik – FC Kuban Krasnodar – 2009, 2011–2014
- Yuri Zhevnov – FC Moscow, FC Zenit St. Petersburg, FC Torpedo Moscow, FC Ural Yekaterinburg – 2005–2015
- Uladzimir Zhuravel – FC Zhemchuzhina Sochi – 1998–1999
- **Kirill Zinovich** – FC Lokomotiv Moscow, FC Dynamo Makhachkala – 2021, 2024–2026
- Nikolay Zolotov – FC Ural Yekaterinburg – 2020

== Belgium ==
- Gianni Bruno – FC Krylia Sovetov Samara – 2016–2017
- Maximiliano Caufriez – FC Spartak Moscow – 2021–2022
- Danilo – FC Mordovia Saransk – 2014–2015
- Jonathan Legear – FC Terek Grozny – 2011–2013
- Maxime Lestienne – FC Rubin Kazan – 2016–2017
- Nicolas Lombaerts – FC Zenit St. Petersburg – 2007–2017
- Cédric Roussel – FC Rubin Kazan – 2004
- Jeroen Simaeys – FC Krylia Sovetov Samara – 2015–2016
- Axel Witsel – FC Zenit St. Petersburg – 2012–2016

== Bolivia ==
- Juan Carlos Arce – FC Terek Grozny – 2010
- **Roberto Fernández** – FC Baltika Kaliningrad, FC Akron Tolyatti – 2023–2026
- **Yomar Rocha** – FC Akron Tolyatti – 2025–2026

== Bosnia and Herzegovina ==
- Mersudin Ahmetović – FC Rostov, FC Volga Nizhny Novgorod – 2009–2012
- Ricardo Baiano – FC Kuban Krasnodar, PFC Spartak Nalchik, FC Moscow – 2004, 2007–2009
- Ivan Bašić – FC Orenburg – 2022–2025
- Džemal Berberović – FC Kuban Krasnodar – 2007
- Dragan Blatnjak – FC Khimki, FC Rostov – 2007–2012
- Jasmin Čeliković – FC Akhmat Grozny – 2023–2024
- **Eldar Ćivić** – FC Baltika Kaliningrad – 2025–2026
- Dario Damjanović – FC Luch-Energiya Vladivostok – 2008
- Ifet Đakovac – FC Akron Tolyatti – 2025–2026
- Goran Drmić – FC Krylia Sovetov Samara – 2010
- Samir Duro – FC Saturn-RenTV Ramenskoye – 2003
- Nenad Gagro – FC Saturn-RenTV Ramenskoye – 2002
- Armin Gigović – FC Rostov – 2020–2022
- Renato Gojković – FC Orenburg – 2022–2024
- Vladan Grujić – FC Alania Vladikavkaz – 2005
- **Gedeon Guzina** – FC Baltika Kaliningrad, FC Orenburg – 2023–2026
- Dennis Hadžikadunić – FC Rostov – 2018–2021
- Said Hamulić – FC Lokomotiv Moscow – 2024
- Amir Hamzić – FC Anzhi Makhachkala – 2002
- Haris Handžić – FC Ufa – 2014–2016
- Hidajet Hankić – FC Rostov – 2024, 2026
- Dženan Hošić – FC Anzhi Makhachkala – 2000–2002
- Senijad Ibričić – FC Lokomotiv Moscow – 2011–2012
- Petar Jelić – FC Volga Nizhny Novgorod – 2012
- Omer Joldić – FC Saturn Ramenskoye – 2001–2002
- Mario Jurić – FC Shinnik Yaroslavl, PFC Spartak Nalchik – 2004–2006
- Miro Katić – FC Torpedo-Metallurg Moscow – 2003
- Zehrudin Kavazović – FC Anzhi Makhachkala – 2001
- **Stefan Kovač** – FC Baltika Kaliningrad – 2025–2026
- Branislav Krunić – FC Tom Tomsk, FC Moscow – 2005–2009
- Edis Kurtić – FC Torpedo-ZIL Moscow – 2001
- Josip Lukačević – FC Luch-Energiya Vladivostok – 2008
- Ajdin Maksumić – FC Khimki – 2007
- Darko Maletić – FC Zenit St. Petersburg, FC Shinnik Yaroslavl – 2004–2005
- Zvjezdan Misimović – FC Dynamo Moscow – 2011–2012
- Amel Mujčinović – FC Anzhi Makhachkala – 2002
- Samir Muratović – FC Saturn Ramenskoye – 2001–2003
- Srđan Pecelj – FC Sokol Saratov – 2001
- Miralem Pjanić – PFC CSKA Moscow – 2024–2025
- Elvir Rahimić – FC Anzhi Makhachkala, PFC CSKA Moscow – 2000–2013
- **Amar Rahmanović** – PFC Krylia Sovetov Samara – 2022–2026
- Senad Repuh – FC Sokol Saratov – 2001–2002
- Munever Rizvić – FC Moscow – 2001–2004
- Miloš Šatara – FC Akhmat Grozny – 2023–2025
- Igor Savić – FC Torpedo Moscow – 2022–2023
- Kabir Smajić – FC Saturn Ramenskoye – 2001
- Emir Spahić – FC Shinnik Yaroslavl, FC Torpedo Moscow, FC Lokomotiv Moscow, FC Anzhi Makhachkala – 2004–2008, 2013
- Dragan Stojkić – FC Luch-Energiya Vladivostok – 2008
- Toni Šunjić – FC Kuban Krasnodar, FC Dynamo Moscow – 2014–2015, 2017–2020
- **Darko Todorović** – FC Akhmat Grozny, FC Fakel Voronezh – 2021–2026
- Marko Topić – FC Krylia Sovetov Samara, FC Saturn Moscow Oblast – 2005–2010
- Vule Trivunović – FC Khimki – 2007–2009
- Ognjen Vranješ – FC Krasnodar, FC Alania Vladikavkaz, FC Tom Tomsk – 2011–2013, 2016
- Aleksandar Vrhovac – FC Krylia Sovetov Samara – 1999–2000
- Adnan Zahirović – PFC Spartak Nalchik – 2011–2012
- Hadis Zubanović – FC Anzhi Makhachkala – 2002

== Brazil ==
- Adílson – FC Terek Grozny – 2012–2016
- Luiz Adriano – FC Spartak Moscow – 2017–2019
- Aílton – FC Terek Grozny – 2012–2015
- Alberto – FC Dynamo Moscow – 2003–2004
- Carlos Alberto – FC Torpedo-Luzhniki Moscow – 1997
- Alerrandro – PFC CSKA Moscow – 2025
- Alex – FC Spartak Moscow – 2009–2011
- **Alexandre Jesus** – FC Orenburg – 2025–2026
- Aloísio – FC Rubin Kazan – 2003–2004
- Yuri Alberto – FC Zenit Saint Petersburg – 2022
- Alex Alves – FC Saturn Ramenskoye – 2004
- André Alves – FC Luch-Energiya Vladivostok – 2008
- Marcelo Alves – PFC Sochi – 2023–2026
- **Matheus Alves** – PFC CSKA Moscow – 2025–2026
- Léo Andrade – FC Khimki – 2023
- Ângelo – FC Krylia Sovetov Samara, FC Alania Vladikavkaz – 2001–2002
- Apodi – FC Kuban Krasnodar – 2016
- Ari – FC Spartak Moscow, FC Krasnodar, FC Lokomotiv Moscow – 2010–2018 (received Russian citizenship in 2018, called up to the Russia national team)
- Artur – FC Zenit St. Petersburg – 2024
- **Douglas Augusto** – FC Krasnodar – 2025–2026
- Fábio Augusto – FC Chernomorets Novorossiysk – 2003
- **Felipe Augusto** – FC Zenit Saint Petersburg – 2026
- Gabriel Atz – FC Rubin Kazan, FC Khimki – 2006–2008
- Baiano – FC Rubin Kazan – 2006
- Helio Batista – FC Alania Vladikavkaz – 1999
- **Rodrigo Becão** – PFC CSKA Moscow, FC Rodina Moscow – 2018–2019, 2026
- **Bitello** – FC Dynamo Moscow – 2023–2026
- William Boaventura – FC Kuban Krasnodar – 2009
- Pedro Botelho – FC Krylia Sovetov Samara – 2007
- Ricardo Bóvio – FC Chernomorets Novorossiysk – 2003
- Brener – FC Uralan Elista – 2000
- Calisto – FC Rubin Kazan – 2003–2007
- Camilo – FC Akhmat Grozny – 2023–2024
- Rafael Carioca – FC Spartak Moscow – 2009, 2011–2014
- Diego Carlos – FC Ufa – 2014–2016
- Jean Carlos – FC Amkar Perm – 2009–2010
- Carlos Eduardo – FC Rubin Kazan – 2010, 2012, 2014–2016
- Carlos Roberto – FC Rostov – 2003
- Cardoso – FC Alania Vladikavkaz – 2012
- Felippe Cardoso – FC Akhmat Grozny – 2024
- **Henrique Carmo** – PFC CSKA Moscow – 2025–2026
- Anderson Carvalho – FC Tosno – 2017
- Daniel Carvalho – PFC CSKA Moscow – 2004–2009
- Cassiano – FC Uralan Elista – 2000
- Celsinho – FC Lokomotiv Moscow – 2006
- Júlio César – FC Lokomotiv Moscow – 2002–2003
- Charles – FC Lokomotiv Moscow – 2008–2010
- **Christian** – FC Krasnodar – 2026
- Claudinho – FC Zenit St. Petersburg – 2021–2024 (received Russian citizenship in 2023)
- **Clayton** – FC Fakel Voronezh – 2026
- Cléber – FC Terek Grozny – 2009
- Diego Costa – FC Krasnodar – 2024–2026
- Fábio Costa – FC Chernomorets Novorossiysk – 2003
- **Fernando Costanza** – PFC Krylia Sovetov Samara – 2022–2026
- Da Silva – FC Saturn-RenTV Ramenskoye – 2003
- Da Silva – FC Lokomotiv Nizhny Novgorod – 1995
- Daniel Júnior – FC Akhmat Grozny – 2023
- Danielson – FC Khimki – 2008
- Danilo – FC Kuban Krasnodar – 2014
- Derik – FC Baltika Kaliningrad – 2026
- Derlei – FC Dynamo Moscow – 2005–2006
- André Dias – FC Spartak Moscow – 2003
- Dudu – PFC CSKA Moscow – 2005–2008
- **Dudu Rodrigues** – FC Akron Tolyatti – 2026
- Edu – FC Alania Vladikavkaz, FC Krylia Sovetov Samara, FC Anzhi Makhachkala – 1998–2001
- Élson – FC Rostov – 2011–2012
- Paulo Emilio – FC Alania Vladikavkaz – 1998–2002
- Ewerton – FC Anzhi Makhachkala – 2012–2014
- Ewerthon – FC Terek Grozny – 2011
- **Lucas Fasson** – FC Lokomotiv Moscow – 2022–2026
- Felipe – PFC Spartak Nalchik – 2008–2009
- André Felipe – FC Torpedo Moscow – 2023
- Alex Fernandes – FC Baltika Kaliningrad – 2024
- Mário Fernandes – PFC CSKA Moscow – 2012–2016 (received Russian citizenship in 2016, called up to the Russia national team)
- Fernando – FC Spartak Moscow – 2016–2019
- Antonio Ferreira – PFC Spartak Nalchik, FC Terek Grozny – 2009–2014
- Fininho – FC Lokomotiv Moscow – 2006–2009
- Flamarion – FC Rotor Volgograd – 2020–2021
- Flávio – FC Chernomorets Novorossiysk – 2003
- Bruno Fuchs – PFC CSKA Moscow – 2020–2022
- Gustavo Furtado – FC Krasnodar, PFC Sochi – 2025–2026
- Gaúcho – FC Krylia Sovetov Samara – 2002–2003
- Éder Gaúcho – FC Terek Grozny – 2005
- Géder – FC Saturn Ramenskoye, FC Spartak Moscow – 2003–2007
- Gelson – FC Shinnik Yaroslavl – 2004
- Gerson – FC Zenit St. Petersburg – 2025
- Giuliano – FC Zenit St. Petersburg – 2016–2017
- **Arthur Gomes** – FC Dynamo Moscow – 2024–2026
- Guilherme – PFC CSKA Moscow – 2009–2010
- Guilherme – FC Lokomotiv Moscow – 2009–2014 (received Russian citizenship in 2015, called up to the Russia national team)
- Marcos Guilherme – FC Khimki – 2023
- Guilherme Schettine – FC Ural Yekaterinburg – 2023–2024
- **Luiz Henrique** – FC Zenit St. Petersburg – 2025–2026
- Hernani – FC Zenit St. Petersburg – 2017–2019
- Hulk – FC Zenit St. Petersburg – 2012–2016
- Ibson – FC Spartak Moscow – 2009–2011
- Ilson – FC Shinnik Yaroslavl – 2004
- Isael – FC Krasnodar – 2013–2014
- **Ismael** – FC Akhmat Grozny – 2017–2021, 2024–2026
- Ítalo – FC Ural Yekaterinburg – 2023–2024
- Léo Jabá – FC Akhmat Grozny – 2017–2018
- Jaílson – FC Rubin Kazan – 2007
- Jajá – FC Torpedo Moscow – 2023
- Jean – FC Saturn Ramenskoye, FC Dynamo Moscow, FC Rubin Kazan – 2004–2007
- Jean – FC Saturn Ramenskoye – 2005–2006
- Jefferson – FC Alania Vladikavkaz, FC Uralan Elista – 1999–2000
- Jefthon – FC Kuban Krasnodar, PFC Spartak Nalchik, FC Rubin Kazan – 2004, 2006–2008
- Ricardo Jesus – PFC Spartak Nalchik, PFC CSKA Moscow – 2007–2010
- Jô – PFC CSKA Moscow – 2006–2008
- João Carlos – FC Anzhi Makhachkala, FC Spartak Moscow – 2011–2015
- Joãozinho – FC Krasnodar, FC Dynamo Moscow, PFC Sochi – 2011–2023 (received Russian citizenship in 2016)
- **Jhon Jhon** – FC Zenit Saint Petersburg – 2026
- Jonathas – FC Rubin Kazan – 2016–2017
- Jorginho – FC Krylia Sovetov Samara – 1999
- **Jubal** – FC Krasnodar – 2025–2026
- Junior – FC Lokomotiv Nizhny Novgorod – 1995–1996
- Jucilei – FC Anzhi Makhachkala – 2011–2013
- Kady – FC Krasnodar – 2023–2024
- Kaio – FC Krasnodar – 2019–2025
- Kanu – FC Terek Grozny – 2013–2016
- Pedro Ken – FC Terek Grozny – 2016
- Khellven – PFC CSKA Moscow – 2023–2025
- Leandro – FC Lokomotiv Moscow – 2003–2004
- Leandro – FC Saturn Ramenskoye – 2004
- Leandro da Silva – FC Luch-Energiya Vladivostok, PFC Spartak Nalchik, FC Kuban Krasnodar, FC Volga Nizhny Novgorod – 2008–2011, 2013–2014
- Leilton – FC Krylia Sovetov Samara, FC Shinnik Yaroslavl, FC Volga Nizhny Novgorod – 2003–2011
- Leonardo – FC Anzhi Makhachkala – 2015
- Leonidas – PFC CSKA Moscow, FC Torpedo-Luzhniki Moscow – 1996–1997
- Francisco Lima – FC Lokomotiv Moscow, FC Dynamo Moscow – 2004–2006
- David Lopes – FC Terek Grozny – 2008
- Róbson Lopes – FC Chernomorets Novorossiysk – 2003
- Lucas Lovat – FC Akhmat Grozny – 2024
- Vágner Love – PFC CSKA Moscow – 2004–2011, 2013
- Ayrton Lucas – FC Spartak Moscow – 2019–2022
- Jorge Luís – FC Dynamo Moscow – 2006
- Luizão – FC Spartak Moscow – 2003
- Maicon – FC Lokomotiv Moscow – 2010–2017
- Malcom – FC Zenit Saint Petersburg – 2019–2023 (received Russian citizenship in 2023)
- **Gustavo Mantuan** – FC Zenit Saint Petersburg – 2022–2026
- Marcão – FC Spartak Moscow – 2000–2001
- Marcelo Silva – FC Spartak Moscow – 2002
- Marcinho – FC Ufa – 2014–2016
- Marcos – FC KamAZ-Chally Naberezhnye Chelny – 1997
- **Marquinhos** – FC Spartak Moscow – 2024–2026
- Maurício – FC Spartak Moscow – 2016–2017
- Maurício – FC Terek Grozny, FC Zenit St. Petersburg – 2010–2017
- Diego Maurício – FC Alania Vladikavkaz – 2012
- Miguel – PFC Sochi – 2023–2024
- Murilo – FC Lokomotiv Moscow – 2019–2021
- Mendes – FC Zhemchuzhina Sochi – 1998
- Milá – FC Uralan Elista – 2000
- Moisés – FC Spartak Moscow, FC Krylia Sovetov Samara – 2002–2004
- **Moisés** – PFC CSKA Moscow – 2022–2026
- Mozart – FC Spartak Moscow – 2005–2008
- Nadson – FC Krylia Sovetov Samara – 2013, 2015–2018
- Naldo – FC Krasnodar – 2016–2017
- Danilo Neco – FC Alania Vladikavkaz – 2012–2013
- **Nino** – FC Zenit St. Petersburg – 2024–2026
- **Ygor Nogueira** – FC Rostov – 2026
- Orinho – FC Khimki – 2024–2025
- Pablo – FC Rubin Kazan – 2020
- Pablo – FC Lokomotiv Moscow – 2021
- Pedrinho – FC Lokomotiv Moscow – 2022
- **Pedro** – FC Zenit St. Petersburg – 2024–2026
- Peniche – FC Spartak Moscow – 1999
- **Du Queiroz** – FC Zenit Saint Petersburg, FC Orenburg – 2023, 2025–2026
- Ramón – PFC CSKA Moscow, FC Krylia Sovetov Samara – 2007–2009
- Eduardo Ratinho – PFC CSKA Moscow – 2007
- Ravanelli – FC Akhmat Grozny – 2017–2020
- Régis – FC Saturn-RenTV Ramenskoye – 2003
- **Matheus Reis** – PFC CSKA Moscow – 2026
- Robert Renan – FC Zenit Saint Petersburg – 2023
- Ricardinho – FC Tosno – 2018
- **David Ricardo** – FC Dynamo Moscow – 2026
- Robert – FC Spartak Moscow – 2003
- Roberto Carlos – FC Anzhi Makhachkala – 2011
- Luis Robson – FC Spartak Moscow – 1997–2001
- Pedro Rocha – FC Spartak Moscow – 2017–2018
- Rodolfo – FC Lokomotiv Moscow, FC Terek Grozny – 2007–2010, 2015–2019
- Rodrigão – PFC Sochi, FC Zenit Saint Petersburg – 2021–2024
- **Júlio Romão** – FC Akhmat Grozny – 2026
- Rômulo – FC Spartak Moscow – 2012, 2014–2016
- **Ronaldo** – FC Rostov – 2024–2026
- Rôni – FC Rubin Kazan, FC Krylia Sovetov Samara – 2003–2005
- **Rubens** – FC Dynamo Moscow – 2025–2026
- Rudnei – FC Alania Vladikavkaz – 2012–2013
- Russo – FC Spartak Moscow – 2003
- Victor Sá – FC Krasnodar – 2024–2026
- Leandro Samarone – PFC CSKA Moscow, FC Torpedo-Luzhniki Moscow, FC Spartak Moscow, FC Krylia Sovetov Samara, FC Rubin Kazan – 1996–1998, 2000–2003
- Philipe Sampaio – FC Akhmat Grozny – 2017
- Felipe Santana – FC Kuban Krasnodar – 2016
- **Douglas Santos** – FC Zenit Saint Petersburg – 2019–2026 (received Russian citizenship in 2024)
- Lucas Santos – PFC CSKA Moscow – 2019
- Rafael Schmitz – FC Krylia Sovetov Samara – 2004
- **Igor Silva** – FC Rodina Moscow – 2026
- Souza – FC Krylia Sovetov Samara – 2003–2005
- Diego Tardelli – FC Anzhi Makhachkala – 2011
- Bruno Teles – FC Krylia Sovetov Samara – 2012–2014
- **Vítor Tormena** – FC Krasnodar – 2023–2026
- Thiago Maciel – FC Alania Vladikavkaz – 2005
- Rodrigo Tiuí – FC Terek Grozny – 2010–2011
- Vanderlei – FC Alania Vladikavkaz – 2003
- Bruno Viana – FC Khimki – 2022
- Victor – FC Amkar Perm – 2010
- **João Victor** – PFC CSKA Moscow – 2025–2026
- Vitinho – PFC CSKA Moscow – 2013–2014, 2017–2018
- Paulo Vitor – FC Akron Tolyatti – 2024, 2026
- Felipe Vizeu – FC Akhmat Grozny – 2020
- Jorge Wagner – FC Lokomotiv Moscow – 2003–2004
- Wágner – FC Lokomotiv Moscow – 2009–2010
- Wanderson – FC Krasnodar – 2017–2021
- Wánderson – FC Krasnodar, FC Dynamo Moscow – 2012–2017
- Welinton – FC Alania Vladikavkaz – 2013
- Welliton – FC Spartak Moscow – 2007–2012
- **Wendel** – FC Zenit Saint Petersburg – 2020–2026
- Willer – FC Anzhi Makhachkala, FC Luch-Energiya Vladivostok – 2002, 2006
- William – FC Amkar Perm, FC Ufa – 2009, 2014
- Willian – FC Anzhi Makhachkala – 2013
- Willian José – FC Spartak Moscow – 2024
- Willyan – PFC CSKA Moscow – 2022–2025
- Xandão – FC Kuban Krasnodar, FC Anzhi Makhachkala – 2013–2016
- Zelão – FC Saturn Ramenskoye, FC Kuban Krasnodar – 2008–2012

== Bulgaria ==
- Mihail Aleksandrov – FC Arsenal Tula – 2017–2018
- Atanas Bornosuzov – FC Tom Tomsk – 2005–2006
- Nikolay Dimitrov – FC Ural Yekaterinburg – 2017–2020
- Viktor Genev – FC Krylia Sovetov Samara – 2011
- Tsvetan Genkov – FC Dynamo Moscow – 2007–2009
- Blagoy Georgiev – FC Terek Grozny, FC Amkar Perm, FC Rubin Kazan, FC Orenburg – 2009–2017
- Ventsislav Hristov – FC SKA-Khabarovsk – 2017
- Valentin Iliev – FC Terek Grozny – 2008–2009
- Ivan Ivanov – FC Alania Vladikavkaz, FC Arsenal Tula – 2010, 2017
- Georgi Kostadinov – FC Arsenal Tula – 2018–2022
- Lachezar Kotev – FC Khimki – 2023
- Svetoslav Kovachev – FC Akhmat Grozny – 2023–2024
- Martin Kushev – FC Shinnik Yaroslavl, FC Amkar Perm – 2003–2010
- Zdravko Lazarov – FC Shinnik Yaroslavl – 2008
- Dimitar Makriev – FC Krylia Sovetov Samara – 2011
- Georgi Milanov – PFC CSKA Moscow – 2013–2018
- Zhivko Milanov – FC Tom Tomsk – 2013–2014
- Aleksandar Mladenov – FC Tom Tomsk – 2006–2008
- Stanislav Manolev – FC Kuban Krasnodar, FC Dynamo Moscow – 2014–2016
- Plamen Nikolov – FC Tom Tomsk – 2012–2013
- Georgi Peev – FC Amkar Perm – 2007–2016
- Ivaylo Petkov – FC Kuban Krasnodar – 2004, 2007
- Svetoslav Petrov – FC Kuban Krasnodar – 2004
- Ivelin Popov – FC Kuban Krasnodar, FC Spartak Moscow, FC Rubin Kazan, FC Rostov, PFC Sochi – 2012–2022
- Zahari Sirakov – FC Amkar Perm – 2004–2015
- Mateo Stamatov – FC Orenburg, FC Pari Nizhny Novgorod – 2022–2024
- Radostin Stanev – FC Shinnik Yaroslavl – 2003
- Ivan Stoyanov – FC Alania Vladikavkaz – 2010
- Dimitar Telkiyski – FC Amkar Perm – 2009
- Todor Timonov – FC Anzhi Makhachkala – 2010
- Dimitar Trendafilov – FC Fakel Voronezh – 1997
- **Emil Tsenov** – FC Orenburg – 2025–2026
- Chavdar Yankov – FC Rostov – 2010–2011
- Evgeni Yordanov – FC Amkar Perm – 2005–2006
- Petar Zanev – FC Amkar Perm, FC Yenisey Krasnoyarsk – 2013–2019

== Burkina Faso ==
- Ibrahim Gnanou – FC Alania Vladikavkaz – 2010
- Charles Kaboré – FC Kuban Krasnodar, FC Krasnodar, FC Dynamo Moscow – 2013–2021
- **Mohamed Konaté** – FC Ural Yekaterinburg, FC Tambov, FC Khimki, FC Akhmat Grozny – 2016, 2019–2026
- Bakary Koné – FC Arsenal Tula – 2019
- Hervé Zengue – FC Terek Grozny – 2010–2012

== Burundi ==
- Parfait Bizoza – FC Ufa – 2021

== Cameroon ==
- Benoît Angbwa – FC Krylia Sovetov Samara, FC Saturn Moscow Oblast, FC Anzhi Makhachkala, FC Rostov – 2006–2013
- Mvondo Atangana – FC Terek Grozny – 2005
- Samuel Didier Biang – FC Kuban Krasnodar – 2004
- André Bikey – FC Shinnik Yaroslavl, FC Lokomotiv Moscow – 2005–2006
- Jean Bouli – FC Terek Grozny – 2008–2009
- Petrus Boumal – FC Ural Yekaterinburg, FC Nizhny Novgorod – 2017–2021
- Serge Branco – FC Shinnik Yaroslavl, FC Krylia Sovetov Samara – 2005–2007
- Hans Eric Ekounga – FC Chernomorets Novorossiysk – 1998–1999
- David Embé – FC Chernomorets Novorossiysk – 2001
- Guy Stéphane Essame – FC Terek Grozny – 2008–2012
- Samuel Eto'o – FC Anzhi Makhachkala – 2011–2013
- Bruno Koagne Tokam – FC Chernomorets Novorossiysk – 1998–1999
- Didier Lamkel Zé – FC Khimki – 2022
- Clinton N'Jie – FC Dynamo Moscow – 2019–2022
- Moumi Ngamaleu – FC Dynamo Moscow – 2022–2026
- Jupiter Yves Ngangue – FC Anzhi Makhachkala – 2001
- Bertrand Ngapounou – FC Rostov – 2004
- **Gerzino Nyamsi** – FC Lokomotiv Moscow – 2024–2026
- Gaël Ondoua – FC Anzhi Makhachkala – 2018–2019
- Ambroise Oyongo – FC Krasnodar – 2021
- Michel Pensée – FC Anzhi Makhachkala – 2001
- Alex Song – FC Rubin Kazan – 2016–2017
- Alphonse Tchami – FC Chernomorets Novorossiysk – 2001
- Jerry-Christian Tchuissé – FC Chernomorets Novorossiysk, FC Spartak Moscow, FC Moscow – 1998–2006
- Adolphe Teikeu – FC Krasnodar, FC Terek Grozny – 2013, 2015
- **Christopher Wooh** – FC Spartak Moscow – 2025–2026
- Luc Zoa – FC Spartak Moscow – 2004

== Canada ==
- Amir Batyrev – PFC Sochi – 2022–2023
- Joseph Di Chiara – FC Krylia Sovetov Samara – 2011–2012
- Richie Ennin – FC Nizhny Novgorod – 2021–2022
- Ante Jazić – FC Kuban Krasnodar – 2004

== Cape Verde ==
- **Benchimol** – FC Akron Tolyatti – 2024–2026
- Zé Luís – FC Spartak Moscow, FC Lokomotiv Moscow – 2015–2021
- **Kevin Pina** – FC Krasnodar – 2022–2026
- Nuno Rocha – FC Tosno – 2017–2018

== Central African Republic ==
- Cédric Yambéré – FC Anzhi Makhachkala – 2016

== Chad ==
- Ezechiel N'Douassel – FC Terek Grozny – 2012–2013

== Chile ==
- Gerson Acevedo – FC Ural Yekaterinburg – 2013–2016
- Víctor Dávila – PFC CSKA Moscow – 2023–2024
- **Thomas Galdames** – PFC Krylia Sovetov Samara – 2024–2026
- Mark González – PFC CSKA Moscow – 2009–2013
- **Maximiliano Gutiérrez** – FC Dynamo Moscow – 2026
- Ángelo Henríquez – FC Baltika Kaliningrad – 2023–2024
- Eduardo Lobos – FC Krylia Sovetov Samara – 2005–2010
- Víctor Méndez – PFC CSKA Moscow, PFC Krylia Sovetov Samara – 2022–2024
- **Ignacio Saavedra** – PFC Sochi, FC Rubin Kazan – 2024–2026
- Guillermo Soto – FC Baltika Kaliningrad – 2023
- **Jordhy Thompson** – FC Orenburg – 2024–2026
- Marco Villaseca – FC Rostov – 2004

== Colombia ==
- **Andrés Alarcón** – FC Dynamo Makhachkala – 2025–2026
- **Kevin Andrade** – FC Baltika Kaliningrad, FC Zenit Saint Petersburg – 2024–2026
- **Anderson Arroyo** – FC Rubin Kazan – 2025–2026
- **Wilmar Barrios** – FC Zenit Saint Petersburg – 2019–2026
- Daniel Buitrago – PFC Spartak Nalchik – 2012
- Roger Cañas – FC Sibir Novosibirsk – 2010
- Jorge Carrascal – PFC CSKA Moscow, FC Dynamo Moscow – 2022–2025
- Mateo Cassierra – PFC Sochi, FC Zenit Saint Petersburg – 2021–2025
- Kevin Castaño – FC Krasnodar – 2024–2025
- Juan Castillo – FC Pari Nizhny Novgorod – 2025–2026
- **Jhon Córdoba** – FC Krasnodar – 2021–2026
- Jhon Durán – FC Zenit Saint Petersburg – 2026
- Juan Carlos Escobar – FC Krylia Sovetov Samara – 2007–2011
- **Jersson González** – FC Orenburg – 2026
- Ricardo Laborde – FC Krasnodar – 2013–2018
- **Robert Mejía** – FC Khimki, FC Orenburg – 2024–2026
- **Deiver Machado** – FC Rodina Moscow – 2026
- Dilan Ortiz – FC Ufa – 2022
- Darwin Quintero – FC Krylia Sovetov Samara – 2007
- **Jhon Palacios** – FC Orenburg – 2026
- Daniel Ruiz – PFC CSKA Moscow – 2025
- Jherson Vergara – FC Arsenal Tula – 2016–2017

== Republic of the Congo ==
- Emmerson – FC Ural Yekaterinburg – 2022–2024
- Delvin N'Dinga – FC Lokomotiv Moscow – 2015–2016
- Maurice Pedro – FC Anzhi Makhachkala – 2001
- Christopher Samba – FC Anzhi Makhachkala, FC Dynamo Moscow – 2012–2016
- Mavis Tchibota – FC Akron Tolyatti – 2024

== Democratic Republic of the Congo ==
- Jeremy Bokila – FC Terek Grozny – 2013–2015
- Théo Bongonda – FC Spartak Moscow – 2023–2026
- Giannelli Imbula – PFC Sochi – 2020
- Patrick Etshimi – PFC Spartak Nalchik – 2010
- Chris Mavinga – FC Rubin Kazan – 2013
- Mulumba Mukendi – FC Volga Nizhny Novgorod – 2013–2014
- Ilongo Ngasanya – PFC Spartak Nalchik – 2006
- **Maxime Sivis** – FC Orenburg – 2026
- Joël Tshibamba – FC Krylia Sovetov Samara – 2012

== Costa Rica ==
- Felicio Brown Forbes – FC Krylia Sovetov Samara, FC Ufa, FC Arsenal Tula, FC Anzhi Makhachkala, FC Amkar Perm – 2013–2014, 2016–2018
- Carlos Castro – FC Rubin Kazan – 2003
- **Jimmy Marín** – FC Orenburg, PFC Krylia Sovetov Samara – 2022–2026
- Winston Parks – FC Lokomotiv Moscow, FC Saturn Ramenskoye – 2003–2005
- **Manfred Ugalde** – FC Spartak Moscow – 2024–2026
- Marco Ureña – FC Kuban Krasnodar – 2011–2014
- Berny Wright – FC Krylia Sovetov Samara – 2003

== Croatia ==
- Mateo Barać – PFC Sochi, PFC Krylia Sovetov Samara – 2021–2023
- Tonči Bašić – FC Alania Vladikavkaz – 2001
- Silvije Begić – FC Orenburg, FC Rubin Kazan, PFC Krylia Sovetov Samara, FC Ural Yekaterinburg – 2018–2024
- **Kristijan Bistrović** – PFC CSKA Moscow, FC Baltika Kaliningrad, FC Akron Tolyatti – 2018–2021, 2023–2026
- Igor Budiša – FC Shinnik Yaroslavl – 2005–2006
- Mijo Caktaš – FC Rubin Kazan – 2016–2017
- Vedran Celiščak – FC Torpedo-Metallurg Moscow – 2003
- Josip Čondrić – FC Rotor Volgograd – 2020–2021
- Vedran Ćorluka – FC Lokomotiv Moscow – 2012–2021
- Mario Ćurić – FC Torpedo Moscow – 2022–2023
- Marko Dinjar – FC Terek Grozny – 2008
- Tomislav Dujmović – FC Amkar Perm, FC Lokomotiv Moscow, FC Dynamo Moscow, FC Mordovia Saransk – 2006–2013
- Matija Dvorneković – FC Volga Nizhny Novgorod – 2012–2013
- Marko Dugandžić – PFC Sochi – 2020–2021
- Danijel Hrman – FC Spartak Moscow – 2003
- Ivo Iličević – FC Anzhi Makhachkala – 2016
- Antonio Jakoliš – FC Fakel Voronezh – 2023
- Tin Jedvaj – FC Lokomotiv Moscow – 2021–2022
- Edin Junuzović – FC Amkar Perm – 2009
- Josip Knežević – FC Amkar Perm – 2010–2011
- Dario Krešić – FC Lokomotiv Moscow – 2012–2013
- Matija Kristić – FC Luch-Energiya Vladivostok – 2008
- Ivica Križanac – FC Zenit St. Petersburg – 2005–2010
- Marko Livaja – FC Rubin Kazan – 2014–2015
- Dejan Lovren – FC Zenit St. Petersburg – 2020–2022
- Hrvoje Milić – FC Rostov – 2013–2015
- Danijel Miškić – FC Orenburg, FC Ural Yekaterinburg – 2018–2024
- Nikola Moro – FC Dynamo Moscow – 2020–2022
- Filip Mrzljak – FC Ufa – 2020–2022
- Zoran Nižić – FC Akhmat Grozny – 2019–2023
- Igor Novaković – FC Tom Tomsk – 2006–2007
- Ivica Olić – PFC CSKA Moscow – 2003–2006
- **Dominik Oroz** – PFC Krylia Sovetov Samara – 2024–2026
- Mario Pašalić – FC Spartak Moscow – 2017–2018
- Ivan Paurević – FC Ufa – 2014–2019
- Boris Pavić – FC Chernomorets Novorossiysk – 2001
- Ante Pešić – PFC CSKA Moscow – 1999
- Stipe Pletikosa – FC Spartak Moscow, FC Rostov – 2007–2009, 2011–2015
- Ante Puljić – FC Tom Tomsk – 2016–2017
- Dejan Radonjić – FC Krylia Sovetov Samara – 2019–2020
- Zvonimir Šarlija – PFC CSKA Moscow – 2019
- Gordon Schildenfeld – FC Dynamo Moscow – 2012
- Marko Šimić – FC Khimki – 2007, 2009
- Stjepan Skočibušić – FC Torpedo Moscow – 2006
- Stjepan Tomas – FC Rubin Kazan – 2007–2009
- Filip Uremović – FC Rubin Kazan – 2018–2022
- Hrvoje Vejić – FC Tom Tomsk – 2005–2008
- Nikola Vlašić – PFC CSKA Moscow – 2018–2021
- Marijan Vuka – FC Kuban Krasnodar – 2004
- Ognjen Vukojević – FC Spartak Moscow – 2013
- Danijel Vušković – FC Luch-Energiya Vladivostok – 2008
- Ivica Žunić – FC Orenburg – 2016

== Czech Republic ==
- Erich Brabec – FC Dynamo Moscow, FC Alania Vladikavkaz – 2002–2004
- Marek Čech – FC Luch-Energiya Vladivostok, FC Lokomotiv Moscow – 2007–2009
- Tomáš Čížek – FC Rubin Kazan, FC Moscow, FC Sibir Novosibirsk – 2003–2008, 2010
- Richard Dostálek – FC Rubin Kazan – 2004
- Lukáš Droppa – FC Tom Tomsk – 2016
- Jan Flachbart – FC Zenit St. Petersburg – 2004–2005
- Lukáš Hartig – FC Zenit St. Petersburg – 2003–2005
- Martin Hašek – FC Dynamo Moscow – 2004
- Jan Holenda – FC Anzhi Makhachkala, FC Rostov, FC Tom Tomsk – 2010–2014
- Martin Horák – FC Zenit St. Petersburg, FC Rostov, FC Shinnik Yaroslavl, FC Sibir Novosibirsk – 2003–2007, 2010
- Roman Hubník – FC Moscow – 2007–2008
- Martin Hyský – FC Dynamo Moscow – 2002
- David Jablonský – FC Tom Tomsk – 2016
- Jiří Jarošík – PFC CSKA Moscow, FC Krylia Sovetov Samara – 2003–2004, 2008–2009
- Martin Jiránek – FC Spartak Moscow, FC Terek Grozny, FC Tom Tomsk – 2004–2014
- Luboš Kalouda – PFC CSKA Moscow – 2008
- Marek Kincl – FC Zenit St. Petersburg – 2004
- Antonín Kinský – FC Saturn Ramenskoye – 2004–2010
- Jan Koller – FC Krylia Sovetov Samara – 2008–2009
- Radoslav Kováč – FC Spartak Moscow – 2005–2008
- Alex Král – FC Spartak Moscow – 2019–2021
- Tomáš Kuchař – FC Shinnik Yaroslavl – 2003
- Jan Kuchta – FC Lokomotiv Moscow – 2022
- Roman Lengyel – FC Saturn Ramenskoye, FC Kuban Krasnodar, FC Rostov – 2004, 2007, 2009–2010
- Pavel Mareš – FC Zenit St. Petersburg – 2003–2006
- Jurij Medveděv – PFC Sochi – 2023–2024
- Tomáš Necid – PFC CSKA Moscow – 2009–2013
- Jaroslav Nesvadba – FC Zenit St. Petersburg – 2006
- Jiří Novotný – FC Rubin Kazan – 2003–2004
- Marian Palát – FC Luch-Energiya Vladivostok – 2007
- Michal Papadopulos – FC Rostov – 2011–2012
- Adam Petrouš – FC Rubin Kazan – 2004
- Radek Šírl – FC Zenit St. Petersburg – 2003–2009
- Marek Suchý – FC Spartak Moscow – 2010–2013
- Aleš Urbánek – FC Spartak Moscow – 2004
- Karel Urbánek – FC Lokomotiv Nizhny Novgorod – 1999
- Ondřej Vaněk – FC Ufa – 2016–2019
- Petr Vašek – FC Sibir Novosibirsk, FC Tom Tomsk – 2010, 2012–2014
- Stanislav Vlček – FC Dynamo Moscow – 2004
- Tomáš Vychodil – FC Tom Tomsk, FC Sibir Novosibirsk – 2005, 2010
- Martin Zbončák – FC Dynamo Moscow – 2004

== Denmark ==
- Oliver Abildgaard – FC Rubin Kazan – 2020–2022
- Anders Dreyer – FC Rubin Kazan – 2021
- Michael Lumb – FC Zenit St. Petersburg – 2010–2012
- Younes Namli – FC Krasnodar – 2019

== Ecuador ==
- Alejandro Cabeza – PFC Sochi – 2023
- Felipe Caicedo – FC Lokomotiv Moscow – 2011–2013
- Justin Cuero – FC Orenburg – 2023–2025
- Christian Noboa – FC Rubin Kazan, FC Dynamo Moscow, FC Rostov, FC Zenit St. Petersburg, PFC Sochi – 2007–2023
- **Cristian Ramírez** – FC Krasnodar, FC Lokomotiv Moscow – 2017–2023, 2025–2026 (acquired Russian citizenship in 2021, is not eligible to play for Russia national team)

== Egypt ==
- Eyad El Askalany – FC Rostov – 2024

== El Salvador ==
- **Brayan Gil** – FC Baltika Kaliningrad – 2025–2026
- Rodolfo Zelaya – FC Alania Vladikavkaz – 2013

== England ==
- Tino Anjorin – FC Lokomotiv Moscow – 2021
- David Bentley – FC Rostov – 2012

== Estonia ==
- Enar Jääger – FC Torpedo Moscow – 2005–2006
- Tarmo Kink – FC Spartak Moscow – 2003
- Andrei Krasnopjorov – PFC CSKA Moscow – 1999
- Dmitri Kruglov – FC Lokomotiv Moscow, FC Rostov – 2005–2006, 2011–2012
- Oleg Lepik – FC Chernomorets Novorossiysk – 1997–1999
- Jevgeni Novikov – FC Tom Tomsk – 2005
- Andres Oper – FC Torpedo Moscow – 2003–2005
- Sergei Pareiko – FC Rotor Volgograd, FC Tom Tomsk, FC Volga Nizhny Novgorod – 2001–2010, 2013–2014
- Andrei Stepanov – FC Torpedo Moscow, FC Khimki – 2004–2008
- Sergei Terehhov – FC Shinnik Yaroslavl – 2005
- Konstantin Vassiljev – FC Amkar Perm – 2011–2014
- Sergei Zenjov – FC Torpedo Moscow – 2015

== Finland ==
- Alexei Eremenko – FC Saturn Ramenskoye, FC Rubin Kazan – 2006–2009, 2011–2013
- Roman Eremenko – FC Rubin Kazan, PFC CSKA Moscow, FC Spartak Moscow, FC Rostov – 2011–2016, 2018–2020
- Otto Fredrikson – PFC Spartak Nalchik – 2010–2012
- Juhani Ojala – FC Terek Grozny – 2013–2014
- Boris Rotenberg – FC Shinnik Yaroslavl, FC Khimki, FC Alania Vladikavkaz, FC Dynamo Moscow, FC Rostov, FC Lokomotiv Moscow – 2008–2010, 2013–2018
- Berat Sadik – FC Krylia Sovetov Samara – 2015–2017
- Jani Tapani Virtanen – FC Khimki – 2009

== France ==
- Nabil Aberdin – PFC Sochi – 2025
- Filipe Azevedo – FC Lokomotiv Moscow – 2000
- Alexis Beka Beka – FC Lokomotiv Moscow – 2021–2022
- Mohamed Brahimi – FC Fakel Voronezh – 2023–2025
- Rémy Cabella – FC Krasnodar – 2019–2021
- Djibril Cissé – FC Kuban Krasnodar – 2013
- Lassana Diarra – FC Anzhi Makhachkala, FC Lokomotiv Moscow – 2012–2014
- Johann Duveau – FC Torpedo Moscow – 2000
- Mounir El Haimour – FC Alania Vladikavkaz – 2004
- Samuel Gigot – FC Spartak Moscow – 2018–2022
- **Axel Gnapi** – FC Fakel Voronezh – 2026
- Steeve Joseph-Reinette – FC Sibir Novosibirsk, FC Krylia Sovetov Samara – 2010–2013
- Damien Le Tallec – FC Mordovia Saransk, FC Torpedo Moscow – 2014–2015, 2022 (acquired Russian citizenship in 2020)
- Yohan Mollo – FC Krylia Sovetov Samara, FC Zenit St. Petersburg – 2015–2018
- **Loris Mouyokolo** – FC Baltika Kaliningrad – 2026
- Yann M'Vila – FC Rubin Kazan – 2013–2014, 2016–2017
- **Mickaël Nadé** – FC Rodina Moscow – 2026
- Gabriel Obertan – FC Anzhi Makhachkala – 2016
- Gaëtan Perrin – FC Krasnodar – 2025
- Thomas Phibel – FC Amkar Perm, FC Mordovia Saransk, FC Anzhi Makhachkala – 2013–2017
- Sébastien Puygrenier – FC Zenit St. Petersburg – 2008
- Réda Rabeï – FC Fakel Voronezh – 2023
- Sébastien Sansoni – FC Khimki – 2009
- Rayan Senhadji – FC Fakel Voronezh – 2024–2025
- **Jacques Siwe** – FC Rubin Kazan – 2025–2026
- Florent Sinama Pongolle – FC Rostov – 2012–2014
- William Vainqueur – FC Dynamo Moscow – 2014–2015
- Mathieu Valbuena – FC Dynamo Moscow – 2014–2015

== Gabon ==
- Guélor Kanga – FC Rostov – 2013–2016

== Gambia ==
- Ebrima Ebou Sillah – FC Rubin Kazan – 2003–2005
- Ali Sowe – FC Rostov – 2021–2022

== Georgia ==
- Valeri Abramidze – FC Spartak Moscow, FC Uralan Elista – 2002–2003
- Rati Aleksidze – FC Rostov – 2004
- Besik Amashukeli – FC Lada Togliatti – 1996
- Aleksandre Amisulashvili – FC Shinnik Yaroslavl, PFC Spartak Nalchik, FC Krasnodar, FC Krylia Sovetov Samara – 2006–2014
- Jano Ananidze – FC Spartak Moscow, FC Rostov, FC Krylia Sovetov Samara – 2009–2019
- Giorgi Arabidze – FC Rotor Volgograd – 2021
- Zurab Arziani – FC Anzhi Makhachkala, FC Volga Nizhny Novgorod – 2010–2011
- Malkhaz Asatiani – FC Lokomotiv Moscow – 2003–2010
- Mikheil Ashvetia – FC Alania Vladikavkaz, FC Lokomotiv Moscow, FC Rostov, FC Rubin Kazan – 1997, 2000, 2002–2006
- Revaz Barabadze – FC Anzhi Makhachkala – 2010
- Vakho Bedoshvili – FC Pari Nizhny Novgorod – 2025
- Besik Beradze – FC Chernomorets Novorossiysk – 1996–1998
- Paata Berishvili – FC Dynamo Stavropol – 1992
- Gennadi Bondaruk – FC Zhemchuzhina Sochi – 1993–1999
- Vladimir Burduli – FC Alania Vladikavkaz – 2005
- David Chaladze – FC Alania Vladikavkaz, FC Rubin Kazan – 1998, 2003
- Giorgi Chanturia – FC Alania Vladikavkaz, FC Ural Yekaterinburg – 2013, 2016–2018
- Soso Chedia – FC KamAZ-Chally Naberezhnye Chelny – 1996
- Giorgi Chelidze – FC Lokomotiv Moscow – 2005–2006
- Anri Chichinadze – FC Orenburg – 2025
- Davit Chichveishvili – FC Alania Vladikavkaz – 1999
- Gia Chkhaidze – FC Alania Vladikavkaz – 1999
- Vitali Daraselia Jr. – FC Alania Vladikavkaz – 2004–2005
- Zuriko Davitashvili – FC Rubin Kazan, FC Rotor Volgograd, FC Arsenal Tula – 2019–2022
- Giorgi Davitnidze – FC Uralan Elista – 2000
- Giorgi Demetradze – FC Alania Vladikavkaz, FC Lokomotiv Moscow – 1998–1999, 2002, 2005
- Akaki Devadze – FC Rostselmash Rostov-on-Don – 1995–1996
- Giorgi Dzneladze – FC Krylia Sovetov Samara – 1992–1993
- Iuri Gabiskiria – FC KamAZ-Chally Naberezhnye Chelny – 1996
- Luka Gagnidze – FC Ural Yekaterinburg, FC Dynamo Moscow, PFC Krylia Sovetov Samara – 2021–2025
- Giorgi Gakhokidze – FC Alania Vladikavkaz – 1997–1998
- Rezo Gavtadze – FC Ural Yekaterinburg – 2016
- Aleksandre Geladze – FC Zhemchuzhina Sochi – 1998
- Irakli Geperidze – PFC Spartak Nalchik – 2006
- Zurab Gigashvili – FC Tambov – 2020–2021
- Vasil Gigiadze – FC Uralan Elista – 2003
- Giorgi Gogiashvili – FC Zhemchuzhina Sochi – 1996–1999
- Aleksandre Gogoberishvili – FC Anzhi Makhachkala – 2000
- Gocha Gogrichiani – FC Zhemchuzhina Sochi, FC Lokomotiv Nizhny Novgorod – 1993, 1996–1999
- Gogita Gogua – PFC Spartak Nalchik, FC Saturn Ramenskoye, FC Terek Grozny, FC Volga Nizhny Novgorod – 2006–2011
- Shota Grigalashvili – FC Alania Vladikavkaz – 2012
- Gia Grigalava – FC Rostov, FC Moscow, FC Volga Nizhny Novgorod, FC Krylia Sovetov Samara, FC Anzhi Makhachkala, FC Arsenal Tula, FC Khimki – 2007, 2009–2014, 2017–2022
- Soso Grishikashvili – FC Spartak-Alania Vladikavkaz – 1995
- Giorgi Gudushauri – FC Torpedo Moscow – 1998
- Gocha Gujabidze – FC Rostselmash Rostov-on-Don – 1995
- Davit Gvaramadze – FC Krylia Sovetov Samara – 1999–2000
- Levan Gvazava – FC Alania Vladikavkaz, PFC Spartak Nalchik, FC Luch-Energiya Vladivostok, FC Terek Grozny – 2004–2011
- Giorgi Iluridze – FC Anzhi Makhachkala – 2010
- Grigol Imedadze – FC Alania Vladikavkaz – 2002
- Gela Inalishvili – FC Krylia Sovetov Samara – 1997
- Zurab Ionanidze – FC Zhemchuzhina Sochi, FC Lokomotiv Nizhny Novgorod – 1996–1997
- Gocha Jamarauli – FC Alania Vladikavkaz – 1996
- Davit Janashia – FC Zhemchuzhina Sochi, FC Chernomorets Novorossiysk – 1996–1997
- Zaza Janashia – FC Lokomotiv Moscow – 1996–2001
- Gizo Jeladze – FC Zhemchuzhina Sochi – 1999
- Mikheil Jishkariani – FC KamAZ-Chally Naberezhnye Chelny – 1995–1997
- Jaba Kankava – FC Alania Vladikavkaz – 2005
- Mikheil Kavelashvili – FC Alania Vladikavkaz – 1995, 2004
- Otar Khizaneishvili – FC Spartak Moscow, FC Rostselmash Rostov-on-Don, FC Dynamo Moscow, FC Anzhi Makhachkala – 2000–2001, 2004, 2010
- David Khmelidze – FC Rostselmash Rostov-on-Don – 2001
- Gocha Khojava – FC Rostov, FC Anzhi Makhachkala, FC Volga Nizhny Novgorod – 2005, 2010–2011
- Akaki Khubutia – FC Mordovia Saransk – 2013
- Georgi Kinkladze – FC Rubin Kazan – 2005–2006
- Mamuka Kobakhidze – FC Rubin Kazan, FC Mordovia Saransk – 2014–2016
- Levan Kobiashvili – FC Alania Vladikavkaz – 1997
- Dimitri Kudinov – FC Zhemchuzhina Sochi – 1997
- Nikoloz Kutateladze – FC Pari Nizhny Novgorod – 2023–2024
- Khvicha Kvaratskhelia – FC Lokomotiv Moscow, FC Rubin Kazan – 2019–2022
- Irakli Kvekveskiri – FC Fakel Voronezh, FC Orenburg – 2022–2026
- Davit Kvirkvelia – FC Alania Vladikavkaz, FC Rubin Kazan, FC Anzhi Makhachkala – 2005, 2008–2010
- Solomon Kvirkvelia – FC Rubin Kazan, FC Lokomotiv Moscow, FC Rotor Volgograd – 2011–2021
- Giorgi Ladaria – FC Chernomorets Novorossiysk – 1996
- Jaba Lipartia – FC Anzhi Makhachkala – 2017
- Elguja Lobjanidze – FC Orenburg – 2017
- Nugzar Lobzhanidze – PFC CSKA Moscow – 1997
- Giorgi Lomaia – FC Spartak Moscow, FC Luch-Energiya Vladivostok – 2004, 2006
- Giorgi Loria – FC Krylia Sovetov Samara, FC Anzhi Makhachkala – 2015–2018
- Otar Martsvaladze – FC Volga Nizhny Novgorod, FC Krasnodar – 2011–2012
- Zurab Menteshashvili – FC Spartak-Alania Vladikavkaz, FC Shinnik Yaroslavl – 2003, 2006
- Beka Mikeltadze – FC Rubin Kazan, FC Rotor Volgograd – 2019–2020
- Mamuka Minashvili – FC Krylia Sovetov Samara – 1994–1998
- Lasha Monaselidze – FC Torpedo Moscow – 1998
- Davit Mujiri – FC Krylia Sovetov Samara, FC Lokomotiv Moscow – 2006–2009
- Kakhaber Mzhavanadze – FC Spartak Moscow, FC Anzhi Makhachkala – 2001–2002
- Giorgi Navalovski – FC SKA-Khabarovsk – 2017–2018
- Tornike Okriashvili – FC Krasnodar – 2016–2018
- Zurab Popkhadze – FC Krylia Sovetov Samara, FC Lokomotiv Nizhny Novgorod, FC Alania Vladikavkaz – 1997–2001
- Mikheil Potskhveria – FC Alania Vladikavkaz – 2000
- Aleksandre Rekhviashvili – FC Torpedo-Metallurg Moscow – 2003
- Giorgi Revazishvili – FC Krylia Sovetov Samara – 1998
- Nukri Revishvili – FC Rubin Kazan, FC Anzhi Makhachkala, FC Krasnodar, FC Mordovia Saransk – 2006–2007, 2009–2012, 2015–2016
- Zaza Revishvili – FC Alania Vladikavkaz – 1995–1996
- Guja Rukhaia – PFC Spartak Nalchik – 2011–2012
- Edik Sajaia – FC Torpedo Moscow – 2001–2002
- Lasha Salukvadze – FC Rubin Kazan, FC Volga Nizhny Novgorod – 2005–2011
- Saba Sazonov – FC Zenit Saint Petersburg, FC Dynamo Moscow – 2021–2023
- Vaso Sepashvili – FC Lada Togliatti – 1996
- Giorgi Shashiashvili – FC Alania Vladikavkaz – 2005
- Murtaz Shelia – FC Alania Vladikavkaz – 1995–1997
- Levan Silagadze – FC Alania Vladikavkaz, FC Rubin Kazan – 2000, 2003
- David Siradze – PFC Spartak Nalchik – 2008–2012
- Jemal Tabidze – FC Ural Yekaterinburg, FC Ufa, FC Dynamo Makhachkala – 2017–2021, 2024–2026
- Said Tarba – FC Zhemchuzhina Sochi – 1995
- Sevasti Todua – FC Uralan Elista – 2002
- Mamuka Tsereteli – FC Alania Vladikavkaz – 1998–2000
- Zurab Tsiskaridze – FC Amkar Perm – 2011
- Kakhaber Tskhadadze – FC Spartak Moscow, FC Dynamo Moscow, FC Alania Vladikavkaz – 1992, 1997
- Luka Tsulukidze – FC Ural Yekaterinburg – 2023
- Mate Vatsadze – FC Volga Nizhny Novgorod – 2011

== Germany ==
- Robert Bauer – FC Arsenal Tula – 2019–2021
- Patrick Ebert – FC Spartak Moscow – 2014–2015
- Malik Fathi – FC Spartak Moscow – 2008–2009
- Benedikt Höwedes – FC Lokomotiv Moscow – 2018–2020
- Kevin Kurányi – FC Dynamo Moscow – 2010–2015
- Maximilian Philipp – FC Dynamo Moscow – 2019–2020
- Marvin Pourié – FC Ufa – 2015–2016
- André Schürrle – FC Spartak Moscow – 2019
- Serdar Tasci – FC Spartak Moscow – 2014–2018

== Ghana ==
- Baba Adamu – FC Chernomorets Novorossiysk, FC Rostselmash Rostov-on-Don, FC Lokomotiv Moscow, FC Moscow, FC Krylia Sovetov Samara – 2001–2002, 2004–2006
- Lawrence Adjei – FC Spartak Moscow – 2001
- Prince Koranteng Amoako – FC Saturn Ramenskoye – 2001–2004
- **Alexander Djiku** – FC Spartak Moscow – 2025–2026
- Haminu Draman – FC Lokomotiv Moscow, FC Kuban Krasnodar – 2007–2010
- Joel Fameyeh – FC Orenburg, FC Rubin Kazan, FC Baltika Kaliningrad – 2019–2020, 2023–2024
- Emmanuel Frimpong – FC Ufa, FC Arsenal Tula – 2014–2016
- Baffour Gyan – FC Dynamo Moscow, FC Saturn Ramenskoye – 2004–2008
- Mohammed Kadiri – FC Arsenal Tula – 2018–2020
- Laryea Kingston – FC Krylia Sovetov Samara, FC Terek Grozny, FC Lokomotiv Moscow – 2004–2006
- Emmanuel Osei Kuffour – FC Anzhi Makhachkala – 2002
- Jonathan Mensah – FC Anzhi Makhachkala – 2016
- Alex Opoku Sarfo – FC Pari Nizhny Novgorod – 2025–2026
- Kwadkwo Poku – FC Anzhi Makhachkala – 2018
- Quincy – FC Spartak Moscow – 2006–2007, 2009
- Mohammed Rabiu – FC Kuban Krasnodar, FC Anzhi Makhachkala, FC Krylia Sovetov Samara, FC Tambov – 2013–2016, 2018–2020
- Illiasu Shilla – FC Saturn Ramenskoye – 2006–2007
- Abdul Aziz Tetteh – FC Dynamo Moscow – 2018–2019
- Patrick Twumasi – FC Amkar Perm – 2014
- Mubarak Wakaso – FC Rubin Kazan – 2013–2014
- Abdul Majeed Waris – FC Spartak Moscow – 2013–2014

== Greece ==
- Nikos Karelis – FC Amkar Perm – 2012–2013
- Giourkas Seitaridis – FC Dynamo Moscow – 2005

== Guinea ==
- Ibrahima Cissé – FC Ural Yekaterinburg – 2022–2024
- Sékou Condé – FC Amkar Perm – 2016–2018
- François Kamano – FC Lokomotiv Moscow, PFC Sochi – 2020–2023, 2025–2026
- **Kerfala Cissoko** – FC Rodina Moscow – 2026
- Momo Yansané – FC Pari Nizhny Novgorod – 2022–2023

== Guinea-Bissau ==
- Janio Bikel – FC Khimki – 2023
- Cícero – FC Dynamo Moscow – 2005–2007
- Almami Moreira – FC Dynamo Moscow – 2006
- Zé Turbo – FC Pari Nizhny Novgorod – 2023–2024

== Haiti ==
- **Josué Casimir** – FC Dynamo Moscow – 2026
- Réginal Goreux – FC Krylia Sovetov Samara, FC Rostov – 2013–2014
- Wilson Isidor – FC Lokomotiv Moscow, FC Zenit St. Petersburg – 2022–2024

== Honduras ==
- **Denil Maldonado** – FC Rubin Kazan – 2026

== Hungary ==
- Balázs Dzsudzsák – FC Anzhi Makhachkala, FC Dynamo Moscow – 2011–2015
- Miklós Gaál – FC Amkar Perm, FC Volga Nizhny Novgorod – 2007–2011
- Szabolcs Huszti – FC Zenit St. Petersburg – 2009–2012
- Ákos Kecskés – FC Pari Nizhny Novgorod – 2021–2022
- Vladimir Koman – FC Krasnodar, FC Ural Yekaterinburg – 2012–2014
- Márk Koszta – FC Torpedo Moscow – 2022
- Norbert Németh – FC Tom Tomsk – 2009–2010
- Ádám Pintér – FC Tom Tomsk – 2013–2014
- Tamás Priskin – FC Alania Vladikavkaz – 2012–2013
- Szabolcs Sáfár – FC Spartak Moscow – 2003

== Iceland ==
- Jón Guðni Fjóluson – FC Krasnodar – 2018–2020
- Sverrir Ingi Ingason – FC Rostov – 2017–2018
- Viðar Örn Kjartansson – FC Rostov, FC Rubin Kazan – 2018–2019
- Hörður Björgvin Magnússon – PFC CSKA Moscow – 2018–2022
- Sölvi Ottesen – FC Ural Yekaterinburg – 2013–2014
- Björn Bergmann Sigurðarson – FC Rostov – 2018–2019
- Arnór Sigurðsson – PFC CSKA Moscow – 2018–2021
- Hannes Sigurðsson – PFC Spartak Nalchik – 2011
- Ragnar Sigurðsson – FC Krasnodar, FC Rubin Kazan, FC Rostov – 2014–2019
- Arnór Smárason – FC Torpedo Moscow – 2015

== Iran ==
- Sardar Azmoun – FC Rubin Kazan, FC Rostov, FC Zenit Saint Petersburg – 2013–2021
- Saeid Ezatolahi – FC Rostov, FC Anzhi Makhachkala, FC Amkar Perm – 2016–2018
- Mohammad Ghorbani – FC Orenburg – 2024
- **Mohammad Javad Hosseinnejad** – FC Dynamo Makhachkala – 2024–2026
- Milad Mohammadi – FC Akhmat Grozny – 2016–2019
- Mohammad Mohebi – FC Rostov – 2023–2026
- Amirhossein Reyvandi – PFC CSKA Moscow – 2024
- Saeid Saharkhizan – FC Orenburg – 2024–2025
- Reza Shekari – FC Rubin Kazan – 2018
- Kasra Taheri – FC Rubin Kazan – 2024–2025
- Mohammadmehdi Zare – FC Akhmat Grozny – 2025–2026

== Iraq ==
- Safaa Hadi – PFC Krylia Sovetov Samara – 2020

== Ireland ==
- Aiden McGeady – FC Spartak Moscow – 2010–2013

== Israel ==
- Dani Bondar – FC Volga Nizhny Novgorod – 2011–2012
- Eli Dasa – FC Dynamo Moscow – 2022–2025
- Dan Glazer – FC Pari Nizhny Novgorod – 2024
- Edi Gotlieb – FC Orenburg – 2019–2020
- Ze'ev Haimovich – FC Terek Grozny – 2009–2011
- Bibars Natcho – FC Rubin Kazan, PFC CSKA Moscow – 2010–2018
- Toto Tamuz – FC Ural Yekaterinburg – 2013

== Italy ==
- Salvatore Bocchetti – FC Rubin Kazan, FC Spartak Moscow – 2010–2019
- Domenico Criscito – FC Zenit St. Petersburg – 2011–2018
- Alessandro Dal Canto – FC Uralan Elista – 2003
- Claudio Marchisio – FC Zenit Saint Petersburg – 2018
- Cristian Pasquato – FC Krylia Sovetov Samara – 2016–2017
- Dario Passoni – FC Uralan Elista – 2003
- Ivan Pelizzoli – FC Lokomotiv Moscow – 2007–2008
- Alessandro Rosina – FC Zenit St. Petersburg – 2009–2012
- Francesco Ruopolo – FC Lokomotiv Moscow – 2005
- **Eddie Salcedo** – FC Rubin Kazan – 2026

== Ivory Coast ==
- Boni Amian – FC Khimki – 2025
- Victorien Angban – PFC Sochi, FC Dynamo Makhachkala – 2021–2024
- Yacouba Bamba – FC Orenburg – 2016
- Yannick Boli – FC Anzhi Makhachkala – 2015–2016
- Jean-Jacques Bougouhi – FC Ural Yekaterinburg – 2016–2017
- Idrissa Doumbia – FC Akhmat Grozny – 2018
- Seydou Doumbia – PFC CSKA Moscow – 2010–2015
- Néné Gbamblé – FC Akhmat Grozny – 2023
- Jean-Philippe Gbamin – PFC CSKA Moscow – 2022
- Roman Mory Gbane – FC Khimki – 2022–2023
- Cédric Gogoua – FC Tambov, PFC CSKA Moscow, FC Rotor Volgograd, FC Khimki – 2019–2021, 2024
- Dacosta Goore – FC Luch-Energiya Vladivostok, FC Moscow, FC Alania Vladikavkaz – 2008–2010, 2012–2013
- Eboue Kouassi – FC Krasnodar – 2016
- Igor Lolo – FC Kuban Krasnodar, FC Rostov – 2011–2015
- Habib Maïga – FC Arsenal Tula – 2018
- Marco Né – FC Kuban Krasnodar – 2011
- Abdul Razak – FC Anzhi Makhachkala – 2013
- Senin Sebai – FC Khimki, FC Akhmat Grozny – 2021–2022
- Lacina Traoré – FC Kuban Krasnodar, FC Anzhi Makhachkala, PFC CSKA Moscow – 2011–2013, 2016

== Jamaica ==
- Renaldo Cephas – FC Pari Nizhny Novgorod – 2025–2026
- Shamar Nicholson – FC Spartak Moscow – 2022–2024
- Damani Ralph – FC Rubin Kazan – 2005, 2007
- Robert Scarlett – FC Spartak Moscow – 2002
- Luton Shelton – FC Volga Nizhny Novgorod – 2013–2014
- Errol Stevens – FC Khimki – 2009

== Japan ==
- Takafumi Akahoshi – FC Ufa – 2014
- Kento Hashimoto – FC Rostov – 2020–2022
- Keisuke Honda – PFC CSKA Moscow – 2010–2013
- Seiichiro Maki – FC Amkar Perm – 2010
- Daisuke Matsui – FC Tom Tomsk – 2010
- Takuma Nishimura – PFC CSKA Moscow – 2018–2019
- Mitsuki Saito – FC Rubin Kazan – 2021

== Jordan ==
- Badran Al-Shaqran – FC KamAZ-Chally Naberezhnye Chelny – 1995–1997
- Adnan Al-Shuaibat – FC KamAZ-Chally Naberezhnye Chelny – 1995–1996

== Kazakhstan ==
- Vitaliy Abramov – FC Tekstilshchik Kamyshin, FC Rotor Volgograd – 1995–1999
- Yuri Aksenov – FC Uralan Elista – 1998–1999, 2002
- **Nuraly Alip** – FC Zenit St. Petersburg – 2022–2026
- Igor Avdeyev – FC Alania Vladikavkaz – 1997
- Akmal Bakhtiyarov – PFC Sochi – 2019–2020
- Ruslan Baltiyev – FC Sokol Saratov, FC Dynamo Moscow, FC Moscow, FC Shinnik Yaroslavl – 2001–2005
- Aleksandr Bogatyryov – FC Tekstilshchik Kamyshin – 1992
- Marat Bystrov – FC Akhmat Grozny – 2020–2023
- Sergei Chekmezov – FC Zhemchuzhina Sochi, PFC Krylia Sovetov Samara – 1993–1994
- **Islam Chesnokov** – PFC Krylia Sovetov Samara – 2026
- Oleg Chukhleba – FC Lada Togliatti, FC Lokomotiv Nizhny Novgorod – 1994, 1996
- Viktor Dmitrenko – FC Kuban Krasnodar – 2009
- Renat Dubinskiy – FC Shinnik Yaroslavl – 2002–2005
- Vadim Egoshkin – FC Chernomorets Novorossiysk – 1996
- Aleksandr Familtsev – FC Torpedo Moscow, FC Tom Tomsk – 2001, 2005
- Kazbek Geteriev – PFC Spartak Nalchik, FC Alania Vladikavkaz – 2007–2010, 2012
- Aleksandr Goncharenko – FC Luch Vladivostok – 1993
- Igor Grokhovskiy – FC Lokomotiv Nizhny Novgorod – 1994
- Yuri Ivanov – FC Lada Togliatti – 1994
- Askhat Kadyrkulov – PFC CSKA Moscow – 2000–2001
- Oleg Kapustnikov – FC KamAZ-Chally Naberezhnye Chelny – 1995
- Andrey Karpovich – FC Rostov, FC Dynamo Moscow – 2002–2003, 2007–2008
- **Galymzhan Kenzhebek** – FC Akhmat Grozny – 2026
- Oleg Kornienko – FC Alania Vladikavkaz – 1994–1999
- Islambek Kuat – FC Orenburg, FC Khimki – 2020
- Andrei Kurdyumov – FC Zenit St. Petersburg, FC Chernomorets Novorossiysk – 1997–1999
- Konstantin Ledovskikh – FC Uralmash Yekaterinburg, FC Zhemchuzhina Sochi – 1993–1994, 1999
- David Loriya – PFC Spartak Nalchik – 2009
- Yevgeny Lovchev – FC Lokomotiv Moscow – 1996
- Dmitry Lyapkin – FC Energiya-Tekstilshchik Kamyshin, FC Saturn Ramenskoye, FC Khimki – 1996, 1999–2002, 2007
- Andrei Miroshnichenko – FC Rotor Volgograd, FC Lada Togliatti – 1993, 1996
- Aleksey Muldarov – FC Mordovia Saransk – 2012
- Oleg Musin – FC Sokol Saratov – 2001–2002
- Vladimir Niederhaus – FC Rotor Volgograd – 1992–1997, 1999
- Maksim Nizovtsev – FC Baltika Kaliningrad, PFC CSKA Moscow, FC Sokol Saratov, FC Chernomorets Novorossiysk – 1996–1999, 2001, 2003
- Yevgeni Ovshinov – FC Uralan Elista – 1999–2000, 2002–2003
- Konstantin Pavlyuchenko – FC Lada Togliatti, FC Tekstilshchik Kamyshin – 1994–1996
- Aleksei Popov – FC Amkar Perm, FC Rubin Kazan – 2004–2012
- Mikhail Rozhkov – FC Rostov – 2009
- **Maksim Samorodov** – FC Akhmat Grozny – 2024–2026
- Yerkebulan Seydakhmet – FC Ufa – 2018
- Aleksey Shchyotkin – FC Rotor Volgograd – 2021
- Maksim Shevchenko – FC KamAZ-Chally Naberezhnye Chelny, FC Chernomorets Novorossiysk – 1997, 1999–2001
- Dmitry Shomko – FC Rotor Volgograd – 2021
- Andrey Shkurin – FC Chernomorets Novorossiysk – 1995–1999
- Andrei Sidelnikov – PFC Spartak Nalchik – 2007
- Aleksandr Sklyarov – FC Baltika Kaliningrad – 1997
- Lev Skvortsov – FC Khimki – 2023
- Samat Smakov – FC Rostselmash Rostov-on-Don – 2000–2001
- Yevgeni Tarasov – FC Zenit St. Petersburg, FC Sokol Saratov – 2000–2002
- Sergey Timofeev – FC Dynamo Moscow, FC Alania Vladikavkaz – 1992–1997
- Arsen Tlekhugov – FC Lokomotiv Nizhny Novgorod – 2000
- Rafael Urazbakhtin – FC Rostselmash Rostov-on-Don – 2001
- Roman Uzdenov – PFC Spartak Nalchik – 2007
- Sergei Volgin – FC Tekstilshchik Kamyshin – 1993–1995
- Valeriy Yablochkin – FC Lokomotiv Moscow – 1997
- Sergei Yegorov – FC Uralan Elista – 1999
- **Bakhtiyar Zaynutdinov** – FC Rostov, PFC CSKA Moscow, FC Dynamo Moscow – 2019–2023, 2025
- Georgy Zhukov – FC Ural Yekaterinburg – 2016
- Sergey Zhunenko – FC Rotor Volgograd – 1992, 1994–1997

== Kosovo ==
Note: As Russia does not recognize independence of Kosovo, all players representing Kosovo internationally are registered by Russian Premier League as citizens of a third country.

- Bernard Berisha – FC Anzhi Makhachkala, FC Terek Grozny/FC Akhmat Grozny – 2016–2025
- **Veldin Hodža** – FC Rubin Kazan – 2024–2026
- **Dardan Shabanhaxhaj** – FC Rubin Kazan – 2024–2026
- Ylldren Ibrahimaj – FC Ural Yekaterinburg – 2021

== Kyrgyzstan ==
- Nazim Ajiev – FC Lokomotiv Nizhny Novgorod – 1995
- Sergei Ivanov – FC Anzhi Makhachkala – 2001–2002
- Valery Kichin – FC Volga Nizhny Novgorod, FC Yenisey Krasnoyarsk – 2013, 2018–2019
- Anton Kochenkov – FC Rostov, FC Mordovia Saransk, FC Tom Tomsk, FC Lokomotiv Moscow, FC Arsenal Tula – 2011, 2014–2022
- Igor Tkachenko – FC Uralmash Yekaterinburg – 1992–1993

== Latvia ==
- Vitālijs Astafjevs – FC Rubin Kazan – 2004–2005
- Oļegs Blagonadeždins – FC Spartak-Alania Vladikavkaz – 2003
- Aleksandrs Cauņa – PFC CSKA Moscow – 2011–2016
- Aleksandrs Isakovs – FC Lokomotiv Nizhny Novgorod, FC Alania Vladikavkaz – 1999–2000
- Valērijs Ivanovs – FC Uralan Elista, FC Shinnik Yaroslavl – 1998–1999
- Aleksandrs Jeļisejevs – FC Uralan Elista – 1998
- Vladimirs Kamešs – FC Amkar Perm – 2013
- Ģirts Karlsons – FC Shinnik Yaroslavl – 2004
- Oskars Kļava – FC Anzhi Makhachkala – 2010
- Vladimirs Koļesņičenko – FC Moscow – 2003–2004
- Aleksandrs Koliņko – FC Rostov, FC Rubin Kazan, PFC Spartak Nalchik – 2003–2007, 2010
- Juris Laizāns – PFC CSKA Moscow, FC Torpedo Moscow, FC Rostov, FC Kuban Krasnodar, FC Shinnik Yaroslavl – 2001–2008
- Valentīns Lobaņovs – FC Shinnik Yaroslavl – 1999
- Mihails Miholaps – FC Spartak-Alania Vladikavkaz – 2003
- Ēriks Pelcis – FC Anzhi Makhachkala – 2002
- Andrejs Prohorenkovs – FC Dynamo Moscow – 2004–2005
- Vīts Rimkus – FC Rostov – 2005
- Andrejs Rubins – FC Shinnik Yaroslavl, FC Spartak Moscow – 2003–2006
- Dzintars Sproģis – FC Energiya-Tekstilshchik Kamyshin – 1996
- Igors Stepanovs – FC Shinnik Yaroslavl – 2008
- Andrejs Štolcers – FC Spartak Moscow – 2000
- Igors Troickis – FC Baltika Kaliningrad – 1997
- Kirill Varaksin – FC KamAZ Naberezhnye Chelny – 1994

== Liberia ==
- Sylvanus Nimely – FC Spartak Moscow – 2018
- Sekou Oliseh – PFC CSKA Moscow, FC Kuban Krasnodar – 2009–2012, 2014
- Dioh Williams – FC Alania Vladikavkaz – 2010

== Lithuania ==
- Vytautas Apanavičius – FC Baltika Kaliningrad – 1997
- Giedrius Arlauskis – FC Rubin Kazan – 2010–2012
- Virginijus Baltušnikas – FC Lokomotiv Nizhny Novgorod – 1996–1997
- Nerijus Barasa – FC Krylia Sovetov Samara, FC Alania Vladikavkaz – 2001–2005
- Algimantas Briaunys – FC Asmaral Moscow – 1992
- Orestas Buitkus – FC Baltika Kaliningrad, FC Rubin Kazan – 1997–1998, 2005
- Fedor Černych – FC Dynamo Moscow, FC Orenburg – 2018–2020
- Deividas Česnauskis – FC Dynamo Moscow, FC Lokomotiv Moscow – 2000–2004
- Edgaras Česnauskis – FC Saturn Ramenskoye, FC Moscow, FC Dynamo Moscow, FC Rostov – 2006–2013
- Vidas Dančenka – FC Uralan Elista – 1999–2000
- Tomas Danilevičius – FC Dynamo Moscow – 1998
- Ignas Dedura – FC Torpedo-ZIL Moscow, FC Spartak Moscow – 2001, 2004–2009
- Rolandas Džiaukštas – FC Saturn Ramenskoye, FC Moscow – 2001–2007
- Artūras Fomenka – FC Rostselmash Rostov-on-Don – 2000–2002
- Andrius Gedgaudas – FC Tom Tomsk – 2005
- Tadas Gražiūnas – FC Rostselmash Rostov-on-Don, FC Torpedo-ZIL Moscow – 2000–2001
- Darius Gvildys – FC Lokomotiv Nizhny Novgorod – 1999
- Algis Jankauskas – FC Amkar Perm – 2004–2005
- Edgaras Jankauskas – PFC CSKA Moscow, FC Torpedo-Luzhniki Moscow – 1996–1997
- Andrius Jokšas – FC Krylia Sovetov Samara – 2000–2001
- Mindaugas Kalonas – FC Kuban Krasnodar – 2007
- Žydrūnas Karčemarskas – FC Dynamo Moscow – 2003–2008
- Igoris Kirilovas – FC KamAZ-Chally Naberezhnye Chelny – 1997
- Arūnas Klimavičius – FC Dynamo Moscow, FC Sibir Novosibirsk – 2007–2008, 2010
- Darius Maciulevičius – FC Alania Vladikavkaz – 1997
- Valdemaras Martinkėnas – FC KamAZ Naberezhnye Chelny – 1997
- Darius Miceika – FC Zenit St. Petersburg – 2002
- Saulius Mikalajūnas – FC Uralan Elista, FC Torpedo-ZIL Moscow – 1999–2002
- Tomas Mikuckis – FC Torpedo Moscow – 2015
- Viktoras Olšanskis – FC Baltika Kaliningrad – 1997
- Tadas Papečkys – FC Anzhi Makhachkala – 2002
- Vadimas Petrenko – FC Lokomotiv Nizhny Novgorod – 2000
- Eimantas Poderis – FC Alania Vladikavkaz – 1997
- Robertas Poškus – FC Krylia Sovetov Samara, FC Zenit St. Petersburg, FC Dynamo Moscow, FC Rostov – 2002–2007
- Aidas Preikšaitis – FC Torpedo-Luzhniki Moscow, FC KAMAZ-Chally Naberezhnye Chelny – 1997
- Nerijus Radžius – FC Chernomorets Novorossiysk – 2003
- Tomas Ražanauskas – FC Torpedo-Luzhniki Moscow, FC KAMAZ-Chally Naberezhnye Chelny – 1997
- Mantas Samusiovas – FC Torpedo Moscow, FC Khimki – 2003–2005, 2007–2008
- Darius Sanajevas – FC Alania Vladikavkaz – 1998
- Mantas Savėnas – FC Sibir Novosibirsk – 2010
- Deividas Šemberas – FC Dynamo Moscow, PFC CSKA Moscow, FC Alania Vladikavkaz– 1998–2013
- Darvydas Šernas – PFC Spartak Nalchik – 2008
- Andrius Skerla – FC Tom Tomsk – 2005–2006
- Audrius Šlekys – FC Alania Vladikavkaz – 1998
- Gintaras Staučė – FC Spartak Moscow – 1992–1994
- Irmantas Stumbrys – FC Zenit St. Petersburg – 1997
- Tomas Tamošauskas – FC Dynamo Moscow – 2003
- Valdas Trakys – FC Torpedo Moscow, FC Kuban Krasnodar – 2000, 2004
- Nerijus Vasiliauskas – FC Lokomotiv Nizhny Novgorod – 2000
- Andrius Velička – FC Anzhi Makhachkala – 2002
- Darius Žutautas – FC Alania Vladikavkaz, FC Dynamo Moscow – 1999–2002, 2005
- Giedrius Žutautas – FC KamAZ-Chally Naberezhnye Chelny – 1997
- Raimondas Žutautas – FC Alania Vladikavkaz – 1997–1999
- Rimantas Žvingilas – FC Torpedo Moscow – 2000

== Luxembourg ==
- **Christopher Martins** – FC Spartak Moscow – 2022–2026
- Olivier Thill – FC Ufa – 2018–2020
- Sébastien Thill – FC Tambov – 2020

== Malawi ==
- Essau Kanyenda – FC Rostov, FC Lokomotiv Moscow – 2003–2007

== Mali ==
- Moussa Doumbia – FC Rostov, FC Arsenal Tula – 2014–2017
- **Nathan Gassama** – FC Baltika Kaliningrad – 2023–2026
- Sékou Koïta – PFC CSKA Moscow – 2024–2025
- Mamadou Maiga – FC Pari Nizhny Novgorod – 2022–2026 (acquired Russian citizenship in 2021)
- **Kalidou Sidibé** – FC Akhmat Grozny – 2026
- Moussa Sissako – PFC Sochi – 2022–2023
- Samba Sow – FC Dynamo Moscow – 2017–2019
- Dramane Traoré – FC Lokomotiv Moscow, FC Kuban Krasnodar – 2006–2010

== Mexico ==
- **Luis Chávez** – FC Dynamo Moscow – 2023–2026
- **César Montes** – FC Lokomotiv Moscow – 2024–2026

== Moldova ==
- Alexandru Antoniuc – FC Rubin Kazan – 2010–2011
- Igor Armaș – FC Kuban Krasnodar, FC Anzhi Makhachkala – 2011–2018
- Victor Berco – FC Shinnik Yaroslavl – 2002–2003
- Vitalie Bordian – FC Volga Nizhny Novgorod – 2013
- Simeon Bulgaru – FC Alania Vladikavkaz, FC Volga Nizhny Novgorod – 2010, 2012–2014
- Mihail Caimacov – FC Torpedo Moscow – 2022–2023
- Emil Caras – FC Tyumen – 1997
- Cătălin Carp – FC Ufa, FC Tambov – 2017–2021
- Valeriu Catînsus – FC Tom Tomsk – 2005–2009
- Ilie Cebanu – FC Tom Tomsk, FC Mordovia Saransk – 2013–2016
- Eugeniu Cebotaru – PFC Spartak Nalchik – 2012
- Valeriu Ciupercă – FC Krasnodar, FC Tom Tomsk, FC Rostov, FC Tambov – 2012, 2016–2020
- Serghei Cleșcenco – FC Zenit St. Petersburg, FC Chernomorets Novorossiysk – 1998, 2003
- Vasile Coșelev – FC Krylia Sovetov Samara, FC Uralan Elista – 1999–2000
- Alexandr Covalenco – FC Dynamo Moscow – 2002–2005
- Serghei Covalciuc – FC Spartak Moscow, FC Tom Tomsk – 2004–2010
- Alexandru Curtianu – FC Zenit St. Petersburg, FC Torpedo-ZIL Moscow – 1998–2000, 2002
- Sergiu Dadu – FC Alania Vladikavkaz, PFC CSKA Moscow – 2003–2005, 2010
- Dumitru Dolgov – FC Terek Grozny – 2008
- Alexandru Epureanu – FC Moscow, FC Dynamo Moscow, FC Krylia Sovetov Samara, FC Anzhi Makhachkala – 2007–2014
- Sergiu Epureanu – FC Sokol Saratov – 2002
- Viorel Frunză – PFC Spartak Nalchik – 2008
- Alexandru Gațcan – FC Rubin Kazan, FC Rostov, PFC Krylia Sovetov Samara – 2006–2007, 2009–2020
- Radu Gînsari – FC Krylia Sovetov Samara – 2019
- Victor Golovatenco – FC Khimki – 2007–2009
- Stanislav Ivanov – FC Moscow, FC Lokomotiv Moscow, FC Krylia Sovetov Samara, FC Rostov – 2004–2011
- Nicolae Josan – FC Anzhi Makhachkala – 2010
- Vladislav Lungu – FC Alania Vladikavkaz – 2005
- Vitali Maevici – FC Uralan Elista, FC Alania Vladikavkaz – 1999–2000
- Ivan Mandricenco – FC Kuban Krasnodar – 1992
- Nichita Moțpan – FC Fakel Voronezh – 2023–2025
- Stanislav Namașco – PFC Spartak Nalchik – 2011
- Ghenadie Olexici – FC Amkar Perm, FC Shinnik Yaroslavl – 2004–2006, 2008
- Victor Patrașco – FC Ufa – 2017
- Igor Picușceac – FC Krasnodar, FC Amkar Perm – 2011–2015
- Mihai Plătică – FC Rostov – 2015
- Alexandru Popovici – FC Dynamo Moscow – 1999
- Oleg Reabciuk – FC Spartak Moscow – 2023–2026
- Radu Rebeja – FC Uralan Elista, FC Saturn Ramenskoye, FC Moscow, FC Khimki – 1999–2008
- Serghei Rogaciov – FC Saturn Ramenskoye – 2000–2005
- Iurie Scala – FC Lada Togliatti – 1994
- Ștefan Sicaci – FC Terek Grozny – 2008
- Eugen Sidorenco – FC Tom Tomsk – 2013
- Oleg Șișchin – PFC CSKA Moscow, FC Saturn Ramenskoye, FC Tom Tomsk – 1999–2001, 2005–2006
- Adrian Sosnovschi – FC Saturn Ramenskoye, FC Chernomorets Novorossiysk – 1999–2003
- Dmitri Stajila – FC Kuban Krasnodar – 2016
- Gheorghe Stratulat – FC Alania Vladikavkaz – 2000–2001
- Alexandru Suharev – FC Alania Vladikavkaz – 1997
- Mihail Tcaciuk – FC KamAZ-Chally Naberezhnye Chelny – 1996
- Boris Tropaneț – FC KamAZ Naberezhnye Chelny – 1993–1997

== Montenegro ==
- Marko Baša – FC Lokomotiv Moscow – 2008–2011
- Radoslav Batak – FC Dynamo Moscow – 2003–2005
- Fatos Bećiraj – FC Dynamo Moscow – 2016–2017
- Mladen Božović – FC Tom Tomsk – 2013
- Vladimir Božović – FC Mordovia Saransk – 2013–2015
- Vladan Bubanja – FC Orenburg – 2025
- Radosav Bulić – FC Rubin Kazan – 2004
- Zaim Divanović – FC Akhmat Grozny – 2023–2025
- Radomir Đalović – FC Amkar Perm – 2011–2012
- Luka Đorđević – FC Zenit St. Petersburg, FC Arsenal Tula, FC Lokomotiv Moscow, PFC Sochi – 2012–2013, 2016–2023
- Nikola Drinčić – FC Amkar Perm, FC Spartak Moscow, FC Krasnodar – 2007–2013
- Miodrag Džudović – PFC Spartak Nalchik – 2006–2012
- Sead Hakšabanović – FC Rubin Kazan – 2021–2022
- Milan Jovanović – PFC Spartak Nalchik – 2010–2011
- Mladen Kašćelan – FC Arsenal Tula, FC Tosno – 2014–2015, 2017
- Dušan Lagator – PFC Sochi – 2019–2020
- **Stefan Lončar** – FC Akron Tolyatti – 2024–2026
- Vojvoda Malesija – FC Uralan Elista – 2000
- Stefan Melentijević – FC Khimki – 2023, 2025
- Nemanja Mijušković – FC Tosno – 2018
- Bogdan Milić – PFC Spartak Nalchik – 2011
- Mitar Novaković – FC Amkar Perm – 2008–2013
- Marko Obradović – FC Yenisey Krasnoyarsk – 2018
- Rade Petrović – FC Terek Grozny – 2008
- Marko Rakonjac – FC Lokomotiv Moscow – 2022
- Bojan Roganović – FC Torpedo Moscow – 2022–2023
- Marko Simić – FC Rostov – 2017
- Jovan Tanasijević – FC Dynamo Moscow, FC Rostov – 2003–2009
- **Igor Vujačić** – FC Rubin Kazan – 2023–2026
- Vladimir Vujović – FC Luch-Energiya Vladivostok – 2008
- Simon Vukčević – FC Saturn Ramenskoye – 2006–2007
- Miodrag Zec – FC Alania Vladikavkaz – 2004

== Morocco ==
- Ismaïl Aissati – FC Terek Grozny – 2013–2016
- Yahya Attiyat Allah – PFC Sochi – 2024–2025
- Abdelillah Bagui – FC Spartak Moscow, FC Rostov – 2003, 2005–2006
- Mustapha Bidoudane – FC Rostov – 2005
- Mbark Boussoufa – FC Anzhi Makhachkala, FC Lokomotiv Moscow – 2011–2015
- Mehdi Carcela – FC Anzhi Makhachkala – 2011–2013
- Manuel da Costa – FC Lokomotiv Moscow – 2011–2012
- Anas El Mahraoui – FC Akhmat Grozny, FC Orenburg – 2025–2026
- **Hodaifa El Mhassani** – FC Fakel Voronezh – 2026
- El Mehdi El Moubarik – FC Dynamo Makhachkala – 2025–2026
- Khalid Fouhami – FC Alania Vladikavkaz – 2004
- Abdelkarim Kissi – FC Rubin Kazan – 2003–2004
- El Mehdi Maouhoub – FC Dynamo Moscow – 2024–2026
- **Fahd Moufi** – FC Orenburg, FC Baltika Kaliningrad – 2025–2026
- **Aymane Mourid** – FC Baltika Kaliningrad – 2025–2026
- Amine Talal – FC Akhmat Grozny – 2024–2025
- Noureddine Ziyati – FC Amkar Perm – 2004–2006

== Netherlands ==
- Otman Bakkal – FC Dynamo Moscow – 2012
- Glenn Bijl – PFC Krylia Sovetov Samara – 2021–2025
- Alexander Büttner – FC Dynamo Moscow – 2014–2015
- Romeo Castelen – FC Volga Nizhny Novgorod – 2013
- Demy de Zeeuw – FC Spartak Moscow – 2011–2012
- Douglas – FC Dynamo Moscow – 2013–2015
- Royston Drenthe – FC Alania Vladikavkaz – 2013
- Lorenzo Ebecilio – FC Mordovia Saransk, FC Anzhi Makhachkala – 2014–2016
- Jorrit Hendrix – FC Spartak Moscow – 2021
- Othman El Kabir – FC Ural Yekaterinburg – 2018–2021
- Dylan Mertens – FC Fakel Voronezh – 2024–2025
- Gianluca Nijholt – FC Amkar Perm – 2012–2014
- Quincy Promes – FC Spartak Moscow – 2014–2018, 2021–2023
- Fernando Ricksen – FC Zenit St. Petersburg – 2006–2008
- Guus Til – FC Spartak Moscow – 2019–2020
- Tonny Vilhena – FC Krasnodar – 2019–2021
- Rai Vloet – FC Ural Yekaterinburg – 2022–2024

== Niger ==
- Moussa Maâzou – PFC CSKA Moscow – 2009
- Amadou Moutari – FC Anzhi Makhachkala – 2015–2016
- **Oumar Sako** – FC Rostov – 2024–2026

== Nigeria ==
- Saminu Abdullahi – FC Khimki – 2024
- Dele Adeleye – FC Anzhi Makhachkala, FC SKA-Khabarovsk – 2013, 2018
- Abdulwaheed Afolabi – FC Kuban Krasnodar – 2012
- Solomon Agbalaka – PFC Sochi – 2023
- **Ibraheem Mahfus Ajasa** – FC Rostov – 2025
- Haruna Babangida – FC Kuban Krasnodar – 2009
- Benito – FC Tambov – 2019
- Geoffrey Chinedu – PFC Krylia Sovetov Samara – 2026
- Justice Christopher – FC Alania Vladikavkaz – 2005
- Moses Cobnan – FC Krasnodar – 2023–2026
- Babajide Collins Babatunde – FC Alania Vladikavkaz – 2010
- Bright Dike – FC Amkar Perm – 2016
- Augustine Eguavoen – FC Torpedo Moscow – 1997–1998
- Chidera Ejuke – PFC CSKA Moscow – 2020–2022
- Isah Eliakwu – FC Anzhi Makhachkala – 2011
- Emmanuel Emenike – FC Spartak Moscow – 2011–2013
- Joseph Enakarhire – FC Dynamo Moscow – 2005
- Richard Eromoigbe – FC Khimki – 2008
- Ededem Essien – FC Pari Nizhny Novgorod – 2023
- Okon Flo Essien – FC Spartak Moscow – 2001–2003
- Kehinde Fatai – FC Ufa – 2016–2018
- Idriss Harouna – FC Rostselmash Rostov-on-Don – 2001
- Lukman Haruna – FC Anzhi Makhachkala – 2015
- Ezekiel Henty – FC Lokomotiv Moscow – 2016
- Brian Idowu – FC Amkar Perm, FC Lokomotiv Moscow, FC Khimki – 2012, 2014–2023
- Sylvester Igboun – FC Ufa, FC Dynamo Moscow, FC Nizhny Novgorod – 2015–2022
- Lucky Isibor – FC Dynamo Moscow – 1998–2000
- Sani Kaita – FC Kuban Krasnodar, FC Lokomotiv Moscow, FC Alania Vladikavkaz – 2009–2010
- Obafemi Martins – FC Rubin Kazan – 2010–2012
- Jerry Mbakogu – FC Krylia Sovetov Samara – 2016
- Victor Moses – FC Spartak Moscow – 2020–2024
- Ahmed Musa – PFC CSKA Moscow – 2012–2016, 2018
- Ifeanyi David Nduka – FC Krasnodar – 2023
- Lawrence Nicholas – FC Tambov, FC Khimki – 2020, 2022
- Victor Obinna – FC Lokomotiv Moscow – 2011–2013
- James Obiorah – FC Lokomotiv Moscow – 2001–2002, 2004
- Peter Odemwingie – FC Lokomotiv Moscow – 2007–2010
- Chidi Odiah – PFC CSKA Moscow – 2004–2011
- **Chinonso Offor** – FC Baltika Kaliningrad – 2025–2026
- Fegor Ogude – FC Amkar Perm, FC Yenisey Krasnoyarsk – 2014–2019
- Samuel Ogunsania – FC Spartak Moscow – 2002
- Emmanuel Okoduwa – FC Kuban Krasnodar – 2007, 2009
- Isaac Okoronkwo – FC Alania Vladikavkaz, FC Moscow, FC Rostov – 2005–2013
- Jonathan Okoronkwo – FC Krasnodar – 2022
- Solomon Okoronkwo – FC Saturn Ramenskoye – 2008–2009
- Aaron Samuel Olanare – PFC CSKA Moscow, FC Amkar Perm – 2016–2018
- **Olakunle Olusegun** – FC Krasnodar, FC Pari Nizhny Novgorod, FC Rostov – 2022–2026
- Patrick Ovie – FC Krylia Sovetov Samara, FC Dynamo Moscow – 2002–2006
- Omonigho Temile – FC Krylia Sovetov Samara – 2004–2006
- Duke Udi – FC Krylia Sovetov Samara – 2002
- Louis Udoh – FC Chernomorets Novorossiysk – 2001
- Mohammed Usman – FC Tambov – 2019
- Izunna Uzochukwu – FC Amkar Perm – 2015
- Tenton Yenne – FC Baltika Kaliningrad – 2025–2026

== North Korea ==
- Choe Myong-ho – FC Krylia Sovetov Samara – 2008
- Hong Yong-jo – FC Rostov – 2009–2010

== North Macedonia ==
- Fikret Alomerović – FC Torpedo-Luzhniki Moscow – 1997
- Dragan Čadikovski – FC Zenit St. Petersburg – 2005
- Bojan Dimoski – FC Akron Tolyatti – 2024
- Goran Dimovski – FC Terek Grozny – 2008
- Nikola Gjoševski – FC Spartak Moscow – 2001
- Adis Jahović – FC Krylia Sovetov Samara – 2015–2016
- Nikola Karčev – FC Terek Grozny – 2008
- Igor Kralevski – FC Luch-Energiya Vladivostok – 2007–2008
- Goran Maznov – FC Torpedo-ZIL Moscow, FC Tom Tomsk – 2002, 2007–2010
- Igor Mitreski – FC Spartak Moscow – 2001–2004
- Stevica Ristić – FC Amkar Perm – 2010–2011
- Marko Simonovski – FC Amkar Perm – 2014
- Igor Stamenovski – FC Spartak Moscow – 2001
- Veliče Šumulikoski – FC Zenit St. Petersburg, FC Sibir Novosibirsk – 2004–2006, 2010
- David Toshevski – FC Rostov – 2020, 2023

== Norway ==
- Haitam Aleesami – FC Rostov – 2020–2021
- Chuma Anene – FC Amkar Perm – 2015–2017
- Emil Bohinen – PFC CSKA Moscow – 2021
- Erik Hagen – FC Zenit St. Petersburg – 2005–2007
- Jørgen Jalland – FC Rubin Kazan – 2005–2006
- Magnus Nordengen Knudsen – FC Rostov – 2022
- Lars Olden Larsen – FC Nizhny Novgorod – 2022
- Mathias Normann – FC Rostov, FC Dynamo Moscow – 2019–2023
- Stefan Strandberg – FC Krasnodar, FC Ural Yekaterinburg – 2015–2016, 2019–2021

== Panama ==
- **Eduardo Anderson** – FC Baltika Kaliningrad – 2026
- Alberto Blanco – FC Alania Vladikavkaz – 2005
- Edgardo Fariña – FC Khimki, FC Pari Nizhny Novgorod – 2024–2026

== Paraguay ==
- Diego Acosta – FC Orenburg – 2022
- Júnior Alonso – FC Krasnodar – 2023–2024
- Fabián Balbuena – FC Dynamo Moscow – 2021–2025
- Fredy Bareiro – FC Saturn Ramenskoye – 2005–2006
- Lucas Barrios – FC Spartak Moscow – 2013–2014
- Luis Nery Caballero – FC Krylia Sovetov Samara – 2012–2014
- **Juan José Cáceres** – FC Dynamo Moscow – 2025–2026
- Alexis Cantero – FC Orenburg – 2026
- Óscar Díaz – FC Saturn Ramenskoye, FC Rubin Kazan – 2004–2005
- Alexis Duarte – FC Spartak Moscow – 2023–2025
- **Roberto Fernández** – FC Dynamo Moscow – 2022–2026
- Jesús Medina – PFC CSKA Moscow, FC Spartak Moscow – 2022–2025
- Lorenzo Melgarejo – FC Kuban Krasnodar, FC Spartak Moscow – 2013–2020
- Rodrigo Ruiz Díaz – FC Akhmat Grozny – 2025
- Nelson Valdez – FC Rubin Kazan – 2011–2012
- Pablo Zeballos – FC Krylia Sovetov Samara – 2012

== Peru ==
- Rivelino Carassa – FC Alania Vladikavkaz – 2003–2004
- Christian Cueva – FC Krasnodar – 2018
- Jefferson Farfán – FC Lokomotiv Moscow – 2017–2020
- Martín Hidalgo – FC Saturn Ramenskoye – 2003, 2005
- Andrés Mendoza – FC Dynamo Moscow – 2006
- **Yordy Reyna** – FC Torpedo Moscow, FC Rodina Moscow – 2023, 2026
- Carlos Zambrano – FC Rubin Kazan – 2016–2017

== Poland ==
- Rafał Augustyniak – FC Ural Yekaterinburg – 2019–2022
- Ariel Borysiuk – FC Volga Nizhny Novgorod – 2014
- Janusz Gol – FC Amkar Perm – 2013–2018
- Damian Gorawski – FC Moscow, FC Shinnik Yaroslavl – 2005–2008
- Bartłomiej Grzelak – FC Sibir Novosibirsk – 2010
- Dawid Janczyk – PFC CSKA Moscow – 2007–2008
- Artur Jędrzejczyk – FC Krasnodar – 2013–2016
- Mariusz Jop – FC Moscow – 2004–2009
- Adam Kokoszka – FC Torpedo Moscow – 2014–2015
- Marcin Komorowski – FC Terek Grozny – 2012–2015
- Marcin Kowalczyk – FC Dynamo Moscow, FC Volga Nizhny Novgorod – 2008–2010, 2013–2014
- Wojciech Kowalewski – FC Spartak Moscow, FC Sibir Novosibirsk – 2003–2006, 2010
- Grzegorz Krychowiak – FC Lokomotiv Moscow, FC Krasnodar – 2018–2021
- Michał Kucharczyk – FC Ural Yekaterinburg – 2019–2020
- Marcin Kuś – FC Torpedo Moscow – 2006
- Krzysztof Łągiewka – FC Shinnik Yaroslavl, FC Krylia Sovetov Samara, FC Kuban Krasnodar – 2004–2009
- Maciej Makuszewski – FC Terek Grozny – 2012–2013
- Konrad Michalak – FC Akhmat Grozny – 2019
- Rafał Murawski – FC Rubin Kazan – 2009–2010
- Grzegorz Piechna – FC Torpedo Moscow – 2006
- Piotr Polczak – FC Terek Grozny, FC Volga Nizhny Novgorod – 2011–2014
- Maciej Rybus – FC Terek Grozny, FC Lokomotiv Moscow, FC Spartak Moscow, FC Rubin Kazan – 2012–2024
- Łukasz Sekulski – FC SKA-Khabarovsk – 2018
- Damian Szymański – FC Akhmat Grozny – 2019
- Sebastian Szymański – FC Dynamo Moscow – 2019–2022
- Jarosław Tkocz – FC Shinnik Yaroslavl – 2004
- Jakub Wawrzyniak – FC Amkar Perm – 2014
- Maciej Wilusz – FC Rostov, FC Ural Yekaterinburg – 2017–2018, 2020
- Damian Zbozień – FC Amkar Perm – 2014

== Portugal ==
- Márcio Abreu – FC Krasnodar – 2011–2014
- Hugo Almeida – FC Kuban Krasnodar, FC Anzhi Makhachkala – 2015
- Bruno Alves – FC Zenit St. Petersburg – 2010–2013
- Ricardo Alves – FC Orenburg – 2018–2020
- Bruno Basto – FC Shinnik Yaroslavl – 2008
- Miguel Cardoso – FC Dynamo Moscow, FC Tambov – 2018–2020
- Costinha – FC Dynamo Moscow – 2005
- Custódio – FC Dynamo Moscow – 2007
- Danny – FC Dynamo Moscow, FC Zenit St. Petersburg – 2005–2017
- Yannick Djaló – FC Mordovia Saransk – 2015
- Eder – FC Lokomotiv Moscow – 2017–2021
- **Rodrigo Escoval** – FC Akron Tolyatti – 2024–2026
- Fábio Felício – FC Rubin Kazan – 2007
- **Gedson Fernandes** – FC Spartak Moscow – 2025–2026
- Manuel Fernandes – FC Lokomotiv Moscow, FC Krasnodar – 2014–2020
- Nuno Frechaut – FC Dynamo Moscow – 2005
- Kiki Afonso – FC Ural Yekaterinburg – 2023–2024
- João Lameira – FC Baltika Kaliningrad – 2023
- Luís Loureiro – FC Dynamo Moscow – 2005
- Maniche – FC Dynamo Moscow – 2005
- Ricardo Mangas – FC Spartak Moscow – 2024–2025
- João Mário – FC Lokomotiv Moscow – 2019–2020
- Fernando Meira – FC Zenit St. Petersburg – 2009–2011
- Rui Miguel – FC Krasnodar – 2011
- Luís Neto – FC Zenit St. Petersburg – 2013–2019
- Nuno – FC Dynamo Moscow – 2005
- Jorge Ribeiro – FC Dynamo Moscow – 2005
- Tiago Rodrigues – FC Ufa – 2022
- **João Silva** – FC Orenburg – 2026
- Ricardo Silva – FC Shinnik Yaroslavl – 2008
- Tomás Tavares – FC Spartak Moscow – 2023–2024
- Hugo Vieira – FC Torpedo Moscow – 2014–2015

== Romania ==
- Marian Alexandru – FC Alania Vladikavkaz – 2001
- Paul Anton – FC Anzhi Makhachkala, FC Krylia Sovetov Samara – 2018–2020
- Iulian Arhire – FC Alania Vladikavkaz – 2000
- Cosmin Bărcăuan – FC Krylia Sovetov Samara – 2005
- Eric Bicfalvi – FC Tom Tomsk, FC Ural Yekaterinburg – 2016–2024
- Valeriu Bordeanu – FC Kuban Krasnodar – 2004
- Alexandru Bourceanu – FC Arsenal Tula – 2017
- Marius Bratu – FC Uralan Elista – 2002
- Gheorghe Bucur – FC Kuban Krasnodar – 2011–2016
- Zeno Bundea – FC Zenit St. Petersburg – 2002
- Daniel Chiriță – FC Zenit St. Petersburg – 2002–2004
- Răzvan Cociș – FC Lokomotiv Moscow, FC Rostov – 2007–2009, 2011–2013
- Florin Costea – FC Arsenal Tula – 2015
- Ovidiu Dănănae – FC Tom Tomsk – 2011
- Cristian Dancia – FC Torpedo Moscow – 2004–2006
- Iulian Dăniță – FC Chernomorets Novorossiysk – 2003
- Mihai Drăguș – FC Torpedo Moscow, FC Lokomotiv Nizhny Novgorod – 1999–2000
- Gabriel Enache – FC Rubin Kazan – 2018
- George Florescu – FC Torpedo Moscow, FC Alania Vladikavkaz, FC Dynamo Moscow – 2006, 2010, 2013–2014
- Sorin Ghionea – FC Rostov – 2010
- Gabriel Giurgiu – FC Rubin Kazan – 2007
- Nicolae Grigore – FC Alania Vladikavkaz – 2001–2003
- Gheorghe Grozav – FC Terek Grozny – 2013–2017
- Gabriel Iancu – FC Akhmat Grozny – 2021
- Adrian Iencsi – FC Spartak Moscow – 2004–2006
- Adrian Iordache – FC Shinnik Yaroslavl – 2006
- Andrei Ivan – FC Krasnodar – 2017–2018
- Erik Lincar – FC Amkar Perm – 2004–2006
- Andrei Mărgăritescu – FC Terek Grozny – 2008–2009
- Ioan Mera – FC Alania Vladikavkaz – 2012
- Damian Militaru – FC Shinnik Yaroslavl – 1999
- Florinel Mirea – FC Alania Vladikavkaz – 2000–2001
- Andrei Mureșan – FC Kuban Krasnodar – 2009
- Gabriel Mureșan – FC Tom Tomsk – 2013–2014
- **Ionuț Nedelcearu** – FC Ufa, FC Akron Tolyatti – 2018–2020, 2025–2026
- Daniel Niculae – FC Kuban Krasnodar – 2012–2013
- Norbert Niță – FC Uralan Elista – 2002
- Daniel Oprița – FC Mordovia Saransk – 2013
- Daniel Pancu – FC Terek Grozny – 2008–2009
- Ionel Pârvu – FC Chernomorets Novorossiysk – 2003
- Florentin Petre – FC Terek Grozny – 2008–2009
- Mihăiță Pleșan – FC Volga Nizhny Novgorod – 2011–2013
- Andrei Prepeliță – FC Rostov – 2016–2017
- Adrian Ropotan – FC Dynamo Moscow, FC Tom Tomsk, FC Volga Nizhny Novgorod – 2009–2014
- Florin Costin Șoavă – FC Spartak Moscow, FC Krylia Sovetov Samara, FC Khimki – 2004–2008
- Nicolae Stanciu – FC Anzhi Makhachkala – 2002
- Pompiliu Stoica – FC Moscow, FC Tom Tomsk – 2004–2008
- János Székely – FC Volga Nizhny Novgorod – 2011
- Gabriel Tamaș – FC Spartak Moscow – 2004, 2006
- Iulian Tameș – FC Alania Vladikavkaz – 2005
- Gabriel Torje – FC Terek Grozny – 2016–2017
- Cristian Tudor – FC Alania Vladikavkaz, FC Moscow – 2003–2005
- Alexandru Tudorie – FC Arsenal Tula – 2019, 2021
- Dacian Varga – FC Kuban Krasnodar – 2011

== Rwanda ==
- Gerard Gohou – FC Krasnodar – 2013

== Scotland ==
- Garry O'Connor – FC Lokomotiv Moscow – 2006–2007

== Senegal ==
- Ibrahima Baldé – FC Kuban Krasnodar – 2012–2016
- Keita Baldé – FC Spartak Moscow – 2022–2023
- Baye Djiby Fall – FC Lokomotiv Moscow – 2009, 2011
- Papa Amady Gadio – FC Akhmat Grozny – 2025–2026
- Marcel Gomis – FC Shinnik Yaroslavl – 2008
- Papa Gueye – FC Rostov – 2016
- Ibra Kébé – FC Spartak Moscow, FC Anzhi Makhachkala – 2001–2004, 2010–2011
- Pape Maguette Kebe – FC Rubin Kazan – 2003
- Moussa Konaté – FC Krasnodar – 2012–2013
- Ablaye Mbengue – FC Akhmat Grozny – 2015–2020
- Pascal Mendy – FC Dynamo Moscow – 2003–2006
- Baye Gueye Ndiaga – FC Rubin Kazan – 2003
- **Ousmane Ndong** – FC Akhmat Grozny – 2025–2026
- Ibrahima Niasse – FC Mordovia Saransk – 2014–2015
- Oumar Niasse – FC Lokomotiv Moscow – 2014–2015
- Dame N'Doye – FC Lokomotiv Moscow – 2012–2014
- Babacar Sarr – FC Yenisey Krasnoyarsk – 2019
- Mamadou Sylla – FC Orenburg – 2020
- Khaly Thiam – FC Dynamo Moscow – 2017
- Pape Thiaw – FC Dynamo Moscow – 2002

== Serbia ==
- Predrag Alempijević – FC Uralan Elista – 2000
- Dušan Anđelković – FC Rostov, FC Krasnodar – 2009–2013
- Nemanja Anđelković – FC Khimki – 2024
- Komnen Andrić – FC Ufa – 2020–2021
- Nikola Antić – FC Khimki – 2023
- **Srđan Babić** – FC Spartak Moscow – 2023–2026
- **Mihajlo Banjac** – FC Krasnodar, PFC Krylia Sovetov Samara – 2022–2026
- Stevan Bates – FC Alania Vladikavkaz – 2004
- Nenad Begović – FC Luch-Energiya Vladivostok – 2008
- Marko Blažić – FC Amkar Perm – 2011–2012
- **Miroslav Bogosavac** – FC Akhmat Grozny – 2020–2026
- Vidak Bratić – FC Dynamo Moscow – 2003–2004
- Goran Čaušić – FC Arsenal Tula – 2017–2022
- Aleksandar Ćirković – PFC Krylia Sovetov Samara – 2022–2023
- Nenad Ćirković – FC Uralan Elista – 2000
- Nikola Čumić – FC Rubin Kazan – 2023–2025
- Vladica Ćurčić – FC Alania Vladikavkaz – 2000
- Ivan Cvetković – FC Khimki – 2009
- Nikola Damjanac – FC Saturn-RenTV Ramenskoye – 2002
- Đorđe Despotović – FC Orenburg, FC Rubin Kazan, FC Arsenal Tula – 2018–2022
- Dominik Dinga – FC Ural Yekaterinburg – 2016–2018
- Nenad Đorđević – FC Krylia Sovetov Samara – 2010–2011
- Slavoljub Đorđević – FC Alania Vladikavkaz, FC Shinnik Yaroslavl – 2005, 2008
- **Aleksa Đurasović** – FC Akron Tolyatti – 2024–2026
- Rade Dugalić – FC Tosno, FC Yenisey Krasnoyarsk – 2017–2018
- Strahinja Eraković – FC Zenit St. Petersburg – 2023–2025
- **Milan Gajić** – PFC CSKA Moscow – 2022–2026
- Nemanja Glavčić – FC Khimki – 2022–2023
- Stevo Glogovac – FC Anzhi Makhachkala – 2002
- Jovan Golić – PFC Spartak Nalchik – 2010–2012
- Petar Golubović – FC Khimki – 2023–2025
- Nenad Injac – FC Amkar Perm – 2008
- Branislav Ivanović – FC Lokomotiv Moscow, FC Zenit St. Petersburg – 2006–2007, 2017–2020
- Nebojša Jelenković – FC Kuban Krasnodar – 2007
- Ivan Jević – FC Spartak-Alania Vladikavkaz – 2003
- **Bogdan Jočić** – FC Rubin Kazan – 2024–2026
- Đorđe Jokić – FC Torpedo Moscow, FC Tom Tomsk – 2005–2006, 2008–2011
- Nikola Jolović – FC Torpedo Moscow, FC Saturn Ramenskoye – 2001–2005
- Goran Jovanović – FC Anzhi Makhachkala – 2001
- Milan Jovanović – FC Lokomotiv Moscow – 2004
- Miodrag Jovanović – FC Chernomorets Novorossiysk, FC Khimki – 2000, 2007–2009
- Milan Jović – FC Spartak Moscow, FC Chernomorets Novorossiysk, FC Rostselmash Rostov-on-Don, FC Saturn-RenTV Ramenskoye – 2000–2003
- Branko Jovičić – FC Amkar Perm, FC Ural Yekaterinburg – 2014–2017, 2020–2021
- Mateja Kežman – FC Zenit St. Petersburg – 2009
- Zoran Knežević – FC Khimki – 2008
- Aleksandar Komadina – FC Torpedo-ZIL Moscow – 2002–2003
- Ognjen Koroman – FC Dynamo Moscow, FC Krylia Sovetov Samara, FC Terek Grozny – 2002–2005, 2011
- Zoran Kostić – FC Shinnik Yaroslavl – 2006
- Vladimir Kovačević – FC Dynamo Makhachkala – 2024
- Miloš Krasić – PFC CSKA Moscow – 2004–2010
- Miloš Kruščić – FC Rostov – 2001–2007
- Jovica Lakić – FC Torpedo Moscow, FC Torpedo-ZIL Moscow – 2001–2002
- Ognjen Lakić – FC Krylia Sovetov Samara – 2000
- Darko Lazić – FC Anzhi Makhachkala – 2015–2016
- Danko Lazović – FC Zenit St. Petersburg, FC Rostov – 2010–2013
- Milan Lešnjak – FC Saturn Ramenskoye – 2003–2005
- Marko Lomić – FC Dynamo Moscow, FC Mordovia Saransk – 2010–2016
- Aleksandar Luković – FC Zenit St. Petersburg – 2010–2013
- **Milan Majstorović** – FC Dynamo Moscow – 2023–2024, 2026
- Nikola Maksimović – FC Spartak Moscow – 2018
- Miroslav Marković – FC SKA-Khabarovsk – 2017–2018
- Nikola Mijailović – FC Khimki, FC Amkar Perm – 2008, 2011–2013
- Srđan Mijailović – FC Krylia Sovetov Samara – 2017–2020
- Predrag Mijić – FC Amkar Perm – 2011–2012
- Ivan Miladinović – PFC Sochi, FC Nizhny Novgorod – 2019–2023
- Draško Milekić – FC Uralan Elista – 2000
- Nemanja Miletić – FC Ufa – 2021
- Aleksandar Miljković – FC Amkar Perm – 2016–2018
- Savo Milošević – FC Rubin Kazan – 2008
- Marko Milovanović – FC Amkar Perm – 2007–2008
- Ognjen Mimović – FC Zenit St. Petersburg – 2025
- Dragan Mrđa – FC Khimki – 2007–2008
- Vladimir Mudrinić – FC Zenit St. Petersburg – 2002
- Albert Nađ – FC Rostov – 2007
- Nenad Nastić – FC Khimki – 2009
- Nemanja Nikolić – FC Rostov – 2013–2014
- Ratko Nikolić – FC Anzhi Makhachkala – 2001
- Rade Novković – FC Luch-Energiya Vladivostok – 2007–2008
- Milan Obradović – FC Lokomotiv Moscow – 2001–2003
- Ivan Ostojić – FC Baltika Kaliningrad – 2023–2024
- Ognjen Ožegović – FC Arsenal Tula, FC Pari Nizhny Novgorod – 2018–2019, 2024
- Radovan Pankov – FC Ural Yekaterinburg – 2016–2017
- Veljko Paunović – FC Rubin Kazan – 2007
- Nemanja Pejčinović – FC Lokomotiv Moscow – 2014–2018
- Mitar Peković – FC Anzhi Makhachkala – 2010
- Milan Perendija – FC Mordovia Saransk – 2013–2016
- Dušan Petković – FC Spartak Moscow, FC Saturn Ramenskoye – 2004, 2006–2007
- Marko Petković – FC Spartak Moscow – 2017–2018
- Nikola Petković – FC Tom Tomsk – 2010
- Aleksandar R. Petrović – FC Shinnik Yaroslavl – 2008
- Boško Petrović – FC Alania Vladikavkaz – 2001
- Branimir Petrović – FC Rubin Kazan, FC Rostov, FC Krylia Sovetov Samara – 2007, 2009–2010
- Mihajlo Pjanović – FC Spartak Moscow, FC Rostov – 2003–2007
- Marko Poletanović – FC Tosno – 2017–2018
- **Matija Popović** – PFC CSKA Moscow – 2025–2026
- Uroš Radaković – FC Orenburg, FC Arsenal Tula – 2019–2022
- Dejan Radić – FC Alania Vladikavkaz, PFC Spartak Nalchik, FC Rostov – 2004–2005, 2007–2011
- Nikola Radmanovac – FC Baltika Kaliningrad – 2023–2024
- Milan Radojičić – FC Torpedo-ZIL Moscow – 2001
- Slobodan Rajković – FC Lokomotiv Moscow – 2020
- Lazar Ranđelović – FC Ural Yekaterinburg, FC Rubin Kazan – 2022–2024
- Predrag Ranđelović – FC Anzhi Makhachkala, PFC CSKA Moscow, FC Zenit St. Petersburg – 2000–2003
- Vuk Rašović – FC Krylia Sovetov Samara – 2002
- Mihailo Ristić – FC Krasnodar – 2017
- Milan Rodić – FC Zenit St. Petersburg, FC Volga Nizhny Novgorod, FC Krylia Sovetov Samara – 2013–2017
- Sead Salahović – FC Alania Vladikavkaz – 2000
- Stefan Šapić – FC Torpedo Moscow – 2022
- Srđan Savičević – FC Uralan Elista – 2000
- Marko Šćepović – FC Terek Grozny – 2015
- Predrag Sikimić – FC Amkar Perm – 2007–2009
- Aleksandar Simčević – FC Mordovia Saransk – 2012
- Petar Škuletić – FC Lokomotiv Moscow – 2015–2016
- Nenad Šljivić – FC Rostov – 2009
- Uroš Spajić – FC Krasnodar – 2018–2019, 2021
- Goran Sretenović – FC Uralan Elista – 2000
- Sreten Sretenović – FC Kuban Krasnodar – 2009
- Srđan Stanić – FC Spartak Moscow – 2003
- Nenad Stojanović – FC Luch-Energiya Vladivostok – 2007
- Nemanja Stojić – PFC Sochi – 2025
- Dejan Stojković – FC Uralan Elista – 2000
- Nebojša Stojković – FC Anzhi Makhachkala – 2000–2002
- **Slobodan Tedić** – FC Akron Tolyatti – 2026
- Zoran Tošić – PFC CSKA Moscow – 2010–2017
- Goran Trobok – FC Spartak Moscow – 2003–2004
- Nikola Trujić – FC Tosno – 2017–2018
- Nemanja Tubić – FC Krasnodar, FC SKA-Khabarovsk – 2011–2013, 2018
- Nikola Valentić – FC Sibir Novosibirsk – 2010
- Radojica Vasić – FC Uralan Elista – 2000
- Nemanja Vidić – FC Spartak Moscow – 2004–2005
- **Milutin Vidosavljević** – FC Akron Tolyatti – 2026
- Milan Vještica – FC Zenit St. Petersburg, FC Rostov, FC Shinnik Yaroslavl, FC Ural Yekaterinburg – 2002–2008, 2013
- Mićo Vranješ – FC Uralan Elista – 2003
- Nemanja Vučićević – FC Lokomotiv Moscow – 2001–2003
- Vanja Vučićević – PFC Krylia Sovetov Samara – 2019
- Zvonimir Vukić – FC Moscow – 2008–2009
- Ivan Vukomanović – FC Dynamo Moscow – 2002–2003
- Saša Zdjelar – PFC CSKA Moscow, FC Zenit Saint Petersburg – 2022–2025
- Ivan Živanović – FC Rostov – 2009–2011

== Sierra Leone ==
- Mohamed Camara – FC Fakel Voronezh – 2001

== Slovakia ==
- Ladislav Almási – FC Akhmat Grozny – 2021
- Marek Bakoš – FC Shinnik Yaroslavl – 2006
- Michal Breznaník – FC Amkar Perm – 2012–2013
- Kamil Čontofalský – FC Zenit St. Petersburg – 2003–2007, 2009
- Juraj Dovičovič – FC Lokomotiv Moscow – 2000
- Ján Ďurica – FC Saturn Ramenskoye, FC Lokomotiv Moscow – 2006–2016
- Michal Ďuriš – FC Orenburg – 2017
- Branislav Fodrek – FC Saturn Ramenskoye – 2006
- Norbert Gyömbér – FC Terek Grozny – 2017
- Marián Had – FC Lokomotiv Moscow – 2006–2007
- Michal Hanek – FC Dynamo Moscow – 2003–2005
- Richard Höger – FC Lokomotiv Nizhny Novgorod – 1999
- Marek Hollý – FC Lokomotiv Nizhny Novgorod, PFC CSKA Moscow, FC Alania Vladikavkaz, FC Anzhi Makhachkala – 1999–2001
- Zsolt Hornyák – FC Dynamo Moscow – 2001–2002
- Tomáš Hubočan – FC Zenit St. Petersburg, FC Dynamo Moscow – 2008–2016
- Martin Jakubko – FC Saturn Ramenskoye, FC Khimki, FC Moscow, FC Dynamo Moscow, FC Amkar Perm – 2006–2010, 2012–2015
- Kamil Kopúnek – FC Saturn Moscow Oblast – 2010
- František Kubík – FC Kuban Krasnodar – 2011
- Róbert Mak – FC Zenit St. Petersburg – 2016–2019
- Ján Mucha – FC Krylia Sovetov Samara, FC Arsenal Tula – 2013–2015
- Branislav Obžera – FC Saturn Ramenskoye – 2006
- Pavol Pavlus – FC Chernomorets Novorossiysk – 2001
- Peter Petráš – FC Saturn Ramenskoye – 2006–2008
- Kornel Saláta – FC Rostov, FC Tom Tomsk – 2011–2014
- Martin Škrtel – FC Zenit St. Petersburg – 2004–2007
- Lukáš Tesák – FC Torpedo Moscow, FC Arsenal Tula – 2014–2016
- Radoslav Zabavník – FC Terek Grozny – 2008–2009

== Slovenia ==
- Gregor Balažic – FC Ural Yekaterinburg – 2017–2018
- Jaka Bijol – PFC CSKA Moscow – 2018–2022
- Lovro Bizjak – FC Ufa – 2018–2020
- Matija Boben – FC Rostov – 2017–2018
- Nastja Čeh – FC Khimki – 2007–2008
- Jan Đapo – FC Dynamo Makhachkala – 2024–2026
- Vanja Drkušić – PFC Sochi, FC Zenit Saint Petersburg – 2022–2026
- Suad Fileković – FC Krylia Sovetov Samara – 2006–2007
- Goran Gutalj – PFC CSKA Moscow – 1999
- Denis Halilović – FC Saturn Moscow Oblast – 2009–2010
- Branko Ilić – FC Moscow, FC Lokomotiv Moscow – 2009–2011
- Dragan Jelić – FC Krylia Sovetov Samara – 2010
- Bojan Jokić – FC Ufa – 2017–2022
- Amir Karić – FC Moscow – 2004
- Sven Karič – FC Pari Nizhny Novgorod – 2024–2026
- Miha Kline – FC Shinnik Yaroslavl – 2006
- **Martin Kramarič** – PFC Sochi, PFC Krylia Sovetov Samara – 2023–2026
- **Mitja Križan** – FC Rodina Moscow – 2026
- Igor Lazič – FC Terek Grozny – 2005
- Žan Majer – FC Rostov – 2017–2018
- Darijan Matić – FC Shinnik Yaroslavl, PFC Spartak Nalchik – 2006–2007
- Miha Mevlja – FC Rostov, FC Zenit St. Petersburg, PFC Sochi, FC Spartak Moscow – 2016–2022
- Nejc Pečnik – FC Krylia Sovetov Samara – 2011
- Jalen Pokorn – FC Terek Grozny – 2005
- Denis Popović – FC Orenburg, FC Krylia Sovetov Samara – 2017–2020
- Aleksandar Radosavljević – FC Shinnik Yaroslavl, FC Tom Tomsk – 2002, 2004–2009
- Dejan Rusič – PFC Spartak Nalchik – 2010
- Miral Samardžić – FC Anzhi Makhachkala, FC Krylia Sovetov Samara – 2017–2019
- Žiga Škoflek – FC Orenburg – 2019–2020
- Dalibor Stevanović – FC Torpedo Moscow, FC Mordovia Saransk – 2014–2016
- Dušan Stojinović – FC Khimki – 2021
- Luka Vešner Tičić – FC Pari Nizhny Novgorod – 2024–2026
- Dalibor Volaš – FC Mordovia Saransk – 2012–2013
- Andrés Vombergar – FC Ufa – 2019–2020
- Luka Žinko – FC Amkar Perm – 2010

== South Africa ==
- Matthew Booth – FC Rostov, FC Krylia Sovetov Samara – 2002–2008
- Thabo Cele – FC Fakel Voronezh – 2023–2024
- Tony Coyle – FC Rostov – 2003–2005
- Stanton Fredericks – FC Moscow – 2004–2005
- Rowan Hendricks – FC Rostov – 2003–2005
- Jacob Lekgetho – FC Lokomotiv Moscow – 2001–2004
- Bennett Mnguni – FC Lokomotiv Moscow, FC Rostov – 2002–2005
- Dillon Sheppard – FC Dynamo Moscow – 2004
- MacBeth Sibaya – FC Rubin Kazan – 2003–2010
- Siyanda Xulu – FC Rostov – 2012–2014
- Japhet Zwane – FC Rostov – 2003–2005

== South Korea ==
- Hwang In-beom – FC Rubin Kazan – 2020–2021
- Hyun Young-min – FC Zenit St. Petersburg – 2006
- Kim Dong-hyun – FC Rubin Kazan – 2006
- Kim Dong-jin – FC Zenit St. Petersburg – 2006–2009
- Kim In-sung – PFC CSKA Moscow – 2012
- Kim Nam-il – FC Tom Tomsk – 2010–2011
- Denis Laktionov – FC Tom Tomsk – 2011
- Lee Ho – FC Zenit St. Petersburg – 2006
- Oh Beom-seok – FC Krylia Sovetov Samara – 2008–2009
- Yoo Byung-soo – FC Rostov – 2013–2015

== Spain ==
- Víctor Álvarez – FC Arsenal Tula – 2017–2020
- Catanha – FC Krylia Sovetov Samara – 2004
- Chico – FC Rubin Kazan – 2018
- Álex Corredera – FC Khimki – 2024–2025
- Marc Crosas – FC Volga Nizhny Novgorod – 2011
- Ángel Dealbert – FC Kuban Krasnodar – 2012–2014
- **Dani Fernández** – FC Khimki, PFC Krylia Sovetov Samara – 2024–2026
- Javi García – FC Zenit St. Petersburg – 2014–2017
- Jordi – FC Rubin Kazan – 2010
- José Manuel Jurado – FC Spartak Moscow – 2012–2015
- Iván Marcano – FC Rubin Kazan – 2012–2013
- César Navas – FC Rubin Kazan, FC Rostov – 2009–2018
- Pablo Orbaiz – FC Rubin Kazan – 2012–2013
- **Víctor Parada** – FC Spartak Moscow – 2026
- **Iker Pozo** – FC Rodina Moscow – 2026
- Rubén Rochina – FC Rubin Kazan – 2016–2017
- Rodri – FC Spartak Moscow – 2011–2012
- Samu – FC Rubin Kazan – 2016
- Sergio Sánchez – FC Rubin Kazan – 2016–2017
- Antonio Soldevilla – FC Amkar Perm – 2007
- Jonatan Valle – FC Rubin Kazan – 2012
- Alberto Zapater – FC Lokomotiv Moscow – 2011–2013

== Suriname ==
- Myenty Abena – FC Spartak Moscow – 2024–2025
- Mitchell Donald – FC Mordovia Saransk – 2014–2015
- Gyrano Kerk – FC Lokomotiv Moscow – 2021–2022

== Sweden ==
- Pontus Almqvist – FC Rostov – 2020–2022
- Marcus Berg – FC Krasnodar – 2019–2021
- Emil Bergström – FC Rubin Kazan – 2016
- Axel Björnström – FC Arsenal Tula – 2021
- Viktor Claesson – FC Krasnodar – 2017–2021
- Filip Dagerstål – FC Khimki – 2021–2022
- Rasmus Elm – PFC CSKA Moscow – 2012–2014
- Pyotr Gitselov – FC Rubin Kazan, FC Rostov – 2007–2009
- Andreas Granqvist – FC Krasnodar – 2013–2018
- Oscar Hiljemark – FC Dynamo Moscow – 2019–2020
- Sebastian Holmén – FC Dynamo Moscow – 2016–2019
- Kim Källström – FC Spartak Moscow – 2012–2015
- Jordan Larsson – FC Spartak Moscow – 2019–2022
- Kristoffer Olsson – FC Krasnodar – 2019–2021
- Filip Rogić – FC Orenburg – 2019–2020
- Besard Šabović – FC Khimki – 2021–2022
- Anton Salétros – FC Rostov – 2018
- Carl Starfelt – FC Rubin Kazan – 2020–2021
- Carlos Strandberg – PFC CSKA Moscow, FC Ural Yekaterinburg – 2015–2016
- Jonas Wallerstedt – FC Torpedo-Metallurg Moscow – 2003
- Pontus Wernbloom – PFC CSKA Moscow – 2012–2018

== Switzerland ==
- Kemal Ademi – FC Khimki – 2021–2022
- Marco Aratore – FC Ural Yekaterinburg – 2018–2020
- Eldin Jakupović – FC Lokomotiv Moscow – 2006–2007
- Darko Jevtić – FC Rubin Kazan – 2020–2021, 2024
- Vero Salatić – FC Ufa – 2017–2019
- Reto Ziegler – FC Lokomotiv Moscow – 2012
- Steven Zuber – PFC CSKA Moscow – 2013–2014

== Syria ==
- Nihad Al Boushi – FC Krylia Sovetov Samara – 1996–1997
- Assaf Khalifa – FC Zhemchuzhina Sochi – 1994, 1998
- Anas Makhlouf – FC Krylia Sovetov Samara, FC Shinnik Yaroslavl – 1996–1999

== Tajikistan ==
- Aliyor Ashurmamadov – FC Lokomotiv Moscow – 1993
- Arsen Avakov – FC Torpedo Moscow, FC Shinnik Yaroslavl, FC Lokomotiv Nizhny Novgorod, FC Uralan Elista – 1996–2000, 2002
- Yuri Baturenko – FC Lokomotiv Moscow, FC Tyumen – 1992–1995, 1997
- Igor Cherevchenko – FC Lokomotiv Moscow, FC Torpedo Moscow, FC Alania Vladikavkaz – 1996–2002
- Alisher Dzhalilov – FC Rubin Kazan – 2011–2013, 2016
- Khakim Fuzaylov – FC Lokomotiv Moscow – 1992–1994
- Rakhmatullo Fuzaylov – FC Shinnik Yaroslavl, FC Alania Vladikavkaz – 2002–2005
- Nail Galimov – FC Luch Vladivostok – 1993
- Valeriy Gorbach – FC Fakel Voronezh – 1992
- Rustam Khaidaraliyev – FC Lokomotiv Nizhny Novgorod – 1996
- Andrei Manannikov – FC Zenit St. Petersburg, FC Rotor Volgograd – 1992–1993
- Vazgen Manasyan – FC Zenit St. Petersburg – 1992
- Vitaliy Parakhnevych – FC Lokomotiv Moscow – 1995
- Vasili Postnov – FC Lokomotiv Moscow – 1992
- Alimzhon Rafikov – FC Zenit St. Petersburg, FC KAMAZ Naberezhnye Chelny – 1992–1995
- Rashid Rakhimov – FC Spartak Moscow, FC Lokomotiv Moscow – 1992–1994
- Oleg Shirinbekov – FC Torpedo Moscow – 1994–1995
- Georgi Takhokhov – FC Spartak Vladikavkaz – 1992
- Farkhod Vasiyev – FC Saturn Moscow Oblast, FC Krylia Sovetov Samara, FC Orenburg, FC Tambov – 2009–2010, 2016, 2021
- Anatoli Volovodenko – FC Uralmash Yekaterinburg – 1992–1994
- **Rustam Yatimov** – FC Rostov – 2024–2026

== Togo ==
- Arafat Djako – FC Anzhi Makhachkala – 2011
- Abdoul-Gafar Mamah – FC Alania Vladikavkaz – 2010

== Trinidad and Tobago ==
- Sheldon Bateau – FC Krylia Sovetov Samara – 2015–2017
- Levi García – FC Spartak Moscow – 2025–2026

== Tunisia ==
- Selim Benachour – FC Rubin Kazan – 2006–2007
- Anis Boussaïdi – FC Rostov – 2011
- Nader Ghandri – FC Akhmat Grozny – 2024–2025
- Hazem Mastouri – FC Dynamo Makhachkala – 2025–2026
- Montassar Talbi – FC Rubin Kazan – 2021–2022
- Chaker Zouaghi – FC Lokomotiv Moscow – 2006–2007

== Turkey ==
- Mehmet Aksu – FC Rostov – 2003
- Caner Erkin – PFC CSKA Moscow – 2007–2009
- Emircan Gürlük – FC Orenburg – 2023–2026
- Hasan Kabze – FC Rubin Kazan – 2007–2010
- Gökdeniz Karadeniz – FC Rubin Kazan – 2008–2018
- Kazımcan Karataş – FC Orenburg – 2024–2025
- Fatih Tekke – FC Zenit St. Petersburg, FC Rubin Kazan – 2006–2010
- Gökhan Töre – FC Rubin Kazan – 2012–2013
- Tamer Tuna – FC Terek Grozny – 2005
- Yusuf Yazıcı – PFC CSKA Moscow – 2022

== Turkmenistan ==
- Denis Titow – FC Rostov – 2025
- Wladimir Baýramow – FC Rubin Kazan, FC Khimki – 2003–2008
- Valeri Broshin – PFC CSKA Moscow – 1993–1994
- Pavel Harçik – FC Rubin Kazan – 2003, 2005–2007
- Maksim Kazankov – FC SKA-Khabarovsk – 2017–2018
- Dmitri Khomukha – FC Zenit St. Petersburg, PFC CSKA Moscow, FC Shinnik Yaroslavl, FC Terek Grozny – 1996–2000, 2002–2003, 2005
- Vladimir Kostyuk – FC Dynamo Moscow – 1992–1993
- Andrei Martynov – FC Torpedo Moscow, FC Shinnik Yaroslavl – 1992, 1997
- Çaryýar Muhadow – FC Lada Togliatti – 1996
- Dmitriý Neželew – FC Uralmash Yekaterinburg, FC Zenit St. Petersburg – 1992–1994, 1996
- Denis Peremenin – FC Anzhi Makhachkala – 2000–2002
- Wahyt Orazsähedow – FC Rubin Kazan, FC Rostov – 2011
- Andrei Zavyalov – FC KamAZ-Chally Naberezhnye Chelny – 1995

== Ukraine ==
- Andrey Aleksanenkov – FC KamAZ-Chally Naberezhnye Chelny – 1995–1996
- Akhmed Alibekov – FC Ufa – 2020
- Oleksandr Aliyev – FC Lokomotiv Moscow, FC Anzhi Makhachkala – 2010, 2014
- Vadym Alpatov – FC Lokomotiv Nizhny Novgorod – 2000
- Oleksiy Antyukhin – FC Chernomorets Novorossiysk – 2003
- Andriy Anishchenko – FC Krylia Sovetov Samara – 1995–1996
- Oleksandr Babiy – FC Zenit St. Petersburg – 1998–1999
- Oleksandr Babych – FC Anzhi Makhachkala – 2002
- Aleksei Bakharev – FC Lada Togliatti, FC Spartak Moscow, FC Rotor Volgograd – 1994, 1996–1998
- Vitaliy Balashov – FC Tambov – 2020
- Vitaliy Balytskyi – FC Alania Vladikavkaz – 2002
- Serhiy Bezhenar – FC Chernomorets Novorossiysk – 2001
- Anatoliy Bezsmertnyi – FC Tyumen, FC Rostselmash Rostov-on-Don – 1994–1995, 1997–2001
- Maksym Biletskyi – PFC CSKA Moscow, FC Moscow, FC Rostov – 2000–2006
- Dmytro Bilonoh – FC Ural Yekaterinburg – 2015
- Illya Blyznyuk – FC Rostov, FC Spartak-Alania Vladikavkaz, FC Tom Tomsk, FC Shinnik Yaroslavl – 2000–2007
- Serhiy Borysenko – FC Alania Vladikavkaz – 2000
- Serhiy Boyko – FC Terek Grozny – 2005
- Viktor Brovchenko – FC Lokomotiv Nizhny Novgorod – 2000
- Pylyp Budkivskyi – FC Anzhi Makhachkala – 2016–2018
- Bohdan Butko – FC Amkar Perm – 2015–2016
- Ihor Chaykovskyi – FC Anzhi Makhachkala – 2017–2018
- Oleh Danchenko – FC Anzhi Makhachkala, FC Yenisey Krasnoyarsk, FC Rubin Kazan, FC Ufa – 2017–2020
- Serhiy Datsenko – FC Rostov, FC Terek Grozny – 2000–2005
- Denys Dedechko – FC Amkar Perm, FC SKA-Khabarovsk – 2010, 2017
- Marko Dević – FC Rubin Kazan, FC Rostov – 2014–2017
- Anatoliy Didenko – FC Amkar Perm – 2004–2005
- Serhiy Dmytriyev – FC Anzhi Makhachkala – 2001–2002
- Yuriy Dmytrulin – FC Shinnik Yaroslavl – 2006
- Serhiy Doronchenko – FC Lada Togliatti – 1994
- Yevhen Drahunov – FC Lada Togliatti – 1994
- Ihor Dudnyk – FC Terek Grozny – 2008
- Yuriy Dudnyk – PFC CSKA Moscow, FC Rostselmash Rostov-on-Don – 1993, 1997–1998
- Vladislav Duyun – FC Spartak Moscow, FC Lokomotiv Nizhny Novgorod, FC Rostselmash Rostov-on-Don, FC Sokol Saratov – 1996–2002
- Andriy Dykan – FC Terek Grozny, FC Spartak Moscow, FC Krasnodar – 2009–2015
- Kostyantyn Dymarchuk – FC Zenit St. Petersburg, FC Tyumen, FC Zhemchuzhina Sochi – 1997–1999
- Vitaliy Fedoriv – FC Amkar Perm – 2008–2011
- Vitaliy Fedotov – FC SKA-Khabarovsk – 2017–2018
- Dmitry Gorbushin – FC Kuban Krasnodar – 2009
- Volodymyr Hapon – FC Uralan Elista – 2003
- Oleh Haras – FC Lokomotiv Moscow, FC Fakel Voronezh – 1996, 1998, 2000–2001
- Serhiy Harashchenkov – FC Amkar Perm – 2012
- Volodymyr Herashchenko – FC Rotor Volgograd – 1992–1998
- Oleksiy Hetman – FC Rostselmash Rostov-on-Don – 2001
- Ivan Hetsko – FC Lokomotiv Nizhny Novgorod, FC Alania Vladikavkaz – 1995–1997
- Yaroslav Hodzyur – FC Terek Grozny, FC Ural Yekaterinburg – 2008, 2010–2021
- Dmytro Horbatenko – FC KamAZ Naberezhnye Chelny – 1994–1995
- Valeriy Horodov – FC Uralmash Yekaterinburg, FC Fakel Voronezh – 1994–1995, 1997
- Oleksandr Horshkov – FC Zhemchuzhina Sochi, FC Zenit St. Petersburg, FC Saturn-RenTV Ramenskoye – 1996–2007
- Oleksandr Hranovskyi – FC Spartak Moscow – 2001
- Yuriy Hritsyna – FC Dynamo-Gazovik Tyumen – 1994–1995
- Artem Hromov – FC Krylia Sovetov Samara – 2017
- Dmytro Hryshko – FC SKA-Khabarovsk – 2017–2018
- Yuriy Hulyayev – FC Lokomotiv Nizhny Novgorod – 1992, 1993
- Yuriy Hudymenko – FC Dynamo Moscow, FC Lada Togliatti – 1993–1994
- Oleksandr Humenyuk – FC Chernomorets Novorossiysk – 1998
- Andriy Husin – FC Krylia Sovetov Samara, FC Saturn Ramenskoye – 2005–2006, 2008
- Andriy Huzenko – FC Krylia Sovetov Samara – 1998
- Dmytro Ivanisenya – PFC Krylia Sovetov Samara – 2021–2025 (received Russian citizenship in 2024)
- Yuriy Kalitvintsev – FC Dynamo Moscow, FC Lokomotiv Nizhny Novgorod – 1992–1994
- Maksym Kalynychenko – FC Spartak Moscow – 2000–2008
- Oleksandr Kapliyenko – FC Tambov – 2020
- Oleh Kastornyi – FC Baltika Kaliningrad, FC Fakel Voronezh – 1998, 2000–2001
- Oleksandr Kasyan – FC Tom Tomsk – 2016
- Oleksiy Khramtsov – FC Uralan Elista – 2000
- Vyacheslav Khruslov – FC Dynamo-Gazovik Tyumen – 1994–1995
- Ihor Khudobyak – FC Rostov – 2013–2014
- Sergei Kormiltsev – FC Uralan Elista, FC Torpedo Moscow – 1998, 2000–2006
- Ihor Korniyets – FC Rotor Volgograd – 1995–1997
- Ihor Korol – FC Baltika Kaliningrad – 1998
- Oleh Koshelyuk – FC Torpedo-Luzhniki Moscow – 1997
- Ihor Kostyuk – FC Tyumen – 1997
- Pavlo Kotovenko – FC Rotor Volgograd – 2001–2004
- Oleksandr Koval – FC Sokol Saratov – 2001
- Kyrylo Kovalchuk – FC Tom Tomsk – 2009–2011, 2016
- Serhiy Krukovets – FC Torpedo Moscow, FC Lokomotiv Nizhny Novgorod – 1996–2000
- Denys Kulakov – FC Ural Yekaterinburg – 2015–2024
- Kostyantyn Kulyk – FC Rotor Volgograd – 1995
- Ihor Kutyepov – FC Dynamo-Gazovik Tyumen, PFC CSKA Moscow, FC Rostselmash Rostov-on-Don – 1994–1995, 1997–2000
- Serhiy Kuznetsov – FC KamAZ Naberezhnye Chelny – 1994
- Serhiy Kuznetsov – FC Alania Vladikavkaz – 2010
- Oleh Kyrylov – FC Asmaral Moscow – 1993
- Oleksandr Kyryukhin – FC Krylia Sovetov Samara, FC Chernomorets Novorossiysk – 2000–2001
- Ihor Lahoyda – FC Uralan Elista – 1999
- Oleksandr Lavrentsov – FC Krylia Sovetov Samara, FC Torpedo-Metallurg Moscow – 2000–2003
- Viktor Leonenko – FC Dynamo Moscow – 1992
- Yevhen Levchenko – FC Saturn Moscow Oblast – 2009
- Maksym Levytskyi – FC Chernomorets Novorossiysk, FC Spartak Moscow, FC Dynamo Moscow – 1999–2005
- Volodymyr Lobas – FC Zhemchuzhina Sochi, FC Energiya-Tekstilshchik Kamyshin – 1996
- Andriy Lopushynskyi – FC Fakel Voronezh – 1997
- Yehor Luhachov – FC Spartak Moscow – 2008
- Taras Lutsenko – FC Uralan Elista – 1999–2000
- Yevhen Lutsenko – FC Dynamo Moscow, FC Shinnik Yaroslavl – 2003–2004
- Yevhen Lysytsyn – FC Spartak Moscow – 2001
- Yuriy Maksymov – FC Rostov – 2003
- Roman Maksymyuk – FC Zenit St. Petersburg – 1998–1999
- Aleksandr Malygin – FC Rostselmash Rostov-on-Don – 2000–2002
- Mark Mampassi – FC Lokomotiv Moscow – 2022
- Oleksandr Martsun – FC Baltika Kaliningrad – 1998
- Volodymyr Matsyhura – FC Rostselmash Rostov-on-Don – 1996–2000
- Vasyl Mazur – FC Krylia Sovetov Samara, FC Lokomotiv Nizhny Novgorod – 1996–1998, 2000
- Roman Meleshko – FC Spartak Vladikavkaz – 1993
- Ilya Mikhalyov – FC Amkar Perm – 2011
- Oleh Mishchenko – FC Amkar Perm – 2016
- Oleksandr Mitrofanov – FC Anzhi Makhachkala – 2002
- Oleh Mochulyak – FC Uralmash Yekaterinburg – 1996
- Ihor Moiseyev – FC Asmaral Moscow – 1993
- Yuriy Mokrytskyi – FC Zhemchuzhina Sochi – 1997
- Anton Monakhov – FC Uralan Elista – 2002–2003
- Roman Monaryov – FC Alania Vladikavkaz, PFC CSKA Moscow, FC Torpedo-Metallurg Moscow, FC Luch-Energiya Vladivostok, FC Shinnik Yaroslavl – 1998, 2001–2003, 2006, 2008
- Yuriy Moroz – FC Alania Vladikavkaz, FC Torpedo-ZIL Moscow – 1997–1998, 2001
- Ruslan Mostovyi – PFC Spartak Nalchik, FC Tom Tomsk – 2006–2007
- Asan Mustafayev – FC Uralmash Yekaterinburg – 1995
- Taras Mykhalyk – FC Lokomotiv Moscow – 2013–2018
- Volodymyr Mykytyn – FC Rostov – 2001–2003
- Oleh Naduda – FC Spartak Moscow – 1994
- Serhiy Nahornyak – FC Spartak Moscow – 1995–1996
- Oleksandr Nefyodov – FC Uralmash Yekaterinburg – 1995
- Oleksandr Nikiforov – FC KamAZ Naberezhnye Chelny – 1993–1994
- Denys Onyshchenko – FC Tom Tomsk – 2006
- Viktor Oparenyuk – FC Zhemchuzhina Sochi – 1995
- Anatoliy Oprya – FC Zhemchuzhina Sochi – 1999
- Hennadiy Orbu – FC Rotor Volgograd, FC Sokol Saratov – 1996, 2001–2002
- Ivan Ordets – FC Dynamo Moscow – 2019–2021
- Oleksiy Osipov – FC Krylia Sovetov Samara, FC Chernomorets Novorossiysk – 2000–2001
- Oleh Ostapenko – FC Fakel Voronezh – 2001
- Dmytro Parfenov – FC Spartak Moscow, FC Dynamo Moscow, FC Khimki, FC Saturn Moscow Oblast – 1998–2007, 2009–2010
- Oleh Patyak – PFC Spartak Nalchik – 2008
- Hennadiy Perepadenko – FC Spartak Moscow – 1992
- Serhiy Perepadenko – FC Lokomotiv Moscow – 1994–1995
- Serhiy Perkhun – PFC CSKA Moscow – 2001
- Oleh Pestryakov – PFC CSKA Moscow, FC Rostselmash Rostov-on-Don, FC Spartak Moscow – 1996–1999, 2003
- Eduard Piskun – FC KamAZ Naberezhnye Chelny – 1994
- Serhiy Pohodin – FC Spartak Moscow – 1993–1994
- Artem Polyarus – FC Khimki, FC Akhmat Grozny – 2020–2021
- Oleksandr Pomazun – FC Spartak Moscow, FC Baltika Kaliningrad, FC Torpedo-ZIL Moscow, FC Saturn-RenTV Ramenskoye – 1993, 1996–1998, 2001–2002
- Vitaliy Ponomarenko – FC Dynamo-Gazovik Tyumen – 1995
- Serhiy Popov – FC Zenit St. Petersburg – 1996–1997
- Hennadiy Popovych – FC Zenit St. Petersburg – 1997–2001
- Andriy Poroshyn – PFC Spartak Nalchik – 2006
- Oleksiy Prokhorenkov – FC Dynamo Moscow – 1998
- Volodymyr Pryyomov – FC Krylia Sovetov Samara – 2011–2012
- Andriy Proshyn – FC Tom Tomsk, FC Rostov – 2006–2007, 2010–2011
- Vyacheslav Protsenko – FC Zhemchuzhina Sochi – 1993–1995
- Vladyslav Prudius – FC Rostselmash Rostov-on-Don, FC Anzhi Makhachkala – 1996–2002
- Oleksandr Pryzetko – FC Tyumen, FC Torpedo Moscow, FC Chernomorets Novorossiysk – 1995, 1997–1998, 2000–2001, 2003
- Serhiy Puchkov – FC KamAZ Naberezhnye Chelny – 1994
- Vitaliy Pushkutsa – FC Chernomorets Novorossiysk – 2000–2001
- Andriy Pylyavskyi – FC Rubin Kazan – 2016
- Serhiy Pylypchuk – PFC Spartak Nalchik, FC Khimki – 2006–2009, 2011
- Yaroslav Rakitskyi – FC Zenit Saint Petersburg – 2019–2021
- Serhii Rebrov – FC Rubin Kazan – 2008–2009
- Oleksandr Rolevych – FC Baltika Kaliningrad – 1996
- Vitaliy Rozghon – FC Krylia Sovetov Samara – 1999
- Petro Rusak – FC Chernomorets Novorossiysk – 1996–1997
- Roman Rusanovskyi – FC Chernomorets Novorossiysk – 1996–1998
- Oleh Rypan – FC Rostselmash Rostov-on-Don – 1996–1997
- Yuriy Sak – FC Spartak Moscow, FC Krylia Sovetov Samara – 1994, 1999
- Viktor Sakhno – FC KamAZ Naberezhnye Chelny – 1993
- Vitaliy Samoylov – FC Sokol Saratov, FC Rotor Volgograd – 2001–2002, 2004
- Oleh Samsonenko – FC Uralmash Yekaterinburg – 1992–1993
- Andriy Sapuha – FC Torpedo Moscow, FC Lokomotiv Nizhny Novgorod – 1998–2000
- Volodymyr Savchenko – FC Rostov, FC Terek Grozny – 1997–2003, 2005
- Serhiy Seleznyov – FC Torpedo-ZIL Moscow – 2001
- Yevhen Seleznyov – FC Kuban Krasnodar – 2016
- Yuriy Seleznyov – FC Rostselmash Rostov-on-Don – 2000–2001
- Dmytro Semochko – FC Uralan Elista, FC Luch-Energiya Vladivostok, FC Shinnik Yaroslavl, FC Khimki – 2000, 2002–2003, 2006–2009
- Serhiy Serebrennikov – FC Shinnik Yaroslavl – 1998
- Oleksandr Sevidov – FC Torpedo Moscow – 1993
- Dmytro Shcherbak – FC Anzhi Makhachkala – 2016
- Bohdan Shershun – PFC CSKA Moscow – 2002–2005
- Vyacheslav Shevchenko – FC Torpedo-Metallurg Moscow – 2003
- Vyacheslav Shevchuk – FC Shinnik Yaroslavl – 2002–2004
- Pavlo Shkapenko – FC Uralan Elista, FC Torpedo Moscow – 1999–2001
- Serhiy Shmatovalenko – FC Krylia Sovetov Samara – 1999
- Serhiy Shubin – FC Zhemchuzhina Sochi – 1996–1997
- Ihor Shukhovtsev – FC Uralmash Yekaterinburg – 1996
- Vitaliy Shumeyko – PFC Spartak Nalchik – 2007–2008
- Oleksandr Shutov – FC Rostselmash Rostov-on-Don, PFC CSKA Moscow, FC Chernomorets Novorossiysk, FC Amkar Perm – 1995–1999, 2004–2005
- Anton Shynder – FC Amkar Perm – 2016–2017
- Serhiy Shyshchenko – FC Baltika Kaliningrad – 1998
- Andriy Sidelnikov – PFC CSKA Moscow – 1997
- Serhiy Skachenko – FC Torpedo Moscow – 1992–1993, 1998–1999
- Denys Skepskyi – FC Dynamo Moscow – 2006, 2009
- Vitaliy Skysh – FC Alania Vladikavkaz – 1996
- Miro Slavov – FC Anzhi Makhachkala – 2011
- Valentyn Slyusar – FC Rostselmash Rostov-on-Don – 1999
- Serhiy Snytko – FC Shinnik Yaroslavl, FC Chernomorets Novorossiysk, FC Kuban Krasnodar – 1997–2001, 2003–2004
- Oleg Solovyov – FC Lada Togliatti, FC Tekstilshchik Kamyshin, FC Chernomorets Novorossiysk, FC Saturn Ramenskoye, FC Uralan Elista – 1994–1997, 1999–2000, 2002
- Yevhen Sonin – FC Krylia Sovetov Samara – 1994–1995
- Oleksandr Spivak – FC Zenit St. Petersburg – 2000–2006
- Mykhaylo Starostyak – FC Shinnik Yaroslavl – 2004–2005
- Pavlo Stepanets – FC Mordovia Saransk, FC Ufa – 2012–2015
- Oleksandr Stepanov – FC Spartak-Alania Vladikavkaz – 2003
- Vasyl Storchak – FC Asmaral Moscow – 1992–1993
- Serhiy Surelo – FC Dynamo-Gazovik Tyumen – 1992
- Hennadiy Sushko – FC Zhemchuzhina Sochi – 1998
- Vyacheslav Sviderskyi – FC Alania Vladikavkaz, FC Dynamo Moscow, FC Saturn Ramenskoye – 2002–2005
- Oleksandr Svystunov – FC Zenit St. Petersburg, FC Chernomorets Novorossiysk – 1997, 2000–2001
- Serhiy Symonenko – FC Torpedo Moscow, FC Alania Vladikavkaz – 1999, 2001–2002
- Oleh Tereshchenko – FC Tekstilshchik Kamyshin, FC Uralan Elista, FC Sokol Saratov, FC Fakel Voronezh – 1993, 1998–2001
- Maksim Tishchenko – FC Rotor Volgograd – 1996–2000
- Maksym Trusevych – FC Rostov – 2007
- Mykola Tsygan – FC Alania Vladikavkaz, FC Krylia Sovetov Samara – 2005, 2010
- Eduard Tsykhmeystruk – FC Spartak Moscow – 2001–2002
- Dmytro Tutychenko – FC Uralan Elista – 1999–2000
- Dmytro Tyapushkin – FC Spartak Moscow, PFC CSKA Moscow, FC Dynamo Moscow – 1994–1998
- Anatoliy Tymoshchuk – FC Zenit St. Petersburg – 2007–2009, 2013–2015
- Vladyslav Vashchuk – FC Spartak Moscow – 2003
- Andriy Vasylytchuk – FC Zhemchuzhina Sochi, FC Energiya-Tekstilshchik Kamyshin – 1996
- Yuriy Vernydub – FC Zenit St. Petersburg – 1997–1999
- Kostyantyn Vizyonok – FC Baltika Kaliningrad – 1998
- Oleh Volotyok – FC Asmaral Moscow – 1993
- Valeriy Vorobyov – FC Torpedo Moscow – 1997–2003
- Andriy Voronin – FC Dynamo Moscow – 2010–2014
- Viktor Yablonskyi – FC Baltika Kaliningrad – 1996–1998
- Dmytro Yakovenko – PFC CSKA Moscow – 1997
- Serhiy Yakovenko – FC Zhemchuzhina Sochi, FC Fakel Voronezh – 1993, 2000
- Ivan Yaremchuk – FC KamAZ Naberezhnye Chelny, FC Energiya-Tekstilshchik Kamyshin – 1994, 1996
- Serhiy Yarmolych – FC Chernomorets Novorossiysk – 1995
- Kostyantyn Yaroshenko – FC Ural Yekaterinburg – 2014–2016
- Artem Yashkin – FC Shinnik Yaroslavl, FC Uralan Elista – 1992, 1998, 2002
- Yuriy Yaskov – FC Zenit St. Petersburg – 2000
- Bohdan Yesyp – FC Rostselmash Rostov-on-Don – 1999
- Vasyl Yevseyev – FC Tekstilshchik Kamyshin – 1993
- Andriy Yudin – FC Tekstilshchik Kamyshin, FC Fakel Voronezh – 1993–1994, 1997
- Vyacheslav Zapoyaska – FC Sokol Saratov – 2002
- Artem Zasyadvovk – FC Shinnik Yaroslavl – 2005–2006
- Volodymyr Zayarnyi – FC KamAZ-Chally Naberezhnye Chelny, FC Chernomorets Novorossiysk – 1996–1997, 1999–2001
- Serhiy Zayets – FC Uralmash Yekaterinburg – 1994–1995
- Ihor Zhabchenko – FC Rotor Volgograd – 1996
- Ihor Zhurakhovskyi – FC Kuban Krasnodar – 2016
- Hennadiy Zhylkin – FC Chernomorets Novorossiysk – 1995
- Oleksandr Zinchenko – FC Ufa – 2015–2016
- Vladyslav Zubkov – FC KamAZ Naberezhnye Chelny, FC Lokomotiv Nizhny Novgorod – 1993–1997

== United States ==
- Eugene Starikov – FC Zenit St. Petersburg, FC Tom Tomsk, FC Rostov – 2010–2013

== Uruguay ==
- Luis Aguiar – FC Dynamo Moscow – 2009
- **Kevin Arévalo** – FC Akron Tolyatti – 2026
- Adrián Balboa – FC Pari Nizhny Novgorod – 2026
- **Juan Manuel Boselli** – FC Pari Nizhny Novgorod, FC Krasnodar – 2023–2026
- Gonzalo Bueno – FC Kuban Krasnodar – 2013
- Guillermo Cotugno – FC Rubin Kazan – 2015–2016
- Javier Delgado – FC Saturn Ramenskoye – 2004–2005
- Giovanni González – FC Krasnodar – 2024–2026
- Carlos Gutiérrez – FC Rostov – 2004–2006
- Abel Hernández – PFC CSKA Moscow – 2018–2019
- Diego Laxalt – FC Dynamo Moscow – 2021–2025
- Mauricio Lemos – FC Rubin Kazan – 2015
- Víctor López – FC Uralan Elista – 2003
- Javier Mancini – FC Rostov – 2005
- **Nicolás Marichal** – FC Dynamo Moscow – 2022–2026
- Sebastián Morquio – FC Uralan Elista – 2003
- **Lucas Olaza** – FC Krasnodar – 2023–2026
- Omar Pérez – FC Rostov – 2004–2006
- Mauricio Pereyra – FC Krasnodar – 2013–2019
- Facundo Píriz – FC Terek Grozny – 2013–2017
- **Maizon Rodríguez** – FC Krasnodar – 2026
- Agustín Rogel – FC Krylia Sovetov Samara – 2018–2019
- Rodrigo Saravia – FC Rostov – 2024
- Andrés Scotti – FC Rubin Kazan – 2003–2006
- Bruno Silva – FC Rostov – 2004
- Marcelo Sosa – FC Spartak Moscow – 2004
- Cristian Tassano – FC Khimki – 2023
- Guillermo Varela – FC Dynamo Moscow – 2020–2022
- Thiago Vecino – FC Pari Nizhny Novgorod – 2025

== Uzbekistan ==
- Rustam Ashurmatov – FC Rubin Kazan – 2023–2025
- Vadim Afonin – FC Orenburg, FC Anzhi Makhachkala – 2016–2019
- Ruslan Agalarov – FC Anzhi Makhachkala – 2000–2002
- Odil Ahmedov – FC Anzhi Makhachkala, FC Krasnodar – 2011–2016
- Andrey Akopyants – FC Rostov – 2000–2005
- Sergey Andreyev – FC Krylia Sovetov Samara – 1998
- Bakhtiyor Ashurmatov – FC Spartak-Alania Vladikavkaz, FC Torpedo-Metallurg Moscow, FC Krylia Sovetov Samara – 2003, 2005
- Ulugbek Bakayev – PFC CSKA Moscow, FC Torpedo-ZIL Moscow – 2001–2002
- Marat Bikmaev – FC Krylia Sovetov Samara, PFC Spartak Nalchik, FC Alania Vladikavkaz – 2005, 2008–2010
- Pavel Bugalo – FC Alania Vladikavkaz – 2000
- Gennadi Denisov – FC Spartak Vladikavkaz – 1992–1994
- Vitaliy Denisov – FC Lokomotiv Moscow, FC Krylia Sovetov Samara, FC Rubin Kazan – 2013–2019
- Khojimat Erkinov – FC Torpedo Moscow – 2022–2023
- Sherzod Esanov – FC Akron Tolyatti – 2024–2025
- Davron Fayziev – PFC CSKA Moscow, FC Alania Vladikavkaz – 2000–2002
- Abbosbek Fayzullaev – PFC CSKA Moscow – 2023–2025
- Andrei Fyodorov – FC Alania Vladikavkaz, FC Rubin Kazan – 1998–1999, 2003–2008
- Vagiz Galiulin – FC Rubin Kazan, FC Sibir Novosibirsk, FC Ufa, FC Tosno – 2008, 2010, 2014–2015, 2017–2018
- Alexander Geynrikh – PFC CSKA Moscow, FC Torpedo Moscow – 2003, 2005–2006
- Jafar Irismetov – FC Chernomorets Novorossiysk, FC Spartak Moscow, FC Anzhi Makhachkala – 1998, 2001–2002
- Victor Karpenko – FC Shinnik Yaroslavl – 2003–2004
- Dostonbek Khamdamov – FC Anzhi Makhachkala – 2018
- Igor Kichigin – FC Fakel Voronezh – 1992
- Leonid Koshelev – FC Shinnik Yaroslavl – 2005–2006
- Yaroslav Krushelnitskiy – FC Rotor Volgograd – 2004
- Sergey Lebedev – FC Shinnik Yaroslavl – 1999
- Sergey Lushan – FC Krylia Sovetov Samara, FC Rostselmash Rostov-on-Don – 1997–2003
- **Makhmud Makhamadzhonov** – FC Dynamo Makhachkala – 2026
- Vladimir Maminov – FC Lokomotiv Moscow – 1993–2008
- Davron Mirzaev – FC Rubin Kazan – 2009
- Eduard Momotov – FC Chernomorets Novorossiysk – 1998–1999
- Bahodir Nasimov – FC Rubin Kazan – 2010
- Aleksey Nikolaev – FC Shinnik Yaroslavl – 2006
- Oleg Pashinin – FC Lokomotiv Moscow – 1993–2007
- Aleksey Polyakov – FC Lokomotiv Moscow, FC Krylia Sovetov Samara, FC Luch-Energiya Vladivostok, FC Tom Tomsk – 1999, 2001–2010
- Mirjalol Qosimov – FC Alania Vladikavkaz, FC Krylia Sovetov Samara – 1992, 1994–1996, 1999–2001, 2003–2004
- Vladimir Radkevich – FC Rotor Volgograd – 2002–2004
- Bakhodyr Rakhmanov – FC Okean Nakhodka – 1993
- Umarali Rakhmonaliev – FC Rubin Kazan – 2023–2024
- Andrey Rezantsev – FC Okean Nakhodka, FC Krylia Sovetov Samara, FC Shinnik Yaroslavl – 1993–1999
- Yevgeni Safonov – FC Shinnik Yaroslavl – 2002–2006
- Aleksandr Sayun – FC Torpedo Moscow, FC Uralan Elista, FC Lokomotiv Nizhny Novgorod – 1998–2000
- Nikolay Shirshov – FC Rostov – 2002–2005
- Igor Shkvyrin – FC Alania Vladikavkaz – 1992
- Eldor Shomurodov – FC Rostov – 2017–2020
- Gennadi Skripnik – FC Dynamo Stavropol – 1992
- Pavel Solomin – FC Saturn Moscow Oblast – 2007
- Sanzhar Tursunov – FC Volga Nizhny Novgorod, FC Alania Vladikavkaz – 2011–2012
- **Jakhongir Urozov** – FC Rubin Kazan – 2026
- Oston Urunov – FC Ufa, FC Spartak Moscow, FC Ural Yekaterinburg – 2020–2022
- Igor Volkov – FC Torpedo Moscow – 1994–1996
- Ibrokhimkhalil Yuldoshev – FC Pari Nizhny Novgorod – 2021–2023

== Venezuela ==
- Wilker Ángel – FC Terek Grozny – 2016–2021
- Jhon Chancellor – FC Anzhi Makhachkala – 2018
- Sergio Córdova – PFC Sochi – 2024
- Saúl Guarirapa – PFC Sochi, PFC CSKA Moscow – 2024–2025
- Leopoldo Jiménez – FC Alania Vladikavkaz – 2005
- Diego Luna – FC Baltika Kaliningrad, FC Khimki – 2024–2025
- Fernando Martínez – FC Uralan Elista – 2003
- Yordan Osorio – FC Zenit St. Petersburg – 2019–2020
- Andrés Ponce – FC Anzhi Makhachkala, FC Akhmat Grozny, FC Rotor Volgograd – 2018–2021
- Salomón Rondón – FC Rubin Kazan, FC Zenit St. Petersburg, PFC CSKA Moscow – 2012–2015, 2021

== Zambia ==
- Lameck Banda – FC Arsenal Tula – 2019–2020
- Gift Kampamba – FC Rostov – 2002–2004
- Evans Kangwa – FC Arsenal Tula – 2017–2022
- Kings Kangwa – FC Arsenal Tula – 2019–2022
- Chisamba Lungu – FC Ural Yekaterinburg – 2013–2017
- Chaswe Nsofwa – FC Krylia Sovetov Samara – 2003
- Stoppila Sunzu – FC Arsenal Tula – 2017–2018

== Zimbabwe ==
- Newton Ben Katanha – PFC Spartak Nalchik – 2006
- Musawengosi Mguni – FC Terek Grozny – 2011

== Notes ==
1. Born in Argentina
2. Born in Austria
3. Born in Azerbaijan (then part of the Soviet Union)
4. Born in Belarus (then part of the Soviet Union)
5. Born in Bosnia and Herzegovina
6. Born in Bosnia and Herzegovina (then part of SFR Yugoslavia)
7. Born in Belgium
8. Born in Brazil
9. Born in Ivory Coast
10. Born in Cameroon
11. Born in Colombia
12. Born in Croatia (then part of SFR Yugoslavia)
13. Born in Czech Republic (then part of the Czechoslovakia)
14. Born in East Germany (now part of Germany)
15. Born in France
16. Born in Georgia (then part of the Soviet Union)
17. Born in Germany
18. Born in Spain
19. Born in Guadeloupe (Overseas department of the French Republic)
20. Born in Guinea-Bissau
21. Born in Greece
22. Born in Kazakhstan
23. Born in Kazakhstan (then part of the Soviet Union)
24. Born in Kosovo
25. Born in Kosovo (then part of SFR Yugoslavia)
26. Born in Kyrgyzstan (then part of the Soviet Union)
27. Born in Montenegro (then part of Serbia and Montenegro)
28. Born in Montenegro (then part of the SFR Yugoslavia)
29. Born in the Netherlands
30. Born in Nigeria
31. Born in Norway
32. Born in Portugal
33. Born in Réunion (Overseas department of the French Republic)
34. Born in Republic of Macedonia (then part of SFR Yugoslavia)
35. Born in Russia
36. Born in Russia (then part of the Soviet Union)
37. Born in São Tomé and Príncipe (Portuguese São Tomé and Príncipe)
38. Born in Scotland
39. Born in Serbia (then part of the SFR Yugoslavia)
40. Born in Serbia (then part of the FR Yugoslavia)
41. Born in São Tomé and Príncipe
42. Born in Slovakia
43. Born in Slovakia (then part of the Czechoslovakia)
44. Born in South Africa
45. Born in Suriname
46. Born in Switzerland
47. Born in Sweden
48. Born in Tajikistan (then part of the Soviet Union)
49. Born in Turkey
50. Born in Turkmenistan (then part of the Soviet Union)
51. Born in Ukraine
52. Born in Ukraine (then part of the Soviet Union)
53. Born in Uzbekistan (then part of the Soviet Union)
54. Born in the USA
55. Born in Venezuela
56. Born in West Germany (now part of Germany)
57. Born in Zambia
58. Capped for the Austria national under-21 football team
59. Capped for the Belgium national football team
60. Capped for the Belgium national under-16 football team
61. Capped for the Belgium national under-17 football team
62. Capped for the Belgium national under-18 football team
63. Capped for the Belgium national under-19 football team
64. Capped for the Belgium national under-21 football team
65. Capped for the Bosnia and Herzegovina national under-21 football team
66. Capped for the Catalonia national football team
67. Capped for the Ivory Coast national football team
68. Capped for the Colombia national under-20 football team
69. Capped for the Croatia national under-16 football team
70. Capped for the Croatia national under-17 football team
71. Capped for the Croatia national under-18 football team
72. Capped for the Croatia national under-19 football team
73. Capped for the Croatia national under-20 football team
74. Capped for the Croatia national under-21 football team
75. Capped for the France national under-17 football team
76. Capped for the France national under-18 football team
77. Capped for the France national under-19 football team
78. Capped for the France national under-20 football team
79. Capped for the France national under-21 football team
80. Capped for the Georgia national under-21 football team
81. Capped for the Germany national under-19 football team
82. Capped for the Germany national under-20 football team
83. Capped for the Guadeloupe national under-20 football team
84. Capped for the Kosovo national football team
85. Capped for the Kosovo national under-16 football team
86. Capped for the Kosovo national under-21 football team
87. Capped for the Luxembourg national under-17 football team
88. Capped for the Luxembourg national under-19 football team
89. Capped for the Netherlands national under-21 football team
90. Capped for the Nigeria national under-20 football team
91. Capped for the Portugal national under-19 football team
92. Capped for the Portugal national under-20 football team
93. Capped for the Portugal national under-21 football team
94. Capped for the Portugal national under-23 football team
95. Capped for the Portugal national football B team
96. Capped for the Russia national football team
97. Capped for the Russia national under-15 football team
98. Capped for the Russia national under-16 football team
99. Capped for the Russia national under-17 football team
100. Capped for the Russia national under-18 football team
101. Capped for the Russia national under-19 football team
102. Capped for the Russia national under-20 football team
103. Capped for the Russia national under-21 football team
104. Capped for the Serbia national under-16 football team
105. Capped for the Serbia national under-18 football team
106. Capped for the Serbia national under-21 football team
107. Capped for the Serbia and Montenegro national under-18 football team
108. Capped for the Serbia and Montenegro national under-21 football team
109. Capped for the Switzerland national under-19 football team
110. Capped for the Switzerland national under-21 football team
111. Capped for the Sweden men's national football team
112. Capped for the Sweden men's national under-17 football team
113. Capped for the Sweden men's national under-19 football team
114. Capped for the Sweden national under-21 football team
115. Capped for the Ukraine national under-17 football team
116. Registered with the league as a citizen of Albania
117. Registered with the league as a citizen of Argentina
118. Registered with the league as a citizen of Austria
119. Registered with the league as a citizen of Belgium
120. Registered with the league as a citizen of Bulgaria
121. Registered with the league as a citizen of the Republic of the Congo
122. Registered with the league as a citizen of Ivory Coast
123. Registered with the league as a citizen of Cameroon
124. Registered with the league as a citizen of Colombia
125. Registered with the league as a citizen of Croatia
126. Registered with the league as a citizen of Spain
127. Registered with the league as a citizen of France
128. Registered with the league as a citizen of Germany
129. Registered with the league as a citizen of the United Kingdom
130. Registered with the league as a citizen of Hungary
131. Registered with the league as a citizen of Italy
132. Registered with the league as a citizen of the Netherlands
133. Registered with the league as a citizen of Nigeria
134. Registered with the league as a citizen of Norway
135. Registered with the league as a citizen of Portugal
136. Registered with the league as a citizen of Russia
137. Registered with the league as a citizen of Serbia and Montenegro
138. Registered with the league as a citizen of Serbia
139. Registered with the league as a citizen of Switzerland
140. Registered with the league as a citizen of Sweden
141. Registered with the league as a citizen of Ukraine
142. Registered with the league as a citizen of the United States
