= 2002 FC Anzhi Makhachkala season =

Anzhi Makhachkala
2002 season
- Chairman: Magomed-Sultan Magomedov
- Manager: Leonid Tkachenko until May; Aleksandr Reshetnyak (caretaker); May–June; Myron Markevych; June–August; Aleksandr Reshetnyak (caretaker); August; Gadzhi Gadzhiyev; From August
- Stadium: Dinamo Stadium
- Premier League: 15th Relegated
- Russian Cup: Progressed to 2003 Season
- Top goalscorer: League: Budun Budunov (4); All: Budun Budunov (6)
| Home colours | Away colours |

The 2002 FC Anzhi Makhachkala season was the 3rd season that the club played in the Russian Top Division, the highest tier of football in Russia, following their promotion from the National Football League in 1999. They finished the season in 15th, and were relegated back to the National Football League for the 2003 Season.

== Squad ==
As of match played 17 November 2002

| No. | Name | Nationality | Position | Date of birth (age) | Signed from | Signed in | Contract ends | Apps. | Goals |
Goalkeepers
| 1 | Sergey Armishev | (Russia) | GK | 29 April 1976 (aged 26) | Uralan Elista | 1999 | | 53 | 0 |
| 16 | Amel Mujčinović | (Bosnia and Herzegovina) | GK | 20 November 1973 (aged 28) | NK Celje | 2002 | | 6 | 0 |
| 55 | Taras Chopik | (Ukraine) | GK | 2 February 1972 (aged 30) | loan from Polihraftekhnika | 2002 | | 0 | 0 |
Defenders
| 5 | Igor Aksyonov | (Russia) | DF | 11 August 1977 (aged 25) | CSKA Moscow | 2002 | | 15 | 1 |
| 6 | Andrei Gordeyev | (Russia) | DF | 1 April 1975 (aged 27) | Dynamo Moscow | 1999 | | 83 | 3 |
| 8 | Kakhaber Mzhavanadze | (Georgia (country)) | DF | 2 October 1978 (aged 24) | Spartak Moscow | 2002 | | 28 | 1 |
| 14 | Arsen Akayev | (Russia) | DF | 28 December 1970 (aged 31) | Dynamo Makhachkala | 1999 | | 92 | 3 |
| 18 | Stevo Glogovac | (Bosnia and Herzegovina) | DF | 9 January 1973 (aged 29) | Red Star Belgrade | 2002 | | 17 | 0 |
| 19 | Nebojša Stojković | (Federal Republic of Yugoslavia) | DF | 2 June 1974 (aged 28) | Pobeda | 2000 | | 77 | 1 |
| 22 | Dženan Hošić | (Bosnia and Herzegovina) | DF | 13 May 1976 (aged 25) | Sarajevo | 2000 | | 40 | 1 |
| 40 | Oleksandr Babych | (Ukraine) | DF | 27 March 1979 (aged 23) | Polihraftekhnika Oleksandriya | 2002 | | 12 | 1 |
| 41 | Nicolae Stanciu | (Romania) | DF | 13 November 1973 (aged 29) | Rapid București | 2002 | | 10 | 0 |
| 42 | Tadas Papečkys | (Lithuania) | DF | 28 September 1978 (aged 24) | loan from FBK Kaunas | 2002 | | 1 | 0 |
Midfielders
| 4 | Vladyslav Prudius | (Ukraine) | MF | 22 June 1973 (aged 29) | Lokomotiv Nizhny Novgorod | 2002 | | 24 | 3 |
| 7 | Ruslan Agalarov | (Uzbekistan) | MF | 21 February 1974 (aged 28) | Lokomotiv-Taym Mineralnye Vody | 1999 | | 312 | 32 |
| 10 | Gadzhi Bamatov | (Russia) | MF | 16 February 1982 (aged 20) | Youth Team | 1997 | | 93 | 17 |
| 12 | Willer | (Brazil) | MF | 18 November 1979 (aged 22) | Independiente | 2002 | | 12 | 1 |
| 13 | Murad Ramazanov | (Russia) | MF | 10 March 1979 (aged 23) | Dynamo Makhachkala | 1999 | | | |
| 21 | Sergei Ivanov | (Kyrgyzstan) | MF | 30 May 1980 (aged 22) | Kairat | 2001 | | 9 | 0 |
| 27 | Aleksei Savelyev | (Russia) | MF | 10 April 1977 (aged 25) | CSKA Moscow | 2002 | | 21 | 3 |
| 44 | Oleksandr Mitrofanov | (Ukraine) | MF | 1 November 1977 (aged 25) | Tavriya Simferopol | 2002 | | 14 | 1 |
| 45 | Amir Hamzić | (Bosnia and Herzegovina) | MF | 5 January 1975 (aged 27) | FC Aarau | 2002 | | 4 | 0 |
| 66 | Emmanuel Osei Kuffour | (Ghana) | MF | 6 April 1976 (aged 26) | Hearts of Oak | 2002 | | 6 | 0 |
Forwards
| 9 | Budun Budunov | (Russia) | FW | 4 December 1975 (aged 26) | Lokomotiv-Taym Mineralnye Vody | 1999 | | | |
| 15 | Valery Alekseyev | (Russia) | FW | 16 February 1979 (aged 23) | Spartak Kostroma | 2000 | | | |
| 30 | Jafar Irismetov | (Uzbekistan) | FW | 23 August 1976 (aged 26) | Spartak Moscow | 2002 | | 11 | 0 |
| 43 | Andrius Velička | (Lithuania) | FW | 5 April 1979 (aged 23) | loan from FBK Kaunas | 2002 | | 6 | 1 |
| 54 | Hadis Zubanović | (Bosnia and Herzegovina) | FW | 14 January 1978 (aged 24) | İstanbulspor | 2002 | | 1 | 0 |
Players who left during the season
| 2 | Denis Peremenin | (Turkmenistan) | MF | 4 January 1976 (aged 26) | Köpetdag Aşgabat | 1999 | | | |
| 20 | Ilya Tsymbalar | (Russia) | MF | 17 June 1969 (aged 33) | Lokomotiv Moscow | 2001 | | 19 | 1 |
| 23 | Serhiy Dmytriyev | (Ukraine) | DF | 3 November 1978 (aged 24) | Metalurh Donetsk | 2001 | | 43 | 0 |
| 25 | Stanislav Khoteyev | (Russia) | GK | 3 July 1981 (aged 21) | Academy | 2002 | | 0 | 0 |
| 31 | Magomed Adiyev | (Russia) | FW | 30 June 1977 (aged 25) | Spartak-d Moscow | 2000 | | | |
| 53 | Ēriks Pelcis | (Latvia) | FW | 25 June 1978 (aged 24) | Anyang LG Cheetahs | 2002 | | 3 | 1 |

=== Left club during season ===
Note: Flags indicate national team as defined under FIFA eligibility rules; some limited exceptions apply. Players may hold more than one non-FIFA nationality.

| No. | Pos. | Nation | Player |
|---|---|---|---|
| 2 | MF | TKM | Denis Peremenin (to Fakel Voronezh) |
| 20 | MF | RUS | Ilya Tsymbalar |
| 23 | DF | UKR | Serhiy Dmytriyev |

| No. | Pos. | Nation | Player |
|---|---|---|---|
| 25 | GK | RUS | Stanislav Khoteyev (to Fakel Voronezh) |
| 31 | FW | RUS | Magomed Adiyev (to Sokol Saratov) |
| 53 | FW | LAT | Ēriks Pelcis |

== Transfers ==
=== In ===
| Date | Position | Nationality | Name | From | Fee | Ref. |
|---|---|---|---|---|---|---|
| Winter 2002 | GK | (Bosnia and Herzegovina) | Amel Mujčinović | NK Celje | Undisclosed | |
| Winter 2002 | DF | (Bosnia and Herzegovina) | Stevo Glogovac | Red Star Belgrade | Undisclosed | |
| Winter 2002 | DF | (Georgia (country)) | Kakhaber Mzhavanadze | Spartak Moscow | Undisclosed | |
| Winter 2002 | DF | (Russia) | Igor Aksyonov | CSKA Moscow | Undisclosed | |
| Winter 2002 | MF | (Brazil) | Willer | Independiente | Undisclosed | |
| Winter 2002 | MF | (Ukraine) | Vladyslav Prudius | Lokomotiv Nizhny Novgorod | Undisclosed | |
| Winter 2002 | FW | (Russia) | Aleksei Savelyev | Saturn-REN TV | Undisclosed | |
| Winter 2002 | FW | (Uzbekistan) | Jafar Irismetov | Spartak Moscow | Undisclosed | |
| Summer 2002 | DF | (Bosnia and Herzegovina) | Amir Hamzić | Aarau | Undisclosed | |
| Summer 2002 | DF | (Romania) | Nicolae Stanciu | Rapid București | Undisclosed | |
| Summer 2002 | DF | (Ukraine) | Oleksandr Babych | Polihraftekhnika | Undisclosed | |
| Summer 2002 | MF | (Kyrgyzstan) | Sergei Ivanov | SKA-PVO Bishkek | Undisclosed | |
| Summer 2002 | MF | (Ukraine) | Oleksandr Mitrofanov | Tavriya Simferopol | Undisclosed | |
| Summer 2002 | FW | (Bosnia and Herzegovina) | Hadis Zubanović | İstanbulspor | Undisclosed | |
| Summer 2002 | FW | (Latvia) | Ēriks Pelcis | | Free | |

=== Loans in ===
| Date from | Position | Nationality | Name | From | Date to | Ref. |
|---|---|---|---|---|---|---|
| Summer 2002 | GK | (Ukraine) | Taras Chopyk | Polihraftekhnika | End of Season | |
| Summer 2002 | DF | (Lithuania) | Tadas Papečkys | FBK Kaunas | End of Season | |
| Summer 2002 | MF | (Ghana) | Emmanuel Osei Kuffour | Hearts of Oak | End of Season | |
| Summer 2002 | FW | (Lithuania) | Andrius Velička | FBK Kaunas | End of Season | |

=== Out ===
| Date | Position | Nationality | Name | To | Fee | Ref. |
|---|---|---|---|---|---|---|
| Winter 2002 | GK | (Azerbaijan) | Aleksandr Zhidkov | Tom Tomsk | Undisclosed | |
| Winter 2002 | DF | (Azerbaijan) | Ilgar Abdurahmanov | Chernomorets Novorossiysk | Undisclosed | |
| Winter 2002 | DF | (Belarus) | Syarhey Yaskovich | Olympique Alès | Undisclosed | |
| Winter 2002 | DF | (Cameroon) | Michel Pensée | Sanfrecce Hiroshima | Undisclosed | |
| Winter 2002 | MF | (Azerbaijan) | Narvik Sırxayev | Lokomotiv Moscow | Undisclosed | |
| Winter 2002 | MF | (Bosnia and Herzegovina) | Zehrudin Kavazović | Budućnost Banovići | Undisclosed | |
| Winter 2002 | MF | (Federal Republic of Yugoslavia) | Goran Jovanović | Győri ETO | Undisclosed | |
| Winter 2002 | MF | (Russia) | Marek Hollý | Volgar Astrakhan | Undisclosed | |
| Winter 2002 | FW | (Russia) | Ishref Magomedov | Torpedo Vladimir | Undisclosed | |
| Winter 2002 | FW | (Russia) | Aleksei Sherstnyov | Torpedo-ZIL Moscow | Undisclosed | |
| Summer 2002 | DF | (Turkmenistan) | Denis Peremenin | Fakel Voronezh | Undisclosed | |
| Summer 2002 | MF | (Russia) | Stanislav Khoteyev | Fakel Voronezh | Undisclosed | |
| Summer 2002 | FW | (Russia) | Magomed Adiyev | Sokol Saratov | Undisclosed | |

=== Released ===
| Date | Position | Nationality | Name | Joined | Date | Ref. |
|---|---|---|---|---|---|---|
| 30 June 2002 | DF | (Ukraine) | Serhiy Dmytriyev | SKA-Energia Khabarovsk | 1 September 2003 | |
| 30 June 2002 | FW | (Latvia) | Ēriks Pelcis | Dinaburg | | |
| 31 December 2002 | MF | (Russia) | Ilya Tsymbalar | Retired | | |

== Competitions ==
=== Overview ===
| Competition | First match | Last match | Starting round | Final position | Record | | | | | | | |
| Competition | First match | Last match | Starting round | Final position | Pld | W | D | L | GF | GA | GD | Win % |
|---|---|---|---|---|---|---|---|---|---|---|---|---|
| Premier League | 9 March 2002 | 17 November 2002 | Matchday 1 | 15th | 30 | 5 | 10 | 15 | 22 | 43 | −21 | 16.67 |
| 2002–03 Russian Cup | 29 June 2002 | see 2003 season | Round of 32 | Round of 32 | 1 | 1 | 0 | 0 | 2 | 1 | +1 | 100.00 |
| Total | | | | | 31 | 6 | 10 | 15 | 24 | 44 | −20 | 19.35 |

Last updated: 17 November 2002
Source: See Results

=== Premier League ===
==== League table ====
| Pos | Team | Pld | W | D | L | GF | GA | GD | Pts | Qualification or relegation |
|---|---|---|---|---|---|---|---|---|---|---|
| 12 | Alania Vladikavkaz | 30 | 8 | 6 | 16 | 31 | 42 | −11 | 30 | |
| 13 | Uralan Elista | 30 | 6 | 11 | 13 | 32 | 42 | −10 | 29 | |
| 14 | Torpedo-ZIL Moscow | 30 | 6 | 10 | 14 | 20 | 39 | −19 | 28 | |
| 15 | Anzhi Makhachkala (R) | 30 | 5 | 10 | 15 | 22 | 43 | −21 | 25 | Relegation to First Division |
| 16 | Sokol Saratov (R) | 30 | 5 | 8 | 17 | 24 | 45 | −21 | 23 | Relegation to First Division |

Source: RFPL
Rules for classification: 1) points; 2) goal difference; 3) number of goals scored.
(R) Relegated

==== Results by round ====
| Round | 1 | 2 | 3 | 4 | 5 | 6 | 7 | 8 | 9 | 10 | 11 | 12 | 13 | 14 | 15 | 16 | 17 | 18 | 19 | 20 | 21 | 22 | 23 | 24 | 25 | 26 | 27 | 28 | 29 | 30 |
|---|---|---|---|---|---|---|---|---|---|---|---|---|---|---|---|---|---|---|---|---|---|---|---|---|---|---|---|---|---|---|
| Ground | H | A | H | A | H | A | H | A | A | H | A | A | H | A | H | A | H | A | H | H | A | H | H | A | H | A | H | A | H | A |
| Result | W | L | D | L | D | D | D | D | L | W | D | L | D | L | W | D | L | L | L | L | L | W | L | D | L | L | D | L | L | W |

Updated to match(es) played on 17 November 2002. Source: See Results
A = Away; H = Home; W = Win; D = Draw; L = Loss

==== Results ====
| 9 March 2002 1 | Anzhi Makhachkala | 2 – 0 | Zenit St.Petersburg | Makhachkala |
| 16:00 MSK (UTC+4) | Hošić (yellow card) 21'; Stojković (yellow card) 27'; Budunov 31'; Prudius 85' | Report | | Stadium: Dynamo Stadium; Attendance: 15,000; Referee: Valentin Ivanov |

| 13 March 2002 2 | Dynamo Moscow | 2 – 0 | Anzhi Makhachkala | Moscow |
| 19:00 MSK (UTC+4) | Khazov 57', 63'; Novikov (yellow card) 86' | Report | Budunov (yellow card) 41'; Ramazanov (yellow card) 42'; Prudius (yellow card) 77'; Hošić (yellow card) 89' | Stadium: Dynamo Stadium; Attendance: 5,700; Referee: Yuri Klyuchnikov |

| 17 March 2002 3 | Anzhi Makhachkala | 0 – 0 | Torpedo-ZIL Moscow | Makhachkala |
| 16:00 MSK (UTC+4) | Dmytriyev (yellow card) 15'; Ramazanov (yellow card) 53' | Report | Kuznetsov (yellow card) 47' | Stadium: Dynamo Stadium; Attendance: 12,500; Referee: Igor Egorov |

| 23 March 2002 4 | Sokol Saratov | 1 – 0 | Anzhi Makhachkala | Saratov |
| MSK (UTC+4) | Baltiev (yellow card) 24'; Markevich (yellow card) 26'; Cherkes 55' | Report | Glogovac (yellow card) 4'; Adiyev (yellow card) 11'; Bamatov (yellow card) 22'; Akayev (yellow card) 78' | Stadium: Lokomotiv Stadium; Attendance: 12,000; Referee: Mikhail Veselovsky |

| 31 March 2002 5 | Anzhi Makhachkala | 3 – 3 | Spartak Moscow | Makhachkala |
| 17:00 MSK (UTC+4) | Budunov 5'; Prudius 50'; Mzhavanadze (yellow card) 60'; Glogovac (yellow card) 66'; Savelyev 84' | Report | Titov 30'; Beschastnykh 41' (yellow card) 57'; Ananko (yellow card) 63'; Sychev 84' | Stadium: Dynamo Stadium; Attendance: 16,500; Referee: Yuri Chebotaryov |

| 7 April 2002 6 | Saturn-REN TV | 1 – 1 | Anzhi Makhachkala | Ramenskoye |
| 18:00 MSK (UTC+4) | Melyoshin 23'; Džiaukštas (yellow card) 44'; Movsisyan (yellow card) 68' | Report | Savelyev 11'; Ramazanov (yellow card) 23'; Mzhavanadze (yellow card) 58'; Dmytriyev (red card) 68'; Bamatov (yellow card) 83' | Stadium: Saturn Stadium; Attendance: 11,000; Referee: Valery Shaveyko |

| 13 April 2002 7 | Anzhi Makhachkala | 1 – 1 | Uralan Elista | Makhachkala |
| 17:00 MSK (UTC+4) | Ramazanov (yellow card) 57'; Hošić 85' | Report | Avakov (yellow card) 21'; Dzamikhov (yellow card) 70'; Vyazmikin 75' | Stadium: Dynamo Stadium; Attendance: 15,000; Referee: Sergei Martynov |

| 20 April 2002 8 | Alania Vladikavkaz | 1 – 1 | Anzhi Makhachkala | Vladikavkaz |
| 17:00 MSK (UTC+4) | Bazayev 40' (pen.) | Report | Prudius 9'; Mzhavanadze (yellow card) 24'; Hošić (yellow card) 35'; Alekseyev (yellow card) 69'; Budunov (yellow card) 88'; Armishev (yellow card) 90' | Stadium: Republican Spartak Stadium; Attendance: 18,000; Referee: Sergey Lapochkin |

| 27 April 2002 9 | Torpedo Moscow | 3 – 0 | Anzhi Makhachkala | Moscow |
| MSK (UTC+4) | Shirko 27'; Sarkisyan 47'; Semshov 76' | Report | Savelyev (yellow card) 23'; Glogovac (yellow card) 58' | Stadium: Luzhniki Stadium; Attendance: 1,000; Referee: Taras Bezubyak |

| 4 May 2002 10 | Anzhi Makhachkala | 2 – 1 | CSKA Moscow | Makhachkala |
| 18:00 MSK (UTC+4) | Mzhavanadze 21'; Tsymbalar 33'; Hošić (yellow card) 51'; Agalarov (yellow card) 86'; Akayev (yellow card) 90' | Report | Semak (yellow card) 10'; Gusev (yellow card) 13'; Laizāns (yellow card) 35'; Yevsikov (yellow card) 52'; Popov (yellow card) 69'; Dayev 75'; Šemberas (yellow card) 79' | Stadium: Dynamo Stadium; Attendance: 16,000; Referee: Stanislav Sukhina |

| 8 May 2002 11 | Rotor Volgograd | 0 – 0 | Anzhi Makhachkala | Volgograd |
| 17:00 MSK (UTC+4) | | Report | Glogovac (yellow card) 90' | Stadium: Central Stadium; Attendance: 13,600; Referee: Yuri Baskakov |

| 13 May 2002 12 | Krylia Sovetov | 4 – 0 | Anzhi Makhachkala | Samara |
| 18:00 MSK (UTC+4) | Poškus 47'; Anyukov 49'; Vinogradov 50'; Bobyor 59'; Bushmanov (yellow card) 85' | Report | Mzhavanadze (yellow card) 30'; Adiyev (yellow card) 57'; Peremenin (yellow card) 80'; Ramazanov (yellow card) 85' | Stadium: Metallurg Stadium; Attendance: 15,000; Referee: Valentin Ivanov |

| 1 July 2002 13 | Anzhi Makhachkala | 0 – 0 | Lokomotiv Moscow | Makhachkala |
| 18:00 MSK (UTC+4) | Agalarov 68'; Budunov (yellow card) 80'; Bamatov (yellow card) 88' | Report | Obradović (yellow card) 71' | Stadium: Dynamo Stadium; Attendance: 12,000; Referee: Sergey Fursa |

| 9 July 2002 14 | Shinnik | 6 – 0 | Anzhi Makhachkala | Yaroslavl |
| 18:00 MSK (UTC+4) | Grishin (yellow card) 33'; Skokov (yellow card) 36'; Losev 48'; Berco 59'; Kulchy (yellow card) 69'; Vasilyev 75', 78', 82'; Khomukha 88' | Report | Prudius (yellow card) 39'; Ramazanov (yellow card) 52'; Stojković (yellow card) 55' (yellow-red card) 80' | Stadium: Shinnik Stadium; Attendance: 16,000; Referee: Aleksandr Kolobaev |

| 15 July 2002 15 | Anzhi Makhachkala | 4 – 1 | Rostselmash | Makhachkala |
| 18:00 MSK (UTC+4) | Agalarov 9'; Akayev 18'; Bamatov (yellow card) 19'; Savelyev 23'; Gordeyev (yellow card) 57'; Hošić (yellow card) 59'; Budunov 68'; Armishev (yellow card) 81' | Report | Demenko 15' (pen.); Karytska (yellow card) 31'; Demenko (yellow card) 45'; Blyznyuk (yellow card) 58'; Kruščić (yellow card) 71' | Stadium: Dynamo Stadium; Attendance: 8,000; Referee: Yuri Baskakov |

| 23 July 2002 16 | Lokomotiv Moscow | 0 – 0 | Anzhi Makhachkala | Moscow |
| 19:00 MSK (UTC+4) | Vučićević (yellow card) 64' | Report | Prudius (yellow card) 23'; Hošić (yellow card) 39'; Budunov (yellow card) 65'; Aksyonov (yellow card) 71'; Armishev (yellow card) 84' | Stadium: Lokomotiv Stadium; Attendance: 5,000; Referee: Alexander Evstigneev |

| 29 July 2002 17 | Anzhi Makhachkala | 0 – 1 | Shinnik | Makhachkala |
| 19:00 MSK (UTC+4) | | Report | Grishin 3'; Vasilyev (yellow card) 10' | Stadium: Dynamo Stadium; Attendance: 12,000; Referee: Mikhail Khodyrev |

| 3 August 2002 18 | Rostselmash | 2 – 0 | Anzhi Makhachkala | Rostov-on-Don |
| 19:00 MSK (UTC+4) | Fomenka 21'; Mykytyn (yellow card) 24'; Osinov 88' (pen.) | Report | Budunov (yellow card) 54'; Mzhavanadze (yellow card) 60' | Stadium: Olimp-2; Attendance: 6,000; Referee: Mikhail Veselovsky |

| 11 August 2002 19 | Anzhi Makhachkala | 0 – 2 | Krylia Sovetov | Makhachkala |
| 18:30 MSK (UTC+4) | Mzhavanadze (yellow card) 48'; Bamatov (yellow card) 56'; Ramazanov (yellow card) 80' | Report | Karyaka 30', 46'; Bobyor (yellow card) 45' | Stadium: Dynamo Stadium; Attendance: 8,000; Referee: Valery Shaveyko |

| 17 August 2002 20 | Anzhi Makhachkala | 0 – 1 | Torpedo Moscow | Makhachkala |
| 18:00 MSK (UTC+4) | Hošić (yellow card) 19'; Ramazanov (yellow card) 21'; Stojković (yellow card) 28'; Budunov (yellow card) 53' | Report | Malay (yellow card) 6'; Ajinjal (yellow card) 21'; Semshov 50'; Jolović (yellow card) 60'; Leonchenko (yellow card) 64' | Stadium: Dynamo Stadium; Attendance: 6,000; Referee: Nikolai Ivanov |

| 25 August 2002 21 | CSKA Moscow | 3 – 1 | Anzhi Makhachkala | Moscow |
| 17:00 MSK (UTC+4) | Laizāns (yellow card) 5'; Popov 26'; Kirichenko (yellow card) 41'; Semak 59'; Gusev 67'; Dayev (yellow card) 90' | Report | Glogovac (yellow card) 29'; Mzhavanadze (yellow card) 31'; Aksyonov 39'; Babych (yellow card) 52'; Hošić (yellow card) 65'; Willer (yellow card) 82' | Stadium: Eduard Streltsov Stadium; Attendance: 8,000; Referee: Vladimir Vlasov |

| 1 September 2002 22 | Anzhi Makhachkala | 2 – 1 | Rotor Volgograd | Makhachkala |
| 17:00 MSK (UTC+4) | Willer (yellow card) 27'; Agalarov (yellow card) 29'; Pelcis 52'; Stojković (yellow card) 85'; Budunov 87'; Aksyonov (red card) 90' | Report | Smirnov (yellow card) 66'; Krivov (yellow card) 89'; Yesipov 90' | Stadium: Dynamo Stadium; Attendance: 10,000; Referee: Valentin Ivanov |

| 11 September 2002 23 | Anzhi Makhachkala | 0 – 1 | Sokol Saratov | Makhachkala |
| 17:00 MSK (UTC+4) | Budunov (yellow card) 32'; Agalarov (yellow card) 32'; Stojković (yellow card) 44'; Babych (yellow card) 77' | Report | Cherkes (yellow card) 18'; Baltiev (yellow card) 25'; Samoylov (yellow card) 56'; Bugakov (yellow card) 75'; Sakiyev 88' | Stadium: Dynamo Stadium; Attendance: 13,000; Referee: Mikhail Khodyrev |

| 23 September 2002 24 | Zenit St. Petersburg | 2 – 2 | Anzhi Makhachkala | Saint Petersburg |
| 19:00 MSK (UTC+4) | Arshavin (yellow card) 23'; Spivak 34' (pen.); Ranđelović 76' | Report | Agalarov (yellow card) 5'; Willer (yellow card) 13' (goal) 29' (pen.); Stojković (yellow card) 19'; Mitrofanov 25'; Armishev (yellow card) 42'; Pelcis (yellow card) 71'; Velička (yellow card) 88' | Stadium: Petrovsky Stadium; Attendance: 13,000; Referee: Mikhail Veselovsky |

| 28 September 2002 25 | Anzhi Makhachkala | 0 – 1 | Dynamo Moscow | Makhachkala |
| 16:30 MSK (UTC+4) | Velička (yellow card) 61'; Babych (yellow card) 76' | Report | Žutautas (yellow card) 21'; Česnauskis (yellow card) 23'; Covalenco (yellow card) 56'; Khazov (yellow card) 73'; Bulykin 85' | Stadium: Dynamo Stadium; Attendance: 10,000; Referee: Stanislav Sukhina |

| 7 October 2002 26 | Torpedo-ZIL Moscow | 1 – 0 | Anzhi Makhachkala | Moscow |
| 18:00 MSK (UTC+4) | Kornaukhov 21' (pen.); Tsaplin (yellow card) 43'; Novosadov (yellow card) 90+'; Komadina (yellow card) 90+' | Report | Hošić (yellow card) 21'; Stojković (yellow card) 24'; Mzhavanadze (yellow card) 79'; Budunov (yellow card) 90+' | Stadium: Eduard Streltsov Stadium; Attendance: 4,000; Referee: Sergey Fursa |

| 26 October 2002 27 | Anzhi Makhachkala | 1 – 1 | Saturn-REN TV | Makhachkala |
| 16:00 MSK (UTC+4) | Velička 3'; Gordeyev (yellow card) 58'; Babych (yellow card) 40'; Stojković (yellow card) 76' | Report | Lyapkin (yellow card) 15'; Melyoshin (yellow card) 28'; Rebeja (yellow card) 51'; Medvedev 53' | Stadium: Dynamo Stadium; Attendance: 8,000; Referee: Alexandr Kolobnev |

| 2 November 2002 28 | Spartak Moscow | 2 – 1 | Anzhi Makhachkala | Moscow |
| MSK (UTC+4) | Baranov (yellow card) 13'; Kovtun 25'; Essien (yellow card) 46'; Danishevsky (yellow card) 47'; Danishevsky 50' | Report | Babych 5'; Bamatov (yellow card) 9' | Stadium: Eduard Streltsov Stadium; Attendance: 9,000; Referee: Taras Bezubyak |

| 10 November 2002 29 | Anzhi Makhachkala | 0 – 1 | Alania Vladikavkaz | Makhachkala |
| 17:00 MSK (UTC+4) | Stojković (yellow card) 60'; Stanciu (yellow card) 83' | Report | Demetradze (yellow card) 38'; Tarlowski (yellow card) 66'; Bazayev 85' | Stadium: Dynamo Stadium; Attendance: 8,000; Referee: Yuri Baskakov |

| 17 November 2002 30 | Uralan Elista | 0 – 1 | Anzhi Makhachkala | Elista |
| 16:00 MSK (UTC+4) | Ovshinov (yellow card) 30' (yellow-red card) 56'; Burchenko (yellow card) 32' | Report | Bamatov 22'; Mzhavanadze (yellow card) 27'; Willer (yellow card) 60'; Gordeyev (yellow card) 62' | Stadium: Uralan Stadium; Attendance: 5,500; Referee: Yury Chebotaryov |

=== Russian Cup ===
==== 2002-03 ====
| 29 June 2002 Round of 32 | Kuban Krasnodar | 1 – 2 | Anzhi Makhachkala | Krasnodar |
| 16:00 MSK (UTC+4) | Lysenko 11'; Selin (yellow card) 20'; Tonga (yellow card) 40' (yellow-red card) 83'; Zezin (yellow card) 63'; Topchu (yellow card) 83' | Report | Ramazanov (yellow card) 16'; Budunov 23', 87' (yellow card) 89'; Prudius (yellow card) 40'; Willer (yellow card) 70'; Babych (yellow card) 75' | Stadium: Kuban Stadium; Attendance: 10,000; Referee: Vladimir Pettay |

Progress to Round of 16 in 2003 Season

== Squad statistics ==
As of match played 17 November 2002

=== Appearances and goals ===
| No. | Pos | Nat | Player | Total | | Premier League | | Russian Cup | |
| No. | Pos | Nat | Player | Apps | Goals | Apps | Goals | Apps | Goals |
|---|---|---|---|---|---|---|---|---|---|
| 1 | GK | (Russia) RUS | Sergey Armishev | 25 | 0 | 24 | 0 | 1 | 0 |
| 4 | MF | (Ukraine) UKR | Vladyslav Prudius | 24 | 3 | 21+2 | 3 | 1 | 0 |
| 5 | DF | (Russia) RUS | Igor Aksyonov | 15 | 1 | 12+2 | 1 | 0+1 | 0 |
| 6 | DF | (Russia) RUS | Andrei Gordeyev | 11 | 0 | 10+1 | 0 | 0 | 0 |
| 7 | MF | (Uzbekistan) UZB | Ruslan Agalarov | 23 | 1 | 20+3 | 1 | 0 | 0 |
| 8 | DF | (Georgia (country)) GEO | Kakhaber Mzhavanadze | 28 | 1 | 25+2 | 1 | 1 | 0 |
| 9 | FW | (Russia) RUS | Budun Budunov | 29 | 4 | 28 | 4 | 1 | 0 |
| 10 | MF | (Russia) RUS | Gadzhi Bamatov | 15 | 1 | 10+5 | 1 | 0 | 0 |
| 12 | MF | (Brazil) BRA | Willer | 12 | 1 | 7+4 | 1 | 1 | 0 |
| 13 | MF | (Russia) RUS | Murad Ramazanov | 26 | 0 | 16+9 | 0 | 1 | 0 |
| 14 | DF | (Russia) RUS | Arsen Akayev | 12 | 1 | 12 | 1 | 0 | 0 |
| 15 | FW | (Russia) RUS | Valery Alekseyev | 9 | 0 | 9 | 0 | 0 | 0 |
| 16 | GK | (Bosnia and Herzegovina) BIH | Amel Mujčinović | 6 | 0 | 6 | 0 | 0 | 0 |
| 18 | DF | (Bosnia and Herzegovina) BIH | Stevo Glogovac | 17 | 0 | 13+4 | 0 | 0 | 0 |
| 19 | DF | (Federal Republic of Yugoslavia) YUG | Nebojša Stojković | 21 | 0 | 21 | 0 | 0 | 0 |
| 21 | MF | (Kyrgyzstan) KGZ | Sergei Ivanov | 2 | 0 | 2 | 0 | 0 | 0 |
| 22 | DF | (Bosnia and Herzegovina) BIH | Dženan Hošić | 22 | 1 | 14+7 | 1 | 1 | 0 |
| 27 | MF | (Russia) RUS | Aleksei Savelyev | 21 | 3 | 20+1 | 3 | 0 | 0 |
| 30 | FW | (Uzbekistan) UZB | Jafar Irismetov | 11 | 0 | 4+7 | 0 | 0 | 0 |
| 40 | DF | (Ukraine) UKR | Oleksandr Babych | 12 | 1 | 11 | 1 | 1 | 0 |
| 41 | DF | (Romania) ROU | Nicolae Stanciu | 10 | 0 | 9 | 0 | 1 | 0 |
| 42 | DF | (Lithuania) LTU | Tadas Papečkys | 1 | 0 | 0+1 | 0 | 0 | 0 |
| 43 | FW | (Lithuania) LTU | Andrius Velička | 6 | 1 | 5 | 1 | 0+1 | 0 |
| 44 | MF | (Ukraine) UKR | Oleksandr Mitrofanov | 14 | 1 | 10+3 | 1 | 1 | 0 |
| 45 | MF | (Bosnia and Herzegovina) BIH | Amir Hamzić | 4 | 0 | 2+2 | 0 | 0 | 0 |
| 54 | FW | (Bosnia and Herzegovina) BIH | Hadis Zubanović | 1 | 0 | 0+1 | 0 | 0 | 0 |
| 66 | MF | (Ghana) GHA | Emmanuel Osei Kuffour | 6 | 0 | 4+1 | 0 | 1 | 0 |
Players who appeared for Anzhi Makhachkala but left during the season:
| 2 | DF | (Turkmenistan) TKM | Denis Peremenin | 9 | 0 | 3+6 | 0 | 0 | 0 |
| 20 | MF | (Russia) RUS | Ilya Tsymbalar | 8 | 1 | 5+3 | 1 | 0 | 0 |
| 23 | DF | (Ukraine) UKR | Serhiy Dmytriyev | 10 | 0 | 5+5 | 0 | 0 | 0 |
| 31 | FW | (Russia) RUS | Magomed Adiev | 12 | 0 | 12 | 0 | 0 | 0 |
| 53 | FW | (Latvia) LAT | Ēriks Pelcis | 3 | 1 | 0+3 | 1 | 0 | 0 |

=== Goal Scorers ===
| Place | Position | Nation | Number | Name | Premier League | Russian Cup | Total |
|---|---|---|---|---|---|---|---|
| 1 | FW | (Russia) | 9 | Budun Budunov | 4 | 2 | 6 |
| 2 | MF | (Ukraine) | 4 | Vladyslav Prudius | 3 | 0 | 3 |
| 2 | MF | (Russia) | 27 | Aleksei Savelyev | 3 | 0 | 3 |
| 3 | DF | (Ukraine) | 40 | Oleksandr Babych | 1 | 0 | 1 |
| 3 | DF | (Russia) | 14 | Arsen Akayev | 1 | 0 | 1 |
| 3 | DF | (Bosnia and Herzegovina) | 22 | Dženan Hošić | 1 | 0 | 1 |
| 3 | MF | (Russia) | 5 | Igor Aksyonov | 1 | 0 | 1 |
| 3 | DF | (Georgia (country)) | 8 | Kakhaber Mzhavanadze | 1 | 0 | 1 |
| 3 | MF | (Uzbekistan) | 7 | Ruslan Agalarov | 1 | 0 | 1 |
| 3 | MF | (Ukraine) | 44 | Oleksandr Mitrofanov | 1 | 0 | 1 |
| 3 | MF | (Russia) | 20 | Ilya Tsymbalar | 1 | 0 | 1 |
| 3 | MF | (Brazil) | 12 | Willer | 1 | 0 | 1 |
| 3 | FW | (Russia) | 10 | Gadzhi Bamatov | 1 | 0 | 1 |
| 3 | FW | (Latvia) | 53 | Ēriks Pelcis | 1 | 0 | 1 |
| 3 | FW | (Lithuania) | 43 | Andrius Velička | 1 | 0 | 1 |
| | | | | TOTALS | 22 | 2 | 24 |

=== Clean sheets ===
| Place | Position | Nation | Number | Name | Premier League | Russian Cup | Total |
|---|---|---|---|---|---|---|---|
| 1 | GK | (Russia) | 1 | Sergey Armishev | 4 | 0 | 4 |
| 2 | GK | (Bosnia and Herzegovina) | 16 | Amel Mujčinović | 2 | 0 | 2 |
| | | | | TOTALS | 6 | 0 | 6 |

=== Disciplinary record ===
| Number | Nation | Position | Name | Premier League | | Russian Cup | | Total | |
| Number | Nation | Position | Name | Booked | Sent off (straight red) | Booked | Sent off (straight red) | Booked | Sent off (straight red) |
| 1 | (Russia) | GK | Sergey Armishev | 4 | 0 | 0 | 0 | 4 | 0 |
| 4 | (Ukraine) | MF | Vladyslav Prudius | 3 | 0 | 1 | 0 | 4 | 0 |
| 5 | (Russia) | MF | Igor Aksyonov | 1 | 1 | 0 | 0 | 1 | 1 |
| 6 | (Russia) | MF | Andrei Gordeyev | 3 | 0 | 0 | 0 | 3 | 0 |
| 7 | (Uzbekistan) | MF | Ruslan Agalarov | 4 | 0 | 0 | 0 | 4 | 0 |
| 8 | (Georgia (country)) | DF | Kakhaber Mzhavanadze | 9 | 0 | 0 | 0 | 9 | 0 |
| 9 | (Russia) | FW | Budun Budunov | 8 | 0 | 1 | 0 | 9 | 0 |
| 10 | (Russia) | MF | Gadzhi Bamatov | 6 | 0 | 0 | 0 | 6 | 0 |
| 12 | (Brazil) | MF | Willer | 4 | 0 | 1 | 0 | 5 | 0 |
| 13 | (Russia) | MF | Murad Ramazanov | 8 | 0 | 1 | 0 | 9 | 0 |
| 14 | (Russia) | DF | Arsen Akayev | 2 | 0 | 0 | 0 | 2 | 0 |
| 15 | (Russia) | FW | Valery Alekseyev | 1 | 0 | 0 | 0 | 1 | 0 |
| 18 | (Bosnia and Herzegovina) | DF | Stevo Glogovac | 5 | 0 | 0 | 0 | 5 | 0 |
| 19 | (Federal Republic of Yugoslavia) | DF | Nebojša Stojković | 10 | 1 | 0 | 0 | 10 | 1 |
| 22 | (Bosnia and Herzegovina) | DF | Dženan Hošić | 9 | 0 | 0 | 0 | 9 | 0 |
| 27 | (Russia) | MF | Aleksei Savelyev | 1 | 0 | 0 | 0 | 1 | 0 |
| 40 | (Ukraine) | DF | Oleksandr Babych | 4 | 0 | 1 | 0 | 5 | 0 |
| 41 | (Romania) | DF | Nicolae Stanciu | 1 | 0 | 0 | 0 | 1 | 0 |
| 43 | (Lithuania) | FW | Andrius Velička | 2 | 0 | 0 | 0 | 2 | 0 |
Players who left Anzhi Makhachkala during the season:
| 2 | (Turkmenistan) | MF | Denis Peremenin | 1 | 0 | 0 | 0 | 1 | 0 |
| 23 | (Ukraine) | DF | Serhiy Dmytriyev | 1 | 1 | 0 | 0 | 1 | 1 |
| 31 | (Russia) | FW | Magomed Adiyev | 2 | 0 | 0 | 0 | 2 | 0 |
| 53 | (Latvia) | FW | Ēriks Pelcis | 1 | 0 | 0 | 0 | 1 | 0 |
| | | | TOTALS | 90 | 3 | 5 | 0 | 95 | 3 |
