= Willer (footballer) =

Brazilian footballer (born 1979)

Personal information
- Full name: Willer Souza Oliveira
- Date of birth: 18 November 1979 (age 46)
- Place of birth: Aldeias Altas, Brazil
- Height: 1.72 m (5 ft 7 1/2 in)
- Position: Midfielder

Senior career*
Years	Team	Apps	(Gls)
1999–2001	Itapipoca		
2001	Independiente		
2002–2004	Anzhi Makhachkala	29	(2)
2004–2005	Dynamo Bryansk	39	(5)
2005–2006	Luch-Energia Vladivostok	11	(0)
2006	→ Oryol (loan)	22	(7)
2007–2008	Sūduva Marijampolė	44	(13)
2008	Smorgon	12	(0)
2009	Fortaleza	1	(0)
2009–2010	Ferroviário		
2010	Alianza	20	(5)
2011	Horizonte	10	(0)
2011	Wigry Suwałki	18	(2)
2012	Alianza	10	(0)
2012–2013	Halcones	18	(5)
2013–2014	Istiqlol Dushanbe	17	(4)
2014	Halcones	19	(1)
2015–2016	Itapipoca	11	(0)
- * Club domestic league appearances and goals

Willer Souza Oliveira (born 18 November 1979) or simply Willer, is a Brazilian former professional footballer who played as a midfielder.

== Career ==
Willer Souza Oliveira began his career in Brazil with Itapipoca Esporte Clube before moving to Argentinian club Independiente in 2001.

=== Eastern Europe ===
Following a transfer to Russia with FC Anzhi Makhachkala (36 matches, 2 goals) in 2002. he subsequently signed for FC Dynamo Bryansk (42 matches, 8 goals) in 2004–2005, enjoying popularity from supporters for his flamboyant approach and acrobatic goalscoring celebrations. This success earned Willer a move to Russian Far East side Luch-Energia Vladivostok in 2005 - promoted team to First Division, and he did a considerable impact in a Russian Cup match against FC Rostov. In the summer of 2006, he went on loan to FC Oryol until the end of the year (22 matches, 7 goals).

In April 2007 Willer completed his move to Lithuanian outfit FK Sūduva, scoring 10 goals in 30 matches, as Suduva finished second behind FBK Kaunas. Willer also played UEFA Cup for Sūduva, creating a goal against Northern Ireland's Dungannon Swifts in August 2007 (Qualify round - won 4x0). In 2008, Willer joined FC Smorgon in Belarus where he played until December (12 matches, 3 goals).

=== Alianza ===
In 2009, he moved to Fortaleza Esporte Clube to play Campeonato Brasileiro Serie B (second division). In 2010, Willer joined first division club Alianza of El Salvador. He was considered the best foreign soccer player in the Apertura 2010 and He did 5 goals and 7 assistances in 20 matches. He was the number 10 and appeared in all games. Alianza went to final after 6 years but lost on penalties (3 x 4 Metapan). He moved to Horizonte in 2011 to play Brazil Cup and State Cup of Ceará Province. He moved to Wigry Suwałki on 30 June 2011.

He returned to Alianza before the 2012 Clausura.

=== Istiqlol Dushanbe ===
In January 2013, Willer signed a contract with Tajik League side Istiqlol Dushanbe, joining them in March of the same year. Willer went on to be named 'Best Player' for May 2013 by Tajikistan Football Federation.

=== Halcones Return ===
In June 2014, Willer returned to Halcones FC.

== Career statistics ==
As of 30 December 2014

Club performance			League		Cup		Continental		Other		Total	
Season	Club	League	Apps	Goals	Apps	Goals	Apps	Goals	Apps	Goals	Apps	Goals
2002	Anzhi Makhachkala	Russian Premier League	11	1	2	0	–		–		13	1
2003	Anzhi Makhachkala	FNL	15	1	5	0	–		–		20	1
2004	Anzhi Makhachkala	FNL	3	0	0	0	–		–		3	0
2004	Dynamo Bryansk	FNL	20	3		0	–		–		20	3
2005	Dynamo Bryansk	FNL	19	2		0	–		–		19	2
2005	Luch-Energiya	FNL	11	0		0	–		–		11	0
2006	Luch-Energiya	FNL	7	1		0	–		–		7	1
2006	Oryol (loan)	FNL	22	7		0	–		–		22	7
2007	Sūduva Marijampolė	A Lyga	33	12			2	0	–		35	12
2008	Sūduva Marijampolė	A Lyga	11	1			–		–		11	1
2008	Smorgon	Vysheyshaya Liga	12	0			–		–			
2009	Itapipoca	Campeonato Cearense					–		–			
2009	Fortaleza	Campeonato Cearense	1	0			–		–			
2009	Ferroviário	Campeonato Cearense					–		–			
2010	Itapipoca	Campeonato Cearense					–		–			
2010	Alianza	La Primera					–		–			
2010	Alianza	La Primera					–		–			
2011	Horizonte	Campeonato Cearense					–		–			
2011-12	Wigry Suwałki	II liga	18	2	1	0	–		–		19	2
2012	Alianza	La Primera	10	0	–		–		–		10	0
2012–13	Halcones	Liga Mayor "A"	20	6	–		–		–		20	6
2013	Istiklol	Tajik League	15	4			–		–		15	4
2014	Istiklol	Tajik League	2	0	0	0	–		1	0	3	0
2014–15	Halcones	Liga Mayor "A"	19	1	–		–		–		19	1
Total	Russia		108	15	7	0	–		–		115	15
Total	Lithuania		44	13			2	0	–		46	13
Total	Belarus		12	0			–		–		12	0
Total	Brazil						–		–			
Total	El Salvador		10	0	–		–		–		10	0
Total	Poland		18	2	1	0	–		–		19	2
Total	Guatemala		39	7	–		–		–		39	7
Total	Tajikistan		21	1	2	0	–		1	0	24	1
Career total			252	38	10	0	–		1	0	263	38

== Honors ==
Istiklol

- Tajik Cup: 2013
- Tajik Super Cup: 2014
