= Ruslan Agalarov =

Uzbek footballer (born 1974)

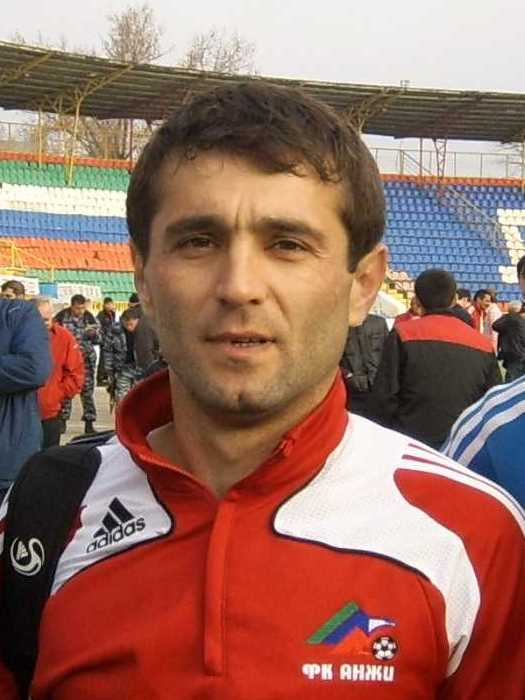

Personal information
- Full name: Ruslan Agabekovich Agalarov
- Date of birth: 21 February 1974 (age 52)
- Place of birth: Makhachkala, Russian SFSR
- Height: 1.70 m (5 ft 7 in)
- Position: Midfielder

Senior career*
Years	Team	Apps	(Gls)
1991–1993	Kaspiy Kaspiysk	64	(2)
1993–1998	Anzhi Makhachkala	170	(18)
1998	Lokomotiv-KMV Mineralnye Vody	19	(4)
1999–2005	Anzhi Makhachkala	202	(24)
2005–2007	Dynamo Makhachkala	54	(15)
2007–2008	Anzhi Makhachkala	57	(8)
Total		566	(71)

International career
2001	Uzbekistan	1	(0)

Managerial career
- 2010–2014: Anzhi Makhachkala (coach)
- 2014–2015: Anzhi-2 Makhachkala
- 2015: Anzhi Makhachkala (U21)
- 2015–2016: Anzhi Makhachkala (caretaker)
- 2018: Legion Dynamo Makhachkala
- 2019–2021: Makhachkala
- * Club domestic league appearances and goals

Ruslan Agabekovich Agalarov (Russian: Руслан Агабекович Агаларов; born 21 February 1974) is an Uzbek professional football manager and a former midfielder. Born in the USSR, he represented the Uzbekistan national team.

== International career ==
Agalarov was born in the USSR, and is of Dagestani descent. He chose to play for the Uzbekistan national team, and earned 1 cap for them.

== Managerial career ==
On 29 September 2015, Agalarov was appointed as caretaker manager of FC Anzhi Makhachkala following the departure of Yuri Semin. He left Anzhi at the end of the 2015–16 season, after securing Anzhi's place in the Russian Premier League with a play-off victory over Volgar Astrakhan.

== Personal life ==
His son Gamid Agalarov and his younger brother Kamil Agalarov are also professional footballers.

== Career statistics ==
=== Club ===
Appearances and goals by club, season and competition
Club	Season	League			National cup		Continental		Total	
Club	Season	Division	Apps	Goals	Apps	Goals	Apps	Goals	Apps	Goals
Kaspiy Kaspiysk	1991	Soviet Second League B IV Zone	32	0			–		32	0
Kaspiy Kaspiysk	1992	Russian Second Division	32	2			–		32	2
Kaspiy Kaspiysk	Total		64	2			0	0	64	2
Anzhi Makhachkala	1993	Russian Second Division	34	4			–		34	4
Anzhi Makhachkala	1994	Russian Second Division	29	1			–		29	1
Anzhi Makhachkala	1995	Russian Second Division	34	2			–		34	2
Anzhi Makhachkala	1996	Russian Second Division	37	8			–		37	8
Anzhi Makhachkala	1997	FNL	36	3			–		36	3-
Anzhi Makhachkala	Total		170	18			0	0	170	18
Lokomotiv-Taym Mineralnye Vody	1998	III division	19	4			–		19	4
Anzhi Makhachkala	1999	FNL	38	6			–		38	6
Anzhi Makhachkala	2000	RPL	28	2			–		28	2
Anzhi Makhachkala	2001	RPL	29	5	2	0	1	0	32	5
Anzhi Makhachkala	2002	RPL	23	1	1	0	–		23	1
Anzhi Makhachkala	2003	FNL	40	5			–		40	5
Anzhi Makhachkala	2004	FNL	39	5			–		39	5
Anzhi Makhachkala	2005	FNL	5	0			–		5	0
Anzhi Makhachkala	Total		202	24	3	0	1	0	206	24
Dynamo Makhachkala	2005	FNL	17	7			–		17	7
Dynamo Makhachkala	2006	FNL	37	8			–		37	8
Dynamo Makhachkala	Total		54	15			0	0	54	15
Anzhi Makhachkala	2007	FNL	35	6			–		35	6
Anzhi Makhachkala	2008	FNL	22	2			–		22	2
Anzhi Makhachkala	Total		57	8			0	0	57	8
Career total			566	71	3	0	1	0	570	71

=== International ===
Appearances and goals by national team and year
National team	Year	Apps	Goals
Uzbekistan	2001	1	0
Total		1	0

== Managerial statistics ==
Information correct as of match played 27 May 2016. Only competitive matches are counted.

Team	From	To	P	W	D	L	GS	GA	%W	Honours	Notes
(Russia) Anzhi Makhachkala	29 September 2015	31 May 2016	24	8	5	11	28	40	33.33		
