= Gadzhi Budunov =

Russian footballer (born 2007)

Personal information
- Full name: Gadzhi Budunovich Budunov
- Date of birth: 11 February 2007 (age 19)
- Place of birth: Khuchada, Shamilsky District, Russia
- Height: 1.80 m (5 ft 11 in)
- Position: Centre-forward

Team information
- Current team: Mashuk-KMV Pyatigorsk (on loan from Dynamo Makhachkala)
- Number: 9

Youth career
- 2015–2017: RDYuSSh Makhachkala
- 2017–2021: Anzhi Makhachkala
- 2022–2024: Dynamo-Moscow Makhachkala

Senior career*
Years	Team	Apps	(Gls)
2024–	Dynamo Makhachkala	3	(0)
2024–	→ Dynamo-2 Makhachkala	28	(9)
2026–	→ Mashuk-KMV Pyatigorsk (loan)	8	(2)
- * Club domestic league appearances and goals as of 15 November 2026

Gadzhi Budunovich Budunov (Russian: Гаджи Будунович Будунов; born 11 February 2007) is a Russian football player who plays as a centre-forward for Mashuk-KMV Pyatigorsk on loan from Dynamo Makhachkala.

== Career ==
Budunov made his debut in the Russian Premier League for Dynamo Makhachkal on 3 August 2025 in a game against Akhmat Grozny.

== Career statistics ==
As of 4 April 2026

Club	Season	League			Cup		Total	
Club	Season	Division	Apps	Goals	Apps	Goals	Apps	Goals
Dynamo-2 Makhachkala	2024	Russian Second League B	9	2	–		9	2
Dynamo-2 Makhachkala	2025	Russian Second League B	2	1	–		2	1
Dynamo-2 Makhachkala	2026	Russian Second League B	2	0	–		2	0
Dynamo-2 Makhachkala	Total		13	3	0	0	13	3
Dynamo Makhachkala	2024–25	Russian Premier League	0	0	0	0	0	0
Dynamo Makhachkala	2025–26	Russian Premier League	3	0	4	0	7	0
Dynamo Makhachkala	Total		3	0	4	0	7	0
Career total			16	3	4	0	20	3

== Personal life ==
Gadzhi's father Budun Budunov also played football professionally.
