= Oleksandr Mitrofanov =

Ukrainian footballer

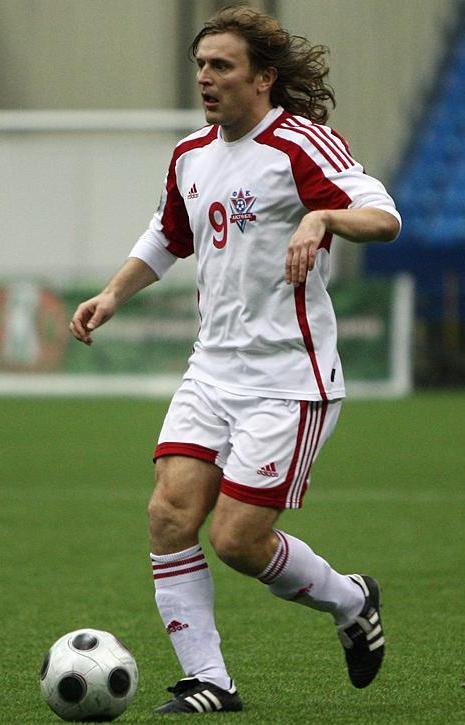

Personal information
- Date of birth: 1 November 1977 (age 49)
- Place of birth: Dzhankoi, Soviet Union
- Height: 1.74 m (5 ft 8 1/2 in)
- Position: Midfielder

Senior career*
Years	Team	Apps	(Gls)
1995	Tavriya Simferopol	1	(0)
1995	KZEZO Kakhovka	17	(0)
1996–2002	Tavriya Simferopol	109	(7)
2001	→ Dynamo Simferopol (loan)	1	(0)
2002	Anzhi Makhachkala	13	(1)
2002–2003	Tavriya Simferopol	5	(0)
2003	→ Kristall Smolensk (loan)	19	(2)
2003	Volyn Lutsk	13	(1)
2004–2009	Aktobe	148	(26)
2010	Ordabasy	27	(4)

International career
1998	Ukraine U21	2	(0)
- * Club domestic league appearances and goals as of 31 December 2014

Oleksandr Mitrofanov (Ukrainian: Олександр Митрофанов; born 1 November 1977) is a footballer who last played as a midfielder for Kazakhstan Premier League side FC Ordabasy.
