= Nebojša Stojković =

Serbian footballer

Personal information
- Date of birth: 2 June 1974 (age 52)
- Height: 1.87 m (6 ft 1 1/2 in)
- Position: Defender

Senior career*
Years	Team	Apps	(Gls)
1991–1992	Dubočica	14	(1)
1992–1994	Vučje	27	(2)
1994–2000	Pobeda	167	(7)
2000–2005	Anzhi Makhachkala	145	(5)
2005–2009	Pobeda	45	(4)
2009–2011	Dubočica	18	(1)
Total		416	(20)
- * Club domestic league appearances and goals

Nebojša Stojković (Serbian Cyrillic: Небојша Стојковић; born 2 June 1974) is a Serbian retired football player.

== Honours ==
Anzhi Makhachkala

- Russian Cup finalist: 2000–01

Pobeda

- Macedonian First Football League champion: 2006–07
