= Dragan Glogovac =

Bosnian Serb footballer

Personal information
- Date of birth: 27 October 1967 (age 58)
- Place of birth: Bileća, SFR Yugoslavia
- Height: 1.73 m (5 ft 8 in)
- Position: Midfielder

Senior career*
| Years | Team | Apps | (Gls) |
| 1986–1988 | Hercegovac Bileća | | |
| 1988–1989 | Neretva | | |
| 1989–1992 | Velež Mostar | 23 | (1) |
| 1992–1995 | Rad | 62 | (13) |
| 1995–1996 | Getafe | 15 | (1) |
| 1996–1998 | Royal Antwerp | 31 | (3) |
| 1998 | Apollon Athens | 9 | (0) |
| 1999 | Shandong Luneng | 5 | (0) |
| 1999–2000 | Radnički Beograd | | |
| 2000–2002 | Sartid Smederevo | 45 | (2) |
- * Club domestic league appearances and goals

Dragan Glogovac (Serbian Cyrillic: Драган Глоговац; born 27 October 1967) is a Bosnian Serb former footballer.

== Club career ==
Born in Bileća, SR Bosnia and Herzegovina, he started playing in the local club FK Hercegovac where he became member of the first team very young. Then he moved to NK Neretva and his good exhibitions brought him to the ranks of a Yugoslav First League club FK Velež Mostar.

After the breakup of Yugoslavia, he moved to Serbia and signed with FK Rad. He stayed in Belgrade until 1995 when he moved to the Spanish club Getafe CF. After one season, he moved to Belgium where he played in Royal Antwerp for two seasons. He still played in Greece in Apollon Athens and in China before returning to Serbia. He ended his career in 2002 playing for one of the growing Serbian clubs in the turn of the century, the FK Sartid, nowadays called FK Smederevo.

== Personal life ==
His brother Stevan Glogovac was also a footballer.
