= Patrice Tonga =

Cameroonian-Russian footballer

Personal information
- Full name: Patrice Tonga
- Date of birth: September 2, 1975 (age 51)
- Place of birth: Douala, Cameroon
- Height: 1.75 m (5 ft 9 in)
- Position: Defender

Youth career
- Dynamo Douala

Senior career*
Years	Team	Apps	(Gls)
1996	Unisport FC		
1997	Dynamo Douala		
1998	Kolomna	30	(3)
1999	Sibiryak Bratsk	17	(1)
2001–2004	Kuban Krasnodar	87	(1)
2004	Neftekhimik Nizhnekamsk	11	(0)
2005–2006	Dynamo Makhachkala	58	(9)
Total		203	(14)

International career^{‡}
1995	Cameroon U20		
- * Club domestic league appearances and goals as of 25 September 2015 ‡ National team caps and goals as of 25 September 2015

Patrice Tonga (Russian: Патрис Тонга; born September 2, 1975) is a retired Cameroonian professional footballer, who played the majority of his career in Russia, gaining Russian citizenship in the process.

== Career ==
=== Club ===
Tonga played youth football for his local club Dynamo Douala, before moving to Unisport FC where he won the Cameroonian Premier League in 1996. Tong moved back to Dynamo Douala in 1997 before moving to Krasnodar in Russia to study at the University of Physical Culture. After being recommended to FC Kolomna by one of his teachers, who were holding a pre-season camp in Krasnodar, Tonga signed with the team. Tonga spent a year with FC Kolomna before moving onto Sibiryak Bratsk. Due to a ban on foreign players playing in the Russian Second Division, Tonga missed the entire 2000 season. Jerry-Christian Tchuissé, with whom Tonga lived with as a student in Krasnodar, invited Tonga to play in an Inter-University Championship for Cameroon, which they won. In 2001, FC Kuban Krasnodar manager Oleg Dolmatov invited to Tonga for a trial, which lead to a permanent contract with the club. Tonga scored his only goal for Kuban in a match against Spartak Nalchik in 2002. Tonga left Kuban midway through the 2004 season, signing for Neftekhimik Nizhnekamsk before moving to Dynamo Makhachkala in 2005 where he finished his professional career in 2006.

=== International ===
Tonga claimed that he was a part of Cameroon U20 at the 1995 FIFA World Youth Championship in Qatar.

== Career statistics ==
=== Club ===
Appearances and goals by club, season and competition
Club	Season	League			National Cup		Other		Total	
Club	Season	Division	Apps	Goals	Apps	Goals	Apps	Goals	Apps	Goals
Kolomna	1998	Russian Second Division	30	3			-		30	3
Sibiryak Bratsk	1999	Russian Second Division	17	1			-		17	1
Kuban Krasnodar	2001	Russian First Division	26	0	3	0	-		29	0
Kuban Krasnodar	2002	Russian First Division	26	1	2	0	-		28	1
Kuban Krasnodar	2003	Russian First Division	35	0	1	0	-		35	0
Kuban Krasnodar	2004	Russian Premier League	0	0	1	0	-		1	0
Kuban Krasnodar	Total		87	1	7	0	-	-	94	1
Neftekhimik Nizhnekamsk	2004	Russian First Division	11	0			-		11	0
Dynamo Makhachkala	2005	Russian First Division	30	6	2	0	-		32	6
Dynamo Makhachkala	2006	Russian First Division	28	3	1	0	-		29	3
Dynamo Makhachkala	Total		58	9	3	0	-	-	61	9
Career total			203	14	10	0	-	-	213	14

== Honours ==
Unisport

- Cameroonian Premier League (1): 1996
