= Anzhi Arena =

Football stadium in Kaspiysk, Dagestan, Russia

Anzhi Arena (Anji Arena)
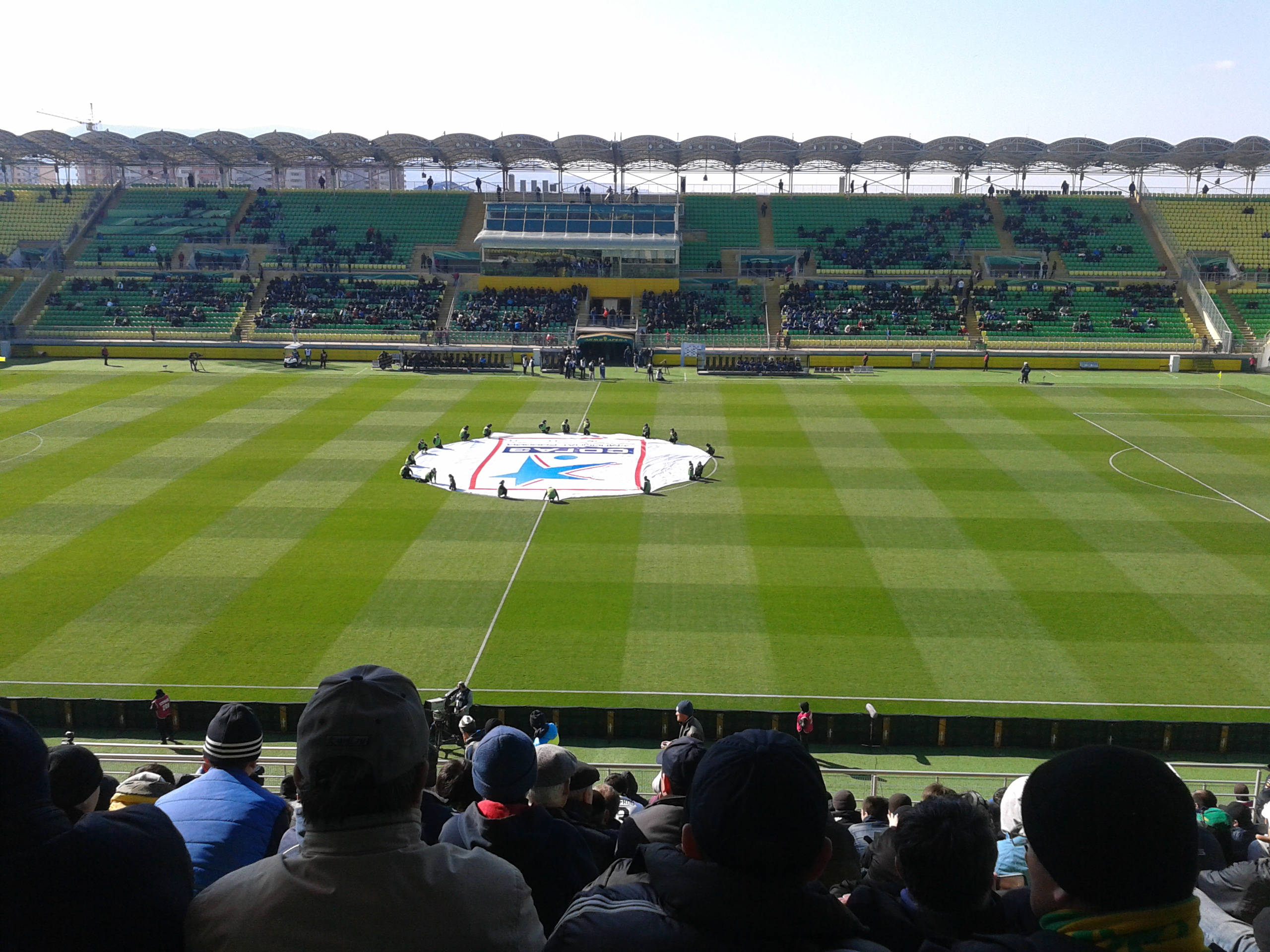
- Interactive map of Anzhi Arena (Anji Arena)
- Former names: Khazar Stadium (2003–2013)
- Location: Kaspiysk, Dagestan, Russia
- Coordinates: 42°54′28″N 47°37′06″E
- Owner: LLC Anzhi-Holding
- Operator: FC Dynamo Makhachkala
- Capacity: 26,500 (Russian Premier League)
- Surface: Grass
- Scoreboard: Yes
- Field size: 107m x 72m

Construction
- Built: 2001–2003
- Opened: 22 July 2003
- Renovated: 2011–2013

Tenants
- Anzhi Makhachkala (2003–2022); Dynamo Makhachkala (2022–present)

Anzhi Arena (Russian: «Анжи Арена») or Anji Arena is an all-seater football stadium in Kaspiysk, Dagestan, Russia, and was the home of Russian Premier League club Anzhi Makhachkala. The stadium was built on the site of Anzhi's former home, Khazar Stadium. It was opened after its renewal on 17 March 2013 and has a capacity of 26,500 spectators. It replaced Dynamo Stadium as the home of FC Anzhi. Since 2022 the stadium is used by FC Dynamo Makhachkala.

== History ==
Anzhi played their home games at the Dynamo Stadium in the center of the city of Makhachkala, but due to its small capacity, they decided to build a new stadium that could provide a bigger audience. The stadium was built in 2003 in Kaspiysk (10 km southeast from Makhachkala) due to small sources of land in the city of Makhachkala, the stadium was named Khazar. It was inaugurated on 22 July 2003. Later, Anzhi left the Khazar stadium and returned to play at their old Dynamo Stadium due to the difficulty of playing football under the strong winds blowing from the Caspian Sea.

== Opening ==
The arena was opened with a mini concert by Cher and Flo Rida. The concert was filmed but for legal reasons, Cher was not shown on Russian TV.

== Reconstruction ==
Since acquiring the club in 2011, Suleyman Kerimov planned on building a stadium that would include all UEFA Stadium Regulations, since Anzhi's home ground Dynamo Stadium was not permitted to host European matches. It was decided that Khazar stadium would be remodeled into a European level stadium, which upon completion will be called Anzhi Arena. The official opening after its renewal was held on 17 March 2013.
