= Budun Budunov =

Russian footballer

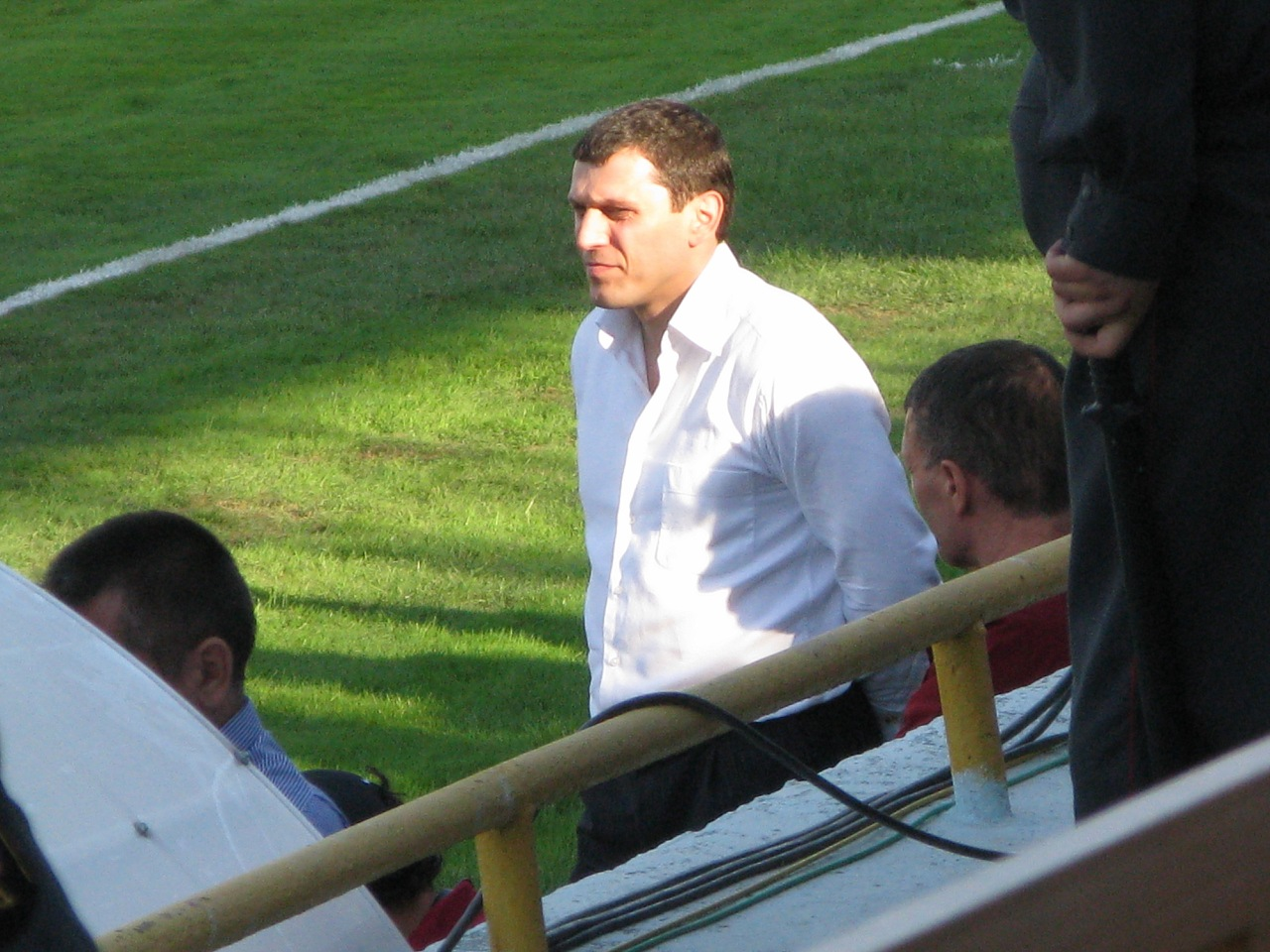

Personal information
- Full name: Budun Khachabekovich Budunov
- Date of birth: 4 December 1975 (age 50)
- Place of birth: Kizilyurt, Russian SFSR
- Height: 1.87 m (6 ft 2 in)
- Position: Striker

Senior career*
Years	Team	Apps	(Gls)
1994	FC Argo Kaspiysk	14	(2)
1995	FC Anzhi Makhachkala	4	(0)
1995–1996	FC Anzhi-2 Kaspiysk	34	(32)
1997–1998	FC Anzhi Makhachkala	9	(0)
1998	FC Lokomotiv-Taym Mineralnye Vody	16	(4)
1999–2003	FC Anzhi Makhachkala	143	(35)
2004–2005	FC Moscow	33	(6)
2005	FC Tom Tomsk	5	(1)
2006	FC Terek Grozny	19	(3)
2007	FC Anzhi Makhachkala	12	(2)
Total		289	(85)
- * Club domestic league appearances and goals

Budun Khachabekovich Budunov (Russian: Будун Хачабекович Будунов; born 4 December 1975) is a former Russian professional football player.

He currently works as the president of the Dagestan's Football Union.

== Honours ==
- Russian Cup finalist: 2001.
- Russian Third League Zone 1 top scorer: 1997 (35 goals).

== Death of Serhiy Perkhun ==
On 19 August 2001, during a game against CSKA Moscow, Budunov had a head on head collision with goalkeeper Serhiy Perkhun, who sustained serious head trauma during the collision and died 9 days later from a brain hemorrhage. Budunov himself suffered a serious concussion and was treated in intensive care.

== Personal life ==
His son Gadzhi Budunov plays football professionally.
