= Stanislav Khoteyev =

Russian footballer

Personal information
- Full name: Stanislav Aleksandrovich Khoteyev
- Date of birth: 7 March 1981 (age 45)
- Place of birth: Moscow, Russian SFSR
- Height: 1.91 m (6 ft 3 in)
- Position: Goalkeeper

Senior career*
Years	Team	Apps	(Gls)
1996–2000	FC Lokomotiv Moscow	0	(0)
1996–2000	→ FC Lokomotiv-d Moscow	50	(0)
2001–2002	FC Anzhi Makhachkala	0	(0)
2002–2003	FC Fakel Voronezh	2	(0)
2004	FC Izhevsk	15	(0)
2004	FC Elektronika Nizhny Novgorod	13	(0)
2005	FC Reutov	28	(0)
2006	FC Ryazan-Agrokomplekt Ryazan	4	(0)
2007	FC Lobnya-Alla Lobnya	8	(0)
2008–2009	FC Rostov	7	(0)
2010–2012	FC Shinnik Yaroslavl	3	(0)
- * Club domestic league appearances and goals

Stanislav Aleksandrovich Khoteyev (Russian: Станислав Александрович Хотеев; born 7 March 1981) is a former Russian professional footballer.

== Club career ==
He made his professional debut in the Russian Second Division in 1998 for the reserve team of FC Lokomotiv Moscow.

He played for the main team of FC Anzhi Makhachkala in a Russian Cup game.
