= Aleksandr Markarov =

Russian footballer and coach (born 1950)

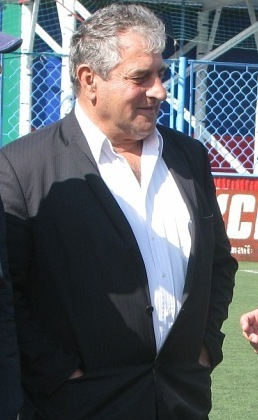

Personal information
- Full name: Aleksandr Ashotovich Markarov
- Date of birth: July 27, 1950 (age 76)
- Place of birth: Baku, Soviet Union
- Position: Forward

Senior career*
Years	Team	Apps	(Gls)
1969–1970	FC Polad Sumgait		
1971–1973	FC Dynamo Makhachkala	?	(40)
1976–1977	FC Dynamo Makhachkala	80	(47)
1981–1982	FC Dynamo Makhachkala	42	(21)
1992	FC Anzhi Makhachkala	13	(11)

Managerial career
- 1984: FC Dynamo Makhachkala
- 1995: FC Anzhi Makhachkala (caretaker)
- 2000–2001: FC Anzhi Makhachkala (assistant)
- 2001: FC Anzhi Makhachkala (caretaker)
- 2003: FC Anzhi Makhachkala (caretaker)
- 2004–2006: FC Krylia Sovetov Samara (assistant)
- 2006: FC Anzhi Makhachkala
- 2007: FC Anzhi Makhachkala (assistant)
- * Club domestic league appearances and goals

Aleksandr Ashotovich Markarov (Russian: Александр Ашотович Маркаров; born July 27, 1950) is a Russian professional football coach and a former player.
