= Denis Peremenin =

Russian footballer

Personal information
- Full name: Denis Vladimirovich Peremenin
- Date of birth: 4 January 1976 (age 50)
- Place of birth: Chelyabinsk, Russian SFSR
- Height: 1.82 m (5 ft 11 1/2 in)
- Position: Midfielder

Youth career
- Zenit-Signal Chelyabinsk

Senior career*
Years	Team	Apps	(Gls)
1993	FC Magnit Magnitogorsk		
1994	FC Alyansk Korkino		
1995–1996	FC Gornyak Kachkanar	15	(3)
1996–1998	FC UralAZ Miass	73	(13)
1998–1999	Köpetdag Aşgabat		
1999–2002	FC Anzhi Makhachkala	78	(0)
2002	FC Fakel-Voronezh Voronezh	8	(0)
2003	FC Dynamo-SPb St. Petersburg	21	(0)
2003	FC Priozyorsk-Dynamo Priozyorsk		
2003	FC Sodovik Sterlitamak	16	(0)
2004	FC LUKoil Chelyabinsk	17	(0)
2004	FC Lada Togliatti	8	(0)
2005–2006	FC Zenit Chelyabinsk	32	(1)
2008–2009	FC Shakhtyor Korkino		
- * Club domestic league appearances and goals

Denis Vladimirovich Peremenin (Russian: Денис Владимирович Переменин; born 4 January 1976) is a former Russian football player.

He represented Turkmenistan at the 1998 Asian Games, acquiring Turkmenistani citizenship for the occasion.

== Honours ==
Anzhi Makhachkala

- Russian Cup finalist: 2000–01
