= Ibragim Gasanbekov =

Soviet Azerbaijani footballer (1969-1999)

Personal information
- Full name: Ibragim Gasanbekovich Gasanbekov
- Date of birth: 25 October 1969
- Place of birth: Khasavyurt, Russian SFSR
- Date of death: 3 July 1999 (aged 29)
- Place of death: Makhachkala, Russia
- Height: 1.80 m (5 ft 11 in)
- Position: Forward

Senior career*
Years	Team	Apps	(Gls)
1991	Dynamo Makhachkala	38	(13)
1992–1999	Anzhi Makhachkala	236	(156)

International career
1996	Azerbaijan	2	(0)
- * Club domestic league appearances and goals

Ibragim Gasanbekovich Gasanbekov (Russian: Ибрагим Гасанбекович Гасанбеков; 25 October 1969 – 3 July 1999) was an Azerbaijani professional football player. He also held Russian citizenship.

== Death ==
He died when the car he was driving collided head-on with a Kamaz truck.

== Honours ==
Individual

- Russian Second League top scorer: 30 goals (Zone 1, 1993); 33 goals (Zone West, 1996).
