= Serhiy Dmytriyev =

Ukrainian footballer

Personal information
- Full name: Serhiy Oleksandrovych Dmytriyev
- Date of birth: 3 November 1978 (age 47)
- Height: 1.80 m (5 ft 11 in)
- Position: Defender

Senior career*
Years	Team	Apps	(Gls)
1996–1999	FC Shakhtar-2 Donetsk	55	(0)
1999	FC Anzhi Makhachkala	30	(0)
1999–2000	FC Shakhtar-2 Donetsk	10	(0)
2000–2001	FC Metalurh Donetsk	13	(0)
2001–2002	FC Anzhi Makhachkala	12	(0)
2003	FC SKA-Energiya Khabarovsk	1	(0)
2003–2005	FC Kryvbas Kryvyi Rih	45	(0)
2006	FC Olimpik Donetsk	15	(0)
2007–2008	FC Zorya Luhansk	3	(0)
- * Club domestic league appearances and goals

Serhiy Oleksandrovych Dmytriyev (Ukrainian: Сергій Олександрович Дмитрієв; born 3 November 1978) is a former Ukrainian football player.
