= Sergey Armishev =

Russian footballer

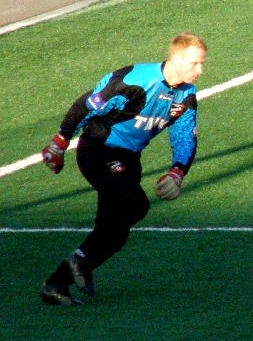

Personal information
- Full name: Sergey Nikolayevich Armishev
- Date of birth: 29 April 1976 (age 50)
- Place of birth: Perm, Russian SFSR
- Height: 1.88 m (6 ft 2 in)
- Position: Goalkeeper

Senior career*
Years	Team	Apps	(Gls)
1993–1995	Zvezda Perm	84	(0)
1996	Uralmash Yekaterinburg	28	(0)
1997	CSKA Moscow	5	(0)
1997	CSKA-d Moscow	19	(0)
1998	Uralan Elista	4	(0)
1999–2004	Anzhi Makhachkala	92	(0)
2005–2010	Ural Sverdlovsk Oblast	102	(0)

International career
1996–1997	Russia U-21	12	(0)
- * Club domestic league appearances and goals

Sergey Nikolayevich Armishev (Russian: Серге́й Николаевич Армишев; born 29 April 1976) is a Russian former football player who played goalkeeper.

== Honours ==
- Russian Cup finalist: 2001.
