= Nicolae Stanciu =

Nicolae Stanciu may refer to:

- Nicolae Stanciu (footballer, born 1973), Romanian footballer who spent most of his career playing for FC Rapid București
- Nicolae Stanciu (footballer, born 1993), Romanian footballer who plays for Genoa
