= Aleksandr Reshetnyak =

Russian footballer and coach

Personal information
- Full name: Aleksandr Petrovich Reshetnyak
- Date of birth: October 30, 1948 (age 77)
- Place of birth: Kaspiysk, USSR
- Position: Defender

Senior career*
Years	Team	Apps	(Gls)
1971–1978	Dynamo Makhachkala	84+	(6+)

Managerial career
- 1990–1991: Dynamo Makhachkala
- 1993–1994: Dynamo Makhachkala (assistant)
- 1995–1996: Anzhi-2 Kaspiysk
- 1997–1998: Anzhi Makhachkala (assistant)
- 1998: Anzhi Makhachkala (caretaker)
- 1999–2002: Anzhi Makhachkala (assistant)
- 2003: Anzhi Makhachkala (caretaker)
- 2004–2006: Anzhi Makhachkala (assistant)
- 2004: Anzhi Makhachkala (caretaker)
- 2006–2007: Dagdizel Kaspiysk (director)
- 2007: Anzhi Makhachkala (assistant)
- 2008–2009: Dagdizel Kaspiysk (director)
- * Club domestic league appearances and goals

Aleksandr Petrovich Reshetnyak (Russian: Александр Петрович Решетняк; born October 30, 1948) is a Russian professional football coach and a former player.
