= Andrei Gordeyev =

Russian footballer

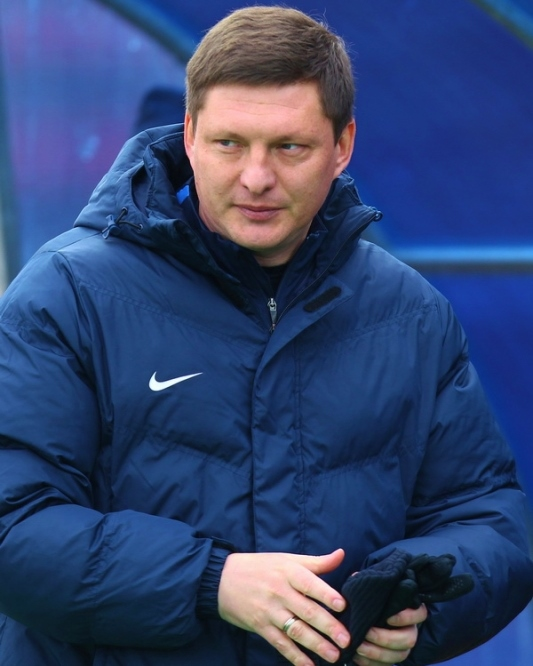
- Gordeyev managing Mordovia in 2015

Personal information
- Full name: Andrei Lvovich Gordeyev
- Date of birth: 1 April 1975 (age 51)
- Place of birth: Moscow, Russian SFSR
- Height: 1.83 m (6 ft 0 in)
- Position: Midfielder

Team information
- Current team: Torpedo Moscow (assistant coach)

Senior career*
Years	Team	Apps	(Gls)
1992	TRASKO Moscow	21	(1)
1993	SUO Moscow	40	(8)
1994–1995	Chertanovo Moscow	67	(14)
1996–1998	Dynamo Moscow	10	(1)
1999–2004	Anzhi Makhachkala	119	(3)
2005–2006	Fakel Voronezh	66	(1)
2007	Sportakademklub Moscow	20	(0)

Managerial career
- 2008–2009: Saturn Moscow Oblast (U-21)
- 2009–2011: Saturn Moscow Oblast
- 2011: Metalurh Donetsk
- 2011–2013: Anzhi Makhachkala (assistant)
- 2011: Anzhi Makhachkala (caretaker)
- 2014–2015: Sibir Novosibirsk
- 2015–2016: Mordovia Saransk
- 2017: SKA-Khabarovsk
- 2017–2018: Russia U-18
- 2018–2019: Russia U-19
- 2018–2019: Russia U-15
- 2019–2020: Urozhay Krasnodar
- 2020–2022: Forte Taganrog
- 2022: Torpedo Moscow (assistant)
- * Club domestic league appearances and goals

Andrei Lvovich Gordeyev (Russian: Андрей Львович Гордеев; born 1 April 1975) is a Russian professional football coach and a former player.

== Playing career ==
As a player, he made his debut in the Russian Premier League in 1996 for FC Dynamo Moscow.

== Coaching career ==
On 1 October 2019, he was appointed manager of third-tier PFL club Urozhay Krasnodar.

== Honours ==
- Russian Premier League bronze: 1997.
- Russian Cup finalist: 1999 (played in the early stages of the 1998–99 tournament for FC Dynamo Moscow), 2001.
