= Valery Shaveyko =

Russian association football player

Personal information
- Full name: Valery Ivanovich Shaveyko
- Date of birth: 4 February 1956 (age 70)
- Place of birth: Minsk, Belarusian SSR
- Height: 1.80 m (5 ft 11 in)
- Position: Defender

Youth career
- 1972–1973: Dinamo Minsk

Senior career*
Years	Team	Apps	(Gls)
1974–1980	Dinamo Minsk	155	(3)
1981–1987	Torpedo Moscow	139	(1)
1988	Pakhtakor Tashkent	2	(0)
1993	Metallurg Novotroitsk	12	(0)
1994	Lada Dimitrovgrad	26	(0)

Managerial career
- 1996: Nosta Novotroitsk
- * Club domestic league appearances and goals

Valery Ivanovich Shaveyko (Russian: Вале́рий Ива́нович Шаве́йко; born 4 February 1956) is a former Soviet football player, Master of Sports of the USSR (1979), Russian coach, referee, and inspector.

As a child, he played tennis, boxing, judo. In 10 years, won the society Dynamo championship on Greco-Roman wrestling at the age of 14 years. The pupil of the Minsk-5 Sports School, coach Leonid Lapunov. Since 1974, he was part of the FC Dinamo Minsk. Held for the team for seven seasons, he resigned from it after head coach Eduard Malofeev Shaveyko accused in the delivery of the home match with Neftçi PFK (0: 2).

In 1981, Shaveyko decided to go to Moscow FC Torpedo Moscow where he played the familiar Kruglov, Petrenko, Vassiliev, Prigoda. This was announced in Minsk, and Shaveyko as acting ensign, was ordered to come to the part. He still refused to play for Dynamo, for which he was disqualified for life with the reasoning "for grabbers attitude to football". Disqualification soon took off, and Shaveyko advocated the Torpedo until 1987. Winner of the USSR Cup 1986 Cup 1982 finalist spent two games in FC Pakhtakor in 1988, and later appeared in Poland (playing for the Northern Group of Forces football team in Soviet military championship) and in the Russian championship playing for FC Metallurg Novotroitsk and FC Lada Dimitrovgrad.

In 1996–2004, he worked as a football referee in the top flight, spending 48 matches. After conducting the November 7, 1999 match FC Lokomotiv (St. Petersburg) – FC Tyumen was banned for two years and had no right to judge the top division games.

In 2007, he was appointed Deputy Director FC FShM Torpedo Moscow. Since 2008 the inspector of football matches.
