= Stevo Glogovac =

Bosnian Serb footballer and manager (born 1973)

Personal information
- Full name: Stevan Glogovac
- Date of birth: January 9, 1973 (age 53)
- Place of birth: Bileća, SFR Yugoslavia
- Height: 1.82 m (5 ft 11 1/2 in)
- Position: Defender

Youth career
- 1990–1992: Hercegovac Bileća

Senior career*
| Years | Team | Apps | (Gls) |
| 1992–1997 | Zvezdara | 88 | (4) |
| 1997–1999 | Rad | 49 | (2) |
| 1999–2002 | Red Star Belgrade | 56 | (3) |
| 2002 | Anzhi Makhachkala | 17 | (0) |
| 2003–2006 | Zemun | 50 | (2) |
| 2006–2007 | Bežanija | 23 | (2) |
| 2007–2008 | Voždovac | 10 | (0) |

Managerial career
- 2009–2010: Palilulac Beograd
- * Club domestic league appearances and goals

Stevan "Stevo" Glogovac (Serbian Cyrillic: Стеван Стево Глоговац; born January 9, 1973) is a Bosnian Serb former football player and manager.

== Playing career ==
Born in Bileća, SR Bosnia and Herzegovina, he made his debut for local club FK Hercegovac Bileća in 1990. Due to the beginning of the Bosnian War, he moved to Serbia where he started playing in FK Zvezdara. In 1997, he moved to the First League of FR Yugoslavia club FK Rad where his good exhibitions made him make a move to the great 1991 European and World Champions Red Star Belgrade winning two Championships, in 1999–2000 and 2000–01 seasons, and two national Cups, in 2000 and 2002. In 2002, he went to Russia and played in Anzhi Makhachkala but, in January 2003, he was back to Serbia, this time to play FK Zemun. After two seasons there, he moved, in January 2006, to FK Bežanija. In summer 2007 he signed with another Belgrade based club FK Voždovac where he played his last season before retirement.

== Coaching career ==
He started coaching professionally Serbian League Belgrade club FK Palilulac Beograd in 2009, by the beginning of 2010 he has left club, due to many problems, both in squad and management.

== Personal life ==
Stevo's older brother Dragan was also a professional footballer.
