= Dynamo Stadium (Makhachkala) =

Football stadium in Dagestan, Russia

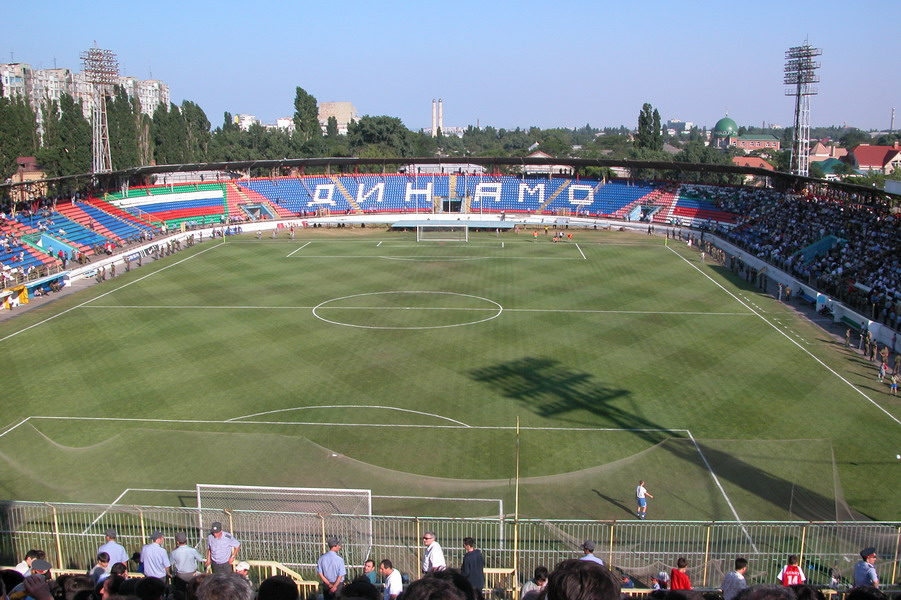
- Interactive map of Dynamo Stadium (Makhachkala)
- Full name: Dynamo Stadium
- Location: Makhachkala, Russia
- Coordinates: 42°58′N 47°30′E
- Owner: Dynamo Society
- Operator: FC Dynamo Makhachkala
- Capacity: 15,200
- Surface: Grass
- Field size: 105 m × 68 m (344 ft × 223 ft)

Construction
- Built: 1927
- Opened: 31 May 1927

Tenants
- FC Anzhi Makhachkala (1991-2013); FC Dynamo Makhachkala

Dynamo Stadium is a multi-purpose stadium. It is situated in Makhachkala, Russia. It is currently used mostly for football matches and is the home ground of FC Dynamo Makhachkala. The stadium holds 15,200 people and opened in 1927. It hosted Russian Premier League side Anzhi Makhachkala until they moved to the Anzhi-Arena in 2013.
