= Arsen Akayev =

Russian footballer and coach

Arsen Akayev Arsen Alini ulanı Aqay / Арсен Алини уланы Акъай
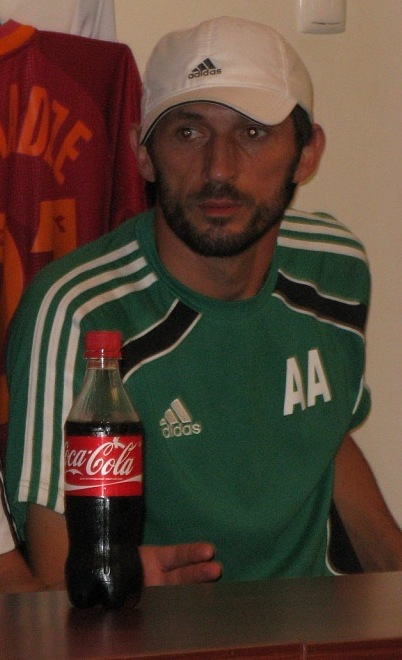

Personal information
- Full name: Arsen Aliyevich Akayev
- Date of birth: 28 December 1970 (age 55)
- Place of birth: Khasavyurt, Russian SFSR
- Height: 1.86 m (6 ft 1 in)
- Position: Defender

Team information
- Current team: FC Dynamo Makhachkala (assistant coach)

Senior career*
Years	Team	Apps	(Gls)
1993–1994	FC Dynamo Makhachkala	52	(5)
1994	FC Anzhi Makhachkala	9	(1)
1995	FC Dynamo Makhachkala	22	(4)
1998	FC Dynamo Makhachkala	33	(4)
1999–2003	FC Anzhi Makhachkala	103	(2)
2004	FC Vidnoye	16	(1)
2004–2006	FC Dynamo Makhachkala	67	(1)

Managerial career
- 2007: FC Dynamo Makhachkala (assistant)
- 2009–2016: FC Anzhi Makhachkala (assistant)
- 2010: FC Anzhi Makhachkala (caretaker)
- 2017: FC Anzhi-2 Makhachkala
- 2021–2023: FC Dynamo Makhachkala (assistant)
- * Club domestic league appearances and goals

Arsen Aliyevich Akayev (Russian: Арсен Алиевич Акаев, Kumyk: Arsen Alini ulanı Aqay; born 28 December 1970) is a Russian professional football coach and a former player.

== Club career ==
He played one game in the UEFA Cup 2001–02 for FC Anzhi Makhachkala

== Honours ==
- Russian Cup finalist: 2001.
