= Gadzhi Bamatov =

Russian footballer

Personal information
- Full name: Gadzhi Abidovich Bamatov
- Date of birth: 16 February 1982 (age 44)
- Place of birth: Makhachkala, Russian SFSR
- Height: 1.73 m (5 ft 8 in)
- Position: Forward

Senior career*
Years	Team	Apps	(Gls)
1997–2003	FC Anzhi Makhachkala	93	(15)
1997	→ FC Anzhi-2 Makhachkala (loan)	34	(21)
2003	→ FC Anzhi-Khazar Makhachkala (D4) (loan)		
2003	FC Fakel-Voronezh Voronezh	10	(3)
2004–2007	FC Anzhi Makhachkala	71	(9)
- * Club domestic league appearances and goals

Gadzhi Abidovich Bamatov (Russian: Гаджи Абидович Баматов; born 16 February 1982) is a former Russian football player.

He represented Russia at the 1999 UEFA European Under-16 Championship.
