= Amir Hamzić =

Bosnia and Herzegovina footballer

Personal information
- Date of birth: 5 January 1975 (age 51)
- Place of birth: Zvornik, SFR Yugoslavia
- Height: 1.85 m (6 ft 1 in)
- Position: Midfielder

Senior career*
Years	Team	Apps	(Gls)
1995–1999	Drina Zvornik		
1999–2000	Sloboda Tuzla		
2001–2002	Aarau	7	(0)
2002	Anzhi	4	(0)
2006–2012	Zvijezda	77+	(19+)
2012–2013	Gradina	11	(0)
2013–2014	Bosna		
- * Club domestic league appearances and goals

Amir Hamzić (born 5 January 1975) is a Bosnian-Herzegovinian retired football player.
