= Aleksei Selin =

Russian footballer

Personal information
- Full name: Aleksei Ivanovich Selin
- Date of birth: 6 February 1978 (age 48)
- Place of birth: Korenovsk, Krasnodar Krai, Russian SFSR
- Height: 1.72 m (5 ft 7 1/2 in)
- Position: Midfielder

Senior career*
Years	Team	Apps	(Gls)
1997	FC Rotor-2 Mikhaylovka	27	(4)
1998	FC Rotor-2 Volgograd	10	(0)
1999–2003	FC Kuban Krasnodar	135	(19)
2004	FC Chernomorets Novorossiysk	41	(10)
2005–2008	FC Nosta Novotroitsk	85	(7)
2009	FC Chernomorets Novorossiysk	4	(0)
- * Club domestic league appearances and goals

Aleksei Ivanovich Selin (Russian: Алексей Иванович Селин; born 6 February 1978) is a former Russian professional football player.

== Club career ==
He played 6 seasons in the Russian Football National League for FC Kuban Krasnodar, FC Chernomorets Novorossiysk and FC Nosta Novotroitsk.
