= Amel Mujčinović =

Bosnian-Herzegovinian footballer

Personal information
- Full name: Amel Mujčinović
- Date of birth: 20 November 1973 (age 52)
- Place of birth: Tuzla, SFR Yugoslavia
- Height: 1.86 m (6 ft 1 in)
- Position: Goalkeeper

Senior career*
Years	Team	Apps	(Gls)
1995–1996	Zmaj od Bosne	15	(0)
1996–2002	Publikum Celje	126	(0)
2002–2003	Anzhi Makhachkala	8	(0)
2003–2005	Mura	40	(0)
2005–2016	Celje	178	(0)
Total		367	(0)

International career
2001	Bosnia and Herzegovina	1	(0)
- * Club domestic league appearances and goals as of 18 March 2016

Amel Mujčinović (born 20 November 1973) is a retired Bosnian-Herzegovinian football goalkeeper.

== International career ==
He was capped once for Bosnia and Herzegovina, appearing as a second-half substitute for Adnan Gušo in a friendly match against Hungary in 2001.
