= Kakhaber Mzhavanadze =

Georgian footballer

Personal information
- Full name: Kakhaber Nodarovich Mzhavanadze
- Date of birth: 2 October 1978 (age 48)
- Place of birth: Kobuleti, Adjara, Georgia
- Height: 1.75 m (5 ft 9 in)
- Position: Defender

Youth career
- Kobuleti Sport School

Senior career*
Years	Team	Apps	(Gls)
1994–1996	Shukura Kobuleti	?	(?)
1997–2001	Dinamo Batumi	37	(1)
2000	→ Shukura Kobuleti (loan)	18	(2)
2001	Spartak Moscow	4	(0)
2002–2005	Anzhi	137	(3)
2006–2008	Chornomorets	22	(0)
2007	→ Anzhi (loan)	8	(0)
2008	→ Dnister (loan)	22	(0)
2009	Dacia Chişinău	8	(0)
2009–2011	Inter Baku	35	(1)
2015	Shukura Kobuleti	6	(0)

International career
2004–2006	Georgia	14	(0)
- * Club domestic league appearances and goals

Kakhaber Nodarovich Mzhavanadze (Georgian: კახაბერ ნოდარის ძე მჟავანაძე; born 2 October 1978) is a Georgian former football defender.

== Career ==
Kahaber over his career has played for Shukura Kobuleti, Dinamo Batumi, both in Georgia. In 2001, he moved to Russian giants Spartak Moscow, although appearing only 6 times for the club he was part of the league winning team that season. He moved to Anzhi the next season and had an extended spell with them. He joined FC Chornomorets Odesa, in January 2006. The defender was released on a free transfer by Chornomorets in January 2009, and had a trial with FC Rostov before eventually signing with FC Dacia Chişinău, who play in the Moldovan National Division.

== International ==
Mzhavanadze was also a member of Georgian National Football Team.
