= Ēriks Pelcis =

Latvian footballer (born 1978)

Personal information
- Date of birth: 25 June 1978 (age 48)
- Place of birth: Riga, USSR (now Republic of Latvia)
- Height: 1.80 m (5 ft 11 in)
- Position: Forward

Senior career*
Years	Team	Apps	(Gls)
1998–1999	Panerys Vilnius	15	(5)
1999	Žalgiris Vilnius	20	(10)
1999–2000	Anyang LG Cheetahs	23	(2)
2002	Anzhi Makhachkala	3	(1)
2003	Dinaburg Daugavpils	17	(4)
2003	Žalgiris Vilnius	7	(0)
2009–2011	FK Jelgava	9	(0)

International career
2000–2002	Latvia	5	(3)
- * Club domestic league appearances and goals

Ēriks Pelcis (born 25 June 1978) is a Latvian former footballer. He played for FC Seoul of the South Korean K-League, then known as Anyang LG Cheetahs.
