= Vladyslav Prudius =

Ukrainian-Russian footballer and coach

Personal information
- Full name: Vladyslav Mykolayovych Prudius
- Date of birth: 22 June 1973 (age 53)
- Place of birth: Romny, Ukrainian SSR
- Height: 1.75 m (5 ft 9 in)
- Position: Midfielder

Team information
- Current team: Academy Torpedo Moscow

Youth career
- KhOUOR-1 Kharkiv

Senior career*
Years	Team	Apps	(Gls)
1991–1992	FC Mayak/Olympic Kharkiv	68	(5)
1992–1993	FC Metalist Kharkiv	19	(3)
1993–1994	FC Dynamo Kyiv	14	(1)
1994	→ FC Dynamo-2 Kyiv	1	(0)
1994–1996	FC CSKA-Borysfen Boryspil	41	(4)
1996–2001	FC Rostselmash Rostov-on-Don	140	(6)
1996–2000	→ FC Rostselmash-2 Rostov-on-Don	29	(6)
2001	FC Lokomotiv Nizhny Novgorod	7	(1)
2002	FC Anzhi Makhachkala	23	(3)
2002	FC Bataysk (amateur)		
2003	FC Sokol Saratov	4	(0)
2003	FC Bataysk (amateur)		
2004	FC SKA Rostov-on-Don	9	(0)
2004	FC Vorskla Poltava	6	(0)
2005	FC Baltika Kaliningrad	14	(0)

International career
1993–1995	Ukraine-21	12	(1)
1993	Ukraine	3	(0)

Managerial career
- 2006: Academy FC Rostov
- 2011: FC Karelia Petrozavodsk (assistant)
- 2013–2014: FC Sever Murmansk (assistant)
- 2017–2020: Master-Saturn
- 2021–: Academy Torpedo Moscow
- * Club domestic league appearances and goals

Vladyslav Mykolayovych Prudius (Ukrainian: Владислав Миколайович Прудіус; Russian: Владислав Николаевич Прудиус; born 22 June 1973) is a Ukrainian professional football coach and a former player. He also holds Russian citizenship.

== Club career ==
He made his professional debut in the Soviet Second League B in 1991 for FC Mayak Kharkiv. He played 2 games in the 1999 UEFA Intertoto Cup for FC Rostselmash Rostov-on-Don.

== Honours ==
- Ukrainian Premier League champion: 1994.
