= 2003 Russian First Division =

Russian First Division
- Season: 2003
- Champions: Amkar Perm
- Promoted: Amkar Perm; Kuban Krasnodar
- Relegated: Dynamo St.Petersburg Expelled; Fakel Voronezh; Ural Sverdlovsk Oblast; Kristall Smolensk; Volgar Astrakhan; Lada-Togliatti
- Top goalscorer: Aleksandr Panov (23)

The 2003 Russian First Division was the 12th edition of Russian First Division. There were 22 teams.

== Teams ==
Location of teams in 2003 Russian First Division

Team	Place
Amkar Perm	Perm
Anzhi Makhachkala	Makhachkala
Baltika Kaliningrad	Kaliningrad
Dynamo St.Petersburg	Saint Petersburg
Fakel Voronezh	Voronezh
SOYUZ-Gazprom Izhevsk	Izhevsk
Khimki	Khimki
Kuban Krasnodar	Krasnodar
Lada-Togliatti	Tolyatti
Lokomotiv Chita	Chita
Metallurg Lipetsk	Lipetsk

Team	Place
Metallurg Novokuznetsk	Novokuznetsk
Lisma-Mordovia Saransk	Saransk
Neftekhimik Nizhnekamsk	Nizhnekamsk
SKA-Energiya Khabarovsk	Khabarovsk
Kristall Smolensk	Smolensk
Sokol Saratov	Saratov
Spartak Nalchik	Nalchik
Terek Grozny	Grozny
Tom Tomsk	Tomsk
Ural Sverdlovsk Oblast	Yekaterinburg
Volgar Astrakhan	Astrakhan

== Standings ==
Pos	Team	Pld	W	D	L	GF	GA	GD	Pts	Promotion or relegation
1	Amkar Perm (P)	42	25	12	5	50	20	+30	87	Promotion to Premier League
2	Kuban Krasnodar (P)	42	27	5	10	75	38	+37	86	Promotion to Premier League
3	Tom Tomsk	42	25	10	7	55	23	+32	85 (Note: Head-to-head record: Tom – Terek 2–1, Terek – Tom 0–1.)	
4	Terek Grozny	42	25	10	7	56	21	+35	85	Qualification to UEFA Cup second qualifying round (Note: Qualified as 2003–04 Russian Cup winners.)
5	Dynamo St. Petersburg (R)	42	23	8	11	66	37	+29	77	Relegation to Second Division (Note: Dynamo Saint Petersburg were expelled from the league due to financial irregularities)
6	Anzhi Makhachkala	42	19	13	10	52	33	+19	70	
7	Baltika Kaliningrad	42	18	10	14	58	49	+9	64	
8	Metallurg Lipetsk	42	17	11	14	53	38	+15	62	
9	Sokol Saratov	42	16	14	12	52	36	+16	62	
10	SKA-Khabarovsk	42	16	12	14	51	47	+4	60	
11	Lokomotiv Chita	42	19	0	23	55	66	−11	57	
12	Khimki	42	16	9	17	36	46	−10	57	
13	Metallurg-Kuzbass Novokuznetsk	42	14	12	16	42	47	−5	54	
14	Lisma-Mordovia Saransk	42	15	8	19	54	60	−6	53	
15	Spartak Nalchik	42	14	10	18	34	49	−15	52	
16	Neftekhimik Nizhnekamsk	42	14	9	19	50	60	−10	51	
17	SOYUZ-Gazprom Izhevsk	42	12	14	16	44	56	−12	50	
18	Fakel Voronezh (R)	42	13	10	19	44	56	−12	49	Relegation to Second Division
19	Ural Sverdlovsk Oblast (R)	42	11	8	23	43	65	−22	41	Relegation to Second Division
20	Kristall Smolensk (R)	42	10	5	27	40	72	−32	35	Relegation to Second Division
21	Volgar-Gazprom Astrakhan (R)	42	6	11	25	28	60	−32	29	Relegation to Second Division
22	Lada-Togliatti (R)	42	5	3	34	27	86	−59	18	Relegation to Second Division

Source: PFL, RSSSF
Rules for classification: 1st points; 2nd matches won; 3rd head-to-head (points, matches won, goal difference, goals scored, away goals scored); 4th goal difference; 5th goals scored; 6th away goals scored
(P) Promoted; (R) Relegated

== Results ==
Home \ Away	AMK	ANZ	BAL	DSP	FAK	KHI	KRI	KUB	LAD	LCH	MTL	MTK	MOR	NEF	SKA	SOK	SGI	SPN	TER	TOM	URA	VOL
Amkar Perm		0–0	3–0	2–1	2–0	1–0	3–0	1–0	1–0	3–1	2–1	1–1	1–1	2–0	0–0	1–0	2–1	1–0	0–0	0–2	2–0	1–0
Anzhi Makhachkala	1–1		1–0	0–0	3–1	3–0	3–1	1–0	6–0	3–1	0–0	2–1	2–0	5–3	1–1	2–0	1–0	2–1	0–1	1–0	1–1	3–0
Baltika Kaliningrad	1–0	2–3		2–1	1–2	3–1	2–1	4–3	1–0	1–2	0–0	0–0	4–0	1–2	2–4	3–2	1–0	2–0	2–1	1–1	2–1	0–0
Dynamo St. Petersburg	1–1	2–0	0–1		2–1	3–0	1–1	3–1	2–0	6–0	1–0	3–0	1–0	0–2	3–1	4–2	2–0	2–0	0–0	1–2	3–0	1–1
Fakel Voronezh	0–0	3–1	3–2	2–2		2–1	1–0	3–4	2–2	2–0	2–1	0–2	2–0	1–0	0–1	2–1	0–3	0–1	1–1	1–0	3–1	1–1
Khimki	1–4	0–0	1–1	1–2	1–0		0–0	1–1	1–0	1–0	1–0	1–1	1–0	1–0	0–1	0–3	0–0	2–1	3–2	1–1	2–1	1–0
Kristall Smolensk	0–2	0–0	1–2	0–1	0–0	0–3		1–3	1–0	3–1	2–1	2–0	1–0	0–2	3–2	2–4	1–0	0–1	0–2	2–0	7–4	2–0
Kuban Krasnodar	0–1	1–0	0–1	3–1	4–0	3–1	3–0		3–1	2–1	3–0	3–0	2–0	1–0	1–1	0–0	1–0	3–1	0–0	0–0	4–1	1–0
Lada-Togliatti	0–2	0–0	0–3	0–1	2–1	1–2	4–1	0–2		1–2	0–0	0–2	1–2	1–2	0–3	0–2	1–2	0–2	0–7	1–0	3–1	0–2
Lokomotiv Chita	0–1	2–1	2–1	2–0	2–1	0–2	2–0	1–2	2–0		2–1	2–0	3–1	4–2	3–1	0–1	3–1	1–2	0–1	3–2	1–0	2–1
Metallurg Lipetsk	0–1	2–1	1–1	4–2	1–0	2–0	2–1	3–2	2–3	1–0		0–3	2–0	1–0	1–0	0–0	5–0	3–0	1–2	0–1	5–0	4–1
Metallurg-Kuzbass	2–0	2–0	1–0	1–3	1–1	0–1	2–0	0–2	4–2	1–0	1–3		1–1	0–0	2–1	2–2	0–0	3–0	0–1	2–0	3–2	1–1
Lisma-Mordovia Saransk	0–0	0–0	3–2	1–3	4–0	2–0	2–1	1–0	4–0	1–0	0–1	0–1		3–2	2–3	2–1	1–1	4–0	1–1	1–3	2–1	3–1
Neftekhimik Nizhnekamsk	1–1	0–1	3–1	0–1	1–1	1–1	1–0	1–4	3–1	2–1	2–1	2–0	2–3		2–1	2–2	1–1	2–2	0–1	0–2	0–0	4–1
SKA-Khabarovsk	1–1	0–1	1–2	0–0	1–0	2–1	2–1	1–2	2–0	0–1	1–1	3–1	2–2	1–0		1–0	1–1	2–0	1–2	1–1	2–0	1–0
Sokol Saratov	0–0	1–3	0–0	0–2	1–0	1–0	3–0	3–0	2–1	2–1	0–0	1–0	3–0	0–0	1–0		1–1	0–0	1–0	0–0	0–0	4–1
SOYUZ-Gazprom Izhevsk	0–1	0–0	0–0	1–0	2–1	2–1	4–3	2–3	3–1	6–3	0–0	1–0	1–1	2–0	0–0	1–6		1–0	1–1	1–2	0–1	2–2
Spartak Nalchik	0–1	2–0	0–4	1–0	1–1	0–0	0–0	1–2	1–0	1–0	1–1	1–1	2–1	2–0	1–1	1–1	4–0		0–1	0–0	2–1	1–0
Terek Grozny	2–0	0–0	1–0	2–3	1–0	1–0	1–0	0–1	1–0	2–0	1–1	2–0	1–0	5–1	3–1	1–0	2–0	2–0		0–1	2–0	0–0
Tom Tomsk	0–1	2–0	2–0	0–0	1–0	1–0	2–0	2–0	1–0	3–1	0–0	3–0	3–0	3–0	1–1	2–1	1–0	3–0	2–1		1–0	2–1
Ural Sverdlovsk Oblast	1–0	0–0	2–2	2–1	0–2	0–1	3–0	0–2	3–1	4–1	1–0	0–0	3–2	0–1	4–1	0–0	2–3	1–0	0–0	0–1		0–2
Volgar-Gazprom	1–3	2–0	0–0	0–1	1–1	0–1	3–2	0–3	2–0	0–2	0–1	0–0	1–3	1–3	0–1	1–0	0–0	0–1	0–1	1–1	0–2	

Source: PFL (in Russian)
Legend: Blue = home team win; Yellow = draw; Red = away team win.

== Top goalscorers ==
Rank	Player	Team	Goals
1	(Russia) Aleksandr Panov	Dynamo (SPb)	23
2	(Russia) Konstantin Paramonov	Amkar	21
2	(Russia) Aleksandr Petukhov	Metallurg (L)	21
4	(Russia) Oleg Veretennikov	Lisma-Mordovia	18
5	(Russia) Aleksandr Antipenko	Kristall / Khimki	17
5	(Russia) Andrey Dementyev	Baltika	17
7	(Russia) Andrei Fedkov	Sokol	16
8	(Russia) Denis Kiselyov	Khimki	15
8	(Russia) Pavel Pogrebnyak	Baltika	15
10	(Russia) Oleg Lidrik	Metallurg-Kuzbass	14
10	(Russia) Andrei Salnikov	Ural	14

== See also ==
- 2003 Russian Premier League
