= FC Lokomotiv-KMV Mineralnye Vody =

- Full name: Football Club Lokomotiv-KMV Mineralnye Vody
- Founded: 1986
- Dissolved: 2009
- League: Amateur Football League, Zone South
- 2008: 7th

FC Lokomotiv-KMV Mineralnye Vody (Russian: «Локомотив‑КМВ» (Минеральные Воды)) was a Russian football team from Mineralnye Vody. It played professionally in 1986–1992, 1994–1998 and 2001. Their best result was 3rd place in the South Zone of the Russian Second Division in 2001.

== Team name history ==
- 1986–1997: FC Lokomotiv Mineralnye Vody
- 1998–2003: FC Lokomotiv-Taym Mineralnye Vody
- 2004–2005: FC Zheleznodorozhnik Mineralnye Vody
- 2006–2008: FC Lokomotiv-KMV Mineralnye Vody
