= FC Anzhi Makhachkala =

Association football club in Russia

Anzhi Makhachkala
- Full name: Футбольный клуб «Анжи» Махачкала
- Nicknames: Orly (Eagles); Zhelto-zelyonye (Yellow-Greens)
- Founded: 1991; 35 years ago
- Ground: Anzhi Arena
- Capacity: 26,500
- Owner: Osman Kadiev
- League: Russian Second League; Division A Gold Group
- 2025 Russian III division: 1st in Group «South» (SKFO) overall table, quarter-finals in YuFO/SKFO promotion play-offs
- Website: fc-anji.ru
Home colours	Away colours	Third colours

Football Club Anzhi Makhachkala (Russian: Футбо́льный клуб «Анжи́» Махачкала́, pronounced [fʊdˈbolʲnɨj ˈklup ɐnˈʐɨ məxətɕkɐˈla]), known simply as FC Anji, is a Russian semi-professional football club based in the Dagestani capital of Makhachkala. Founded in 1991, the club now competes in the fifth-tier of Russian Football, the Russian Amateur Football League.

In January 2011, Anzhi Makhachkala was purchased by billionaire Suleyman Kerimov, and subsequently made numerous high-profile signings, including those of striker Samuel Eto'o and defender Roberto Carlos. Following severe budget cuts ahead of the 2013–14 Russian Premier League season, the club lost most of its key players and went on to finish bottom of the table, which resulted in relegation to the Russian National Football League at the end of the season.

== History ==
The club was founded in 1991 by former Dinamo Makhachkala player Aleksandr Markarov with the head of Dagnefteprodukt – Magomed-Sultan Magomedov and took part in its first season in the Dagestan League the same year. The club's name Anzhi means pearl in local Kumyk language and is a former name of Makhachkala. FC Anzhi ended up as league champions with an unbeaten record and 16 wins out of 20 matches.

Due to the dissolution of the Soviet Union, the club entered Zone 1 of the Russian Second Division (the third-highest tier) in 1992 and finished in fifth place. The club won their Group in 1993, but due to league reorganisation were not promoted, and remained in the new Western Zone of the third tier until a second-place finish in 1996 guaranteed promotion to the First Division, under the coaching of Eduard Malofeev. A key player in Anzhi's early history was Azerbaijani international forward Ibragim Gasanbekov, who was the team's top scorer in all of their first seven seasons. He was the league's top scorer in 1993 (30 goals) and 1996 (33 goals).

In 1999, Anzhi won the First Division, and were thus promoted to the top-flight Premier League for the first time. The side missed out on a bronze-medal finish on the last day of the season, as they conceded a last-minute Torpedo Moscow penalty which took their opponents into third place. On 20 June 2001, the club played in the final of the Russian Cup for the first time, losing to Lokomotiv Moscow on penalties after a 1–1 draw.

Anzhi finished 15th and were relegated from the Premier League in 2002, but during their first season back in the First Division, they reached the semi-finals of the Russian Cup, where they lost 1–0 to Rostov. In their seventh season in the First Division, Anzhi won the league and returned to the Premier League. On 5 December 2010, defender Shamil Burziyev died in a car accident at the age of 25.

=== Purchase ===
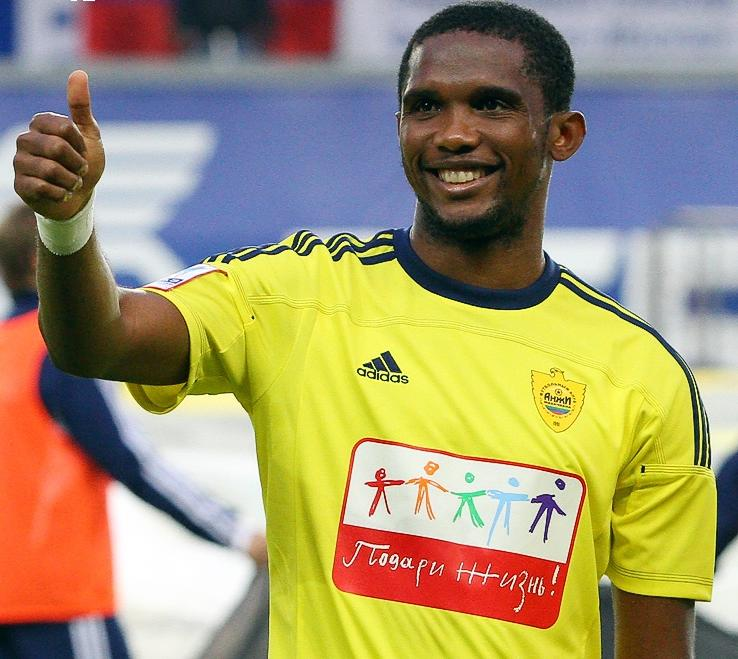
Cameroonian striker Samuel Eto'o was the team's captain until his departure to Chelsea in 2013

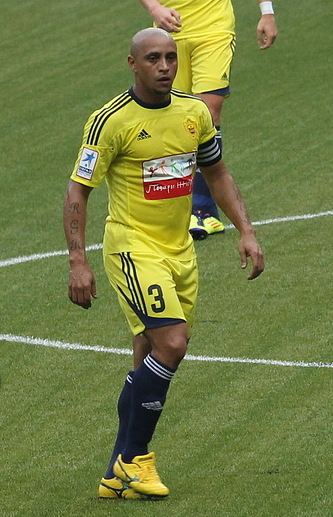
Roberto Carlos with Anzhi in 2011

On 18 January 2011, the club was purchased by Dagestani billionaire Suleyman Kerimov, but later it was revealed that the President of Dagestan, Magomedsalam Magomedov, met Kerimov and gave him a 100% stake in the club, including 50% of the shares of the former owner of the club Igor Yakovlev, in exchange for financial support. Kerimov was planning to invest over $200 million in infrastructure, of which a substantial amount would go into building a new stadium with a capacity of more than 40,000 spectators, which would meet all UEFA requirements.

Kerimov's investment was immediate as the club made many signings in the 2011 winter transfer window. The first significant signing came on 16 February, when the club announced the free transfer of Brazilian left-back and 2002 FIFA World Cup winner Roberto Carlos from Corinthians. Further signings included Roberto Carlos's teammate at Corinthians, midfielder Jucilei, who was bought for €10 million, Atletico Mineiro forward Diego Tardelli, who signed on a four-year contract, and Moroccan winger Mbark Boussoufa from Anderlecht. Anzhi paid €8 million for Boussoufa, and his transfer was finalised in the last minute of the window, on 10 March.

In summer 2011, the club signed Hungarian winger Balázs Dzsudzsák, who signed a four-year deal for a reported €14 million. Anzhi also bought Russian midfielder Yuri Zhirkov from Chelsea for a similar fee. On 23 August, Cameroonian striker Samuel Eto'o signed from Inter Milan for approximately €21 million on a world-record €20.5 million annual salary. The deal included a three-year contract. On 30 August, Anzhi made their last big summer transfer window signing, with the arrival of Mehdi Carcela.

In September 2011, Gadzhi Gadzhiyev was sacked, after managing only one win in the last six matches, leaving the club seventh in the league table. Roberto Carlos took on a player-manager role, along with assistant Andrei Gordeyev. On 27 December 2011, the club appointed Yuri Krasnozhan as the new coach. However, he was sacked after only two months, and the team didn't play any official games under his management. In February 2012, experienced Dutchman Guus Hiddink was announced as his replacement. Hiddink's first signing was Congolese defender Christopher Samba, joining for £12 million from Blackburn Rovers on 24 February.

On 30 January 2012, Roberto Carlos announced his plans to retire at the end of the season, despite his contract running until June 2013. He ended his football career on 1 August and took up a role as the club's director. The Russian club concluded the first season after the takeover, the 2011–12 season, with a fifth-place finish in the league, which qualified the club for the Europa League second qualifying round. In the Russian Cup, the club was eliminated in the round of 16 with an extra time loss against Dynamo Moscow.

On 3 September 2012, the club signed Lassana Diarra on a four-year deal. On 10 October, Anzhi opened a youth academy, the first in Dagestan, in order to develop youth talents for the first team. The academy is being run by Anzhi Sporting Director Jelle Goes. On 2 February 2013, Willian joined the club from Shakhtar Donetsk for a €35 million fee.

Anzhi finished the 2012–13 season in third place in the league table, missing out on qualification for the next season's Champions League. Anzhi began the campaign in great form, losing only once in their first 12 matches and even holding the top spot four times. However, they suffered a downturn in form after the new year, winning only three times in their final twelve matches, including a 4–0 defeat against Krasnodar in March. In the Europa League, they finished second in their group, and were eliminated in the round of 16 by Newcastle United with a last minute goal after beating Hannover 96 in the round of 32. They reached the Russian Cup final that season, losing to CSKA on penalties.

On 22 July 2013, Hiddink resigned from his post as manager, ending an 18-month stint. His newly appointed assistant, countryman René Meulensteen, was promoted to the manager position. However, after 16 days as the team manager, Meulensteen was sacked.

=== Budget cuts ===
On 7 August 2013, Kerimov decided to reduce the team's annual budget by two-thirds. As a result, on 15 August 2013, Yuri Zhirkov, Igor Denisov, and Aleksandr Kokorin were packaged to Dynamo Moscow for an undisclosed fee. The three players had been purchased within the preceding two seasons, at a total cost exceeding €50 million. Remchukov said that the reason for the move was the "sharp deterioration in the health of Suleyman Kerimov, because of worries about the club's lack of success". In addition, Dynamo also signed Christopher Samba, Vladimir Gabulov and Aleksei Ionov from Anzhi. Other cost-cutting transfers included Samuel Eto'o and Willian to English side Chelsea; Lassana Diarra, Mbark Boussoufa and Arseniy Logashov to Lokomotiv Moscow; João Carlos to Spartak Moscow; and Oleg Shatov to Zenit Saint Petersburg. The firesale continued into January 2014 with the sale of striker Lacina Traoré to Monaco for €18 million and the sale of midfielder Jucilei to Emirati side Al-Jazira.

Several of the players sold had been recent signings for Anzhi; Aleksandr Kokorin had signed from Dynamo only a month before being sold back to the Dinamiki and had yet to make an appearance for Anzhi. Igor Denisov and Aleksei Ionov had both signed only in June and had played only a handful of matches before being sold. Christopher Samba had rejoined Anzhi in July after a spell with Queens Park Rangers. Willian had joined in January and played only 11 league matches before being sold.

The budget cuts and subsequent sales resulted in Anzhi performing very poorly in the 2013–14 Russian Premier League: they finished last and were relegated, having amassed a record low of three wins and 20 points, making them the worst last-placed team in Europe. However, they returned to the top division at the first attempt.

Although they were relegated, the club still managed to get into the last 16 of the Europa League, being eliminated by AZ Alkmaar.

=== Last years as a professional football club ===
Yuri Semin was announced as Anzhi's manager on 18 June 2015, signing a one-year contract with the option of an additional year. After gaining only 6 points in first 10 games of the 2015–16 season and with Anzhi in last place, Semin left Anzhi on 29 September 2015. After Semin's departure, Ruslan Agalarov was placed in charge of the club, until the end of the season, saving them from relegation with a play-off victory over Volgar Astrakhan.

Pavel Vrba was appointed as the club's new manager on 30 June 2016, following the expiration of Ruslan Agalarov's contract on 31 May 2016. On 28 December 2016, Suleyman Kerimov sold the club to Osman Kadiyev, with Pavel Vrba leaving by mutual consent two days later, with Aleksandr Grigoryan being appointed as the club's new manager on 5 January 2017.

Anzhi was relegated from the Russian Premier League once again at the end of the 2017–18 season, losing the relegation playoffs to FC Yenisey Krasnoyarsk with an aggregate score of 4–6. On 13 June 2018, FC Amkar Perm announced that the Russian Football Union recalled their 2018–19 season license, making them ineligible for the Russian Premier League or Russian Football National League. As a consequence, Anzhi took Amkar's spot and was not relegated.

Anzhi struggled again during the 2018–19 season, and following a 0–1 defeat to Arsenal Tula, their relegation back to the Russian Football National League was confirmed.

On 15 May 2019, club's general director Absalutdin Agaragimov announced that the club failed Russian Football Union licensing for the 2019–20 season. The club had until the end of May to lodge an appeal. On 29 May 2019, Russian Football Union licensing department chief Yevgeni Letin announced that Anzhi has recalled their appeal and, as a result, will not compete in the second-tier Russian Football National League in the 2019–20 season. They had an option of applying for the third-tier Russian Professional Football League license or potentially declaring bankruptcy. On 26 June 2019, Anzhi confirmed that they had received a license to play in the Russian Professional Football League for the 2019–20 season, and that they were still unable to register new players due to outstanding debts. Their 2019–20 squad mostly included the under-20 players who played for their youth team in the previous season, with most first-team players moving to other professional teams, including several notable ones (Yury Dyupin, Vladislav Kulik, Andrés Ponce) who remained in the Russian Premier League.

On 3 June 2022, the Russian Football Union confirmed their decision to not grant Anzhi the license that is necessary to play in the FNL 2. Their appeal was not considered as it was not filed according to the procedure. That automatically meant the loss of professional status. The club issued a statement apologizing to the fans and stating hope that the club can come back "one day". The last game of the FNL2 season and the last professional Anzhi game was played on 5 June 2022, Anzhi won 4–0 away against FC Rotor-2 Volgograd. Another club based in Makhachkala, FC Dynamo Makhachkala, secured promotion to the FNL 3 days prior to that.

=== Return to Russian football as a semi-professional club ===
On 1st September 2024, FC Anzhi Makhachkala's social media accounts announced that Osman Kadiev reached a deal with MFC «South United», a Media football team, to allow the latter team to use Anzhi's brand as well as extend these rights to a group of Anzhi's football ultras known as the 'Wild Brigade' who would help with the 'resurgence of FC Anzhi in the amateur Dagestani football league'. Next year on January 28th, Anzhi's telegram channel posted the announcement that Anzhi will enter the Russian III division. In their first season in the III division, Anzhi reached 1st in the SKFO group overall table but only managed to reach the quarter-finals of the playoffs as they were defeated at home in the second-leg on penalties by FC Spartak Anapa (1:1, 3-4).

== Crest and colours ==
Anzhi badge from 2007 to 2009. The club returned to the original in 2010.

The club's crest includes a yellow eagle in traditional Caucasian clothing with elements of the Dagestani flag.

The club's name derives from the word Anzhi which means "pearl" in the Kumyk language. It was also the ancient name for the land around where Makhachkala is situated.

In the 2013–14 season, they changed their kit sponsor from Adidas to Nike.

Year	Kit manufacturer
2011–2013	Adidas
2013–2018	Nike
2018–2021	Jako
2021–2022	Puma

== Stadium ==
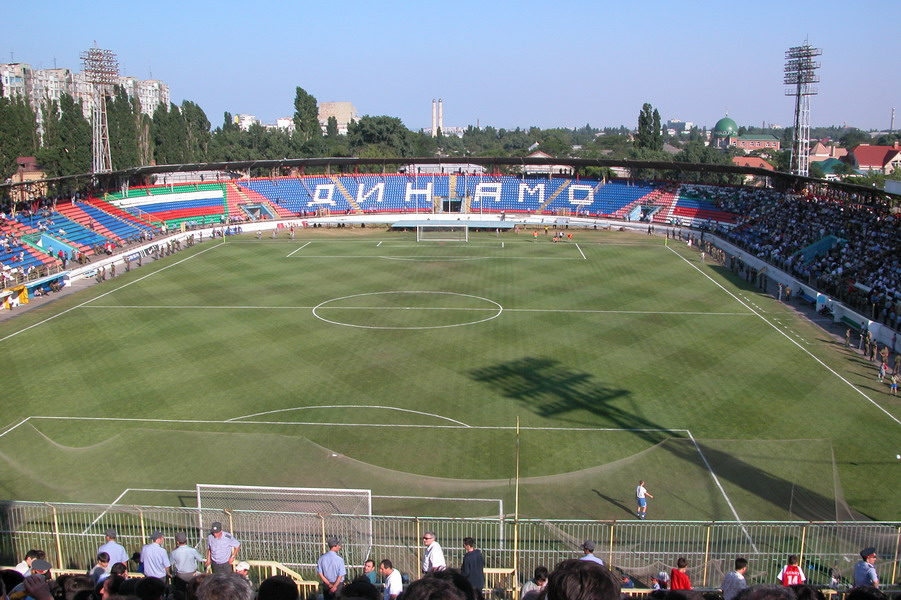
Anzhi played at the Dynamo Stadium until 2013.

Due to the risk of possible armed conflict in Dagestan, the club's players primarily live and train at a training base near Moscow, which was previously used by Saturn Moscow. The club fly in for home matches, which have a heavy security presence.

The club's 28,000-seat Anzhi Arena was built in 2003, and due to its facilities is not used in European competition, for which Anzhi use the Lokomotiv Stadium in Moscow. A high-priority goal of Kerimov when he purchased the club was the construction of a new 40,000 seater ground.

== Supporters ==
Anzhi receive most of their support from the Northern Caucasian region, particularly from the city of Makhachkala. The club also enjoys support from fans scattered all over Dagestan, and the local area in general. The club is hated by some supporters of the Moscow-based clubs as well as Zenit Saint Petersburg, in part out of jealousy of the club's former wealth and also out of ethnic and religious animosity.

== European competitions ==
Anzhi's first continental participation was in the 2001–02 UEFA Cup. Their opponents were Rangers of Scotland. Instead of usual home-and-away fixtures, UEFA decided to hold a single match in a neutral venue—the Polish Army Stadium in Warsaw—due to the unstable situation in neighbouring Chechnya. Rangers won the match 1–0 and eliminated Anzhi.

After finishing fifth in the 2011–12 Russian Premier League, Anzhi qualified for the group stage of the UEFA Europa League for the first time in the club's history, after eliminating Budapest Honvéd in the second qualifying round, Vitesse in the third qualifying round and AZ Alkmaar in the play-off round. However, they again had to play home matches away, this time at the Luzhniki Stadium, due to unrest in the city of Makhachkala. They finished second in group A behind Liverpool; both games between the two ended as 1–0 home wins. Liverpool, Anzhi and Young Boys took the top three positions in the group respectively with ten points each, and were ranked by their head-to-head record with fourth-placed Udinese; Anzhi were the only team in the group not to lose at home, having won all their home games in the group stage. Guus Hiddink's team were drawn with German side Hannover 96, who won group L. The Russians won the first leg 3–1 at the Luzhniki before a 1–1 draw in Hanover sent them through 4–2 on aggregate. They then faced Newcastle United in the next round, where Alan Pardew's men became the first team to deny Anzhi a home win in European competition. In the second leg away at St James' Park, Newcastle's Papiss Cissé headed home the winner in the last second to eliminate Anzhi; Mehdi Carcela-González had earlier been sent off for the club.

=== Record ===
As of match played 20 March 2014

Competition	Pld	W	D	L	GF	GA
UEFA Cup	1	0	0	1	0	1
UEFA Europa League	26	13	7	6	32	16
Total	27	13	7	7	32	17

1R: First round, 2Q: Second qualifying round, 3Q: Third qualifying round, PO: Play-off round

Season	Competition	Round	Club	Home	Away	Aggregate
2001–02	UEFA Cup	1R	(Scotland) Rangers	0–1^{1}		
2012–13	UEFA Europa League	2Q	(Hungary) Budapest Honvéd	1–0	4–0	5–0
2012–13	UEFA Europa League	3Q	(Netherlands) Vitesse	2–0	2–0	4–0
2012–13	UEFA Europa League	PO	(Netherlands) AZ	1–0	5–0	6–0
2012–13	UEFA Europa League	Group A	(England) Liverpool	1–0	0–1	2nd
2012–13	UEFA Europa League	Group A	(Italy) Udinese	2–0	1–1	2nd
2012–13	UEFA Europa League	Group A	(Switzerland) Young Boys	2–0	1–3	2nd
2012–13	UEFA Europa League	Round of 32	(Germany) Hannover 96	3–1	1–1	4–2
2012–13	UEFA Europa League	Round of 16	(England) Newcastle United	0–0	0–1	0–1
2013–14	UEFA Europa League	Group K	(England) Tottenham Hotspur	0–2	1–4	2nd
2013–14	UEFA Europa League	Group K	(Moldova) Sheriff Tiraspol	1–1	0–0	2nd
2013–14	UEFA Europa League	Group K	(Norway) Tromsø	1–0	1–0	2nd
2013–14	UEFA Europa League	Round of 32	(Belgium) Genk	0–0	2–0	2–0
2013–14	UEFA Europa League	Round of 16	(Netherlands) AZ	0–0	0–1	0–1

Notes

^{1} Only one leg was played, in a neutral venue in Warsaw, Poland, due to security concerns in Russia.

== Honours ==
- Russian National League

Champions (2): 1999, 2009

== Recent seasons ==
=== Russia ===
Season	Div.	Pos.	Pl.	W	D	L	GS	GA	P	Cup	Europe		Top scorer (League)
1992	3rd, Zone 1	5	38	23	2	13	77	46	48	–	–		(Azerbaijan) (Russia) Gasanbekov – 14
1993	3rd, Zone 1	1	38	27	1	10	98	31	55	R128	–		(Azerbaijan) (Russia) Gasanbekov – 30
1994	3rd, "West"	10	40	19	5	16	57	41	43	R256	–		(Azerbaijan) (Russia) Gasanbekov – 14
1995	3rd, "West"	7	42	24	4	14	47	43	76	R32	–		(Azerbaijan) (Russia) Gasanbekov – 24
1996	3rd, "West"	2	38	28	3	7	99	36	87	QF	–		(Azerbaijan) (Russia) Gasanbekov – 33
1997	2nd	13	42	18	6	18	66	72	60	R32	–		(Azerbaijan) (Russia) Gasanbekov – 17
1998	2nd	12	42	17	6	19	47	56	57	R64	–		(Azerbaijan) (Russia) Gasanbekov – 15
1999	2nd	1	42	26	8	8	55	20	86	R64	–		(Azerbaijan) (Russia) Sirkhayev – 11
2000	RFPL	4	30	15	7	8	44	31	52	QF	–		(Serbia and Montenegro) Ranđelović – 12
2001	RFPL	13	30	7	11	12	28	34	32	RU	UC	1st round	(Azerbaijan) (Russia) Sirkhayev – 10
2002	RFPL	15	30	5	10	15	22	42	25	R16	–		(Russia) Budunov – 4
2003	2nd	6	42	19	13	10	52	33	70	SF	–		(Russia) Budunov – 10
2004	2nd	8	42	16	12	14	50	53	60	R32	–		(Russia) Lakhiyalov – 9
2005	2nd	11	42	14	13	15	47	48	55	R64	–		(Russia) Lakhiyalov – 9
2006	2nd	15	42	15	8	19	57	66	53	R64	–		(Russia) Antipenko – 14
2007	2nd	10	42	16	9	17	41	44	57	R32	–		(Uzbekistan) (Russia) Agalarov – 6
2008	2nd	6	42	20	12	10	63	35	72	R64	–		(Georgia (country)) Ashvetiya – 17
2009	2nd	1	38	21	12	5	61	31	75	R32	–		(Georgia (country)) Martsvaladze – 13
2010	RFPL	11	30	9	6	15	29	39	33	R64	–		(Russia) Tsorayev – 8
2011–12	RFPL	5	44	19	13	12	54	42	70	R16	–		(Cameroon) Eto'o – 13
2012–13	RFPL	3	30	15	8	7	45	34	53	RU	EL	R16	(Ivory Coast) Traoré – 12
2013–14	RFPL	16	30	3	11	16	25	42	20	R32	EL	R16	7 players – 2
2014–15	2nd	2	34	22	5	7	60	22	71	R32	–		(Ivory Coast) Boli – 15
2015–16	RFPL	13	30	6	8	16	28	50	26	R16	–		(Ivory Coast) Boli – 9
2016–17	RFPL	12	30	7	9	14	24	38	30	QF	–		(Russia) Khubulov – 5
2017–18	RFPL	14	30	6	6	18	31	55	24	R32	–		(Argentina) Lescano – 5
2018–19	RFPL	15	30	5	6	19	13	50	21	R16	–		(Venezuela) Ponce – 5
2019–20	3rd, "South"	15	19	3	7	9	24	32	10	R2	–		2 players – 6
2020–21	3rd, "Group 1"	6	32	14	9	9	59	43	51	R2	–		Magomed Magomedov – 12
2021–22	3rd, "Group 1"	9	32	13	9	10	46	35	42	R3	–		Razhab Magomedov – 14

== Records ==
=== Appearances ===
Rank	Player	Matches
1.	(Russia) Ruslan Agalarov	429
2.	(Russia) Rasim Tagirbekov	274
3.	(Azerbaijan) Ibragim Gasanbekov	236
4.	(Russia) Narvik Sirkhayev	230
5.	(Russia) Eldar Mamayev	206
6.	(Azerbaijan) Emin Agaev	185
7.	(Russia) Ilya Abayev	168
8.	(Russia) Budun Budunov	168
9.	(Azerbaijan) Igor Getman	168
10.	(Russia) Gadzhi Bamatov	165

=== Top goalscorers ===
As of match played 5 June 2022

	Name	Years	League	Playoffs	Russian Cup	Europe	Total
1	(Azerbaijan) Ibragim Gasanbekov	1992–1999	157 (236)	(-)	13 (?)	(-)	170 (236+)
2	(Azerbaijan) Narvik Sırxayev	1994, 1997–2001, 2007	60 (230)	(-)	0 (?)	0 (1)	60 (231+)
3	(Uzbekistan) Ruslan Agalarov	1993–1998, 1999–2005, 2007–2008	50 (429)	(-)	0 (?)	0 (1)	50 (430+)
4	(Russia) Shamil Lakhiyalov	2003–2007, 2011–2012	39 (189)	(-)	0 (?)	(-)	39 (189+)
5	(Russia) Budun Budunov	1995, 1997–1998, 1999–2003, 2007	37 (168)	(-)	0 (?)	0 (0)	37 (168+)
6	(Cameroon) Samuel Eto'o	2011–2013	25 (53)	(-)	2 (4)	9 (16)	36 (73)
7	(Ivory Coast) Yannick Boli	2014–2017	26 (62)	2 (2)	2 (3)	(-)	30 (67)
8	(Russia) Gadzhi Bamatov	1997–2003, 2004–2007	24 (164)	(-)	0 (?)	0 (0)	24 (164+)
8	(Russia) Magomed Magomedov	2015–2019, 2019–2022	24 (71)	(-)	0 (5)	(-)	24 (76)
10	(Moldova) Nicolae Josan	2008–2010	23 (87)	(-)	0 (?)	(-)	23 (87+)

=== Top scorers by season ===
Season	Player	League	Cup	Europe	Playoffs	Total
1992–93	(Russia) Ibragim Gasanbekov	14	—	—	—	14
1993–94	(Russia) Ibragim Gasanbekov	30	2	—	—	32
1994–95	(Russia) Ibragim Gasanbekov	16	—	—	—	16
1995–96	(Russia) Ibragim Gasanbekov	24	3	—	—	27
1996–97	(Russia) Ibragim Gasanbekov	34	1	—	—	35
1997–98	(Russia) Ibragim Gasanbekov	17	—	—	—	17
1998–99	(Russia) Ibragim Gasanbekov	15	1	—	—	16
1999–00	(Russia) Narvik Sirkhayev	11	—	—	—	11
2000–01	(Federal Republic of Yugoslavia) Predrag Ranđelović	12	1	—	—	13
2001–02	(Russia) Narvik Sirkhayev	10	2	—	—	12
2002–03	(Russia) Budun Budunov	4	2	—	—	6
2003–04	(Russia) Budun Budunov	10	—	—	—	10
2004–05	(Russia) Shamil Lakhiyalov	9	1	—	—	10
2005–06	(Russia) Shamil Lakhiyalov	9	1	—	—	10
2006–07	(Russia) Aleksandr Antipenko	14	—	—	—	14
2007–08	(Russia) Ruslan Agalarov	6	1	—	—	7
2008–09	(Georgia (country)) Mikheil Ashvetia	17	—	—	—	17
2009–10	(Georgia (country)) Otar Martsvaladze	13	—	—	—	13
2010–11	(Russia) David Tsorayev	8	—	—	—	8
2011–12	(Cameroon) Samuel Eto'o	13	—	—	—	13
2012–13	(Cameroon) Samuel Eto'o	10	2	9	—	21
2013–14	(Moldova) Alexandru Epureanu	2	1	0	—	3
2014–15	(Ivory Coast) Yannick Boli	15	1	—	—	16
2015–16	(Ivory Coast) Yannick Boli	9	1	—	2	12
2016–17	(Ukraine) Pylyp Budkivskyi	4	2	—	—	6
2017–18	(Argentina) Juan Lescano	5	0	—	—	5
2018–19	(Venezuela) Andrés Ponce	5	0	—	—	5
2019–20	(Russia) Magomed Magomedov (Russia) Muslim Shikhbabayev	6	0	—	—	6
2020–21	(Russia) Magomed Magomedov	12	0	—	—	12
2021–22	(Russia) Razhab Magomedov	14	0	—	—	14

== Notable players ==
Had international caps for their respective countries. Players whose name is listed in bold represented their countries while playing for Anzhi.

Russia

- (Russia) Diniyar Bilyaletdinov
- (Russia) Aleksandr Bukharov
- (Russia) Vladimir Bystrov
- (Russia) **Igor Denisov**
- (Russia) **Vladimir Gabulov**
- (Russia) Danil Glebov
- (Russia) Sergey Grishin
- (Russia) Aleksei Igonin
- (Russia) Aleksei Ionov
- (Russia) Aleksandr Kokorin
- (Russia) Alan Kusov
- (Russia) **Arseny Logashov**
- (Russia) **Ilya Maksimov**
- (Russia) Ruslan Nigmatullin
- (Russia) Sergei Pesyakov
- (Russia) Sergey Ryzhikov
- (Russia) **Oleg Shatov**
- (Russia) **Fyodor Smolov**
- (Russia) Omari Tetradze
- (Russia) Ilia Tsymbalar
- (Russia) Renat Yanbayev
- (Russia) **Andrey Yeshchenko**
- (Russia) **Yuri Zhirkov**

Europe

- (Armenia) **Karlen Mkrtchyan**
- (Armenia) David Yurchenko
- (Azerbaijan) **Emin Ağayev**
- (Azerbaijan) **Arif Asadov**
- (Azerbaijan) **Elshan Gambarov**
- (Azerbaijan) **Ibragim Gasanbekov**
- (Azerbaijan) **Badavi Guseynov**
- (Azerbaijan) Mehdi Jannatov
- (Azerbaijan) Vyacheslav Lychkin
- (Azerbaijan) **Mahir Shukurov**
- (Azerbaijan) **Narvik Sırxayev**
- (Azerbaijan) Aleksandr Zhidkov
- (Belarus) **Ivan Mayewski**
- (Belarus) **Syarhey Yaskovich**
- (Bosnia and Herzegovina) **Hadis Zubanović**
- (Bosnia and Herzegovina) **Zehrudin Kavazović**
- (Bosnia and Herzegovina) **Amir Hamzić**
- (Bosnia and Herzegovina) **Stevo Glogovac**
- (Bosnia and Herzegovina) **Dženan Hošić**
- (Bosnia and Herzegovina) Amel Mujčinović
- (Bosnia and Herzegovina) Elvir Rahimić
- (Bosnia and Herzegovina) **Emir Spahić**
- (France) Lassana Diarra
- (Georgia (country)) Valeri Abramidze
- (Georgia (country)) Kakhaber Aladashvili
- (Georgia (country)) Mikheil Ashvetia
- (Georgia (country)) **Revazi Barabadze**
- (Georgia (country)) **Gia Grigalava**
- (Georgia (country)) Sandro Iashvili
- (Georgia (country)) Irakli Klimiashvili
- (Georgia (country)) Dato Kvirkvelia
- (Georgia (country)) **Otar Martsvaladze**
- (Georgia (country)) **Kakhaber Mzhavanadze**
- (Georgia (country)) **Giorgi Navalovski**
- (Georgia (country)) **Nukri Revishvili**
- (Georgia (country)) Edik Sadzhaya
- (Georgia (country)) Kakhaber Tskhadadze
- (Hungary) **Balázs Dzsudzsák**
- (Kazakhstan) **Dmitriy Byakov**
- (Kazakhstan) **Roman Uzdenov**
- (Kosovo) **Bernard Berisha**
- (Moldova) **Alexandru Epureanu**
- (Moldova) **Nicolae Josan**
- (Latvia) **Oskars Kļava**
- (Latvia) **Ēriks Pelcis**
- (Lithuania) Viktoras Olšanskis
- (Lithuania) **Andrius Velička**
- (Norway) Vadim Demidov
- (Portugal) Hugo Almeida
- (Romania) **Paul Anton**
- (Romania) Ovidiu Cuc
- (Romania) Nicolae Stanciu
- (Ukraine) Oleksandr Aliyev
- (Ukraine) Pylyp Budkivskyi
- (Ukraine) Vladyslav Prudius

Africa

- (Central African Republic) **Cédric Yambéré**
- (Cameroon) **Benoît Angbwa**
- (Cameroon) **Samuel Eto'o**
- (Cameroon) **Michel Pensée**
- (Republic of the Congo) Christopher Samba
- (Ghana) **Jonathan Mensah**
- (Ghana) Mohammed Rabiu
- (Ivory Coast) Yannick Boli
- (Ivory Coast) **Abdul Razak**
- (Ivory Coast) **Lacina Traoré**
- (Morocco) **Mbark Boussoufa**
- (Morocco) **Mehdi Carcela-González**
- (Morocco) Youssef Rabeh
- (Niger) **Amadou Moutari**
- (Nigeria) Dele Adeleye
- (Togo) Arafat Djako
- (Senegal) Ibra Kébé

Asia

- (Afghanistan) Sharif Mukhammad
- (Kyrgyzstan) **Sergei Ivanov**
- (Kyrgyzstan) **Valery Kichin**
- (Tajikistan) **Alier Ashurmamadov**
- (Tajikistan) **Andrei Manannikov**
- (Turkmenistan) **Pavel Harçik**
- (Uzbekistan) **Ruslan Agalarov**
- (Uzbekistan) **Odil Akhmedov**
- (Uzbekistan) Jafar Irismetov
- (Uzbekistan) **Dostonbek Khamdamov**

South America

- (Brazil) Roberto Carlos
- (Brazil) Jucilei
- (Brazil) Diego Tardelli
- (Brazil) Willian
- (Venezuela) **Jhon Chancellor**
- (Venezuela) **Andrés Ponce**

== Managers ==
- (Russia) Vladimir Petrov (1993)
- (Azerbaijan) Ahmad Alaskarov (1994)
- (Russia) Aleksandr Markarov (interim) (1995)
- (Russia) Eduard Malofeyev (1996–98)
- (Russia) Aleksandr Reshetnyak (interim) (1998)
- (Russia) Pyotr Shubin (1998)
- (Russia) Gadzhi Gadzhiyev (1999–01)
- (Russia) Aleksandr Markarov (interim) (2001)
- (Ukraine) Leonid Tkachenko (2001–02)
- (Ukraine) Myron Markevych (10 July 2002 – 10 Oct 2002)
- (Russia) Aleksandr Piskaryov (2003)
- (Russia) Aleksandr Reshetnyak (interim) (2003)
- (Russia) Aleksandr Markarov (interim) (2003)
- (Russia) Yevgeni Kuznetsov (2004)
- (Russia) Aleksandr Reshetnyak (interim) (2004)
- (Russia) Dmitri Galiamin (2004–06)
- (Russia) Aleksandr Markarov (2006)
- (Russia) Omari Tetradze (1 Jan 2007 – 14 March 2010)

Information correct as of match played 15 March 2020. Only competitive matches are counted.
Nationality is indicated by the corresponding FIFA country code(s).

Name	Nat.	From	To	Pld	W	D	L	GF	GA	Win %	Notes
Arsen Akayev (interim)	Russia	18 March 2010	18 April 2010	4	2	0	2	7	5	50.00	
Gadzhi Gadzhiyev	Russia	18 April 2010	28 September 2011	54	20	13	21	58	62	37.04	
Andrei Gordeyev (interim)	Russia	29 September 2011	27 December 2011	7	3	2	2	11	9	42.86	
Yuri Krasnozhan	Russia	27 December 2011	13 February 2012	0	0	0	0	0	0	—	
Guus Hiddink	Netherlands	17 February 2012	22 July 2013	62	33	15	14	89	52	53.23	
René Meulensteen (interim)	Netherlands	22 July 2013	7 August 2013	2	0	1	1	1	2	0.00	
Gadzhi Gadzhiyev	Russia	8 August 2013	21 May 2014	27	3	9	15	21	37	11.11	Relegated
Sergei Tashuyev	Russia	21 May 2014	9 June 2015	36	23	5	8	65	25	63.89	Promoted
Yuri Semin	Russia	18 June 2015	29 September 2015	11	2	3	6	12	17	18.18	
Ruslan Agalarov	Uzbekistan	29 September 2015	31 May 2016	23	7	5	11	24	38	30.43	
Pavel Vrba	Czech Republic	30 June 2016	30 December 2016	19	7	5	7	19	19	36.84	
Aleksandr Grigoryan	Russia	5 January 2017	13 August 2017	20	3	4	13	14	31	15.00	
Vadim Skripchenko	Belarus	14 August 2017	31 May 2018	27	6	6	15	32	53	22.22	
Magomed Adiyev	Russia	4 June 2018	3 June 2019	32	6	6	20	15	52	18.75	Relegated
Valeri Barmin	Russia	24 July 2019	28 October 2019	16	2	6	8	18	26	12.50	
Artur Sadirov	Russia	28 October 2019	5 June 2022	71	30	19	22	116	88	42.25	
