= 2001 FC Anzhi Makhachkala season =

Anzhi Makhachkala
2001 season
- Chairman: Magomed-Sultan Magomedov
- Manager: Gadzhi Gadzhiyev (until 15 July); Aleksandr Markarov (Interim) (15 July - 4 November); Leonid Tkachenko (from 4 November)
- Stadium: Dinamo Stadium
- Top Division: 13th
- Russian Cup: Runners Up
- Russian Cup: Sixth Round vs Dynamo Moscow
- Top goalscorer: League: Narvik Sırxayev (10); All: Narvik Sırxayev (11)
- Highest home attendance: 18,000 vs CSKA Moscow (18 August 2001)
- Lowest home attendance: 9,000 vs Fakel Voronezh (18 July 2001)
- Average home league attendance: 13,533 (8 November 2001)
Home colours	Away colours

The 2001 FC Anzhi Makhachkala season was the 2nd season that the club played in the Russian Top Division, the highest tier of football in Russia, following their promotion from the National Football League in 1999. They finished the season in 13th, were runners-up in the 2001–02 cup and reached the Sixth Round of the 2002–03 cup losing to Dynamo Moscow, and were knocked out of the UEFA Cup at the First Round stage after a 0–1 defeat to Rangers over one leg in Warsaw, Poland.

== Season events ==
After Gadzhi Gadzhiyev left the club during the summer, Aleksandr Markarov was appointed as an interim manager until a permanent manager could be found.

On 19 August 2001, during the game against CSKA Moscow, Serhiy Perkhun collided head-to-head with Anzhi forward Budun Budunov who also sustained serious head trauma during the collision. At first, the injury appeared to be minor. Perkhun was substituted for and diagnosed with a broken nose. However he became suddenly comatose on the way to the airport and died nine days later from a brain hemorrhage.

On 27 September, Anzhi faced Rangers in the First Round of the UEFA Cup, with the match being switched to a single-legged tie and moved to neutral Warsaw from Dagestan due to increased fighting in neighbouring Chechnya.

== Squad ==
As of 8 November 2001

No.	Name	Nationality	Position	Date of birth (age)	Signed from	Signed in	Contract ends	Apps.	Goals
Goalkeepers
1	Aleksandr Zhidkov	(Azerbaijan)	GK	16 March 1965 (aged 36)	Hapoel Tzafririm Holon	1999			
25	Sergey Armishev	(Russia)	GK	29 April 1976 (aged 25)	Uralan Elista	1999			
	Amel Mujčinović	(Bosnia and Herzegovina)	GK	20 November 1973 (aged 27)	Publikum Celje	2001			
	Stanislav Khoteyev	(Russia)	GK	7 March 1981 (aged 20)	Lokomotiv Moscow	2001			
Defenders
2	Denis Peremenin	(Turkmenistan)	DF	4 January 1976 (aged 25)	Köpetdag Aşgabat	1999			
5	Syarhey Yaskovich	(Belarus)	DF	14 January 1972 (aged 29)	Shakhtar Donetsk	1999			
6	Andrei Gordeyev	(Russia)	DF	1 April 1975 (aged 26)	Dynamo Moscow	1999			
14	Arsen Akayev	(Russia)	DF	28 December 1970 (aged 30)	Dynamo Makhachkala	1999			
15	Michel Pensée	(Cameroon)	DF	16 June 1973 (aged 28)	Aves	2001		21	0
19	Nebojša Stojković	(Russia)	DF	2 June 1974 (aged 27)	Pobeda	2000			
22	Dženan Hošić	(Bosnia and Herzegovina)	DF	13 May 1976 (aged 25)	Sarajevo	2000			
	Ilgar Abdurahmanov	(Azerbaijan)	DF	27 March 1979 (aged 22)	Belshina Bobruisk	2001		2	0
	Serhiy Dmytriyev	(Ukraine)	DF	3 November 1978 (aged 23)	Metalurh Donetsk	2001			
Midfielders
3	Goran Jovanović	(Federal Republic of Yugoslavia)	MF	20 March 1976 (aged 25)	Železničar Niš	2001		11	0
4	Marek Hollý	(Slovakia)	MF	20 August 1973 (aged 28)	CSKA Moscow	2001		7	0
7	Ruslan Agalarov	(Uzbekistan)	MF	21 February 1974 (aged 27)	Lokomotiv-Taym Mineralnye Vody	1999			
8	Narvik Sırxayev	(Azerbaijan)	MF	16 March 1974 (aged 27)	Dynamo Makhachkala	1997			
10	Valeri Likhobabenko	(Russia)	MF	17 February 1976 (aged 25)	Dynamo-2 Moscow	1999			
13	Murad Ramazanov	(Russia)	MF	10 March 1979 (aged 22)	Dynamo Makhachkala	1999			
17	Ratko Nikolić	(Federal Republic of Yugoslavia)	MF	11 July 1977 (aged 24)	Spartak-Chukotka Moscow	2001		1	0
20	Ilya Tsymbalar	(Russia)	MF	17 June 1969 (aged 32)	Lokomotiv Moscow	2001		11	0
21	Sergei Ivanov	(Kyrgyzstan)	MF	30 May 1980 (aged 21)	Kairat	2001		7	0
	Amir Hamzić	(Bosnia and Herzegovina)	MF	5 January 1975 (aged 26)	Aarau	2001		0	0
	Zehrudin Kavazović	(Bosnia and Herzegovina)	MF	16 February 1975 (aged 26)	VfL Osnabrück	1999			
	Gadzhi Bamatov	(Russia)	MF	16 February 1982 (aged 19)	Youth Team	1997			
Forwards
9	Budun Budunov	(Russia)	FW	4 December 1975 (aged 25)	Lokomotiv-Taym Mineralnye Vody	1999			
12	Magomed Adiyev	(Russia)	FW	30 June 1977 (aged 24)	Spartak-d Moscow	2000			
18	Edu	(Brazil)	FW	19 April 1974 (aged 27)	loan from Krylia Sovetov	2001	2001	15	2
24	Valery Alekseyev	(Russia)	FW	16 February 1979 (aged 22)	Spartak Kostroma	2000			
	Ishref Magomedov	(Russia)	FW	6 October 1980 (aged 21)	CSKA Moscow	2001		0	0
	Aleksei Sherstnyov	(Russia)	FW	1 May 1975 (aged 26)	Ventspils	2000			
Players who left during the season
4	Elvir Rahimić	(Bosnia and Herzegovina)	MF	4 April 1976 (aged 25)	Vorwärts Steyr	1999			
10	Jupiter Yves Ngangue	(Cameroon)	FW	14 May 1980 (aged 21)	Dynamo Douala	2001			
18	Predrag Ranđelović	(Federal Republic of Yugoslavia)	FW	13 September 1976 (aged 25)	Zvezdara	1999			
20	Anatoli Tebloyev	(Russia)	MF	16 July 1974 (aged 27)	Volgar-Gazprom Astrakhan	2000			
	Lazo Lipovski	(North Macedonia)	GK	27 March 1966 (aged 35)	Sloga Jugomagnat	1998			
	Mikhail Mikhaylov	(Russia)	DF	11 November 1981 (aged 19)	Lokomotiv-2 Moscow	2001			
	Dmitry Byakov	(Kazakhstan)	MF	9 April 1978 (aged 23)	Kairat	2001		0	0
	Sergei Nekrasov	(Russia)	MF	29 January 1973 (aged 28)	Dynamo Moscow	2000			

== Transfers ==
=== In ===
Date	Position	Nationality	Name	From	Fee	Ref.
Winter 2001	GK	(Russia)	Stanislav Khoteyev	Lokomotiv Moscow		
Winter 2001	DF	(Azerbaijan)	Ilgar Abdurahmanov	Belshina Bobruisk		
Winter 2001	DF	(Cameroon)	Michel Pensée	Aves		
Winter 2001	DF	(Russia)	Mikhail Mikhaylov	Lokomotiv-2 Moscow		
Winter 2001	DF	(Ukraine)	Serhiy Dmytriyev	Metalurh Donetsk		
Winter 2001	MF	(Bosnia and Herzegovina)	Amir Hamzić	Aarau		
Winter 2001	MF	(Kazakhstan)	Dmitriy Byakov	Kairat		
Winter 2001	MF	(Kyrgyzstan)	Sergei Ivanov	Kairat		
Winter 2001	MF	(Russia)	Ilya Tsymbalar	Lokomotiv Moscow		
Winter 2001	MF	(Federal Republic of Yugoslavia)	Goran Jovanović	Železničar Niš		
Winter 2001	MF	(Federal Republic of Yugoslavia)	Ratko Nikolić	OFK Beograd		
Winter 2001	FW	(Cameroon)	Jupiter Yves Ngangue	Dynamo Douala		
Summer 2001	GK	(Bosnia and Herzegovina)	Amel Mujčinović	Publikum Celje		
Summer 2001	MF	(Slovakia)	Marek Hollý	CSKA Moscow		

=== Loans in ===
Date from	Position	Nationality	Name	From	Date to	Ref.
Summer 2001	FW	(Brazil)	Edu	Krylia Sovetov	End of season	

=== Out ===
Date	Position	Nationality	Name	To	Fee	Ref.
Summer 2001	DF	(Russia)	Mikhail Mikhaylov	Lokomotiv Moscow		
Summer 2001	MF	(Bosnia and Herzegovina)	Elvir Rahimić	CSKA Moscow		
Summer 2001	MF	(Kazakhstan)	Dmitriy Byakov	Kairat		
Summer 2001	MF	(Russia)	Sergei Nekrasov	Khimki		
Summer 2001	MF	(Russia)	Anatoli Tebloyev	Alania Vladikavkaz		
Summer 2001	FW	(Cameroon)	Jupiter Yves Ngangue	Lunel		
Summer 2001	FW	(Federal Republic of Yugoslavia)	Predrag Ranđelović	CSKA Moscow		

=== Released ===
Date	Position	Nationality	Name	Joined	Date	Ref.
30 June 2001	GK	(North Macedonia)	Lazo Lipovski			
31 December 2001	GK	(Azerbaijan)	Aleksandr Zhidkov	Tom Tomsk		
31 December 2001	DF	(Azerbaijan)	Ilgar Abdurahmanov	Chernomorets Novorossiysk		
31 December 2001	DF	(Belarus)	Syarhey Yaskovich	Olympique Alès		
31 December 2001	MF	(Azerbaijan)	Narvik Sırxayev	Lokomotiv Moscow		
31 December 2001	MF	(Bosnia and Herzegovina)	Zehrudin Kavazović	Čelik Zenica		
31 December 2001	MF	(Russia)	Valeri Likhobabenko	Anzhi Makhachkala	1 January 2003	
31 December 2001	MF	(Federal Republic of Yugoslavia)	Goran Jovanović	Győri ETO		
31 December 2001	MF	(Federal Republic of Yugoslavia)	Ratko Nikolić	Radnički Beograd	1 January 2004	
31 December 2001	MF	(Slovakia)	Marek Hollý	Volgar Astrakhan		
31 December 2001	FW	(Russia)	Aleksei Sherstnyov	Torpedo-ZIL Moscow		

== Competitions ==
=== Overview ===
Competition	First match	Last match	Starting round	Final position	Record							
Competition	First match	Last match	Starting round	Final position	Pld	W	D	L	GF	GA	GD	Win %
Top Division	10 March 2001	8 November 2001	Matchday 1	13th	30	7	11	12	28	34	−6	23.33
2000–01 Russian Cup	11 April 2001	20 June 2001	Quarterfinal	Runners Up	3	2	0	1	4	3	+1	66.67
2001–02 Russian Cup	8 September 2000	13 October 2001	Fifth Round	Sixth Round	2	0	1	1	2	7	−5	0.00
2001–02 UEFA Cup	27 September 2001	27 September 2001	First round	First round	1	0	0	1	0	1	−1	0.00
Total					36	9	12	15	34	45	−11	25.00

Last updated: 8 November 2001
Source: See Results

=== Top Division ===
==== League table ====
Pos	Team	Pld	W	D	L	GF	GA	GD	Pts	Qualification or relegation
11	Rostselmash	30	8	8	14	29	43	−14	32	
12	Alania Vladikavkaz	30	8	8	14	31	47	−16	32	
13	Anzhi Makhachkala	30	7	11	12	28	34	−6	32	
14	Torpedo-ZIL Moscow	30	7	10	13	22	35	−13	31	
15	Fakel Voronezh (R)	30	8	4	18	30	53	−23	28	Relegation to First Division

Source: rsssf.com
Rules for classification: 1) points; 2) goal difference; 3) number of goals scored.
(R) Relegated

==== Results summary ====
Overall								Home						Away					
Pld	W	D	L	GF	GA	GD	Pts	W	D	L	GF	GA	GD	W	D	L	GF	GA	GD
30	7	11	12	28	34	−6	32	6	5	4	18	13	+5	1	6	8	10	21	−11

Last updated: 8 November 2001.
Source: See Results

==== Results ====
10 March 2001 1	Torpedo-ZIL Moscow	1 – 1	Anzhi Makhachkala	Moscow
MSK (UTC+4)	Lebed 52'	Report	Sırxayev 6'	Stadium: Eduard Streltsov Stadium; Attendance: 7,000

17 March 2001 2	Anzhi Makhachkala	1 – 1	Saturn	Makhachkala
MSK (UTC+4)	Budunov 78'	Report	Dzamikhov 83'	Stadium: Dynamo Stadium; Attendance: 12,000

31 March 2001 3	Fakel Voronezh	0 – 1	Anzhi Makhachkala	Voronezh
MSK (UTC+4)		Report	Budunov 51'	Stadium: Tsentralnyi Profsoyuz Stadion; Attendance: 24,000

7 April 2001 4	Anzhi Makhachkala	1 – 0	Dynamo Moscow	Makhachkala
MSK (UTC+4)	Agalarov 75'	Report		Stadium: Dynamo Stadium; Attendance: 12,000

14 April 2001 5	Krylia Sovetov	0 – 0	Anzhi Makhachkala	Samara
MSK (UTC+4)	Qosimov (penalty missed) 11'	Report		Stadium: Metallurg Stadium; Attendance: 35,000

18 April 2001 6	Anzhi Makhachkala	0 – 1	Torpedo Moscow	Makhachkala
MSK (UTC+4)		Report	Litvinov 7'; Gashkin (penalty missed) 62'	Stadium: Dynamo Stadium; Attendance: 17,000

28 April 2001 7	Alania Vladikavkaz	2 – 1	Anzhi Makhachkala	Vladikavkaz
MSK (UTC+4)	Tarlowski 85'; Bestayev 87'	Report	Sırxayev 53'	Stadium: Republican Spartak Stadium; Attendance: 15,000

6 May 2001 8	CSKA Moscow	1 – 0	Anzhi Makhachkala	Khimki
MSK (UTC+4)	Popov 89'	Report		Stadium: Arena Khimki; Attendance: 10,000

12 May 2001 9	Anzhi Makhachkala	1 – 0	Lokomotiv Moscow	Makhachkala
MSK (UTC+4)	Ranđelović 70'	Report		Stadium: Dynamo Stadium; Attendance: 15,000

19 May 2001 10	Zenit St.Petersburg	1 – 1	Anzhi Makhachkala	Saint Petersburg
MSK (UTC+4)	Popovych 56' (pen.)	Report	Sırxayev 46'	Stadium: Petrovsky Stadium; Attendance: 19,000

26 May 2001 11	Anzhi Makhachkala	2 – 0	Sokol Saratov	Makhachkala
MSK (UTC+4)	Budunov 56'; Sırxayev 70'	Report		Stadium: Dynamo Stadium; Attendance: 17,500

10 June 2001 12	Chernomorets Novorossiysk	0 – 0	Anzhi Makhachkala	Novorossiysk
MSK (UTC+4)		Report		Stadium: Central Stadium; Attendance: 10,000

16 June 2001 13	Anzhi Makhachkala	1 – 2	Spartak Moscow	Makhachkala
MSK (UTC+4)	Adiyev 88'	Report	Shirko 17'; Titov 61'	Stadium: Dynamo Stadium; Attendance: 17,500

24 June 2001 14	Rotor Volgograd	1 – 1	Anzhi Makhachkala	Volgograd
MSK (UTC+4)	Zubko 38'	Report	Ramazanov 55'	Stadium: Central Stadium; Attendance: 11,000

30 June 2001 15	Anzhi Makhachkala	0 – 1	Rostselmash	Makhachkala
MSK (UTC+4)		Report	Kirichenko 78'	Stadium: Dynamo Stadium; Attendance: 10,000

11 July 2001 16	Saturn	1 – 0	Anzhi Makhachkala	Ramenskoye
MSK (UTC+4)	Rogaciov 42'	Report		Stadium: Saturn Stadium; Attendance: 9,000

18 July 2001 16	Anzhi Makhachkala	2 – 2	Fakel Voronezh	Makhachkala
MSK (UTC+4)	Budunov 23'; Sırxayev 38'	Report	Alkhimov 39'; Safronov 50'	Stadium: Dynamo Stadium; Attendance: 9,000

22 July 2001 18	Dynamo Moscow	1 – 1	Anzhi Makhachkala	Khimki
MSK (UTC+4)	Khazov 31'	Report	Sırxayev 41'	Stadium: Arena Khimki; Attendance: 6,000

27 July 2001 19	Anzhi Makhachkala	4 – 1	Krylia Sovetov	Makhachkala
MSK (UTC+4)	Sırxayev 10'; Agalarov 45', 78'; Edu 90'	Report	Žutautas 52'	Stadium: Dynamo Stadium; Attendance: 14,000

4 August 2001 20	Torpedo Moscow	2 – 1	Anzhi Makhachkala	Ramenskoye
MSK (UTC+4)	Leonchenko 31' (pen.); Vyazmikin 39'	Report	Budunov 19'	Stadium: Saturn Stadium; Attendance: 5,000

11 August 2001 21	Anzhi Makhachkala	3 – 2	Alania Vladikavkaz	Makhachkala
MSK (UTC+4)	Agalarov 52' (pen.); Budunov 59', 71'	Report	Bazayev 7'; Bestayev 67'	Stadium: Dynamo Stadium; Attendance: 14,000

18 August 2001 22	Anzhi Makhachkala	0 – 0	CSKA Moscow	Makhachkala
MSK (UTC+4)		Report		Stadium: Dynamo Stadium; Attendance: 18,000

26 August 2001 23	Lokomotiv Moscow	4 – 0	Anzhi Makhachkala	Moscow
MSK (UTC+4)	Loskov 57', 69'; Obiorah 84', 88'	Report		Stadium: Lokomotiv Stadium; Attendance: 4,500

16 September 2001 24	Anzhi Makhachkala	0 – 0	Zenit St.Petersburg	Makhachkala
MSK (UTC+4)		Report		Stadium: Dynamo Stadium; Attendance: 16,000

1 October 2001 26	Anzhi Makhachkala	3 – 1	Chernomorets	Makhachkala
MSK (UTC+4)	Agalarov 42' (pen.); Sırxayev 44'; Edu 87'	Report	Mashkarin 51'	Stadium: Dynamo Stadium; Attendance: 10,000

5 October 2001 25	Sokol Saratov	2 – 0	Anzhi Makhachkala	Saratov
MSK (UTC+4)	Veretennikov 3'; Fedkov (penalty missed) 5' 36'	Report		Stadium: Lokomotiv Stadium; Attendance: 12,500

20 October 2001 27	Spartak Moscow	2 – 1	Anzhi Makhachkala	Moscow
MSK (UTC+4)	Beschastnykh 38'; Baranov 47'	Report	Sırxayev 63'	Stadium: Luzhniki Stadium; Attendance: 12,500

27 October 2001 29	Rostselmash	3 – 2	Anzhi Makhachkala	Rostov-on-Don
MSK (UTC+4)	Fomenka 37'; Kirichenko 61' (pen.); Osinov 88'	Report	Sırxayev 42'; Adiyev 51'	Stadium: Olimp-2; Attendance: 10,000

4 November 2001 30	Anzhi Makhachkala	0 – 2	Torpedo-ZIL Moscow	Makhachkala
MSK (UTC+4)		Report	Piyuk 5', 19'	Stadium: Dynamo Stadium; Attendance: 11,000

8 November 2001 28	Anzhi Makhachkala	0 – 0	Rotor Volgograd	Makhachkala
MSK (UTC+4)		Report		Stadium: Dynamo Stadium; Attendance: 10,000

=== Russian Cup ===
==== 2000-01 ====
11 April 2001 Quarterfinal	Anzhi Makhachkala	1 – 0	Torpedo Moscow	Makhachkala
MSK (UTC+4)	Pensée 80'	Report		Stadium: Dynamo Stadium

16 May 2001 Semifinal	Anzhi Makhachkala	2 – 1	Krylia Sovetov	Makhachkala
MSK (UTC+4)	Adiyev 49'; Ranđelović 70'	Report	Ângelo 66'	Stadium: Dynamo Stadium

===== Final =====
20 June 2001	Lokomotiv Moscow	1 – 1 (a.e.t.) (4 – 3 p)	Anzhi Makhachkala	Moscow
MSK (UTC+4)	Janashia 90'; Sarkisyan (yellow card) 94'	Report	Stojković (yellow card) 46'; Sırxayev 90'; Alekseyev (yellow card) 90'; Agalarov (yellow card) 99'	Stadium: Dynamo Stadium; Attendance: 8,000; Referee: Valentin Ivanov
	Penalties
	Izmailov (penalty scored); Lekgetho (penalty scored); Chugainov (penalty missed); Maminov (penalty scored); Loskov (penalty scored)		Agalarov (penalty scored); Akayev (penalty missed); Sirkhayev (penalty scored); Rahimić (penalty missed); Yaskovich (penalty scored)

==== 2001-02 ====
8 September 2001 Fifth Round	Khimki	2 – 2 (2 – 4 p)	Anzhi Makhachkala	Khimki
MSK (UTC+4)	Voronkov 20'; Shvetsov 35'	Report	Adiyev 15'; Akayev 79'	Stadium: Novye Khimki Stadium

13 October 2001 Sixth Round	Dynamo Moscow	5 – 0	Anzhi Makhachkala	Moscow
MSK (UTC+4)	Bulykin 22', 69'; Grishin 26'; Khazov 62'; Gusev 88'	Report		Stadium: Dynamo Stadium

=== UEFA Cup ===
27 September 2001 First round	Anzhi Makhachkala (Russia)	0 – 1	(Scotland) Rangers	Warsaw, Poland
MSK (UTC+3)	Tsymbalar (yellow card) 52'	Report	Konterman 84'	Stadium: Stadion Wojska Polskiego; Referee: Edgar Steinborn (Germany)
Note: Match played over one leg at a neutral venue in Warsaw, Poland, due to security concerns in Russia.

== Squad statistics ==
As of match played 8 November 2001

=== Appearances and goals ===
No.	Pos	Nat	Player	Total		Top Division		2000-01 Russian Cup		2001-02 Russian Cup		UEFA Cup	
No.	Pos	Nat	Player	Apps	Goals	Apps	Goals	Apps	Goals	Apps	Goals	Apps	Goals
1	GK	(Azerbaijan) AZE	Aleksandr Zhidkov	29	0	28	0	0	0	0	0	1	0
2	DF	(Turkmenistan) TKM	Denis Peremenin	9	0	9	0	0	0	0	0	0	0
3	MF	(Federal Republic of Yugoslavia) YUG	Goran Jovanović	11	0	11	0	0	0	0	0	0	0
4	MF	(Slovakia) SVK	Marek Hollý	6	0	6	0	0	0	0	0	0	0
5	DF	(Belarus) BLR	Syarhey Yaskovich	27	0	26	0	0	0	0	0	1	0
6	DF	(Russia) RUS	Andrei Gordeyev	7	0	6	0	0	0	0	0	1	0
7	MF	(Uzbekistan) UZB	Ruslan Agalarov	30	5	29	5	0	0	0	0	1	0
8	MF	(Azerbaijan) AZE	Narvik Sırxayev	31	10	30	10	0	0	0	0	1	0
9	FW	(Russia) RUS	Budun Budunov	15	7	15	7	0	0	0	0	0	0
10	MF	(Russia) RUS	Valeri Likhobabenko	14	0	14	0	0	0	0	0	0	0
12	FW	(Russia) RUS	Magomed Adiev	27	2	26	2	0	0	0	0	1	0
13	MF	(Russia) RUS	Murad Ramazanov	18	1	17	1	0	0	0	0	1	0
14	DF	(Russia) RUS	Arsen Akayev	18	0	17	0	0	0	0	0	1	0
15	DF	(Cameroon) CMR	Michel Pensée	21	0	20	0	0	0	0	0	1	0
17	MF	(Federal Republic of Yugoslavia) YUG	Ratko Nikolić	1	0	0	0	0	0	0	0	0+1	0
18	FW	(Brazil) BRA	Edu	13	2	12	2	0	0	0	0	1	0
19	DF	(Federal Republic of Yugoslavia) YUG	Nebojša Stojković	20	0	20	0	0	0	0	0	0	0
20	MF	(Russia) RUS	Ilya Tsymbalar	9	0	8	0	0	0	0	0	1	0
21	MF	(Kyrgyzstan) KGZ	Sergei Ivanov	7	0	7	0	0	0	0	0	0	0
22	DF	(Bosnia and Herzegovina) BIH	Dženan Hošić	12	0	12	0	0	0	0	0	0	0
24	FW	(Russia) RUS	Valery Alekseyev	6	0	6	0	0	0	0	0	0	0
25	GK	(Russia) RUS	Sergey Armishev	4	0	4	0	0	0	0	0	0	0
	DF	(Azerbaijan) AZE	Ilgar Abdurahmanov	2	0	2	0	0	0	0	0	0	0
	DF	(Ukraine) UKR	Serhiy Dmytriyev	2	0	2	0	0	0	0	0	0	0
	MF	(Russia) RUS	Gadzhi Bamatov	4	0	4	0	0	0	0	0	0	0
	MF	(Bosnia and Herzegovina) BIH	Zehrudin Kavazović	3	0	3	0	0	0	0	0	0	0
	FW	(Russia) RUS	Aleksei Sherstnyov	14	0	14	0	0	0	0	0	0	0
Players who appeared for Anzhi Makhachkala but left during the season:
4	MF	(Bosnia and Herzegovina) BIH	Elvir Rahimić	14	0	14	0	0	0	0	0	0	0
10	FW	(Cameroon) CMR	Jupiter Yves Ngangue	5	0	5	0	0	0	0	0	0	0
18	FW	(Federal Republic of Yugoslavia) YUG	Predrag Ranđelović	10	1	10	1	0	0	0	0	0	0
20	MF	(Russia) RUS	Anatoli Tebloyev	8	0	8	0	0	0	0	0	0	0

=== Goal scorers ===
Place	Position	Nation	Number	Name	Top Division	2000-01 Russian Cup	2001-02 Russian Cup	UEFA Cup	Total
1	MF	(Azerbaijan)	8	Narvik Sırxayev	10	1	0	0	11
2	FW	(Russia)	9	Budun Budunov	7	0	0	0	7
3	MF	(Uzbekistan)	7	Ruslan Agalarov	5	0	0	0	5
4	FW	(Russia)	12	Magomed Adiyev	2	1	1	0	4
5	MF	(Brazil)	18	Edu	2	0	0	0	2
5	FW	(Federal Republic of Yugoslavia)	18	Predrag Ranđelović	1	1	0	0	2
7	FW	(Russia)	13	Murad Ramazanov	1	0	0	0	1
7	DF	(Cameroon)	15	Michel Pensée	0	1	0	0	1
7	DF	(Russia)	14	Arsen Akayev	0	0	1	0	1
				TOTALS	28	4	2	0	34

=== Clean sheets ===
Place	Position	Nation	Number	Name	Top Division	2000-01 Russian Cup	2001-02 Russian Cup	UEFA Cup	Total
1	GK	(Azerbaijan)	1	Aleksandr Zhidkov	0	0	0	0	0
				TOTALS	9	1	0	0	10

=== Disciplinary record ===
Number	Nation	Position	Name	Top Division		2000-01 Russian Cup		2001-02 Russian Cup		UEFA Cup		Total	
Number	Nation	Position	Name	Booked	Sent off (straight red)	Booked	Sent off (straight red)	Booked	Sent off (straight red)	Booked	Sent off (straight red)	Booked	Sent off (straight red)
2	(Turkmenistan)	DF	Denis Peremenin	1	0	0	0	0	0	0	0	1	0
3	(Federal Republic of Yugoslavia)	MF	Goran Jovanović	3	0	0	0	0	0	0	0	3	0
4	(Czech Republic)	MF	Marek Hollý	1	0	0	0	0	0	0	0	1	0
6	(Russia)	DF	Andrei Gordeyev	1	1	0	0	0	0	0	0	1	1
7	(Uzbekistan)	MF	Ruslan Agalarov	3	0	1	0	0	0	0	0	4	0
8	(Azerbaijan)	MF	Narvik Sırxayev	2	0	0	0	0	0	0	0	3	0
12	(Russia)	FW	Magomed Adiyev	6	0	0	0	0	0	0	0	6	0
13	(Russia)	MF	Murad Ramazanov	0	0	0	0	2	0	0	0	2	0
14	(Russia)	DF	Arsen Akayev	1	0	0	0	0	0	0	0	1	0
15	(Cameroon)	DF	Michel Pensée	2	0	0	0	0	0	0	0	2	0
18	(Brazil)	FW	Edu	2	0	0	0	0	0	0	0	2	0
19	(Federal Republic of Yugoslavia)	DF	Nebojša Stojković	0	0	1	0	0	0	0	0	1	0
20	(Russia)	MF	Ilya Tsymbalar	0	0	0	0	0	0	1	0	1	0
22	(Bosnia and Herzegovina)	DF	Dženan Hošić	4	0	0	0	0	0	0	0	4	0
24	(Russia)	FW	Valery Alekseyev	0	0	1	0	0	0	0	0	1	0
	(Russia)	MF	Gadzhi Bamatov	2	0	0	0	1	0	0	0	3	0
	(Russia)	FW	Aleksei Sherstnyov	0	0	0	0	1	0	0	0	1	0
Players who left Anzhi Makhachkala during the season:
18	(Federal Republic of Yugoslavia)	FW	Predrag Ranđelović	1	0	0	0	0	0	0	0	1	0
20	(Russia)	MF	Anatoli Tebloyev	2	0	0	0	0	0	0	0	2	0
			TOTALS	31	1	3	0	4	0	1	0	36	1

== Notes ==
- The UEFA Cup First Round tie between Anzhi Makhachkala and Rangers was played over One-Leg at a neutral venue due security concerns regarding the ongoing Chechen War in the neighboring area.
