= 2003 FC Anzhi Makhachkala season =

Anzhi Makhachkala
2003 season
- Chairman: Magomed-Sultan Magomedov
- Manager: Gadzhi Gadzhiyev
- Stadium: Dinamo Stadium
- First Division: 6th
- Russian Cup: Semifinal vs Rostov
- Russian Cup: Fifth round vs Rotor Volgograd
- Top goalscorer: League: Budun Budunov (10); All: Shamil Lakhiyalov (11)
Home colours	Away colours

The 2003 FC Anzhi Makhachkala season was the club's 1st back in the First Division, following their relegation from the Russian Top Division the previous season. They finished the season in 6th place, reaching the semifinals of the 2002–03 Russian Cup and the fifth round of the 2003–04 Russian Cup.

== Squad ==
No.	Name	Nationality	Position	Date of birth (age)	Signed from	Signed in	Contract ends	Apps.	Goals
Goalkeepers
	Sergey Armishev	(Russia)	GK	29 April 1976 (aged 27)	Uralan Elista	1999		78	0
	Aleksandr Makarov	(Russia)	GK	23 August 1978 (aged 25)	Zenit St.Petersburg	2003		24	0
Defenders
	Kakhaber Mzhavanadze	(Georgia (country))	DF	2 October 1978 (aged 25)	Spartak Moscow	2002			
	Kakhaber Tskhadadze	(Georgia (country))	DF	7 September 1968 (aged 35)	Locomotive Tbilisi	2003			
	Nicolae Stanciu	(Romania)	DF	13 November 1973 (aged 29)	Rapid București	2002			
	Arsen Akayev	(Russia)	DF	28 December 1970 (aged 32)	Dynamo Makhachkala	1999			
	Andrei Gordeyev	(Russia)	DF	1 April 1975 (aged 28)	Dynamo Moscow	1999		116	3
	Rasim Tagirbekov	(Russia)	DF	4 May 1984 (aged 19)	Youth Team	2003			
	Omari Tetradze	(Russia)	DF	13 October 1969 (aged 34)	Alania Vladikavkaz	2003			
	Renat Yanbayev	(Russia)	DF	7 April 1984 (aged 19)	loan from CSKA Moscow	2003			
	Nebojša Stojković	(Serbia and Montenegro)	DF	2 June 1974 (aged 29)	Pobeda	2000		113	2
	Oleksandr Babych	(Ukraine)	DF	27 March 1979 (aged 24)	Polihraftekhnika Oleksandriya	2002			
Midfielders
	Willer	(Brazil)	MF	18 November 1979 (aged 23)	Independiente	2002			
	Gadzhi Bamatov	(Russia)	MF	16 February 1982 (aged 21)	Youth Team	1997			
	Shamil Burziyev	(Russia)	MF	1 April 1985 (aged 18)	Youth Team	2003			
	Valeri Likhobabenko	(Russia)	MF	17 February 1976 (aged 27)		2003			
	Eldar Mamayev	(Russia)	MF	14 June 1985 (aged 18)	Youth Team	2003			
	Artur Sadirov	(Russia)	MF	22 March 1985 (aged 18)	Youth Team	2003			
	Aleksei Savelyev	(Russia)	MF	10 April 1977 (aged 26)	CSKA Moscow	2002			
	Murad Ramazanov	(Russia)	MF	10 March 1979 (aged 24)	Dynamo Makhachkala	1999			
	Ruslan Agalarov	(Uzbekistan)	MF	21 February 1974 (aged 29)	Lokomotiv-Taym Mineralnye Vody	1999			
Forwards
	Robson Paolo da Silva	(Brazil)	FW	15 June 1976 (aged 27)		2003		5	0
	Valery Alekseyev	(Russia)	FW	16 February 1979 (aged 24)	Fakel Voronezh	2003			
	Budun Budunov	(Russia)	FW	4 December 1975 (aged 27)	Lokomotiv-Taym Mineralnye Vody	1999			
	Shamil Lakhiyalov	(Russia)	FW	28 October 1979 (aged 24)	Saturn	2003			
	Ishref Magomedov	(Russia)	FW	6 October 1980 (aged 23)	Torpedo Vladimir	2003			
	Magomed Magomedov	(Russia)	FW	11 December 1987 (aged 15)	Youth Team	2003			
	Sheykh Osmanov	(Russia)	FW	26 October 1984 (aged 19)	Youth Team	2003			
	Igor Strelkov	(Russia)	FW	21 March 1982 (aged 21)	Lada-Tolyatti	2003			
	Aleksandr Nikulin	(Russia)	FW	14 February 1979 (aged 24)	Zhemchuzhina-Sochi	2003			
	Akhmed Kurbanov	(Russia)	FW	22 April 1986 (aged 17)	Youth Team	2003			
Players who left during the season
16	Amel Mujčinović	(Bosnia and Herzegovina)	GK	20 November 1973 (aged 29)	NK Celje	2002		8	0

== Transfers ==
=== In ===
Date	Position	Nationality	Name	From	Fee	Ref.
Winter 2003	GK	(Russia)	Aleksandr Makarov	Zenit St.Petersburg	Undisclosed	
Winter 2003	DF	(Georgia (country))	Kakhaber Tskhadadze	Lokomotivi Tbilisi	Undisclosed	
Winter 2003	MF	(Russia)	Omari Tetradze	Alania Vladikavkaz	Undisclosed	
Winter 2003	MF	(Russia)	Valeri Likhobabenko	Unattached	Free	
Winter 2003	FW	(Brazil)	Paulo da Silva Robson		Undisclosed	
Winter 2003	FW	(Russia)	Shamil Lakhiyalov	Saturn Ramenskoye	Undisclosed	
Winter 2003	FW	(Russia)	Ishref Magomedov	Torpedo Vladimir	Undisclosed	
Winter 2003	FW	(Russia)	Igor Strelkov	Lada-Togliatti	Undisclosed	

=== Loans in ===
Date from	Position	Nationality	Name	From	Date to	Ref.
Winter 2003	DF	(Russia)	Renat Yanbayev	CSKA Moscow	End of season	

=== Out ===
Date	Position	Nationality	Name	To	Fee	Ref.
Winter 2002	DF	(Bosnia and Herzegovina)	Stevo Glogovac	Zemun	Undisclosed	
Winter 2002	DF	(Bosnia and Herzegovina)	Dženan Hošić	Szczakowianka Jaworzno	Undisclosed	
Winter 2002	DF	(Russia)	Igor Aksyonov	Kristall Smolensk	Undisclosed	
Winter 2002	GK	(Bosnia and Herzegovina)	Amir Hamzić	Zvijezda Gradačac	Undisclosed	
Winter 2002	GK	(Ukraine)	Oleksandr Mitrofanov	Tavriya Simferopol	Undisclosed	
Winter 2002	GK	(Ukraine)	Vladyslav Prudius	Sokol Saratov	Undisclosed	
Winter 2002	GK	(Bosnia and Herzegovina)	Hadis Zubanović	Velež Mostar	Undisclosed	
Winter 2002	GK	(Uzbekistan)	Jafar Irismetov	Pakhtakor Tashkent	Undisclosed	
Summer 2003	GK	(Bosnia and Herzegovina)	Amel Mujčinović	Mura	Undisclosed	

== Competitions ==
=== Overview ===
Competition	First match	Last match	Starting round	Final position	Record							
Competition	First match	Last match	Starting round	Final position	Pld	W	D	L	GF	GA	GD	Win %
First Division	29 March 2003	1 November 2003	Matchday 1	6th	42	19	13	10	52	33	+19	45.24
2002–03 Russian Cup	2 March 2003	21 May 2003	Round of 16	Semifinal	3	1	1	1	2	2	+0	33.33
2003–04 Russian Cup	24 August 2003	5 November 2003	Fourth Round	Fifth Round	3	2	0	1	5	3	+2	66.67
Total					48	22	14	12	59	38	+21	45.83

Last updated: 5 November 2003
Source: See Results

=== First Division ===
==== League table ====
Pos	Team	Pld	W	D	L	GF	GA	GD	Pts	Promotion or relegation
4	Terek Grozny	42	25	10	7	56	21	+35	85 (Note: Head-to-head record: Tom – Terek 2–1, Terek – Tom 0–1.)	Qualification to UEFA Cup second qualifying round (Note: Qualified as 2003–04 Russian Cup winners.)
5	Dynamo St. Petersburg (R)	42	23	8	11	66	37	+29	77	Relegation to Second Division (Note: Dynamo Saint Petersburg were expelled from the league due to financial irregularities)
6	Anzhi Makhachkala	42	19	13	10	52	33	+19	70	
7	Baltika Kaliningrad	42	18	10	14	58	49	+9	64	
8	Metallurg Lipetsk	42	17	11	14	53	38	+15	62	

Source: PFL, RSSSF
Rules for classification: 1st points; 2nd matches won; 3rd head-to-head (points, matches won, goal difference, goals scored, away goals scored); 4th goal difference; 5th goals scored; 6th away goals scored
(R) Relegated

==== Results ====
29 March 2003 1	Anzhi Makhachkala	2–1	Spartak Nalchik	Makhachkala
MSK (UTC+4)	Lakhiyalov 55'; Agalarov 83' (pen.)	[ Summary]	M.Ashibokov 78'	Stadium: Dynamo Stadium; Attendance: 10,500

1 April 2003 2	Terek Grozny	0–0	Anzhi Makhachkala	Pyatigorsk^{1}
MSK (UTC+4)		[ Summary]		Stadium: Central Stadium; Attendance: 3,000

10 April 2003 4	Kuban Krasnodar	1–0	Anzhi Makhachkala	Krasnodar
MSK (UTC+4)	Yermak 85'	[ Summary]		Stadium: Kuban Stadium; Attendance: 27,000

16 April 2003 5	Anzhi Makhachkala	1–0	Baltika Kaliningrad	Makhachkala
MSK (UTC+4)	Lakhiyalov 13'	[ Summary]		Stadium: Dynamo Stadium; Attendance: 7,500

19 April 2003 6	Anzhi Makhachkala	0–0	Dynamo St.Petersburg	Makhachkala
MSK (UTC+4)		[ Summary]		Stadium: Dynamo Stadium; Attendance: 7,000

25 April 2003 7	Amkar Perm	0–0	Anzhi Makhachkala	Perm
MSK (UTC+4)		[ Summary]		Stadium: Zvezda Stadium; Attendance: 9,800

28 April 2003 8	Ural Sverdlovsk Oblast	0–0	Anzhi Makhachkala	Yekaterinburg
MSK (UTC+4)		[ Summary]		Stadium: Central Stadium; Attendance: 4,000

5 May 2003 9	Anzhi Makhachkala	2–0	Sokol Saratov	Makhachkala
MSK (UTC+4)	Savelyev 4'; Budunov 8'	[ Summary]		Stadium: Dynamo Stadium; Attendance: 8,000

8 May 2003 10	Anzhi Makhachkala	3–0	Volgar Gazprom	Makhachkala
MSK (UTC+4)	Nikulin 12'; Budunov 41'; Ramazanov 90'	[ Summary]		Stadium: Dynamo Stadium; Attendance: 8,000

14 May 2003 11	Lada-Togliatti	0–0	Anzhi Makhachkala	Tolyatti
MSK (UTC+4)		[ Summary]		Stadium: Torpedo Stadium; Attendance: 2,000

17 May 2003 12	Lisma-Mordovia Saransk	0–0	Anzhi Makhachkala	Saransk
MSK (UTC+4)		[ Summary]		Stadium: Start Stadium; Attendance: 12,000

24 May 2003 13	Anzhi Makhachkala	5–3	Neftekhimik Nizhnekamsk	Makhachkala
MSK (UTC+4)	Mzhavanadze 20'; Agalarov 45' (pen.); Budunov 55'; Stojković 65'; Lakhiyalov 84'	[ Summary]	V.Ulyanytskyi 45'; Anisakharov 73', 78'	Stadium: Dynamo Stadium; Attendance: 7,000

27 May 2003 14	Anzhi Makhachkala	1–0	Gazovik-Gazprom Izhevsk	Makhachkala
MSK (UTC+4)	Lakhiyalov 59'	[ Summary]		Stadium: Dynamo Stadium; Attendance: 5,500

2 June 2003 15	Kristall Smolensk	0–0	Anzhi Makhachkala	Smolensk
MSK (UTC+4)		[ Summary]		Stadium: Spartak Stadium; Attendance: 8,000

5 June 2003 16	Khimki	0–0	Anzhi Makhachkala	Khimki
MSK (UTC+4)		[ Summary]		Stadium: Rodina Stadium; Attendance: 3,200

12 June 2003 17	Anzhi Makhachkala	3–1	Lokomotov Chita	Makhachkala
MSK (UTC+4)	Strelkov 22'; Lakhiyalov 42'; Savelyev 54'	[ Summary]	O.Sukharev 56' (pen.)	Stadium: Dynamo Stadium; Attendance: 7,000

15 June 2003 18	Anzhi Makhachkala	1–1	SKA-Energiya Khabarovsk	Makhachkala
MSK (UTC+4)	Agalarov 28'	[ Summary]	Karmazinenko 80'	Stadium: Dynamo Stadium; Attendance: 7,500

22 June 2003 19	Metallurg Lipetsk	2–1	Anzhi Makhachkala	Lipetsk
MSK (UTC+4)	Petukhov 9' (pen.); Zhukovskiy 45'	[ Summary]	Nikulin 77'	Stadium: Metallurg Stadium; Attendance: 7,200

25 June 2003 20	Fakel Voronezh	3–1	Anzhi Makhachkala	Voronezh
MSK (UTC+4)	Alkhimov 43'; Oleg Elyshev 60', 83'	[ Summary]	Agalarov 38'	Stadium: Trade Unions Central Stadium; Attendance: 9,000

2 July 2003 21	Anzhi Makhachkala	1–0	Tom Tomsk	Makhachkala
MSK (UTC+4)	Savelyev 43'	[ Summary]		Stadium: Dynamo Stadium; Attendance: 8,000

5 July 2003 22	Anzhi Makhachkala	2–1	Metallurg Novokuznetsk	Makhachkala
MSK (UTC+4)	Agalarov 32' (pen.); Babych 70'	[ Summary]	V.Lange 53'	Stadium: Dynamo Stadium; Attendance: 6,500

22 July 2003 24	Anzhi Makhachkala	1–0	Kuban Krasnodar	Kaspiysk^{2}
MSK (UTC+4)	Nikulin 48'	[ Summary]		Stadium: Khazar Stadium; Attendance: 12,000

28 July 2003 25	Baltika Kaliningrad	2–3	Anzhi Makhachkala	Kaliningrad
MSK (UTC+4)	R.Gibadullin 55'; Dementyev 76' (pen.)	[ Summary]	Lakhiyalov 21'; Budunov 73', 90' (pen.)	Stadium: Baltika Stadium; Attendance: 3,000

31 July 2003 26	Dynamo St.Petersburg	2–0	Anzhi Makhachkala	Saint Petersburg
MSK (UTC+4)	Baskov 4' (pen.); A.Mikhailov 28'	[ Summary]		Stadium: MSA of Petrovsky; Attendance: 9,500

7 August 2003 27	Anzhi Makhachkala	1–1	Amkar Perm	Kaspiysk^{2}
MSK (UTC+4)	Strelkov 68'	[ Summary]	Mitin 24'	Stadium: Khazar Stadium; Attendance: 10,000

10 August 2003 28	Anzhi Makhachkala	1–1	Ural Sverdlovsk Oblast	Kaspiysk^{2}
MSK (UTC+4)	Tskhadadze 26'	[ Summary]	Salnikov 23'	Stadium: Khazar Stadium; Attendance: 9,000

17 August 2003 29	Sokol Saratov	1–3	Anzhi Makhachkala	Saratov
MSK (UTC+4)	Fedkov 27'	[ Summary]	Nikulin 33'; Budunov 49'; Strelkov 87'	Stadium: Lokomotiv Stadium; Attendance: 7,000

20 August 2003 30	Volgar Astrakhan	2–0	Anzhi Makhachkala	Astrakhan
MSK (UTC+4)	R.Prokopenko 67'; Fomenka 78'	[ Summary]		Stadium: Central Stadium; Attendance: 8,000

28 August 2003 31	Anzhi Makhachkala	6–0	Lada-Togliatti	Kaspiysk^{2}
MSK (UTC+4)	Strelkov 6'; Alekseyev 19', 53'; Yanbayev 41'; Magomedov 69'; Budunov 86' (pen.)	[ Summary]		Stadium: Khazar Stadium; Attendance: 6,500

31 August 2003 32	Anzhi Makhachkala	2–0	Lisma-Mordovia Saransk	Kaspiysk^{2}
MSK (UTC+4)	Lakhiyalov 39' (pen.); Savelyev 83'	[ Summary]		Stadium: Khazar Stadium; Attendance: 9,000

7 September 2003 33	Neftekhimik Nizhnekamsk	0–1	Anzhi Makhachkala	Nizhnekamsk
MSK (UTC+4)		[ Summary]	Strelkov 65'	Stadium: Neftekhimik Stadium; Attendance: 2,000

10 September 2003 34	Gazovik-Gazprom Izhevsk	0–0	Anzhi Makhachkala	Izhevsk
MSK (UTC+4)		[ Summary]		Stadium: Central Stadium; Attendance: 1,500

17 September 2003 35	Anzhi Makhachkala	3–1	Kristall Smolensk	Kaspiysk^{2}
MSK (UTC+4)	Budunov 28' (pen.); Akayev 62'; Tetradze 88'	[ Summary]	Ishchenko 9'	Stadium: Khazar Stadium; Attendance: 8,000

20 September 2003 36	Anzhi Makhachkala	3–0	Khimki	Kaspiysk^{2}
MSK (UTC+4)	Willer 35'; Lakhiyalov 83'; Magomedov 88'	[ Summary]		Stadium: Khazar Stadium; Attendance: 9,000

27 September 2003 37	Lokomotiv Chita	2–1	Anzhi Makhachkala	Chita
MSK (UTC+4)	M.Shvetsov 41', 73'	[ Summary]	Strelkov 90'	Stadium: Lokomotiv Stadium; Attendance: 8,200

30 September 2003 38	SKA-Energiya Khabarovsk	0–1	Anzhi Makhachkala	Khabarovsk
MSK (UTC+4)		[ Summary]	Strelkov 48'	Stadium: Lenin Stadium; Attendance: 8,000

7 October 2003 39	Anzhi Makhachkala	0–0	Metallurg Lipetsk	Kaspiysk^{2}
MSK (UTC+4)		[ Summary]		Stadium: Khazar Stadium; Attendance: 7,000

10 October 2003 40	Anzhi Makhachkala	3–1	Fakel Voronezh	Kaspiysk^{2}
MSK (UTC+4)	Lakhiyalov 8'; Budunov 56' (pen.), 67'	[ Summary]	Ivanov 90'	Stadium: Khazar Stadium; Attendance: 5,800

18 October 2003 41	Tom Tomsk	2–0	Anzhi Makhachkala	Tomsk
MSK (UTC+4)	Rekhtin 28'; Perednya 40'	[ Summary]		Stadium: Trud Stadium; Attendance: 10,000

21 October 2003 42	Metallurg Novokuznetsk	2–0	Anzhi Makhachkala	Novokuznetsk
MSK (UTC+4)	O.Stepanov 70', 79'	[ Summary]		Stadium: Metallurg Stadium; Attendance: 1,500

29 October 2003 43	Anzhi Makhachkala	0–1	Terek Grozny	Kaspiysk^{2}
MSK (UTC+4)		[ Summary]	Kiselyov 79'	Stadium: Khazar Stadium; Attendance: 2,000

1 November 2003 44	Spartak Nalchik	2–0	Anzhi Makhachkala	Nalchik
MSK (UTC+4)	Kuzmichyov 32'; Ovchinnikov 34'	[ Summary]		Stadium: Spartak Stadium; Attendance: 400

=== Russian Cup ===
==== 2002–03 ====
2 March 2003 Round of 16	Anzhi Makhachkala	1–0	Lokomotiv Moscow	Makhachkala
MSK (UTC+4)	Lakhiyalov 89'	[ Summary]		Stadium: Dynamo Stadium

19 March 2003 Quarterfinals	Anzhi Makhachkala	1–1 (a.e.t.) (4–2 p)	Krylia Sovetov	Makhachkala
MSK (UTC+4)	Agalarov 35'	[ Summary]	Poškus 72'	Stadium: Dynamo Stadium
	Penalties
	Willer (penalty scored); Agalarov (penalty scored); Likhobabenko (penalty scored); Lakhiyalov (penalty scored)		Tikhonov (penalty scored); Souza (penalty scored); Poškus (penalty missed); Kouba (penalty missed)

21 May 2003 Semifinal	Anzhi Makhachkala	0–1	Rostov	Makhachkala
MSK (UTC+4)		[ Summary]	Kanyenda 71'	Stadium: Dynamo Stadium; Attendance: 14,700

==== 2003–04 ====
24 August 2003 Fourth round	Anzhi Makhachkala	2–0	Sokol Saratov	Kaspiysk^{2}
MSK (UTC+4)	Alekseyev 10', 44'	[ Summary]		Stadium: Khazar Stadium; Attendance: 7,500

14 October 2003 Fifth round 1st leg	Anzhi Makhachkala	3–1	Rotor Volgograd	Kaspiysk^{2}
MSK (UTC+4)	Savelyev 41', 72' (pen.); Lakhiyalov 66'	[ Summary]	Romanov 86'	Stadium: Khazar Stadium; Attendance: 8,000

5 November 2003 Fifth round 1st leg	Rotor Volgograd	2–0 ((a)3–3 agg.)	Anzhi Makhachkala	Volgograd
MSK (UTC+4)	Bondarenko 67'; Yesipov 84' (pen.)	[ Summary]		Stadium: Central Stadium; Attendance: 5,500

== Squad statistics ==
=== Appearances and goals ===
No.	Pos	Nat	Player	Total		First Division		2002-03 Russian Cup		2003-04 Russian Cup	
No.	Pos	Nat	Player	Apps	Goals	Apps	Goals	Apps	Goals	Apps	Goals
	GK	(Russia) RUS	Sergey Armishev	21	0	21	0	0	0	0	0
	GK	(Russia) RUS	Aleksandr Makarov	21	0	21	0	0	0	0	0
	DF	(Georgia (country)) GEO	Kakhaber Mzhavanadze	38	2	38	2	0	0	0	0
	DF	(Georgia (country)) GEO	Kakhaber Tskhadadze	22	0	22	0	0	0	0	0
	DF	(Russia) RUS	Arsen Akayev	30	1	30	1	0	0	0	0
	DF	(Russia) RUS	Andrei Gordeyev	31	0	31	0	0	0	0	0
	DF	(Russia) RUS	Rasim Tagirbekov	1	0	1	0	0	0	0	0
	DF	(Russia) RUS	Omari Tetradze	40	1	40	1	0	0	0	0
	DF	(Russia) RUS	Renat Yanbayev	20	1	20	1	0	0	0	0
	DF	(Serbia and Montenegro) SCG	Nebojša Stojković	31	1	31	1	0	0	0	0
	DF	(Ukraine) UKR	Oleksandr Babych	29	1	29	1	0	0	0	0
	MF	(Brazil) BRA	Willer	15	1	15	1	0	0	0	0
	MF	(Russia) RUS	Gadzhi Bamatov	10	0	10	0	0	0	0	0
	MF	(Russia) RUS	Shamil Burziyev	1	0	1	0	0	0	0	0
	MF	(Russia) RUS	Valeri Likhobabenko	22	0	22	0	0	0	0	0
	MF	(Russia) RUS	Eldar Mamayev	1	0	1	0	0	0	0	0
	MF	(Russia) RUS	Aleksei Savelyev	35	4	35	4	0	0	0	0
	MF	(Russia) RUS	Murad Ramazanov	15	1	15	1	0	0	0	0
	MF	(Uzbekistan) UZB	Ruslan Agalarov	40	5	40	5	0	0	0	0
	FW	(Brazil) BRA	Paulo da Silva Robson	4	0	4	0	0	0	0	0
	FW	(Russia) RUS	Valery Alekseyev	21	2	21	2	0	0	0	0
	FW	(Russia) RUS	Budun Budunov	40	10	40	10	0	0	0	0
	FW	(Russia) RUS	Shamil Lakhiyalov	40	9	40	9	0	0	0	0
	FW	(Russia) RUS	Ishref Magomedov	4	0	4	0	0	0	0	0
	FW	(Russia) RUS	Magomed Magomedov	7	2	7	2	0	0	0	0
	FW	(Russia) RUS	Igor Strelkov	34	7	34	7	0	0	0	0
	FW	(Russia) RUS	Aleksandr Nikulin	37	4	37	4	0	0	0	0
	FW	(Russia) RUS	Akhmed Kurbanov	1	0	1	0	0	0	0	0
Players who appeared for Anzhi Makhachkala but left during the season:
	GK	(Bosnia and Herzegovina) BIH	Amel Mujčinović	2	0	2	0	0	0	0	0

=== Goal scorers ===
Place	Position	Nation	Number	Name	First Division	2002-03 Russian Cup	2003-04 Russian Cup	Total
1	FW	(Russia)		Shamil Lakhiyalov	9	1	1	11
2	FW	(Russia)		Budun Budunov	10	0	0	10
3	FW	(Russia)		Igor Strelkov	7	0	0	7
4	MF	(Uzbekistan)		Ruslan Agalarov	5	1	0	6
4	MF	(Russia)		Aleksei Savelyev	4	0	2	6
6	FW	(Russia)		Aleksandr Nikulin	4	0	0	4
6	FW	(Russia)		Valery Alekseyev	2	0	2	4
8	FW	(Russia)		Magomed Magomedov	2	0	0	2
8	DF	(Georgia (country))		Kakhaber Mzhavanadze	2	0	0	2
10	FW	(Russia)		Murad Ramazanov	1	0	0	1
10	DF	(Serbia and Montenegro)		Nebojša Stojković	1	0	0	1
10	DF	(Ukraine)		Oleksandr Babych	1	0	0	1
10	DF	(Russia)		Renat Yanbayev	1	0	0	1
10	DF	(Russia)		Arsen Akayev	1	0	0	1
10	DF	(Russia)		Omari Tetradze	1	0	0	1
10	MF	(Brazil)		Willer	1	0	0	1
				TOTALS	52	2	5	59

=== Clean sheets ===
Place	Position	Nation	Number	Name	First Division	2002-03 Russian Cup	2003-04 Russian Cup	Total
1	GK	(Russia)		Sergey Armishev				
1	GK	(Russia)		Aleksandr Makarov				
				TOTALS	21	1	1	23

== Notes ==
- Terek Grozny played their home games at the Central Stadium in Pyatigorsk due to the War in Chechnya.
- From round 24 onwards, Anzhi played their home gets at their new Khazar Stadium.
