= Magomedov =

Magomedov, also Magomadov (Cyrillic: Магомедов or Магомадов, Masculine) or Magomedova (Magomadova, Feminine) is a predominantly Chechen and Dagestani surname. It is derived from the male given name Magomed (equivalent of Arabic given name Muhammad) and literally means Magomed's. It may refer to:

- Apti Magomedov (born 1968), Moldovan judoka of Chechen descent
- Chingiz Magomadov (born 1998), Russian football player
- Davud Magomedov (1970–2005), Azerbaijani Olympic wrestler
- Fariza Magomadova (born 1925), Russian teacher of Chechen descent
- Ishref Magomedov (born 1980), Russian football player
- Khadzhimurad Magomedov (born 1974), Russian wrestler, Olympic and World champion
- Magomed Magomedov (disambiguation), multiple people
- Magomedali Magomedov, chairman of the State Council of the Republic of Dagestan from 1987 to 2006
- Magomedsalam Magomedov (born 1964), the President of Dagestan, a federal subject of the Russian Federation in the North Caucasus
- Murad Magomedov (born 1973), Russian-Azerbaijan-Israeli football player
- Ramazan Magomedov, Belarusian amateur boxer
- Rashid Magomedov (born 1984), Russian amateur boxer & mixed martial artist
- Ruslan Magomedov (born 1986), Russian mixed martial artist
- Ruslan Magomedov (economist), the Chairman of the National Commission on Securities and Stock Market (Ukraine)
- Sapiyat Magomedova (born 1979), Russian human rights activist and lawyer from Dagestan
- Sharabutdin Magomedov (born 1994), Russian mixed martial artist
- Umalat Magomedov (born 1979), former leader of the militant Shariat Jamaat organisation in Dagestan
- Valiabdula Magomedov (born 1986), Russian professional football player
- Ziyavudin Magomedov (born 1968), Russian businessman
