= 2008 Belarusian Premier League =

Belarusian Premier League
- Season: 2008
- Champions: BATE Borisov
- Relegated: Lokomotiv Minsk; Savit Mogilev; Darida Minsk Raion
- Champions League: BATE Borisov
- Europa League: Naftan Novopolotsk; Dinamo Minsk; MTZ-RIPO Minsk
- Matches: 240
- Goals: 621 (2.59 per match)
- Top goalscorer: (Belarus) Gennadi Bliznyuk (16) (Belarus) Vitali Rodionov (16)
- Biggest home win: BATE 5–0 Shakhtyor; Dnepr 5–0 Smorgon
- Biggest away win: 2–6 – 1 game; 0–4 – 4 games
- Highest scoring: Darida 3–6 MTZ-RIPO

The 2008 Belarusian Premier League was the 18th season of top-tier football in Belarus. It started on April 6 and ended on November 16, 2008. BATE Borisov were the defending champions.

== Team changes from 2007 season ==
Due to league expansion from 14 to 16 teams the only relegated team Minsk, who finished last in 2007, was replaced by three best teams of 2007 First League: Savit Mogilev, Granit Mikashevichi and Lokomotiv Minsk.

== Overview ==
BATE Borisov won their 5th champions title and qualified for the next season's Champions League. The championship runners-up Dinamo Minsk, bronze medalists MTZ-RIPO Minsk and 2008–09 Cup winners Naftan Novopolotsk qualified for the inaugural tournament of Europa League. Due to decision to gradually reduce Premiere League to 12 clubs (14 in 2009, 12 in 2010) three lowest placed teams (Lokomotiv Minsk, Savit Mogilev and Darida Minsk Raion) relegated to the First League. The two latter teams disbanded prior to 2009 season.

== Teams and venues ==
Location of teams in 2008 Belarusian Premier League

Team	Location	Venue	Capacity	Position in 2007
BATE	Borisov	City Stadium (Borisov)	5,392	1
Gomel	Gomel	Central Stadium	14,307	2
Shakhtyor	Soligorsk	Stroitel Stadium	4,200	3
Torpedo	Zhodino	City Stadium (Borisov)	5,392	4
MTZ-RIPO	Minsk	Traktor Stadium	17,600	5
Neman	Grodno	Neman Stadium	6,300	6
Naftan	Novopolotsk	Atlant Stadium	5,300	7
Vitebsk	Vitebsk	Vitebsky CSK	8,350	8
Dinamo Minsk	Minsk	Dinamo Stadium	40,000	9
Smorgon	Smorgon	Yunost Stadium	3,200	10
Darida	Minsk Raion	Darida Stadium	4,500	11
Dinamo Brest	Brest	OSK Brestskiy	10,080	12
Dnepr	Mogilev	Torpedo Stadium (Mogilev)	3,500	13
Savit	Mogilev	Torpedo Stadium (Mogilev)	3,500	First league, 1
Granit	Mikashevichi	OSK Brestskiy (Brest)	10,080	First league, 2
Lokomotiv	Minsk	City Stadium (Molodechno)	4,800	First league, 3

1. Due to renovation works at Torpedo Stadium in Zhodino, Torpedo spent most of the season at City Stadium in Borisov. In addition, one game was played at City Stadium in Molodechno and two games at Spartak Stadium in Bobruisk.
2. One game played at Torpedo Stadium in Minsk.
3. Due to renovation works at Spartak Stadium in Mogilev, Dnepr spent the season at Torpedo Stadium in Mogilev.
4. Granit spent the season at OSK Brestskiy in Brest, as their own ground Polesye Stadium in Luninets was closed for renovation.
5. Lokomotiv Minsk spent the season at City Stadium in Molodechno, as their own ground Lokomotiv Stadium did not meet Premier League criteria.

== Table ==
Pos	Team	Pld	W	D	L	GF	GA	GD	Pts	Qualification or relegation
1	BATE Borisov (C)	30	19	10	1	54	20	+34	67	Qualification for Champions League second qualifying round
2	Dinamo Minsk	30	19	5	6	49	29	+20	62	Qualification for Europa League first qualifying round
3	MTZ-RIPO Minsk	30	17	6	7	65	37	+28	57	Qualification for Europa League first qualifying round
4	Shakhtyor Soligorsk	30	15	6	9	50	35	+15	51	
5	Vitebsk	30	14	9	7	39	26	+13	51	
6	Dinamo Brest	30	13	8	9	40	34	+6	47	
7	Naftan Novopolotsk	30	13	7	10	41	35	+6	46	Qualification for Europa League second qualifying round (Note: Naftan Novopolotsk qualified for the Europa League second qualifying round by winning the 2008–09 Belarusian Cup.)
8	Smorgon	30	10	9	11	26	39	−13	39	
9	Dnepr Mogilev	30	9	11	10	45	42	+3	38	
10	Granit Mikashevichi	30	8	12	10	35	34	+1	36	
11	Gomel	30	9	6	15	35	47	−12	33	
12	Neman Grodno	30	8	9	13	36	40	−4	33	
13	Torpedo Zhodino	30	7	10	13	25	36	−11	31	
14	Lokomotiv Minsk (R)	30	6	7	17	28	50	−22	25	Relegation to Belarusian First League
15	Savit Mogilev (R)	30	5	6	19	28	61	−33	21	Relegation to Belarusian First League
16	Darida Minsk Raion (R)	30	4	7	19	25	56	−31	19	Relegation to Belarusian First League

Source: rsssf.com
Rules for classification: 1st points; 2nd matches won; 3rd head-to-head
(C) Champions; (R) Relegated

== Results ==
Home \ Away	BAT	DAR	DBR	DMI	DNE	GOM	GRA	LMN	MTZ	NAF	NEM	SAV	SHA	SMR	VIT	TZH
BATE Borisov		1–0	1–0	2–0	2–2	2–0	1–1	1–0	4–3	2–1	0–0	3–0	5–0	2–2	1–1	2–1
Darida Minsk Raion	0–2		1–4	0–3	2–1	2–1	0–3 (Note: The match of Round 27 was awarded as a 3–0 win for Granit as Darida boycotted the game due to a conflict with BFF over bad refereeing.)	0–2	3–6	0–3	2–1	0–1	0–2	0–1	1–0	1–1
Dinamo Brest	1–3	2–1		1–1	0–0	1–0	1–1	1–0	0–2	0–2	1–1	4–1	2–1	0–0	1–0	2–0
Dinamo Minsk	2–1	2–2	1–4		1–0	3–1	1–1	2–1	2–0	3–0	3–0	3–2	1–0	2–1	1–2	0–1
Dnepr Mogilev	3–3	2–1	2–1	3–1		1–1	0–1	2–1	1–2	1–1	2–1	1–1	2–2	5–0	1–1	2–1
Gomel	0–2	2–0	2–0	0–2	4–3		2–4	1–0	2–1	3–2	2–2	1–0	2–6	0–1	1–2	0–1
Granit Mikashevichi	2–2	1–1	2–2	2–3	2–3	1–1		0–1	1–3	3–1	1–1	1–0	0–0	3–0	1–4	0–0
Lokomotiv Minsk	0–3	2–2	2–0	2–2	2–1	0–0	0–0		0–3	4–0	0–4	2–0	0–4	1–2	0–3	1–1
MTZ-RIPO Minsk	0–0	3–3	4–0	0–1	3–1	3–1	2–0	3–1		0–2	1–1	6–2	1–1	1–0	1–2	4–2
Naftan Novopolotsk	1–2	1–0	0–0	1–1	2–0	1–2	1–0	2–1	2–3		1–0	2–0	1–1	3–1	0–0	0–0
Neman Grodno	0–2	2–1	1–2	0–1	2–1	1–0	0–1	2–1	1–1	1–2		1–1	1–2	0–0	2–1	1–0
Savit Mogilev	0–1	1–1	1–4	1–4	1–1	2–0	0–0	2–1	1–2	1–4	3–5		0–4	2–0	1–2	0–2
Shakhtyor Soligorsk	0–2	1–0	0–2	0–1	0–0	1–1	1–0	3–1	2–1	3–0	3–2	3–4		0–1	2–1	1–0
Smorgon	0–0	3–1	2–3	0–1	1–0	2–1	1–0	0–0	1–1	2–1	2–2	0–0	0–4		0–3	0–0
Vitebsk	0–2	0–0	1–0	1–0	2–4	1–1	2–1	0–0	0–3	1–1	1–0	2–0	3–0	2–0		0–0
Torpedo Zhodino	0–0	2–0	1–1	0–1	0–0	0–3	0–2	6–2	0–2	0–3	2–1	1–0	1–3	1–3	1–1	

Source: football.by (in Belarusian)
Legend: Blue = home team win; Yellow = draw; Red = away team win.

== Belarusian clubs in European Cups ==
Round	Team #1	Agg.	Team #2	1st leg	2nd leg
2008 UEFA Intertoto Cup
First round	Cracovia (Poland)	1–5	(Belarus) Shakhtyor Soligorsk	1–2	0–3
Second round	Sturm Graz (Austria)	2–0	(Belarus) Shakhtyor Soligorsk	2–0	0–0
2008–09 UEFA Cup
First qualifying round	Legia Warszawa (Poland)	4–1	(Belarus) Gomel	0–0	4–1
First qualifying round	MTZ-RIPO Minsk (Belarus)	2–3	(Slovakia) Žilina	2–2	0–1
2008–09 UEFA Champions League
First qualifying round	BATE Borisov (Belarus)	3–0	(Iceland) Valur	2–0	1–0
Second qualifying round	Anderlecht (Belgium)	3–4	(Belarus) BATE Borisov	1–2	2–2
Thind qualifying round	Levski Sofia (Bulgaria)	1–2	(Belarus) BATE Borisov	0–1	1–1
Group stage	Real Madrid (Spain)	3–0	(Belarus) BATE Borisov	2–0	1–0
Group stage	BATE Borisov (Belarus)	2–2	(Italy) Juventus	2–2	0–0
Group stage	Zenit St. Petersburg (Russia)	3–1	(Belarus) BATE Borisov	1–1	2–0

== Top scorers ==
Rank	Name	Team	Goals
1	(Belarus) Gennadi Bliznyuk	BATE Borisov	16
1	(Belarus) Vitali Rodionov	BATE Borisov	16
3	(Belarus) Artem Kontsevoy	MTZ-RIPO Minsk	15
4	(Belarus) Alyaksandr Hawrushka	Dnepr Mogilev	14
5	(Belarus) Dzmitry Mazalewski	Dinamo Brest	13
5	(Belarus) Ruslan Usaw	Vitebsk	13
7	(Belarus) Andrey Sherakow	Torpedo Zhodino	12
8	(Belarus) Oleg Strakhanovich	MTZ-RIPO Minsk	11
8	(Belarus) Andrey Tsevan	Dinamo Brest	11
10	(Russia) Aleksandr Alumona	Neman Grodno	10
10	(Belarus) Dzmitry Kavalyonak	Neman Grodno	10
10	(Slovakia) Róbert Rák	Dinamo Minsk	10

== See also ==
- 2008 Belarusian First League
- 2007–08 Belarusian Cup
- 2008–09 Belarusian Cup
