= Zhidkov =

Zhidkov (Russian: Жидков) is a Russian masculine surname; its feminine counterpart is Zhidkova. The surname originates either from an adjective zhidkii, which meant weak, poor in old Russian, or from the noun zhid, meaning a greedy person. Notable people with the surname include:

- Aleksandr Zhidkov (born 1965), Azerbaijani footballer and coach
- Aleksandr Valentinovich Zhidkov (born 1966), Russian footballer
- Katerina Zhidkova (born 1989), Ukrainian-born Azerbaijani volleyball player
