= Edu (footballer, born 1974) =

Brazilian footballer

Personal information
- Full name: Eduardo Araújo Moreira
- Date of birth: 19 April 1974 (age 52)
- Place of birth: Ipauçu, Brazil
- Height: 1.69 m (5 ft 7 in)
- Position: Midfielder

Youth career
- São Paulo

Senior career*
Years	Team	Apps	(Gls)
1991–1992	Palmeiras		
1993–1996	Rio Branco		
1996–1997	Monterrey		
1998	Platinense		
1998–1999	Alania Vladikavkaz	37	(9)
2000	Spartak-Chukotka Moscow	12	(1)
2000–2001	Krylia Sovetov Samara	14	(1)
2001	→ Anzhi Makhachkala (loan)	12	(2)
2002–2003	Arsenal Kyiv	0	(0)
2003–2004	Torpedo-SKA Minsk	41	(19)
2005–2008	Dinamo Minsk	86	(18)
2011–2012	Santacruzense		
- * Club domestic league appearances and goals

Eduardo Araújo Moreira (born 19 April 1974) commonly known as Edu is a retired Brazilian footballer who played as a midfielder.

== Career ==
=== Eastern Europe ===
Edu joined Alania Vladikavkaz of the Russian Premier League in July 1998. He played for Spartak-Chukotka Moscow of the Russian First Division in the first half of the 2000 season. He then spent one year at Krylia Sovetov Samara, and the rest of the 2001 season at Anzhi Makhachkala.

Edu then moved to Ukraine to play for Arsenal Kyiv in second half of 2001-02 season and 2002-03 season.

Edu joined Belarusian team Torpedo Minsk in August 2003. As the club was expelled from the league at the start of 2005 season, he joined Dinamo Minsk.

In July 2011 he returned to Brazil and signed a contract with Santacruzense. .

== Career statistics ==
Club statistics
Season	Club	League	League		Cup		Other		Total	
Season	Club	League	App	Goals	App	Goals	App	Goals	App	Goals
1998	Alania Vladikavkaz	RFPL	14	5			-		14	5
1999	Alania Vladikavkaz	RFPL	24	4			-		24	4
2000	Spartak-Chukotka Moscow	RFNL	12	1			-		12	1
2000	Krylia Sovetov	RFPL	13	1	2	0	-		15	1
2001	Krylia Sovetov	RFPL	1	0	0	0	-		1	0
2001	Anzhi Makhachkala	RFPL	12	2	2	0	1	0	15	2
2002–03	Arsenal Kyiv	UPL	0	0			-		0	0
2003	Torpedo Minsk	BPL	13	7			-		13	7
2004	Torpedo Minsk	BPL	28	12			-		28	12
2005	Dinamo Minsk	BPL	21	3			-		21	3
2006	Dinamo Minsk	BPL	24	10			-		24	10
2007	Dinamo Minsk	BPL	22	0			-		22	0
2008	Dinamo Minsk	BPL	17	5			-		17	5
Total	Russia		76	13	4	0	1	0	81	13
Total	Belarus		125	37			-		125	37
Total			201	50	4	0	1	0	206	50
