= Aleksandr Zhidkov =

Aleksandr Zhidkov may refer to:

- Aleksandr Zhidkov (footballer, born 1965), Azerbaijani football manager and former goalkeeper
- Aleksandr Zhidkov (footballer, born 1966), Russian football midfielder
