= 2008 Belarusian First League =

Belarusian First League
- Season: 2008
- Champions: Minsk
- Promoted: Minsk
- Relegated: PMC Postavy

2008 Belarusian First League was the 18th season of 2nd level football championship in Belarus. It started in April and ended in November 2008.

== Team changes from 2007 season ==
Three top teams of last season (Savit Mogilev, Granit Mikashevichi and Lokomotiv Minsk) were promoted to Belarusian Premier League. Due to expansion of Premier League, the promoted teams were replaced by only one team that finished at the bottom of 2007 Belarusian Premier League table (Minsk).

One team that finished at the bottom of 2007 season table (Zvezda-BGU Minsk) relegated to the Second League. To compensate for the Premier League expansion, they were replaced by three best teams of 2007 Second League (PMC Postavy, Lida and Spartak Shklov).

Mozyr changed their name to Slavia Mozyr prior to the season.

== Teams and locations ==
Location of teams in 2008 Belarusian First League

Team	Location	Position in 2007
Minsk	Minsk	Premier League, 13
Belshina	Bobruisk	4
Khimik	Svetlogorsk	5
Veras	Nesvizh	6
Volna	Pinsk	7
Dinamo-Belcard	Grodno	8
Baranovichi	Baranovichi	9
Vedrich-97	Rechitsa	10
Polotsk	Polotsk	11
Kommunalnik	Slonim	12
Slavia	Mozyr	13
PMC	Postavy	Second League, 1
Lida	Lida	Second League, 2
Spartak	Shklov	Second League, 3

== League table ==
Pos	Team	Pld	W	D	L	GF	GA	GD	Pts	Promotion or relegation
1	Minsk (P)	26	23	2	1	72	11	+61	71	Promotion to Belarusian Premier League
2	Khimik Svetlogorsk	26	18	3	5	42	23	+19	57	
3	Belshina Bobruisk	26	15	4	7	34	21	+13	49	
4	Volna Pinsk	26	15	3	8	39	25	+14	48	
5	Veras Nesvizh	26	14	4	8	37	23	+14	46	
6	Vedrich-97 Rechitsa	26	12	3	11	39	34	+5	39	
7	Dinamo-Belcard Grodno	26	11	2	13	38	32	+6	35	
8	Spartak Shklov	26	8	6	12	28	37	−9	30	
9	Baranovichi	26	7	5	14	24	40	−16	26	
10	Kommunalnik Slonim	26	6	7	13	21	36	−15	25 (Note: Kommunalnik Slonim placed above Lida by better head-to-head record (1–0, 1–1).)	
11	Lida	26	6	7	13	24	45	−21	25	
12	Polotsk	26	6	5	15	20	36	−16	23 (Note: Polotsk placed above Slavia Mozyr by better head-to-head record (2–3, 3–1).)	
13	Slavia Mozyr	26	6	5	15	33	62	−29	23	
14	PMC Postavy (R)	26	4	6	16	22	48	−26	18	Relegation to Belarusian Second League

Source: rsssf.com
Rules for classification: 1st points; 2nd matches won; 3rd head-to-head (points, matches won, goal difference, goals scored); 4th goal difference; 5th goals scored.
(P) Promoted; (R) Relegated

== Top goalscorers ==
Rank	Goalscorer	Team	Goals
1	(Belarus) Syarhey Koshal	Minsk	16
2	(Belarus) Sergey Zabolotsky	Khimik Svetlogorsk	15
3	(Belarus) Dzmitry Asipenka	Minsk	14
3	(Belarus) Dmitri Khlebosolov	Baranovichi	14
5	(Belarus) Anatoly Tikhonchik	Veras Nesvizh	13

== See also ==
- 2008 Belarusian Premier League
- 2007–08 Belarusian Cup
- 2008–09 Belarusian Cup
