= 2007 Belarusian First League =

Belarusian First League
- Season: 2007
- Champions: Savit Mogilev
- Promoted: Savit Mogilev; Granit Mikashevichi; Lokomotiv Minsk
- Relegated: Zvezda-BGU Minsk
- Matches: 180
- Goals: 465 (2.58 per match)

2007 Belarusian First League was the 17th season of 2nd level football championship in Belarus. It started in April and ended in November 2007.

== Team changes from 2006 season ==
Two top teams of last season (Minsk and Smorgon) were promoted to Belarusian Premier League. They were replaced by two teams that finished at the bottom of 2006 Belarusian Premier League table (Lokomotiv Minsk and Belshina Bobruisk).

Two teams that finished at the bottom of 2006 season table (Lida and Bereza) relegated to the Second League. They were replaced by two best teams of 2006 Second League (Dinamo-Belcard Grodno and Savit Mogilev).

Mikashevichi changed their name to Granit Mikashevichi and Mozyr-ZLiN to FC Mozyr prior to the season.

== Teams and locations ==
Location of teams in 2007 Belarusian First League

Team	Location	Position in 2006
Lokomotiv	Minsk	Premier League, 13
Belshina	Bobruisk	Premier League, 14
Khimik	Svetlogorsk	3
Mozyr	Mozyr	4
Granit	Mikashevichi	5
Polotsk	Polotsk	6
Vedrich-97	Rechitsa	7
Volna	Pinsk	8
Veras	Nesvizh	9
Baranovichi	Baranovichi	10
Kommunalnik	Slonim	11
Zvezda-BGU	Minsk	12
Dinamo-Belcard	Grodno	Second League, 1
Savit	Mogilev	Second League, 2

== League table ==
Pos	Team	Pld	W	D	L	GF	GA	GD	Pts	Promotion or relegation
1	Savit Mogilev (P)	26	16	5	5	50	21	+29	53	Promotion to Belarusian Premier League
2	Granit Mikashevichi (P)	26	16	4	6	39	22	+17	52 (Note: Granit Mikashevichi placed above Lokomotiv Minsk by better head-to-head record (1–1, 2–0).)	Promotion to Belarusian Premier League
3	Lokomotiv Minsk (P)	26	16	4	6	49	21	+28	52	Promotion to Belarusian Premier League
4	Belshina Bobruisk	26	15	7	4	46	26	+20	49 (Note: Belshina Bobruisk had three points deducted before the start of the season due to transfer payment irregularities.)	
5	Khimik Svetlogorsk	26	12	8	6	46	31	+15	44	
6	Veras Nesvizh	26	12	4	10	28	25	+3	40	
7	Volna Pinsk	26	11	6	9	34	38	−4	39	
8	Dinamo-Belcard Grodno	26	11	3	12	33	37	−4	36	
9	Baranovichi	26	10	5	11	23	28	−5	35	
10	Vedrich-97 Rechitsa	26	9	6	11	29	26	+3	33	
11	Polotsk	26	6	5	15	26	49	−23	23	
12	Kommunalnik Slonim	26	5	5	16	22	48	−26	20	
13	Mozyr	26	4	6	16	26	44	−18	18	
14	Zvezda-BGU Minsk (R)	26	2	4	20	17	58	−41	10	Relegation to Belarusian Second League

Source: rsssf.com
Rules for classification: 1st points; 2nd matches won; 3rd head-to-head (points, matches won, goal difference, goals scored); 4th goal difference; 5th goals scored
(P) Promoted; (R) Relegated

== Top goalscorers ==
Rank	Goalscorer	Team	Goals
1	(Belarus) Uladzimir Shakaw	Savit Mogilev	17
2	(Belarus) Dmitry Gavrilovich	Khimik Svetlogorsk	13
2	(Belarus) Sergey Zabolotsky	Khimik Svetlogorsk	13
4	(Belarus) Yuri Markhel	Lokomotiv Minsk	12
4	(Belarus) Mikalay Yanush	Granit Mikashevichi	12

== See also ==
- 2007 Belarusian Premier League
- 2006–07 Belarusian Cup
- 2007–08 Belarusian Cup
