= Sergey Mitin =

Sergey Mitin may refer to:

- Sergey Anatolyevich Mitin (b. 1980), Russian footballer
- Sergey Gerasimovich Mitin (b. 1951), Russian politician, governor of Novgorod Oblast
