= Goran Jovanović =

Goran Jovanović may refer to:

- Goran Jovanović (footballer, born 1972), Serbian footballer who played in Russia, Hungary and Iceland
- Goran Jovanović (footballer, born 1977), Serbian footballer who played in Belarus and Montenegro
