= Ratko Nikolić (footballer) =

Serbian footballer

Personal information
- Date of birth: 11 July 1977 (age 49)
- Place of birth: Belgrade, SFR Yugoslavia
- Height: 1.78 m (5 ft 10 in)
- Position: Midfielder

Youth career
- 1987–1996: OFK Beograd

Senior career*
Years	Team	Apps	(Gls)
1995–1996	BSK Batajnica	10	(0)
1996–1997	Radnički Obrenovac	12	(1)
1997–1998	Zvezdara	20	(1)
1998–1999	Milicionar	9	(0)
1999–2000	Zvezdara	26	(4)
2000	Spartak-Chukotka Moscow	17	(0)
2001	Anzhi Makhachkala	17	(0)
2004–2005	Radnički Beograd	17	(0)
- * Club domestic league appearances and goals

Ratko Nikolić (Serbian Cyrillic: Ратко Николић; born 11 July 1977) is a Serbian retired footballer.
