= 2006 Belarusian First League =

Belarusian First League
- Season: 2006
- Champions: Minsk
- Promoted: Minsk; Smorgon
- Relegated: Lida; Bereza
- Matches: 182
- Goals: 509 (2.8 per match)

2006 Belarusian First League was the 16th season of 2nd level football championship in Belarus. It started in April and ended in October 2006.

== Team changes from 2005 season ==
Two best teams of the last season (Belshina Bobruisk and Lokomotiv Vitebsk) were promoted to Belarusian Premier League. They were replaced by two teams that finished at the bottom of 2005 Belarusian Premier League table (Zvezda-BGU Minsk and Slavia Mozyr).

Two lowest placed teams of 2005 season (Orsha and Dnepr-DUSSh-1 Rogachev) relegated to the Second League. They were replaced by two best teams of 2005 Second League (Torpedo-SKA Minsk and Pinsk-900).

Before the start of the season Smena Minsk was transformed into new club FC Minsk, which overtook Smena's First League allocation, bypassing the Second League. Newly promoted Torpedo-SKA Minsk was disbanded with some of its facilities being inherited by Minsk.

Slavia Mozyr and ZLiN Gomel merged into Mozyr-ZLiN, a club became a successor of Slavia Mozyr (and was eventually renamed into such).

Torpedo-Kadino Mogilev withdrew from the league and disbanded due to lack of financing. They were replaced by additionally promoted Polotsk, who finished 5th in last year's Second League. Two teams that finished above Polotsk and were also eligible for additional promotion (Spartak Shklov and Vertikal Kalinkovichi) refused the invitation due to insufficient financing. No other teams were promoted and the league was reduced from 16 to 14 clubs.

Granit Mikashevichi changed their name to FC Mikashevichi and Pinsk-900 to Volna Pinsk prior to the season.

== Teams and locations ==
Location of teams in 2006 Belarusian First League

Team	Location	Position in 2005
Zvezda-BGU	Minsk	Premier League, 13
Mozyr-ZLiN	Mozyr	Premier League, 14
Smorgon	Smorgon	3
Minsk	Minsk	5
Mikashevichi	Mikashevichi	6
Khimik	Svetlogorsk	7
Vedrich-97	Rechitsa	8
Baranovichi	Baranovichi	9
Lida	Lida	10
Veras	Nesvizh	11
Kommunalnik	Slonim	13
Bereza	Bereza	14
Volna	Pinsk	Second League, 2
Polotsk	Polotsk	Second League, 5

== League table ==
Pos	Team	Pld	W	D	L	GF	GA	GD	Pts	Promotion or relegation
1	Minsk (P)	26	17	5	4	44	13	+31	56	Promotion to Belarusian Premier League
2	Smorgon (P)	26	16	7	3	57	27	+30	55	Promotion to Belarusian Premier League
3	Khimik Svetlogorsk	26	14	7	5	48	30	+18	49	
4	Mozyr-ZLiN	26	11	10	5	44	24	+20	43	
5	Mikashevichi	26	12	4	10	38	33	+5	40	
6	Polotsk	26	11	4	11	36	41	−5	37	
7	Vedrich-97 Rechitsa	26	10	6	10	31	32	−1	36	
8	Volna Pinsk	26	10	4	12	47	48	−1	34	
9	Veras Nesvizh	26	9	5	12	27	33	−6	32	
10	Baranovichi	26	8	8	10	27	42	−15	32	
11	Kommunalnik Slonim	26	7	5	14	32	44	−12	26	
12	Zvezda-BGU Minsk	26	5	10	11	32	39	−7	25	
13	Lida (R)	26	6	5	15	23	45	−22	23	Relegation to Belarusian Second League
14	Bereza (R)	26	3	6	17	23	58	−35	15	Relegation to Belarusian Second League

Source: rsssf.com
Rules for classification: 1st points; 2nd matches won; 3rd head-to-head (points, matches won, goal difference, goals scored); 4th goal difference; 5th goals scored
(P) Promoted; (R) Relegated

== Top goalscorers ==
Rank	Goalscorer	Team	Goals
1	(Belarus) Dzmitry Vyarstak	Smorgon	19
2	(Belarus) Yury Aleshchanka	Polotsk	18
3	(Belarus) Andrey Sherakow	Mikashevichi	15
4	(Belarus) Dmitry Gavrilovich	Khimik Svetlogorsk	14
4	(Belarus) Dzmitry Asipenka	Smorgon	14

== See also ==
- 2006 Belarusian Premier League
- 2005–06 Belarusian Cup
- 2006–07 Belarusian Cup
