= Magomed Magomedov =

Magomed Magomedov may also refer to:

- Magomed Magomedov (fighter) (born 1991), Russian mixed martial artist
- Magomed Gadjievich Magomedov (1957–2013), Russian judge
- Magomed Magomedov (kickboxer) (born 1982), Russian kickboxer
- Magomed Magomedov (footballer, born 1987), Russian football player
- Magomed Magomedov (footballer, born 1997), Russian football player
- Magomed Magomedov (judoka born 1991), Russian judoka
