= 2007 Belarusian Premier League =

Belarusian Premier League
- Season: 2007
- Champions: BATE Borisov; 4th title
- Relegated: Minsk
- Champions League: BATE Borisov
- UEFA Cup: Gomel; MTZ-RIPO Minsk
- Intertoto Cup: Shakhtyor Soligorsk
- Matches: 182
- Goals: 407 (2.24 per match)
- Top goalscorer: (Belarus) Raman Vasilyuk (24)
- Biggest home win: Gomel 4–0 Dnepr; Dinamo Brest 4–0 Smorgon; Gomel 4–0 Darida
- Biggest away win: Darida 2–7 Gomel
- Highest scoring: Darida 2–7 Gomel

The 2007 Belarusian Premier League was the 17th season of top-tier football in Belarus. It started on April 14 and ended on November 10, 2007. BATE Borisov were the defending champions.

== Team changes from 2006 season ==
Lokomotiv Minsk and Belshina Bobruisk were the two teams relegated after the 2006 season, having finished in 13th and 14th place respectively. They were replaced by 2005 First League champions Minsk and runners-up Smorgon. Lokomotiv Vitebsk changed their name to Vitebsk.

== Overview ==
BATE Borisov won their 4th champions title and qualified for the next season's Champions League. The championship runners-up Gomel and 2007–08 Cup winners MTZ-RIPO Minsk qualified for UEFA Cup. Due to Premiere League expansion to 16 teams starting with next season, only one team (Minsk, who finished in the last place) relegated to the First League.

== Teams and venues ==
Location of teams in 2007 Belarusian Premier League

Team	Location	Venue	Capacity	Position in 2006
BATE	Borisov	City Stadium	5,392	1
Dinamo Minsk	Minsk	Dinamo Stadium	40,000	2
Shakhtyor	Soligorsk	Stroitel Stadium	4,200	3
MTZ-RIPO	Minsk	Traktor Stadium	17,600	4
Gomel	Gomel	Central Stadium	14,307	5
Vitebsk	Vitebsk	Vitebsky CSK	8,350	6
Naftan	Novopolotsk	Atlant Stadium	5,300	7
Darida	Minsk Raion	Darida Stadium	4,500	8
Dinamo Brest	Brest	OSK Brestskiy	10,080	9
Neman	Grodno	Neman Stadium	6,300	10
Torpedo	Zhodino	Torpedo Stadium (Zhodino)	3,020	11
Dnepr	Mogilev	Spartak Stadium	7,990	12
Minsk	Minsk	Torpedo Stadium (Minsk)	5,200	First league, 1
Smorgon	Smorgon	Yunost Stadium	3,000	First league, 2

== League table ==
Pos	Team	Pld	W	D	L	GF	GA	GD	Pts	Qualification or relegation
1	BATE Borisov (C)	26	18	2	6	50	25	+25	56	Qualification for Champions League first qualifying round
2	Gomel	26	12	8	6	49	28	+21	44	Qualification for UEFA Cup first qualifying round
3	Shakhtyor Soligorsk	26	12	8	6	41	27	+14	44	Qualification for Intertoto Cup first round
4	Torpedo Zhodino	26	11	10	5	28	21	+7	43	
5	MTZ-RIPO Minsk	26	11	9	6	32	25	+7	42	Qualification for UEFA Cup first qualifying round (Note: MTZ-RIPO Minsk qualified for the UEFA Cup first qualifying round by winning the 2007–08 Belarusian Cup.)
6	Neman Grodno	26	9	9	8	23	22	+1	36	
7	Naftan Novopolotsk	26	9	9	8	28	30	−2	36	
8	Vitebsk	26	9	8	9	25	28	−3	35	
9	Dinamo Minsk	26	8	11	7	27	28	−1	35	
10	Smorgon	26	6	8	12	15	29	−14	26	
11	Darida Minsk Raion	26	7	4	15	27	46	−19	25	
12	Dinamo Brest	26	6	7	13	23	31	−8	25	
13	Dnepr Mogilev	26	5	8	13	21	33	−12	23	
14	Minsk (R)	26	4	9	13	18	34	−16	21	Relegation to Belarusian First League

Source: rsssf.com
Rules for classification: 1st points; 2nd matches won; 3rd head-to-head
(C) Champions; (R) Relegated

== Results ==
Home \ Away	BAT	DAR	DBR	DMI	DNE	GOM	MIN	MTZ	NAF	NEM	SHA	SMR	TZH	VIT
BATE Borisov		4–1	2–1	3–0 (Note: Awarded as a 3–0 win for BATE due to Dinamo having a suspended player on the bench. Originally ended with a 2–1 win for BATE.)	2–0	2–0	1–2	0–3	4–2	2–1	1–0	4–2	3–0	4–1
Darida Minsk Raion	1–0		1–2	1–0	2–1	2–7	0–0	1–1	0–2	0–1	0–3	1–0	1–2	2–3
Dinamo Brest	2–1	2–1		2–2	1–1	0–2	0–0	0–1	0–0	0–0	0–1	4–0	1–0	0–1
Dinamo Minsk	0–3	2–1	0–2		1–0	1–0	1–0	0–1	3–0	0–0	1–0	2–0	0–0	0–0
Dnepr Mogilev	1–2	0–1	3–1	1–1		2–0	0–0	2–1	0–0	1–3	2–3	0–0	1–1	1–2
Gomel	1–3	4–0	4–1	4–4	4–0		1–0	2–2	3–1	2–0	1–1	1–0	1–1	2–1
Minsk	0–1	0–2	0–0	2–2	0–0	2–6		1–2	1–2	2–1	0–0	1–0	0–0	2–1
MTZ-RIPO Minsk	0–0	1–0	2–1	1–0	2–3	1–1	2–1		1–0	1–1	1–3	2–2	2–0	0–1
Naftan Novopolotsk	2–2	1–1	0–0	1–0	1–0	1–0	3–0	2–2		1–0	0–2	0–1	1–1	0–0
Neman Grodno	1–0	0–3	1–0	1–1	0–0	0–1	3–1	2–1	3–2		2–0	0–1	0–1	2–1
Shakhtyor Soligorsk	3–4	3–1	3–2	2–2	2–0	0–0	1–1	1–1	3–1	1–1		3–0	0–2	1–2
Smorgon	1–0	1–1	1–0	0–1	1–0	1–1	2–1	0–1	1–1	0–0	0–2		0–0	1–1
Torpedo Zhodino	0–1	4–2	1–0	2–2	2–0	2–1	2–1	1–0	1–2	0–0	1–1	1–0		2–0
Vitebsk	0–1	2–1	3–1	1–1	0–2	0–0	1–0	0–0	1–2	0–0	1–2	1–0	1–1	

Source: football.by (in Belarusian)
Legend: Blue = home team win; Yellow = draw; Red = away team win.

== Belarusian clubs in European Cups ==
Round	Team #1	Agg.	Team #2	1st leg	2nd leg
2007 UEFA Intertoto Cup
First round	Shakhtyor Soligorsk (Belarus)	4–3	(Armenia) Ararat Yerevan	4–1	0–2
Second round	Chernomorets Odessa (Ukraine)	6–2	(Belarus) Shakhtyor Soligorsk	4–2	2–0
2007–08 UEFA Cup
First qualifying round	Liepājas Metalurgs (Latvia)	3–2	(Belarus) Dinamo Brest	1–1	2–1
First qualifying round	Skonto Riga (Latvia)	1–3	(Belarus) Dinamo Minsk	1–1	0–2
Second qualifying round	Dinamo Minsk (Belarus)	1–5	(Denmark) Odense	1–1	0–4
First round	Villarreal (Spain)	6–1	(Belarus) BATE Borisov	4–1	2–0
2007–08 UEFA Champions League
First qualifying round	APOEL Nicosia (Cyprus)	2–3	(Belarus) BATE Borisov	2–0	0–3 (aet)
Second qualifying round	Hafnarfjarðar (Iceland)	2–4	(Belarus) BATE Borisov	1–3	1–1
Thind qualifying round	BATE Borisov (Belarus)	2–4	(Romania) Steaua București	2–2	0–2

== Top scorers ==
Rank	Name	Team	Goals
1	(Belarus) Raman Vasilyuk	Gomel	24
2	(Belarus) Gennadi Bliznyuk	BATE Borisov	18
3	(Belarus) Vitali Rodionov	BATE Borisov	14
3	(Belarus) Valery Strypeykis	Gomel	14
5	(Belarus) Andrey Sherakow	Torpedo Zhodino	10
6	(Russia) Aleksandr Alumona	Neman Grodno	9
6	(Belarus) Syarhey Nikiforenka	Shakhtyor Soligorsk	9
6	(Belarus) Viktor Sokol	Dinamo Brest	9
9	(Belarus) Alyaksandr Klimenka	Shakhtyor Soligorsk	8
9	(Belarus) Ruslan Usaw	Vitebsk	8

== See also ==
- 2007 Belarusian First League
- 2006–07 Belarusian Cup
- 2007–08 Belarusian Cup
