= Andriy Volkov =

- Волков Андрій Вікторович
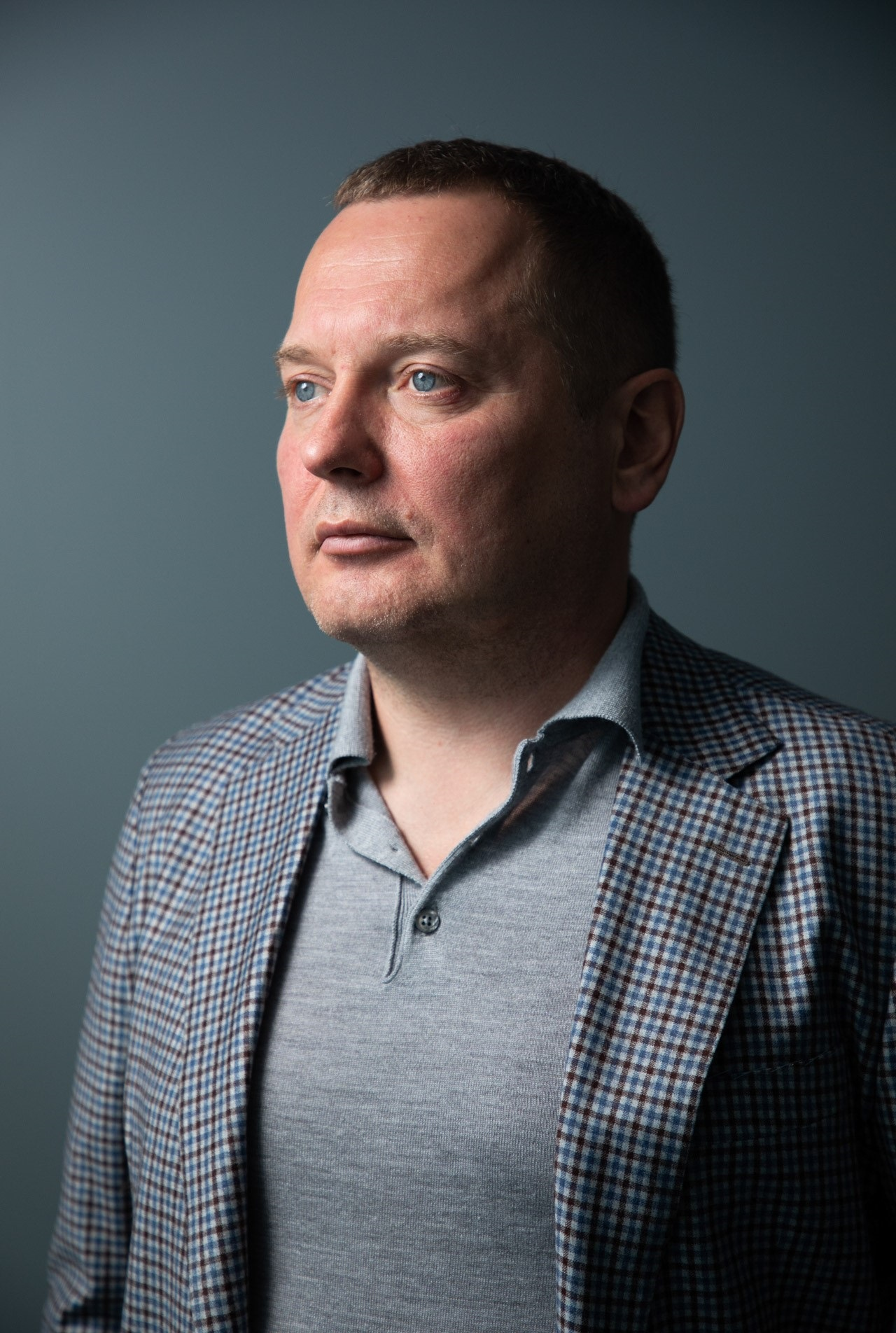
- Born: 1976; Odesa
- Citizenship: Ukraine

Andriy Volkov (Ukrainian: Андрій Вікторович Волков; born in 1976, Odesa, Ukraine) is a Ukrainian financier, the founder and partner of the Investohills group of companies, co-founder of the international fund Investohills Helianthus, former member of the Board of Alfa-Bank.

== Biography ==
Andriy Volkov was born in 1976 in Odesa. In 1998, he obtained a master's degree in international economics from the Odesa National Economics University. During his student years, he headed AIESEC's local committee in Odesa.

== Career ==
In 1997, he became a consultant in banking management at the auditing and consulting company PricewaterhouseCoopers.

Since 2000, he has been a deputy project manager at ING IGA (a division of the Dutch ING bank group).

In 2001, he headed the risk management department at Alfa-Bank Ukraine, and in February 2003 he became a member of the bank's Management Board.

In October 2003, Andriy Volkov became the Deputy Chairman of the Board of Alfa-Bank Ukraine.

From 2006 to 2009, he was the chairman of the board of Alfa-Bank Ukraine, and at the same time he was the chairman of the supervisory board of the Alfa-Insurance company.

In 2009, Andriy Volkov left "Alfa-Bank Ukraine" and became one of the founders of the Investohills investment group.

In 2014, EMF New Europe Insurance Fund, an international investment fund specializing in investments in the insurance business, became an investor in Investohills. The deal was closed in the summer of 2014 and, according to Forbes Ukraine, it became the best deal involving foreign investors in the financial sector.

In April 2014, the Cabinet of Ministers of Ukraine appointed Andriy Volkov as the head of the National Securities and Stock Market Commission (Ukraine). However, due to a conflict with the then acting acting he did not start work as the head of the National Financial Service Commission and resigned from his post. A few months later, his appointment was revoked.

=== Investohills ===
Since 2009, Volkov has been a managing partner of the Investohills financial group of companies, which specializes in operations with distressed assets.

In 2011, the group bought a portfolio of troubled mortgages from Ukrsibbank for a total of $650 million. This was a record amount of investments in the mortgage portfolio in Ukraine. The portfolio consisted of more than 12,000 problem mortgages and car loans, in respect of which about 6,000 court cases were conducted.

In general, in 2011-2013, Volkov bought out troubled loans of Swedbank Ukraine, Credit Agricole, Bank of Georgia, etc.

Between 2019 and 2020, the Investohills purchased over 50% of all distressed loans sold by the Ukraine's government. The company formed a debt portfolio worth 100 billion hryvnias.

In 2021, Investohills was recognized as the largest financial player in the problem debt market in the nomination "TOP 100 largest leaders of the financial market".

=== Investohills Helianthus ===
In 2020, the Investohills group of companies and Andriy Volkov created the international fund Investohills Helianthus, which specializes in investments in distressed assets. One of the goals was to invest EU and US funds in the Ukrainian problem debt market.

In May 2020, the National Commission for Securities and the Stock Market approved the first stage of the issue of shares of the fund for 1 billion hryvnias.

== Charitable activity ==
After Russia's full-scale invasion of Ukraine, Andriy Volkov focused on helping IDPs and the Defense Forces of Ukraine. In particular, he turned the office building of his company Investohills in Zaporizhzhia into a center for helping forcibly displaced persons, adapted a hotel owned by his company in Kyiv for the Armed Forces of Ukraine, and helped relocate the Ukrainian manufacturer of TEMP-3000 body armor to the west of Ukraine.
