= National Securities and Stock Market Commission (Ukraine) =

National Securities and Stock Market Commission Національна комісія з цінних паперів та фондового ринку

Agency overview
- Formed: June 12, 1995
- Preceding agency: The State Commission on Securities and Stock Market
- Jurisdiction: President of Ukraine
- Headquarters: Ukraine, 8/30, Knyaziv Ostrozki st, Kyiv; 50°26′25″N 30°32′40″E
- Employees: 375 (as of 2022)
- Annual budget: ▲UAH ₴ 135.67 million (2019) ▲UAH ₴ 198.15 million (2022)
- Agency executive: Ruslan Magomedov Head of Commission
- Parent agency: Cabinet of Ministers; Constitution of Ukraine
- Website: nssmc.gov.ua

The National Securities and Stock Market Commission of Ukraine (Ukrainian: Національна комісія з цінних паперів та фондового ринку України, romanized: Natsionalna komisiia z tsinnykh paperiv ta fondovoho rynku Ukrainy) or NSSMC (Ukrainian: НКЦПФР, romanized: NKTsPFR) is a public institution, which carries out the supervision of participants of Ukrainian capital markets, ensures enhancing stability, competitiveness and development of the capital markets as well as protection of the interests of investors, prevention of abuse and offenses.

The NSSMC is under the jurisdiction of the President of Ukraine while being accountable to the Parliament of Ukraine. It was formerly known as the State Commission on Securities and Stock Market (Ukrainian: Державна комісія з цінних паперів та фондового ринку, romanized: Derzhavna komisiia z tsinnykh paperiv ta fondovoho rynku).

== About public institution ==
The national securities and stock market commission is a state collegiate body subordinated to the President of Ukraine and accountable to the Verkhovna Rada of Ukraine.

The system of the body includes: the central body and four territorial bodies.

The main form of work of the commission is meetings, which are regularly held at the decision of the chairman of the commission (twice a week).

The purpose of the NSSMC is to create, through its regulatory and supervisory functions, the conditions for the proper and efficient functioning of the securities market, to provide cash capital to the needs of the country's economy by creating a mechanism for the accumulation, distribution and redistribution of funds from a person who has free investment resources to a person, which needs such resources for development, creation of conditions for formation of powerful domestic investors and protection of rights of investors.

The mission of the NSSMC is to ensure the implementation of a single state policy on securities and the functioning of the stock market in Ukraine, as well as to implement legal regulation of relations arising on the market, protection of interests of citizens of Ukraine and the state, prevention of abuse and offenses, coordination activities of ministries and other central bodies of state executive power in this sphere.

== History ==
The commission was formed June 12, 1995, with the aim of a comprehensive legal regulation of relations arising in the securities market, to protect the country's and citizens' interest rights, and prevent abuse and violation in this area in accordance with paragraph 7-4 of Article 114-5 of the Constitution of the Ukrainian SSR. President of Ukraine (L. Kuchma) Decree of June 12, 1995 No.446/95. Commission created a central executive body, its territorial authorities approved the Regulation on the Commission and appointed the first office executive – Mozhovyi Oleh.

The new regulation on the Commission appeared two years later, on February 14, 1997. According to it, the implementation of the new Law of Ukraine "On State Regulation of Securities Market in Ukraine" the SEC was declared a state body, subordinate and accountable to the president of Ukraine and Verkhovna Rada of Ukraine.

From October 7, 2010, to July 7, 2011, continuing the range of political reforms, the SEC was subject to President of Ukraine review request executed by Verkhovna Rada of Ukraine and Cabinet of Ministers of Ukraine

On July 7, 2011, the authority changed its name to its current form. On November 23, 2011, the existing provisions came into effect.

== Chair persons ==
The NSSMC is composed of the chairman of the commission and six members of the commission, who are appointed and dismissed in accordance with the decrees of the President of Ukraine.

=== Chairmans ===
- 1995 Mozhovyi Oleh;
- 2004 Balyuk Anatoly Ivanovich
- 2010 Tevelev Dmytro;
- 2014 Andriy Volkov;
- 2015 Tymur Khromaiev;
- 2021 Ruslan Magomedov.

=== Members of the commission ===
- Maksym Libanov;
- Iraklii Baramiia;
- Yurii Boiko;
- Yurii Shapoval;
- Yaroslav Shliakhov;
- Arsen Ilin.

== Committees ==
The following Committees work in the Commission on a permanent basis with the involvement of representatives of society organizations:

- Issuers Functioning and Corporate Governance Committee (head - Commission Member M.O. Libanov);
- Committee on Issuers' Functioning and Corporate Governance (Head - Commission Member Libanov M.);
- Development and Implementation of Derivative Contracts Committee (head - Member of the Commission Shliakhov Y.);
- Functioning of Joint Investment Institutions and Accumulative Pensions Committee (Head - Commission Member Boyko Y.);
- Functioning of the Trading Infrastructure of the Capital Markets Committee (Head - Member of the Commission Shlyakhov Y.);
- Functioning of Post-Trading Infrastructure of Capital Markets Committee (head - Commission Member Baramiia I.);
- Functioning of Organized Commodity Markets Committee (head - Commission Member Ilin A.);
- Financial and Credit Mechanisms of Construction and Mortgage Committee (head - Commission Member Ilin A.);
- Supervision and Control over the Functioning of Capital Markets and Organized Commodity Markets Committee(Head – Commission Member Baramiia I.);
- Law Enforcement Committee (head - Member of the Commission Shapoval Y.);
- Information Technologies and Information Security Committee (head - Member of the Commission Boyko Y.);
- Financial Monitoring and Control of Financial Statements Committee (Head - Commission Member Shapoval Y.).

== Areas of Activity ==
Key areas of activity of the National Commission on Securities and Stock Market include:

- Regulatory activities;
- Licensing of professional activities;
- Registration of securities issuance;
- Supervision of issuers and professional participants;
- Inspections of professional participants;
- Corporate governance;
- Financial monitoring;
- Law enforcement in the securities market;
- Certification of specialists.

=== Regulatory activities ===
On February 24, 2022, from 11:00 AM, with the aim of countering panic actions that could collapse the markets and deprive them of the possibility of their full-fledged operation in the future, preserve data and property rights, the Commission imposed restrictions on transactions in the capital markets and organized commodity markets. This also allowed for the identification of assets associated with the aggressor country (Russia) and the Republic of Belarus, and limited the abilities of companies associated with these countries to conduct business in Ukraine.

=== Licensing of professional activities ===
The NCSSM issues licenses for the following types of professional activities in the capital markets:

1) Activities in trading financial instruments, which include:

- Sub-brokerage activities;
- Brokerage activities;
- Dealership activities;
- Managing a portfolio of financial instruments;
- Investment advice;
- Underwriting and/or placement activities with a guarantee;
- Placement activities without a guarantee.

2) Activities in the organization of trading in financial instruments, which include:

- Activities in the organization of trading securities on the regulated stock market;
- Activities in the organization of derivative contract execution on the regulated derivatives market;
- Activities in the organization of trading money market instruments on the regulated money market;
- Activities in the organization of trading securities on the stock multilateral trading facility (MTF);
- Activities in the organization of derivative contract execution on the MTF for derivatives;
- Activities in the organization of trading bonds on the organized trading facility (further referred to as OTF) for bonds;

3) Clearing activities, which include:

- Clearing activities for determining obligations;
- Clearing activities of a central counterparty;

4) Depository activities, which include:

- Depository activities of a depository institution;
- Activities related to the custody of assets of collective investment institutions;
- Activities related to the custody of pension fund assets;

5) Asset management activities of institutional investors, which include:

- Asset management activities;
- Management of mortgage coverage;

6) Activities in property management for financing construction projects and/or carrying out real estate transactions;

7) Activities in administering private pension funds.

=== Registration of security issuance ===
Since 2022, during the period of martial law (as of 01.08.22), the NCSSM, in order to attract funds to the budget and support the economy, has allowed 20 issues of government bonds to enter the markets.

=== Supervision of issuers and professional participants ===
In November 2023, the NCSSM, by decision No. 1232, prohibited the circulation of shares of 91 joint-stock companies that did not disclose regular annual information for two or more consecutive years, as these companies are in a situation where further circulation of their securities would violate the rights of investors.

=== Inspection of professional participants ===
To fulfill the tasks assigned to the Commission by the Law of Ukraine "On State Regulation of Capital Markets and Organized Commodity Markets," field inspections (audits) are conducted. According to the generally accepted principles of IOSCO, the regulator must have the authority to inspect, investigate, and supervise, collect evidence of possible violations in the actions of capital market participants, and take measures to prevent violations of legislation. These inspections are carried out with the purpose of:

- Determining the purpose and essence of the operations carried out by licensees, the Central Securities Depository;
- Identifying risks that may pose a threat to the safety and stability of the activities of licensees, the Central Securities Depository, as well as the stability of Ukraine's financial system;
- Assessing the quality of the risk management system of licensees, the Central Securities Depository;
- Checking the compliance of licensees, the Central Securities Depository with the rights of clients (depositors, consumers of financial services, investors, participants);
- Checking the compliance of the subjects of inspection (except SROs and the Central Securities Depository) with the legislation in case of license annulment;
- Checking the compliance of self-regulatory organizations with their functions;
- Assessing the compliance of the subject of inspection with legislative requirements in the securities market, in the system of accumulative pension provision, legislation on the protection of the rights of consumers of financial services, including the regulatory legal acts of the NSSMC.

The basis for the Control Authority to conduct a scheduled inspection of an issuer is its inclusion in the inspection schedule plan for the relevant quarter (published on the Commission's webpage). Scheduled inspections are conducted no more than once per calendar year, and the issuer must be preliminarily notified in writing by the Commission via registered mail or electronic communication, to the address specified in the annual report, no later than ten calendar days before the start of the inspection. Additionally, this is done by placing the inspection schedule plan on the official website of the NSSMC.

Additionally, the Commission may conduct unscheduled inspections in the presence of such grounds:

- Written notification of signs of violation of the securities and/or joint-stock companies legislation;
- Submission by the issuer to the NSSMC of an application for cancellation of the registration of a securities issue;
- Initiative of the NSSMC in case of detection of signs of violation by the issuer of the requirements of the legislation on securities and/or joint-stock companies;
- Discovery by the NSSMC of new documents (circumstances) that were not (could not be) known during the conduct of scheduled or unscheduled inspections and which may affect the conclusions of the inspection;
- Issuance of a decision by an authorized person of the NSSMC to suspend proceedings in a case of violation in the securities market for the purpose of conducting an additional inspection;
- To execute court decisions, at the request of law enforcement and other state authorities within the powers defined by legislation;
- The need to check the implementation of decisions of the NSSMC or orders, decisions, or resolutions of authorized persons of the NSSMC regarding the elimination of violations of securities legislation;
- Failure by the subject of inspection to submit documents (information) within the prescribed period to the written request of the NSSMC regarding the conduct of a non-departure inspection, as well as written explanations of the reasons that prevent the submission of such documents;
- Detection of false data in documents (information) provided by the subject of inspection to the written request of the NSSMC, including the request for conducting a non-departure inspection, and/or if such documents (information) do not allow assessing the compliance of the subject of inspection with the requirements of the securities legislation;
- Absence of reliable data on the actual location, including the return of correspondence.

== See also ==
- Ministry of Finance (Ukraine);
- National Bank of Ukraine;
- State Audit Service of Ukraine.
