= Sergei Rekhtin =

Russian footballer and coach

Personal information
- Full name: Sergei Valentinovich Rekhtin
- Date of birth: 12 September 1974 (age 52)
- Place of birth: Barnaul, Russian SFSR
- Height: 1.88 m (6 ft 2 in)
- Position: Defender

Youth career
- FC Dynamo Barnaul

Senior career*
Years	Team	Apps	(Gls)
1993–1994	FC Politekhnik-92 Barnaul	42	(0)
1995–2000	FC Dynamo Barnaul	146	(4)
2000–2006	FC Tom Tomsk	135	(4)
2007–2008	FC Dynamo Barnaul	36	(7)
2010	SDYuShOR Dynamo Barnaul		

Managerial career
- 2010–2011: FC Dynamo Barnaul (assistant)
- * Club domestic league appearances and goals

Sergei Valentinovich Rekhtin (Russian: Сергей Валентинович Рехтин; born 12 September 1974 in Barnaul) is a Russian football coach and a former player.
