= Akhmed Kurbanov =

Russian footballer

Personal information
- Full name: Akhmed Kairovich Kurbanov
- Date of birth: 22 April 1986 (age 40)
- Place of birth: Makhachkala, Russian SFSR
- Height: 1.75 m (5 ft 9 in)
- Positions: Forward; midfielder

Senior career*
Years	Team	Apps	(Gls)
2001–2004	FC Anzhi Makhachkala	22	(1)
2005	FC Tekstilshchik Kamyshin	4	(0)
2006	FC Dagdizel Kaspiysk	7	(0)
2008	FC Arsenal Tula (amateur)		
2008–2012	FC Dagdizel Kaspiysk	87	(3)
2012	FC Mashuk-KMV Pyatigorsk	17	(0)
- * Club domestic league appearances and goals

Akhmed Kairovich Kurbanov (Russian: Ахмед Каирович Курбанов; born 22 April 1986) is a former Russian professional football player.

== Club career ==
He made his Russian Football National League debut for FC Anzhi Makhachkala on 1 November 2003 in a game against PFC Spartak Nalchik. He also played for Anzhi in the FNL in the following season.
