= Ruslan Mahomedov (economist) =

Ukrainian politician and economist

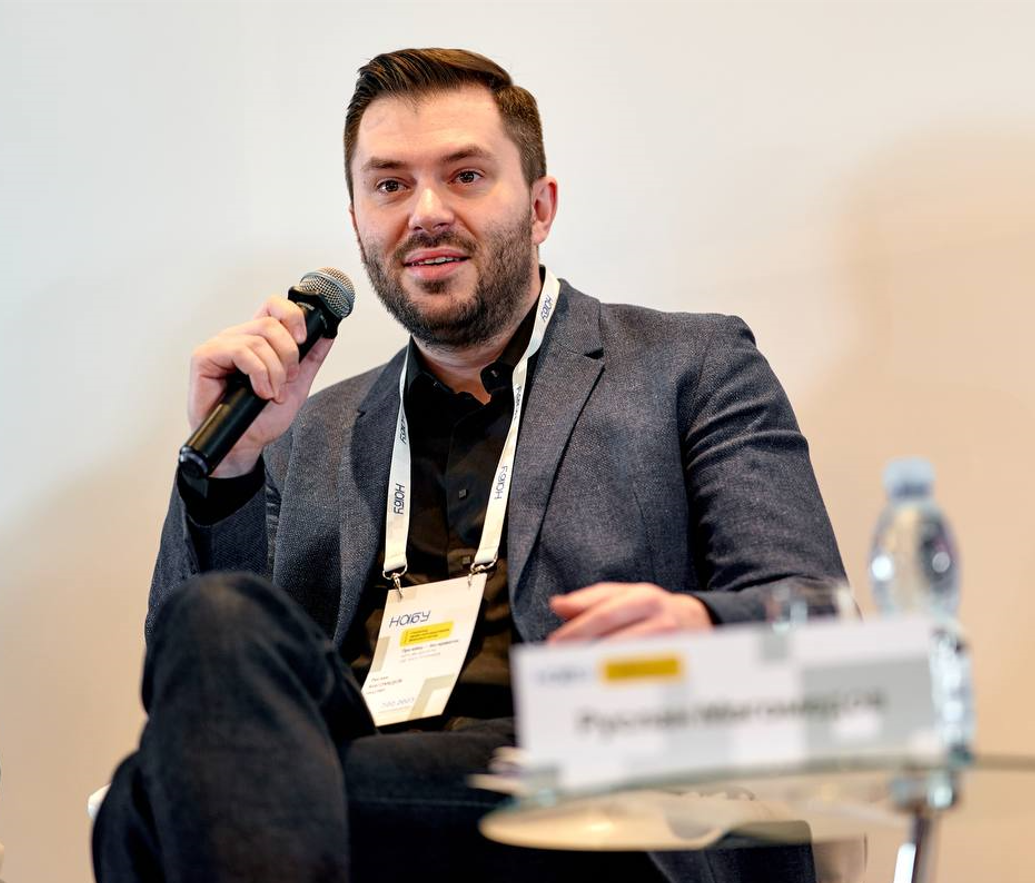
- Mahomedov in 2023
- Born: 5 May 1984 (age 42); Kyiv, Ukraine
- Education: Kyiv National Economic University named after Vadym Hetman
- Known for: Chairman of the National Commission on Securities and Stock Market
- Term: Since 23 February 2021
- Predecessor: Timur Zaurbekovich Khromaev

Ruslan Sadrudynovych Mahomedov (Ukrainian: Руслан Садрудинович Магомедов; born 5 May 1984) is the Chairman of the National Commission on Securities and Stock Market since 23 February 2021.

== Education and career ==
Ruslan Sadrudynovych Mahomedov was born on 5 May 1984.

In 2005, he graduated with a master's degree in "Enterprise Finance" from the Kyiv National Economic University named after Vadym Hetman, after which he worked at the State Property Fund of Ukraine.

From 2005 to 2006, he was a senior trader at the company "Kyiv Securities Group". He was a member of the PFTS Stock Exchange Association.

In 2006, he became the head of the internet trading department of IC "Prospect Investments" (from January 2009 to February 2010).

From February 2010, he was the head of the online brokerage management of the Trading Operations Department at Astrum Capital (Astrum Investment Management). From February 2011 to May 2016, he was the director of LLC "ASTRUM CAPITAL".

In 2014, he became a member of the Trading Activity Committee of the Association "Ukrainian Stock Traders."

In 2016, he participated in the competition for the position of the chairman of the board of JSC "National Depository of Ukraine".

From October 2016, he was an advisor to the chairman of the board of JSC "Settlement Center for Servicing Financial Market Contracts".

From 2017 to 2019, he was a senior project manager in the project "Development and Consolidation of Capital Market Infrastructure" at the European Bank for Reconstruction and Development.

Since 2020, he has been an external advisor to the head of the Office of the President of Ukraine, Andriy Yermak.

On 3 June 2020, according to the order of the Cabinet of Ministers of Ukraine from 3 June 2020, No. 613, he was introduced as the representative of the President of Ukraine to the competition commission for determining candidates for the positions of independent members of the supervisory board of the state bank.

On 1 February 2021, he submitted a declaration as a candidate for the position of the head of the National Securities and Stock Market Commission. His candidacy among others was proposed to the Office of the President of Ukraine by the Council of the Professional Association of Capital and Derivatives Market Participants.

=== Chairman of the Commission ===
By the decree of the President of Ukraine dated 23 February 2021, No. 69/2021, he was appointed as the head of the National Commission on Securities and Stock Market (NSSMC).

From 2021 to 2023, he advocated various events for the draft law "On Amendments to the Law of Ukraine 'On State Regulation of Capital and Organized Commodity Markets' and Some Other Legislative Acts of Ukraine on the Regulation and Supervision of Capital Markets and Organized Commodity Markets" No. 5865 dated 26 August 2021.

In September 2021, together with other government representatives, Sergei Marchenko and Marina Lazebna, he participated in a roundtable on the topic: "Pension reform in Ukraine: to be or not to be".

In February 2022, at the plenary session of the Verkhovna Rada of Ukraine, he presented the Law of Ukraine "On Virtual Assets" (No. 3637) with proposals from the President of Ukraine, which was subsequently adopted in its entirety with their consideration.

Following the Russian invasion of Ukraine in 2022, as the Head of NSSMC, he appealed to foreign regulators and participants in the securities market to restrict Russians' access to such securities that are traded and accounted for on foreign platforms.

In August 2023, he participated in the UkrainianGasOpen 2023 forum: "Extraction. Transportation. Storage. Sale," dedicated to the development of the Ukrainian gas market in wartime conditions, its transit, storage, sale, cooperation of operators, and interconnectors.

Together with other government representatives, he participated in an offline forum of the Independent Association of Banks of Ukraine "About the war – without ties: what we have achieved and what we are preparing for," where he focused on the reform of NSSMC (provided by the draft law No. 5865 dated 26 August 2021), as well as other vital directions of NSSMC work such as: securitization, investment accounts, virtual assets, pension reform, development of the agro-sector, and the corresponding commodity market. In March 2024, the President of Ukraine signed the Law of Ukraine ‘On State Regulation of Capital Markets and Organised Commodity Markets and Certain Other Legislative Acts of Ukraine on Improving State Regulation and Supervision of Capital Markets and Organised Commodity Markets’ (No. 3585-IX), which was advocated by Ruslan Mahomedov and aimed to increase the institutional capacity and guarantee the independence of the NSSMC. The launch of the NSSMC reform with the adoption of this law was one of the conditions for the disbursement of a $1.5 billion DPL to Ukraine from the World Bank.
