= Eduard Anisakharov =

Russian footballer

Personal information
- Full name: Eduard Mikhailovich Anisakharov
- Date of birth: 4 July 1983 (age 43)
- Height: 1.83 m (6 ft 0 in)
- Position: Midfielder

Senior career*
Years	Team	Apps	(Gls)
2000–2009	FC Neftekhimik Nizhnekamsk	205	(18)
2009–2010	FC SOYUZ-Gazprom Izhevsk	27	(2)
2010–2012	FC Neftekhimik Nizhnekamsk	27	(2)
- * Club domestic league appearances and goals

Eduard Mikhailovich Anisakharov (Russian: Эдуард Михайлович Анисахаров; born 4 July 1983) is a former Russian professional football player.

== Club career ==
He played 4 seasons in the Russian Football National League for FC Neftekhimik Nizhnekamsk.

== Personal life ==
His twin brother Ruslan Anisakharov also played football professionally.
