= Mikhail Mikhaylov (footballer) =

Russian footballer

Personal information
- Full name: Mikhail Sergeyevich Mikhaylov
- Date of birth: 11 November 1981 (age 44)
- Height: 1.85 m (6 ft 1 in)
- Positions: Defender; midfielder

Senior career*
Years	Team	Apps	(Gls)
1997–1998	FC Iriston Vladikavkaz	64	(3)
1999–2000	FC Lokomotiv-2 Moscow	70	(4)
2001	FC Anzhi Makhachkala	0	(0)
2001	FC Lokomotiv Moscow	0	(0)
2002	FC Krasnoznamensk	8	(0)
2002–2004	FC Dynamo Makhachkala	75	(1)
2005	FC Avangard Kursk	8	(0)
2005	FC Mashuk-KMV Pyatigorsk	7	(0)
2006	FC Spartak-MZhK Ryazan	9	(0)
2007	FC Dynamo Voronezh	6	(0)
2007	FC Reutov	4	(0)
2008	FC Dynamo Stavropol	4	(0)
2008	FC Olimpia Volgograd	18	(0)
2009	FC Stavropolye-2009	25	(0)
2010	FC Avtodor Vladikavkaz	22	(1)
2011–2012	FC Sibiryak Bratsk	12	(0)
- * Club domestic league appearances and goals

Mikhail Sergeyevich Mikhaylov (Russian: Михаи́л Серге́евич Миха́йлов; born 11 November 1981) is a former Russian professional association football player.

== Club career ==
He made his Russian Football National League debut for FC Dynamo Makhachkala on 28 March 2004 in a game against FC Lisma-Mordovia Saransk. Next season, he also played in the FNL for FC Avangard Kursk.
