= Aleksandr Nikulin (footballer, born 1979) =

Russian footballer

Personal information
- Full name: Aleksandr Pavlovich Nikulin
- Date of birth: 14 February 1979 (age 47)
- Place of birth: Kuybyshev
- Height: 1.80 m (5 ft 11 in)
- Position: Midfielder

Youth career
- DYuSSh-11 Voskhod Samara

Senior career*
Years	Team	Apps	(Gls)
1996–1999	FC Krylia Sovetov Samara	10	(0)
1997	→ FC Neftyanik Pokhvistnevo (loan)	33	(14)
2000	FC Lada Togliatti	4	(0)
2001–2002	FC Zhemchuzhina Sochi	68	(16)
2003–2005	FC Anzhi Makhachkala	102	(12)
2006–2007	FC Ural Yekaterinburg	67	(3)
2008	FC Gazovik Orenburg	17	(4)
- * Club domestic league appearances and goals

Aleksandr Pavlovich Nikulin (Russian: Александр Павлович Никулин; born 14 February 1979) is a former Russian football player.
