= Zehrudin Kavazović =

Bosnian football manager (born 1975)

Personal information
- Date of birth: 16 February 1975 (age 51)
- Place of birth: Banovići, SFR Yugoslavia
- Height: 1.80 m (5 ft 11 in)
- Position: Midfielder

Senior career*
Years	Team	Apps	(Gls)
1996–1998	Sloboda Tuzla	41	(11)
1998–2000	VfL Osnabrück	13	(0)
2000–2001	Budućnost Banovići		
2001	Anzhi Makhachkala	3	(0)
2002–2003	Budućnost Banovići		
2003–2004	Čelik Zenica	12	(2)
2004–2006	Budućnost Banovići	49	(14)

International career
2001	Bosnia and Herzegovina	4	(1)

Managerial career
- 2023–2024: Budućnost Banovići
- 2024: Radnički Lukavac
- * Club domestic league appearances and goals

Zehrudin Kavazović (born 16 February 1975) is a Bosnian football manager and former player.

== Club career ==
Kavazović played for Anzhi Makhachkala in the Russian Premier League.

== International career ==
Kavazović made his debut for Bosnia and Herzegovina in a January 2001 Sahara Millenium Cup match against Serbia and Montenegro in India and made four appearances at the tournament, scoring one goal. The games were not considered full FIFA internationals.
