= Jupiter Yves Ngangue =

Cameroonian footballer

Jupiter Ngangue
Personal information
- Full name: Jupiter Yves Ngangue
- Date of birth: 14 May 1980 (age 46)
- Place of birth: Yaoundé, Cameroon
- Height: 1.82 m (5 ft 11 1/2 in)
- Position: Forward

Senior career*
Years	Team	Apps	(Gls)
1997–1999	Canon Yaoundé		
2000–2001	Dynamo Douala		
2001	FC Anzhi Makhachkala	5	(0)
2001–2003	US Lunel		
2003–2004	ES Beni-Khalled		
2005–2007	CS Hammam-Lif		
2011–2012	Ayeyawady United F.C.		
- * Club domestic league appearances and goals

Jupiter Yves Ngangue (in other sources - Yves Jupiter Ngangue; born 14 May 1980 in Yaoundé) is a former Cameroonian football player.

His short stay in Dagestan in 2001 was problematic, given that Ngangue was one of the very few non-Dagestanis in the insecure region at that time. He had to stay at the guest house of the government all the time.
