= Torpedo Stadium (Mogilev) =

Sports venue in Mogilev, Belarus

- Interactive map of Torpedo Stadium
- Location: Mogilev, Belarus
- Coordinates: 53.883248°N 30.414604°E
- Owner: City of Mogilev
- Capacity: 3,560
- Surface: Grass
- Field size: 105 x 68 meters

Construction
- Opened: 1960
- Renovated: 1978, 2005

Tenants
- Torpedo Mogilev (1960–2005, 2014–); Savit Mogilev (2006–2008)

Torpedo Stadium is a multi-purpose stadium in Mogilev, Belarus. It is mostly used for football matches and is a home stadium for Torpedo Mogilev. The stadium holds 3,560 spectators.

== History ==
The stadium was built and opened in 1960. Renovation works were performed in 1978 and 2005. At present, the stadium is a part of bigger Torpedo Sport Complex which includes facilities for other sports as well.

Between 2006 and 2008 the stadium was a home ground for Savit Mogilev.
