= Lazo Lipovski =

Association football z

Personal information
- Date of birth: 27 March 1966 (age 60)
- Place of birth: Struga, SFR Yugoslavia
- Height: 1.93 m (6 ft 4 in)
- Position: Goalkeeper

Youth career
- Krofma Strumica

Senior career*
Years	Team	Apps	(Gls)
1982–1983	Krofma Strumica		
1983–1985	Partizan	0	(0)
1986	Bor		
1986–1987	Pobeda		
1987–1989	OFK Kikinda		
1989–1990	Partizan	0	(0)
1990–1992	MIK Skopje		
1992–1995	Winterthur		
1995–1998	Sloga Jugoomagnat		
1998–2001	Anzhi Makhachkala	24	(0)

Managerial career
- 2000–2001: Anzhi Makhachkala (gk coach)
- * Club domestic league appearances and goals

Lazo Lipovski (Macedonian: Лазо Липоски, born 27 March 1966) is a Macedonian former professional footballer who played as a goalkeeper.

== Club career ==
Lipovski started playing with FK Krofma Strumica before being brought by Serbian giants FK Partizan in 1983. He stayed in Belgrade with Partizan until 1986 however he made no league appearance and spent most time as reserve goalkeeper. During the winter break of the 1985–86 season, he, along two other Partizan players, Slobodan Krčmarević and Ljubiša Milačić, joined FK Bor, playing in the Yugoslav Second League. But at the end of the season, he left Bor and joined FK Pobeda. Between 1987 and 1989 he spent two seasons playing with another Serbian club, OFK Kikinda. In 1990, he returned to Macedonia and joined FK Skopje playing at that time in the Yugoslav third level. In 1992, he moved to Switzerland and played three seasons with Winterthur until summer 1995. He then returned to Macedonia, which by then had become independent, and played with Sloga Jugoomagnat in the Macedonian First League. In 1998, he joined Anzhi Makhachkala and played the following two seasons in the Russian First Division. In the seasons 2000 and 2001 besides being registered in the squad, he became also the teams goalkeeping coach. He finished his playing career because of a serious clash that provoked him a knee injury.

== International career ==
Lipovski was part of the Macedonia national team on three occasions, in two games for the 1996 EURO qualifiers, and one game for the 1998 World Cup qualifiers, however, in all those three occasions, Lipovski was an unused substitute goalkeeper.

== Administrative career ==
After retiring, Lipovski was for a time president of Macedonian club FK Karaorman from Struga, and was also the sports director of FC Anzhi Makhachkala between 21 February and 2 June 2014.
