= Sergey Mitin (footballer) =

Russian footballer

Personal information
- Full name: Sergey Anatolyevich Mitin
- Date of birth: 3 June 1980 (age 46)
- Height: 1.80 m (5 ft 11 in)
- Position: Midfielder

Senior career*
Years	Team	Apps	(Gls)
1997–1999	FC Lokomotiv Kaluga	85	(8)
1999–2000	FC Krylia Sovetov Samara	10	(0)
2000	FC Krylia Sovetov-2 Samara	8	(1)
2000	FC Arsenal Tula	4	(0)
2001	FC Krylia Sovetov Samara (reserves)		
2001–2002	FC Lokomotiv Kaluga	67	(7)
2003–2004	FC Amkar Perm	36	(3)
2004	FC Ural Yekaterinburg	11	(0)
2005	FC Metallurg-Kuzbass Novokuznetsk	16	(0)
2006	FC Salyut-Energia Belgorod	20	(0)
2007	FC Tekstilshchik-Telekom Ivanovo	26	(2)
2008	FC Volgar-Gazprom-2 Astrakhan	26	(2)
2009	FC Lokomotiv Kaluga (D4)		
2010	FC Kaluga	10	(1)
- * Club domestic league appearances and goals

Sergey Anatolyevich Mitin (Russian: Серге́й Анато́льевич Ми́тин; born 3 June 1980) is a Russian former professional association football player.

== Club career ==
He played in the Russian Premier League for three seasons for FC Krylia Sovetov Samara and FC Amkar Perm.
