= Goran Jovanović (footballer, born 1972) =

Serbian footballer

Personal information
- Full name: Goran Jovanović
- Date of birth: 20 March 1972 (age 54)
- Place of birth: Niš, SR Serbia, SFR Yugoslavia
- Height: 1.76 m (5 ft 9 in)
- Position: Defender

Senior career*
Years	Team	Apps	(Gls)
1993–1994	Jastrebac Niš	32	(1)
1994–1999	Radnički Niš	92	(4)
2000	Železničar Niš		
2001	Anzhi Makhachkala	11	(0)
2002	Car Konstantin		
2002–2003	Győr	26	(0)
2006	Neisti Djúpivogur	9	(1)
Total		170+	(6+)
- * Club domestic league appearances and goals

Goran Jovanović (Serbian Cyrillic: Горан Јовановић; born 20 March 1972) is a Serbian retired footballer who played as a defender.

== Career ==
After starting out at Jastrebac Niš, Jovanović spent five seasons with Radnički Niš in the First League of FR Yugoslavia. He later played abroad in Russia (Anzhi Makhachkala), Hungary (Győr), and Iceland (Neisti D.). In 2002, Jovanović had a short stint with Car Konstantin, helping them win promotion to the Second League of FR Yugoslavia. He also played for amateur club Mladost Lalinac before hanging up his boots.

== Honours ==
Anzhi Makhachkala

- Russian Cup: Runner-up 2000–01
