= Magomed Magomedov (footballer, born 1987) =

Russian footballer

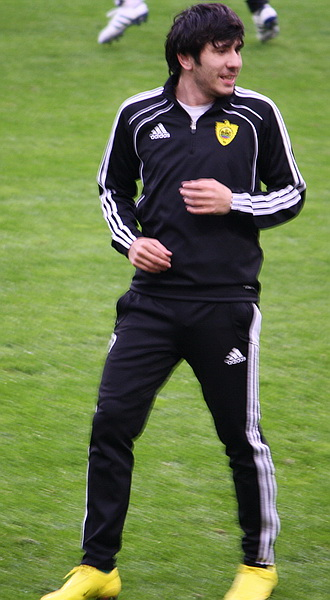

Personal information
- Full name: Magomed Magomed-Sultanovich Magomedov
- Date of birth: 11 December 1987 (age 38)
- Height: 1.78 m (5 ft 10 in)
- Position: Forward

Senior career*
Years	Team	Apps	(Gls)
2003	FC Anzhi Makhachkala	7	(2)
2004–2005	FC Krylia Sovetov Samara	0	(0)
2005–2010	FC Anzhi Makhachkala	87	(12)
- * Club domestic league appearances and goals

Magomed Magomed-Sultanovich Magomedov (Russian: Магомед Магомед-Султанович Магомедов; born 11 December 1987) is a former Russian professional footballer.

== Club career ==
He made his professional debut in the Russian First Division in 2003 for FC Anzhi Makhachkala.
