= Valery Alekseyev (footballer) =

Russian footballer

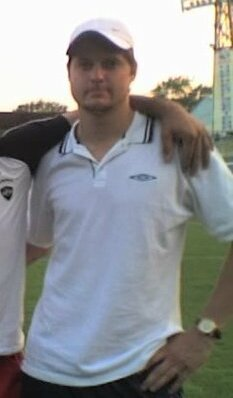

Personal information
- Full name: Valery Valentinovich Alekseyev
- Date of birth: 16 February 1979
- Place of birth: Pskov, Russian SFSR
- Date of death: 27 January 2024 (aged 44)
- Place of death: Belgorod, Russia
- Height: 1.85 m (6 ft 1 in)
- Positions: Forward; midfielder

Senior career*
Years	Team	Apps	(Gls)
1997	Mashinostroitel Pskov	29	(3)
1998	Pskov	5	(0)
1998	Energiya Velikiye Luki	6	(2)
1999	Pskov	21	(9)
2000	Spartak Kostroma	6	(1)
2000–2002	Anzhi Makhachkala	19	(1)
2002	Fakel Voronezh	12	(6)
2003	Anzhi Makhachkala	21	(2)
2004	Dinamo Minsk	1	(0)
2004–2006	Oryol	79	(11)
2007	Salyut-Energia Belgorod	21	(2)
2009	Stavropolye-2009	5	(0)
2010	Pskov-747 Pskov	14	(2)
Total		239	(39)
- * Club domestic league appearances and goals

Valery Valentinovich Alekseyev (Russian: Валерий Валентинович Алексеев; 16 February 1979 – 27 January 2024) was a Russian professional footballer.

== Honours ==
- Belarusian Premier League champion: 2004

== Betting scandal ==
He was one of the players and coaches named by Professional Football League on 1 September 2010 as making bets on their own team's results.
