= Valeri Likhobabenko =

Russian footballer

Personal information
- Full name: Valeri Valeryevich Likhobabenko
- Date of birth: 17 February 1976 (age 50)
- Place of birth: Lyubertsy, Russian SFSR
- Height: 1.90 m (6 ft 3 in)
- Positions: Defender; midfielder

Senior career*
Years	Team	Apps	(Gls)
1994–1996	FC Torgmash Lyubertsy	95	(16)
1997	FC Dynamo-d Moscow	39	(3)
1998	FC Dynamo-2 Moscow	38	(5)
1999–2001	FC Anzhi Makhachkala	85	(7)
2003	FC Anzhi Makhachkala	22	(0)
2004	FC Vostok	16	(1)
2004–2006	FC Kairat	50	(2)
2007	FC Alma-Ata	8	(0)
2008–2009	FC Fortuna Mytishchi (amateur)		
2010	FC Oka Stupino (amateur)		
2010	FC Olimp-SKOPA Zheleznodorozhny		
2011–2014	FC Prialit Reutov		
2014	FC Kvazar Moscow		
2017–2018	FC Veles Moscow	26	(0)
2019	FC Kolomna	8	(0)
- * Club domestic league appearances and goals

Valeri Valeryevich Likhobabenko (Russian: Валерий Валерьевич Лихобабенко; born 17 February 1976) is a Russian former professional footballer.

== Club career ==
He made his professional debut in the Russian Third League in 1994 for FC Torgmash Lyubertsy. He played in one game in the UEFA Intertoto Cup 1997 for FC Dynamo Moscow.

== Honours ==
- Russian Cup finalist: 2001.
- Kazakhstan Premier League champion: 2004.
