= Aleksandr Zhidkov (footballer, born 1966) =

Russian footballer

Personal information
- Full name: Aleksandr Valentinovich Zhidkov
- Date of birth: 9 April 1966 (age 60)
- Height: 1.79 m (5 ft 10 in)
- Position: Midfielder

Senior career*
| Years | Team | Apps | (Gls) |
| 1983–1984 | FC Spartak Oryol | 35 | (6) |
| 1987 | FC Aktyubinets | 28 | (0) |
| 1988–1989 | FC Kairat | 58 | (7) |
| 1990 | FC Dnipro Dnipropetrovsk | 13 | (0) |
| 1991–1993 | FC Rotor Volgograd | 62 | (6) |
| 1994–1995 | FC Krylia Sovetov Samara | 36 | (3) |
| 1996–1997 | FC Metallurg Lipetsk | 71 | (19) |
| 1998–1999 | FC Saturn Ramenskoye | 67 | (6) |
| 2000–2004 | FC Sokol Saratov | 108 | (9) |
- * Club domestic league appearances and goals

Aleksandr Valentinovich Zhidkov (Russian: Александр Валентинович Жидков; born 9 April 1966) is a former Russian professional footballer.

== Club career ==
Zhidkov made his professional debut in the Soviet Second League in 1983 for FC Spartak Oryol.

== Honours ==
- USSR Federation Cup winner: 1988
- USSR Federation Cup finalist: 1990
- Russian Premier League runner-up: 1993
