= Aleksandr Zhidkov (footballer, born 1965) =

Azerbaijani footballer (born 1965)

Aleksandr Zhidkov Александр Жидков
Personal information
- Full name: Aleksandr Vitalyevich Zhidkov
- Date of birth: 16 March 1965 (age 61)
- Place of birth: Prikumsk, Stavropol Krai, Soviet Union
- Height: 1.94 m (6 ft 4 in)
- Position: Goalkeeper

Youth career
- ROShISP-10 Rostov-on-Don

Senior career*
Years	Team	Apps	(Gls)
1981–1983	Atommash Volgodonsk	23	(0)
1984–1988	Neftchi Baku	78	(0)
1988–1992	Dynamo Kyiv	22	(0)
1992	Nyva Vinnytsia	6	(0)
1993	Admira Wacker	11	(0)
1993–1998	Hapoel Tzafririm Holon	151	(0)
1999–2001	FC Anzhi Makhachkala	73	(0)
2002–2003	FC Tom Tomsk	36	(0)

International career
1994–1998	Azerbaijan	21	(0)

Managerial career
- 2001: FC Anzhi Makhachkala (GK coach)
- 2004: FC Moscow (assistant)
- 2005: FC Oryol (GK coach)
- 2006: FC Tom Tomsk (assistant)
- 2008: FC Tom Tomsk (GK coach)
- 2009: FC Volga Tver (GK coach)
- 2009: FC Nosta Novotroitsk (GK coach)
- 2010: FC Rostov (GK coach)
- 2011: FC Anzhi Makhachkala (GK coach)
- 2012–2013: FC Dynamo Moscow (academy)
- 2014: FC Khimik Dzerzhinsk (GK coach)
- 2014–2015: FC Tambov (GK coach)
- 2016–2018: FC Khimki (youth GK coach)
- 2018–2019: FC Anzhi Makhachkala (GK coach)
- 2019–2020: FC Avangard Kursk (GK coach)
- * Club domestic league appearances and goals

Aleksandr Vitalyevich Zhidkov (Russian: Александр Витальевич Жидков; born 16 March 1965) is an Azerbaijani football coach and a former goalkeeper. He was also a member of Azerbaijan national football team.

== Career ==
Zhidkov made 21 appearances for the Azerbaijan national football team from 1994 to 1998.

== Honours ==
Individual

- Toulon Tournament Best Goalkeeper: 1984
