= Andrey Sherakow =

Belarusian footballer

Personal information
- Date of birth: 10 November 1982 (age 44)
- Place of birth: Brest, Belarusian SSR
- Height: 1.85 m (6 ft 1 in)
- Position: Forward

Youth career
- Zvezda-VA-BGU Minsk

Senior career*
Years	Team	Apps	(Gls)
2000–2002	Darida Minsk Raion	29	(4)
2003	Zvezda-BGU Minsk	14	(0)
2004–2005	Dinamo Brest	33	(4)
2006	Mikashevichi	23	(15)
2007–2008	Torpedo Zhodino	64	(29)
2009	Simurq	7	(0)
2010–2011	Minsk	53	(10)
2012	Gomel	20	(6)
2013	Slavia Mozyr	15	(1)
2013–2016	Granit Mikashevichi	76	(22)
2016	Luch Minsk	10	(2)
2017	Belshina Bobruisk	26	(6)
2018	Uzda	5	(0)
Total		375	(99)
- * Club domestic league appearances and goals as of 31 December 2018

Andrey Sherakow (Belarusian: Андрэй Шэракоў; Russian: Андрей Шеряков; born 10 November 1982) is a Belarusian former professional footballer.

== Honours ==
Gomel

- Belarusian Super Cup winner: 2012
