= FC Savit Mogilev =

Savit Mogilev
- Full name: FC Savit Mogilev
- Founded: 2005
- Dissolved: 2009
- Ground: Torpedo Stadium, Mogilev, Belarus
- League: Belarusian Premier League
- 2008: 15th
Home colours	Away colours

FC Savit Mogilev was a Belarusian football club based in Mogilev. In the 2007 season they have been promoted to the Premier League. It was disbanded after the 2008 season.

== History ==
The team was formed in 2005 and is sometimes erroneously seen as a successor to Torpedo-Kadino Mogilev, a First League team from the same city that was disbanded in late 2005. This is, however, not the case, as the team had different owner, office, club logo, name and colours, almost entirely new squad, and was a different entity legally.

Savit finished 2nd in their first season in the Second League (2006) and was promoted to the First League. In 2007, the team won the First League and made its debut in the Premier League in 2008. After a disappointing 15th place, Savit finished in relegation zone and eventually was folded before the start of the next season.

== League and Cup history ==
Season	Level	Pos	Pld	W	D	L	Goals	Points	Domestic Cup	Notes
2006	3rd	2	32	26	3	3	114–19	81		Promoted
2007	2nd	1	26	16	5	5	50–21	53	Round of 32	Promoted
2008	1st	15	30	5	6	19	28–61	21	Round of 32	Relegated, disbanded
2009									Round of 32	
