= FC Spartak-Chukotka Moscow =

- Full name: Football Club Spartak-Chukotka Moscow
- Founded: 1998
- Dissolved: 2000
- 2000: Russian First Division, 19th
Home colours	Away colours

FC Spartak-Chukotka Moscow (Russian: ФК «Спартак‑Чукотка» Москва) was a Russian football team from Moscow. It played professionally in 1999 and 2000 (in 2000 it was playing on the second-highest level in the Russian First Division).
