= Ishref Magomedov =

Russian footballer

Personal information
- Full name: Ishref Sokratovich Magomedov
- Date of birth: 6 October 1980 (age 46)
- Place of birth: Derbent, Dagestan ASSR, Soviet Union
- Height: 1.83 m (6 ft 0 in)
- Position: Forward

Youth career
- 1999–2000: CSKA Moscow

Senior career*
Years	Team	Apps	(Gls)
2001	Anzhi Makhachkala	0	(0)
2002	Torpedo Vladimir	17	(1)
2003–2004	Anzhi Makhachkala	9	(0)
2005	Nistru Otaci	10	(1)
2006	Torpedo Zhodino	9	(3)
2006–2007	Shakhtyor Soligorsk	12	(1)
2007–2008	Sokol Saratov	27	(8)
2008	Gazovik Orenburg	5	(0)
2009	Sokol Saratov	20	(3)
- * Club domestic league appearances and goals

Ishref Sokratovich Magomedov (Russian: Ишреф Сократович Магомедов; born 6 October 1980) is a former Russian footballer.

== Club career ==
He made his Russian Football National League debut for FC Anzhi Makhachkala on 16 April 2003 in a game against FC Baltika Kaliningrad. He played for one more season in the FNL for Anzhi.
