= Carlos Roberto (footballer, born 1980) =

Brazilian footballer

Personal information
- Full name: Carlos Roberto de Lima
- Date of birth: 28 January 1980 (age 46)
- Place of birth: Londrina, Brazil
- Height: 1.87 m (6 ft 1 1/2 in)
- Position: Forward

Senior career*
Years	Team	Apps	(Gls)
2002	Londrina		
2003	FC Rostov	1	(0)
2004–2006	Londrina		
- * Club domestic league appearances and goals

Carlos Roberto de Lima or simply Carlos Roberto (born 28 January 1980 in Londrina) is a former Brazilian football player.

He played his only game in the Russian Football Premier League for FC Rostov on 27 September 2003 against PFC CSKA Moscow.
