= Marcos (footballer, born 1970) =

Brazilian footballer

Personal information
- Full name: José Maria Marcos
- Date of birth: 12 June 1970 (age 56)
- Place of birth: São Paulo, Brazil
- Height: 1.84 m (6 ft 1/2 in)
- Position: Midfielder

Senior career*
Years	Team	Apps	(Gls)
1997	FC KAMAZ-Chally Naberezhnye Chelny	1	(0)
1997	→ FC KAMAZ-d Naberezhnye Chelny (loan)	6	(0)
2001	Ceará		
- * Club domestic league appearances and goals

José Maria Marcos or simply Marcos (born 12 June 1970 in São Paulo) is a former Brazilian football player.
